= Sungkyunkwan University =

Private university in South Korea

- 成均館大學校 성균관대학교
- Motto: 인의예지 (仁義禮智)
- Motto in English: Humanity, Righteousness, Propriety, Wisdom
- Type: Private research university
- Established: 1398; 628 years ago. Given college status in 1946.
- President: Yoo Ji-Beom (유지범)
- Faculty: 4,023 (1,529 full-time)
- Students: 34,837
- Undergraduates: 25,194
- Postgraduates: 9,643
- Location: Seoul (Humanities and Social Sciences Campus), Suwon (Natural Sciences Campus), South Korea; 37°35′14″N 126°59′39″E
- Campus: Urban
- Colors: Blue; Lime Green; Orange; Dark Green
- Mascot: Ginkgo
- Website: www.skku.edu

Korean name
- Hangul: 성균관대학교
- Hanja: 成均館大學校
- RR: Seonggyungwan daehakgyo
- MR: Sŏnggyun'gwan taehakkyo

Sungkyunkwan University (SKKU or Seongdae, Korean: 성균관대학교; Hanja: 成均館大學校) is a private research university with campuses in Seoul and Suwon, South Korea. The institution traces its origins to the historic Sungkyunkwan founded in 1398 in central Seoul. As the foremost educational institution during the Joseon period, it was governed by the great code of the state administration with royal assent. By a resolution of the Progressive Intellectuals and Confucian scholars, it was restructured as a comprehensive university in the mid-20th century, and has since greatly expanded its academic offerings.

== History ==
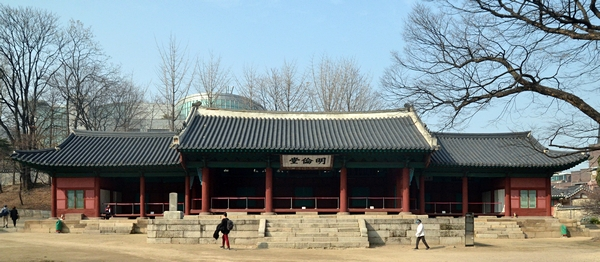
Myeongnyundang (明倫堂)

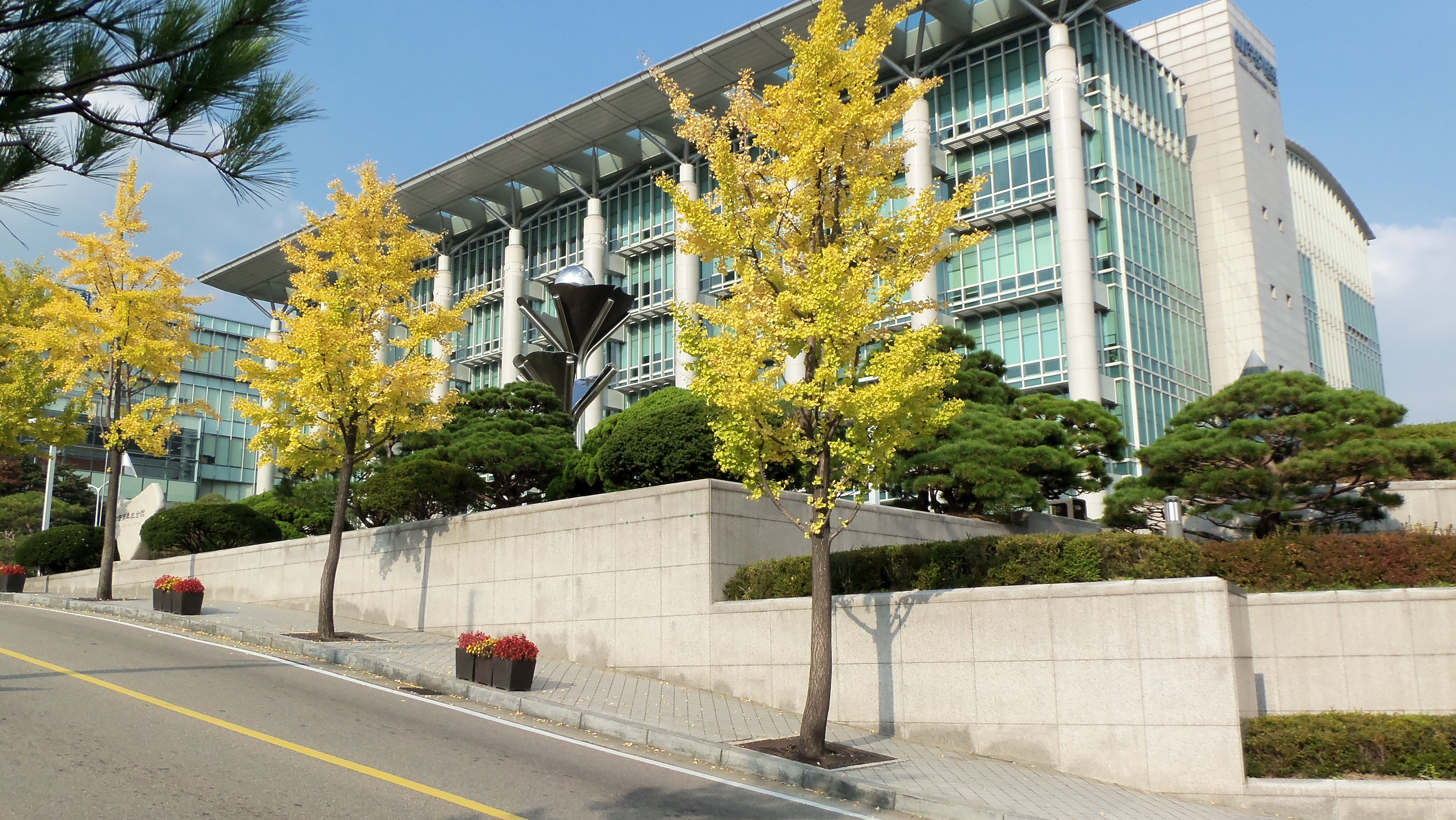
600th Anniversary Building

Sungkyunkwan was established in 1398 and became the most prestigious educational institution in Joseon. Its name means "to make" (성; 成; seong), "harmonious society" (균; 均; gyun), "institute" (관; 館; gwan).

The school focused on in-depth study of the Chinese classics, Confucian canon, and contemporary literature; and on how to apply knowledge to governing the nation and to understanding the nature of humanity. It also served as a shrine (see Munmyo) to Confucian sages, and rituals were held regularly to honor them and their teachings.

The school was located within the city walls of Hanseong (modern-day Seoul), Korea's capital during the Joseon Dynasty. It followed the example of the Goryeo-period Gukjagam, which in its latter years was also known by the name "Sungkyunkwan".

Numerous Korean historical figures, including Yi Hwang and Yi I, studied at and graduated from Sungkyunkwan. A considerable amount of Korean literature and works of Hanja calligraphy were created and archived by Sungkyunkwan scholars over the centuries.

The history of Sungkyunkwan University can be divided into the ancient university, modern university, and contemporary university eras.

=== Ancient University Era (1398–1894) ===
During the ancient university era, traditional Confucian education was practiced.

From the establishment of Sungkyunkwan during the reign of King Taejo to the time of King Seongjong, buildings were constructed, systems were established, operating policies were effected, and the school was cemented as the top national educational center.

A long period of recession followed, from 1495 to 1724, that is, from the time of Yeonsangun to that of Gyeongjong. The beginning of this period was marked by a brief closure due to the tyranny of Yeonsangun, when, in 1505, Sungkyunkwan was reduced to a place to hold feasts. Though it was restored to its original status the next year under King Jungjong, during the Japanese invasions of Korea (1592–1598), Sungkyunkwan was burnt down and rebuilt.

A period of revival followed, from 1725 to 1894, that is, from the reign of King Yeongjo to the time of Gabo Reform. Education at Sungkyunkwan became lively amid political and academic revival, and reformation of the education system was actively developed by Silhak scholars.

=== Modern University Era (1895–1945) ===
A period of enlightenment followed, that is, from Sungkyunkwan's founding as a modern university (1895) to the Japanese annexation of Korea (1910). In 1895, a three-year department of Chinese classics (경학과; 經學科; gyeonghakkwa) was established, and various courses such as history, geography, and mathematics were taught. At the same time, a professor appointment system, admission examination system, and graduation examination system were implemented; a semester system was introduced; and modern institutional reforms such as setting the number of teaching days per year and the number of lecture hours per week were effected. Under Japanese occupation (1910–1945), however, Sungkyunkwan lost its position as the highest school in Joseon.

=== Contemporary University Era (1945–Present) ===
On 15 August 1945, the Japanese Empire was defeated. In November of the same year, Kim Chang-sook led a foundation that revived Sungkyunkwan as an educational center. Sungkyunkwan University was thus re-established by collecting some of the property of the hyanggyo and donations from Confucian scholars.

== Partnership with Samsung ==
Samsung partnered with SKKU from 1965 to 1977, and renewed this partnership in 1996. The university claims that this has helped it to pursue globalization and to foster talented graduates. The partnership has boosted research infrastructure and human resource management, and it has helped the university to develop courses in software development, mobile communications engineering, energy engineering, nanotechnology, business, medicine, and law.

Through the Samsung Global Scholarship Program, 15–25 students are selected annually for Seoul National University's engineering program or to enroll at SKKU's Graduate School of Business (SKK GSB), which partners with top business schools abroad, including the MIT Sloan School of Management, Columbia University, Northwestern University's Kellogg School of Management, University of Michigan's Ross School of Business, Dartmouth College's Tuck School of Business, Indiana University's Kelley School of Business, and the Singapore Management University.

== Rankings and reputation ==
University rankings
JoongAng National	Domestic	3
QS National	General	5
THE National	General	4
ARWU National	Research	2–3
QS Asia (Asia version)	General	16
THE Asia (Asia version)	General	=19
USNWR Asia	General	=58
ARWU World	Research	151–200
QS World	General	108
THE World	General	87
USNWR World	General	244

According to the ranking of South Korean universities annually published by the national daily newspaper JoongAng Daily, Sungkyunkwan University is ranked third in South Korea after Seoul National University and Yonsei University. For several years, U.S. News & World Report ranked Sungkyunkwan University second in the country.

In the Quacquarelli Symonds (QS) world university rankings (2023), SKKU is ranked 99th globally, and 36th in Asia. In the Times Higher Education 2023 world university rankings, SKKU is ranked 170th internationally.

In the Financial Times rankings, SKK GSB's MBA ranks 82nd worldwide, 15th in Asia, and first in Korea.

== Campuses and transport ==
=== Humanities and Social Sciences Campus (Seoul) ===
The university's Humanities and Social Sciences Campus, also housing arts departments, is in central Seoul on the same hill as Changdeokgung and Changgyeonggung (two of the royal palaces of Joseon). The 1,394,154 m^{2} campus lies in Myeongnyun-dong, near Daehangno. The nearest subway station is Hyehwa on Line 4, and the university operates shuttle buses between the station and the campus.

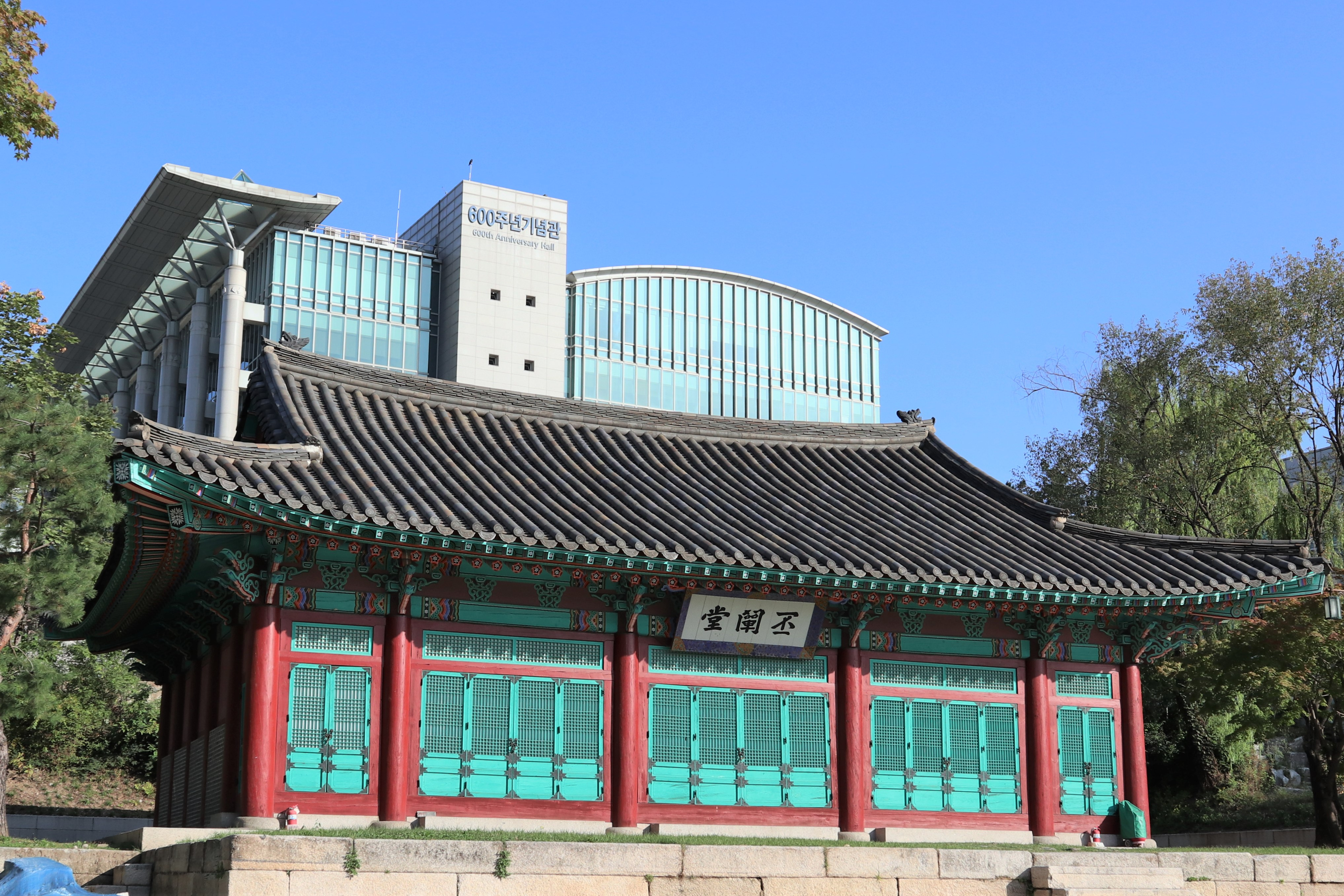
Bicheondang and 600th Anniversary Hall

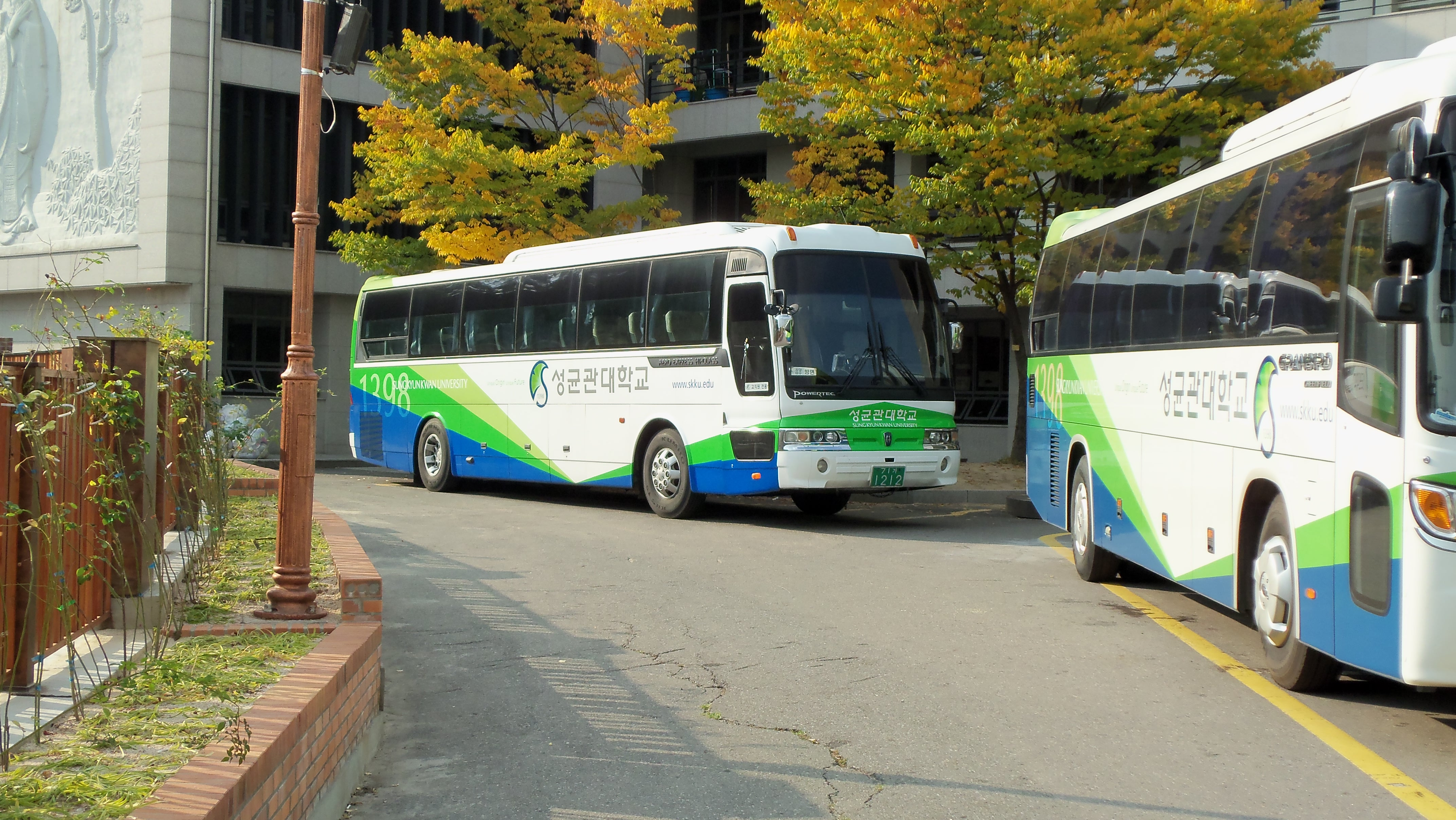
Shuttle buses outside the Student Center

=== Natural Sciences Campus (Suwon) ===
The Natural Sciences Campus, housing natural science, engineering, medicine, and sports departments, is within walking distance of Sungkyunkwan University Station in Yuljeon-dong, northwest Suwon. The 101-hectare campus, 45 km south of Seoul, was established in 1978. At 2,199,187 m^{2}, it is more spacious than the campus in Seoul, so sports facilities and a botanical garden are located on this campus.

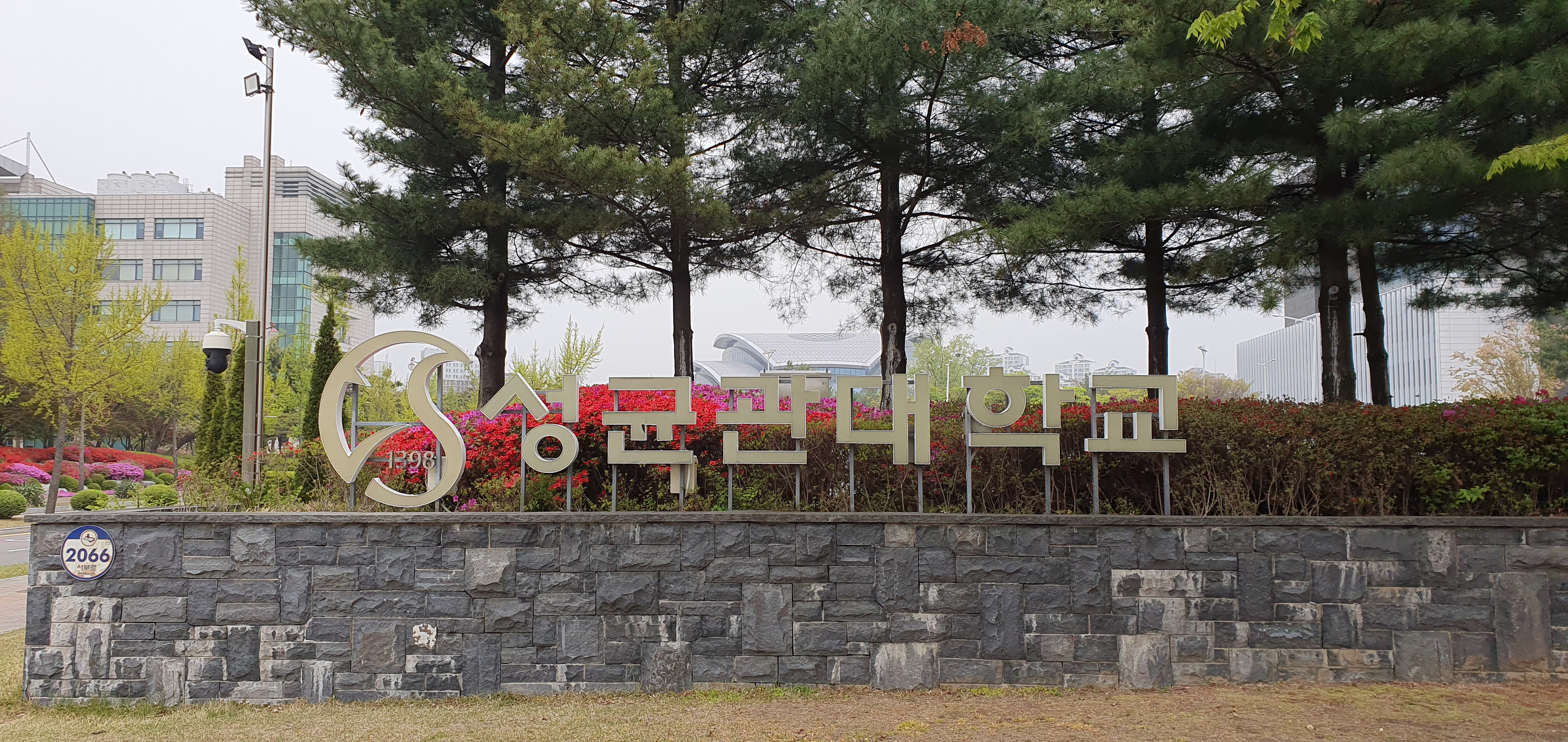
Natural Sciences Campus entrance

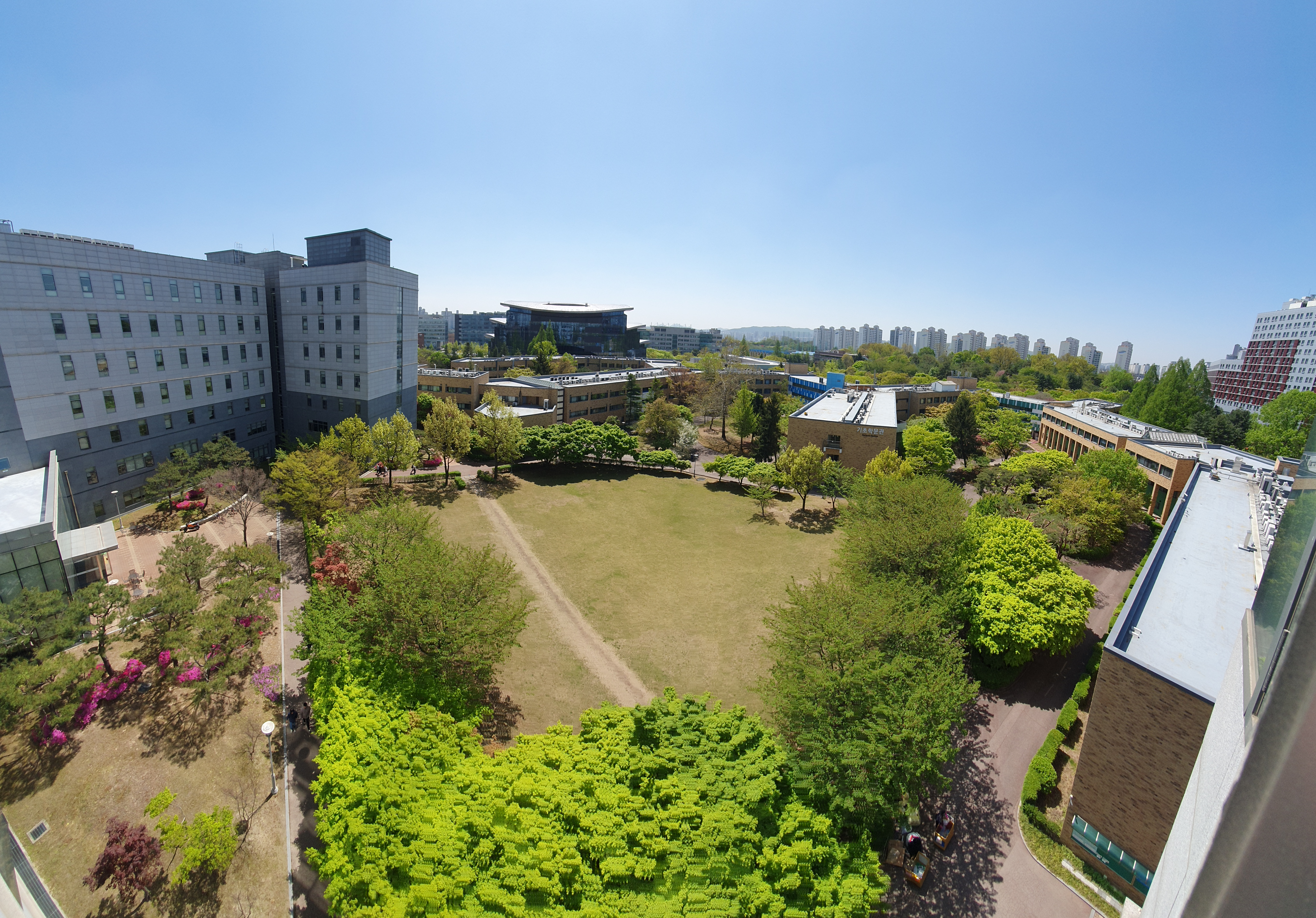
Natural Sciences Campus seen from the Industry Cooperation Centre

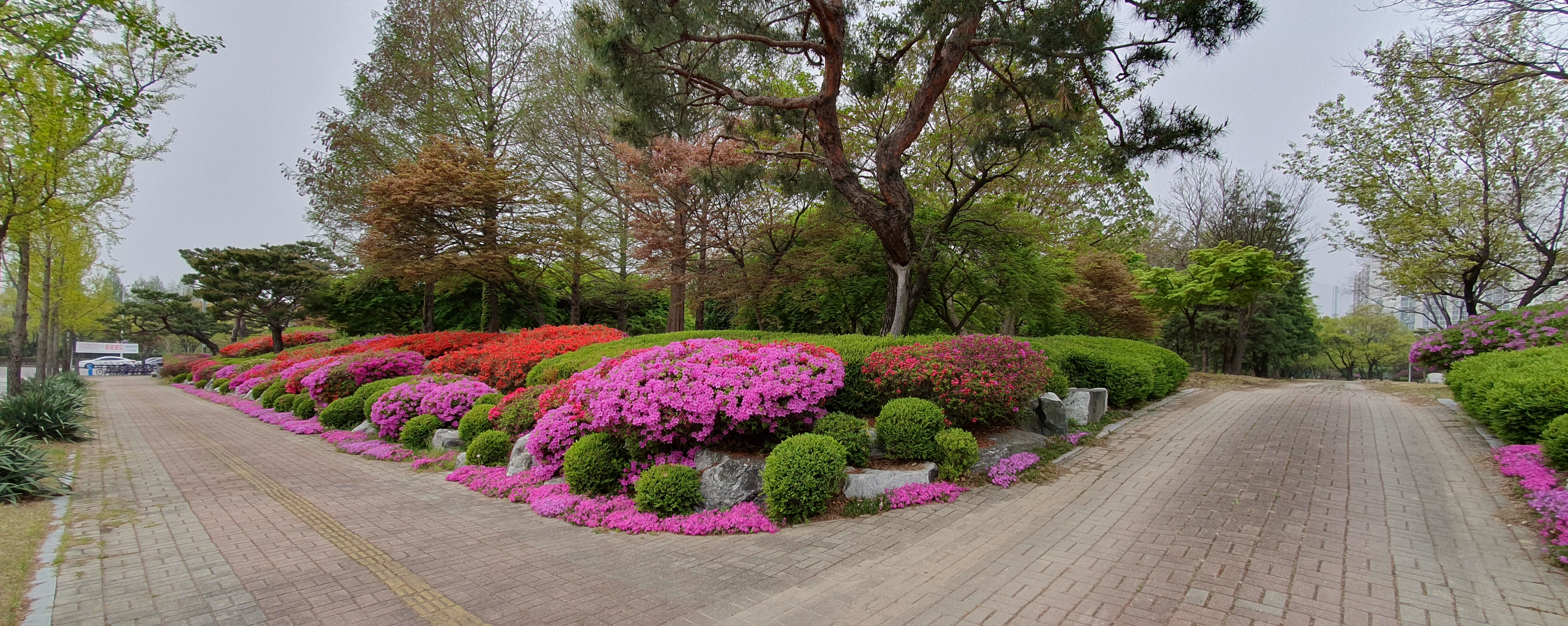
Royal azalea by the garden

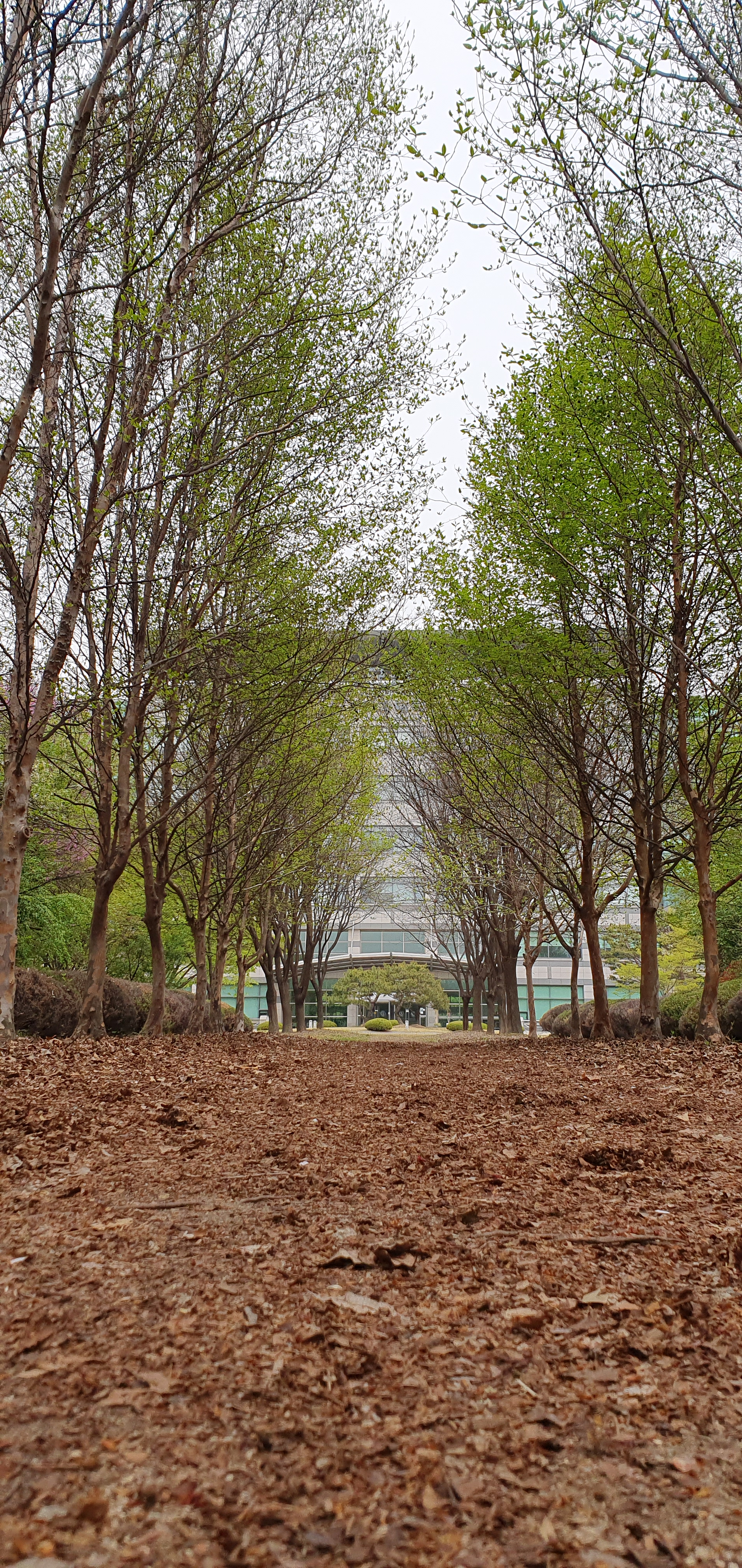
Avenue of trees in the garden

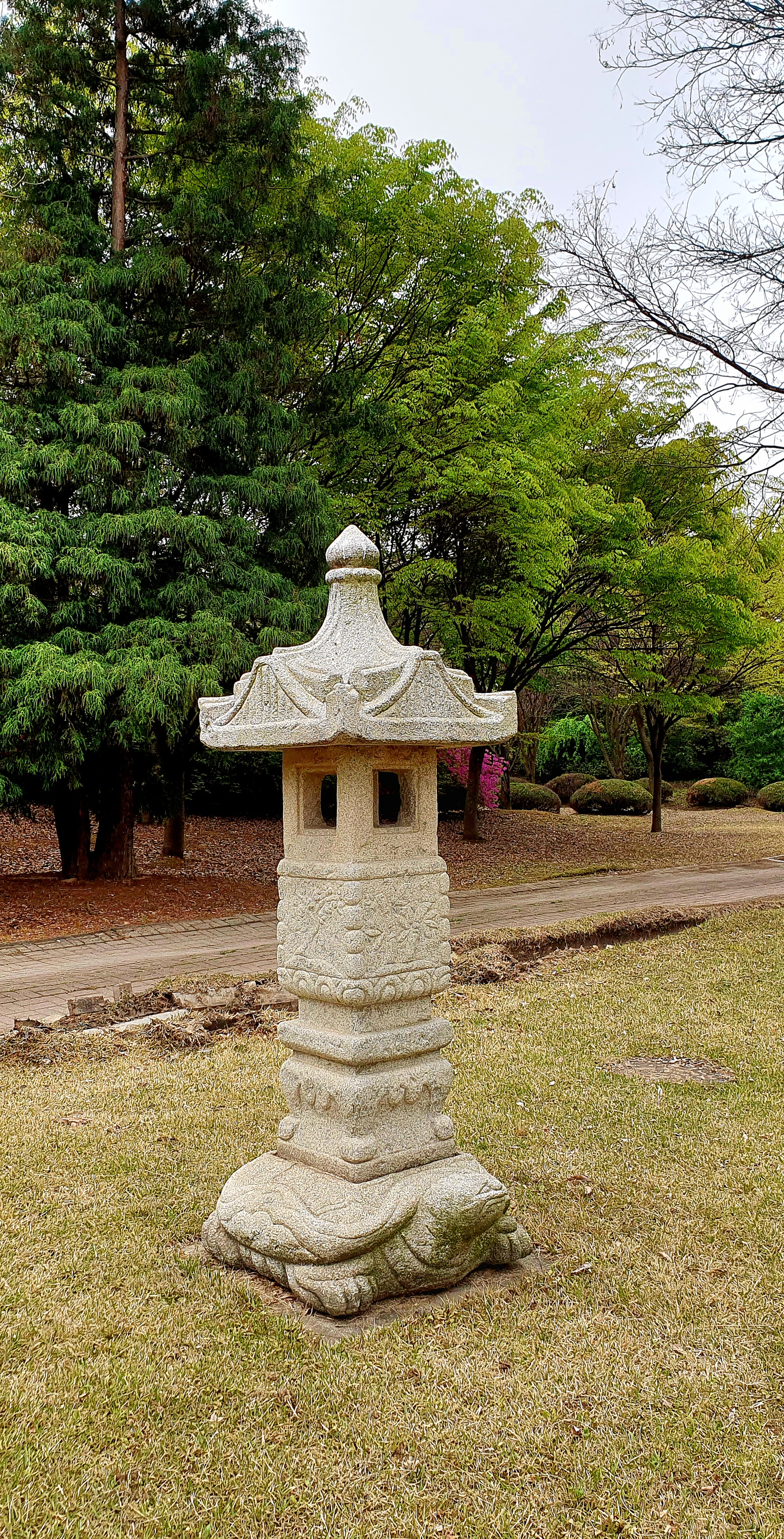
Stone lantern in the garden

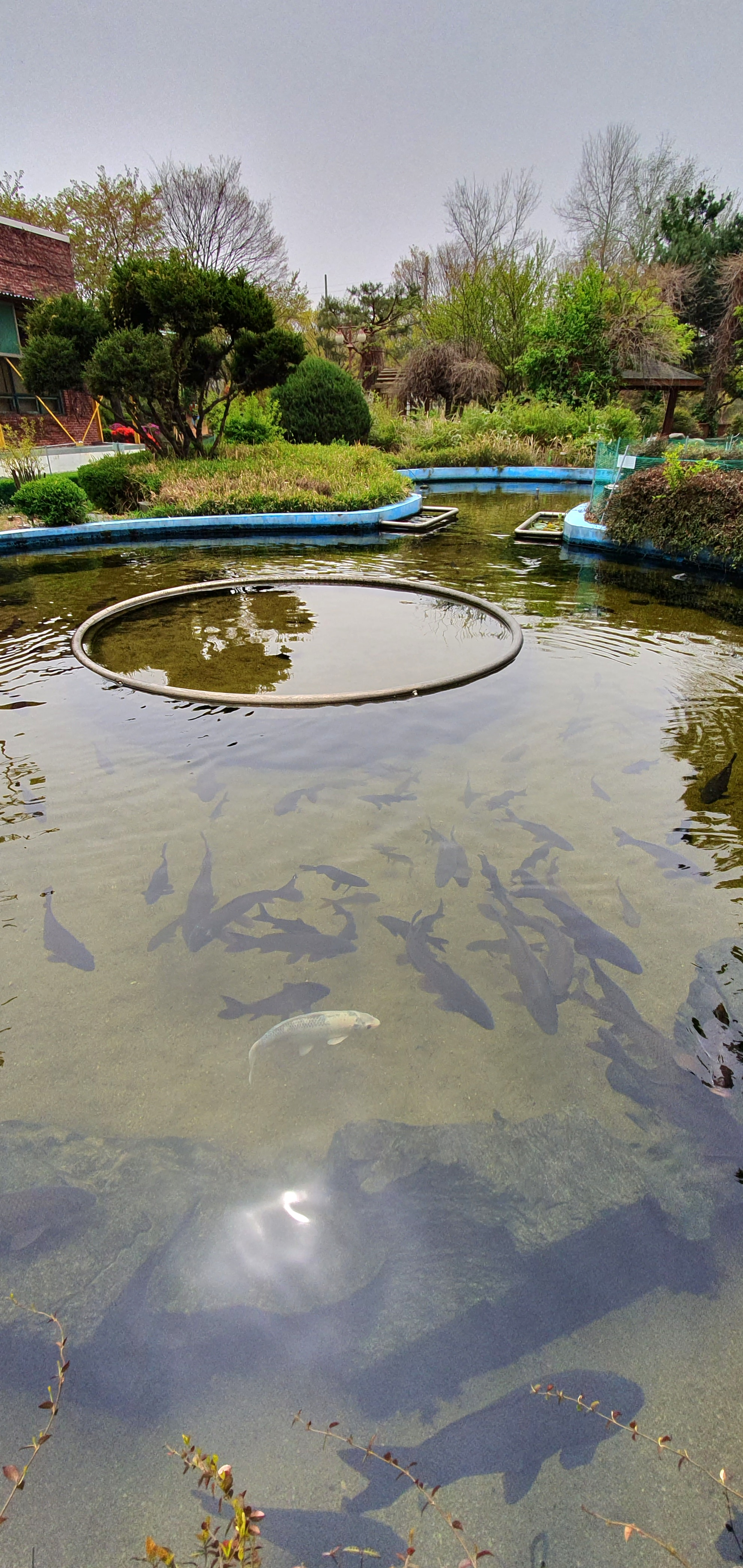
Pond in outflow towards Ilwol Reservoir

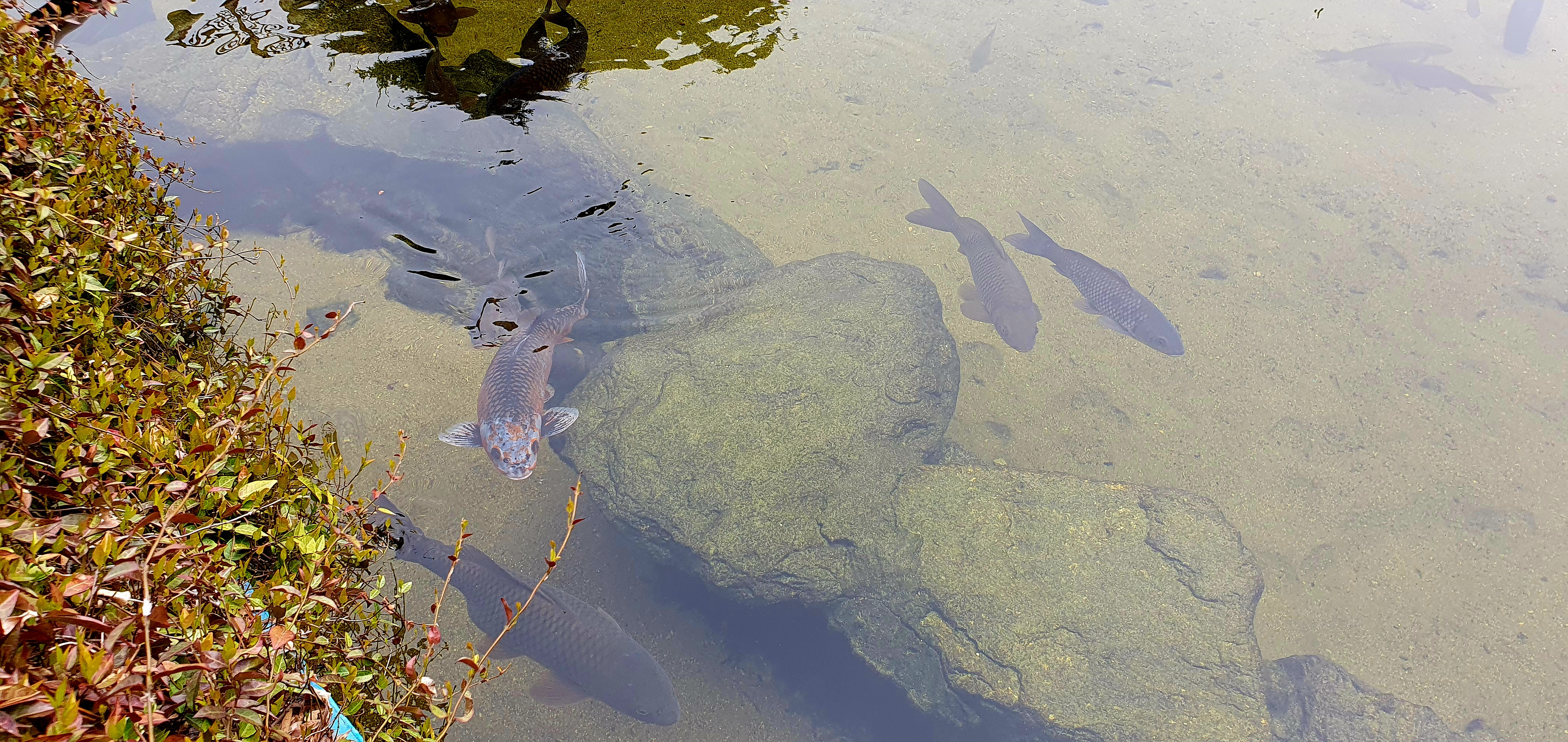
Fish in the pond

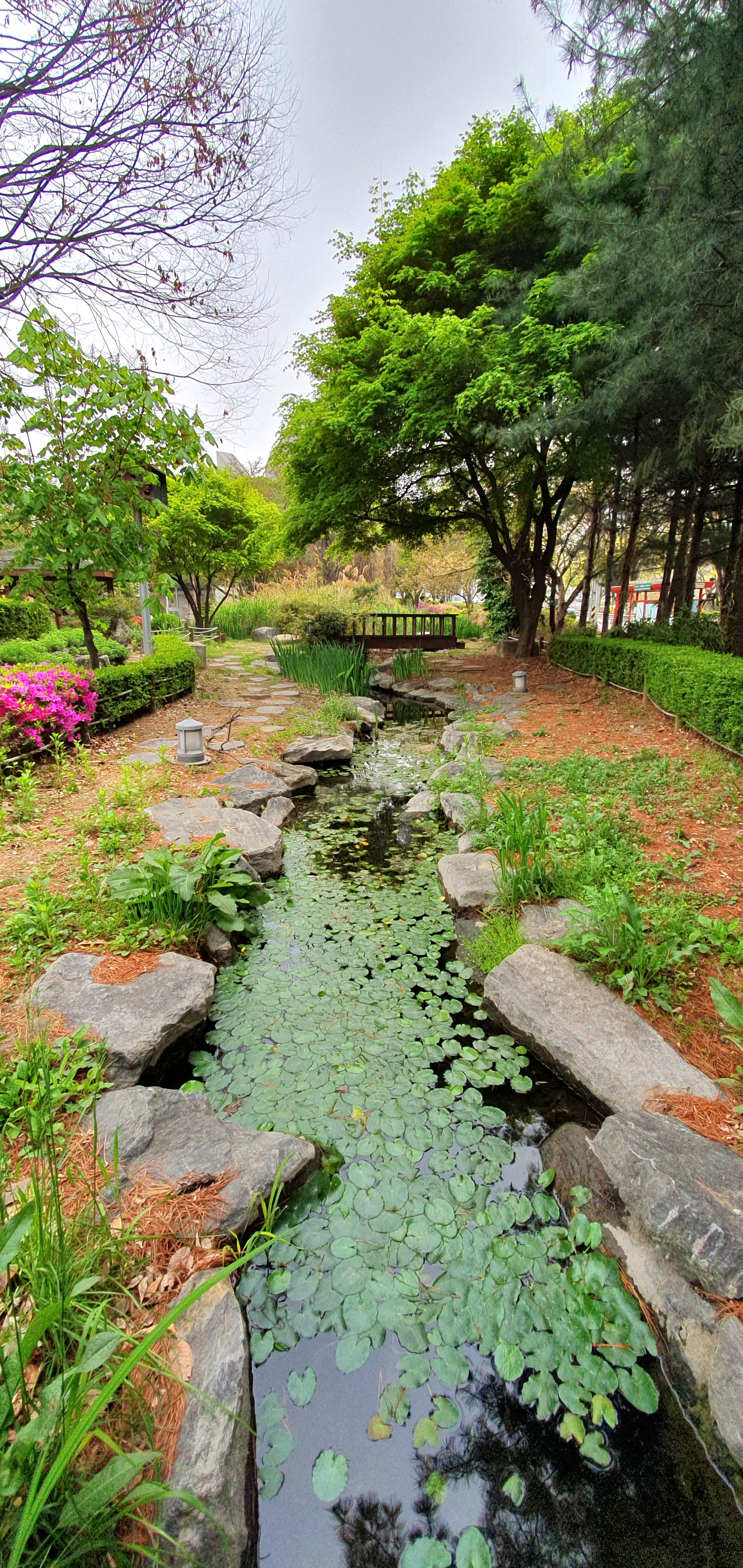
Stream in outflow towards Ilwol Reservoir

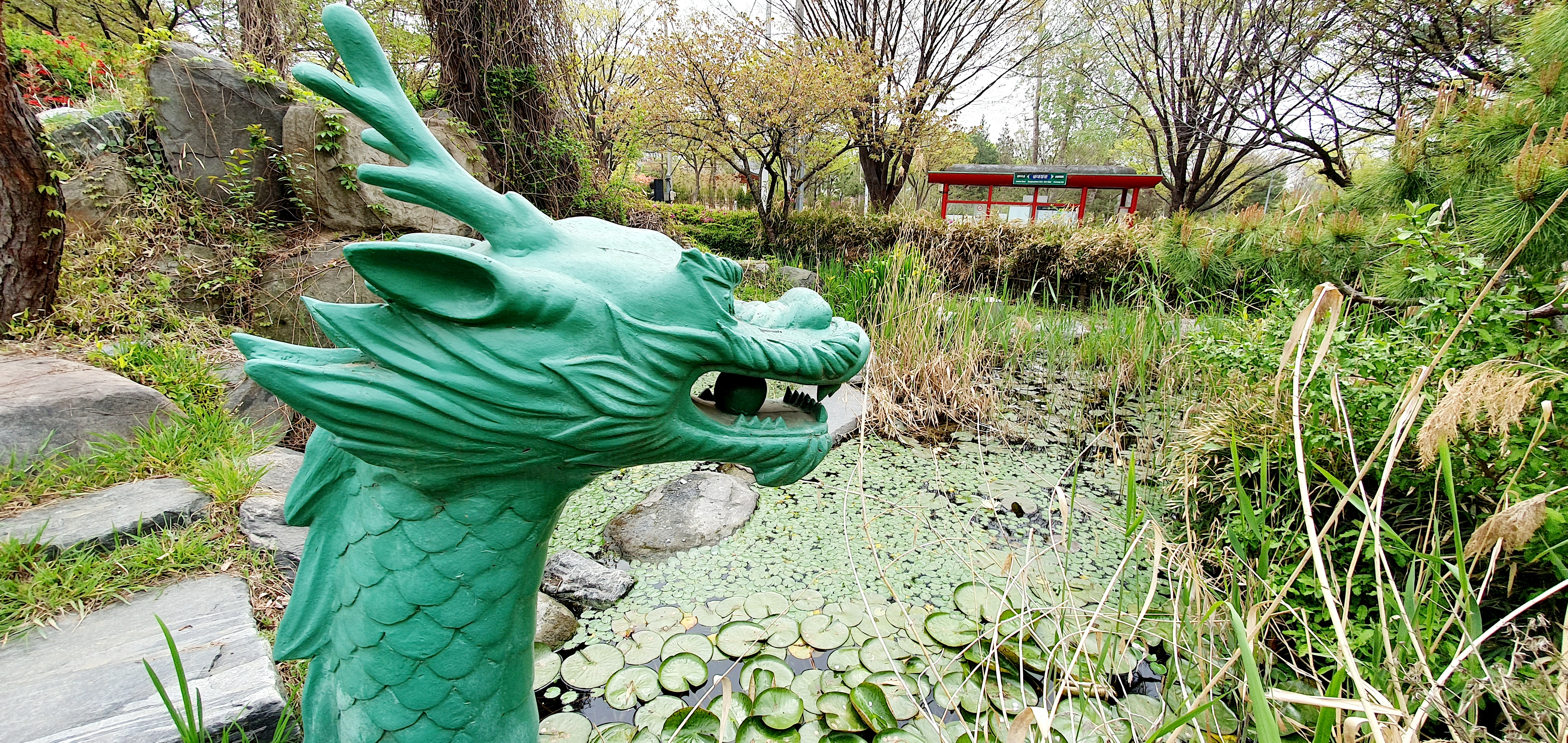
Metal dragon in stream

== Symbols ==
SKKU's motto is "Humanity, Righteousness, Propriety, and Wisdom" (인의예지; 仁義禮智), and reflects the basic spirit of Neo-Confucianism.

The university's symbol—the ginkgo leaf—is derived from the giant ginkgo trees (Natural Monument No. 59) at Myeongnyundang. Both trees are male, and thus do not bear fruit. They are believed to have been planted circa 1519 by Yun Tak, a former chief scholar of Sungkyunkwan.

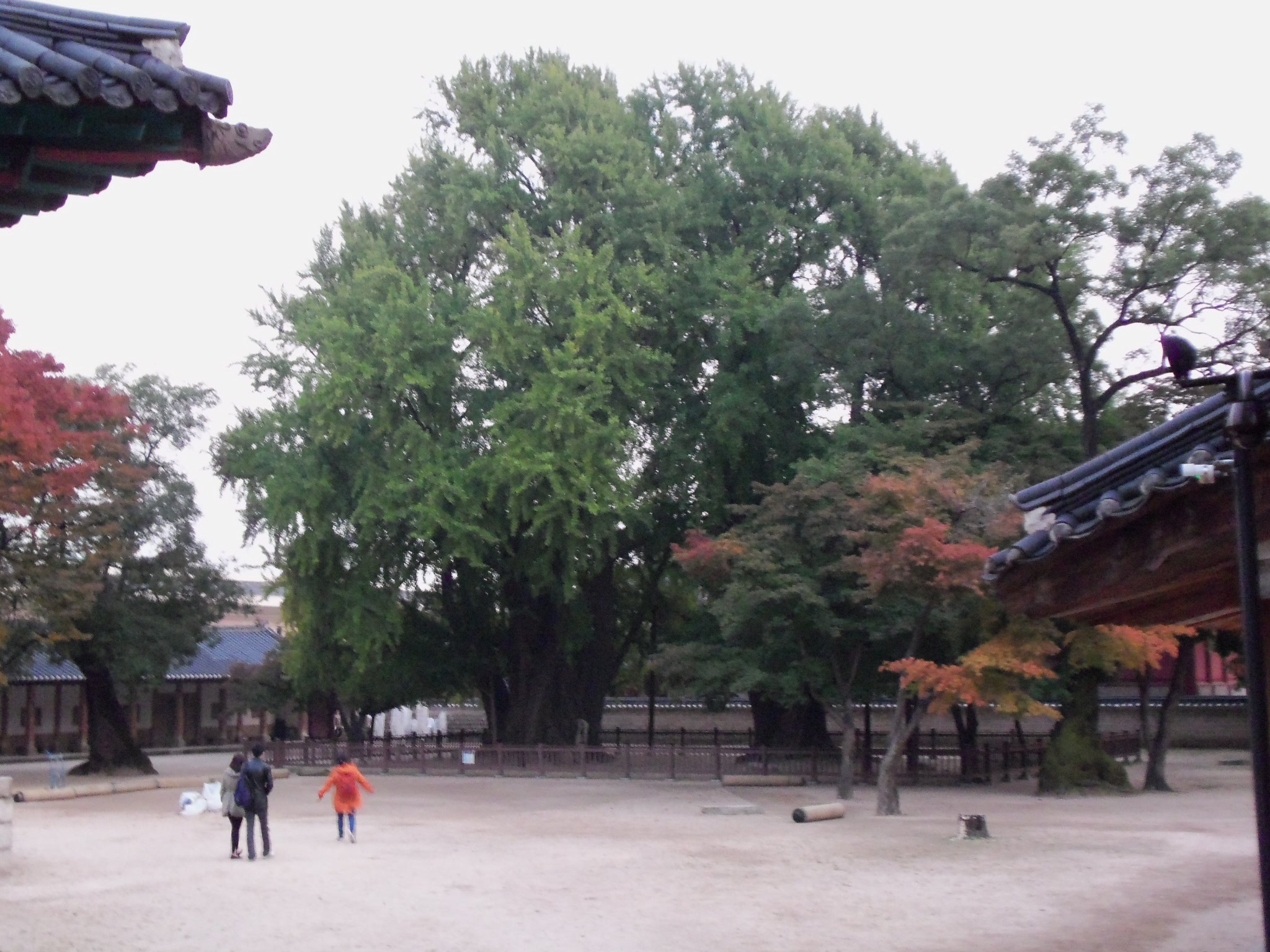
An old ginkgo tree at Sungkyunkwan

== Student housing and dormitories ==
The university has several on-campus dormitories. The Humanities and Social Sciences campus in Seoul has ten dormitories and housing facilities, namely C-house, E-house, G-house, I-house, K-house, M-house, Crownville A, Crownville C, LWG House, and Victory House, while the Natural Sciences Campus in Suwon has five dormitories, namely In-Kwan, Ui-Kwan, Ye-Kwan, Shin-Kwan and Ji-Kwan.

== Research ==
The university spends heavily on research and development, mostly sponsored by Samsung, Hyundai, and government agencies. Notable researchers include Clarivate Citation Laureate Park Nam-Gyu (2017), and physics professor Lee Young-hee, director of the Center for Integrated Nanostructure Physics in the Institute for Basic Science. Both scientists frequently publish in Nature.

=== Sungkyunkwan Advanced Institute of Nanotechnology ===
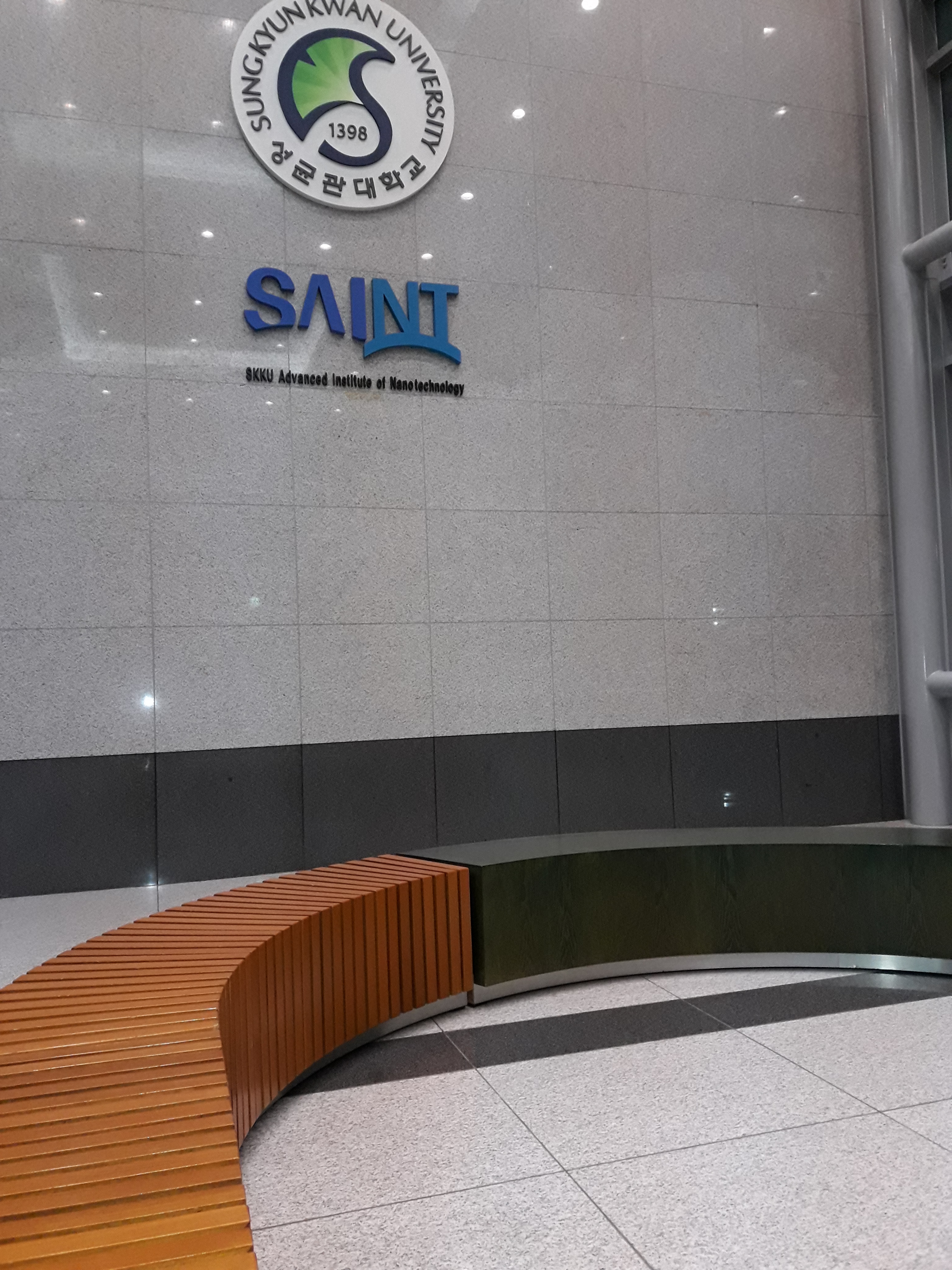
Sungkyunkwan Advanced Institute of Nanotechnology

Sungkyunkwan Advanced Institute of Nanotechnology (SAINT) was founded on 1 March 2005 as one of the four core programs of Sungkyunkwan University's VISION2010+ plan to be ranked in the top 100 universities in the world. With financial support from Samsung Advanced Institute of Technology, it aims to become one of the world's top five nanotechnology institutes. The current director of SAINT is Sungjoo Lee.

=== N-Center ===
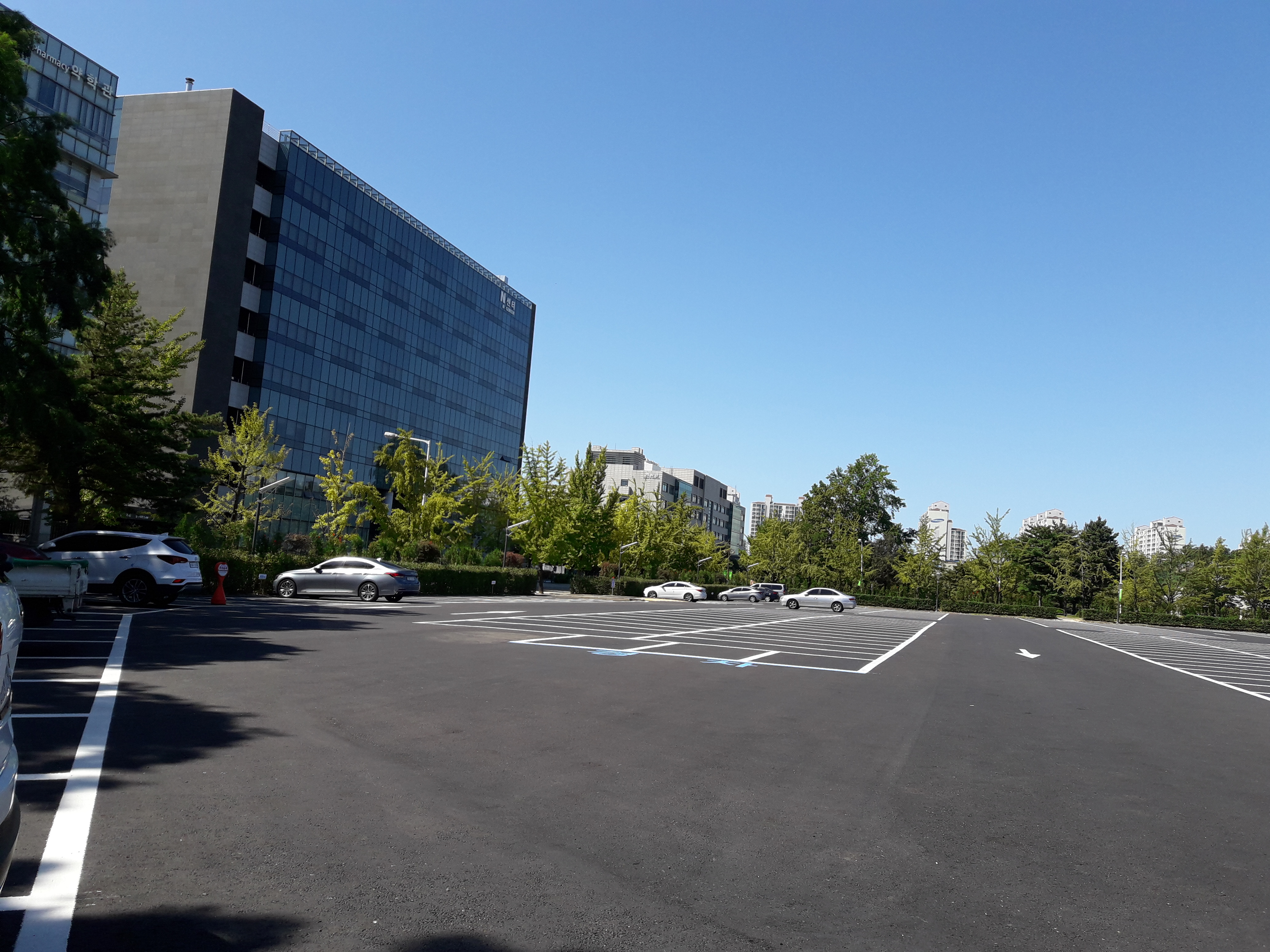
N-center

The N-Center houses the Center for Integrated Nanostructure Physics in the Institute for Basic Science, led by physics Professor Lee Young-hee, and the Center for Neuroscience Imaging Research (CNIR), led by Prof. Seong-Gi Kim.

=== School of Medicine ===
Students from the School of Medicine train at Samsung Medical Center's hospitals, and many students on campus are first-year undergraduates and postgraduate students.

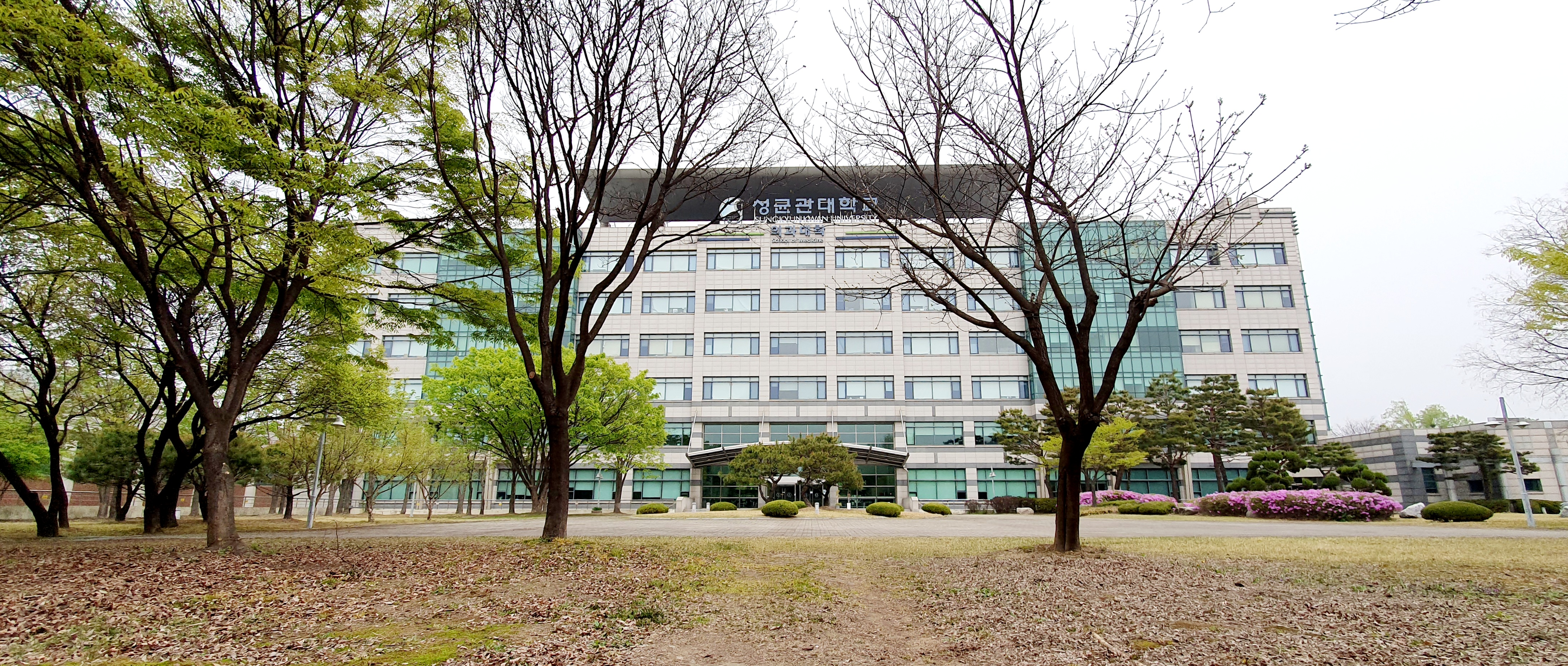
School of Medicine

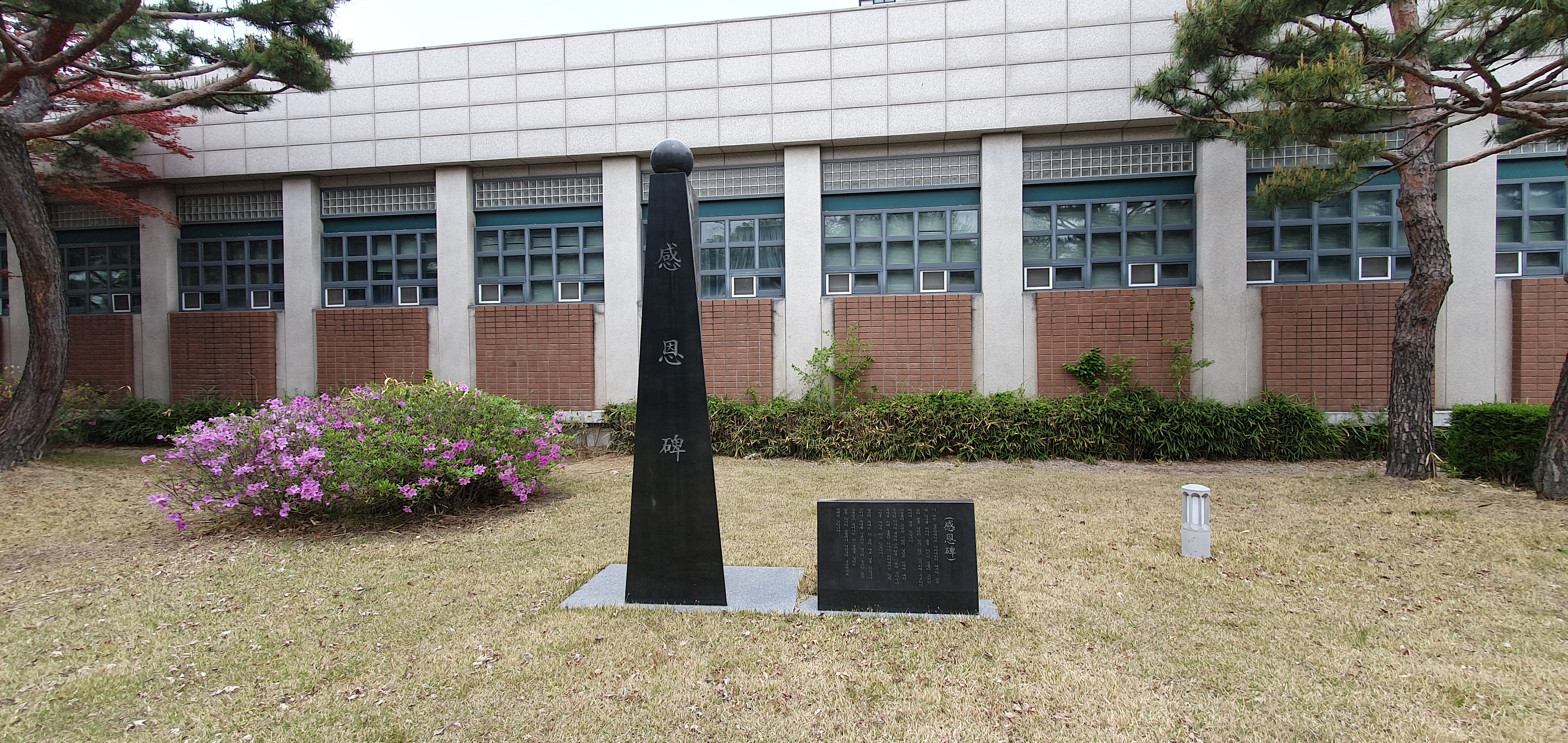
Memorial to body donors

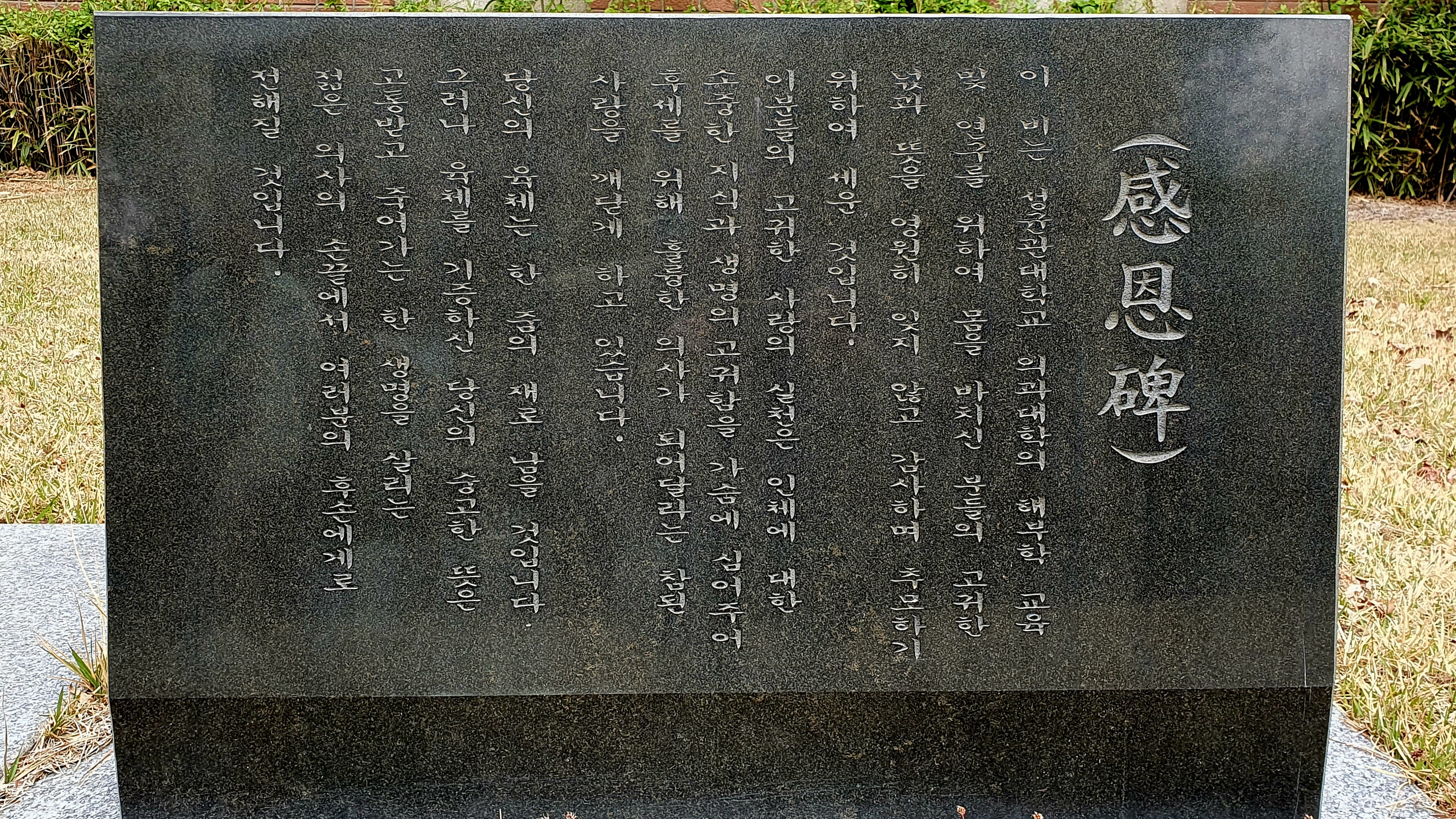
Memorial to body donors: inscription

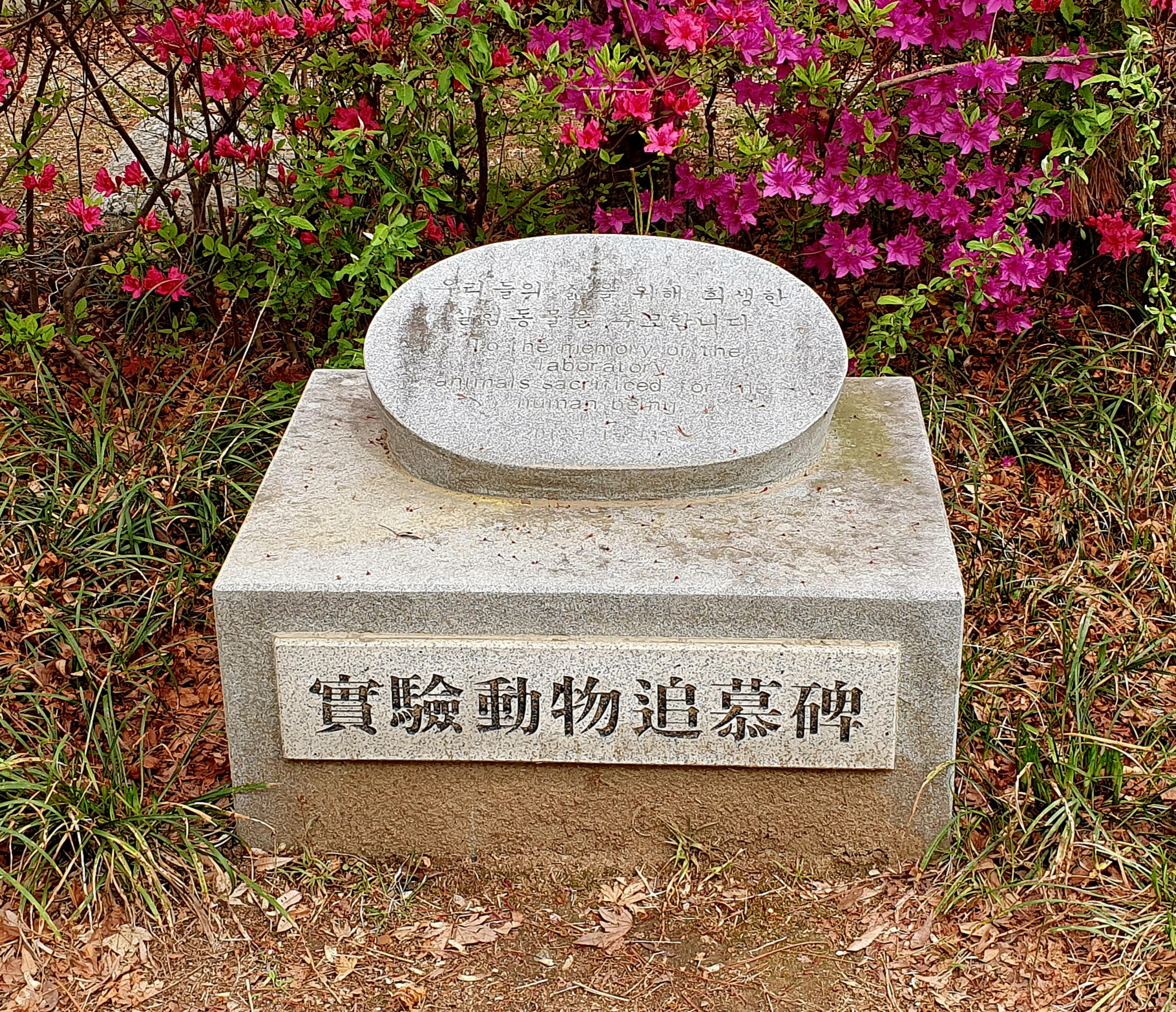
Memorial to animals

== International programs ==
Over 10% of the university's undergraduates are international students. There were over 2,700 international students enrolled at SKKU in 2013, and each year more than 2,000 Korean students from SKKU go abroad. SKKU maintains partnerships with over 653 universities in over 73 countries, and has agreements with 21 overseas institutions to offer dual-degree programs.

== Facilities ==
=== Libraries ===
In 1946, with the re-establishment of the university, Jongyeonggak, Bicheondang and Myeongnyundang were used as libraries until a new library was built. Another library opened on the Natural Sciences Campus in 1979, and a Library of Medicine was established in 1998. In 1999, the Law Library opened, and in 2000, Jongyeonggak was newly established. Samsung Library was built in 2009, and the Central Library was refurbished in 2011. In total, SKKU's libraries hold more than 2.15 million books—the ninth largest collection of books in university libraries in South Korea.

==== Samsung Library ====
Built in 2009, this library, alongside typical library functions, houses a digital media room where students can watch movies, and a sleeping arena.

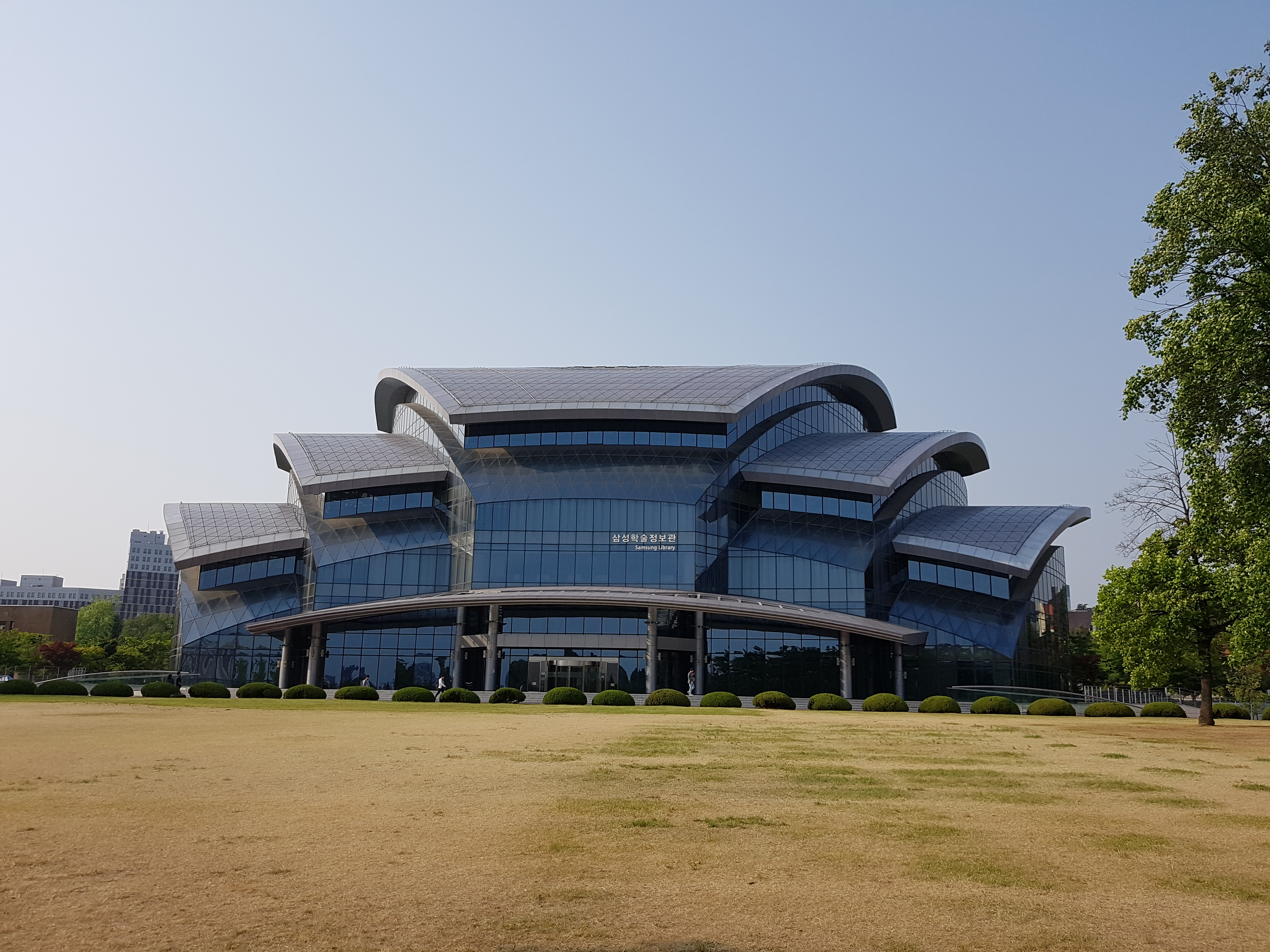
Samsung Library

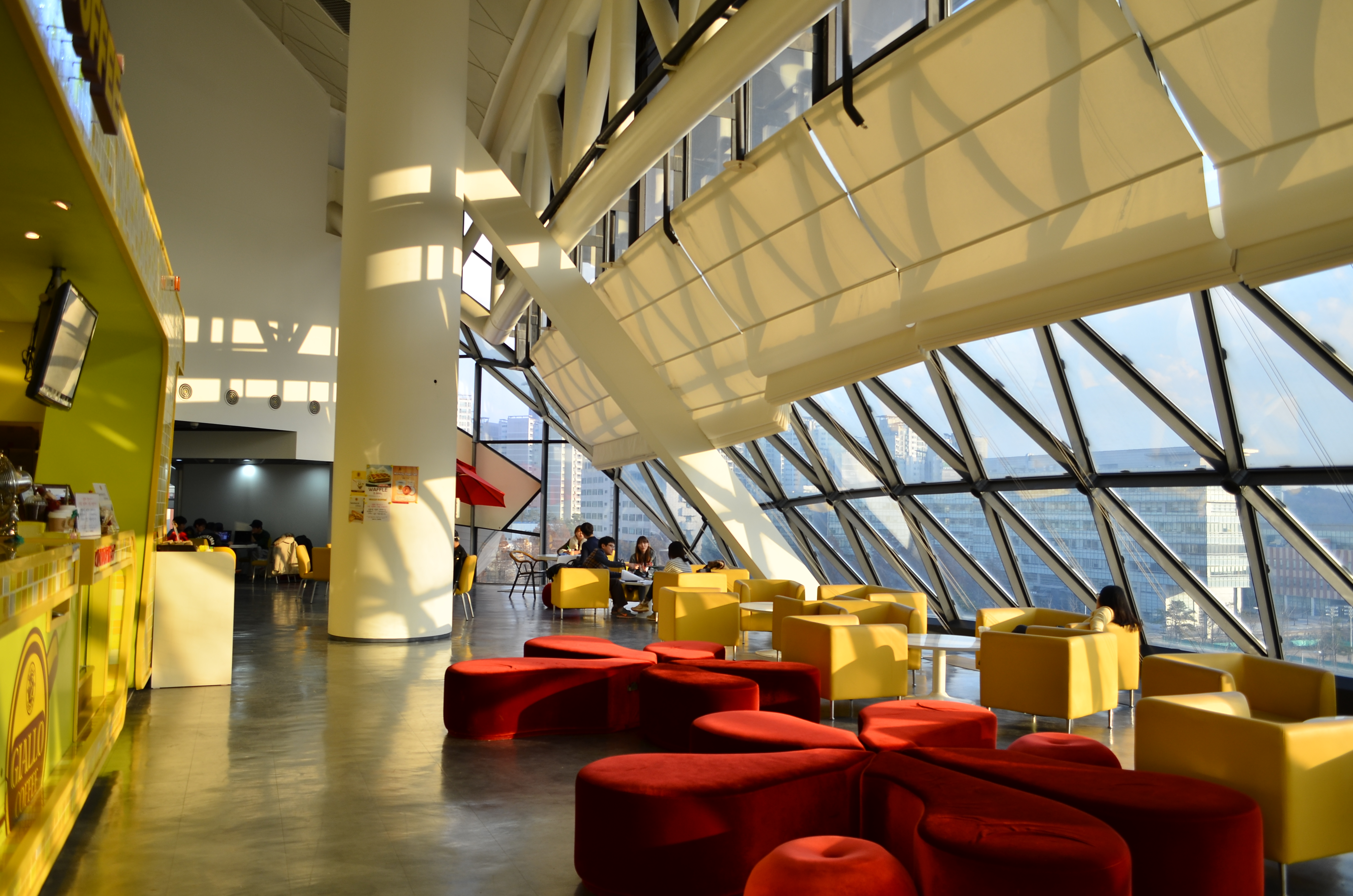
Lounge

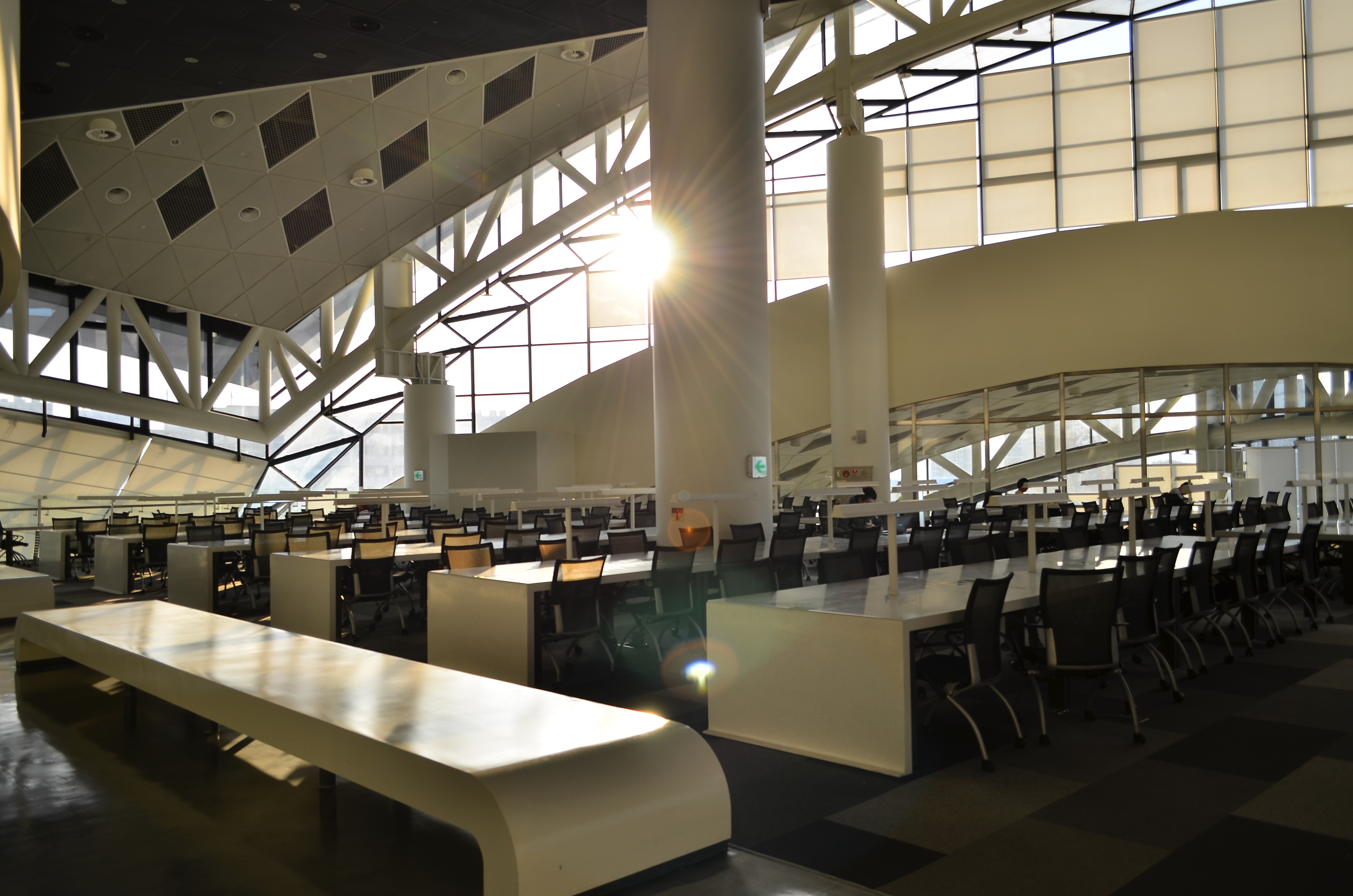
Reading room

=== Learning Factory ===
SKKU Learning Factory is a student facility at the Natural Sciences campus where creative ideas can be made physically as prototype products using 3D printers, laser cutters, CNC router, and Arduino. The center was established by the Fusion Based Creative Informatics Human Resources Development Team.

=== Sports facilities ===
Operating under the College of Sports Science, there are several student sports clubs including a baseball club, floor ball club, tennis club, basketball club, soccer club, volleyball club, and cricket club. There is a full-size soccer field, basketball court, tennis courts, athletics track, and baseball fields on the Natural Sciences Campus.

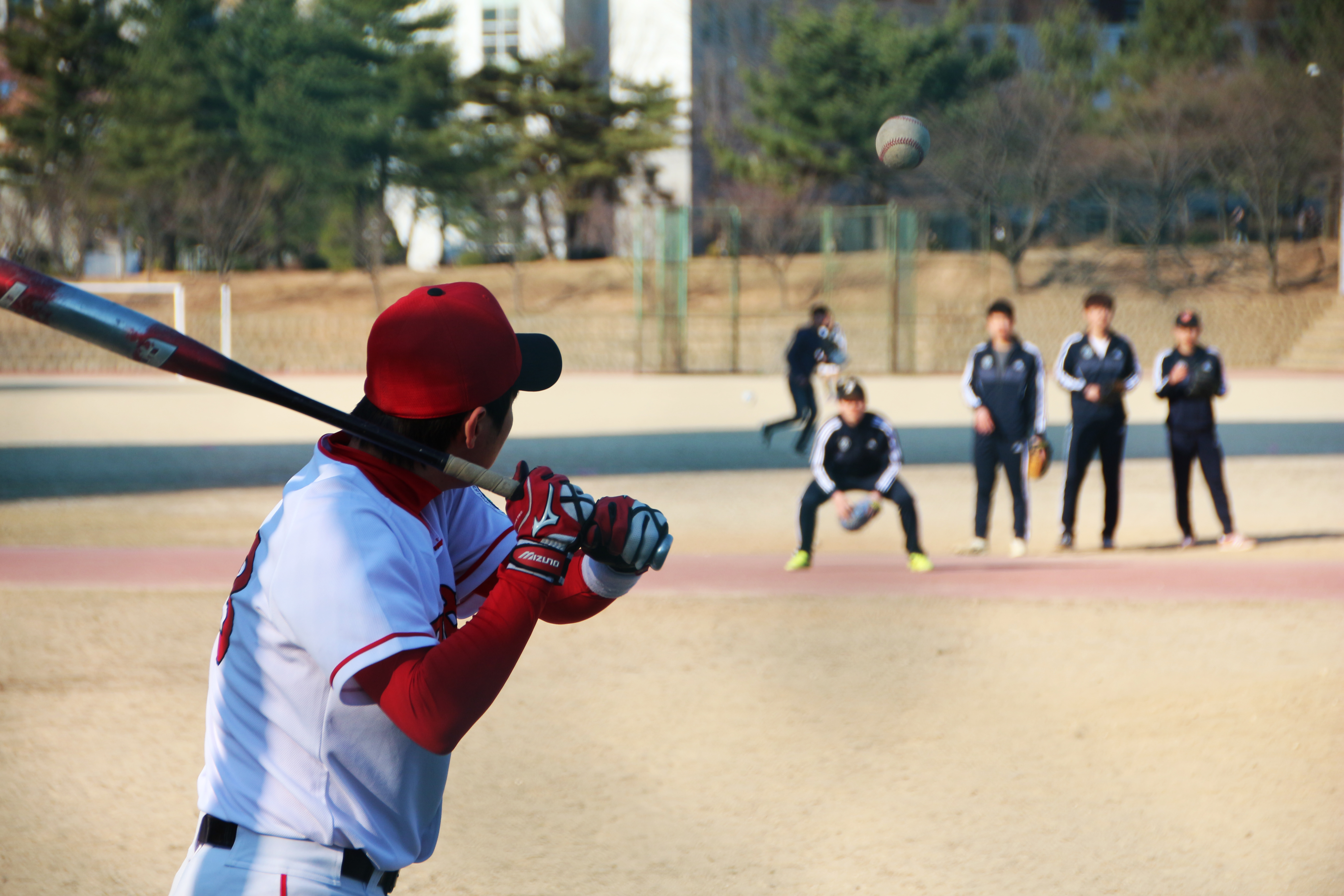
Baseball field

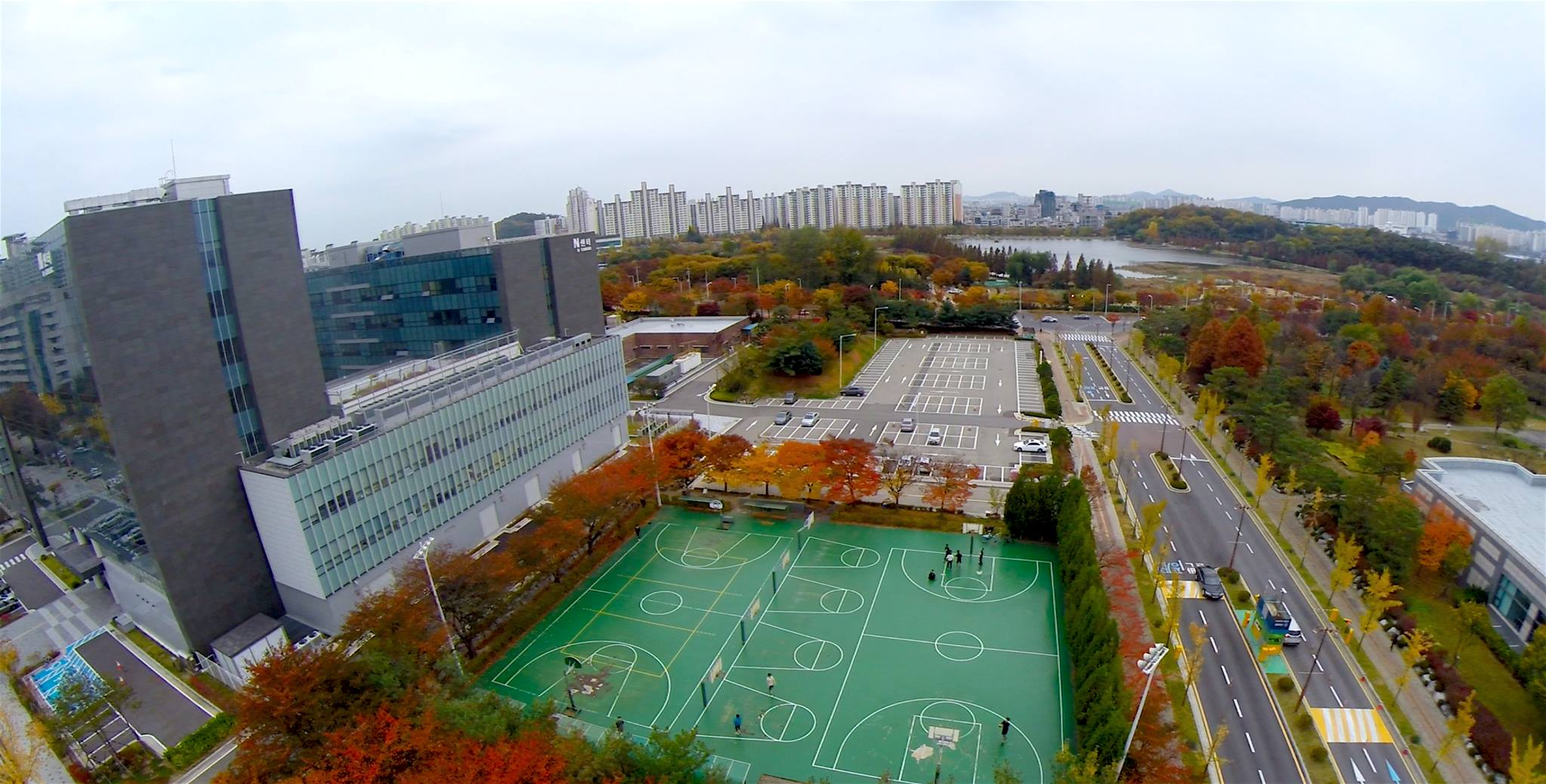
Basketball courts

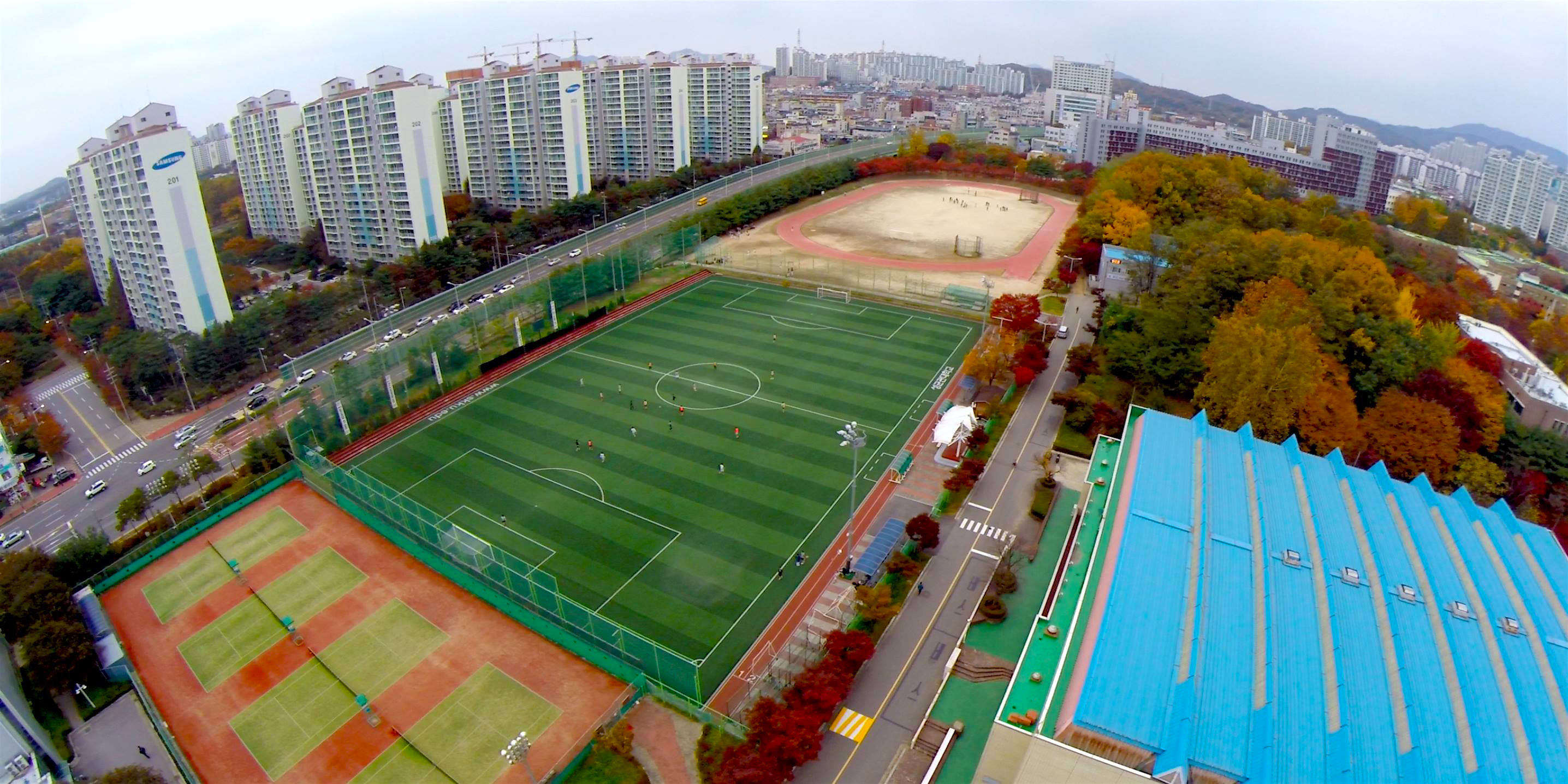
Soccer field

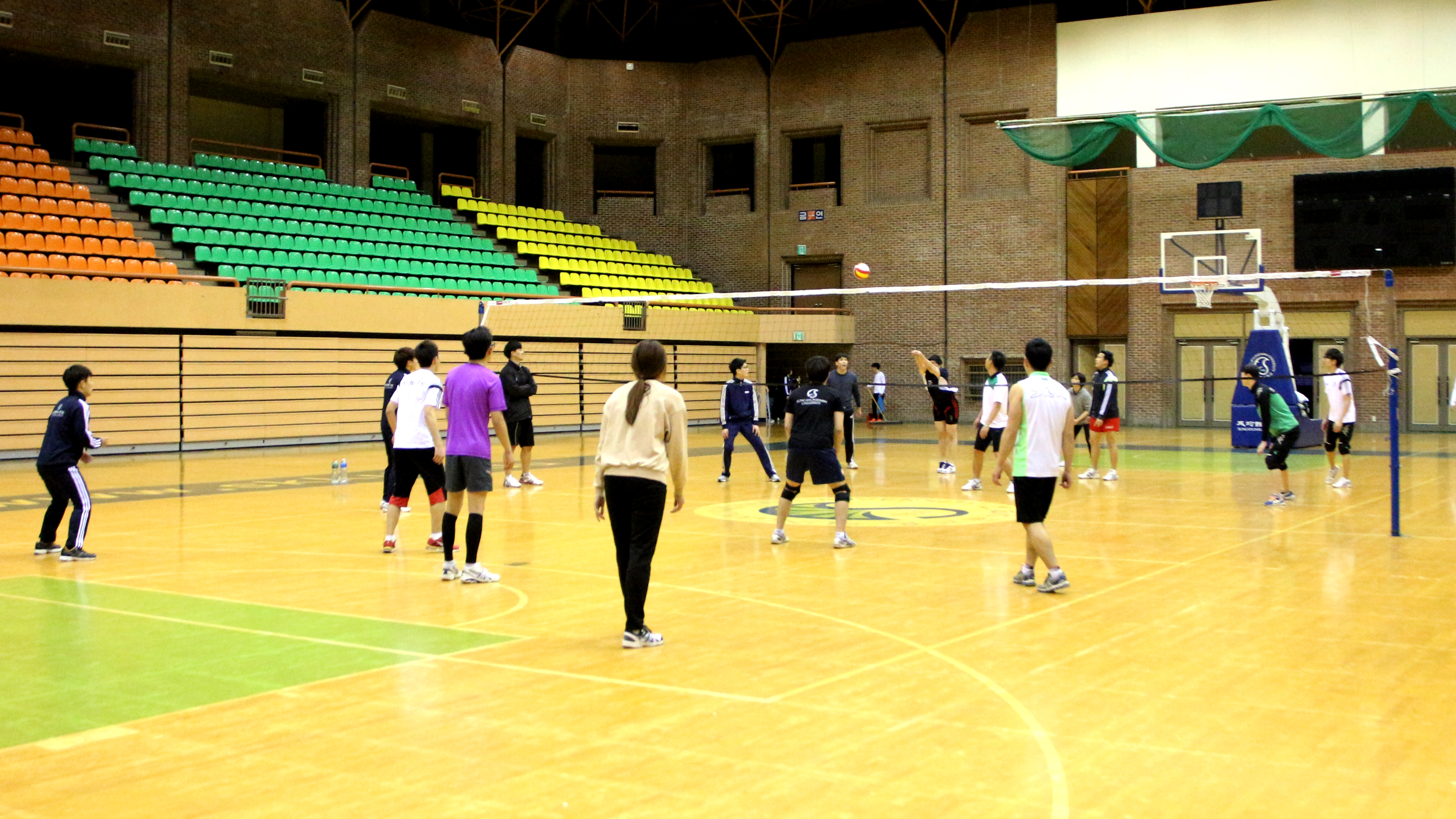
Volleyball court

== Notable alumni ==
=== Politics, diplomacy and public service ===
- Hwang Kyo-ahn (황교안), former Prime Minister of South Korea, former Acting President of South Korea
- Lee Wan-koo (이완구), former Prime Minister of South Korea
- Chung Hong-won (정홍원), former Prime Minister of South Korea
- Lee Young-jin (이영진), Justice of the Constitutional Court of Korea
- Park Byeong-seug (박병석), Chairman of the National Assembly, National Assembly member for Seo District (Daejeon)
- Yang Seung-jo (양승조), Governor of South Chungcheong Province, former National Assembly member for Cheonan
- Ko Chang-soo (고창수), former Consul General in Seattle, Washington; former Ambassador to Ethiopia and Pakistan
- Lee Jong-seok (이종석), former Minister of Unification
- Choung Byoung-gug (정병국), former Minister of Culture, Sports and Tourism, member of the National Assembly for Yeoju and Yangpyeong County
- Ahn Gyu-back (안규백), member of the National Assembly for Dongdaemun District (Seoul)
- Park Yong-jin (박용진), member of the National Assembly for Gangbuk District (Seoul)
- Choi Gyung-hwan (최경환) member of the National Assembly for Buk District (Gwangju)

=== Sports ===
- Choi Sung-beom (최성범), South Korean football player
- Han Hong-gyu (한홍규), Midfielder for Chungju Hummel FC
- Jung Kwang-seok (정광석), Retired football player and manager for Yongin City FC
- Kim Deok-il (김덕일), Forward for Seongnam FC
- Kim In-sung (김인성), Midfielder for Jeonbuk Hyundai Motors
- Kim Mi-hyun (김미현), Professional golfer
- Lee Ho-jin (이호진), Defender
- Lee Jong-won (이종원), Midfielder for Seongnam FC
- Lee Sang-gi (이상기), Goalkeeper for Suwon FC
- Lim Joong-yong (임중용), Retired football player and coach
- Lim Sung-jin (임성진), volleyball player for Suwon KEPCO Vixtorm
- Mo Chang-min (모창민), Infielder for NC Dinos
- No Jin-hyuk (노진혁), Shortstop for NC Dinos
- Yoon Deok-yeo (윤덕여), Retired football player and coach
- Kim Byung-hyun (김병현), Former Major League Baseball Pitcher
- Jeon Kwang-in (전광인), Men's National Volleyball Player
- Seo Jae-duck (서재덕), Men's National Volleyball Player

=== Entertainment ===
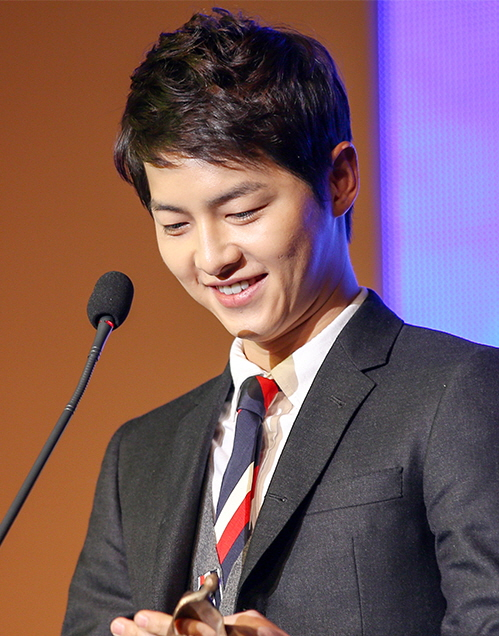
Song Joong-ki

- Bae Yong-joon (배용준), Actor and businessman
- Carlos Gorito (카를로스 고리토), South Korea-based Brazilian television personality
- Cha Eun-woo (차은우), Actor and member of South Korean boy band Astro
- Eunseo (은서), Member of South Korean-Chinese girl group WJSN
- Go Ah-sung (고아성), Actress
- Han Soo-yeon (한수연), Actress
- Heo Nam-jun (허남준), Actor
- Heo Young-joo (허영주), Former member of South Korean girl group The SeeYa
- Hwang In-sun (황인선), Singer
- Hyomin (효민), Actress and member of South Korean girl group T-ara
- Jeon Sung-woo (전성우), Actor
- Ji Hyun-woo (지현우), Actor
- Jo Bo-ah (조보아), Actress
- Joo Won (주원), Actor
- Jung Hye-sung (정혜성), Actress
- Kang Ji-young (강지영), Actress and former member of South Korean girl group KARA
- Kim Dae-myung (김대명), Actor
- Kim Ga-young (김가영), Actress and former member of South Korean girl group Stellar
- Kim Hye-soo (김혜수), Actress
- Kim Mu-yeol (김무열), Actor
- Kim Nam-joo (김남주), Member of South Korean girl group Apink
- Ko Sung-hee (고성희), Actress
- Krystal Jung (정수정), Korean-American actress and member of South Korean girl group f(x)
- Kwak Jung-wook (곽정욱), Actor
- Ku Hye-sun (구혜선), Actress
- Lee El (이엘), Actress
- Lee Min-jung (이민정), Actress
- Lee Si-a (이시아), Actress and former member of South Korean girl group CHI CHI
- Lee Tae-hwan (이태환), Actor and former member of South Korean boy band 5urprise
- Moon Ga-young (문가영), Actress
- Moon Geun-young (문근영), Actress
- Moon So-ri (문소리), Actress
- Park Chul-soo (박철수), Film director and screenwriter
- Park Joo-mi (박주미), Actress
- Park Kang-hyun (박강현), Musical theater actor, crossover artist, singer, and TV drama actor
- Park Se-wan (박세완), Actress
- Park Sol-mi (박솔미), Actress
- Park So-hyun (박소현), Actress
- Seo Ji-hye (서지혜), Actress
- Seo Shin-ae (서신애), Actress
- Shin Ye-eun (신예은), Actress
- Song Joong-ki (송중기), Actor
- Swings (문지훈), Rapper
- Uee (유이), Actress and former member of South Korean girl group After School
- Yang Hye-ji (양혜지), Actress

=== Historical figures ===
Historical figures:

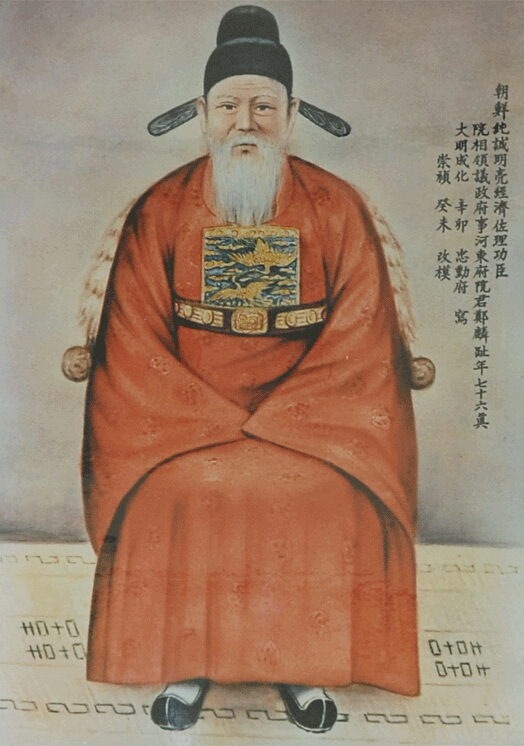
Chŏng Inji (1396-1478): Entered in 1411. Yŏngŭijŏng who contributed to the development of culture and science in the early Joseon Dynasty.

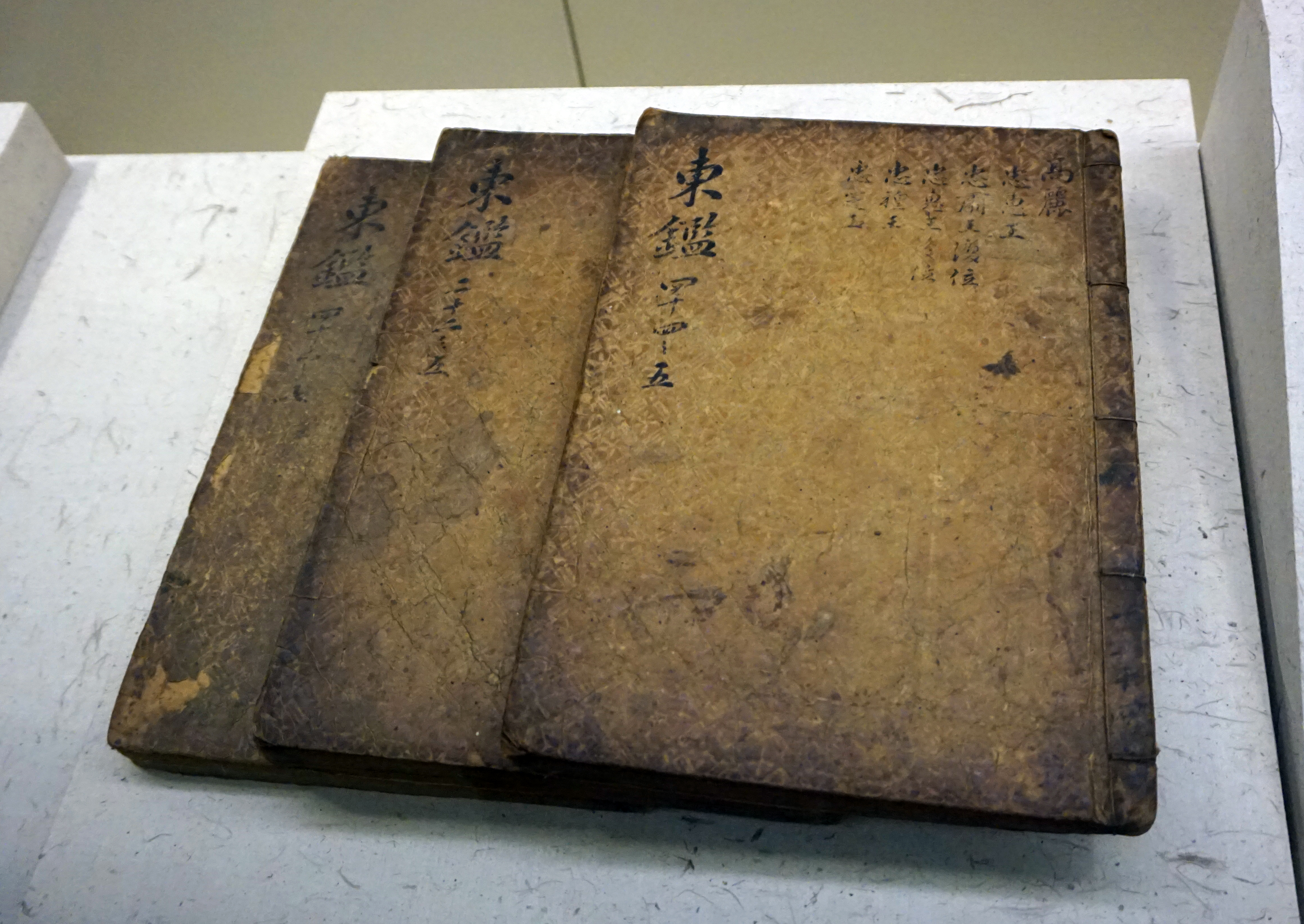
Ch'oe Hang (1409-1474): Entered in 1434. Civil minister, compiled the Kyŏngguk taejŏn.

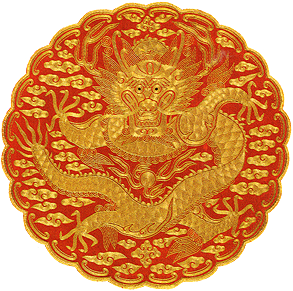
Munjong (1414-1452): Entered in 1421. The first Crown Prince to enter Sungkyunkwan.

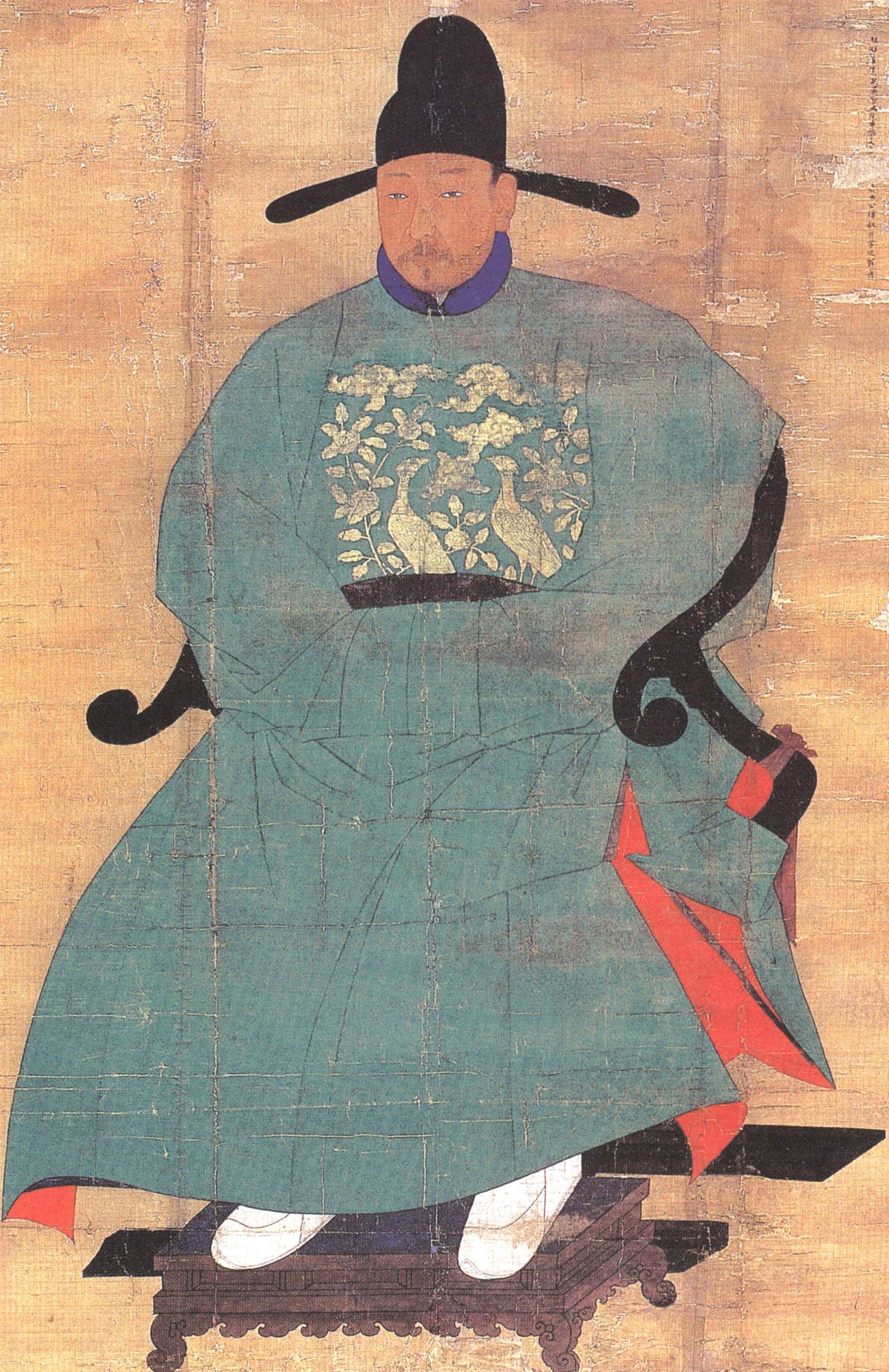
Sin Sukchu (1417-1475): Entered in 1438. Politician and diplomat of the early Joseon Dynasty.

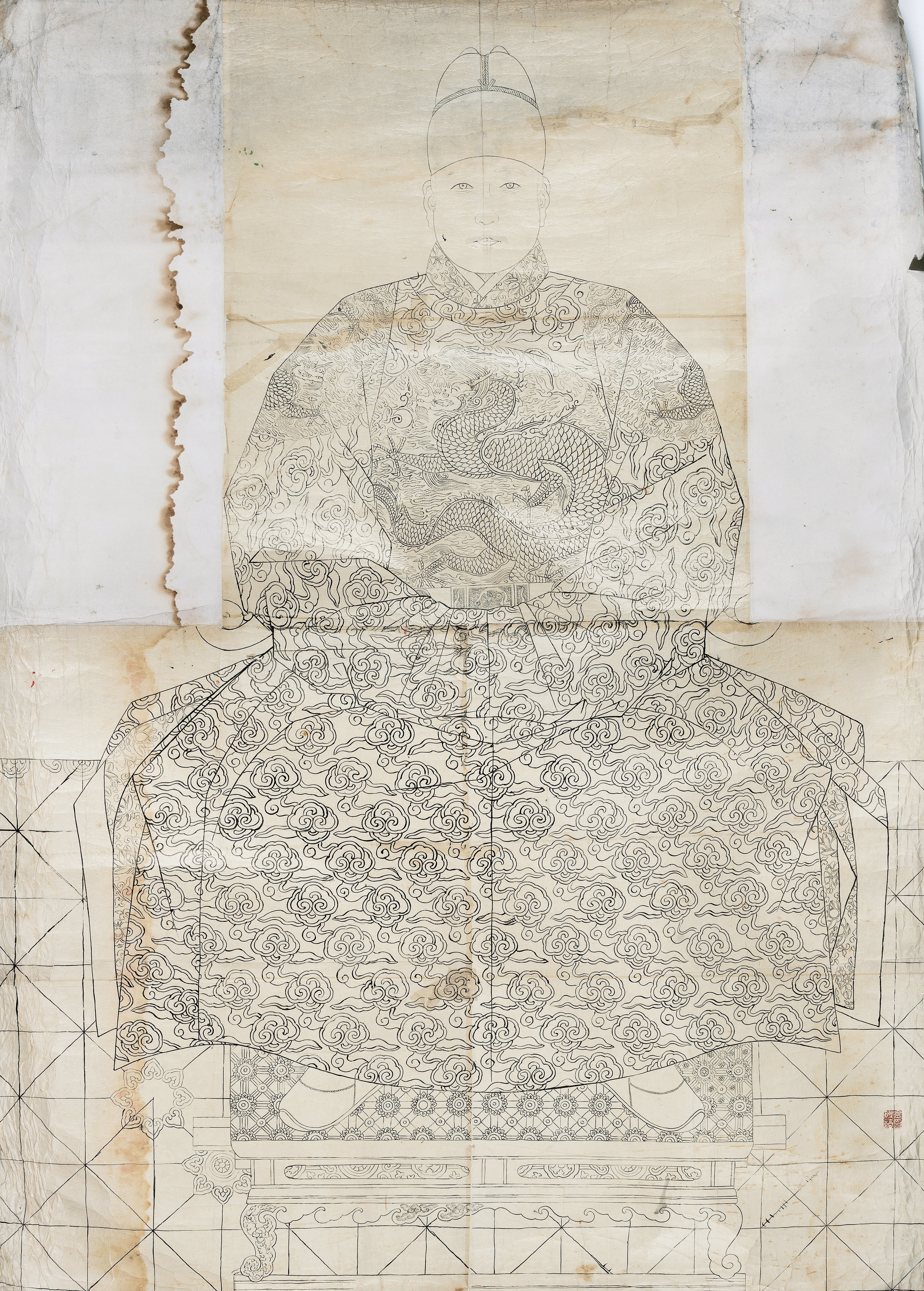
King Sejo (1417-1468): Entered in 1430. Seventh king of the Joseon Dynasty.

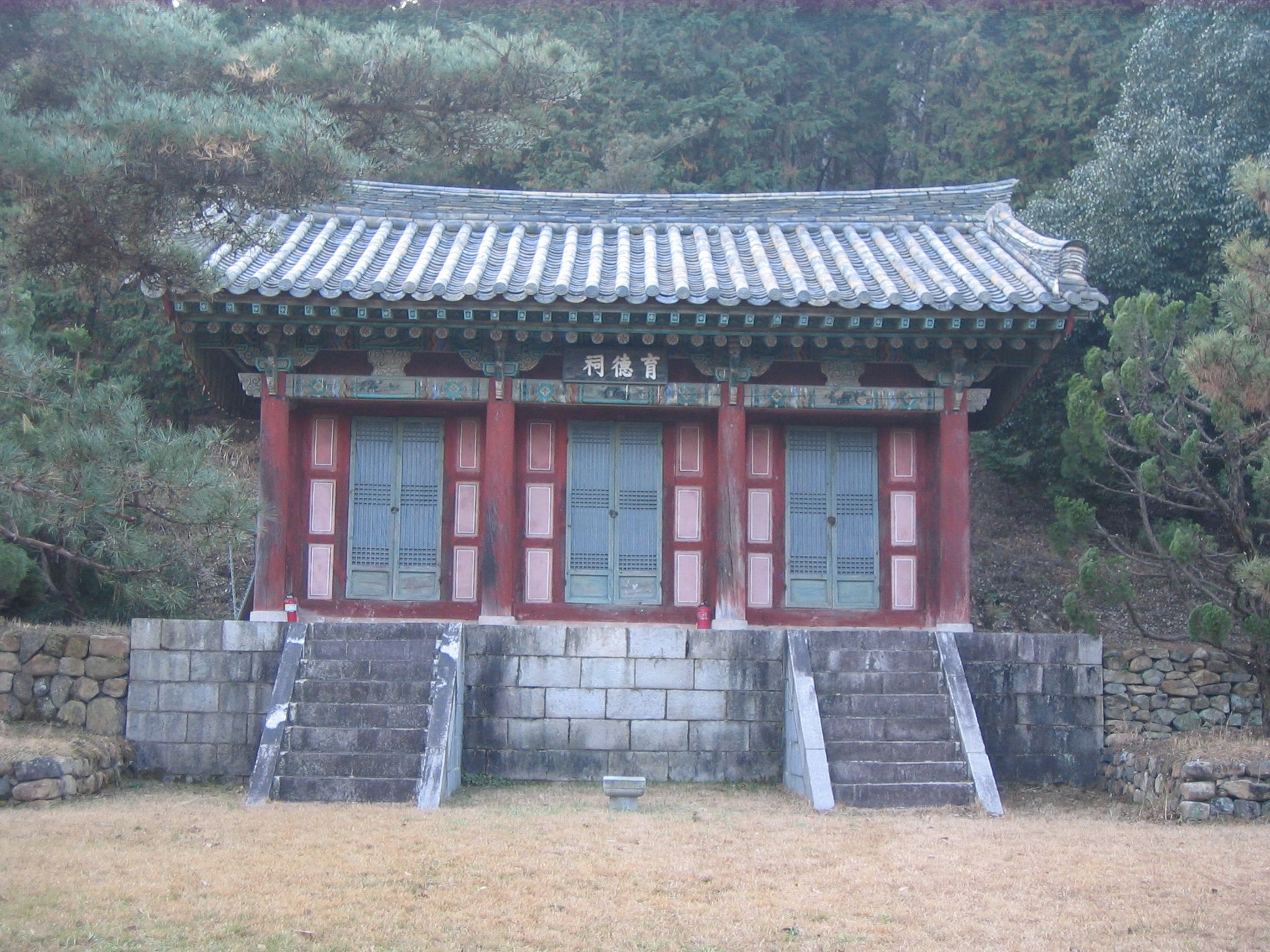
Kim Chong-jik (1431-1492): Entered in 1453. Compiled Tongguk yŏji sŭngnam.

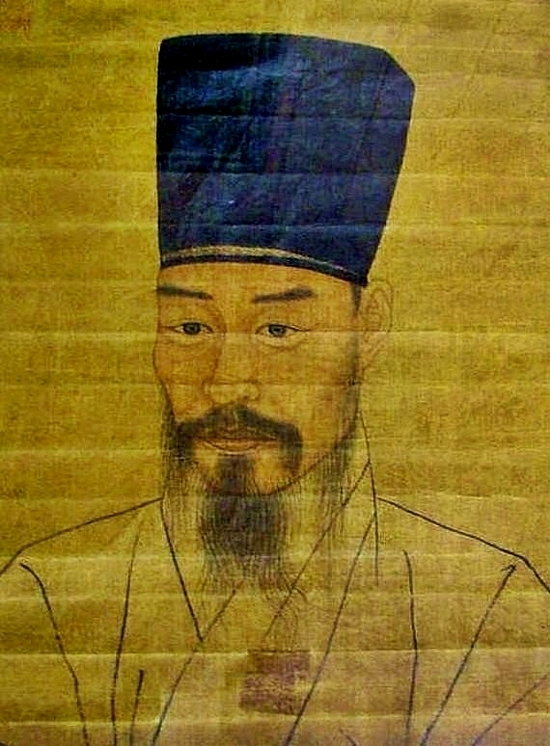
Cho Kwangjo (1482-1519): Entered in 1510. Munmyo Baehyang (문묘배향; 文廟配享). Promoted Hyangyak throughout the country.

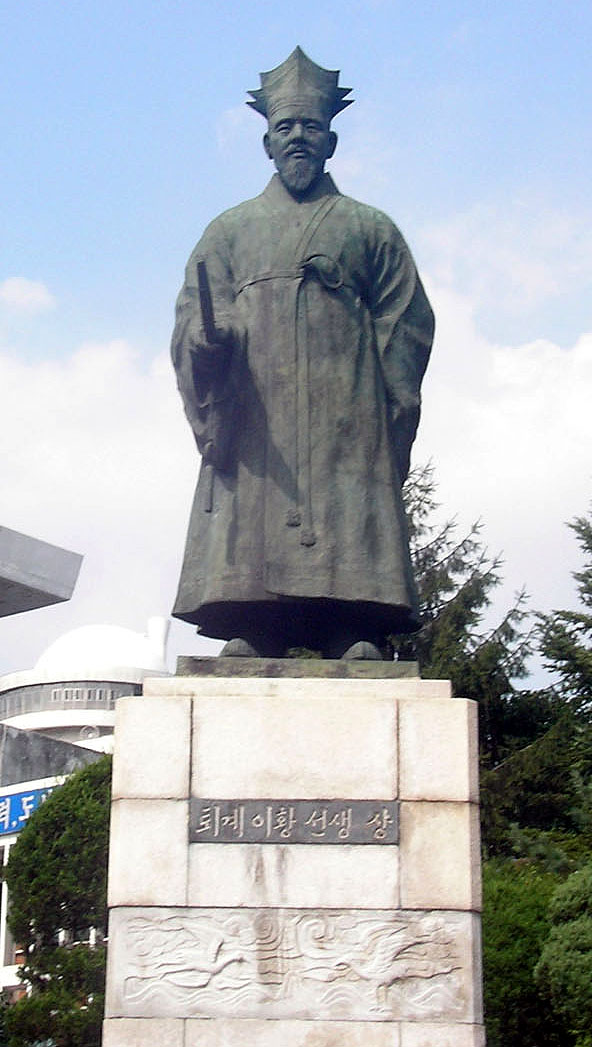
Yi Hwang (1501–1570): Entered in 1523. Wrote The Ten Diagrams on Sage Learning (성학십도; 聖學十圖).

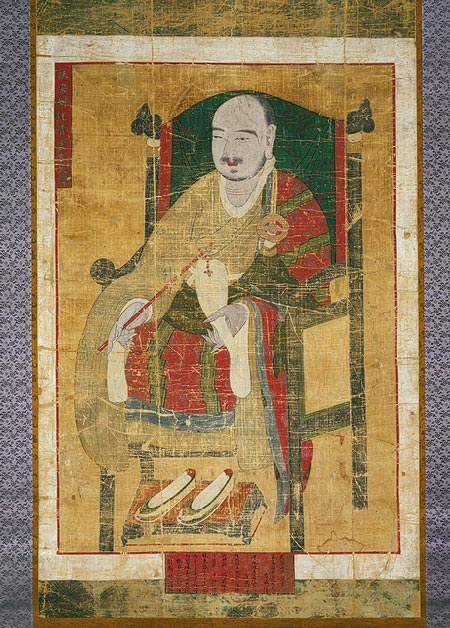
Hyujeong (1520-1604): Entered in 1537. Warrior monk during the Japanese invasions of Korea (1592–1598).

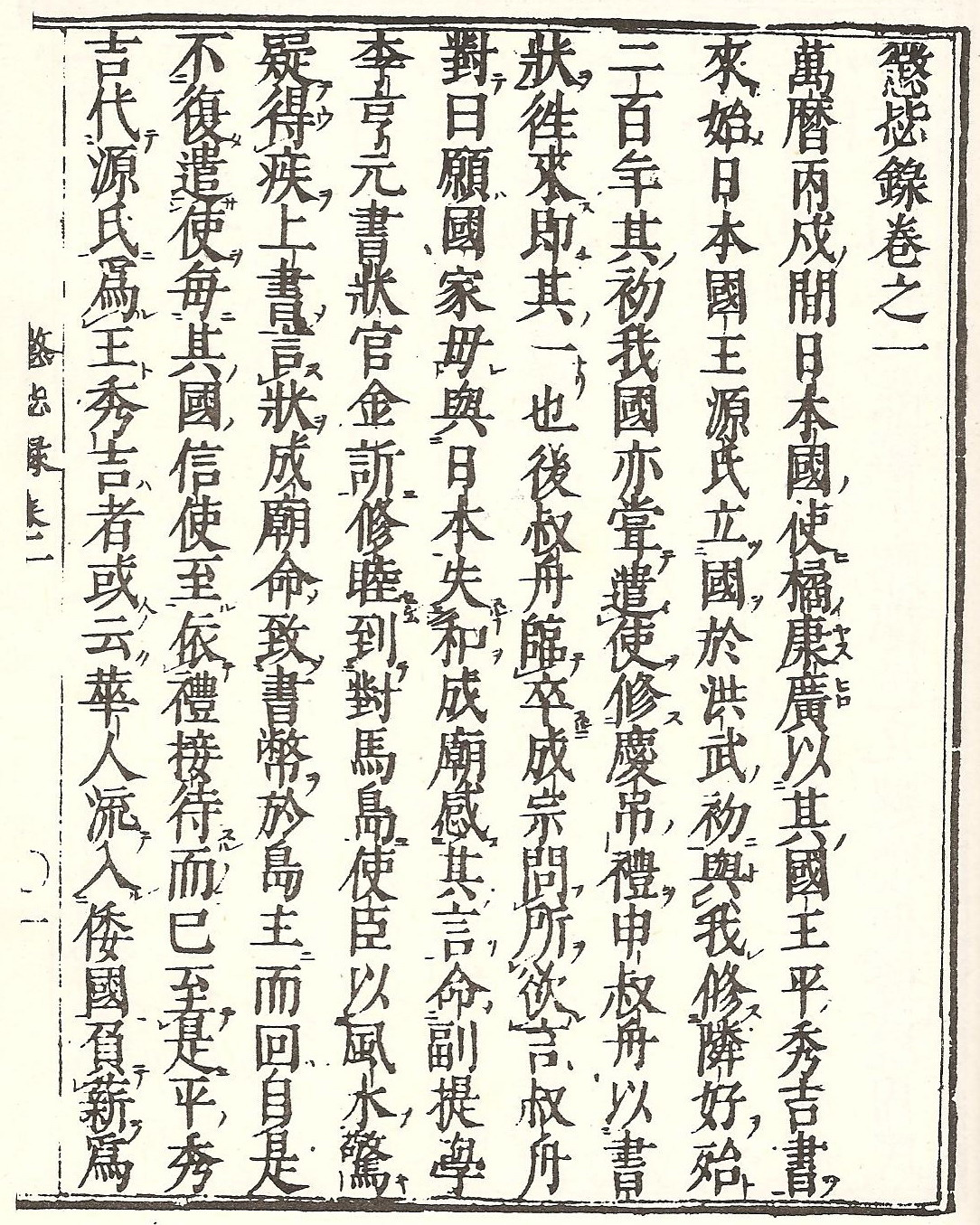
Yu Sŏngnyong (1542-1607): Entered in 1565. Yŏngŭijŏng during the Japanese invasions of Korea (1592–1598). Wrote Jingbirok.

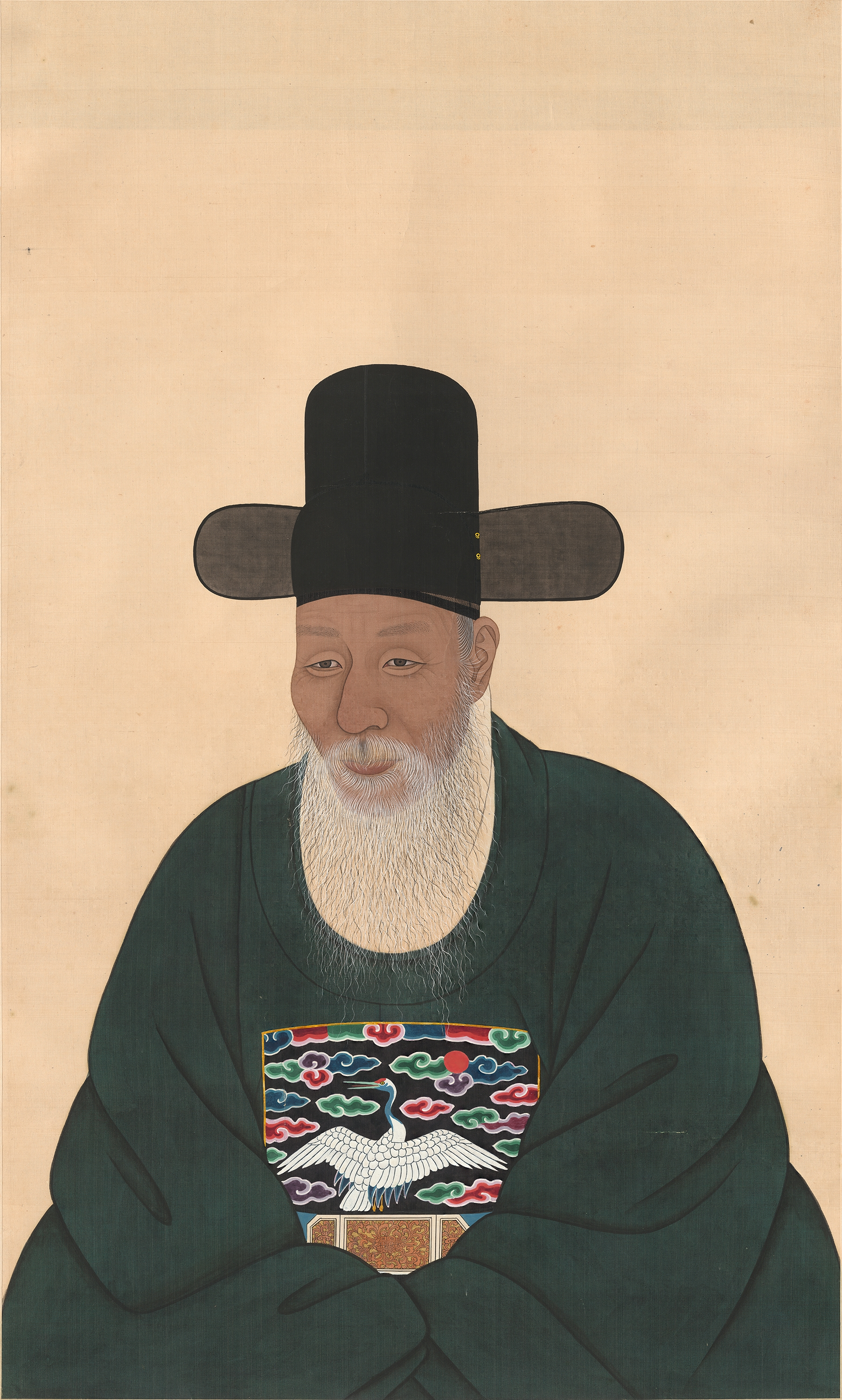
Kim Jang-saeng (1548-1631): Entered in 1623. Sa-eob of Sungkyunkwan (성균관사업; 成均館司業), Munmyo Baehyang (문묘배향; 文廟配享).

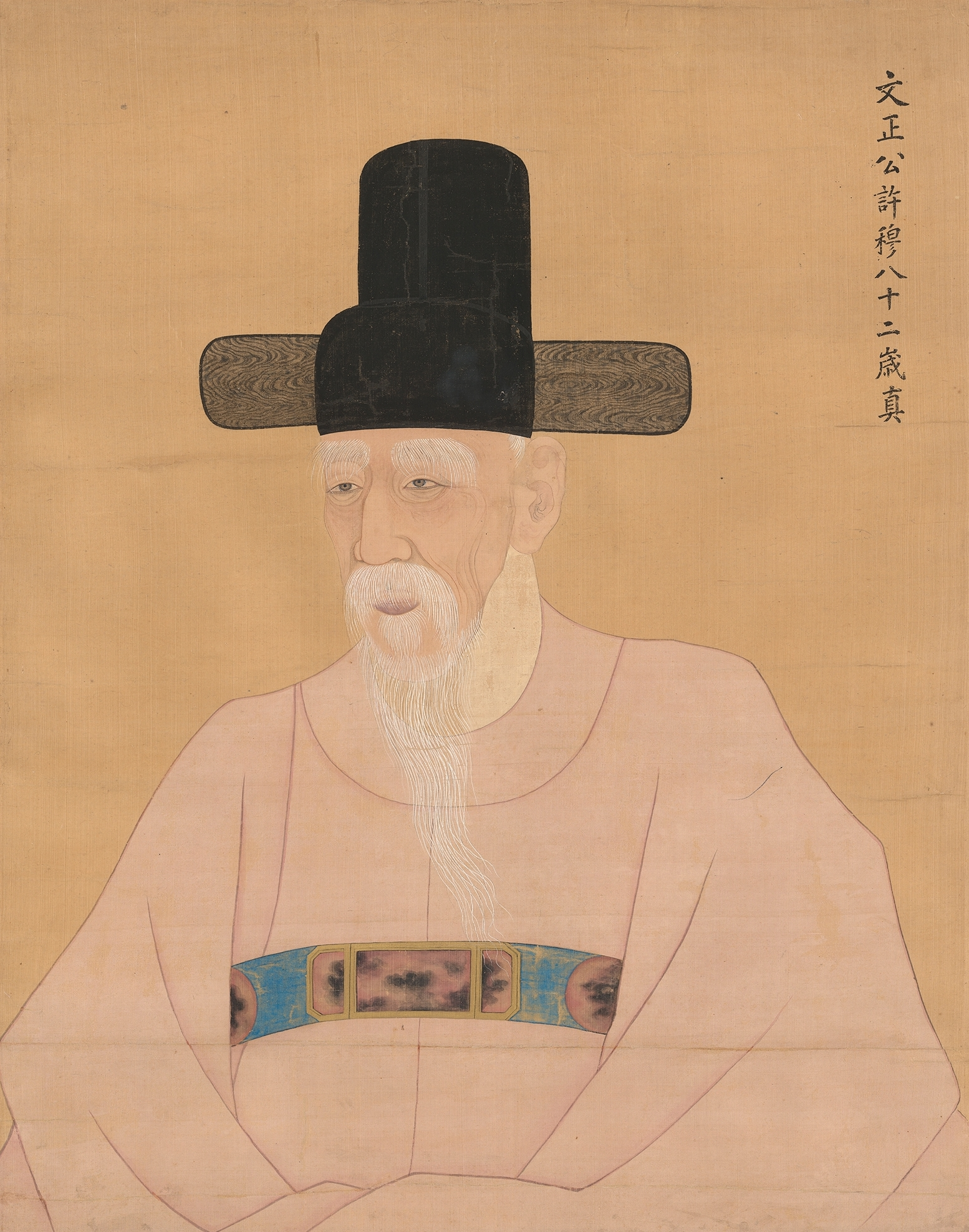
Hŏ Mok (1565-1682): Entered in 1675. Cheju of Sungkyunkwan (성균관제주; 成均館祭酒)

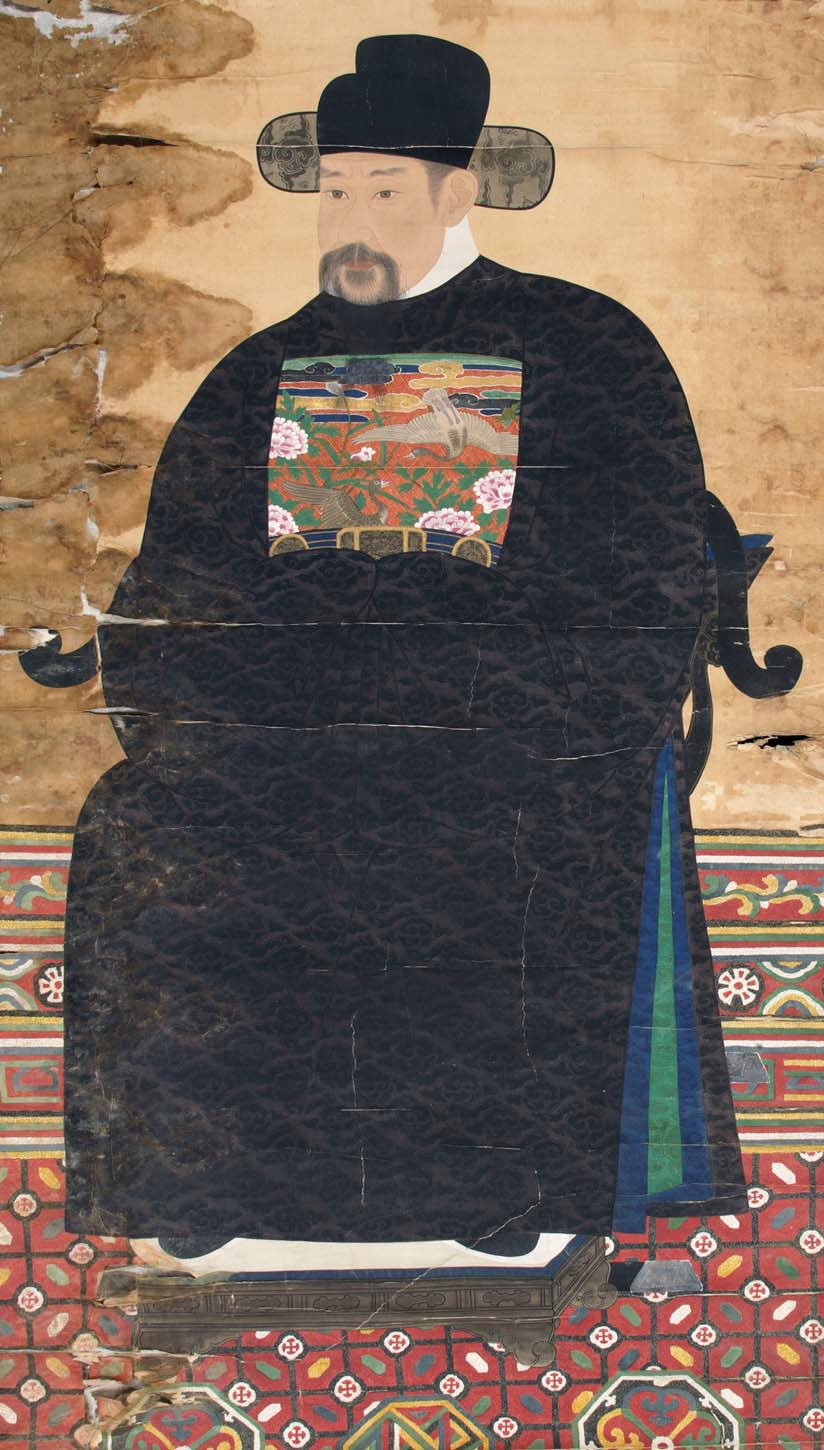
Yun Hyu (1617-1680): Entered in 1675. Saŏp of Sungkyunkwan (성균관사업; 成均館司業), Criticized the doctrine of Zhu Xi.

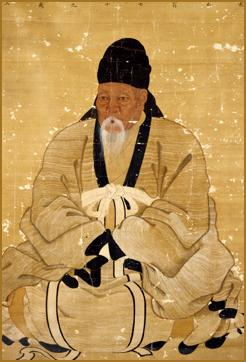
Gwon Sang-ha (1641-1721): Entered in 1660. Criticized the theory that human and animal nature are the same (인물성동론; 人物性同論; Inmulseongdonglon)

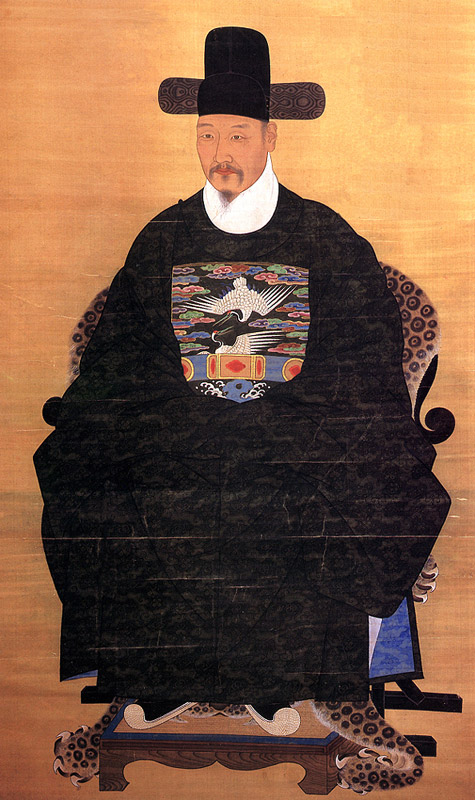
Bak Mun-su (1691-1756): Jeonjeok of Sungkyunkwan (성균관전적; 成均館典籍), Worked as a secret royal inspector.

King Yeongjo (1694-1776): Entered in 1722. Implemented the Policy of Impartiality (탕평책; 蕩平策), the Equalized Tax Law (균역법; 均役法)

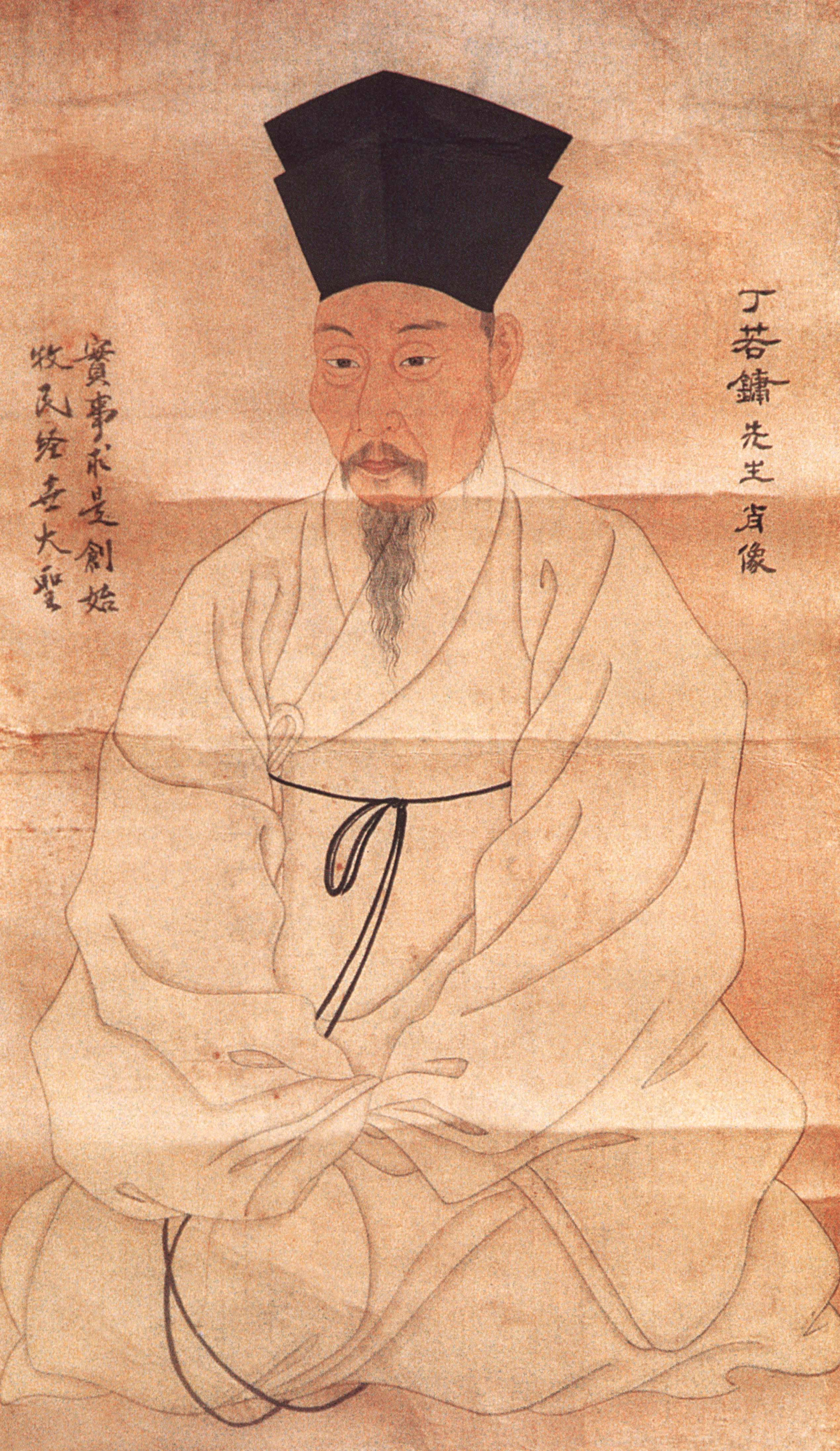
Chŏng Yagyong (1762-1836): Entered in 1783. Famous scholar of the Silhak movement (실학; 實學). Wrote over 500 books, including Mongmin Simseo (목민심서; 牧民心書), Gyeongse yupyo (경세유표; 經世遺表).

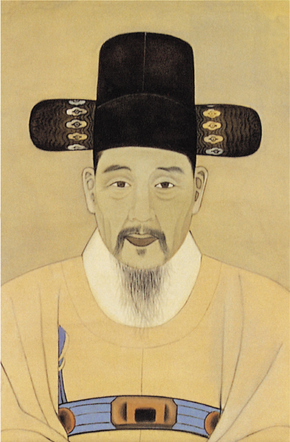
Pak Kyusu (1807-1877): Entered in 1827. Pioneer of the enlightenment group.

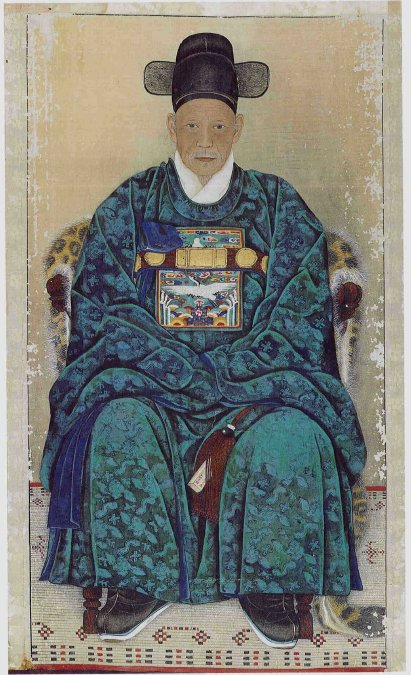
Choe Ik-hyeon (1833-1906): Entered in 1854. Uijong Cheoksa activities, Righteous Army activities in 1895, 1905.

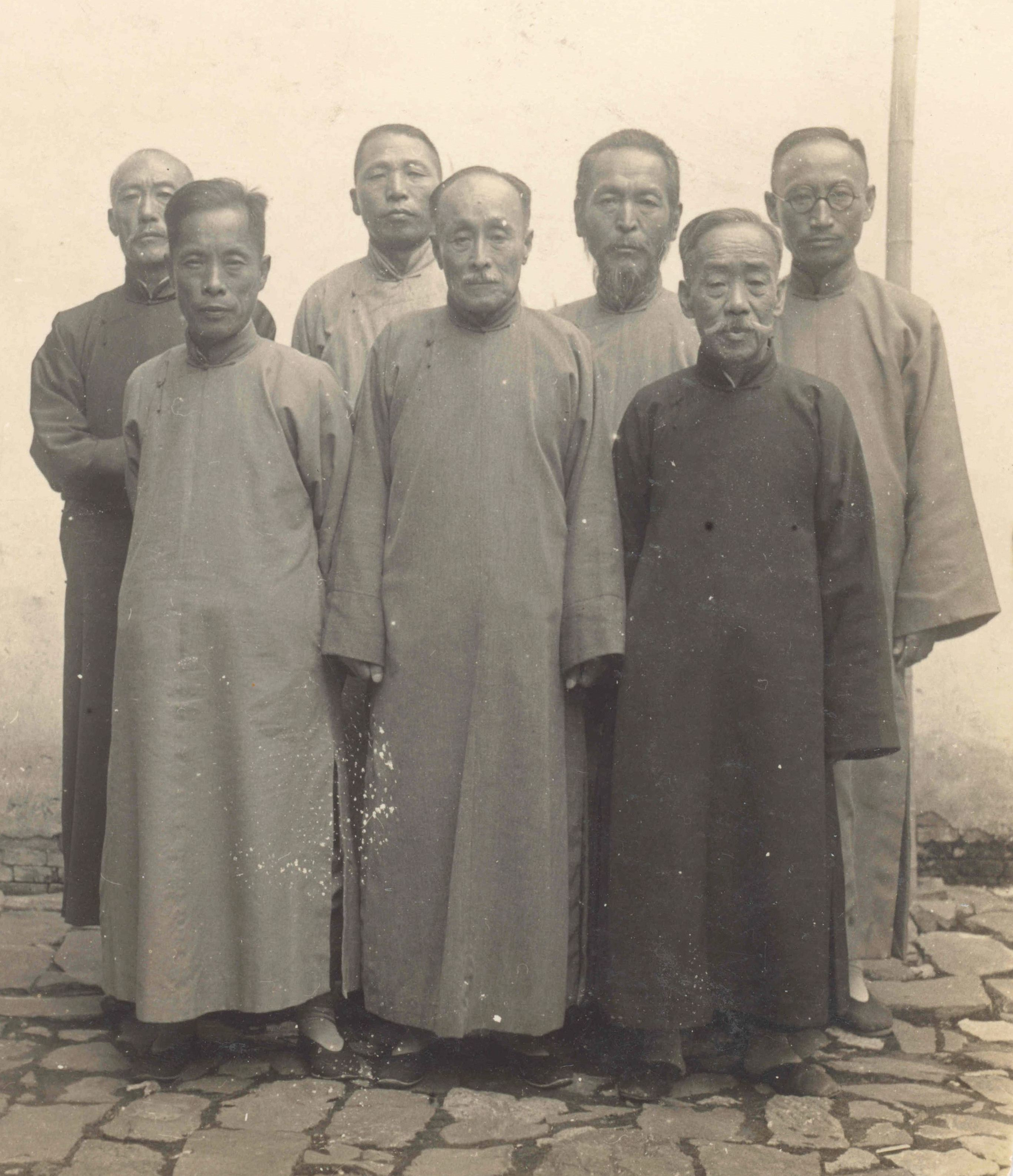
Yi Dong-nyeong (1869-1940): Entered in 1892. Independence activist. President of the Provisional Government of the Republic of Korea in exile in Shanghai, China.

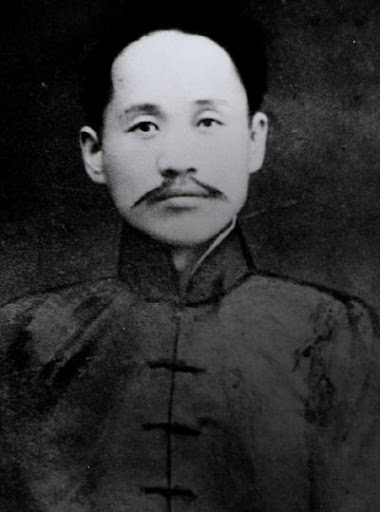
Sin Chaeho (1880-1936): Ph.D. 1905. Independence activist, historian. Wrote Ancient History of Korea (조선상고사; 朝鮮上古史; Joseon Sanggo Sa)

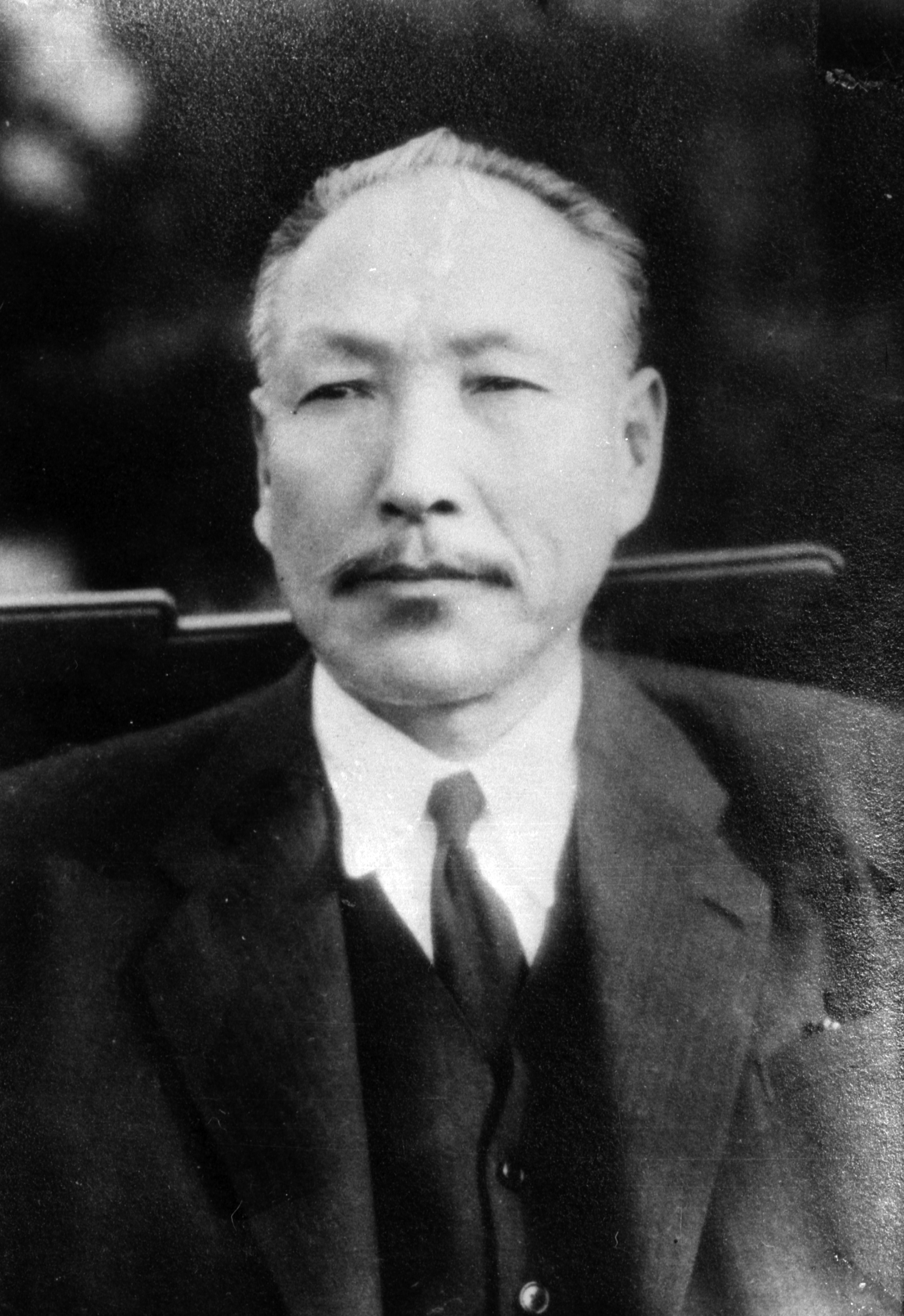
Jo So-ang (1887-1959): Entered in 1902. Wrote the Daehan Independence Declaration (대한독립선언서; 大韓獨立宣言書). Advocated the Three Principles of the Equality.

== See also ==
- List of universities and colleges in South Korea
- Education in the Joseon Dynasty
- Sungkyunkwan
- Education in South Korea
- Daehangno
- Samsung Global Scholarship Program
