= Daedeok Innopolis =

Science park in Daejeon, South Korea

Coordinates: 36°22′41″N 127°23′37″E

- Established: 1973
- Location: Daejeon

- Daedeok Innopolis
- Hangul: 대덕연구단지
- Hanja: 大德硏究團地
- RR: Daedeok yeongu danji
- MR: Taedŏk yŏn'gu tanji

Daedeok Innopolis, formerly known as Daedeok Science Town, is a research and development district in Yuseong District, Daejeon, South Korea. The plan to concentrate research institutes and universities was made in 1967 and president Park Chunghee approved subsequent master planning in 1973.

== Overview ==
Now the district contains over 20 major research institutes and over 40 corporate research centers. There are 232 research and educational institutions to be found in Daejeon, many in the Daedeok region, among them the Electronics and Telecommunications Research Institute and the Korea Aerospace Research Institute. A number of IT venture companies have sprung up in this region due to the high concentration of Ph.Ds in the applied sciences.

Korea has invested heavily in building up the research expertise for over 30 years, creating long-term research programs. Over 17,000 PhD researchers are in the sciences in Daedeok and it had the most application for patents during 2000–2011 among the National Industrial Complex. The "town" will provide a core for the International Science and Business Belt.

The Daedeok Innopolis logo was created by the industrial design company INNO Design in Palo Alto, USA.

== Institutes ==
=== Government agencies ===
- Agency for Defense Development (국방과학연구소, ADD)
- Electronics and Telecommunications Research Institute (한국전자통신연구원, ETRI)
- Institute for Basic Science (기초과학연구소, IBS) (hosts RAON)
- International Intellectual Property Training Institute
- Korea Aerospace Research Institute (한국항공우주연구원, KARI)
- Korea Astronomy and Space Science Institute (한국천문연구원, KASI)
- Korea Atomic Energy Research Institute (한국원자력연구원, KAERI)
- Korea Basic Science Institute (한국기초과학지원연구원, KBSI)
- Korea Institute of Energy Research (한국에너지기술연구원, KIER)
- Korea Institute of Geoscience and Mineral Resources (한국지질자원연구원, KIGAM)
- Korea Institute of Machinery & Materials (한국기계연구원, KIMM)
- Korea Institute of Nuclear Nonproliferation and Control (한국원자력통제기술원, KINAC)
- Korea Institute of Nuclear Safety (한국원자력안전기술원, KINS)
- Korea Institute of Oriental Medicine (한국한의학연구원, KIOM)
- Korea Institute of R&D Human Resource Development Daejeon Center
- Korea Institute of Science and Technology Information (한국과학기술정보연구원, KISTI)
- Korea Institute of Toxicology (안정성평가연구소, KIT)
- Korea Research Institute of Bioscience and Biotechnology (한국생명공학연구원, KRIBB)
- Korea Research Institute of Chemical Technology (한국화학연구원, KRICT)
- Korea Research Institute of Standards and Science (한국표준과학연구원, KRISS)
- Korea Institute of Fusion Energy (한국핵융합기술연구원, KFE) (hosts KSTAR)
- National Forensic Service Daejeon Institute
- National Information Resources Service
- National Institute for Mathematical Sciences (국가수리과학연구소, NIMS)
- National NanoFab Center (나노종합기술원, NNFC)
- National Research Foundation of Korea (한국연구재단, NRF)
- National Research Institute of Cultural Heritage
- National Security Research Institute (국가보안기술연구소, NSR)
- Korea Institute of Ocean Science and Technology (선박해양플랜트연구소, KRISO)

=== Public enterprises ===
- Central Research Institute (중앙연구원), Korea Hydro & Nuclear Power
- Electric Power Research Institute (전력연구원), Korea Electric Power Corporation
- KEPCO Nuclear Fuel Headquarters
- Korea Minting and Security Printing Corporation Headquarters
- Land and Housing Research Institute (토지주택연구원), Korea Land and Housing Corporation
- Occupational Safety and Health Research Institute (산업안전보건연구원), Korea Occupational Safety and Health Agency
- Reactor Design Division (원자로설계사업본부), KEPCO E&C
- Research Institute of Water Resources (수자원연구원), Korea Water Resources Corporation

=== Private enterprise ===
- Daejeon Architectural Environment Research Center, DL E&C
- DL Chemical Daedeok R&D Center
- GS Caltex R&D Center
- Hanwha Aerospace Daejeon R&D Campus
- Hanwha Solutions Chemical Division Daejeon R&D Center
- Hankook Technodome(Central R&D Center)
- Korean Air Aerospace Division Daejeon R&D Center
- Korea Aerospace Industries Daejeon Research Center
- Korea Tobacco & Ginseng Corporation R&D Headquarters
- KT OSP Innovation Center
- Kumho Petrochemical Research Center
- LIG Nex1 Daejeon House(Daejeon R&D Center)
- LG Chem R&D Campus Daejeon
- LG Energy Solution R&D Campus Daejeon
- LG Household & Health Care Daejeon Research Institute
- LG Uplus Daejeon R&D Center
- Lotte Chemical R&D Center
- Merck Electronics Daejeon sit
- Merck Life Science Asia Pacific BioProcessing Center
- Samsung Heavy Industries Daeduk R&D Center
- Satrec Initiative Headquarters
- Institute of Technology Innovation, SK Innovation
- Institute of Battery Technology, SK On
- Taekwang Central Research Institute, Taekwang Industrial

=== University ===
- Chungnam National University (CNU)
- Korea Advanced Institute of Science and Technology (KAIST)
- Korea University of Science and Technology (UST)

== Other science and culture facilities ==
=== Museums ===
- Currency Museum of Korea, Daejeon
- Geological Museum (South Korea)
- National Science Museum

=== Parks ===
- Expo Science Park
