= Ryoo Ryong =

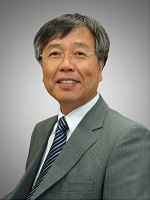
- Born: 1955 (age 70–71); Hwaseong, Gyeonggi, Republic of Korea
- Education: Seoul National University; Korea Advanced Institute of Science and Technology; Stanford University
- Known for: Porous materials, zeolite, carbon, catalysis
- Awards: Clarivate Citation Laureate (2014); Top Scientist and Technologist Award of Korea (2005); National Scientist of the Republic of Korea (2007); Ho-Am Prize in Science (2010); Breck Award by International Zeolite Association (2010)
- Scientific career
- Fields: Chemistry
- Workplaces: Korea Advanced Institute of Science and Technology, Institute for Basic Science
- Thesis: Platinum Clusters in Y-Zeolite – Studies by Physical and Chemical Probes
- Doctoral advisor: Michel Boudart

Korean name
- Hangul: 유룡
- Hanja: 劉龍
- RR: Yu Ryong
- MR: Yu Ryong
- Website: http://rryoo.kaist.ac.kr/

Ryoo Ryong FRSC (born 1955) is a distinguished professor of chemistry at KAIST in Daejeon, South Korea. He was the head of the Center for Nanomaterials and Chemical Reactions, an Extramural Research Center of the Institute for Basic Science. Ryoo has won a variety of awards, including the Top Scientist and Technologist Award of Korea given by the South Korean government in 2005. He obtained the KOSEF Science and Technology Award in 2001 for his work on the synthesis and crystal structure of mesoporous silica.

Ryoo obtained his bachelor's degree from Seoul National University in 1977, his master's from KAIST in 1979, and his doctorate from Stanford University in 1986. After completing his master's degree, he worked for three years at the Korean Atomic Energy Research Institute. After returning to Korea in 1986, he took a position with KAIST.

In 2006, Ryoo and his research team announced the discovery of a form of zeolite that can catalyze petrochemical reactions much more effectively than previous zeolites. Because of the potential of this to streamline the gasoline refining process, it was greeted as a "magical substance" by the South Korean press.

== Education ==
Ryoo graduated Suwon High School, then graduated with a bachelor's degree in applied chemistry from the Seoul National University. He received his PhD in chemistry from Stanford University in 1985 under the supervision of Prof. Michel Boudart. His PhD thesis is Platinum Clusters in Y-Zeolite – Studies by Physical and Chemical Probes. Prior to the PhD course, Ryoo worked at Korea Atomic Energy Research Institute as a researcher.

== Work ==
After obtaining his Ph.D. from Stanford University in 1986, Ryoo worked at Lawrence Berkeley Laboratory (U. C. Berkeley) as a Postdoctoral Fellow. He studied solid-state NMR under the supervision of Prof. Alex Pines (Jan. 1986 - Nov. 1986). Then he moved to the Department of Chemistry at KAIST as a professor (Dec. 1986).

During his research at KAIST, Ryoo laid scientific cornerstones on nanoporous carbon and hierarchically nanoporous zeolite materials science. He developed a hard-templating synthesis strategy toward nanoporous carbon material and its application to the research field of fuel cells. This synthesis strategy is being evaluated as a creative and innovative approach for synthesis of not only nanoporous carbon, but also other nanoporous materials such as zeolites, polymers and metal oxides.

In addition, Ryoo has been focusing on the synthesis of hierarchically nanoporous zeolite materials and their catalytic applications. In this work, he proposed several innovative synthesis strategies in porous materials preparation. He reported the organosilane-directed synthesis route to the mesoporous zeolites. Ryoo also released an article on the synthesis of single-unit-cell thick nanosheet zeolites. In this approach, a surfactant chemically incorporating a zeolite structure-directing head group was used, which can generate zeolite micropores as well as mesoporous structures simultaneously in a single synthesis step.

Ryoo received the Breck Award from the International Zeolite Association in 2010. In 2011, he extended the surfactant-directing synthesis strategy to various nanoporous structures such as hexagonal honeycomb and disordered nanosponge, rather than lamellar-type nanosheet, and reported these results in Science (2011). In 2007, Ryoo was named National Scientist of the Republic of Korea and has received research funds as part of the award. In addition, he became a distinguished professor in the Department of Chemistry at KAIST in 2008. He is a fellow of the Royal Society of Chemistry, and member of the Editorial Board for both Chemical Communications and ChemCatChem.

== Awards and honors ==
- Clarivate Citation Laureate (2014)
- Breck Award, International Zeolite Association (July 2010)
- Ho-Am Prize in Science, Ho-Am Foundation (2010)
- Creative Knowledge Awards, KISTI (Dec. 2009)
- Distinguished Professor, KAIST (2008)
- National Scientist of the Republic of Korea, Ministry of Education, Science and Technology, Korea (Nov. 2007)
- Leading Scientist in a Research Front, Thomson Scientific and Korea Science and Engineering Foundation (May 2007)
- Model Scientist for Young People, Korea Science Foundation (Aug. 2006)
- Top Scientist and Technologist Award of Korea, Korean Federation of Science and Technology Societies (ko) (April 2005)
- Grand Academic Award, KAIST (Dec. 2002)
- Academic Award, Korean Chemical Society (April 2002)
- Professor of the Year, KAIST (Dec. 2001)
- Scientist of the Month, Ministry of Science and ICT and National Research Foundation of Korea (Aug. 2001)
- Best Paper Award, Japan Society of Electron Microscopy (with Prof. O. Terasaki May 2001)
- Research of Future Award, ACS Symposium on Nanotechnology in Catalysis (April 2001)
- Best Paper Award, Korean Federation of Science and Technology Societies (April 2001)
- Best Paper Award, Korean Chemical Society (April 2000)

== Highlight papers ==
Ryoo, R., et al. “Rare-earth–platinum alloy nanoparticles in mesoporous zeolite for catalysis”, Nature, 2020.
Kim, K., et al. “Lanthanum-catalysed synthesis of microporous 3D graphene-like carbons in a zeolite template”, Nature, 2016.
Na, K., et al. “Directing Zeolite Structures into Hierarchically Nanoporous Architectures”, Science, 2011.
Choi, M., et al. “Stable single-unit-cell nanosheets of zeolite MFI as active and long-lived catalysts”, Nature, 2009.
Choi, M., et al. “Amphiphilic organosilane-directed synthesis of crystalline zeolite with tunable mesoporosity”, Nature Materials, 2006.
Choi, M., et al. “Ordered nanoporous polymer-carbon composites”, Nature Materials, 2003.
Joo, S. H., et al. “Ordered nanoporous arrays of carbon supporting high dispersions of platinum nanoparticles”, Nature, 2001.
Sakamoto, Y., et al. “Direct imaging of the pores and cages of three-dimensional mesoporous materials”, Nature, 2000.

== See also ==
- Park Jeong Young
- Gábor A. Somorjai
