= University of Science and Technology, Korea =

University in South Korea

University of Science and Technology
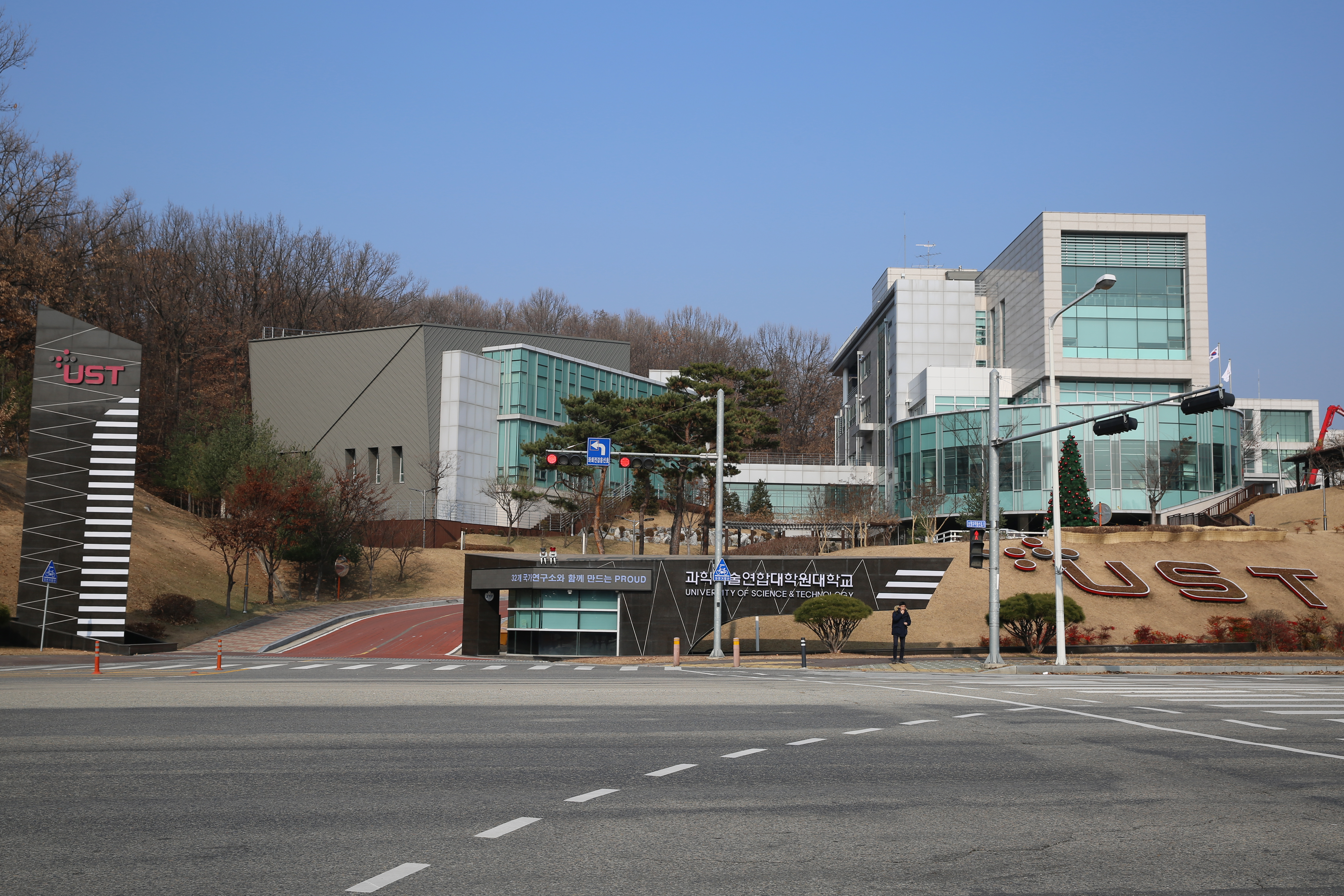
- Type: National
- Established: 2003
- President: DaeIm KANG
- Students: 1,692 (March 2026)
- Location: 176 Gajeong-dong [217 Gajeongro], Yuseong-gu, Daejeon, 34113, Korea, Daejeon, Seoul et al., South Korea
- Campus: Multiple Sites (Daejeon etc)
- Mascot: Pegasus
- Website: www.ust.ac.kr

Korean name
- Hangul: 과학기술연합대학원대학교
- Hanja: 科學技術聯合大學院大學校
- RR: Gwahak gisul yeonhap daehagwon daehakgyo
- MR: Kwahak kisul yŏnhap taehagwŏn taehakkyo

University of Science and Technology (Korean: 과학기술연합대학원대학교; UST) is a group of public research institutions in Seoul, Busan, Changwon, Ansan, Seongnam and Daejeon, etc, in South Korea. UST is the leading government-funded research university dedicated to the synergistic effects of research and education in Science and Technology. The UST was established in 2003 by the Ministry of Science and ICT as the nation’s graduate school specializing in science and engineering education and research. The UST runs only a graduate school. Creating the new driving force for growth would play a major role in leading national growth in the new century. The South Korean government established the UST to produce professionals in the field of combined technologies, thought of as one of the most important criteria for creating the driving force for South Korea's national growth. Today, UST continues to develop itself into a major research university.

== Education advantages ==
UST established courses that allow students to build experience in research fields. Lab rotation is an example. UST encourages students to get hands-on experience by actively participating in the research by awarding credits as well as minimizing classroom lectures. UST provides opportunities to participate in projects conducted by other institutions or private companies. UST also adopted Lab rotation programs which enable students to gain relevant experience in various research fields. Students take liberal arts classes as prerequisite so they can be well-grounded as leaders in their given research field, and provide them with insight into society in general.

=== Salary ===
- Student researchers, depending on the campus, not only receive insurance benefits but also a monthly stipend.
- Those in master's programs earn at least 1,430,000 South Korean Won per month.
- Those in Ph.D. programs earn at least 1,900,000 South Korean Won per month.

The amounts mentioned are pre-tax figures, and while it varies from campus to campus, some also provide severance pay.

== Special courses ==
The universities offer special courses in technical business administration, technical economics, technical strategies, theories of research, planning, and management, venture start-ups, technical communication, technical writing, etc.

== UST presidents ==
- Chung Myung Sai (November 2003–October 2007)
- Lee Se Kyung (October 2007–October 2011)
- Lee Un Woo (December 2011–December 2015)
- Moon Kil-Choo (January 2016–January 2020)
- Kim Iee-Hwan (January 2020–January 2025)
- KANG DaeIm (January 2025–current)

== Majors ==
UST is a graduate program in science and technology taught in English run as a consortium by the advanced research institutes in Daejeon and throughout South Korea.

=== School of Science ===
- Science of Measurement
- Bio-molecular Science
- Bio-Analytical Science
- Functional Genomics
- Nano Surface Technology
- Green Chemistry and Environmental Biotechnology
- Polar Science
- Nuclear Fusion
- Astronomy and Space Science
- Radiological Cancer Medicine
- Medical Physics
- Marine Environmental System Science
- Neuroscience
- Technology Management and Policy

=== School of Engineering ===
- Broadband Network Technology
- Information Security Engineering
- Mobile Communication & Digital Broadcasting Engineering
- Computer Software & Engineering
- E-BIZ Management
- Electronic Counter Counter-Measure Communications Technology
- ITS Engineering
- Underwater Acoustic Communications
- Information Network for Transportation Engineering
- Information Science & Technology
- Manufacturing System Engineering
- Grid and Supercomputing
- HCI & Robotics
- Geoinformatic Engineering
- Electrical Equipment Information and Communications Engineering
- Advanced Device Technology
- Intelligent Robot Engineering
- Biopotency/Toxicology Evaluation
- Nanobiotechnology
- Food Biotechnology
- Korea Traditional Medicine and Biotechnology
- Nanomaterials Science and Engineering
- Electrical Functionality Material Engineering
- Nano-Electronics
- Micro Nano System Engineering
- Nano-Mechatronics
- Accelerator and Beam Nano Engineering
- Civil and Environmental Engineering (Water Resources and Environmental Engineering)
- Resources Recycling
- Environmental System Engineering
- Future Modern Traffic System Engineering
- Energy and Power Conversion Engineering
- Advanced Energy Technology
- Energy System Engineering
- Green Process and System Engineering
- Measurement and Detection of Radiation
- Laser and Plasma Engineering
- Advanced Nuclear System Engineering
- Quantum Energy Chemical Engineering
- Petroleum Resources Technology
- Aircraft System Engineering
- Space Launch Vehicle System Engineering
- Accurately Guided Vehicle System Engineering
- Satellite Systems and Applications Engineering

== Schools ==
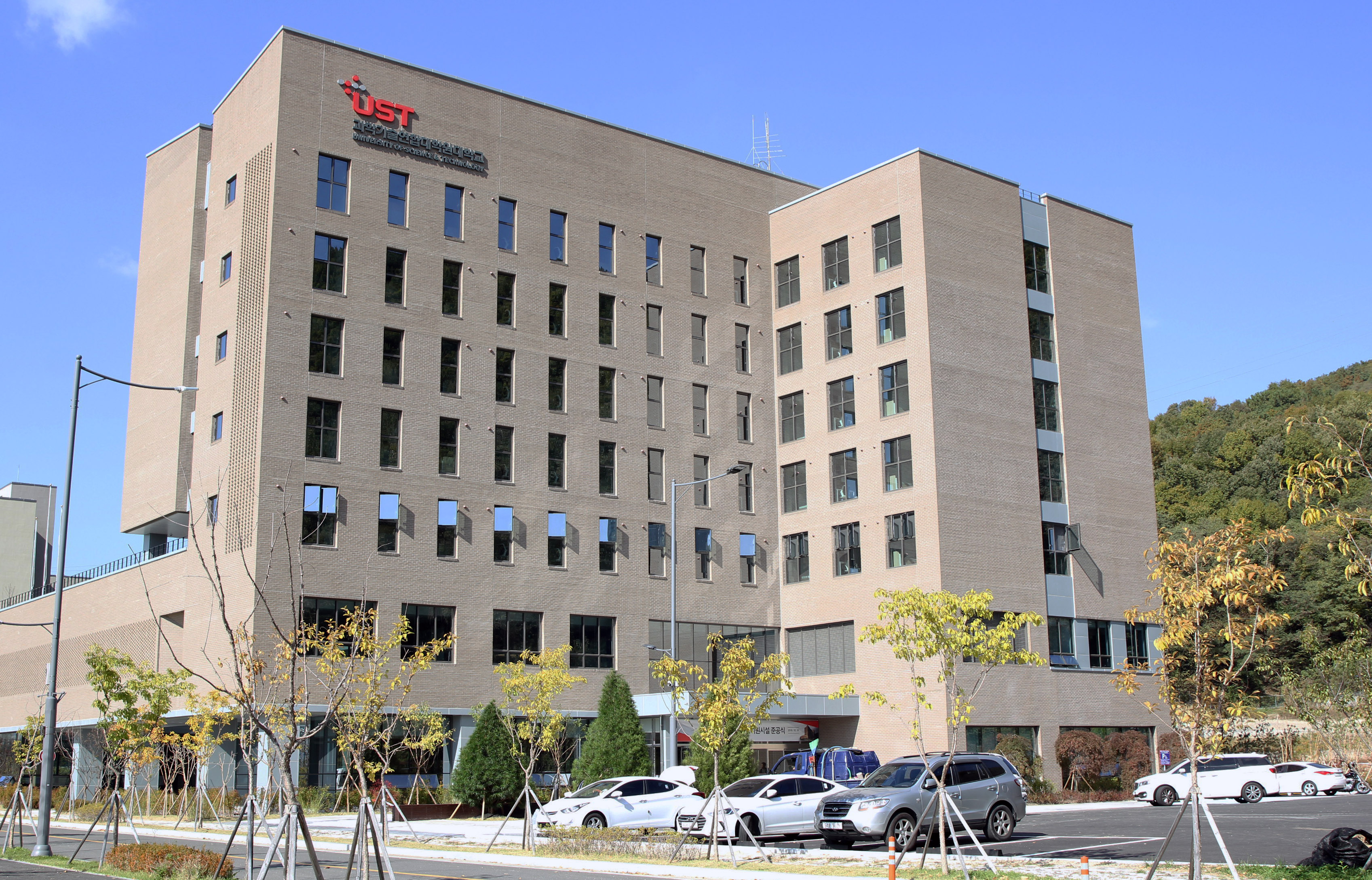
UST Dormitory at the Institute for Basic Science in Daejeon

UST has headquarters and following research institutions as schools.

- Korea Institute of Civil Engineering and Building Technology (KICT)
- Korea Institute of Industrial Technology (KITECH)
- Korea Institute of Science and Technology (KIST)
- Electronics and Telecommunications Research Institute (ETRI)
- Korea Electrotechnology Research Institute (KERI)
- Korea Aerospace Research Institute (KARI)
- Korea Atomic Energy Research Institute (KAERI)
- Korea Basic Science Institute (KBSI)
- Institute for Basic Science (IBS)
- Korea Astronomy and Space Science Institute (KASI)
- Korea Research Institute of Bioscience & Biotechnology (KRIBB)
- Korea Institute of Oriental Medicine (KIOM)
- Korea Institute of Ocean Science and Technology (KIOST)
- Korea Research Institute of Chemical Technology (KRICT)
- Korea Institute of Machinery & Material (KIMM)
- Korea Institute of Science and Technology Information (KISTI)
- Korea Research Institute of Standards and Science (KRISS)
- Korea Institute of Geoscience & Mineral Resources (KIGAM)
- Korea Institute of Energy Research (KIER)
- Korea Institute of Nuclear Safety (KINS)
- Korea Railroad Research Institute (KRRI)

== Achievements and vision ==
Since foundation 2004, UST has been the most qualified research institution in Korea and globally as well. There were 118 Ph.D. and 321 M.S students who came from 28 countries have graduated. The number of SCI-grade theses per student until graduation is 5.44, the highest profile amongst Korean universities. In 2010, UST was followed Seoul National University as the country's second university in the number of published SCI journals (Science Citation Index).

UST is expected to be the main institution that extensively accelerates Korea's scientific research by facing the Nobel Prize Challenge.

=== Graduates' research achievements ===
* 4.52 papers published with SCI level of journals per doctoral graduate

- 1.12 case of patent applied and registered per doctoral graduate

=== Research projects that were selected as 100 Excellent National Research and Development Projects ===
- 12 research projects conducted by UST faculty members and students were selected as 100 Excellent National Research and Development Projects, 2010 by the Ministry of Education, Science, and Technology.

Affiliation	UST	Seoul National University	POSTECH	GIST	KAIST
Projects	12	5	5	4	1

== Rankings ==
Korea National University of Science and Technology, UST has been ranked highly amongst global universities by the Center for World University Rankings (CWUR), placed 183rd in the world in 2018. In national rank, Korea National University of Science and Technology Placed 2nd in South Korea.

== Admission ==
The admissions deadline is usually around start of May and September each year. Like most of Korean universities, the students are required to first get professor approval before formally applying for the admission. The admission is quite competitive but the selective students are given opportunity to work on some of the latest R&D done in Korea.

== See also ==
- EveR-1
- List of national universities in South Korea
- List of colleges and universities in South Korea
- Education in South Korea
