= Yuseong District =

Coordinates: 36.362°N 127.356°E

Yuseong
- Autonomous District
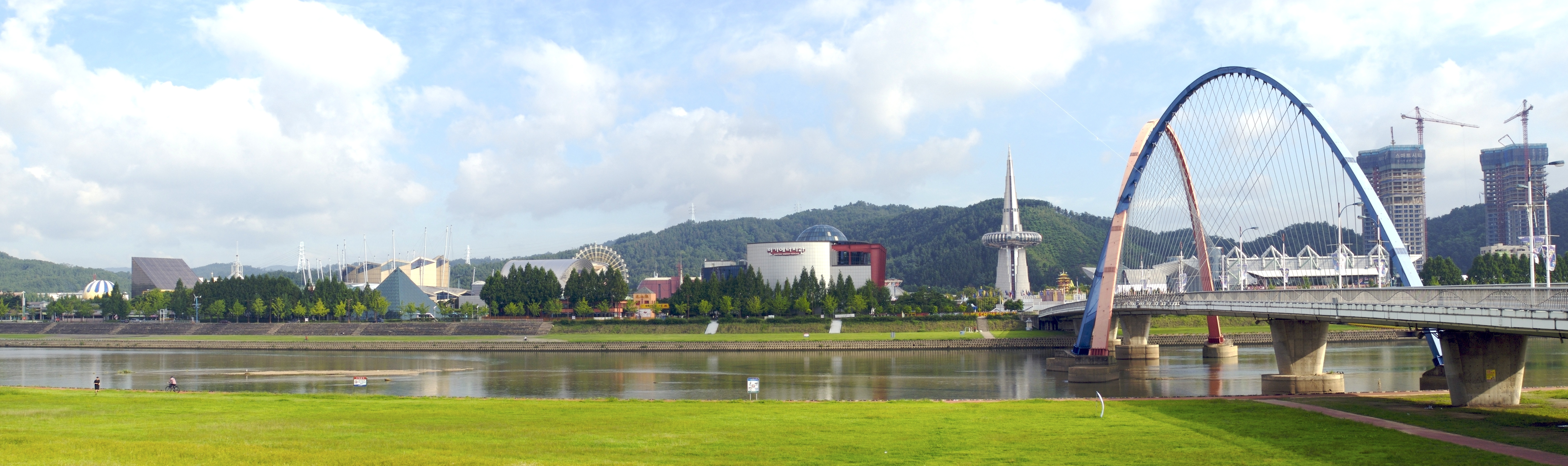
- Expo Science Park Street view of a residential and commercial area in Gwanpyeong-dong (2015)

- Flag

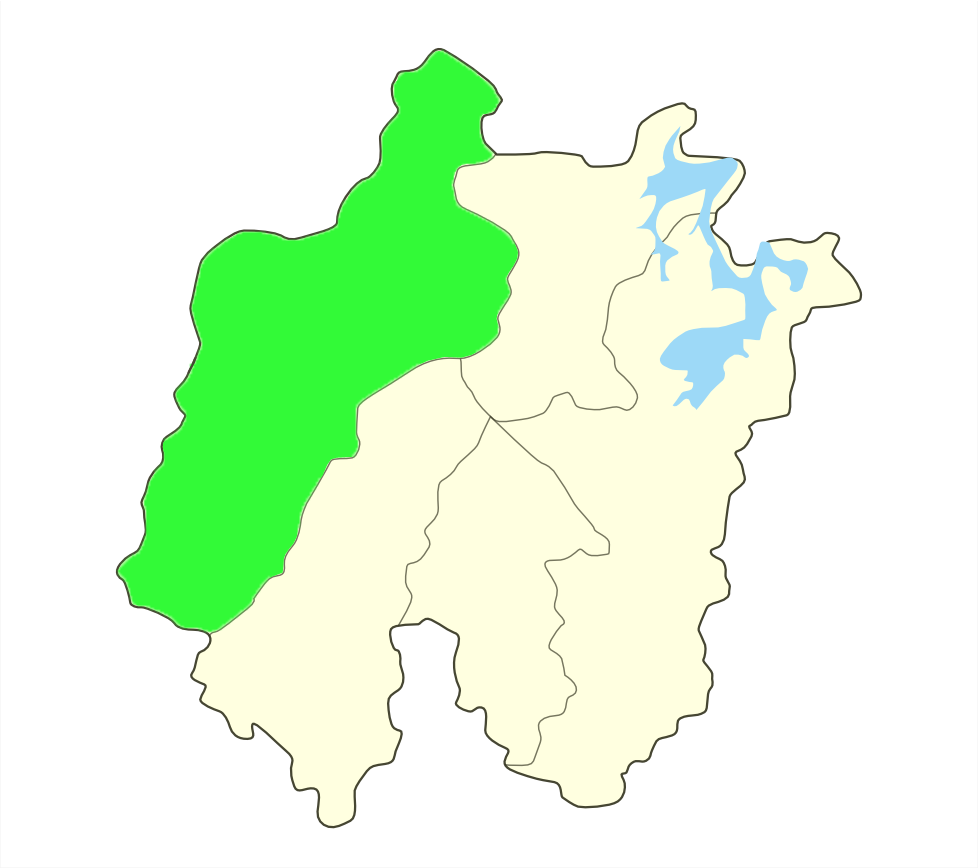
- Country: South Korea
- Region: Hoseo
- Provincial level: Daejeon
- Administrative divisions: 11 administrative dong

Area
  - Total: 176.46 km^{2} (68.13 sq mi)

Population (September 2024)
  - Total: 369,405
  - Density: 2,093.4/km^{2} (5,421.9/sq mi)
  - Dialect: Chungcheong
- Website: Yuseong District Office

Korean name
- Hangul: 유성구
- Hanja: 儒城區
- RR: Yuseong-gu
- MR: Yusŏng-gu

Yuseong District (Korean: 유성구) is a gu ("district") of Daejeon, South Korea, known for high tech industries, Daejeon Expo '93, Daedeok Science Town and the Yuseong Special Tourism District. Daejeon Islamic Center is also located in Kung-dong, Yuseong District. The Science Town is the core of the International Science and Business Belt.

== History ==
Yuseong first started its spa business in 1913, and by the 1970s, major developments were made, adding 12 more hotels to the area, leading this area to be designated first as the Special Spa District in 1981 and finally as the Yuseong Special Tourism District by August 31, 1994.

== Tourism and technology ==
Since the time of the Baekje Kingdom, travellers have visited Yuseong's natural springs and spas. This ultimately resulted in the creation of the Yuseong Special Tourism District. The majority of the hotels in Daejeon are situated in this area, and it is one of the commercial centers of Daejeon. Some important sight seeing places are the Daejeon National Cemetery, Geological Museum, Currency Museum of Korea, Natural History Museum, Daejeon Prehistory Museum, Asia Museum, Yeojin Gallery, and Daejeon Museum of Art. Science-oriented attractions include National Science Museum, Daejeon Space Observatory, Daedeok Science Town, and Daejeon Institute of Education & Science.

Parks include Expo Science Park and Kumdori Land. Cultural centers include Mokwon University Daedeok Science Culture Center, Jeongsimhwa International Culture Center, Expo Art Hall, Suwungyo Cheondan, Ahnsansanseong (Fortress), Jimjam Confucian School, and Ssunghyeon Ancient Lecture Hall.

Daejeon Shinsegae Art & Science, a large complex shopping center, opened in 2021. It is located in Doryong-dong.

== Neighborhoods (Dong) of Yuseong ==
- Jinjam-dong
  - Seongbuk-dong
  - Se-dong
  - Songjeong-dong
  - Wonnae-dong
  - Bang-dong
  - Gyochon-dong
  - Daejeong-dong
  - Yonggye-dong
  - Hakha-dong
  - Gyesan-dong
- Wonsinheung-dong
  - Wonsinheung-dong
  - Sangdae-dong
  - Bongmyeong-dong(Partly)
- Oncheon 1-dong
  - Bongmyeong-dong(Partly)
  - Guam-dong
  - Deogmyeong-dong
  - Bongnyong-dong
- Oncheon 2-dong
  - Jangdae-dong(Partly)
  - Juk-dong(Partly)
  - Gung-dong
  - Eoeun-dong
  - Guseong-dong
  - Noeun-dong(Partly)
- Noeun 1-dong
  - Gap-dong
  - Noeun-dong(Partly)
  - Jijok-dong(Partly)
  - Juk-dong(Partly)
  - Jangdae-dong(Partly)
- Noeun 2-dong
  - Hagi-dong(Partly)
  - Sunam-dong
  - Ansan-dong
  - Oesam-dong
  - Banseok-dong(Partly)
  - Juk-dong(Partly)
  - Jijok-dong(Partly)
- Noeun 3-dong
  - Jijok-dong(Partly)
  - Banseok-dong(Partly)
- Sinseong-dong
- Jeonmin-dong
- Gujeuk-dong
- Gwanpyeong-dong

== Plans ==
Plans have been made to renovate and develop the areas to attract more tourists. The major project that is currently proposed and evaluated is the Yuseong Leisure Town. Water theme parks, spa resorts, public golf course, and various other attractions will be constructed.

== Science ==
Daedeok Science Park in Yuseong District is Korea's top research area, hosting multiple public and private research groups and organizations. Government funded research groups include the following.

- Agency for Defense Development
- Central Research Institute (중앙연구원), Korea Hydro & Nuclear Power
- Central Branch Office (중부분소), National Forensic Service
- Electronics and Telecommunications Research Institute
- Institute for Basic Science
- International Intellectual Property Training Institute
- KAIST
- KEPCO Research Institute, Korea Electric Power Corporation
- Korea Aerospace Research Institute
- Korea Astronomy and Space Science Institute
- Korea Atomic Energy Research Institute
- Korea Basic Science Institute
- Korea Evaluation Institute of Industrial Technology
- Korea Institute of Energy Research
- Korea Institute of Geoscience and Mineral Resources
- Korea Institute of Machinery & Materials
- Korea Institute of Nuclear Nonproliferation and Control
- Korea Institute of Nuclear Safety
- Korea Institute of Oriental Medicine
- Korea Institute of R&D Human Resource Development
- Korea Institute of Science and Technology Information
- Korea Research Institute of Bioscience and Biotechnology
- Korea Research Institute of Chemical Technology
- Korea Research Institute of Standards and Science
- National Fusion Research Institute
- National Institute for Mathematical Sciences
- National NanoFab Center
- National Research Foundation of Korea
- National Research Institute of Cultural Heritage
- National Security Research Institute
- National Urban Research Institute (국토도시연구원), Korea Land and Housing Corporation
- Research Institute of Water Resources (수자원연구원), K-water
- Ship & Offshore Plant Research Institute (선박해양플랜트연구소), Korea Institute of Ocean Science & Technology
