= Walter Kofler =

Austrian physician and philosopher of medicine

Walter Kofler (born May 27, 1945, Tyrol, Austria) is an Austrian physician and philosopher of medicine. Until 2010 he was professor at the Innsbruck Medical University and teaches since 2012 at the I.M. Sechenov First Moscow State Medical University. He is President of the International Academy of Science, Munich.

== Life ==
Kofler is an internationally recognized scientist for environmental medicine, air pollution and an international expert for environmental protection. He published 182 scientific articles and 14 books. Starting 1970 he was one of the pioneers of the environmental movement in Austria and Europe, for decades he was board (vice-president) of the largest environmental umbrella organization (Umweltdachverband) of Austria (39 organizations with 1.4 million members). Kofler made significant discoveries (e.g. principle of toxicopy) and applications such as the First Environmental Impact Assessment in Europe.

Walter Kofler studied medicine at the University of Innsbruck, received a doctorate in medicine and made his habilitation 1976 for the subject of hygiene. Kofler taught or researched at Harvard University, Massachusetts; NIOSH, Cincinnati, Ohio; University of Kyoto, Japan; Moscow University of Humanities; School of Public Health, University of São Paulo; and the Technical University of Munich. He was director of the Section Social Medicine - School of Public Health at the Department of Hygiene, Microbiology and Social Medicine, Medical University of Innsbruck.

He is elected member in different academies, 2005 he was elected as foreign member into the Russian Academy of Medical Sciences.

His current research interests are public health research: complex understanding of the effects of traffic-related environmental impacts on health, illness and recovery needs and suggestibility; science: Extended view model for a theory of health of a person as a social being. Concern for the "Convergence Project" to reconcile the various scientific and non-scientific empirical sciences - as a basis for the derivability of health-related statements.

== Awards ==
This is a partial list. See for more.

- 1988: Member of the International Academy of Science, Munich, Germany
- 2001: Medal for Services to Science and Culture, Brazil
- 2004: Thomas Kuhn-Hope for the Future for a Sustainable and Health oriented World
- 2005: Member of the Russian Academy of Medical Sciences
- 2005: Member of Russian Academy of Natural Sciences
- 2011: Order of the White Elephant
- 2014: Foreign Member of the Russian Academy of Science

== Memberships ==
this is a partial list. See for more.

- Vice President of the Austrian Nature Conservation League, 1971-2011.
- Vice President of the Austrian Environmental Umbrella Organization(Umweltdachverband), since 1973.
- Senator Academia Alpina Medicinae Integralis, Breganzona CH, since 1992.
- President of Austrian Society for Air and Soil Protection, 1992 - 2007.
- Austrian Member of International Board of the International Union of Air Pollution Prevention and Environmental Protection Associations (IUAPPA) since 1992.

== Selection of publications ==
- Kofler WW. Toxicopy - A basic mechanism to cope with environmental threats. Zbl Bakt Hyg 1988, B 185: 479.
- "200 Maßnahmen für ein Nachhaltiges Österreich" – Das Arbeitsprogramm der Österreichischen Nachhaltigkeitsstrategie der Bundesregierung: Arbeitsprogramm für 2002 und 2004
- Gary W. Evans, Peter Lercher, Markus Meis, Hartmut Ising4 and Walter W. Kofler: Community noise exposure and stress in children.J. Acoust. Soc. Am. 109, 1023 (2001)
- Kofler W., Ishfag Ahmad, Makhmud Kherimov, E. Khalilov (eds.): Proceedings Natural Cataclysms and global problems of the modern civilisation, International Symposium, Baku 24 – 27. 9. 2007, 760p
- Leung P-C, J Woo, W Kofler: Health, Wellbeing, Competence and Aging, Annales of Traditional Chinese Med, Vol 6, World Scientific, NJ, London, Singapore, Beijing, Shanghai, Hong Kong, Taipei, Chennai, 224p, 2013
- Kofler W: Philosophy for fundamental science and applied medicine, englisch/russisch, Fundamental Science and Clinical Medicine – Homo and Health, SPbSU Publ ISSN 2221-5654
