= KNF =

KNF may refer to

- Kuroda normal form, a normal form for context-sensitive grammars
- Korea Nuclear Fuel, a South Korean company
- Korean natural farming, developed by Cho Han Kyu
- IATA airport code for RAF Marham
- Komisja Nadzoru Finansowego, the Polish Financial Supervisory Commission
- The Koshland-Némethy-Filmer sequential model, a theory of the cooperativity of protein subunits
- Kuki National Front, a militant organisation operating in the state of Manipur, India
- Kuki-Chin National Front, a banned separatist organisation in Bangladesh
