= Kuk Young =

South Korean physicist (born 1953)

- 국양
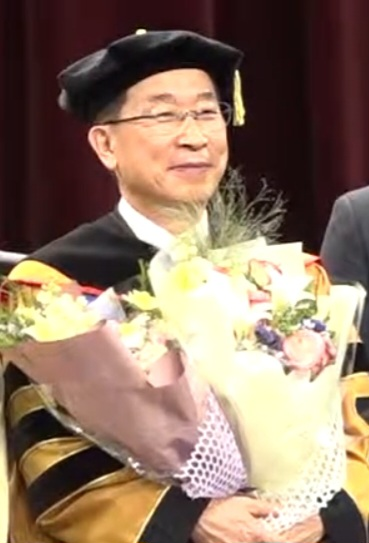
- Born: 1953 (age 72–73); Seoul, Korea
- Education: Kyunggi High School, Seoul National University, Pennsylvania State University
- Awards: Fellow, IEEE and APS
- Scientific career
- Fields: Condensed matter physics, nanometer scale physics, scanning probe microscopy, high energy ion scattering
- Workplaces: AT&T Bell Laboratories, Seoul National University, National Science and Technology Commission, Samsung Science and Technology Foundation, Ewha Womans University, Center for Quantum Nanoscience, Daegu Gyeongbuk Institute of Science and Technology
- Thesis: Study of Metal and Alloy Surfaces by Field Ion Microscopy
- Doctoral advisor: Toshio Sakurai
- Notable students: Park Jeong Young

Korean name
- Hangul: 국양
- Hanja: 鞠樑
- RR: Guk Yang
- MR: Kuk Yang
- Website: DGIST

Kuk Young (Korean: 국양; born 1953) is a South Korean physicist, former physics professor and vice-provost of research of Seoul National University, distinguished professor of Ewha Womans University, and chairman of the Samsung Science and Technology Foundation. He is a fellow of the American Physical Society, Korean Academy of Science and Technology, Institute of Physics, Korean Physical Society, and Korean Vacuum Society. He has performed editor roles for the journals Nanotechnology, ACS Nano, and Solid State Electronics and was the fourth president of Daegu Gyeongbuk Institute of Science and Technology (DGIST). He is best known for his work in the area of surface science and physics in nanometer scale. His interests include geometric and electronic structures of molecular, one-dimensional and surface structures.

== Education ==
Kuk graduated from Kyunggi High School in 1971 and then went to Seoul National University, where he majored in physics and graduated with a B.S. and M.S. in 1975 and 1978, respectively. Continuing with a physics major, he graduated from Pennsylvania State University in 1981 with a Ph.D.

== Career ==
With doctorate in hand, Young became a member of the technical staff at AT&T Bell Laboratories; a position he continued for a decade. Returning to Korea in 1991, he became a professor of physics and astronomy at Seoul National University (SNU) for the next 27 years. Between March 2002 and December 2004, he was a special committee member for nanoscience within the National Science and Technology Commission. For two years, he was vice-provost for research in the Office of Research Affairs of SNU, at the end of which he also became a fellow of the Korean Academy of Science and Technology. For five years he was the chairman of the Samsung Science and Technology Foundation, only ending the position upon becoming president of Daegu Gyeongbuk Institute of Science and Technology.

In April 2018, he became a distinguished professor at Ewha Womans University, Center for Quantum Nanoscience. His team at Ewha studied quantum materials, specifically two-dimensional superconductors in nanometer scale. He left all positions and responsibilities in March 2019 in order to head the Daegu Gyeongbuk Institute of Science and Technology in April 2019 till November 2023. He is a professor emeritus in Seoul National University and the chairman of the Samsung Science and Technology Foundation.

== Awards ==
- 2008: Inchon Award
- 2006: National Scholar, Ministry of Education & Human Resources Development
- 2004: National Academy of Sciences Award, Korea
- 2004: 10 Popular Scientists, The Dong-A Ilbo, Korea
- 2002: Scientist of the Year in Nano, Korean Ministry of Science and Technology
- 1980: E. W. Müller Outstanding Emerging Scientist Award, IFES American Vacuum Society Graduate Student Award

== See also ==
- Shin Sung-chul, 1st and 2nd president of DGIST University
