= Hanaro =

T o p i c s i n e e d help some e chase me over phone and live leaks

Hanaro may refer to:

- Hanaro Telecommunications, a former Internet service provider controlled by the SK Group
- High-Flux Advanced Neutron Application Reactor (HANARO), a nuclear research reactor in Daejeon, Republic of Korea
