= Kwang Hwa Chung =

South Korean physicist (born 1948)

Kwang Hwa Chung (Korean: 정광화; Hanja: 鄭光和, born 1948) is a South Korean physicist who has served as president of the Korea Research Institute of Standards and Science, the Korea Basic Science Institute, and the Korean Vacuum Society. She has received the Moran Medal of the Order of Civil Merit, as well as other honors and awards for her scientific research and work to promote professionalism for women in STEM fields.

== Early life and education ==
After graduating from Gyeonggi Girls' High School in 1966, Chung studied physics at Seoul National University, completing her undergraduate studies in 1970. Continuing her education, she earned a PhD in the field of particle physics from the University of Pittsburgh in Pennsylvania in 1977. Her dissertation was titled, Chiral calculations of the phase shifts for the π, K system. While in Pittsburgh, she married her classmate, Kyungsoo Jeong (Korean: 정경수), a fellow physicist who would go on to work researching missiles at the Defense Science Research Institute in Seoul.

== Career ==
In 1978, Chung began researching at the Korea Standards Research Institute, later the Korea Research Institute of Standards and Science, the first woman to work as a doctoral researcher at the institute. For a decade, she would be one of only two women scientists working there. Her specialty is in vacuum measurements. She was appointed the head of the mass standard laboratory and later of the pressure and vacuum laboratory. She has recorded domestic patents for numerous devices, including a plasma electron density measurement and monitor, as well as overseas patents, including a gas flow velocity distribution analyzer and is recognized as an expert in measurement standards.

In 1993, Chung became one of the founders of the first organization to support women in science and technology, the Association of Korean Woman Scientists and Engineers. She served as the organization's third and fourth president (2000–2004), following the two terms of Se-hwa Oh (Korean: 오세화), a professor at the Kyung Hee University and fellow researcher at the Standards Institute. Two years later they founded a daycare center for the Daedeok Innopolis to help working women with balancing their work and home obligations. During her years as president of the association, Chung pressed for legislation to encourage the participation of women in Science, technology, engineering, and mathematics disciplines. In 2002, the Act on Fostering and Supporting Women Scientists and Engineers passed the legislature and at the end of the year, she was awarded the Science and Technology Grand Prize by the National Assembly for her work to create the law.

In 2000, Chung was honored with the Moran Medal of the Order of Civil Merit and received the Scientist of the Month award in October 2004 for developing evaluation technology for vacuum characteristics. In 2005, she became the first woman to serve as president of the Korea Research Institute of Standards and Science, and served a three-year term. In 2008, she was chosen by the Korea Science Foundation and the Ministry of Education, Science and Technology as the Woman Scientist/Engineer of the Year Award and was elected to membership in the International Committee for Weights and Measures (French: Comité international des poids et mesures, CIPM) headquartered in France. From 2009 to 2013, she was president of the Graduate School of Analytical Science and Technology of Chungnam National University and was elected to serve a 3-year term as president of the Korea Basic Science Institute in 2013.

== Selected works ==
- Chung, Kwang-Hwa (August 2002). "The Current Status of Korean Women Scientists and Affirmative Actions by the Korean Government". AIP Conference Proceedings. 628 (1). College Park, Maryland: American Institute of Physics: 187. Bibcode:2002AIPC..628..187C. doi:10.1063/1.1505325. ISSN 0094-243X.
- Chung, Kwang Hwa; Kim, J. S.; Kim, J. S.; Kim, Young Jin (March 2004). "Three-Dimensional Elastic-Plastic Finite Element Analysis of Biaxially Loaded Cracked Plates". Key Engineering Materials. 261–263. Aedermannsdorf, Switzerland: Trans Tech Publications Ltd.: 699–704. ISSN 1013-9826. OCLC 8590087566.
- Chung, Kwang Hwa; Yang, Won Ho; Cho, Myoung Rae (April 2004). "Fracture Mechanics Analysis of Cracked Plate Repaired by Composite Patch". Key Engineering Materials. 183–187. Aedermannsdorf, Switzerland: Trans Tech Publications Ltd.: 43–48. ISSN 1013-9826. OCLC 4660680005.
- Chung, Kwang-Hwa (December 2004). "Ion Species and Electron Behavior in Capacitively Coupled Ar and O2 Plasma". Journal of Applied Physics. 96 (11). College Park, Maryland: American Institute of Physics: 6039–6044. Bibcode:2004JAP....96.6039S. doi:10.1063/1.1809253. ISSN 0021-8979. OCLC 4433126939.
- Chung, Kwang Hwa, ed. (2005). On the Convergence of Bio-, Information-, Environmental-, Energy-, Space- and Nano-Technologies. Uetikon-Zuerich, Switzerland: Trans Tech Publications. ISBN 978-0-87849-958-8.
- Chung, Kwang Hwa; Cho, Mi Young; Sung, Moon-Hee; Poo, Haryoung; Lim, Yong Taik (2011). "Electrostatically Assembled Biocompatible Polymer Nanoparticles for MR/Optical Dual-Modality Imaging Nanoprobes". Chemical Communications. 47 (31). London: Royal Society of Chemistry: 8889–91. doi:10.1039/c1cc11922b. ISSN 1359-7345. OCLC 742594576. PMID 21748163.
