= Park Jeong Young =

South Korean chemist

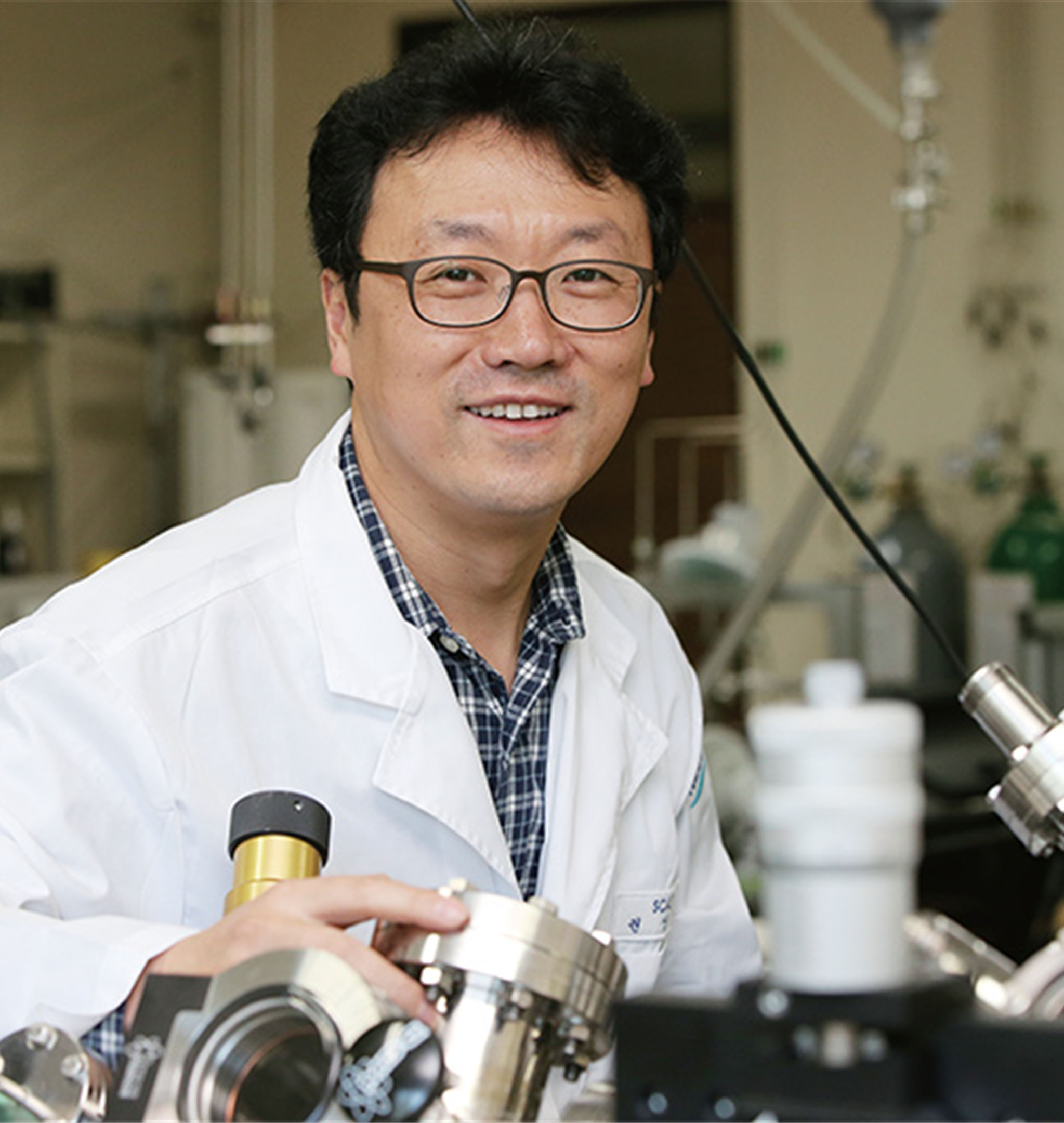
- Citizenship: South Korean
- Education: Seoul National University
- Known for: Surface chemistry, hot electron chemistry and catalytronics
- Scientific career
- Fields: Surface chemistry, nanocatalysis, hot electron, scanning probe microscopy
- Workplaces: KAIST, IBS (Institute for Basic Science), Lawrence Berkeley National Laboratory, University of Maryland, College Park
- Theses: STM을 이용한 Field Emission Microcolumn System의 개발 (1995); Study of Surface and Film Structures with Scanning Tunneling Microscopy Aligned Projection Electron Beam System (1998)
- Doctoral advisor: Kuk Young

Korean name
- Hangul: 박정영
- Hanja: 朴正英
- RR: Bak Jeongyeong
- MR: Pak Chŏngyŏng
- Website: SCALE

Park Jeong Young (Korean: 박정영), sometimes written as Park, Jeong Y., is a professor in the Department of Chemistry at KAIST and associate director at the Center for Nanomaterials and Chemical Reactions at the Institute for Basic Science. He is a member of the American Chemical Society and American Vacuum Society among others, an international committee member of Asian Science Camp, and has served on the editorial boards of Scientific Reports, Advanced Materials Interfaces, Journal of the Korean Physical Society, and New Physics.

== Education ==
Park majored in physics at Seoul National University, where he received his B.S., M.S., and Ph.D. in 1993, 1995, and 1999, respectively.

== Career ==
Park became a postdoctoral research associate in the Department of Physics of University of Maryland, College Park. In 2002, he worked as a physicist postdoctoral fellow in the Materials Sciences Division of the Lawrence Berkeley National Laboratory and then as a staff scientist from 2006. Returning to Korea, he taught and conducted research at KAIST as an associate professor in the Graduate School of EEWS in 2009 before becoming a full professor in the Department of Chemistry in 2017. While researching at KAIST, he joined the Institute for Basic Science (IBS) Center for Nanomaterials and Chemical Reaction as a group leader in 2013 and then became associate director in 2016. A collaboration between KAIST's Department of Chemistry and IBS, Park conducts research at Surface science and Catalysis with Atomic Level Engineering Laboratory, also known as SCALE Lab.

== Research ==
There are four primary research topics at SCALE Lab; surface chemistry, nanocatalysis, hot electron, and scanning probe microscopy.

=== Surface chemistry ===
Research goals are to discover fundamental principles behind the formation of nanostructures to allow synthesis. Materials include single crystals, oxide–metal interfaces, nanoparticles, and solid–liquid interfaces.

=== Nanocatalysis ===
As the size, shape, and composition of nanoparticles affects catalytic activity, the lab synthesizesg multi-functional nanoparticles of different sizes, including yolk–shell, core–shell, and hybrid nanocatalysts with various surface-sensitive techniques.

=== Hot electron ===
Electronic excitation created during molecular or atomic processes at the surface has been utilized to demonstrate analogous photocurrent process and potential application in solar energy conversion technologies. The lab has worked on ways to improve the conversion efficiency.

=== Scanning probe microscopy ===
Reaction intermediates and surface mobility under catalytic reaction conditions is detectable using surface science techniques. Atomic force microscopy has permitted the investigation of nanomechanical, structural properties, and charge transport.

== Memberships ==
- 2022–present: Korean Academy of Science and Technology
- 2010–present: Korean Physical Society
- 2011–present: Korean Vacuum Society
- 2005–present: American Chemistry Society
- 2001–present: Material Research Society
- 1996–present: American Vacuum Society
- 1995–present: American Physical Society

== Awards ==
- 2016: KAIST Top 10 Research Achievements
- 2012: Top Government R&D Achievement Award, National Science and Technology Commission
- 2012: Top 50 Basic Research Achievement Award, National Research Foundation of Korea
- 2012: KAIST Top 10 Research Achievements
- 2011: Monthly Scientist Award, Daejeon
- 2006: Best Poster Award, Fourth Annual University Symposium on Surface Science and Its Application
- 1998: Samsung Humantech Thesis Award, Samsung Electronics Corporation (Gold Medal)
- 1995: Young Investigator Research Fund Award, Korea Research Foundation
- 1993: Fellowship of Development Fund, Seoul National University
- 1991: Alumni Association Fellowship of Physics Department, Seoul National University

== Selected publications ==
- Park, Jeong Young; Ogletree, DF; Salmeron, Miquel; Ribeiro, RA; Canfield, PC; Jenks, CJ; Thiel, PA (26 August 2005). "High frictional anisotropy of periodic and aperiodic directions on a quasicrystal surface". Science. 309 (5739): 1354–1356. Bibcode:2005Sci...309.1354P. doi:10.1126/science.1113239. PMID 16123295. S2CID 20967375.
- Park, Jeong Young; Ogletree, DF; Thiel, PA; Salmeron, Miquel (14 July 2006). "Electronic control of friction in silicon pn junctions". Science. 313 (5784): 186. doi:10.1126/science.1125017. PMID 16840691. S2CID 2135066.
- Choi, Jin Sik; Kim, Jin-Soo; Byun, Ik-Su; Lee, Duk Hyun; Lee, Mi Jung; Park, Bae Ho; Lee, Changgu; Yoon, Duhee; Cheong, Hyeonsik; Lee, Ki Ho; Son, Young-Woo; Park, Jeong Young; Salmeron, Miquel (29 July 2011). "Friction anisotropy–driven domain imaging on exfoliated monolayer graphene". Science. 333 (6042): 607–610. Bibcode:2011Sci...333..607C. doi:10.1126/science.1207110. PMID 21719640. S2CID 13178683.
- Park, Jeong Young (24 August 2018). "How titanium dioxide cleans itself". Science. 361 (6404): 753. Bibcode:2018Sci...361..753P. doi:10.1126/science.aau6016. PMID 30139859. S2CID 52073460.
- Lee, Hyosun; Lim, Juhyung; Lee, Changhwan; Back, Seoin; An, Kwangjin; Shin, Jae Won; Ryoo, Ryong; Jung, Yousung; Park, Jeong Young (8 June 2018). "Boosting hot electron flux and catalytic activity at metal–oxide interfaces of PtCo bimetallic nanoparticles". Nature Communications. 9 (1): 2235. Bibcode:2018NatCo...9.2235L. doi:10.1038/s41467-018-04713-8. PMC 5993833. PMID 29884825.
- Park, Jeong Young; Baker, L. Robert; Somorjai, Gábor A. (22 April 2015). "Role of hot electrons and metal–oxide interfaces in surface chemistry and catalytic reactions". Chemical Reviews. 115 (8): 2781–2817. doi:10.1021/cr400311p. PMID 25791926.
- Joo, Sang Hoon; Park, Jeong Young; Tsung, Chia-Kuang; Yamada, Yusuke; Yang, Peidong; Somorjai, Gábor A. (23 November 2008). "Thermally stable Pt/mesoporous silica core–shell nanocatalysts for high-temperature reactions". Nature Materials. 8 (2): 126–131. doi:10.1038/nmat2329. PMID 19029893. S2CID 3091948.
- Somorjai, Gábor A.; Frei, Heinz; Park, Jeong Young (25 November 2009). "Advancing the frontiers in nanocatalysis, biointerfaces, and renewable energy conversion by innovations of surface techniques". Journal of the American Chemical Society. 131 (46): 16589–16605. Bibcode:2009JAChS.13116589S. doi:10.1021/ja9061954. OSTI 983116. PMID 19919130. S2CID 207146513.
- Somorjai, Gábor A.; Park, Jeong Young (17 November 2008). "Molecular factors of catalytic selectivity". Angewandte Chemie International Edition. 47 (48): 9212–9228. Bibcode:2008ACIE...47.9212S. doi:10.1002/anie.200803181. OSTI 952862. PMID 19006127.
- Joo, Sang Hoon; Park, Jeong Young; Renzas, J. Russell; Butcher, Derek R.; Huang, Wenyu; Somorjai, Gábor A. (14 July 2010). "Size effect of ruthenium nanoparticles in catalytic carbon monoxide oxidation". Nano Letters. 10 (7): 2709–2713. Bibcode:2010NanoL..10.2709J. doi:10.1021/nl101700j. OSTI 1012367. PMID 20568824.
- Feng, Xiaofeng; Kwon, Sangku; Park, Jeong Young; Salmeron, Miquel (26 February 2013). "Superlubric sliding of graphene nanoflakes on graphene". ACS Nano. 7 (2): 1718–1724. Bibcode:2013ACSNa...7.1718F. doi:10.1021/nn305722d. PMID 23327483.

== See also ==
- Gábor A. Somorjai
- Kuk Young
- Ryoo Ryong
