= Environmental Protection UK =

UK non-governmental organisation

Environmental Protection UK is a UK environmental non-governmental organisation (NGO) working to improve the quality of the local environment - specialising in the subjects of air quality, noise management and land quality. It was formerly known as the National Society for Clean Air and Environmental Protection (NSCA), changing its name 2007, to reflect ongoing work in fields beyond air quality.

== History and early work ==

The organisation traces its roots back to the foundation of the Coal Smoke Abatement Society (CSAS) set up in 1898, making it one of the oldest environmental NGOs. CSAS was founded by London-based artist Sir William Blake Richmond, who became frustrated by low light levels in the winter caused by coal smoke. In an 1898 letter to the Times calling for action Sir William said that, "the darkness was comparable to a total eclipse of the sun".

Over the following decades the CSAS was instrumental in the introduction of the 1926 Public Health (Smoke Abatement Act) and the Clean Air Act 1956. The latter started life as a private members bill promoted by Sir Gerald Nabarro in the aftermath of the Great London Smog of 1952. This event saw the deaths of between 4,000 and 12,000 people as a direct result of air pollution. The original Act was updated by the 1968 and 1993 Clean Air Acts. These Acts led to considerable areas of the UK being declared as Smoke Control Areas where the use of solid fuel is either prohibited or only allowed in authorised appliances. With increasing trends for burning solid fuel either as a lifestyle choice or a perceived cheaper and more sustainable form of heating these laws remain very relevant today.

As the menace of coal smoke receded the society changed its name to the National Society for Clean Air, reflecting a broader focus on air pollution from traditional and emerging sources - including a successful campaign to outlaw stubble burning, crown immunity for incinerators, industrial pollution and transport (including lead in petrol, dirty diesels, low emission zones).

During this period membership was drawn from local authorities, industry, consultancy and academia. Following the Clean Air Acts, NSCA worked closely with specialists and government on developing the concept of Local Air Quality Management and successfully lobbying for its inclusion in the Environment Act 1995. The original Environment Bill covered the establishment of the Environment Agency, contaminated land, National Parks and waste topics.

Through the work two of the Society's vice-presidents (Lord Lewis of Newnham and Lord Nathan) an amendment to the Bill was introduced in the House of Lords (where the Bill began its life) to add what is now Part IV of the Act, Air Quality. The Society assisted in the drafting of the legislation through its Air Quality Committee, set up in 1992 to bring together air quality experts - including local authority officers, consultancy and academia.

== Recent work ==
=== Air quality ===
Since the Act received its Royal Assent in 1995 the Society, through the Air Quality Committee, has been instrumental in producing supplementary guidance documents to assist local authorities in implementing Local Air Quality Management. Although Government had produced technical and policy guidance this still left some grey areas because such national guidance inevitably could not deal with every eventuality. Initially the NSCA guidance addressed the processes of assessing air quality problems and the thorny questions surrounding the declaration of Air Quality Management Areas. A second round of guidance looked at the development of Air Quality Action Plans. More recent guidance has addressed the thornier problems of incorporating air quality into the local development control planning regime.

Air quality continues to be a major problem in the UK. In 1998, the Government's Committee on the Medical Effects of Air Pollution (COMEAP) estimated that approximately 24,000 deaths per year are advanced due to the effects of “normal” UK concentrations of air pollution. In hot years such as 2003 this figure may have been even larger. EPUK founded and launched the Healthy Air Campaign in 2011 - now being co-ordinated by Client Earth. Air pollution remains a significant health threat - with the UK facing the threat of fines from the EU for breaching air quality guidelines - so the work of the EPUK air quality committee remains crucial.

=== Noise ===
The organisation has a long-standing interest in noise issues - in 1984 publishing 'Noise and Society', prompted by a rise in concern about noise - in particular from traffic, over the preceding 20 years. The NSCA Noise Committee was formed in 1986, in particular in response to increasing concerns about the poor quality of sound insulation in flat conversions - and the committee undertook a survey and reported on the problem. This influenced the development of sound legislation regulation. This marked the beginning of increasing involvement in working in the UK and EU on developing practical and policy solutions both in neighbour noise and environmental (transport) noise.

=== Neighbourhood noise ===
NSCA first co-ordinated a 'Noise Awareness Day' in 1997 - engaging around 50 local authorities in raising awareness of neighbourhood noise problems. During the following years the initiative gained increasing support - at its height attracting funding from all the UK government administrations, engaging at least 200 local authority participants and gaining national press coverage. To support the day and annual noise survey was undertaken, to gauge levels of noise complaint and views on effective solutions. During this time it expanded to Noise Action Week - which is still going strong, running in the third week of May. It receives increasing support from housing providers, alongside local authority noise teams, mediation services and schools.

=== Environmental noise ===
Transport is a major source of environmental noise - and, like air pollution, has a huge impact on the health of those exposed - second only to air pollution according to the World Health Organisation. EPUK worked closely with European partners lobbying for the reduction of vehicle noise - in particular on ensuring tyre noise was included on the environmental tyre labels to be in introduced in November 2012 - running a Campaign for Better Tyres in the UK 2010 - 2012. EPUK was also influential in the development of the Noise Policy Statement England - Noise Policy Statement England (NPSE) published in 2010.

The organisation also worked with industry and government in trying to achieve an up-to-date methodology for the prediction of wind turbine noise.

=== EPUK today ===
Environmental Protection UK continues to have membership amongst local authorities with a substantial contribution from consultants, academics, private individuals and industry. The organisation has seven divisions in England and a division each in Scotland, Wales and Northern Ireland. Environmental Protection UK is national member of the International Union of Air Pollution Prevention and Environmental Protection Associations (IUAPPA).

In 2023, Environmental Protection UK merged into the Institution of Environmental Sciences, facilitating the creation of the Environmental Policy Implementation Community.

== See also ==
- Air pollution in the United Kingdom
