= Odour Special Interest Group =

Australian sub-committee

The Odour Special Interest Group (OSIG) is a sub-committee of the Clean Air Society of Australia and New Zealand and provides an important national forum in Australia and New Zealand for the exchange of information, and in encouraging improved practices in odour measurement, modelling, assessment, control, management and monitoring. The current OSIG Chair is Michael Assal of The Odour Unit.

There are important challenges to the air quality community involved in odour to advance the technical, planning and regulatory aspects of odour assessment and management. The aim of OSIG, amongst other functions, is to help develop methods and approaches for assessing potential odour impacts that are transparent and can be cited as officially accepted by air quality professionals within Australia and New Zealand.
