= Clean Air Society of Australia and New Zealand =

Non-governmental, non-profit organization

The Clean Air Society of Australia and New Zealand (CASANZ) is a non-governmental, non-profit organization formed in the 1960s to bring together people with an interest in clean air and the study of air pollution. Its focus has since grown to include broader environmental management affairs, but with special emphasis on air quality and related issues.

As of October 2005, the society had 836 members (683 in Australia, 140 in New Zealand, and 13 in other countries). In September 2007, CASANZ hosted the 14th IUAPPA World Congress in Brisbane, Australia.

== Activities promoting environmental protection ==
CASANZ promotes the protection of the environment by a variety of activities, including:

- Advancement of knowledge and practical experience of environmental and air quality management.
- Providing an organization which gathers and distributes the experience and knowledge of its members.
- Providing lectures, exhibitions, public meetings and conferences that expand knowledge of environmental matters and, in particular, air quality—including causes, effects, measurement, legislative aspects and control of air pollution.
- Liaison with organizations having similar interests in other countries.
- Providing scholarships, monetary grants, awards and prizes to encourage the study of relevant subjects.

== Operation and governing ==
CASANZ operates through autonomous branches which determine their own programs of activities, including technical meetings, seminars, workshops, conferences, training courses, etc. Details of these activities are circulated to branch members and posted on the society's online web site.

CASANZ is governed by an Executive Committee consisting of:

- An elected Executive Director
- Other officers and representatives nominated by the branches.

The Executive Committee manages the day-to-day activities of the society and directs the work of the Executive Director.

== Special Interest Groups ==
As of September 2013, CASANZ has eight Special Interest Groups (commonly referred to as SIGs).

=== Modelling Special Interest Group ===
The objective of the Modelling Special Interest Group is to bring together CASANZ members who have an interest in the development and/or application of atmospheric dispersion modeling in order to exchange ideas, identify common problems, inform members of new developments, and establish, as appropriate, a 'ModSIG view' on issues of relevance.

Dispersion modelling is becoming more and more a part of licensing emissions to the atmosphere throughout Australia, and there is growing awareness of the role that air quality modelling can play in areas such as air resource management, risk assessment and land-use planning.

=== Odour Special Interest Group ===
The Odour Special Interest Group is a forum for the exchange of information, and in encouraging improved practices in odour measurement, modelling, assessment, control, management and monitoring.

=== Indoor Air Special Interest Group ===
The Indoor Air Special Interest Group promotes discussion and debate on the state of knowledge and the quality of indoor air, and on related environmental health concerns. The group encourages research, education, community awareness and management of issues related to this topic.

=== Greenhouse Special Interest Group ===
The purpose of the Greenhouse Special Interest Group is threefold:

- To identify the research and development work being done at national and international levels on the science of greenhouse and global climate modelling as well as the developments being undertaken to assess and quantify the impact of climate change.
- To inform CASANZ members and the broader community on greenhouse gas emissions, emission scenarios, regional contributions and economic and technological developments.
- To provide response to government policies and initiatives in the area of energy reform and greenhouse abatement so as to stimulate debate amongst members and the broader community.

=== Measurement Special Interest Group ===
The primary objective of the Measurement Special Interest Group is to ensure that atmospheric pollutants in the ambient air and industrial source emissions are measured utilising methods that are fit for that purpose.

The objective is to be achieved by: conducting workshops, developing decision trees to assist in selecting appropriate air pollution measurement test methods and developing source emission and ambient air quality test methods in cooperation with Standards Australia and Standards New Zealand.

=== Transport Special Interest Group ===
The Transport Emissions and Fuel Consumption Modeling Special Interest Group (or simply the Transport Special Interest Group) focuses on the quantification and modelling of air pollutant and greenhouse gas impacts from all forms of transport and their support equipment. The Transport Special Interest Group is intended to be a platform for information sharing, discussion of emerging issues and coordination.

=== Risk Assessment Interest Group ===
The Risk Assessment Interest Group exists to be knowledgeable and supportive of governmental policy developments involving risk assessment, such as:

- The National Air Quality Standards (Air NEPM) which were developed with the help of risk assessment.
- Variations to the State of Victoria's Environment Protection Policy for Air Quality Management to incorporate formalised risk assessments.
- The National Environmental Health Strategy, which includes risk assessment as a basis for decision making.
- The Australian Standard for Risk Management (AS4360-1999).
- The proposal to develop a coordinated national strategy for air toxics.

=== Air Policy Special Interest Group ===
The purpose of the Air Policy Special Interest Group is to bring together CASANZ members interested in advancing air policy development and contributing to responsible air quality related risk communication by:

- Exchanging ideas, and informing members of new air policy related developments and air quality issues of significant public concern.
- Coordinating and communicating science-based inputs for air policy, legislative and regulatory development processes.
- Collating and communicating science-based information to communities and decision makers on pressing air quality related issues, including official inquiries

== See also ==
- Clean Ocean Foundation of Australia
- Australian Conservation Foundation
