= Kyunggi High School =

All-boys high school in Seoul, South Korea

- 경기고등학교
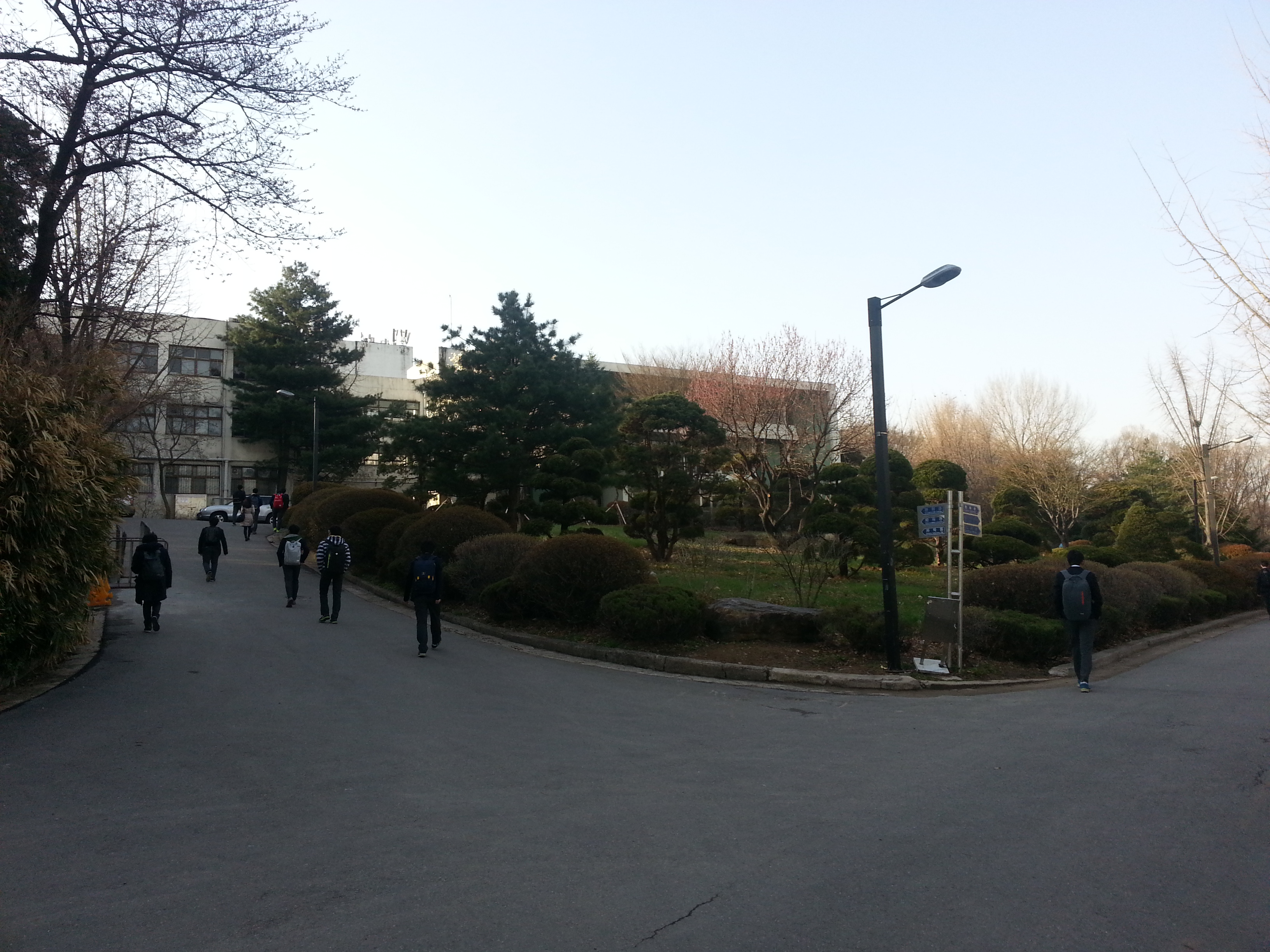

Location
- 643 Yeongdong-daero, Gangnam District; Seoul; South Korea
- 37°31′02″N 127°03′21″E

Information
- Type: Public, Secondary
- Established: 1899
- Principal: Choi Kwang-rak (최광락)
- Gender: Boys
- Website: kyunggi.sen.hs.kr

Korean name
- Hangul: 경기고등학교
- Hanja: 京畿高等學校
- RR: Gyeonggi godeunghakgyo
- MR: Kyŏnggi kodŭnghakkyo

Kyunggi High School (Korean: 경기고등학교; Hanja: 京畿高等學校) is the oldest modern high school in Korea, located in Gangnam District, Seoul. The school is an all-boys school, and its counterpart is Kyunggi Girls' High School, also located in Gangnam District, Seoul.

Kyunggi High School has educated many leaders of the South Korean society. It is the "K" in the so-called "K-S mark," an informal reference to educational credentials said to ensure career success, with the "S" standing for Seoul National University. Before the abolition of the high-school entrance exams in 1974, it was the highest-ranked school in the country.

== History ==
The school was established by an edict of Emperor Gojong on April 4, 1899, and opened its doors on November 10, 1900. The school's original name was Gwallib Middle School (관립중학교). Its establishment was part of a general program of educational modernization. This effort at modernization was swallowed up by the Japanese annexation in 1910, but the school itself survived. Originally chartered as a middle school, it became a high school in 1906, though it continued to offer middle-school classes until 1971.

In 2000, the South Korean government issued a commemorative 170-won stamp, marking the school's 100th anniversary.

- September 1, 1906: Renamed to National Hansung High School.
- November 1, 1910: Annexed Hansung Foreign Language School and renamed to Kyungsung High School.
- April 1, 1911: Opened a one-year course for producing teachers and renamed to Kyungsung First Middle School.
- April 1, 1938: Renamed to National Kyunggi Middle School.
- June 4, 1938: Set the school's flag.
- October 1, 1945: Lee Hun-gu (이헌구) was the 15th principal of the school and was also the first ethnic Korean to be a school principal since World War II began.
- August 31, 1951: Divided into two schools (Kyunggi Middle School and Kyunggi High School) according to the new law.
- June 25, 1954: Set the school's new flag.
- August 15, 1955: Constructed a new building for Hwa-dong (화동) middle school.
- January 27, 1956: Set the school's motto to liberal, culturally advanced, and peaceful people.
- February 28, 1971: Kyunggi Middle School is closed.
- November 11, 1971: Opened a hall of residence for freshmen. Every freshman spends two weeks/per year in this dormitory.
- March 1, 1974: The government abolished the high-school entrance exams. This highest-ranked high school was populated by the students who live near the school.
- February 20, 1976: Relocated to 74-4 Samsung-dong Gangnam-gu, Seoul, South Korea.
- August 3, 1981: Founded a juridical foundation named Hwa-Dong-Yuk-Young-Hoe. (화동육영회)
- October 3, 1983: Constructed a new building for the alumni association.
- October 3, 1990: Built a school motto stone.
- December 6, 1997: Constructed a new building named Hwa-dong-kwan (화동관) for accommodating more students.
- February 2010: Hosted the 106th annual graduation commencement.
- July 2010: Selected as a high school specialized on science.
- Summer 2010: Principal Lee Jung-gon (이정곤) resigned over power abuse scandals.
- February 2011: Hosted the 107th annual graduation commencement.

== Notable alumni ==
- Choi Kyu-hah: politician, the 4th President of the Republic of Korea
- Lee Soo-young: businessman, former President of the Korea Employers Association
- Chung Un-chan: economist, former President of Seoul National University
- Kim Geun-tae: politician
- Kim Woo-choong: founder and former chairman of Daewoo Group
- Koo Jun-yup: singer and member of K-pop dance duo CLON
- Benjamin W. Lee: theoretical physicist
- Lee Hoi-chang: politician, former Prime Minister of the Republic of Korea
- Seung-hwan Oh: baseball player, Olympic gold medalist
- Nam June Paik: inventor of video art, recipient of the 1st Class Order of Cultural Merit, the Picasso Medal, the Kyoto Prize in Arts and Philosophy and the Golden Lion at the Venice Biennale
- Park Tae-hwan: swimmer, the first-ever South Korean Olympic gold medalist in swimming
- Kuk Young: physicist, the 4th President of Daegu Gyeongbuk Institute of Science and Technology
- Oh Se-jung: politician and the 27th President of Seoul National University
- Son Hak-gyu: politician and the former governor of Gyeonggi Province
- Hong Seok-hyun: former South Korean ambassador to the United States and the Chairman of JoongAng Holdings
- Bang Si-hyuk: songwriter and producer, founder and chairman of HYBE Corporation
- Park Jin-young: actor and member of the South Korean boy band GOT7
- Pak Hon-yong: Korean independence activist during the Japanese colonial rule

== See also ==
- Education in South Korea
