= Korean VLBI Network =

Korean observatory

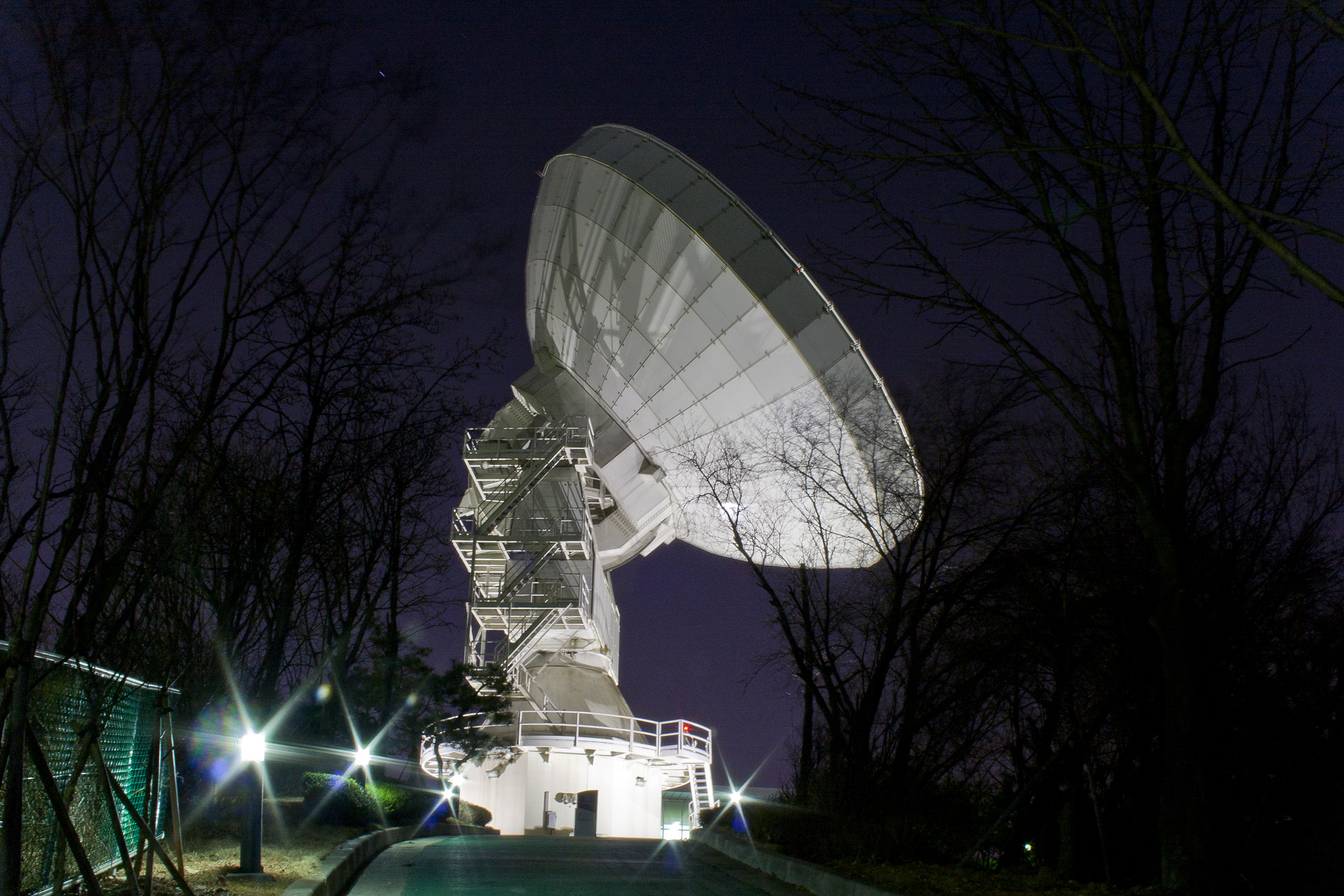
- The telescope in Yonsei
- Location: Seoul; Ulsan; Jeju Island
- Coordinates: 37°33′44″N 126°56′35″E
- Wavelength: 2 mm (150 GHz)–14 mm (21 GHz)
- Diameter: 21 m (68 ft 11 in)
- Website: radio.kasi.re.kr/kvn/main_kvn.php
- Location within South Korea
- Related media on Commons

The Korean VLBI Network (KVN) is a radio astronomy observatory located in South Korea. It comprises three 21-meter radio telescopes that function as an interferometer, using the technique of very-long-baseline interferometry (VLBI).

== Characteristics ==
The KVN has three main dishes, each of 21m diameter and at respective separations of 300–500 km. All three dishes are located on university campus. Two are on the Korean peninsula: Yonsei University (KY) and Ulsan University (KU), and the third is located on Jeju Island on the campus of Jeju International University (formerly Tamna University; KT). The KVN antennas are Cassegrain-types with alt-az mounts. Each telescope has a 21-m diameter main reflector with a focal length of 6.78 m. The main reflectors consist of 200 aluminum panels each with a manufacturing surface accuracy of 65 microns.

A fourth telescope, the existing 14m dish located at the Taeduk Radio Astronomy Observatory, will be linked to the KVN in the future via optical fiber networks.

KVN focuses on millimeter-wavelength VLBI, and is designed to make simultaneous measurements at four different observing frequencies: 22, 43, 86, and 129 GHz. The telescopes can operate together with VLBI networks in Japan and China the East Asian VLBI Network (EAVN). The EAVN consists of 19 antennae with a maximum baseline of 5000 km operating at 22 GHz; it can also operate at 43 GHz using only 9 antennae. The first fringes for EAVN at 22 GHz were successfully detected in 2009.

The KVN has also successfully been used for real-time VLBI between Korea and Europe.

== Key science ==
KVN studies the formation and death processes of stars, the structure and dynamics of the Milky Way, the nature of active galactic nuclei, and other astronomical topics. KVN is also used for geodesy in detecting tectonic movements in the Korean Peninsula.

== Visiting ==
The visitor center for KVN is located at the Advanced Science & Technology Center on the campus of Yonsei University in Seoul.

== See also ==
- List of radio telescopes
- Very-long-baseline interferometry (VLBI)
