= Taeduk Radio Astronomy Observatory =

- Alternative names: TRAO
- Organization: Korea Astronomy and Space Science Institute
- Location: Daejeon, ROK
- Coordinates: 36°23′51″N 127°22′31″E
- Altitude: 109 m (358 ft)
- Established: October 1986
- Website: radio.kasi.re.kr
- Telescopes: Taeduk 14m radio telescope
- Location of Taeduk Radio Astronomy Observatory

The Taeduk Radio Astronomy Observatory, or TRAO is an astronomical observatory owned and operated by Korea Astronomy and Space Science Institute. It is located in the science town of Taeduk, part of Daejeon, South Korea.

== History ==
Founded in 1986, it is with a run through a cooperative agreement with the Ministry of Science and Technology of South Korea.

== Equipment ==
- 14 meter radio telescope
