= Kil-Choo Moon =

South Korean environmental scientist

- 문길주
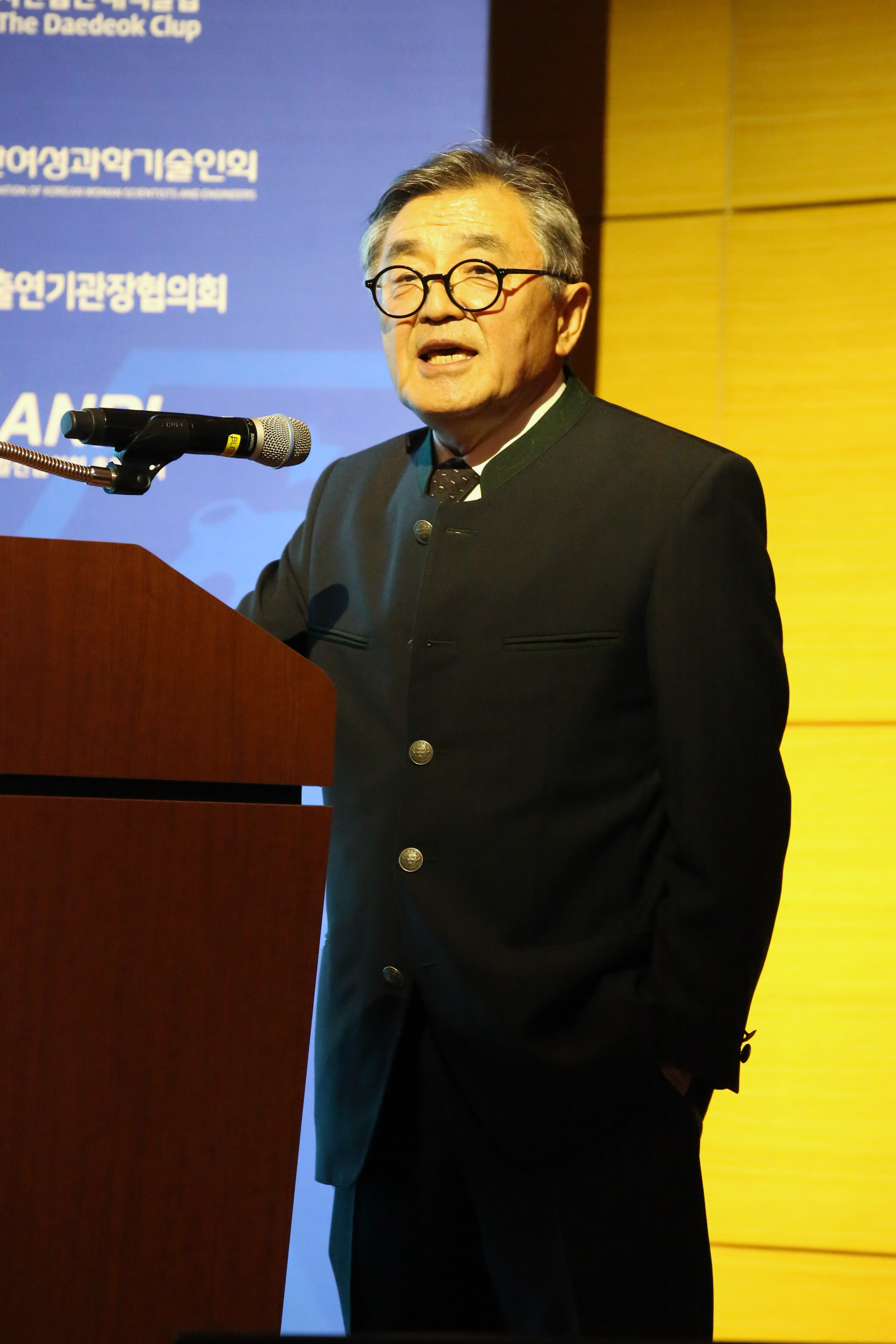
- Citizenship: Korean
- Scientific career
- Institutions: Korea University, Korea University of Science and Technology, Korea Institute of Science and Technology, International Union of Air Pollution Prevention and Environmental Protection Associations

Korean name
- Hangul: 문길주
- RR: Mun Gilju
- MR: Mun Kilchu
- Website: www.ust.ac.kr

Kil-Choo Moon (Korean: 문길주) is a South Korean environmental scientist and President of the International Union of Air Pollution Prevention and Environmental Protection Associations (IUAPPA). He has served as President of the Korea Institute of Science and Technology and of the Korea University of Science and Technology and a Distinguished Professor of Korea University.

== Academic background and professional experience ==
Kil-Choo Moon studied Mechanical Engineering, University of Ottawa (B.S.,1978), Canada; Mechanical Engineering, University of Minnesota (M.S.,1980) and Mechanical Engineering (Particle Technology, Air Pollution Group) (Ph.D.,1984).

Kil-Choo Moon was Director, Directorate for National Science and Engineering Programs, National Research Foundation of Korea; Vice President KIST (2006–2009); Director, Global Environmental Research Center, KIST (1997–2001), Director, Environment Research Center, KIST (1992-1997).

== Professional responsibilities ==
- Executive President, IUAPPA (2010-)
- Executive Vice President, IUAPPA (2004–2010)
- President, Korea Society for Atmospheric Environment (KOSAE) (2008–2009)
- Chairman, A&WMA Korean Section (1997–2008)
- President, Korean Association for Aerosol and Particle Research (KAPAR) (1996–1997)
- Member, Air and Waste Management Association|Air & Waste Management Association (AWMA)
- Member, Society of Automotive Engineering (SAE)
- Member, American Association for Aerosol Research (AAAR)

== Awards ==
- Member, National Academy of Engineering of Korea (NAEK)
- Ungbi Medal, Order of Science and Technology Merit (2006)
- Scientific Award, KOSAE (2004)
- Certification of Honor, IUAPPA, England (2001)
- Ministry Citation, Ministry of Environment (1994)

== Selected publications ==
- Kil-Choo Moon:Charging Mechanism of Submicron Diesel Particles, University of Minnesota, 1984 – 484 pages
- Kil-Choo Moon et al.:Fine particle measurements at two background sites in Korea between 1996 and 1997, Atmospheric Environment, Volume 35, Issue 4, 2001, Pages 635–643
