= HLA (radio station) =

Time signal transmitter in South Korea

Coordinates: 36.38753°N 127.36650°E

HLA is a time signal radio station in Daejeon, South Korea, operated by the Korea Research Institute of Standards and Science. Established on November 24, 1984, it transmits a 2 kW signal on 5 MHz (±0.01 Hz). Originally only transmitted for 7 hours per day (01:00–08:00), 5 days per week (M–F), it is continuous as of 2011. There are over 100 users of the signal in Korea.

It broadcasts a time signal similar to that of the WWV and WWVH stations with which it shares a frequency:

- Second pulses are 5 ms (9 cycles) of 1.8 kHz, beginning on the second
- Seconds 29 and 59 are omitted
- Minute markers are 800 ms of the same frequency
- Hour markers are 800 ms of 1.5 kHz
- DUT1 is encoded using doubled pulses
- Voice time announcements are made after second 52
- A time code is transmitted on a 100 Hz subcarrier
