= Korea Astronomy and Space Science Institute =

South Korean research institute

- 한국천문연구원
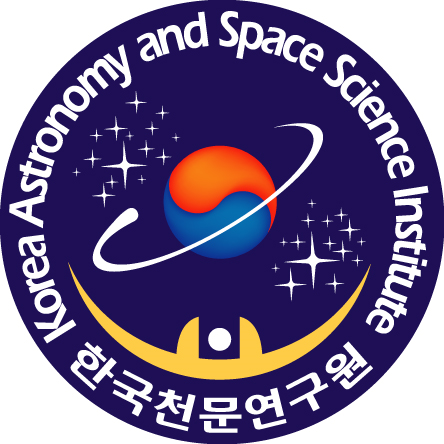

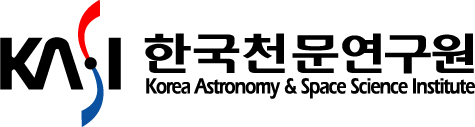

Agency overview
- Abbreviation: KASI
- Formed: September, 1974
- Type: Space agency
- Headquarters: Yuseong, Daejeon
- Administrator: Park, Young Deuk (박영득)
- Owner: South Korea
- Website: www.kasi.re.kr

- Korea Astronomy and Space Science Institute
- Hangul: 한국천문연구원
- Hanja: 韓國天文硏究院
- RR: Hanguk cheonmun yeonguwon
- MR: Han'guk ch'ŏnmun yŏn'guwŏn

The Korea Astronomy and Space Science Institute (KASI; Korean: 한국천문연구원) is the national research institute in astronomy and space science of South Korea funded by the South Korean Government. Its headquarters are located in Daejeon, in the Daedeok Science Town. Research at KASI covers main areas of modern astronomy, including Optical Astronomy, Radio Astronomy, Space Science, and Theoretical Astronomy. As of May 2024, KASI is an affiliated research institute of the Korea AeroSpace Administration.

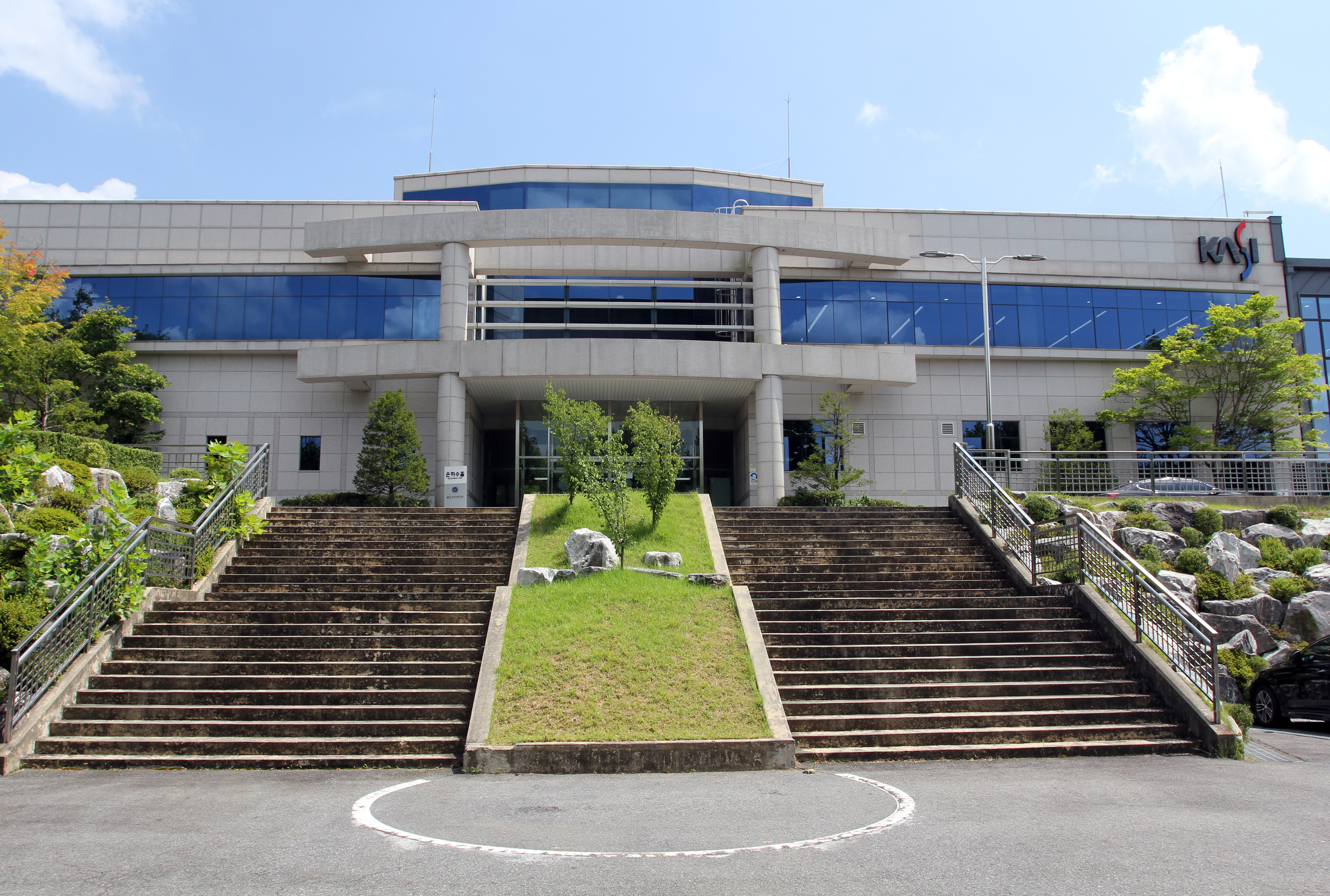
Main building

== See also ==
- Bohyunsan Optical Astronomy Observatory (BOAO)
- Korean VLBI Network (KVN)
- Korea University of Science and Technology
