= Korea Research Institute of Bioscience and Biotechnology =

South Korean research institute

Coordinates: 36°22′38.46″N 127°21′30.49″E

Korea Research Institute of Bioscience and Biotechnology (KRIBB)
- 한국생명공학연구원
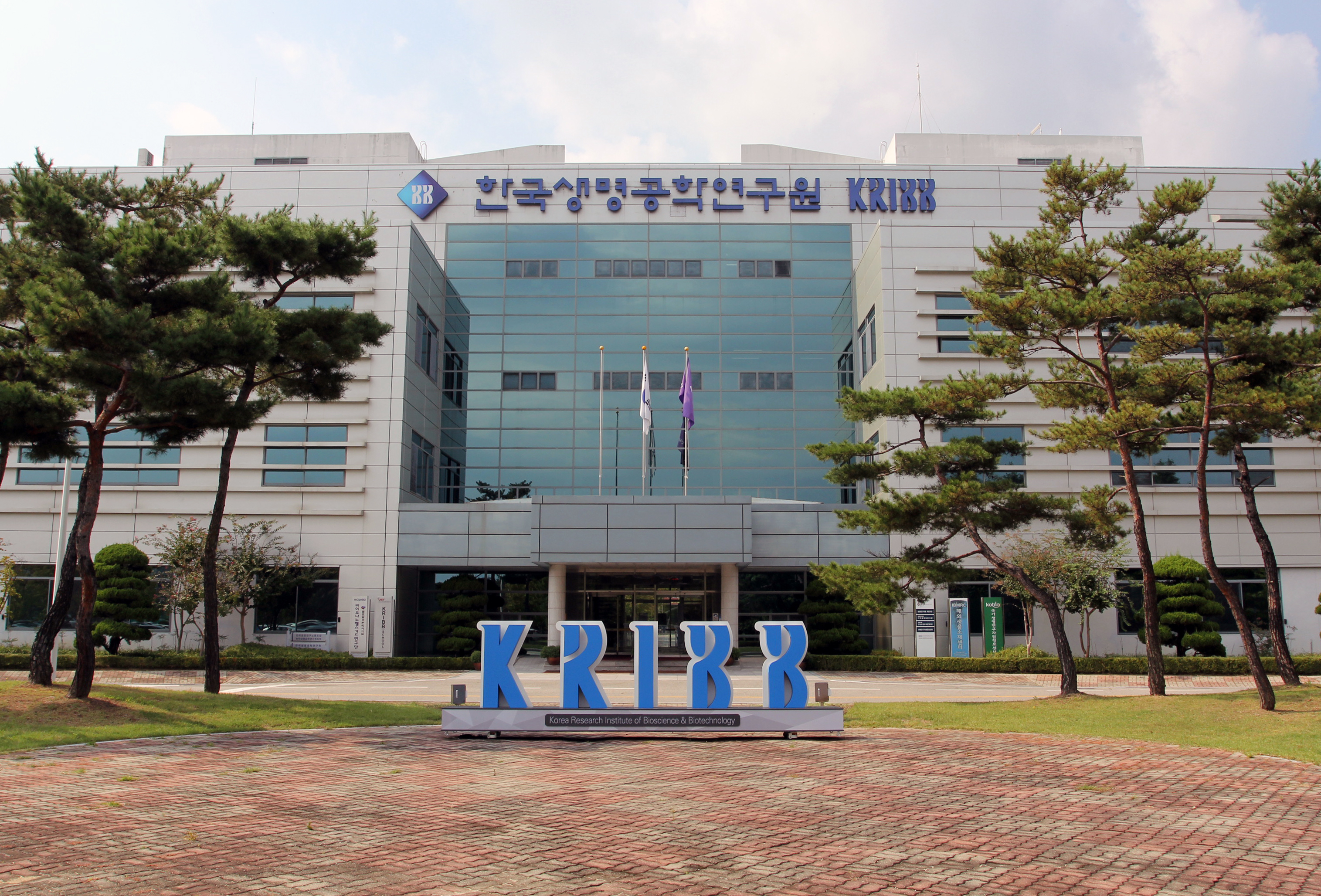

Agency overview
- Abbreviation: KRIBB
- Formed: February 1985
- Type: Government-funded research institute
- Headquarters: Yuseong, Daejeon
- Owner: South Korean government
- Website: www.kribb.re.kr/eng

Korea Research Institute of Bioscience and Biotechnology (KRIBB; Korean: 한국생명공학연구원) is a government research institute in Daejeon, South Korea. It is dedicated to biotechnology research across a broad span of expertise, from basic studies for the fundamental understanding of life phenomena to applied studies such as drug discovery, novel biomaterials, integrated biotechnology and bioinformation.

KRIBB was established in 1985. Its accomplishments include the advancement of welfare and medical technology, an increase in food production, a cleaner environment and new bio-materials and energy sources.

It has identified reasons for the failure of animal cloning, conducted a comparative study of chimpanzee genes and successfully analyzed the structure of the reactive oxygen species switch protein, which became the first study by Korean scholars to be published in Cell, an international scientific journal. The institute was ranked first in the discovery of new microorganisms, including the indigenous microorganisms of the Dokdo Islets, for four consecutive years.

Its recent accomplishments include the development of a genome capable of controlling cancer cell proliferation and the identification of a neuropeptide Y-based growth control mechanism, with possibilities for new treatments for cancer, diabetes, obesity and ageing. Nano–bio sensor research led to the development of the world's smallest surface plasmon resonance biochip.

== History ==
February 1985	Established as a genetic engineering center in Seoul
July 1990	Moved to its current campus in Daejeon
March 1995	Changed its name to KRIBB
September 2005	Established Ochang campus
November 2006	Established Jeonbuk campus

== Mission ==
- Carry out R&D activities and related projects in bioscience and biotechnology with other research institutes, academic, and businesses at home and abroad
- Disseminate the results of its scientific research and technological development

== Objectives ==
- Research and development in bioscience and biotechnology and support for research projects
- Domestic and overseas cooperation among industry, academia and research institutes and distribution of the results

== Key functions ==
- Advanced R&D and development and distribution of generic technologies in bioscience and biotechnology
- Public infrastructure development support for research on bioscience at home and abroad

== Facilities ==
- Headquarters (Human Gene Bank, Plant Extract Bank, KCTC): 100,978 square metres (1,086,920 sq ft)
- Bio-Therapeutic Research Institute (Ochang Campus): 212,258 square metres (2,284,730 sq ft)
- Bio-Materials Research Institute (Jeonbuk Campus): 43,559 square metres (468,870 sq ft)

== See also ==
- Korea Brain Research Institute
