= Korea Institute of Science and Technology Information =

Research institute in South Korea

- 한국과학기술정보연구원

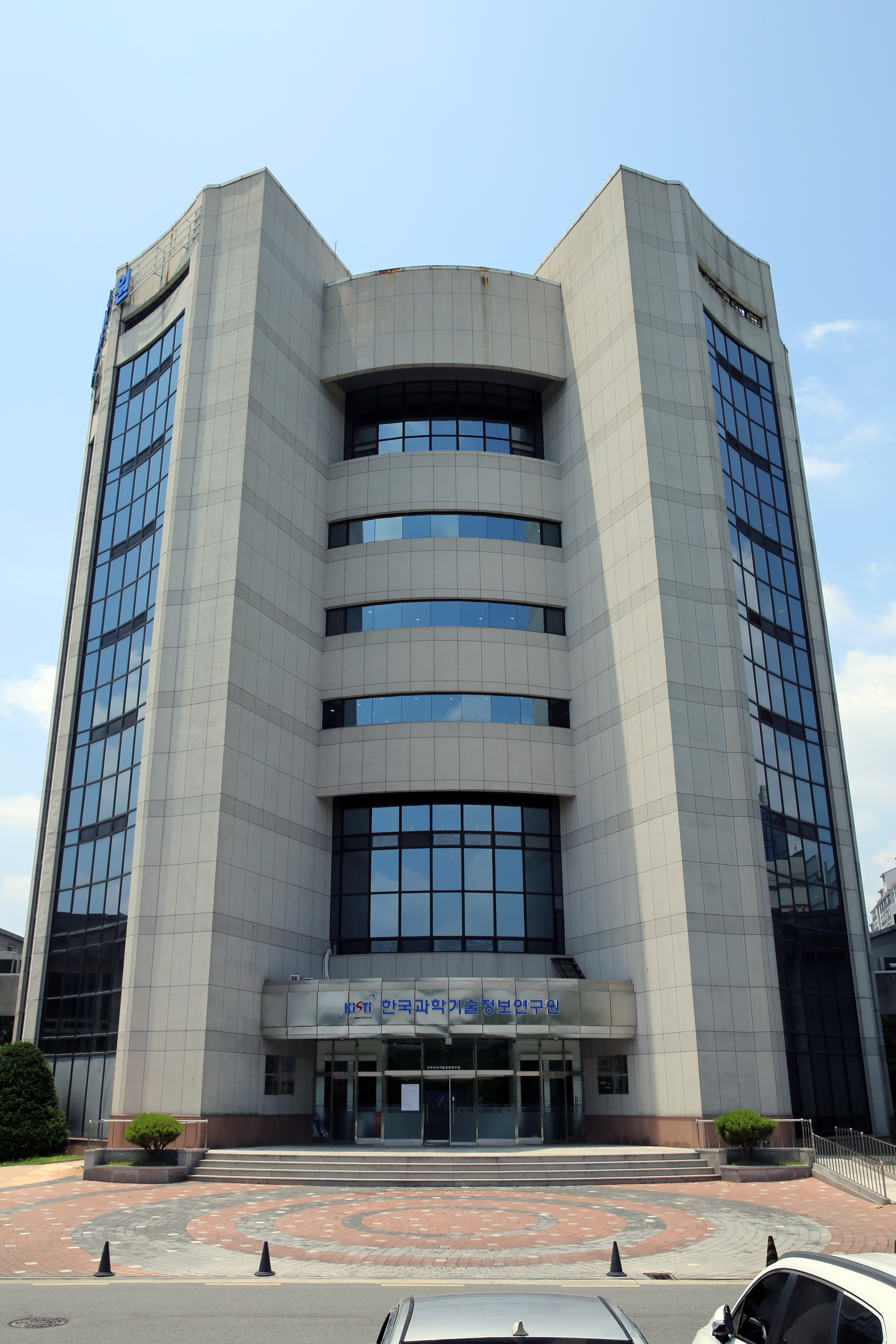
- Type: Governmental organization
- Headquarters: Daejeon, South Korea
- Location: Daedeok Science Town, Daejeon, South Korea
- Coordinates: 36°21′56″N 127°21′34″E
- Website: www.kisti.re.kr/eng

- Korea Institute of Science and Technology Information
- Hangul: 한국과학기술정보연구원
- Hanja: 韓國科學技術情報研究院
- RR: Hanguk gwahak gisul jeongbo yeonguwon
- MR: Han'guk kwahak kisul chŏngbo yŏn'guwŏn

The Korea Institute of Science and Technology Information (KISTI; Korean: 한국과학기술정보연구원) is a government-funded research institute under the Ministry of Science and ICT of South Korea. Established in 1962 and headquartered in Daedeok Science Town, Daejeon. KISTI supports national research and development (R&D) by providing science and technology information services, data analytics, and high-performance computing (HPC) resources. KISTI operates national platforms such as the National Science & Technology Information Service (NTIS) and leads efforts in digital transformation, innovation policy, and international scientific collaboration.

== History ==
KISTI was founded in 1962 as the Korean Science and Technological Information Center, and was later reorganized in 1982 into the Korean Institute for Industrial Economics and Trade (KINTI).

In 2002, the institute underwent its final reorganization when KINTI merged with the Korea Research and Development Information Center. In 2004, KISTI was designated as the first government funded research institute. In 2005, the institute was designated as the managing organization for the National Science & Technology Information Service.

== Timeline ==
Date	Changes
2010.09	Built Hub of Large-Scale Test Data Center
2010.08	Designated as a Center for National Nanotechnology Policy
2009.09	Founded the Association of Science and Technology Information (ASTI)
2009.05	Introduced Supercomputer No. 4
2008.07	Opened the Remote Control Center for Accelerator Testing
2005.10	Designated as the agency responsible for developing the National Technology Information System
2005.08	Opened the Global Ring Network for Advanced Application Development (GLORIAD)
2005.03	Opened a Science & Technology Information Protection Center
2001.07	Designated as an agency for building Science & Technology Information Control and Distribution System
2001.01	Built Science & Technology Information Portal Service System.
2001.01	Established KISTI
2000.02	Integration of KINITI and KORDIC
1999.01	Reorganized as a Research Society under the Prime Minister's Office
1997.08	Opened Integrated Service Network (Inno-NET)
1994.03	Established Technology Transfer Information Center
1994.02	Designated as an Integrated Information Agency for Science and Technology Information
1993.12	Held The 1st Korea-Japan TechnoMart
1993.12	Opened Korea-Russia Industrial Cooperation Information Center
1993.11	Ran Supercomputer No. 2 (CRAY C/90)
1993.04	Established Korea Research & Development Information Center (KORDIC)
1991.02	Project (under System Engineering Research Institute)
1991.02	Launched the Science and Technology Information Distribution
1991.01	Opened Korea Institute of Industry and Technology Information (KINITI)
1988.10	Ran Supercomputer No.1 (CRAY 2S)
1988.05	Opened Center for Industrial Technology Information (CITI)
1986.06	Held 'Workshop on International Technology Transfer'
1985.07	Established Technology Information Distribution Center
1984.10	Started an Online DB Information Service
1982.	Reorganized into Korea Institute for Industrial Economics & Trade (KIET)
1978.02	Operated IBM Model 138
1975.	Developed Korean Information Processing System (KIPS)
1975.07	Started Information Service based on Database
1962.01	Established Korea Science & Technology Information Center (KORSTIC)

== Presidents ==
Name	Hangul name	Term
Cho Young-hwa	조영화	August 2000 - August 2006
Yang Byung-tae	양병태	August 2006–August 2008
Park Young-seo	박영서	August 2008–September 2014
Han Seon-hwa	한선화	September 2014–January 2018
Choi Hee-yoo	최희윤	January 2018–March 2021
Kim Jae-soo	김재수	March 2021–November 2024
Lee Sik	이식	November 2024–Present

== See also ==
- Korea University of Science and Technology
