= International Union of Air Pollution Prevention and Environmental Protection Associations =

IUAPPA (International Union of Air Pollution Prevention and Environmental Protection Associations)
- Formation: 1964–65, Buenos Aires
- Type: Non-governmental organization
- Purpose: Environmentalism, air pollution, sustainable development
- Headquarters: Burgess Hill, West Sussex, United Kingdom
- Region served: Worldwide
- President: Kil-Choo Moon
- Director General: Richard Mills
- Main organ: International Board
- Website: www.iuappa.org

The International Union of Air Pollution Prevention and Environmental Protection Associations (IUAPPA) is an international federation of civil society organisations concerned with air pollution. IUAPPA, founded 1964 at the urging of the US Air Pollution Control Association, has 40 national organisations from countries such as the United States (Air and Waste Management Association), Germany (Verein Deutscher Ingenieure) and Japan (Japan Environmental Management Association for Industry) and has networks and representatives in most others countries. The Foundation is seen as one milestone in the "Ecological Revolution" in and around 1970.

== Focus ==
The focus of IUAPPA is "the development and implementation of more effective policies for the prevention and control of air pollution, the protection of the environment and the adoption of sustainable development". IUAPPA wants to achieve the adoption and effective implementation of policies which can secure a clean and healthy atmospheric environment, together with scientists, policy-makers, regulators, business and citizen groups with this same objective.

The Global Atmospheric Pollution Forum was initiated by IUAPPA and the Stockholm Environment Institute. European Federation of Clean Air and Environmental Protection Associations (EFCA) was founded by the core of European members of the International Union of Air Pollution Prevention and Environmental Protection Associations, IUAPPA

== Governance ==
The IUAPPA secretariat is in Burgess Hill, West Sussex, United Kingdom. The president is Kil-Choo Moon of the Korea Institute of Science and Technology and the director general is Richard Mills. IUAPPA is governed by an International Board which consists of the President, Vice-Presidents, Immediate Past President and Honorary Treasurer, together with one authorised representative from each Full Member of the Union.

== Partners and Members ==
IUAPPA is a partner of UNEP Climate and Clean Air Coalition and has worked close together over the past decades with UNEP and WHO.

Selected Members

- Clean Air Society of Australia and New Zealand
- Commission on Air Pollution Prevention of VDI and DIN – KRdL, Kommission Reinhaltung der Luft im VDI und DIN - Normenausschuss KRdL
- Japanese Union of Air Pollution Prevention Associations (JUAPPA), Nihon Taiki Kougai Boushi Dantai Rengoukai
- Environmental Protection UK, formerly National Society for Clean Air and Environmental Protection - NSCA
- Air & Waste Management Association
- Cercl'Air, Switzerland, Service de l'environnement
- The Swedish Clean Air Society

== World Clean Air Congress ==
The World Clean Air Congress, first organized by IUAPPA in 1966, is held every two or three years. It is one of the major international gatherings on atmospheric sciences and policy with 1,500 participants. Some of the more recent congresses are:

- the 16th IUAPPA World Clean Air Congress, Many Nations – One Atmosphere: Plotting the Path to Sustainability was held at the Cape Town, with a call on South African industry to show leadership and comply with emission standards. Delegates at the 16th congress heard mostly poor South Africans were exposed to pollutants. "The people that are exposed to the smog are almost always the people that cannot afford to pay the doctors' bills for bronchitis, asthma or, worse, lung cancer," Environmental Affairs Minister Edna Molewa said in a speech.
- the 17th IUAPPA World Clean Air Congress, Mega Cities Perspective, Healthier and Greener Future, held in Busan, Korea in 2016
- the 18th IUAPPA World Clean Air Congress, One Atmosphere: Climate and Air Pollution Interactions and Challenges", held in Istanbul, 23-27th September 2019. The Congress includes over 250 scientific papers, five Plenary Sessions and six major Side Events. Selected papers were published in Science of the Total Environment and Atmospheric Pollution Research, in addition to Proceedings of Abstracts 18th World Clean Air Congress. Professor Selahattin Incecik has been the President of IUAPPA since 2017.

== Resolutions and declarations ==
Ever since it was founded in 1964 the Union has had a long-term interest in the relationship between air pollution and the Earth's climate. Policy declarations in 1989 were one of the first to focus on climate change. The focus in 1995 was on the changing Arctic landscape and pollution. In 2001 it was worldwide action on long-range transport of air pollution. 2010's focus was One Atmosphere.

== Awards ==
In collaboration with the International Academy of Science, Munich the Union offers the Thomas Kuhn Award for a new understanding of problems of sustainability or the applied transfer of such new solutions and the Yuan T. Lee Award for multi-disciplinary or cross-disciplinary work which relates to the natural and psycho-sciences in pursuit of sustainability.

== Publications ==
- Ranjeet Sokhi (ED.): World Atlas of Atmospheric Pollution. The World Atlas was developed in conjunction with the International Union of Air Pollution Prevention and Environmental Protection Associations (IUAPPA) and the Global Atmospheric Pollution Forum.
- IUAPPA Three Year Review: 2007 - 2010 (PDF)
- Over 1000 IUAPPA related publications (Google scholar).
