= KEPCO Nuclear Fuel =

South Korean nuclear fuel company

KEPCO Nuclear Fuel Company 한전원자력연료주식회사
- Company type: Public
- Industry: Nuclear power
- Founded: 1982
- Headquarters: Yuseong-gu, Daejeon, South Korea
- Products: Nuclear fuel

Korean name
- Hangul: 한전원자력연료
- Hanja: 韓電原子力燃料
- Revised Romanization: Hanjeon Wonjaryeok Yeollyo
- McCune–Reischauer: Hanjŏn Wŏnjaryŏk Yŏllyo
- Website: www.knfc.co.kr

KEPCO Nuclear Fuel (KEPCO NF) is a South Korean public enterprise established in 1982. It provides nuclear fuels to 24 nuclear power plants in South Korea. The price of the nuclear fuel provided by the company accounts for 60% of the average international price.

== See also ==
- KEPCO E&C
- KEPCO
- Korea Atomic Energy Research Institute
