= Korea Atomic Energy Research Institute =

Public research institute in South Korea

- 한국원자력연구원
- Formation: February 3, 1959
- Type: Governmental organisation
- Headquarters: Daejeon, South Korea
- Budget: 534.5 billion KRW
- Staff: 1,431
- Website: www.kaeri.re.kr/eng

- Korea Atomic Energy Research Institute
- Hangul: 한국원자력연구원
- Hanja: 韓國原子力硏究院
- RR: Hanguk wonjaryeok yeonguwon
- MR: Han'guk wŏnjaryŏk yŏn'guwŏn

The Korea Atomic Energy Research Institute (KAERI; Korean: 한국원자력연구원) in Daejeon, South Korea was established in 1959 as the sole professional research-oriented institute for nuclear power in South Korea, and has rapidly built a reputation for research and development in various fields.

== History ==
KAERI was established in 1959 as the Atomic Energy Research Institute (national research institute).

=== Spin off companies and institutions ===
KAERI has made significant contributions to the nation's nuclear technology development. After Korea achieved self-reliance in nuclear core technologies, KAERI have transferred highly developed technologies to local industries for practical applications.

- The Korea Institute of Nuclear Safety (KINS), responsible for supporting the government in regulatory and licensing works, and the Nuclear Environment Technology Institute, responsible for low and medium level radioactive waste management, are also originally spin-offs from KAERI.
- KAERI established the present KEPCO E&C (full name: KEPCO Engineering & Construction Company, INC., formerly: KOPEC), responsible for not only the architect engineering works of nuclear power plants, but also for designing nuclear steam supply systems.
- KAERI also established the present Korea Nuclear Fuel Co., Ltd. (KNFC), responsible for designing and manufacturing PWR as well as PHWR fuels.
- In 2004 the Korea Institute of Nuclear Nonproliferation and Control was spun out of KAERI.

=== KAERI developed chad commercialized technologies ===
- In 1995 KAERI designed and constructed the nation's first multipurpose research reactor, HANARO based on the Canadian MAPLE design.. Reactor based on this design exported to Jordan as Jordan Research and Training Reactor (JRTR).
- KAERI is dedicated to finding a wide range of uses for atomic energy. As examples, KAERI developed the world's first radiopharmaceutical "Milican injection" for treating liver cancer.
- The System-Integrated Modular Advanced Reactor (SMART).

== See also ==
- Korea University of Science and Technology
- Korea Institute of Nuclear Safety (KINS)
- KEPCO E&C
- Korea Nuclear Fuel Co., Ltd. (KNFC)
- Daedeok Innopolis
