= High-Flux Advanced Neutron Application Reactor =

Research reactor in Daejeon, South Korea

HANARO (High-Flux Advanced Neutron Application Reactor)
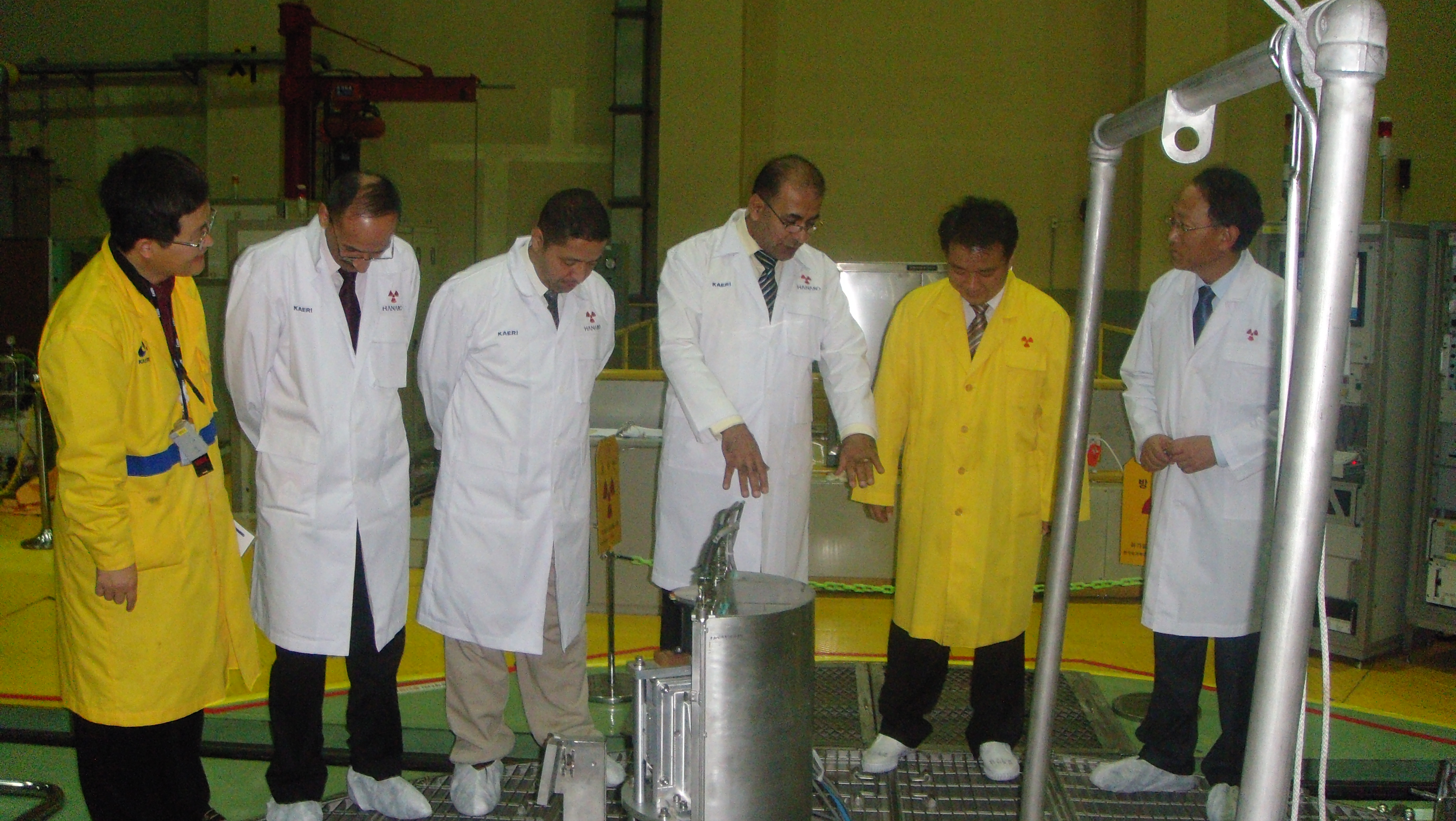
- On top of the reactor, 2009

- Location within South Korea
- Operating institution: Korea Atomic Energy Research Institute
- Location: Daejeon, Republic of Korea
- Coordinates: 36°25′26″N 127°22′13″E
- Type: open tank in pool, Multi-purpose research reactor.
- Power: 30 MW (thermal)

Construction and upkeep
- Construction began: 1990
- Time to construct: 4 years
- First criticality: April-1995

Technical specifications
- Max thermal flux: 4.4 × 10^{14} n/cm^{2} /sec
- Max fast flux: 2.1 × 10^{14} n/cm^{2} /sec
- Fuel type: U_{3}Si, 19.75% Enriched Uranium. (36 Hexagonal + 18 cylindricalx)
- Cooling: Light water
- Neutron reflector: Heavy water
- Control rods: Hafnium

The High-Flux Advanced Neutron Application Reactor (HANARO; Korean: 하나로) is a 30 MW multi-purpose research reactor located at Daejeon, Republic of Korea. It was designed by Korea Atomic Energy Research Institute (KAERI) as a facility for research and development on the neutron science and its applications.

HANARO has been playing a significant role as a national facility in the area of neutron science, the production of key radioisotopes, material testing for power reactor application, neutron transmutation doping (NTD), neutron activation analysis, and neutron radiography. After the installation of a cold neutron source in 2010, it has been also serving as a regional and international facility for neutron science.
