= Korea Basic Science Institute =

Korean government-funded research institute

- 한국기초과학지원연구원
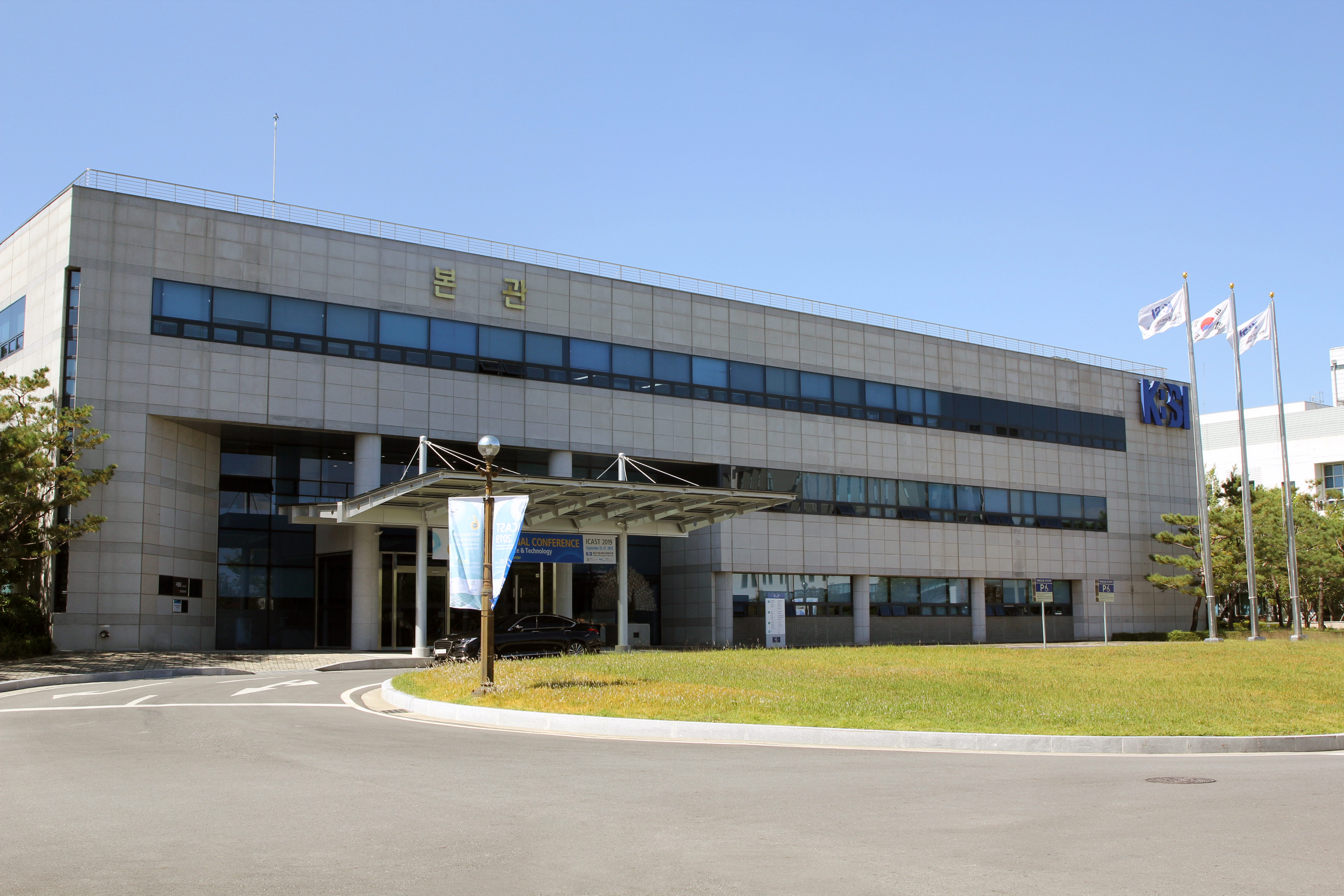
- Formation: August 1, 1988
- Type: Governmental organisation
- Purpose: Basic science research
- Headquarters: Daejeon, South Korea
- Location: Gwahak-ro 169-148, Yuseong-gu, Daejeon, South Korea
- Coordinates: 36.373°N 127.351°E
- President: Yang Sung-kwang
- Staff: 385 (2019.9)
- Website: www.kbsi.re.kr

- Korea Basic Science Institute
- Hangul: 한국기초과학지원연구원
- Hanja: 韓國基礎科學支援硏究院
- RR: Hanguk gicho gwahak jiwon yeonguwon
- MR: Han'guk kich'o kwahak chiwŏn yŏn'guwŏn

The Korea Basic Science Institute (KBSI; Korean: 한국기초과학지원연구원) is a Korean government-funded research institute that conducts basic science research and relevant pure basic research. KBSI was established in August 1988 as a research institute under the National Research Council of Science and Technology of Korea. Headquarters are located in Daejeon and Cheongju while nine regional centers are located in eight domestic cities.

== KBSI presidents ==
- Kim Hyeonnam (김현남), 1988–1991
- Kang Bakgwang (강박광), 1991–1993
- Bak Byeonggwon (박병권), 1993–1994
- Choe Deokin (최덕인), 1995–1998
- Lee Jeongsun (이정순), 1998–2005 (KBSI cites Lee as 5th and 6th presidency)
- Kang Sinwon (강신원), 2005–2008
- Park Juntaek (박준택), 2008–2012 (KBSI cites Park as 8th and 9th presidency)
- Chung Kwang Hwa (정광화), 2013–2016
- Lee Kwang Sik (이광식), 2016–2019
- Shin Hyung-Shik (신형식), 2019–2023
- Yang Sung-kwang (양성광), 2023-current
