= Korea Institute of Nuclear Safety =

South Korean nuclear expert organization

- 한국원자력안전기술원
- Formation: 1990
- Type: Governmental organisation
- Headquarters: Daejeon, South Korea
- President: Sok Chul Kim
- Website: www.kins.re.kr/english

- Korea Institute of Nuclear Safety
- Hangul: 한국원자력안전기술원
- Hanja: 韓國原子力安全技術院
- RR: Hanguk wonjaryeok anjeon gisurwon
- MR: Han'guk wŏnjaryŏk anjŏn kisurwŏn

The Korea Institute of Nuclear Safety (KINS; Korean: 한국원자력안전기술원) is a government-funded technical expert organization in Daejeon, South Korea, which aims to develop and implement regulations for nuclear safety.

KINS was established in February 1990, and supports the Nuclear Safety and Security Commission in technical aspects of nuclear safety regulation; "including safety reviews, inspections, education, and safety research, based on technical knowledge and accumulated regulatory experience."

The current president of KINS is Sok Chul Kim. As of June 2016, KINS consists of two offices, eight divisions, and 44 departments/teams with 523 persons.

In 2008, in collaboration with the International Atomic Energy Agency (IAEA), KINS established the International Nuclear Safety School, an initiative intended to promote knowledge-sharing and professional training in the field of nuclear safety and nuclear security.

== See also ==
- Nuclear power in South Korea
