= Korea Research Institute of Standards and Science =

South Korean standards organization

- 한국표준과학연구원

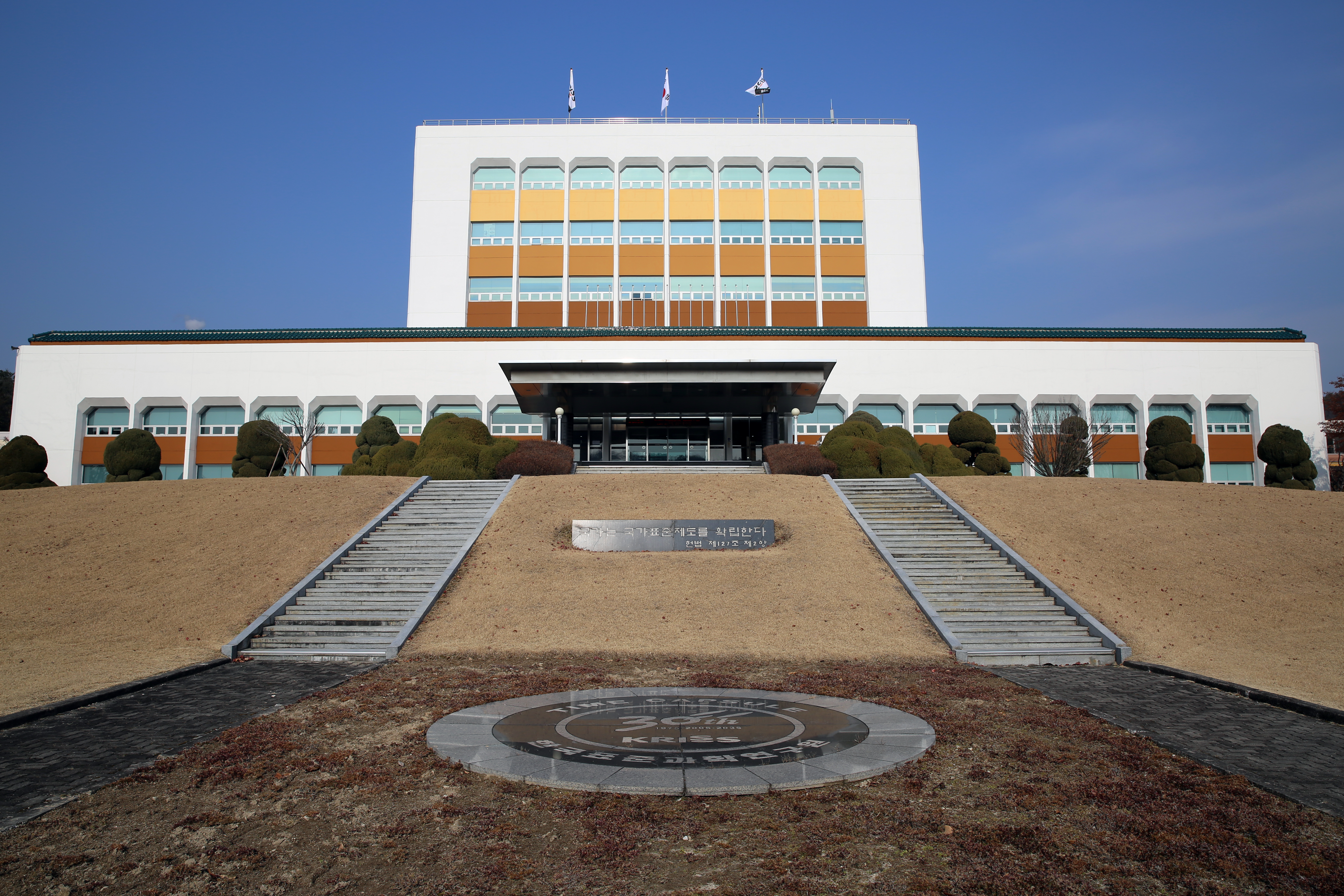
- Formation: 1975
- Location: Yuseong District, Daejeon, South Korea
- Budget: US$ 108 million (2011)
- Staff: 410 (2012)
- Website: Korea Research Institute of Standards and Science

Korean name
- Hangul: 한국표준과학연구원
- Hanja: 韓國標準科學硏究院
- RR: Hanguk pyojun gwahak yeonguwon
- MR: Han'guk p'yojun kwahak yŏn'guwŏn

The Korea Research Institute of Standards and Science (KRISS; Korean: 한국표준과학연구원) is the national measurement standards laboratory for the Republic of Korea. It is a government-funded institute responsible for providing national measurement standards and advancing measurement technologies. KRISS is also an active member of the General Conference on Weights and Measures (CGPM).

== History ==
KRISS was established in 1975 as the Korea Standards Research Institute, and initiated calibration services in 1979. The institute became known as the Korea Research Institute of Standards and Science in 1991.

In 1999, KRISS was officially designated to serve as the national metrology institute by the Framework Act on National Standards (Article 13). It maintains South Korea's primary measurement standards. The first woman to head the organization was Kwang Hwa Chung, who became president in 2005 and served through 2008.

== See also ==
- HLA (radio station), time signal broadcast by KRISS
- Metrology
