= Korean Vacuum Society =

South Korean academic organization

- Formation: September 10, 1991; 35 years ago
- Headquarters: Samseong-dong, Daejong Building, #710 435 Teheran-ro, Gangnam District, Seoul, South Korea
- Coordinates: 37.5066225°N 127.0544959°E
- Members: 4,000
- President: Bu Jinhyo
- Website: www.kvs.or.kr

- Korean Vacuum Society
- Hangul: 한국진공학회
- Hanja: 韓國眞空學會
- RR: Hanguk jingong hakhoe
- MR: Han'guk chin'gong hakhoe

The Korean Vacuum Society (KMS; Korean: 한국진공학회) is an academic organization in South Korea incorporated under the Ministry of Science and ICT. Their work aims to support semiconductor, IT, and display industries. The publish the English language journal Applied Science and Convergence Technology (ASCT) and the Korean-language journal 진공 이야기 or Vacuum Magazine and hold regular summer and winter conferences. Their six departments include vacuum technology, surface and interface science, semiconductor and thin film, plasma and displays, nanoscience and bio-interface, and energy technology.

== Applied Science and Convergence Technology ==
The Society first launched a quarterly journal in 1992 named Journal of the Korean Vacuum Society. From 2006, it was published bimonthly. Eight years later it changed into the online open access journal Applied Science and Convergence Technology and comes out six times a year.

== KVS presidents ==
- Park Dongsu (1991–1997) KVS cites Park as 1st to 3rd presidency
- Kim Yeonggi (1997–1999)
- U Jongcheon (1999–2001)
- Lee Sunbo (2001–2003)
- Son Gisu (2003–2005)
- Chung Kwang Hwa (2005–2007)
- Choi Chigyu (2007–2009)
- Lee Jihwa (2009–2011)
- Bak Jongyun (2011–2013)
- Noh Samgyu (2013–2015)
- Kang Huijae (2015–2017)
- Kim Eungyu (2017–2019)
- Yeom Geunyeong (2019–2021)
- Choi Eunha (2021–2023)
- Bu Jinhyo (2023–current)

== See also ==
- American Vacuum Society
- International Union for Vacuum Science, Technique and Applications
