= Electronics and Telecommunications Research Institute =

Research institute in Daejeon, South Korea

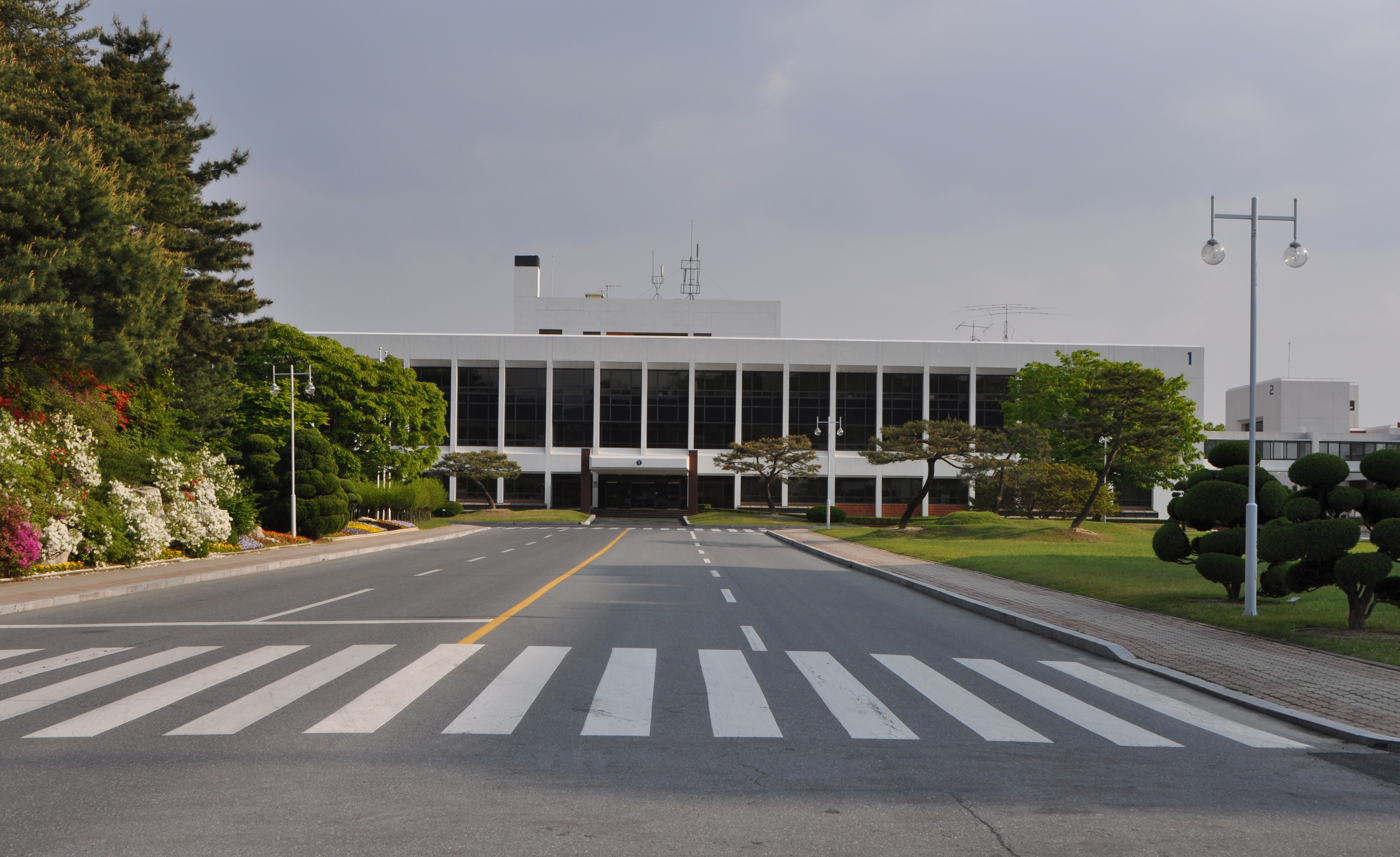
ETRI, Korea

The Electronics and Telecommunications Research Institute (Korean: 한국전자통신연구원; Hanja: 韓國電子通信硏究院) is a Korean government-funded research institution in Daedeok Science Town in Daejeon, South Korea.

== Overview ==
Established in 1976, ETRI is a non-profit government-funded research institute. In the 1980s, ETRI developed TDX (Time Division Exchange) and 4M DRAM (Dynamic Random Access Memory). In the 1990s, ETRI commercialized Code-division multiple access. In the 2000s, ETRI developed Terrestrial DMB, WiBro, and 4G LTE Advanced, for mobile communications.

ETRI is one of the leading research institutes in the wireless communication domain with more than 2,500 patents filed.

ETRI developed ship-area network technology, portable automatic language interpretation, and automated valet parking technology. As of December 14, 2015, ETRI had about 2,000 employees of which about 1,800 are researchers.

== Chronology ==
Period	Changes
2013.03.	Affiliation changed from MKE to MSIP
2008.02.	Affiliation changed from MOST to MKE
2004.10.	Affiliation of MOST (Korean Ministry of Science and Technology) Changed
2000.01.	National Security Research Institute Established an Affiliated of ETRI
1999.01.	Affiliation Changed to KOCI of Office of the Prime Minister
1997.01.	The Institute's Korean Title Changed
1996.04.	SERI Incorporated into ETRI as an Affiliate
1992.03.	Affiliation of ETRI Changed (from MOST to MIC)
1985.03.	ETRI Established (MOST, Consolidation of KIET and KETRI)
1981.01.	KETRI Established (MOST)
1980.12.	Affiliation of KTRI Changed (from MIC to MOST)
1977.12.	KTRI Established (MIC)
1976.12.	KIET, KERTI (the origins of ETRI) Established

== Awards ==
- Ho-Am Prize in Science in 1991
