= Lee Young-hee (physicist) =

South Korean physicist

Lee Young Hee
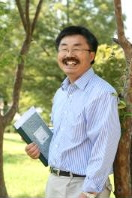
- Born: 28 July 1955 (age 71); Gimje, South Korea
- Education: Kent State University
- Awards: 2010: 100 representative researches in all the researches and development done during 2010 in Korea, Ministry of Education, Science and Technology 2008: Presidential Award in Science and Education 2007: Lee Hsun Research Award, IMR, Chinese Academy of Science, China 2005: Nominated as "The National Scholar" by Ministry of Education
- Scientific career
- Fields: Department of Physics
- Workplaces: Hubei University of Technology, Sungkyunkwan University, Institute for Basic Science
- Doctoral advisor: Michael A. Lee

Lee Young Hee (born 28 July 1955) is a South Korean physicist. He was a distinguished professor in physics and energy science at Sungkyunkwan University as a SKKU fellow and also director of the Center for Integrated Nanostructure Physics in the Institute for Basic Science (IBS) until 2023, before going to Hubei University of Technology and Peking University. He has been a Clarivate Analytics Highly Cited Researcher in the cross-field category in 2018–2024.

== Education ==
Lee received a B.S. in physics, Chonbuk National University in 1982. In 1986 he received his Ph.D. in physics at Kent State University on the subject of "Classical and Quantum Computer Simulation Studies: Molecular Dynamics of the Kerr Effect in CS2 and Green's Function MonteCarlo Calculation of the Electronic Correlation Energy in Atoms" which was advised by Michael A. Lee.

== Career ==
- 2025–present: professor, School of Materials Science and Engineering, Peking University
- 2024–present: professor and Director of Low-Dimensional Quantum Materials Institute at Hubei University of Technology
- 2023–present: Distinguished HCR professor, Department of Physics, Sungkyunkwan University
- 2012–2023: Director of Center for Integrated Nanostructure Physics, Institute for Basic Science
- 2021–present: Chinese Academy of Sciences, China, Academician
- 2009–2023: Professor in energy science, Sungkyunkwan University
- 2007–Present: Korean Academy of Science and Technology (KAST), member
- 2001–Present: Professor in physics, Sungkyunkwan University, SKKU fellow
- 1996–1997: Visiting professor in physics, Michigan State University, United States
- 1993–1993: Visiting researcher, Zurich IBM Research Center, Switzerland
- 1989–1990: Visiting professor in physics, Iowa State University Ames National Laboratory, United States
- 1987–2001: Assistant Professor, full professor in physics, Chonbuk National University

== Awards ==
- 2020: Seongbong Physics Award from the Korean Physical Society
- Nov. 2019: Kyung-Ahm Prize in Natural Science, Kyung-Ahm Education & Cultural Foundation
- May 2017: Einstein Award, Chinese Academy of Sciences
- May 2014: Sudang Award
- December 2012: Grand Prize for Sungkyun Family (Educational Achievements Parts), Sungkyunkwan University
- December 2010: 100 representative researches in all the researches and development done during 2010 in Korea, Ministry of Education, Science and Technology
- October 2010: 100 representative research achievements in the R&D of Ministry of Education, Science and Technology
- May 2008 Presidential Award in Science and Education
- December 2007: Lee Hsun Research Award, IMR, Chinese Academy of Science, China
- April 2005: Nominated as "Representative Research achievement of BK21 (’01.03~’05.12)", "Modification of electronic structures of a arbonnanotube by hydrogen functionalization"
- May 1997: Award from Foundation of Korea Science and Technology for "The Best Paper in Physics " Fellowship and Nominations
- June 1997: Nominated as "Man of Jeonbuk National University" in Science in 50th Anniversary of Jeonbuk National University
- September 1999: Nominated for "Man of Jeollabuk-do Province", in Academia and Public press
- September 2004: First Fellow of Sungkyunkwan University
- April 2005: Science Award from Korean Physical Society
- September 2007: Fellow of Sungkyunkwan University

== Sources ==
- 2013: 'Transferred wrinkled Al2O3 for highly stretchable and transparent graphene/carbon nanotube transistors', Nature Materials 12(5), 403-409 (May, 2013) - " KBS News 9 Boardcating/Mar.04,2013 "
- 2012: 'Probing graphene grain boundaries with optical microscopy', Nature, 490(7419), 235-239 - " KBS News Boardcating "
- 2011: "Transparent, Flexible graphene / CNT transistor and non-volitive memory devices" - Selected as a Highlight in Nano Letters(11, 1344)- Selected for Cover page in Advanced Materias (23, 1899)
- 2009: "Adaptive Logic Circuits with Doping-Free Ambipolar Carbon Nanotube Transistors" NanoLetters, 99(4), 1401 Highlighted by Nature Publishing Group, Asia Materials - Appeared in public newspapers (Asia Economy Daily, etnews, fnnews etc.)
- 2009: "Reduction-Controlled Viologen in Bisolvent as an Environmentally Stable n-Type Dopant for Carbon Nanotubes" J. Am. Chem. Soc. (131, 327), - Appeared in newspapers (MK, etnews etc.)
- 2008: Industrialization of A/CNT composites - SBS Moring Wide, MBN News - Appeared in newspapers (Chosun, etnews, Hankyung etc.)
- 2007: Superb electroreactive CNT clusters - Nano Letters, 7(8), 2178 - KBS News 1TV
- 2006: Nominated as "Representative research achievement in the Basic Research of Korea Science and Engineering Foundation " - Control of the Electronic Structures of Carbon Nanotubes
- 2005: Separation of semiconducting carbon nanotubes by nitronium ions - J. Am. Chem. Soc., 127, 5196 - KBS 2TV News - Appeared in newspapers (Donga, Kookmin, etnews etc.)
- 2005: Selected as the best research outcome in "The Final Evaluation of National Research Laboratory of Korea Science and Engineering Foundation"
- 2002: Transforming metallic CNTs to semiconducting CNTs by atomic hydrogen - Selected as Advanced Materials(14, 1818), Inside Cover page - YTN News
- 2001: The best supercapacitor record using SWCNTs (180F/g) - Advanced Materials, 13, 497
- 2000: Vertically aligned carbon nanotubes by microwave PECVD - Applied Physics Letters, 76, 2367
- 1999: The world first development of CNT-FED in collaboration with Samsung - Applied Physics Letters, 75, 3129 (Citation : 1,046) - Nature News
- 1997: Proposing Scooter Motion of catalyst for SWCNT growth - Physical Review Letters, 78, 2393 (Citation : 267 )
- 1996: "Crystalline ropes of Metallic Carbon Nanotubes" - Science, 273, 483 (Citation : 3,838) Scientific Activities

== Other activities ==
- November 2009–Present: Associate Editor of European Physical Journal: Appl. Phys.
- 2000–Present: Associate Editor of Carbon Letters
- 2006–2010: Managing Editor of NANO
- 2009–2010: International Advisory Committee of Nanotube conference
- 2008–Present: Conference chair of SPIE conference (Carbon Nanotubes, Graphene, and Associated Devices III)
- 2012–Present: Conference chair of MRS Meeting
- 2008–Present: Program Committee of IWEPNM
- 2010–Present: Materials Research Society Member
- 2009–Present: Program Committee of Korea Carbon Society
- 2001–Present: The Korean Physical Society Fellow
- 2001–006: Associate Editor of Journal of Nanoscience and Nanotechnology

== Representative papers ==
1. Probing graphene grain boundaries with optical microscopy (Nature, 2012)
2. Transferred wrinkled Al2O3 for highly stretchable and transparent graphene/carbon nanotube transistors (Nature Materials, 2013)
3. Small Hysteresis Nanocarbon-Based Integrated Circuits on Flexible and Transparent Plastic Substrate (Nano Letters, 2011)
4. Adaptive Logic Circuits with Doping-Free Ambipolar Carbon Nanotube Transistors (NanoLetters, 2009)
5. Synthesis of Large-Area Graphene Layers on Poly-Nickel Substrate by Chemical Vapor Deposition: Wrinkle Formation (Advanced Materials, 2009)
