= Je-geun Park =

South Korean physicist (born 1965)

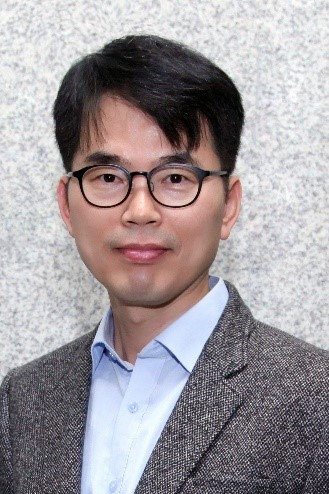
- Born: 14 October 1965 (age 60); Gosung, South Korea
- Education: 1988 Seoul National University, BA; 1990 Seoul National University, MSc; 1993 Imperial College London, PhD
- Known for: Condensed matter physics
- Scientific career
- Institutions: Seoul National University

Je-Geun Park (Korean: 박제근; Hanja: 朴濟根; born 1965) is a physicist in South Korea. He is a condensed matter physicist known for his work on wide-ranging problems of magnetism, in particular strongly correlated electron systems. He is credited with discovering a new class of magnetic 2D materials, also known as van der Waals magnets. He has worked as a professor at Seoul National University.

== Early life and education ==
He was born on October 14, 1965, in Goseong, South Korea. He graduated from Dae-Ah High School in 1984 and attended the Department of Physics at Seoul National University from 1984 to 1988.

After his undergraduate degree, he went on to do his MSc in the group of Professor Se-Jung Oh and worked on core-levels spectroscopy of Mn dihalides and graduated in 1990. He won a national overseas scholarship from the Korean government in 1989 and went to Imperial College, London, to study PhD under Prof. Bryan Coles, FRS. Before returning to Korea, he spent a few years of stints at Lab. Louis Neel, Grenoble, France and Birkbeck College, London.

He worked at Inha University (1996–2001) and Sungkyunkwan University (2001–2010). He moved to Seoul National University as a university professor in 2010 and has since built a world-renowned group with pioneering works on van der Waals magnets. He is currently a professor at the Department of Physics and Astronomy of Seoul National University.

== Academic career ==
Je-Geun Park worked at the Institut Néel in Grenoble, France, and at Birkbeck College, London, as a post-doc after getting his PhD from Imperial College, London, in 1993. He then returned to Korea to take up an assistant professor position at Inha University from 1996 to 2000, and was promoted to associate professor in 2001. He then worked as an associate professor at SungKyunKwan University from 2001 to 2006 before becoming a professor from 2006 to 2009 and SKKU fellow from 2009 to 2010. He later moved to Seoul National University in 2010 as a professor. He is currently a director at the Center for Quantum Materials in SNU.

== Awards ==
- 1989 – The Korean Government National Scholarship
- 1995 – Rosalind Franklin Prize, Birkbeck College, London
- 2007 – LG Yonam Fellowship
- 2015 – The 2015 Academic Award, the Korean Physical Society
- 2016 – The Korea Science Award
- 2017 – Member, the Korean Academy of Science and Technology
- 2023 – The POSCO TJ Park Science Award

== Patents ==
Je-Geun Park's patents include:

- Probe System For Low-Temperature High-Precision Heat Transport Measurement And Measurement Device Including Same, registered in 2022
- Magnetic Memory Using Spin Current, Operating Method Thereof, And Electronic Apparatus Including Magnetic Memory, registered in 2023.

== Publications ==
- 1992 – Origin of 3s splitting in the photoemission spectra of Mn and Fe insulating Compounds
- 2006 – Spin gap in Tl2Ru2O7 and the possible formation of Haldane chains in three-dimensional crystals
- 2008 – Giant magneto-elastic coupling in multiferroic hexagonal manganites
- 2012 – Spin wave measurements over the full Brillouin zone of multiferroic BiFeO3
- 2013 – Magnon breakdown in a two dimensional triangular lattice Heisenberg antiferromagnet of multiferroic LuMnO3
- 2016 – Ising-Type Magnetic Ordering in Atomically Thin FePS_{3}
- 2016 – Spontaneous decays of magneto-elastic excitations in noncollinear antiferromagnet (Y,Lu)MnO_{3}
- 2018 – Magnetism in two-dimensional van der Waals materials
- 2018 – Charge-spin correlation and self-doped ground state in van der Waals antiferromagnet NiPS_{3}
- 2019 – Suppression of magnetic ordering in XXZ-type antiferromagnetic monolayer NiPS_{3}
- 2020 – Gigantic current control of coercive field and magnetic memory based on nanometer-thin ferromagnetic van der Waals Fe_{3}GeTe_{2}
- 2020 – Momentum-dependent magnon lifetime in the metallic noncollinear triangular antiferromagnet CrB_{2}
- 2020 – Coherent many-body exciton in van der Waals antiferromagnet NiPS_{3}
- 2021 – Spin texture induced by nonmagnetic doping and spin dynamics in 2D triangular lattice antiferromagnet h-Y(Mn,Al)O-3
- 2021 – Possible persistence of multiferroic order down to bilayer limit of van der Waals material NiI_{2}
- 2021 – Sizable suppression of thermal Hall effect upon isotopic substitution in SrTiO_{3}
- 2021 – Giant modulation of optical nonlinearity by Floquet engineering
- 2022 – Multiferroic-Enabled Magnetic-Excitons in 2D Quantum-Entangled Van der Waals Antiferromagnet NiI_{2}
