= Nam Chang-hee =

South Korean plasma physicist (born 1957)

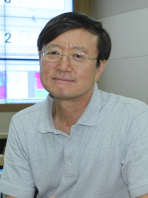
- Born: 14 February 1957; Gwangju, South Korea
- Education: Seoul National University; KAIST; Princeton University
- Known for: Femtosecond laser and attophysics
- Scientific career
- Fields: Plasma physics
- Workplaces: Institute for Basic Science; Gwangju Institute of Science and Technology; KAIST; Princeton Plasma Physics Laboratory; Pusan National University
- Doctoral advisor: S. Suckewer
- Website: https://corels.ibs.re.kr

- Nam Chang-hee
- Hangul: 남창희
- RR: Nam Changhui
- MR: Nam Ch'anghŭi

Nam Chang-hee (Korean: 남창희; born February 14, 1957) is a South Korean plasma physicist. Nam is specializing in the exploration of relativistic laser-matter interactions using femtosecond PW lasers. Currently he is professor of physics at Gwangju Institute of Science and Technology and director of the Center for Relativistic Laser Science as a part of the Institute for Basic Science (IBS).

== Biography ==
Nam studied nuclear engineering at Seoul National University, where he obtained his B.Sc. in 1977. After that he received a M.Sc. in physics from the Korea Advanced Institute of Science and Technology (KAIST) in 1979. Entering the classroom as an instructor, he taught at Pusan National University until 1982. Enrolling at Princeton University, he moved to the United States, where he later received a Ph.D. in plasma physics in 1988. He stayed in Princeton for a year working as a staff research physicist at the Princeton Plasma Physics Laboratory.

In 1989, he began working as an assistant professor in the Department of Physics in KAIST, where he was promoted to associate professor in 1992 and full professor in 1998. From 1999, he was also director of the Coherent X-ray Research Center at KAIST where he researched ultrafast laser science. He left KAIST in 2012 to become a professor at the Department of Physics and Photon Science at Gwangju Institute of Science and Technology (GIST) and the founding director of the Center for Relativistic Laser Science, a research center at GIST with funding provided by the Institute for Basic Science.

== Academic work ==
Nam has published more than 120 journal papers and gives invited talks in international conferences. He served as a steering committee member of OECD Global Science Forum on Compact High-Intensity Short-Pulse Lasers (2001-2003) that eventually became ICUIL (Int. Comm. on Ultra-high Intensity Lasers) - a working group of IUPAP, and is a scientific advisory committee member of ELI - ALPS (Extreme Light Infrastructure/ Attosecond Light Pulse Source) – the EU program for the PW laser facility in Hungary started from 2011.

He has served as conference chairs (ICXRL in 2010, ISUILS in 2012), organizing chairs (APLS in 2008, 2010, 2012) or program chairs (CLEO-Pacific Rim in 2007, 2009). He is on the editorial boards of J. Phys. B as an international advisory committee member since 2007 and as a guest editor in 2012; IEEE Photonics Journal as an associate editor (from 2009 to 2011). He has represented Korea in international committees (ICQE from 2005 to 2012; CLEO-PR from 2012; Commission on Quantum Electronics of IUPAP since 2008). He has been instrumental in launching the Asian Intense Laser Network in 2004, serving as the first secretary

== Awards ==
- 2025: ISUILS Medal, International Symposium on Ultrafast Intense Laser Science (ISUILS 2025)
- 2020: Presidential Citation, Government Science Day Award, Ministry of Science and ICT
- 2011: Sungdo Optical Science Award of the Optical Society Korea
- 2010: National Academy of Sciences Award, Korea
- 2009: Fellow of the Optical Society of America
- 2008: Fellow of the American Physical Society
- 2002: Scientist of the Month, Ministry of Science and ICT and National Research Foundation of Korea
