= Sudang Award =

Academic award of South Korea

- Date: October 5, 1973
- Country: South Korea
- Presented by: Sudang Foundation
- Rewards: KRW 200 million and plaque
- First award: 1973
- Website: Sudang Foundation

- Sudang Award
- Hangul: 수당상
- Hanja: 수당賞
- RR: Sudangsang
- MR: Sudangsang

The Sudang Award (Korean: 수당상) is an academic prize meant to honor the achievements of researchers and contribute to the development of technology and academics by awarding awards basic science, applied science, humanities and social sciences, and formerly natural science. The award is presented by the Sudang Foundation which is under Samyang Group. Laureates receive KRW 200 million and plaque as part of the award.

== Laureates ==
| Year | Laureates | | | |
|---|---|---|---|---|
| 1973 | Lee Taegyu (이태규); Korea Advanced Institute of Science | | | |
| 1974 | Lee Huijun (이희준); Joseonjeoneop | | | |
| 1975 | Ahn Donghyeok (안동혁); Haksurwon | | | |
| 1976 | Yun Il-seon (윤일선); Seoul National University | | | |
| 1977 | Jo Baekhyeon (조백현); Seoul National University | | | |
| 1978 | Jeong Mungi (정문기); Haksurwon | | | |
| 1979 | Choe Gyunam (최규남); Ministry of Ministry of Education | | | |
| 1980 | Kim Dujong (김두종); Haksurwon | | | |
| 1981 | Bak Donggil (박동길); Haksurwon | | | |
| 1982 | Hyeon Singyu (현신규); Seoul National University | | | |
| 1983 | Kim Dongik (김동익); Seoul National University | | | |
| 1984 | Na Sejin (나세진); Seoul National University | | | |
| 1985 | Lee Yongseol (이용설); Severance Hospital | | | |
| 1986 | Jeong Guchung (정구충); Politician | | | |
| Year | Basic Science | Applied Science | Humanities and Social Sciences | Natural Science |
| 2006 | – | – | Yun Seokcheol (윤석철); Hanyang University | Jin Jeongil (진정일); Korea University |
| 2007 | – | – | Han Yeongu (한영우); Hallym University | Lee Hyeongu (이현구); Seoul National University |
| 2008 | Ahn Jinheung (안진흥); Pohang University of Science and Technology | Han Songyeop (한송엽); Seoul National University | Jeong Jinhong (정진홍); Ewha Womans University | – |
| 2009 | Myeong Hyocheol (명효철); Korea Institute for Advanced Study | Hyeon Jaecheon (현재천); Korea University | Lee Gidong (이기동); Dongguk University | – |
| 2010 | Bak Sumun (박수문); Ulsan National Institute of Science and Technology | Lee Myeonggeol (이명걸); Seoul National University | Bak Yeongcheol (박영철); Korea University | – |
| 2011 | Kim Doochul (김두철); Korea Institute for Advanced Study | Lee Honghui (이홍희); Seoul National University | Kim Yunsik (김윤식); Seoul National University | – |
| 2012 | Kim Myeongsu (김명수); Seoul National University | Byeon Jeungnam (변증남); Ulsan National Institute of Science and Technology | Hong Wontak (홍원탁); Seoul National University | – |
| 2013 | Kim Gyeongryeol (김경렬); Seoul National University | Lee Jeongyong (이정용); KAIST | Bak Wonho (박원호); Korea University | – |
| 2014 | Lee Young-hee (이영희); Sungkyunkwan University | Seong Hyeongjin (성형진); KAIST | Yun Sasun (윤사순); Korea University | – |
| 2015 | Jeong Jinha (정진하); Seoul National University | Je Jeongho (제정호); KAIST | Seo Daeseok (서대석); Seoul National University | – |
| 2016 | Jo Bongrae (조봉래); Daejin University | Bak Suyeong (박수영); Seoul National University | Jeong Gijun (정기준); Seoul National University | – |
| 2017 | Lee Yeongjo (이영조); Seoul National University | Choe Jeongu (최정우); Sogang University | Hong Yunpyo (홍윤표); Yonsei University | – |
| 2018 | Choe Uiju (최의주); Korea University | Lee Byeongho (이병호); Seoul National University | Im Hyeonjin (임현진); Seoul National University | – |
| 2019 | Lee Hyeong Mok (이형목); Seoul National University and Korea Astronomy and Space Science Institute | Kwon Ikchan (권익찬); Korea Institute of Science and Technology | Lee Taejin (이태진); Seoul National University | – |
| 2020 | Kim Dongho (김동호); Yonsei University | Choe Haecheon (최해천); Seoul National University | Lee Hangu (이한구); Kyung Hee University | – |
| 2021 | – | Kim Jangju (김장주); Seoul National University Seong Yeongeun (성영은); Seoul National University | – | – |
| 2022 | – | Lee Seonghwan (이성환); Korea University | Oh Saenggeun (오생근); Seoul National University | – |
| 2023 | Ahn Jihun (안지훈); Korea University | Kim Gihyeon (김기현); Hanyang University | – | – |
| 2024 | Lee Hyeonu (이현우); Pohang University of Science and Technology | Cho Gilwon (조길원); Pohang University of Science and Technology | – | – |
| 2025 | Lee Hyocheol (이효철); KAIST | Lee Junghui (이중희); Jeonbuk National University | – | – |

== See also ==
- Kyung-Ahm Prize
- Korea Science Award
- Hansung Science Award
