= Zhou Ji =

Zhou Ji, may refer to:

- Zhou Ji (Tang dynasty), Chinese warlord of the late Tang dynasty (618–907)
- Zhou Ji (politician, born 1946), Chinese mechanical engineer and politician, academician of the Chinese Academy of Engineering (elected 1999)
- Zhou Ji (engineer) (born 1962), Chinese engineer and professor at Tsinghua University, academician of the Chinese Academy of Engineering (elected 2017)
- Zhou Ji (politician, born 1964), director of the Hong Kong Liaison Office
