= Hansung Science Award =

Academic award of South Korea

- Country: South Korea
- Presented by: Hansung Son Jae-han Scholarship Foundation
- Rewards: KRW 50 million and plaque
- First award: 2018
- Website: Hansung Son Jae-han Scholarship Foundation

Korean name
- Hangul: 한성과학상
- Hanja: 한성科學賞
- RR: Hanseonggwahaksang
- MR: Hansŏnggwahaksang

The Hansung Science Award (Korean: 한성과학상) is a science award in South Korea given to promising young scientists with a goal to produce domestic Nobel Prize winners. Laureates receive KRW 50 million and a plaque as part of the award.

== Laureates ==
	Physics	Chemistry	Life sciences
2018	Bak Honggyu (박홍규); Korea University	Lee Gangtaek (이강택); Gwangju Institute of Science and Technology	Lee Seokyong (이석용); Duke University
2019	Min Beomgi (민범기); KAIST	Han Sungyu (한순규); KAIST	Lee Seungjae (이승재); KAIST
2020	Yang Bohm-Jung (양범정); Seoul National University	Bak Jeongwon (박정원); Seoul National University	Ju Cheolmin (주철민); Delft University of Technology
2021	Kim Geunsu (김근수); Yonsei University	Jeong Yuseong (정유성); KAIST	Ji Seonguk (지성욱); Korea University
2022	Kim Junseong (김준성); Pohang University of Science and Technology	Jo Seunghwan (조승환); Pohang University of Science and Technology	Kim Seongyeon (김성연); Seoul National University
2023	Ha Jeongwan (하정완); Microsoft	Choe Taerim (최태림); ETH Zurich	Ju Yeongseok (주영석); KAIST Graduate School of Medical Science
2024	Lee Gilho (이길호); Pohang University of Science and Technology	Im Mihui (임미희); KAIST	Lee Junhui (이준희); University of Michigan
2025	Jo Gyu-Boong (조규붕); Rice University	Kim Beomjun (김범준); KAIST	Shim Jiwon (심지원); Seoul National University

== See also ==
- Sudang Award
- Korea Science Award
