= Jun-Muk Hwang =

South Korean mathematician (born 1963)

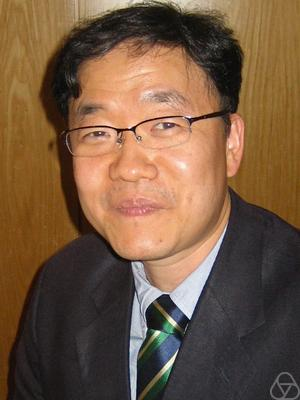
- Born: 1963 (age 62–63); Seoul, South Korea
- Education: Seoul National University; Harvard University
- Awards: National Scientist of the Republic of Korea (2010), Ho-Am Prize in Science (2009), Korea Science Award (2001)
- Scientific career
- Fields: Algebraic geometry, complex differential geometry, complex analysis
- Workplaces: Institute for Basic Science, Korea Institute for Advanced Study, Seoul National University, Mathematical Sciences Research Institute, University of Notre Dame
- Thesis: Global Nondeformability of the Complex Hyperquadric (1993)
- Doctoral advisor: Yum-Tong Siu

Korean name
- Hangul: 황준묵
- Hanja: 黃準默
- RR: Hwang Junmuk
- MR: Hwang Chunmuk
- Website: Center for Complex Geometry

Jun-Muk Hwang (Korean: 황준묵; born 27 October 1963) is a South Korean mathematician, specializing in algebraic geometry and complex differential geometry.

== Personal life ==
Hwang is the eldest son of gayageum musician Hwang Byungki and novelist Han Malsook.

== Education and career ==
Hwang studied physics at Seoul National University for his bachelors before studying physics at Harvard University. In 1993, he completed his PhD under the direction of Yum-Tong Siu with thesis Global nondeformability of the complex hyper quadric. In the following years he held positions at the University of Notre Dame, the Mathematical Sciences Research Institute, and Seoul National University. Since 1999, he was a professor at the Korea Institute for Advanced Study. He was in 2006 an invited speaker with talk Rigidity of rational homogeneous spaces at the International Congress of Mathematicians (ICM) in Madrid and in 2014 a plenary speaker with talk Mori geometry meets Cartan geometry: Varieties of minimal rational tangents at the ICM in Seoul.

With his collaborator Ngaiming Mok, he has developed the theory of varieties of minimal rational tangents, which combines methods of algebraic geometry and differential geometry in the study of rational curves on algebraic varieties. He has applied this theory to settle a number of problems on algebraic varieties covered by rational curves.

In 2020, he was the founding director of the Center for Complex Geometry at the Institute for Basic Science. In 2023, he was selected to be on the committee for the Abel Prize.

== Awards and honors ==
- 2021: National Academy of Sciences Award, National Academy of Sciences, South Korea
- 2012: Fellow, American Mathematical Society
- 2010: National Scientist of the Republic of Korea, Ministry of Education, Science and Technology
- 2009: Ho-Am Prize in Science, Am Prize, The Ho Am Foundation
- 2007: Fellow, Korean Academy of Science and Technology
- 2006: Top Scientist and Technologist Award of Korea, Korean Federation of Science and Technology Societies
- 2006: Scientist of the Year Award, Korean National Assembly
- 2001: Korea Science Award, Ministry of Science and Technology
- 2000: Award for Excellent Article, Korean Mathematical Society

== Selected publications ==
- Hwang, Jun-Muk (1995). "Nondeformability of the complex hyperquadric". Inventiones Mathematicae. 120 (1). Springer Science and Business Media LLC: 317–338. Bibcode:1995InMat.120..317H. doi:10.1007/bf01241131. ISSN 0020-9910. S2CID 120966973.
- "Uniruled projective manifolds with irreducible reductive G-structures". Journal für die reine und angewandte Mathematik (Crelle's Journal). 1997 (491). Walter de Gruyter GmbH: 55–64. 1 September 1997. doi:10.1515/crll.1997.490.55. hdl:10722/75184. ISSN 0075-4102. S2CID 118051384.
- Hwang, Jun-Muk; Mok, Ngaiming (18 February 1998). "Rigidity of irreducible Hermitian symmetric spaces of the compact type under Kähler deformation". Inventiones Mathematicae. 131 (2). Springer Science and Business Media LLC: 393–418. arXiv:math/9604227. Bibcode:1998InMat.131..393H. doi:10.1007/s002220050209. ISSN 0020-9910. S2CID 17138677.
- Hwang, Jun-Muk; Mok, Ngaiming (18 March 1999). "Holomorphic maps from rational homogeneous spaces of Picard number 1 onto projective manifolds". Inventiones Mathematicae. 136 (1). Springer Science and Business Media LLC: 209–231. Bibcode:1999InMat.136..209H. doi:10.1007/s002220050308. hdl:10722/48602. ISSN 0020-9910. S2CID 122937743.
- Hwang, Jun-Muk; Mok, Ngaiming (2003). "Finite morphisms onto Fano manifolds of Picard number 1 which have rational curves with trivial normal bundles". Journal of Algebraic Geometry. 12 (4). American Mathematical Society (AMS): 627–651. doi:10.1090/s1056-3911-03-00319-9. hdl:10722/42125. ISSN 1056-3911. S2CID 56059732.
- HWANG, JUN-MUK; MOK, NGAIMING (2004). "Birationality of the Tangent Map for Minimal Rational Curves". Asian Journal of Mathematics. 8 (1). International Press of Boston: 51–64. arXiv:math/0304101. doi:10.4310/ajm.2004.v8.n1.a6. hdl:10722/75351. ISSN 1093-6106. S2CID 17584597.
- Hwang, Jun-Muk; Mok, Ngaiming (25 February 2005). "Prolongations of infinitesimal linear automorphisms of projective varieties and rigidity of rational homogeneous spaces of Picard number 1 under Kähler deformation". Inventiones Mathematicae. 160 (3). Springer Science and Business Media LLC: 591–645. Bibcode:2005InMat.160..591H. doi:10.1007/s00222-004-0417-9. hdl:10722/48613. ISSN 0020-9910. S2CID 52237844.
- Hwang, Jun-Muk (12 August 2008). "Base manifolds for fibrations of projective irreducible symplectic manifolds". Inventiones Mathematicae. 174 (3). Springer Science and Business Media LLC: 625–644. arXiv:0711.3224. Bibcode:2008InMat.174..625H. doi:10.1007/s00222-008-0143-9. ISSN 0020-9910. S2CID 17694524.
- Fu, Baohua; Hwang, Jun-Muk (8 December 2011). "Classification of non-degenerate projective varieties with non-zero prolongation and application to target rigidity". Inventiones Mathematicae. 189 (2). Springer Science and Business Media LLC: 457–513. arXiv:1011.4751. doi:10.1007/s00222-011-0369-9. ISSN 0020-9910. S2CID 253736967.
- Hwang, Jun-Muk; Weiss, Richard M. (30 May 2012). "Webs of Lagrangian tori in projective symplectic manifolds". Inventiones Mathematicae. 192 (1). Springer Science and Business Media LLC: 83–109. arXiv:1201.2369. doi:10.1007/s00222-012-0407-2. ISSN 0020-9910. S2CID 253745697.
