= National Academy of Sciences Award =

Academic award of South Korea

- Country: South Korea
- First award: 1955
- Website: National Academy of Sciences of the Republic of Korea

- National Academy of Sciences Award
- Hangul: 대한민국학술원상
- Hanja: 大韓民國學術院賞
- RR: Daehanminguk haksurwonsang
- MR: Taehanmin'guk haksurwŏnsang

The National Academy of Sciences Award (Korean: 대한민국학술원상) is an award presented to South Korean nationals who have made significant contributions to academic development through intensive research on a specific topic. Prize money of KRW 100 million is given in addition to the award. The award is given by the National Academy of Sciences of the Republic of Korea in accordance with Article 14 of the National Academy of Sciences of the Republic of Korea Act and Article 4 of the Academic Academy Prize Award Regulations. The first awards were given in 1955.

== Recipients ==
=== 1955–1985 ===
Year	Special achievement	Scholar	Humanities
1955	Choe Hyeon-bae (최현배); Yun Il-seon (윤일선)	–	Jeong Mungi (정문기)
1956	Lee Byeongdo (이병도); Yang Judong (양주동)	Jeong Taehyeon (정태현)	–
1957	Lee Huiseung (이희승)	–	–
1958	–	–	–
1959	Hyeon Singyu (현신규); Bak Donggil (박동길); Yu Jino (유진오); Jeong Inseung (정인승)	–	–
1960	Lee Jongryun (이종륜); Lee Taegyu (이태규); Lee Byeonggi (이병기)	Jo Bokseong (조복성); Bak Jonghong (박종홍)	–
1961	Jo Baekhyeon (조백현); Kim Myeongseon (김명선); Kim Gyesuk (김계숙)	Kim Sungyeong (김순경)	–
1962	Choe Hojin (최호진); Kim Sanggi (김상기); Kim Yungyeong (김윤경)	Jin Byeongho (진병호); Kim Cheolsu (김철수)	–
1963	Kim Hosik (김호식); Shin Seokho (신석호); Jo Yunje (조윤제)	Lee Gwangsu (이광수); Kang Yeongseon (강영선)	–
1964	Bak Seungman (박승만); Yun Iljung (윤일중); Kim Duheon (김두헌); Jo Uiseol (조의설)	Kim Cheol (김철); Lee Sungnyeong (이숭녕)	–
1965	Lee Jegu (이제구); Lee Minjae (이민재); Kim Jaewon (김재원)	Jo Suntak (조순탁)	–
1966	Yu Hongyeol (유홍렬); Jeong Gwanghyeon (정광현)	Kim Dujong (김두종)	–
1967	Son Chimu (손치무); Bak Cheoljae (박철재); Lee Sangeun (이상은)	–	–
1968	Ki Yongsuk (기용숙); Shin Giseok (신기석)	–	–
1969	Lee Huijun (이희준); Chae Yeseok (채예석); Ahn Donghyeok (안동혁); Bak Wonseon (박원선)	Ko Seungje (고승제)	–
1970	Kim Dongil (김동일)	–	–
1971	–	Han Gudong (한구동); Jo Gijun (조기준); Ko Hyeonggon (고형곤)	–
1972	Han Simseok (한심석); Kim Hyorok (김효록); Kim Donghwa (김동화)	Kim Okjun (김옥준)	–
1973	Jeon Pungjin (전풍진); Choe Jaehui (최재희-)	Lee Chunnyeong (이춘녕); U Ingeun (우인근); Shim Jaewan (심재완)	–
1974	–	Ko Byeongik (고병익); Kim Hyeonggyu (김형규)	–
1975	Bak Jeonggi (박정기)	Lee Munho (이문호); Kim Junseop (김준섭)	–
1976	–	Kim Sujin (김수진); Cha Sangwon (차상원)	–
1977	Kim Jongsa (김종사)	Kim Changhwan (김창환); Choe Taeyeong (최태영)	–
1978	Na Sejin (나세진)	Kim Jaegeun (김재근); Jeong Changhui (정창희); Kim Junbo (김준보)	–
1979	Choe Hyeongseop (최형섭); Kim Samsun (김삼순); Han Ugeun (한우근); Son Useong (손우성)	Seo Byeongseol (서병설)	–
1980	Jeon Haejong (전해종)	–	–
1981	Kim Wonyong (김원용)	Kim Junmin (김준민); Kim Bunggu (김붕구)	–
1982	Shim Jongseop (심종섭); Lee Sanggu (이상구); Oh Cheonseok (오천석)	Kwon Ihyeok (권이혁); Bak Bongyeol (박봉열); Lee Gibaek (이기백)	–
1983	Bak Hauk (박하욱); Nam Heungu (남흥우)	Baek Unha (백운하); Lee Uju (이우주); Kim Cheoljun (김철준); Kim Byeongcheol (김병철)	–
1984	Lee Huibong (이희봉); Kwon Nyeongdae (권녕대)	Yun Dongseok (윤동석); Lee Gwangin (이광인); Cha Juhwan (차주환); Lee Sangseop (이상섭)	–
1985	Lee Gyunsang (이균상)	Lee Duhyeon (이두현); Ju Jinsun (주진순)	–

=== 1986–1998 ===
Year	Applied natural science	Cultural science	Basic natural science	Social science	Natural science
1986	–	Cha Hasun (차하순)	–	Lee Mangap (이만갑)	–
1987	Im Hanjong (임한종); Yun Jangseop (윤장섭)	Kim Yongsuk (김용숙); Kim Taegil (김태길)	Choe Gyuwon (최규원)	–	–
1988	Kim Jinsu (김진수)	Min Dugi (민두기); Kim Gyuyeong (김규영)	Kim Hunsu (김훈수)	Kim Okgeun (김옥근)	–
1989	Mun Gukjin (문국진)	Im Seokjae (임석재)	Kim Bonggyun (김봉균)	Bak Chunho (박춘호)	–
1990	Lee Manyeong (이만영); Shim Bongseop (심봉섭)	–	Lee Taenyeong (이태녕)	Min Seonggi (민성기)	–
1991	Oh Bongguk (오봉국)	Kim Jongcheol (김종철)	Lee Sangman (이상만)	Min Seonggi (민성기)	–
1992	Ji Jegeun (지제근)	–	Ju Chungno (주충노); Shim Jeongseop (심정섭)	–	–
1993	Kim Sangju (김상주); Yun Takgu (윤탁구)	Lee Gimun (이기문)	Yun Neungmin (윤능민)	–	–
1994	–	Jeong Gyubok (정규복)	Bak Sehui (박세희)	Im Wontaek (임원택)	–
1995	Bak Yonghwi (박용휘)	Seo Jeongsu (서정수)	Choe Samgwon (최삼권)	–	–
1996	Kang Ilgu (강일구)	Jin Hongseop (진홍섭); Nam Gwangu (남광우)	So Chilseop (소칠섭)	–	–
1997	Kwon Ukhyeon (권욱현); Jo Janghui (조장희)	Lee Donhui (이돈희)	Yang Seonggil (양성길)	–	–
1998	–	Han Jeonsuk (한전숙)	–	Shin Yongha (신용하)	Kim Jinbok (김진복); Bak Sangdae (박상대); Lee Hyeongu (이현구)

=== 1999–2007 ===
Year	Natural science	Humanities/Social science
1999	Shim Sangcheol (심상철); Noh Mangyu (노만규)	Lee Seongmu (이성무); Jo Geungho (조긍호)
2000	Kim Sinhong (김신홍); Kang Hyeonsam (강현삼); Kang Seokho (강석호); Jo Uihwan (조의환)	Jo Dongil (조동일)
2001	Bak Seonghoe (박성회); Lee Byeonggi (이병기)	Bak Eunjeong (박은정)
2002	Noh Seungtak (노승탁); Noh Hyeonmo (노현모); Lee Yonghui (이용희)	lee Giyong (이기용); So Gwanghui (소광희)
2003	Han Mingu (한민구); Choe Hyeongin (최형인)	Lee Gyeongsik (이경식)
2004	Jo Seongho (조성호); Lee Hucheol (이후철); Kuk Young (국양)	–
2005	Lee Jangmu (이장무)	Kwon Byeongtak (권병탁); Lee Namin (이남인)
2006	Oh Utaek (오우택); Bak Yongan (박용안); Kim Seongcheol (김성철); Je Wonho (제원호)	lee Seongjin (이성진); Im Hongbin (임홍빈)
2007	Choe Yangdo (최양도); Jeong Jinha (정진하); Hwang Seongeun (황선근)	–

=== 2008–Current ===
Year	Applied natural science	Basic natural science	Humanities	Social science	Cultural science	Humanities/Social science
2008	Kim Donggyu (김동규)	Yun Gyeongbyeong (윤경병)	Oh Geumseong (오금성); Kang Sinhang (강신항)	–	–	–
2009	Jo Jongsu (조종수)	Nam Hong Gil; Shin Seongcheol (신성철)	Lee Hangu (이한구)	–	–	–
2010	Lee Daegil (이대길); Hong Sunhyeong (홍순형)	Kim Gyeongjin (김경진); Nam Chang-hee(남창희)	–	–	–	–
2011	Song Jinwon (송진원); Lee Gilseong (이길성)	Seo Sewon (서세원)	Oh Saenggeun (오생근)	–	–	–
2012	Kim Seonghun (김성훈); Yu Jeongyeol (유정열)	Choe Junho (최준호); Jo Minhaeng (조민행)	–	–	–	Heo Suyeol (허수열)
2013	Han Jaeyong (한재용); Choe Jeongyeon (최정연)	Lee Yongil (이용일); Choe Sangdon (최상돈)	–	–	Kim Jonggeon (김종건)	–
2014	Lee Sindu (이신두)	Bak Byeonguk (박병욱); Kang Byeongnam (강병남)	Lee Gyeongsik (이경식); Jo Namhyeon (조남현)	Bak Chungseok (박충석)	–	–
2015	Shin Changsu (신창수); Kim Segwon (김세권)	Lee Yungnam (이융남)	Ahn Hwijun (안휘준)	lee Geun (이근); Im Hyeokbaek (임혁백)	–	–
2016	Lee Yonghwan (이용환); Lee Jongmu (이종무)	Kaang Bong-Kiun (강봉균); Ahn Sunil (안순일)	Bak Samok (박삼옥); Choe Byeonghyeon (최병현)	–	–	–
2017	Kang Changyul (강창율); Lee Gwangbok (이광복)	U Gyeongsik (우경식); Lee Hyeonu (이현우)	Bak Seongjong (박성종)	Kim Seongguk (김성국)	–	–
2018	Choe Doil (최도일); Ahn Jonghyeon (안종현)	Lee Sangyeol (이상열); Geum Jonghae (금종해)	Lee Minhaeng (이민행)	Kim Byeongyeon (김병연)	–	–
2019	Yun Gyeonggu (윤경구)	Kim Jihyeon (김지현); Lee Pilho (이필호)	–	Lee Jongeun (이종은); Kim Yeonghwan (김영환)	–	–
2020	Chae Jongil (채종일); Kwon Dongil (권동일)	Lee Yeongjo (이영조); Baek Seonghui (백성희)	–	Kim Munjo (김문조); Kim Gwangsu (김광수)	Do Suhui (도수희); Noh Myeongho (노명호)	–
2021	Oh Seokbae (오석배); Lee Geonu (이건우)	Hwang Jun-Muk (황준묵); Ahn Gyeongwon (안경원)	–	Lee Yujae (이유재)	Bak Hanje (박한제)	–
2022	Lee Sang-yeop (이상엽); Lee Seokha (이석하)	Nam Wonwoo (남원우); Lee Seonggeun (이성근)	–	Kim Taekmin (김택민); Nam Pung-hyeon (남풍현)	Lee Jonghwa (이종화); Choi Seon-woong (최선웅)	–
2023	Choe Byeongin (최병인); Baek Jongbeom (백종범)	Hwang Ildu (황일두); Kim Dongho (김동호)	–	Yang Jaejin (양재진)	Oh Yangho (오양호)	–
2024	Kim Yun-young (김윤영); Seong Je-kyung (성제경)	Chae Dong-ho (채동호); Kim Jae-beom (김재범)	Nam Moon-hyun (남문현)	Choi Byeong-seon (최병선)	–	–

== See also ==
- Korea Engineering Award
- NAEK Award
