= Noh Do Young =

South Korean physicist (born 1963)

- 노도영
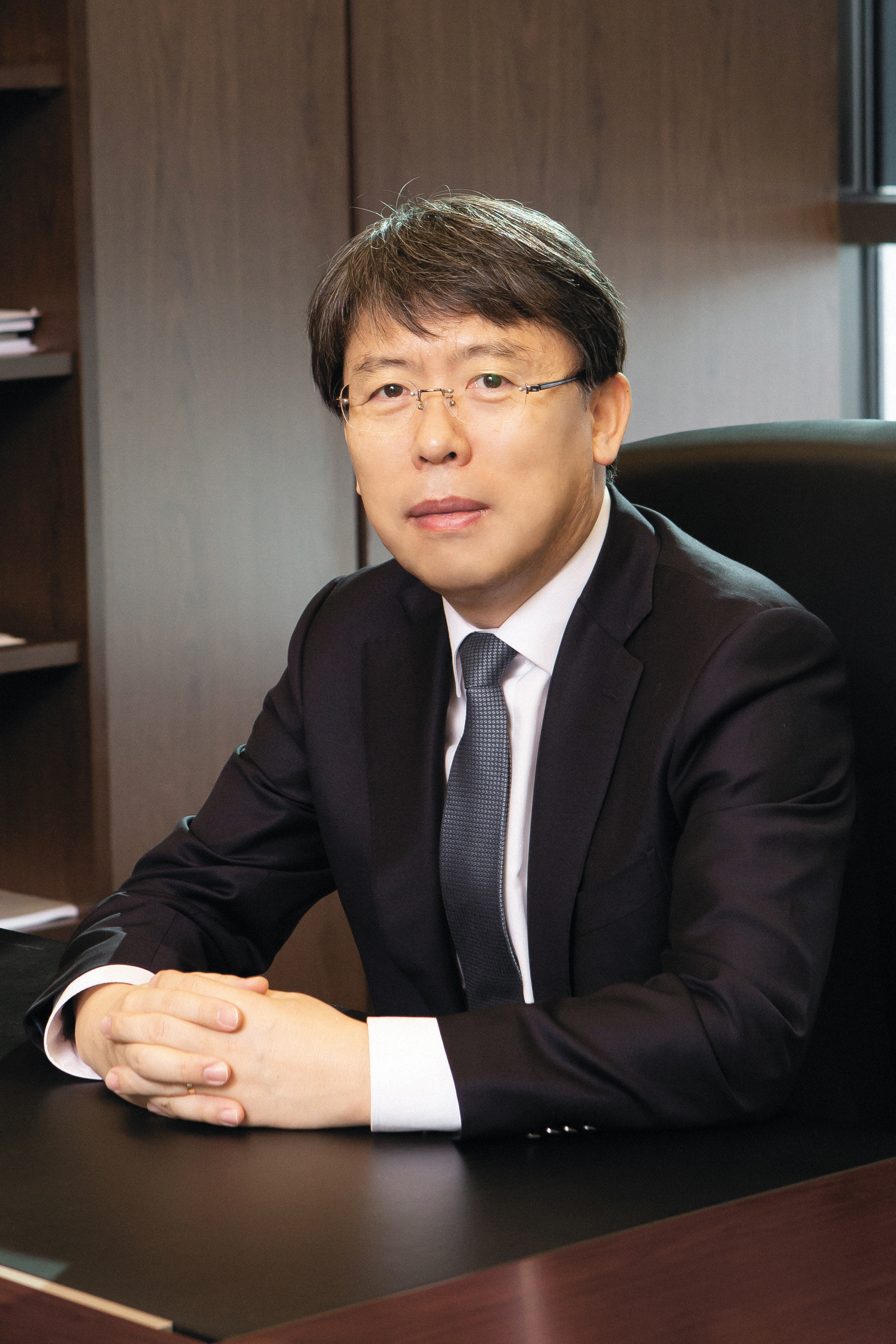
- Born: January 13, 1963; Gwangju, South Korea
- Citizenship: Korean
- Education: Massachusetts Institute of Technology, Seoul National University
- Scientific career
- Fields: Condensed matter physics, materials physics, X-ray science, ultrafast phenomena
- Workplaces: Institute for Basic Science, Gwangju Institute of Science and Technology
- Thesis: X-Ray Scattering Study of Orientational and Positional Order in Liquid Crystal Films (1991)
- Doctoral advisor: Robert J. Birgeneau

Korean name
- Hangul: 노도영
- Hanja: 魯都永
- RR: No Doyeong
- MR: No Toyŏng
- Website: X-ray Laboratory for Nanoscale Phenomena

Noh Do Young (Korean: 노도영; born January 13, 1963) is a South Korean physicist specializing in condensed matter physics and materials science using synchrotrons and XFELs. He has developed and applied various frontier X-ray diffraction methods to study condensed matter systems, including recent coherent X-ray diffraction imaging technique. His research has utilized a number of synchrotron radiation facilities, such as Advanced Photon Source, SPring-8, National Synchrotron Light Source, PLS, and X-ray free electron lasers, including SCALA and PAL-XFEL.

Most of his career has been at the Gwangju Institute of Science and Technology (GIST) where he was a physics professor, dean of GIST College, and director of the Center for Advanced X-ray Science and the GIST National Core Research Center. He has also served as member of the Korea Research Council of Fundamental Science Technology before becoming the president of the Korea Synchrotron Radiation User's Association. He is a council member of the Presidential Advisory Council for Science and Technology, and the third president of the Institute for Basic Science.

== Education ==
Noh received a B.S. in Physics from Seoul National University in 1985. He then went to the Massachusetts Institute of Technology for his Ph.D. which was completed in 1991 under doctoral adviser Professor Robert J. Birgeneau. His thesis was a series of X-ray scattering studies concerning the positional and orientational order in two and three dimensional liquid crystal systems.

== Career ==
After graduating, he stayed at the Massachusetts Institute of Technology as a post-doctoral associate through 1992. His next position was as a senior physicist at the Exxon Research and Engineering Company in 1993. Two years later, he returned to his home country and started working at the Gwangju Institute of Science and Technology as an assistant professor in the Department of Physics and Photon Science & School of Materials Science and Engineering. Over the years, he became a full professor, dean of GIST College, and director of the Graduate Program of Photonic Science & Technology and the Center for Advanced X-ray Science. He was also the director of the GIST National Core Research Center (NCRC) from 2008 to 2015.

He has served as a member of the Korea Research Council of Fundamental Science Technology. Other positions include serving as the chairman of the Foundation Expert Committee, National Science & Technology Council, president of the Korea Synchrotron Radiation User's Association, and council member on the Presidential Advisory Council for Science and Technology. In November 2019, he became the third president of the Institute for Basic Science (IBS). His inauguration ceremony was also the farewell ceremony for Kim Doochul, the second IBS president.

== Honors and awards ==
- 2025: Science and Technology Innovation Award
- 2012: Order of Science and Technology Merit, Korea
- 2010: Honorary doctorate degree, Nara Institute of Science and Technology
- 2007: Commendation, President of the Republic of Korea
- 2002: Commendation, Ministry of Science and Technology, Korea

== See also ==
- Oh Se-jung
- Kim Doochul
- Kuk Young
