= Robert J. Birgeneau =

Canadian physicist (born 1942)

Robert J. Birgeneau FRS
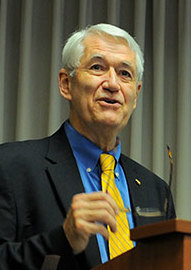
- Birgeneau in May 2016

9th Chancellor of the University of California, Berkeley
- In office 2004–2013
- Preceded by: Robert Berdahl
- Succeeded by: Nicholas Dirks

14th President of the University of Toronto
- In office 2000–2004
- Chancellor: Hal Jackman; Vivienne Poy
- Preceded by: Robert Prichard
- Succeeded by: Frank Iacobucci (interim)

Personal details
- Born: Robert Joseph Birgeneau; March 25, 1942 (age 84) Toronto, Ontario, Canada
- Spouse: Mary Catherine Birgeneau
- Education: University of Toronto (BSc); Yale University (PhD)
- Scientific career
- Awards: Founders Award, American Academy of Arts & Sciences
- Fields: Physics
- Workplaces: Bell Laboratories; Massachusetts Institute of Technology
- Thesis: Magnetic interactions in rare earth insulators (1967)
- Doctoral advisor: Werner P. Wolf
- Doctoral students: Gabriel Aeppli; Martin Greven; Bernhard Keimer; Noh Do Young; Luz Martinez-Miranda

Robert Joseph Birgeneau (born March 25, 1942) is a Canadian-American physicist and university administrator. He was the fourteenth president of the University of Toronto from 2000 to 2004, and the ninth chancellor of the University of California, Berkeley from 2004 to 2013.

== Biography ==
The first from his family to finish high school, Birgeneau graduated from St. Michael's College School in Toronto. He received a B.Sc in mathematics in 1963 from St. Michael's College in the University of Toronto, where he also met his wife Mary Catherine; they have four children. Birgeneau received his Ph.D in physics from Yale University in 1966 for thesis titled Magnetic Interactions in Rare-Earth Insulators under the supervision of Werner P. Wolf.

He spent a year each on the faculties of Yale and the University of Oxford. From 1968 to 1975, he worked at AT&T Bell Laboratories.

=== MIT ===
He then joined the Massachusetts Institute of Technology as a professor of physics. During his 25 years at MIT, he served as Chair of the Physics Department and ultimately as Dean of Science.

=== University of Toronto ===
He was then appointed to serve as the President of the University of Toronto, a role he held from 2000 to 2004. Birgeneau appointed Shirley Neuman as Vice President and Provost (chief academic officer) in July 2002, but she resigned on February 2, 2004, after just 19 months on the post. It was reported that Neuman’s head-strong approach alienated her from colleagues and students, and there were also tensions between Birgeneau and herself.

He left the University of Toronto after only four years of his term (despite the fact that his five-year term had been extended to seven years on his own request), causing a flurry of controversy with his abrupt departure.

=== UC Berkeley ===
He was recommended to the UC Board of Regents by Robert Dynes, then President of the UC system and a former colleague of Birgeneau when both worked at AT&T Bell Laboratories.

Birgeneau has used his platform as Chancellor to make contributions to several political debates. On June 14, 2007, Birgeneau joined the President of Columbia University in condemning Britain's University and College Union for boycotting Israeli academics and academic institutions and insisting that any boycott include their universities. Citing the "likely" threat to California's academic competitiveness if Proposition 8 were passed, Birgeneau urged the UC Berkeley community to vote against a 2008 state ballot measure which would eliminate the right of gays and lesbians to marry. During the 2011-2012 academic year, he sent campus wide messages in support of the California Dream Act, which allows undocumented students to qualify for financial aid, the reform of Proposition 13, which would close corporate property tax loopholes passed by voters in the late 1970s and reallocate that funding to social services, including higher education, and the repeal of Proposition 209, which would reenact affirmative action and significantly increase diversity in the nation's public higher education institutions.

Also during the 2011–2012 academic year, Birgeneau unveiled Berkeley MCAP, the Middle Class Access Plan, a new financial aid model that caps the total annual cost of an eligible students' education – from tuition and fees to expenses including room, board and books – at 15 percent of the family's total income. Families with incomes from $80,000 to $140,000 and assets typical of that range are eligible for the program, which will provide grants beginning with the fall 2012 semester. While the UC-wide Blue and Gold program aids lower-income families, this is the first program of its kind in the system to benefit the middle class. It also served as impetus for the statewide Middle Class Scholarship program, announced by California Assembly Speaker John Perez.

Birgeneau was succeeded by Nicholas Dirks as chancellor of UC Berkeley on June 1, 2013.

Academic offices
Preceded by Robert Prichard	President of the University of Toronto; 2000–2004	Succeeded by David Naylor
Preceded by Robert Berdahl	Chancellor of the University of California, Berkeley; 2004–2013	Succeeded by Nicholas Dirks
