= Hwang Byungki =

South Korean musician (1937–2018)

- Hwang in 1976

Korean name
- Hangul: 황병기
- Hanja: 黃秉冀
- RR: Hwang Byeonggi
- MR: Hwang Pyŏnggi

Hwang Byungki (31 May 1936, in Seoul – 31 January 2018) was the foremost South Korean player of the gayageum, a 12-string zither with silk strings. He was also a composer and an authority on sanjo, a form of traditional Korean instrumental music.

In 1951, he began playing the gayageum at The National Center for Korean Traditional Performing Arts in Seoul, where he studied under the renowned gayageum masters Kim Yeong-yun (김영윤), Kim Yun-deok (김윤덕), and Shim Sang-geon (심상건). In 1959 he graduated from Seoul National University School of Law.

In 1962, he began composing concert and film music using traditional Korean instruments. He presented the premiere performance of Alan Hovhaness's Symphony no. 16 in South Korea in 1963. In 1964 he traveled around the world to Europe, the United States, Japan, and Southeast Asian countries, giving gayageum performances in each place.

In 1985, he served as visiting professor of Korean Music at Harvard University.

In 1990, he led a group of musicians from the South Korea at the Pan-Korean Unification Concert in Pyongyang, North Korea.

After producing his fifth gayageum album in 2007, Hwang continued to compose innovative Korean music. Ranging in style from the evocation of traditional genres to avant-garde experimentation, a selection of these pieces is available on a series of five albums. He was an emeritus professor of Korean music at Ewha Womans University. Hwang also taught a course entitled ″Introduction to Korean Traditional Music″ at Yonsei University in Seoul.

Hwang served on the government's Cultural Properties Preservation Committee, and in 2000 was appointed to the National Academy of Arts.

He was married to writer Han Malsook and their eldest son is mathematician Jun-Muk Hwang.

== Discography ==
Hwang has published a number of albums, among which is a set of five volume albums that are representative of his work:

- Vol. 1: Chimhyang-moo (침향무; 沈香舞), literally "Dancing Among Agarwood Incense"
- Vol. 2: The Silk Road (비단길; 絲綢之路)
- Vol. 3: The Labyrinth (미궁; 迷宮)
- Vol. 4: Spring Snow (춘설; 春雪)
- Vol. 5: Darha Nopigom (달하 노피곰), based on the Baekje gayo (a type of Korean poetry) named Jeongeupsa (정읍사 井邑詞)

== Awards ==
- 2004: Ho-Am Prize in the Arts
