= Ngaiming Mok =

- Born: 1956 (age 69–70); Hong Kong
- Scientific career
- Doctoral advisor: Yum-Tong Siu

Chinese name
- Chinese: 莫毅明
Transcriptions
Standard Mandarin
- Hanyu Pinyin: Mò Yìmíng
Yue: Cantonese
- Yale Romanization: Mohk Ngaih-mìhng
- Jyutping: Mok6 Ngai6ming4

Ngaiming Mok (Chinese: 莫毅明; pinyin: Mò Yìmíng; born 1956) is a Hong Kong mathematician specializing in complex differential geometry and algebraic geometry. He is currently a professor at the University of Hong Kong.

After graduating from St. Paul's Co-educational College in Hong Kong in 1975, Mok studied at the University of Chicago and Yale University, obtaining his M.A. in Mathematics from Yale in 1978. He obtained his Ph.D. from Stanford University under the guidance of Yum-Tong Siu. He taught at Princeton University, Columbia University and the University of Paris-Saclay before joining the faculty of the University of Hong Kong in 1994. He has been the director of the University of Hong Kong's Institute of Mathematical Research since 1999.

The awards Mok has received include a Sloan Fellowship in 1984, the Presidential Young Investigator Award in Mathematics in 1985, and the Stefan Bergman Prize in 2009. Mok was an invited speaker at the 1994 International Congress of Mathematicians in Zurich and served on the Fields Medal committee at the 2010 ICM in Hyderabad. He was on the editorial board of Inventiones Mathematicae from 2002 to 2014, and he is currently an editor of Mathematische Annalen. He was elected as Member of the Chinese Academy of Sciences (Division of Mathematics and Physics) in 2015, and a fellow of the American Mathematical Society in 2019. In 2023, Mok became a laureate of the Asian Scientist 100 by the Asian Scientist.

Mok is a polyglot, being able to speak Chinese (including Mandarin and Cantonese), English, French, German, Italian, Russian, Japanese and more.

== Notable publications ==
- Ngaiming Mok. The uniformization theorem for compact Kähler manifolds of nonnegative holomorphic bisectional curvature. J. Differential Geom. 27 (1988), no. 2, 179–214. doi:10.4310/jdg/1214441778
- Ngaiming Mok. Metric rigidity theorems on Hermitian locally symmetric manifolds. Series in Pure Mathematics, 6. World Scientific Publishing Co., Inc., Teaneck, NJ, 1989. xiv+278 pp. ISBN 9971-50-800-1, 9971-50-802-8. doi:10.1142/0773

== See also ==
- Jun-Muk Hwang
