= Han Malsook =

South Korean writer (born 1931)

- Born: December 27, 1931 (age 94); Keijō, Korea, Empire of Japan
- Education: Seoul National University
- Writing career
- Language: Korean

- Han Malsook
- Hangul: 한말숙
- Hanja: 韓末淑
- RR: Han Malsuk
- MR: Han Malsuk

Han Malsook (Korean: 한말숙; born December 27, 1931) is a South Korean writer.

== Life ==
Han Malsook was born on December 27, 1931, in Keijō (Seoul), Korea, Empire of Japan. Han graduated from Seoul National University with a Linguistics degree and worked in an advisory capacity in the Department of Public Reports. She was also a lecturer at Seoul National University's Music School. Her literary debut was in 1956 with two of her short stories ("The Season in Starlight" and "Precipice of a Myth") that were published in the Contemporary Literature Journal at the suggestion of Kim Dong-ni. Han was also a member of the UNESCO Korean Committee.

Malsook was married to gayageum musician Hwang Byungki. Their eldest son is mathematician Jun-Muk Hwang.

== Work ==
With vivid imagery, inventive writing style and keen perception, Han Malsook captures the multifaceted interiority of alienated human beings, in particular, the psychology of contemporary women in the postwar setting. Her major work, “A Precipice of Myth” (Sinhwaui danae, 1960), utilizes existentialist perspective to probe the damaged psychology of a woman whose denial of conventional ethics and the very idea of future allows her to lead a temporal existence defined solely by pursuit of pleasure and comfort. A story that embodies the postwar atmosphere of self-abandonment and nihilistic approach to life, it won the author instant recognition and became the main subject of existentialist discussion in the latter half of 1950's. Han explored these views further in “A Promise with God” (Singwaui yaksok, 1968). The story features a woman who bargains with God for her daughter's life, but realizes after her daughter's recovery that she cannot embrace faith in God as she had promised. For the protagonist, the object of her dedication remains her daughter, not God. Han has also focused her literary attention on a wide range of different subjects. “An Old Woman and A Cat” (Nopawa goyangi) investigates the nature of alienation through the perspective of an old woman abandoned by her family. "A White Path" (Hayan dojeong, 1963) describes a younger generation's struggle against the hypocrisy and corruption of their parents. “The Rainy Season’ (Jangma) sexualizes man's defiance against nature.

Han is known for works including Certain Death (Eotteon jugeum), An Old Woman and a Cat, The Rainy Season, Black Rose (Geomeun jangmi) and “A White Distance". "Traces" (Heunjeok), which depicts the triumph of sympathy and trust over mammonism, was awarded the 1963 Contemporary Literature Prize, and “A Promise with God” won the 1968 Literary Composition Prize. Her novels include The Age of Exploration (Mosaek sidae, 1980) and A Beautiful Hymn of the Spirit (Areumdaun yeongga, 1981).

== Works in translation ==
- Hymn of the Spirit (translated by Suzanne Crowder Han)

== Selected works in Korean ==
Novels

- The Age of Exploration (Mosaek sidae, 1980)
- A Beautiful Hymn of the Spirit (Areumdaun yeongga, 1981)

Notable works

- Certain Death (Eotteon jugeum)
- An Old Woman and a Cat
- The Rainy Season
- Black Rose (Geomeun jangmi)
- A White Distance
- Traces (Heunjeok)

== Awards ==
- Contemporary Literature Prize (1963)
- Literary Composition Prize (1968)
