= Kim Doochul =

South Korean theoretical physicist (born 1948)

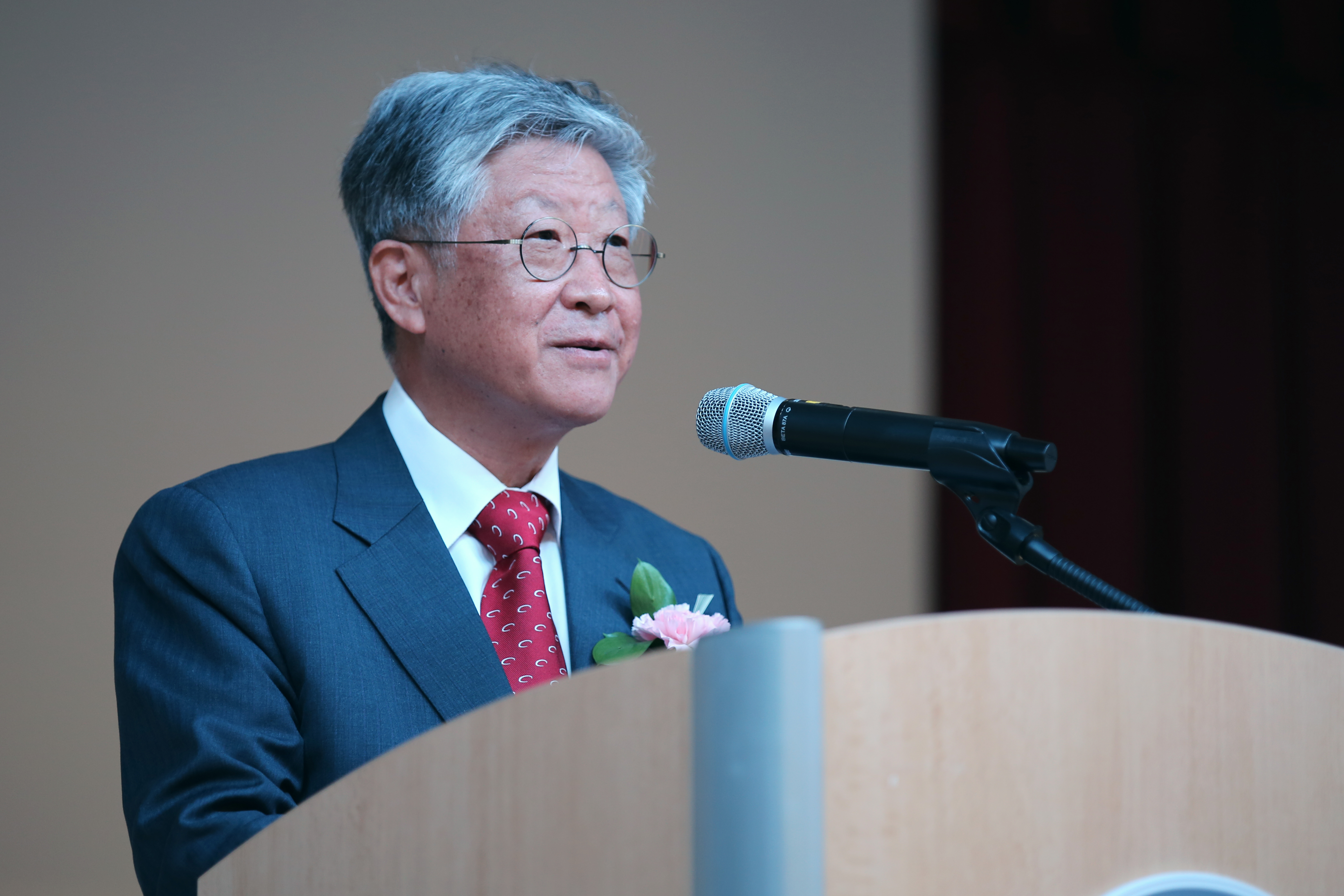
- Born: August 8, 1948 (age 78); Seoul, southern Korea
- Education: Seoul National University, Johns Hopkins University
- Scientific career
- Fields: Statistical physics, phase transition, mathematical properties of integrable systems, traffic modeling
- Workplaces: New York University, University of Melbourne, Seoul National University, Korean Academy of Science and Technology, Korea Institute for Advanced Study, Asia Pacific Center for Theoretical Physics, Korean Physical Society, Institute for Basic Science

Korean name
- Hangul: 김두철
- Hanja: 金斗哲
- RR: Gim Ducheol
- MR: Kim Tuch'ŏl

Kim Doochul (Korean: 김두철; Hanja: 金斗哲; born August 8, 1948) is a South Korean theoretical physicist. He was head of the Department of Physics, director of the BK21 Physics Research Division, and professor emeritus at Seoul National University. He was also a fellow and chairperson in the Korean Academy of Science and Technology before becoming the fifth president of Korea Institute for Advanced Study and the second president of Institute for Basic Science. He was a standing trustee with the Asia Pacific Center for Theoretical Physics and a board of Trustee member of the Korean Physical Society.

== Education ==
Kim received his bachelor of science in electronic engineering from Seoul National University in 1970 and a Ph.D. in electrical engineering from Johns Hopkins University in 1974 with a focus in statistical physics.

== Career ==
From 1974 to 1977, he was a postdoctoral research fellow at New York University and the University of Melbourne. Next he became a professor in the Department of Physics and Astronomy of Seoul National University (SNU), a position he held through August 2010. While at SNU, he was also chairperson in the Department of Physics, director of the BK21 Physics Research Division, head of the Department of Physics, and professor emeritus. Within the Korean Academy of Science and Technology, he was a fellow and later chairperson of the Division of Natural Sciences.

From July 2010 to June 2013, he was the 5th president of the Korea Institute for Advanced Study. After winning the 20th Sudang Award in Basic Science in 2011, he became the Basic Science Committee Member for the Sudang Award from the 21st presentation to the 29th (2012-2019). His final position was as the second president of the Institute for Basic Science from September 2014 until September 2019. His November farewell ceremony was also the inauguration ceremony for incoming president Noh Do Young.

== Awards and honors ==
- 2011: Sudang Award in Basic Science, Sudang Foundation
- 2011: Samil Prize, Samil Foundation
- 2009: 58th Seoul Cultural Award in Natural Sciences
- 2008: Education Award, Seoul National University
- 1998: Academic Award for Outstanding Research, Korean Physical Society
- 1987: Best Paper Award, Korean Physical Society
