= Yoon Kyung-byung =

South Korean chemist (born 1956)

- Born: March 10, 1956 (age 70); Seoul, South Korea
- Education: Seoul National University
- Known for: Artificial Photosynthesis, Zeolite, Crystal Organization
- Awards: Taikyue Ree Academic Award, Korean Chemical Society (2007); Academic Award, National Academy of Science (2008); Korea Science Award (2009)
- Scientific career
- Fields: Artificial Photosynthesis, Zeolite, Crystal Organization
- Workplaces: Department of Chemistry, Sogang University, Seoul, South Korea Korea Center for Artificial Photosynthesis
- Doctoral advisor: Professor Jay K. Kochi

- Yoon Kyung-byung
- Hangul: 윤경병
- Hanja: 尹景炳
- RR: Yun Gyeongbyeong
- MR: Yun Kyŏngbyŏng

Yoon Kyung-byung (Korean: 윤경병; born March 10, 1956) is a South Korean chemist.

== Education ==
Yoon received his B.S. in chemistry from Seoul National University in 1979 and his M.S. in chemistry from the Korea Advanced Institute of Science and Technology (KAIST), Seoul in 1981. From 1981 to 1984 he was employed by Chon Engineering in Seoul. There he gained experience in catalyst design and the engineering of chemical process plants. In 1989, he earned his Ph.D. degree in inorganic chemistry from the University of Houston, Texas, where his research advisor was Professor Jay K. Kochi.

== Work ==
Yoon has been an assistant, associate (1993) and full professor (1998) at Sogang University in Seoul from 1989 to the present. He has been leading the Korea Center for Artificial Photosynthesis, Sogang University since 2009.

He is the chairman of Scientific Affairs of FACS and also serves as a councilor of the International Zeolite Association and the Asian-Oceanian Photochemistry Association.

Yoon also serves on editorial board for a number of journals including Reviews in Inorganic Chemistry, Advanced Porous Materials and Frontiers in Green and Environmental Chemistry.

== Awards ==
- 2007 Taikyue Ree Academic Award, Korean Chemical Society
- 2008 Academic Award, National Academy of Science
- 2009 Korea Science Award

== Technical reports and conference/event proceedings ==
In the early stage of his study, Yoon contributed to the field of charge transfer complexes formation and charge transfer phenomenon in the nanopores of zeolite. Since 2000, he has shown that a new functional material can be produced through 2D and 3D arrays of silica nanobeads and zeolite microcrystals by using them as nanometer and micrometer scale building blocks. This finding not only shows that nano- and micro-sized particles can be included as a new class of building blocks but also means that organization of zeolite microcrystals has been settled down as a field of study in the future of material chemistry(Acc. Chem. Res. 2007, 40, 29–40).

He also showed diversity in the field of organization of microparticles, indicating that in the case of microcrystals synthesis, they are synthesized and self-assembled, similar to the 2D and 3D aligned supercrystals made up of atoms and molecules. Furthermore, he raised awareness about the importance of organization of micro particles by showing that microcrystals can be synthesized and any axes of microcrystals can be oriented in a certain direction (Science, 2003, 301, 818–821).

Yoon developed an innovative method named "Forced Manual Assembly" which significantly contributed to a very simple, time saving, and highly precise organization of nano and microparticles into monolayers on flat substrates (Angew. Chem. Int. Ed. 2007, 46, 3087–3090. J. Am. Chem. Soc. 2009, 131, 14228–14230).

Besides, he developed a new method to prepare zeolite separation membrane which can perfectly separate para-xylenes with a purity of 99.99 percent or higher from a small molecule mixture of ortho- and para-xylenes (Science, 2011, 334, 1533–1538).

Since the opening of the Korea Center for Artificial Photosynthesis (KCAP) at Sogang University in 2009, he has been working to develop this field.
