= Ho Wang Lee =

South Korean virologist (1928–2022)

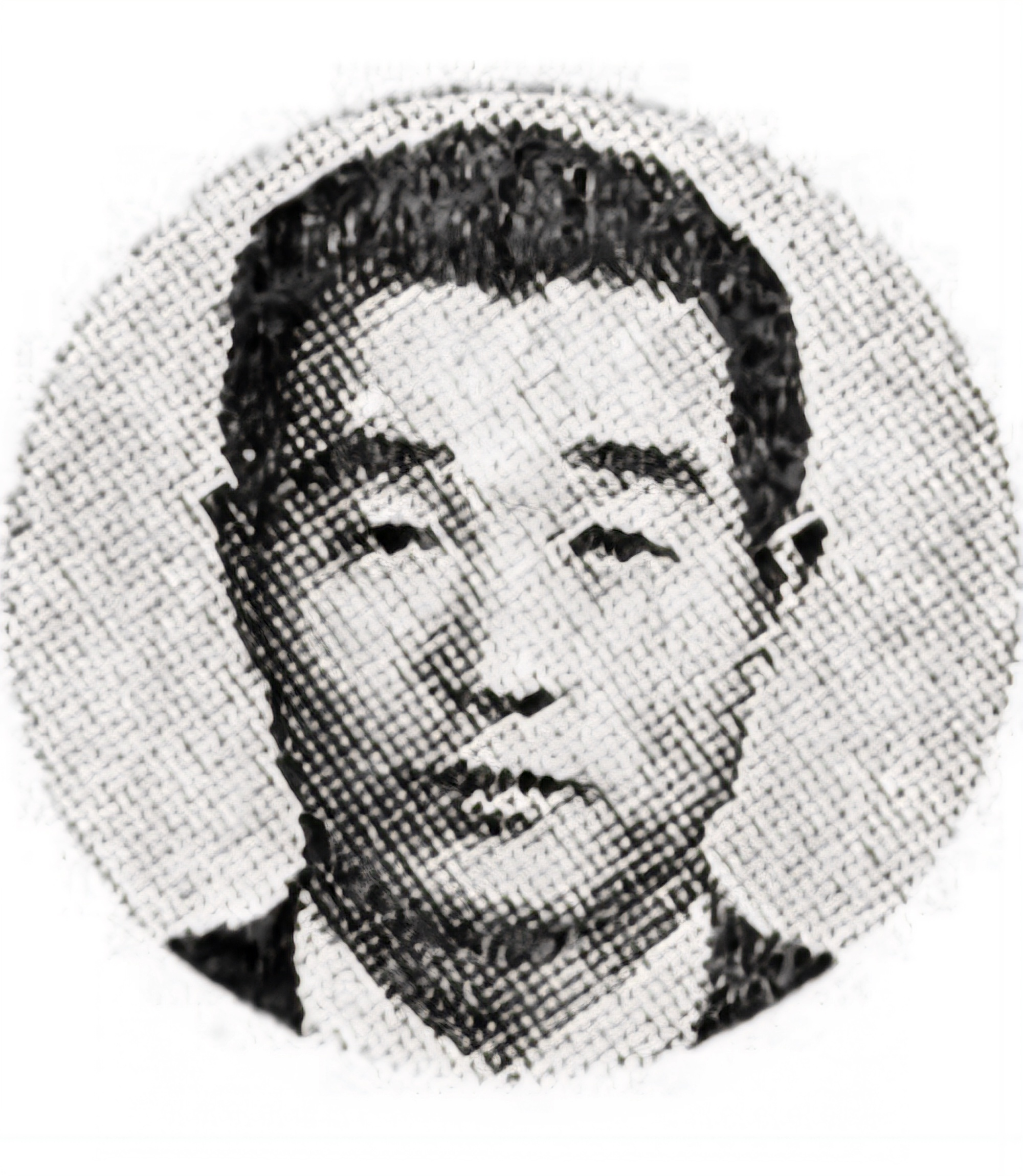
- Lee in 1972

Korean name
- Hangul: 이호왕
- Hanja: 李鎬汪
- RR: I Howang
- MR: I Howang

Ho Wang Lee (Korean: 이호왕; 26 October 1928 – 5 July 2022) was a South Korean physician, epidemiologist, and virologist. He was the first person in the history of medicine to be the one chiefly responsible for all three of the following steps: discovery of a virus causing a human disease, development of a method of diagnosis for the disease, and development of a vaccine against the disease.

== Biography ==
Lee was born in Sinhung, Kankyōnan Province (South Hamgyong Province), Korea, Empire of Japan on 26 October 1928. He studied medicine at Seoul National University with an M.D. degree in 1954 and was awarded a doctorate at the University of Minnesota in 1959. From 1954 to 1972 he was a professor of microbiology at the Medical College of Seoul National University, as well as dean of the Medical College. From 1972 to 1994 he was the director of the Department of Virology of Korea University. From 1994 to his death he was the director of the ASAN Institute for Life Sciences in South Korea.

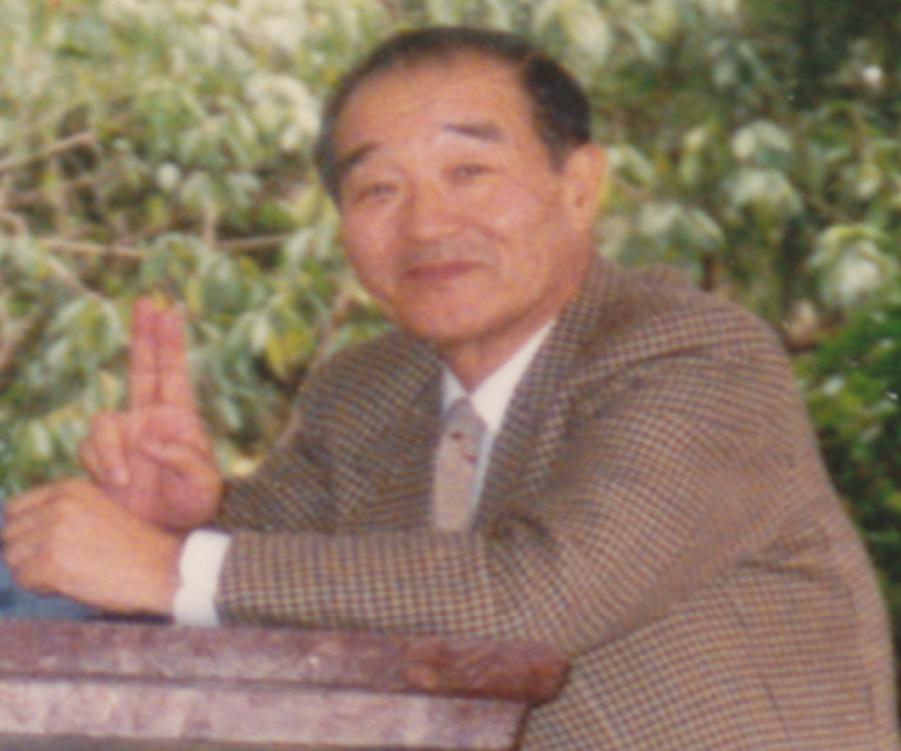
Lee in the 1980s

In 1976 Lee and his collaborators succeeded in isolating the virus causing Korean hemorrhagic fever; they gave it the name Hantaan virus. The discovery caused a sensation in the international community of medical researchers, because the quest for isolating the virus had been the subject of intense effort since the early 1950s. The research involved in isolating the virus was dangerous, and several of Lee's collaborators became ill due to aerosols produced by chronically infected rodents.

In 1989 Lee and collaborators developed a formalin-inactivated suckling mouse Hantaan virus vaccine, which under the name Hantavax™ has been approved for commercial use in South Korea since 1990. In 1990, Lee and Tetsuo Tomiyama, a professor of clinical pathology at Tokyo University Hospital, published their findings for their method of rapid serodiagnosis of hantavirus infections.

Ho Wang Lee became one of the first South Korean scientists to gain international fame while continuing to do research primarily in South Korea.

== Awards and honors ==
- 1981 — Member of the Korean National Academy of Sciences
- 1981 — Director of the WHO Collaborating Center for Virus Reference and Research
- 1987 — President of the International Conference on Hemorrhagic Fever with Renal Syndrome
- 1987 — Inchon Award
- 1989 — Korea Science Award
- 1992 — Ho-Am Prize
- 1994 — Prince Mahidol Award
- 1998 — International member of the American Philosophical Society
- 2001 — Nikkei Asia Prize for Science, Technology and Environment
- 2002 — Foreign member of the United States National Academy of Sciences
- 2004 — Foreign honorary member of the American Academy of Arts and Sciences
- 2021 — Clarivate Citation Laureates in Physiology or Medicine
