= Yum-Tong Siu =

Chinese mathematician (born 1943)

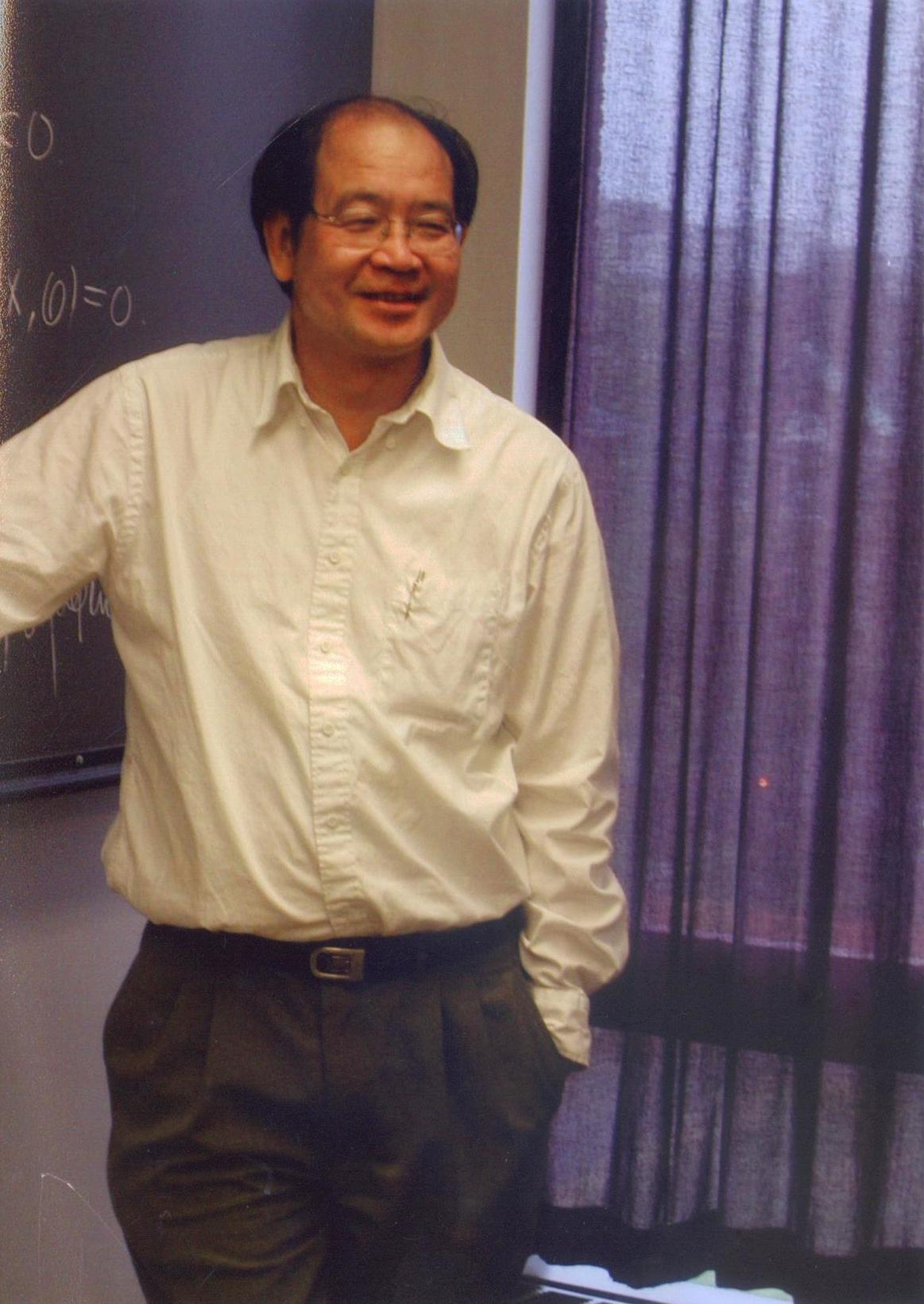
- Yum-Tong Siu in 2000
- Born: May 6, 1943 (age 83); Guangzhou, China
- Education: University of Hong Kong (BA); University of Minnesota (MA); Princeton University (PhD)
- Scientific career
- Fields: Complex analysis
- Workplaces: Harvard University
- Doctoral advisor: Robert C. Gunning
- Doctoral students: Jun-Muk Hwang, Ngaiming Mok

Chinese name
- Traditional Chinese: 蕭蔭堂
- Simplified Chinese: 萧荫堂
- Hanyu Pinyin: Xiāo Yìntáng
- Yale Romanization: Sīu Yamtòhng
- Jyutping: Siu1 Jam3-tong4

Yum-Tong Siu (Chinese: 蕭蔭堂; born May 6, 1943) is a Chinese mathematician. He is the William Elwood Byerly Professor of Mathematics at Harvard University.

Siu is a prominent figure in the study of functions of several complex variables. His research interests involve the intersection of complex variables, differential geometry, and algebraic geometry. He has resolved various conjectures by applying estimates of the complex Neumann problem and the theory of multiplier ideal sheaves to algebraic geometry.

== Education and career ==
Siu obtained his B.A. in mathematics from the University of Hong Kong in 1963, his M.A. from the University of Minnesota, and his Ph.D. from Princeton University in 1966. Siu completed his doctoral dissertation, titled "Coherent Noether-Lasker decomposition of subsheaves and sheaf cohomology", under the supervision of Robert C. Gunning. Before joining Harvard, he taught at Purdue University, the University of Notre Dame, Yale, and Stanford. In 1982 he joined Harvard as a professor, of Mathematics. He previously served as the Chairman of the Harvard Math Department.

In 2006, Siu published a proof of the finite generation of the pluricanonical ring.

== Awards, honors and professional memberships ==
In 1993, Siu received the Stefan Bergman Prize of the American Mathematical Society. He has holds honorary doctorates from the University of Hong Kong, University of Bochum, Germany, and University of Macau. He is a Corresponding Member of the Goettingen Academy of Sciences (elected 1993); a Foreign member of the Chinese Academy of Sciences (elected 2004); and a member of the American Academy of Arts & Sciences (elected 1998), the National Academy of Sciences (elected 2002), and Academia Sinica, Taiwan (elected 2004). He has been an invited speaker at the International Congress of Mathematicians in Helsinki (1978), Warsaw (1983) and Beijing (2002).

Currently, Siu is a member of the Scientific Advisory Board of the Clay Mathematics Institute (since 2003); the Advisory Committee for the Shaw Prize In Mathematical Sciences (since 2010); the Advisory Committee for the Millennium Prize Problems under the sponsorship of the Clay Mathematics Institute; the Scientific Advisory Board for the Institute for Mathematics Sciences, National University of Singapore (since 2009) and the Institute of Advanced Studies, Nanyang Technological University, Singapore (since 2006).

== See also ==
- Göttingen Academy of Sciences
- Siu's semicontinuity theorem
- List of graduates of University of Hong Kong
- Math 55
