= Oh Se-jung =

South Korean physicist (born 1954)

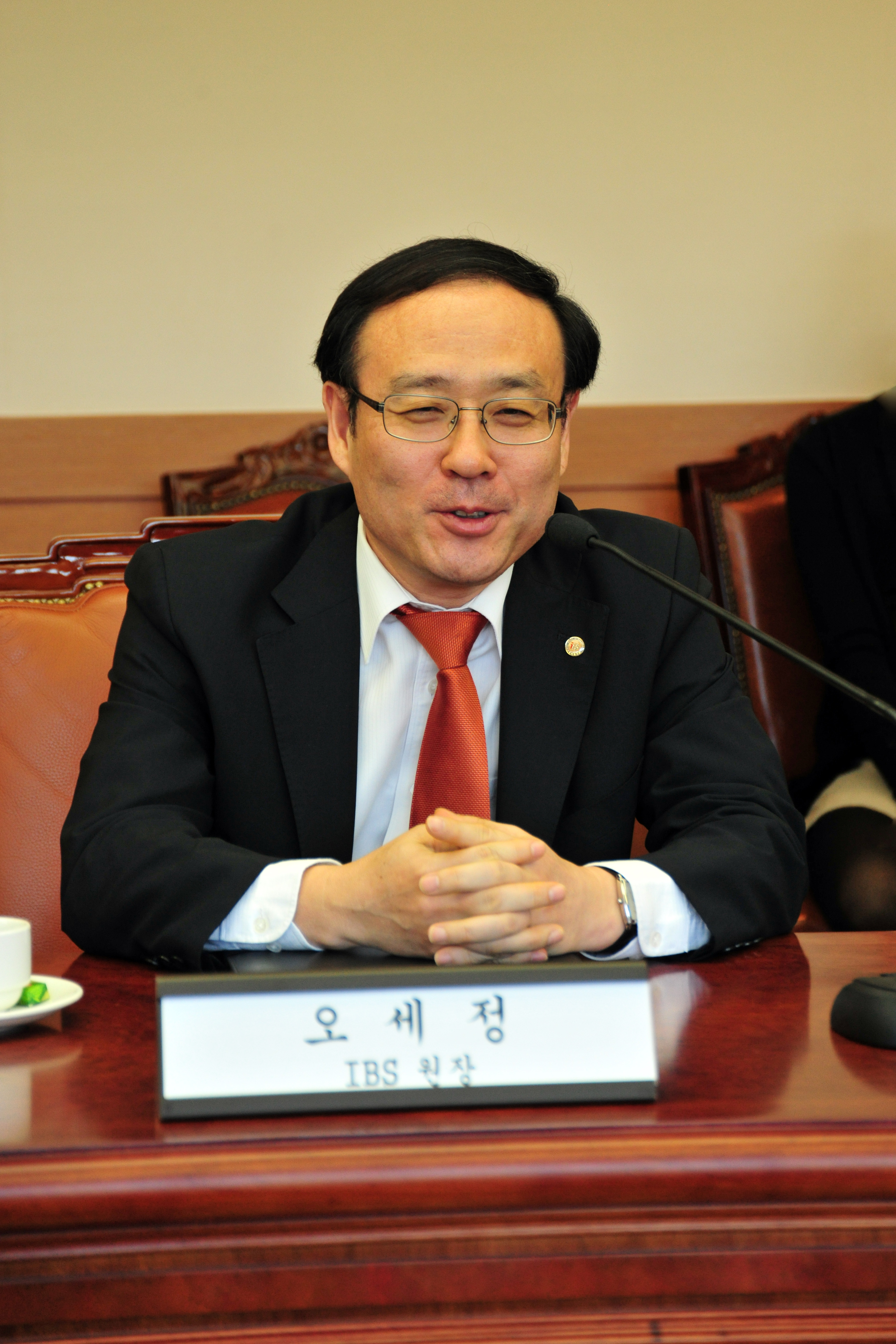
- Born: February 17, 1954 (age 72); Seoul, South Korea
- Education: Seoul National University (BS); Stanford University (MS, PhD)
- Scientific career
- Fields: Physics
- Workplaces: Xerox, Seoul National University, Ministry of Science and Technology, Korean Federation of Science and Technology Societies, National Research Foundation of Korea, Institute for Basic Science, National Assembly

Korean name
- Hangul: 오세정
- Hanja: 吳世正
- RR: O Sejeong
- MR: O Sejŏng

Oh Se-jung (Korean: 오세정; born February 17, 1954) is a South Korean politician and physicist. He has served as the director of the Korean Federation of Science and Technology Societies, the first president of the Institute for Basic Science, and the 27th president of Seoul National University.

== Education ==
Oh entered Kyunggi High School of Gangnam District in 1968 and graduated in 1971. He next graduated from Seoul National University in 1975 with a Bachelor of Physics. Moving to the U.S., he did a combined M.S. and Ph.D. in physics at Stanford University graduating in 1981.

== Career ==
Staying in California, Oh worked as a researcher at the Palo Alto Institute of Xerox until 1984, in which he returned to Korea to work as a professor at the Department of Physics and Astronomy in Seoul National University (SNU). He then worked as a research at the International Center for Theoretical Physics from 1987. During this time, he was a visiting researcher and professor at the University of Michigan and University of Tokyo, respectively. Returning to SNU, he was the head of the Planning Lab under the College of National Sciences. He later served as the director of the Multi-Systems Research Center for Excellence of the Ministry of Science and Technology with the last several years overlapping as the director and later vice chairman of the Korean Federation of Science and Technology Societies. His next position was as the founding president of the Institute for Basic Science. He left to pursue the president's office at SNU, where he scored highly in the policy evaluation before losing to Sung Nak-in, who became the 26th president of SNU. Oh worked in politics before again applying for and eventually getting the position at SNU as the 27th president He was inaugurated on February 8, 2019, while also becoming the 10th chairman of the (Seoul National University Foundation).

== Awards ==
- 2003: Scientists Worth Emulating, Korea Science Foundation
- 1997: Korea Science Award
- 1994: Outstanding Paper, Korea Federation of Science and Technology Societies

== See also ==
- Kim Doochul
- Noh Do Young
