= Yun Il-seon =

Korean academic (1896–1987)

Yun Il-seon (윤일선)
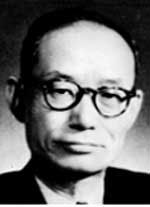
- Yun Il-seon in 1956.
- Born: October 5, 1896; Tokyo, Empire of Japan
- Died: June 22, 1987 (aged 90); Jongno District, Seoul, South Korea
- Occupations: Politician, pathologist, anatomist
- Children: Yun Seok-gu, Yun Tak-gu, Yun Yong-koo
- Parent(s): Yun Chi-oh, Lee Suk-kyung

Yun Il-seon (Korean: 윤일선; Hanja: 尹日善, October 5, 1896 – June 22, 1987) was a South Korean politician, pathologist, and anatomist. He was the 6th Chairman of University of Seoul 1956 to 1961, a pathology pupil of Fuzinami Ahkira (藤浪鑑), successor of Rudolf Virchow, and cousin of president Yun Bo-seon. A nickname was Dongho (동호; 東湖).

== Biography ==
Yun was an early modern pathologist and anatomist of Korea. Yun majored in pathology in Japan during the 1920s, and then returned to Korea to become an assistant professor at Keijō Imperial University. At Keijō Imperial University and Severance Medical College, he took the lead in the introduction and development of pathology and also basic medicine, through publications of experimental research and education.

After Korea's liberation from Japanese colonization in 1945, Yun contributed to South KoreaSouth Korea pathology and anatomy education. He was vice chancellor of Seoul National University until 1954 and in 1956, and subsequently served as sixth chancellor of the university until 1960. He was awarded the Sudang Award in 1976.
