= Zhou Ji (politician, born 1964) =

Chinese politician

- 周霁

Director of the Liaison Office of the Central People's Government in Hong Kong
- Incumbent
- Assumed office 30 May 2025
- Premier: Li Qiang
- Preceded by: Zheng Yanxiong

Vice Governor of Henan
- In office January 2021 – October 2021
- Preceded by: Huang Qiang
- Succeeded by: Sun Shougang

Communist Party Secretary of Yichang
- In office December 2016 – December 2020
- Preceded by: Huang Chuping
- Succeeded by: Wang Li

Communist Party Secretary of Shiyan
- In office May 2012 – December 2016
- Preceded by: Chen Tianhui
- Succeeded by: Zhang Weiguo

Mayor of Shiyan
- In office June 2010 – August 2012
- Preceded by: Zhang Siyi
- Succeeded by: Zhang Weiguo

Personal details
- Born: May 1964 (age 62) Xiangyang, Hubei, China
- Party: Chinese Communist Party
- Education: Hubei University of Technology; Wuhan University; Huazhong University of Science and Technology

Zhou Ji (Chinese: 周霁; born May 1964) is a Chinese politician and member of the Chinese Communist Party (CCP), who is currently serving as the served as director of the Hong Kong Liaison Office and secretary of the Hong Kong Work Committee of the Chinese Communist Party since May 2025.

== Early life ==
Zhou was born on May 1964 in Xiangyang city in Hubei, China.

== Political career ==
After graduating from Hubei University of Technology in 1984, Zhou began his career in Xiangyang, where he held a series of positions in the municipal machinery industry. During nearly two decades in the sector, he worked in government administration and state-owned enterprises, rising from a local bureau official to chairman of Xiangzhou Bearing Group Corporation. He also completed part-time studies in law at Wuhan University and later earned a master's degree in electronic and communication engineering from Huazhong University of Science and Technology.

In 2004, he was appointed Communist Party secretary of Gucheng County in Hubei. Later that year, he joined the Standing Committee of the Xiangyang Municipal Committee of the Chinese Communist Party. In 2006, he was transferred to serve as Communist Party secretary of Xiantao. In June 2010, Zhou was appointed acting mayor of Shiyan and was formally elected mayor later that year. He became Communist Party secretary of Shiyan in May 2012. Four years later, he joined the Standing Committee of the Hubei Provincial Committee of the Chinese Communist Party while concurrently serving as Communist Party secretary of Yichang. In December 2020, Zhou was transferred to Henan, where he became a member of the provincial Party standing committee and deputy secretary of the provincial government's Party leadership group. He was appointed Executive Vice Governor of Henan in January 2021 and was promoted to deputy Communist Party secretary of Henan in October that year. The following month, he also became secretary of the Henan Provincial Political and Legal Affairs Commission.

In July 2023, Zhou was appointed executive deputy director of the Hong Kong and Macau Work Office of the Central Committee of the Chinese Communist Party, a ministerial-level position. On 30 May 2025, Zhou was appointed director of the Liaison Office of the Central People's Government in the Hong Kong Special Administrative Region, succeeding Zheng Yanxiong. He also concurrently assumed the role of National Security Adviser to the Committee for Safeguarding National Security of the Hong Kong Special Administrative Region. Zhou's appointment followed the unexpected removal of Zheng, whose departure was announced without an official explanation. Chief Executive of Hong Kong John Lee described the leadership change as a "normal" personnel adjustment, while Reuters reported, citing a source familiar with the matter, that Zheng's removal may have been linked to Beijing's dissatisfaction over the proposed sale of CK Hutchison's global ports business. Chinese authorities did not publicly confirm the reported reason for the reshuffle.

Party political offices
| Preceded by Zheng Yanxiong | Secretary of the Hong Kong Work Committee of the Chinese Communist Party; 2025– | Incumbent |
| Preceded by Huang Chuping | Communist Party Secretary of Yichang; 2016–2020 | Succeeded by Wang Li |
| Preceded by Chen Tianhui | Communist Party Secretary of Shiyan; 2012–2016 | Succeeded by Zhang Weiguo |
Government offices
| Preceded by Zheng Yanxiong | Director the Office for Safeguarding National Security of the CPG in the HKSAR; 2025-present | Incumbent |
| Preceded by Zhang Siyi | Mayor of Shiyan; 2010-2012 | Succeeded by Zhang Weiguo |
