= Zhou Ji (engineer) =

Chinese engineer

- 周济
- Born: 10 February 1962 (age 64); Jiutai County, Jilin, China
- Education: Jilin University; Peking University
- Scientific career
- Fields: Inorganic nonmetallic materials
- Workplaces: Tsinghua University

Chinese name
- Simplified Chinese: 周济
- Traditional Chinese: 周濟
Transcriptions
Standard Mandarin
- Hanyu Pinyin: Zhōu Jì

Zhou Ji (born 10 February 1962) is a Chinese engineer who is a professor at Tsinghua University, and an academician of the Chinese Academy of Engineering.

== Biography ==
Zhou was born in Jiutai County (now Jiutai District of Changchun), Jilin, on 10 February 1962. He attended Jilin University where he received his bachelor's degree in semiconductor chemistry in 1983. After completing his master's degree at the Changchun Institute of Physics, Chinese Academy of Sciences in 1986, he attended Peking University where he obtained his doctor's degree in inorganic chemistry in 1988. He was a postdoctoral fellow at Tsinghua University between 1991 and 1993.

He was appointed associate professor of Tsinghua University, in 1993, becoming deputy director of the Department of Materials in 1997 and full professor in 1998. He was honored as a Distinguished Young Scholar by the National Science Fund for Distinguished Young Scholars in 2004. He was appointed as a "Chang Jiang Scholar" (or " Yangtze River Scholar") by the Ministry of Education of the People's Republic of China in 2007.

== Honours and awards ==
- 2005 State Technological Invention Award (Second Class)
- 2016 State Natural Science Award (Second Class)
- 27 November 2017 Member of the Chinese Academy of Engineering (CAE)
