= Hubei University of Technology =

University in Wuhan, China

- 湖北工业大学
- Motto: 厚德、博学、求实、创新 (Virtue, Knowledge, Truth, Innovation)
- Type: Public
- Established: 1952
- President: Song Xiaochun
- Academic staff: 1,600+
- Students: 28,000+
- Undergraduates: 20,000+
- Postgraduates: 8,000+
- Location: Wuhan, Hubei, China
- Campus: Urban, 1,600 mu (approx. 106 hectares)
- Website: www.hbut.edu.cn

Hubei University of Technology (HBUT; Chinese: 湖北工业大学) is a provincial public multi-disciplinary university located in Wuhan, Hubei, China. Administered by the Hubei Provincial People's Government, the university is distinguished by its engineering disciplines and has been included in the "Double First-Class" initiative of Hubei Province, as well as the national "Basic Capacity Building Project for Universities in the Central and Western Regions."

The university traces its roots back to 1952 with the establishment of Wuchang Agricultural School. In 1984, the Hubei Light Industry College and the Hubei Agricultural Machinery College merged to form the Hubei Institute of Technology. In 2004, the institution was officially renamed Hubei University of Technology. In 2018, it was authorized to grant doctoral degrees.

As of 2026, HBUT covers an area of over 1,600 mu (about 106 hectares) with a total building area of 1.1 million square meters. It consists of 18 academic schools offering 58 undergraduate programs, enrolling more than 20,000 full-time undergraduate students, over 8,000 postgraduate and doctoral students, and around 700 international students.

== History ==
The modern Hubei University of Technology was formed primarily through the amalgamation of two educational lineages: the agricultural machinery stream and the light industry stream.

=== Agricultural Machinery Stream ===
In the autumn of 1952, the Hubei provincial government established the Wuchang Agricultural School. Over the following years, several related institutions were created in Wuchang, including the Wuchang Agricultural Mechanization School and the Wuchang Animal Husbandry and Veterinary School. In 1957, these schools were merged to form the Hubei Provincial Agricultural School, which was upgraded the following year to the Hubei Agricultural Machinery College. After a brief period of merging with the Wuhan Institute of Technology (now Wuhan University of Technology) in 1970, it re-established its independent identity in 1979 as a specialized college focused on agricultural mechanization.

=== Light Industry Stream ===
In 1956, the Ministry of Food Industry established the Wuhan Food Industry Accounting School. After multiple administrative changes and mergers with other technical schools (such as chemical and construction schools), it evolved into the Hubei Provincial Light Industry School. In 1978, following the resumption of the National College Entrance Examination (Gaokao), the Hubei Light Industry College was formally established, offering bachelor's degree programs.

=== Merger and Recent Development ===
In August 1984, the Hubei Light Industry College and the Hubei Agricultural Machinery College were merged to establish the Hubei Institute of Technology (湖北工学院). The institute quickly developed its graduate programs, gaining the authority to grant master's degrees in 1986.

In May 2004, the Ministry of Education approved the renaming of the institution to Hubei University of Technology (HBUT). Over the subsequent decade, several provincial research institutes, including the Hubei Provincial Academy of Agricultural Machinery Engineering, were integrated into the university.

In 2011, HBUT was selected for the Ministry of Education's "Excellent Engineer Education and Training Plan." In May 2018, the university was granted the authority to award doctoral degrees by the Academic Degrees Committee of the State Council. Recently, HBUT has established several forward-looking academic departments, including the School of Big Data and Artificial Intelligence (2021) and the nation's first School of Digital Arts Industry (2022).

== Academics ==
=== Schools and Departments ===
As of 2026, HBUT is organized into 18 schools and teaching departments, covering disciplines in engineering, science, arts, economics, management, and literature:

- School of Mechanical Engineering (School of Intelligent Manufacturing Industry)
- School of Electrical and Electronic Engineering
- School of Materials and Chemical Engineering
- School of Life Sciences and Health Engineering
- School of Civil Engineering, Architecture and Environment
- School of Computer Science (School of Big Data and Artificial Intelligence)
- School of Digital Arts Industry
- School of Art and Design
- School of Industrial Design
- School of Economics and Management
- School of Foreign Languages
- School of Science (School of Chip Industry)
- School of Vocational and Technical Education
- International College
- Detroit Green Technology Institute (Sino-US joint programs)
- School of Marxism
- School of Physical Education
- School of Innovation and Entrepreneurship

=== Degree Programs ===
The university offers 58 undergraduate programs. At the postgraduate level, it has 1 Postdoctoral Research Station (Light Industry Technology and Engineering), 5 first-tier disciplines authorized to confer Doctoral degrees, and over 20 first-tier disciplines authorized to confer Master's degrees. Six of its disciplines rank in the top 1% globally in the Essential Science Indicators (ESI).

=== International Cooperation ===
HBUT maintains cooperative relationships with more than 240 universities and research institutes across over 50 countries, including the United States, United Kingdom, Germany, and Canada. Notably, it co-established the world's first Green Technology Confucius Institute in collaboration with the University of Venda in South Africa.

== Research ==
Hubei University of Technology is a major research hub in Hubei Province, particularly in the fields of light industry, agricultural machinery, and green manufacturing. The university hosts several high-level research platforms:

- National and Ministry Level: The "Belt and Road" Joint Laboratory (Ministry of Science and Technology), the Key Laboratory of Fermentation Engineering (Ministry of Education), and the Key Laboratory of River and Lake Health Smart Perception and Ecological Restoration.
- Provincial Level: 7 Hubei Provincial Key Laboratories (including Industrial Microbiology, Modern Manufacturing Quality Engineering, and Green Light Industrial Materials), alongside dozens of engineering technology research centers and university-enterprise collaborative innovation centers.

HBUT publishes several esteemed academic journals, including China Mechanical Engineering (中国机械工程) and the Journal of Hubei University of Technology.

== Campus ==
The main campus is located on Nanli Road in the Hongshan District of Wuhan, situated near the Xunsi River. It spans an area of roughly 106 hectares. The campus features notable cultural landmarks, such as the "Industrial Culture Corridor," which visually connects five historical eras of industrial development, and the Xunsi River landscape belt.

== Notable alumni ==
Over its 70-year history, HBUT has produced numerous prominent figures in politics, academia, and business:

- Politics and Government:
  - Zhou Ji, Deputy Director of the Hong Kong and Macao Work Office of the CPC Central Committee and Director of the Liaison Office in Hong Kong.
  - Dong Weimin, Alternate Member of the 20th CPC Central Committee and Vice Governor of Sichuan Province.
  - Wang Youguo, former Party Secretary of Daxing District, Beijing.
- Academia and Engineering:
  - Ji Daobin, lead developer of the flight data recorder for the Shenzhou program.
  - Zhang Xiaoxing, Professor and Doctoral Supervisor at Chongqing University.
  - Sun Xianfang, Professor at the School of Automation Science and Electrical Engineering, Beihang University.
- Business:
  - Yang Hongchun, Chairman of Bestore Co., Ltd. (良品铺子).
  - Shao Yaliang, President of Shanghai International Group.
  - Zhang Meihua, Chairman and CEO of Tongjitang Group.
