= Korea Science Award =

South Korean award

- Country: South Korea
- First award: 1987
- Website: National Research Foundation of Korea

- Korea Science Award
- Hangul: 한국과학상
- Hanja: 韓國科學賞
- RR: Hanguk gwahaksang
- MR: Han'guk kwahaksang

The Korea Science Award (Korean: 한국과학상) is an award presented to South Koreans and Korean scientists working in domestic universities or research positions. It is currently jointly presented by the Ministry of Science and ICT and the National Research Foundation of Korea. Research achievements are limited to that of a single project conducted in Korea. Potential recipients go through a several stage review which includes consolation with foreign scholars.

From 1987, it was biennially awarded to frequently three to four recipients. From 2016, it is given annually to two individuals while two other individuals are presented with the Korea Engineering Award. The Korea Science Award comes with a presidential commendation and a research grant of 30 million won, down from 50 million given in the past. For certain years, there is not a winner from certain fields.

== Recipients ==
Year	Mathematics	Physics	Chemistry	Life science
1987	Bak Yongmun (박용문); Gi Uhang (기우항)	Kim Jihn-eui (김진의); Ok Hangnam (옥항남)	Seo Jeongheon (서정헌)	Bak Sangdae (박상대)
1989	Kim Jongsik (김종식)	Jo Yongmin (조용민)	Sim Sangcheol (심상철)	Lee Ho Wang (이호왕)
1991	–	Park Yung-woo (박영우)	Jin Jeongil (진정일)	Jeong Jinha (정진하)
1993	–	–	Seo Jeongheon (서정헌); Kim Seonggak (김성각)	Im Jeongbin 임정빈)
1995	Choe Jaegyeong (최재경)	Ihm Jisoon (임지순)	Kim Myeongsu (김명수)	Kim Yusam (김유삼)
1997	–	Oh Se-jung (오세정)	Lee Eun (이은)	–
1999	–	Jang Giju (장기주)	Choe Jinho (최진호)	Jo Muje (조무제)
2001	Hwang Jun-Muk (황준묵)	Choe Muyeong (최무영)	Kim Kimoon (김기문)	Choe Uiju (최의주)
2003	Chae Dongho (채동호)	Noh Tae-won (노태원)	Kim Gwangsu (김광수)	Kim Sung-hoon (김성훈)
2005	Gang Seokjin (강석진)	Lee Seongik (이성익)	Kim Dongho (김동호)	Nam Hong Gil (남홍길)
2007	Geum Jonghae (금종해)	Lee Sujong (이수종)	Baek Myeonghyeon (백명현)	Oh Byeongha (오병하)
2009	Gang Hyeonbae (강현배)	Lee Yonghui (이용희)	Yoon Kyung-byung (윤경병)	Oh Uhtaek (오우택)
2011	Bak Jongil (박종일)	Choe Giun (최기운)	–	Roe Jung-hye (노정혜)
2013	–	Chang Sukbok (장석복)	Kim Daesik (김대식)	Seo Yeongjun (서영준)
2015	Lee Yeongjo (이영조)	Yeom Han-woong (염한웅)	Nam Wonu (남원우)	–
2016	–	Park Je-Geun (박제근)	–	Im Daesik (임대식)
2017	Ha Seungyeol (하승열)	–	Seok Sangil (석상일)	–
2018	–	Lee Takhee (이탁희)	–	Lee Yeongsuk (이영숙)
2019	Oh Yong-Geun (오용근)	–	An Jihun (안지훈)	–
2020	Kim Beomsik (김범식)	–	Bak Gyuhwan (박규환)	–
2021	Kim Ingang (김인강)	Kim Yunho (김윤호)	Lee Taeeok (이태억)	Lee Taeu (이태우)
2022	–	Jeong Hyunsik (정현식)	–	Kim Jong Seung (김종승)
2023	–	Kim Changyoung (김창영)	–	Changjoon Justin Lee (이창준)
2024	–	–	Sun Woong (선웅)	Yoon Juyoung (윤주영)
Year	Mathematics	Physics	Chemistry	Life science
