= Korea Institute for Advanced Study =

Research institute of mathematics and physics from Seoul

- Formation: 1996
- Type: Governmental organisation
- Headquarters: Seoul, South Korea
- Location: 85 Hoegiro, Dongdaemun-gu, Seoul, South Korea 02455
- Coordinates: 37.5928°N 127.0458°E
- President: Noh Tae-won
- Website: www.kias.re.kr

- Korea Institute for Advanced Study
- Hangul: 고등과학원
- Hanja: 高等科學院
- RR: Godeunggwahagwon
- MR: Kodŭnggwahagwŏn

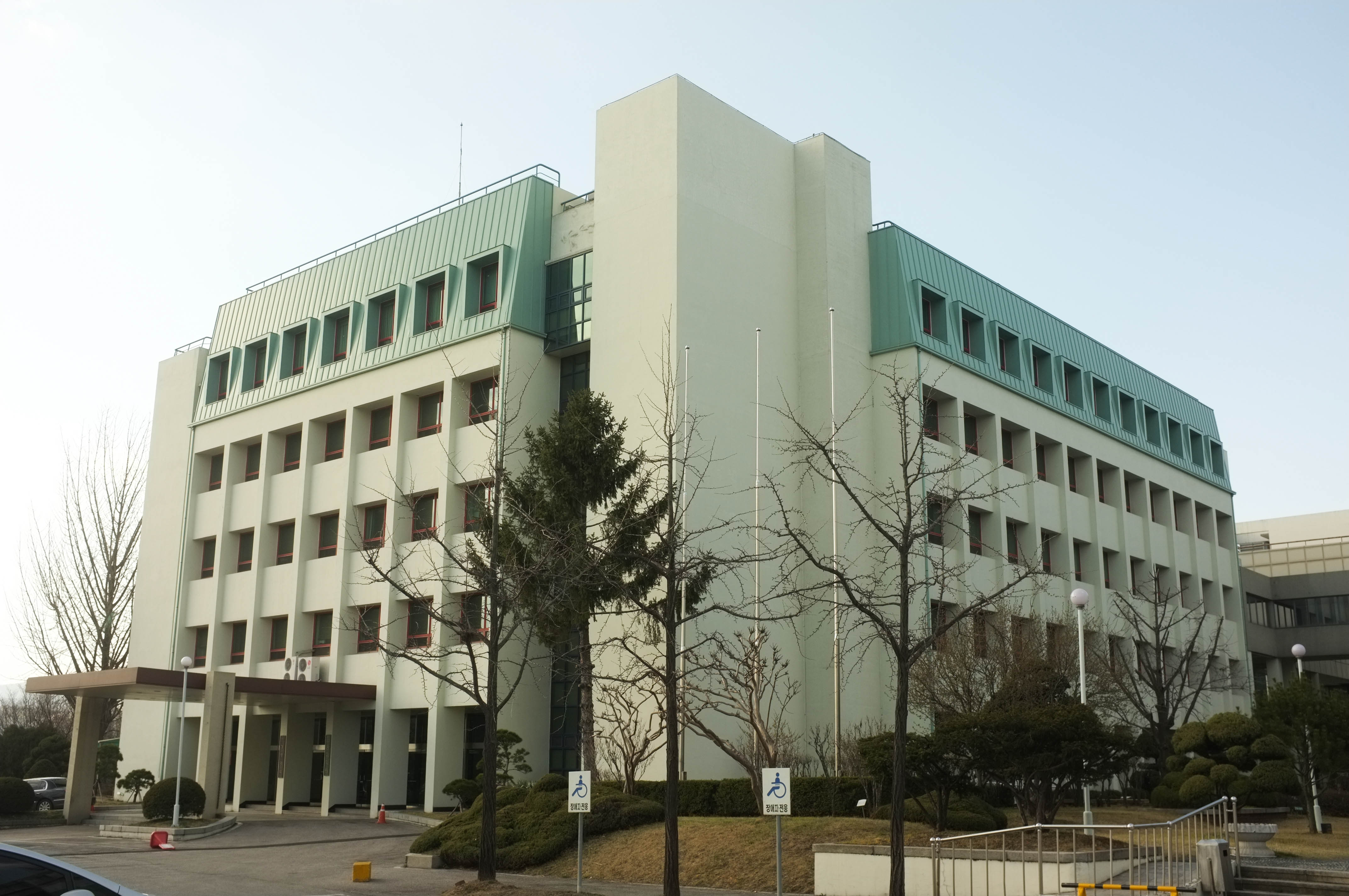
The building of the Korea Institute for Advanced Study (KIAS)

The Korea Institute for Advanced Study (KIAS; Korean: 고등과학원) is an advanced research institute in South Korea. It is located on a 30-acre (12 ha) campus in Dongdaemun-gu, Seoul.

KIAS was founded in 1996, aiming to become a world leading research institute where international elite scholars gather and dedicate to fundamental research in basic sciences. Currently, there are three schools in the institute: mathematics, physics, and computational sciences. As of 2016, the institute has 3 distinguished professors, 26 professors, and 133 research fellows.

As its name suggests, the institute was modeled after the Institute for Advanced Study in Princeton, New Jersey, USA. KIAS is funded by the government and is a subordinate institute of KAIST.

== Presidents ==
- 1st and 2nd: Kim Chung Wook
- 3rd: Kim Mahn Won
- 4th: Myung Hyo Chul (ko)
- 5th: Kim Doochul
- 6th: Keum Jonghae
- 7th: Lee Yong-hee
- 8th: Choe Jaigyoung
- 9th: Noh Tae-won

== See also ==
- Institute for Basic Science
- National Institute for Mathematical Sciences
