= Institute for Basic Science =

Science institute in South Korea

- 기초과학연구원
- Formation: November 21, 2011
- Type: Governmental organisation
- Purpose: Basic science research
- Headquarters: Daejeon, South Korea
- Location: 55, Expo-ro, Yuseong-gu, Daejeon, South Korea
- Coordinates: 36.375959°N 127.385751°E
- President: Chang Sukbok
- Main organ: IBS Research Centers
- Budget: 260 million USD (FY2015)
- Staff: 1,800 researchers and students
- Website: www.ibs.re.kr

- Institute for Basic Science
- Hangul: 기초과학연구원
- Hanja: 基礎科學硏究院
- RR: Gicho gwahak yeonguwon
- MR: Kich'o kwahak yŏn'guwŏn

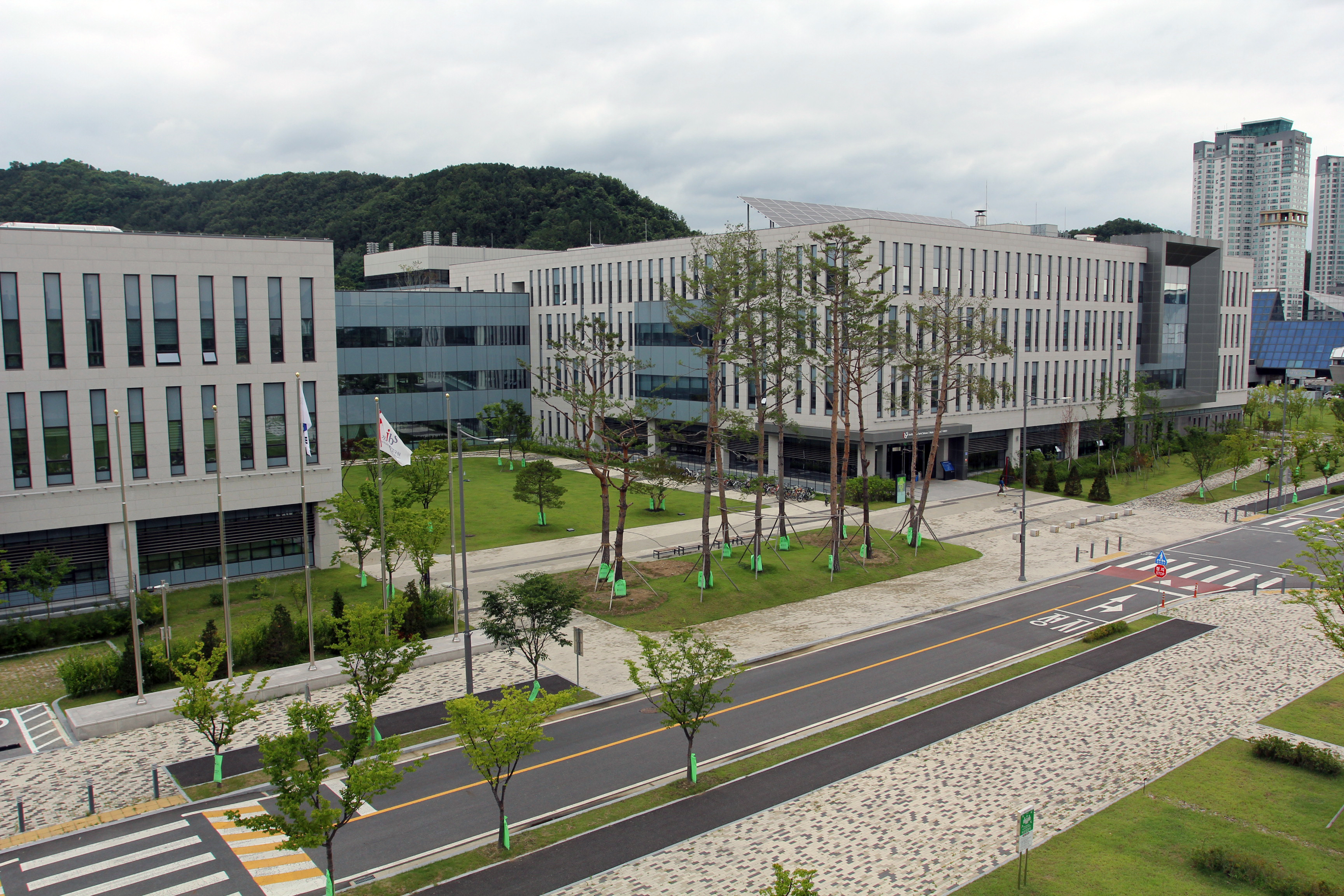
Institute for Basic Science headquarters entrance following relocation in January 2018.

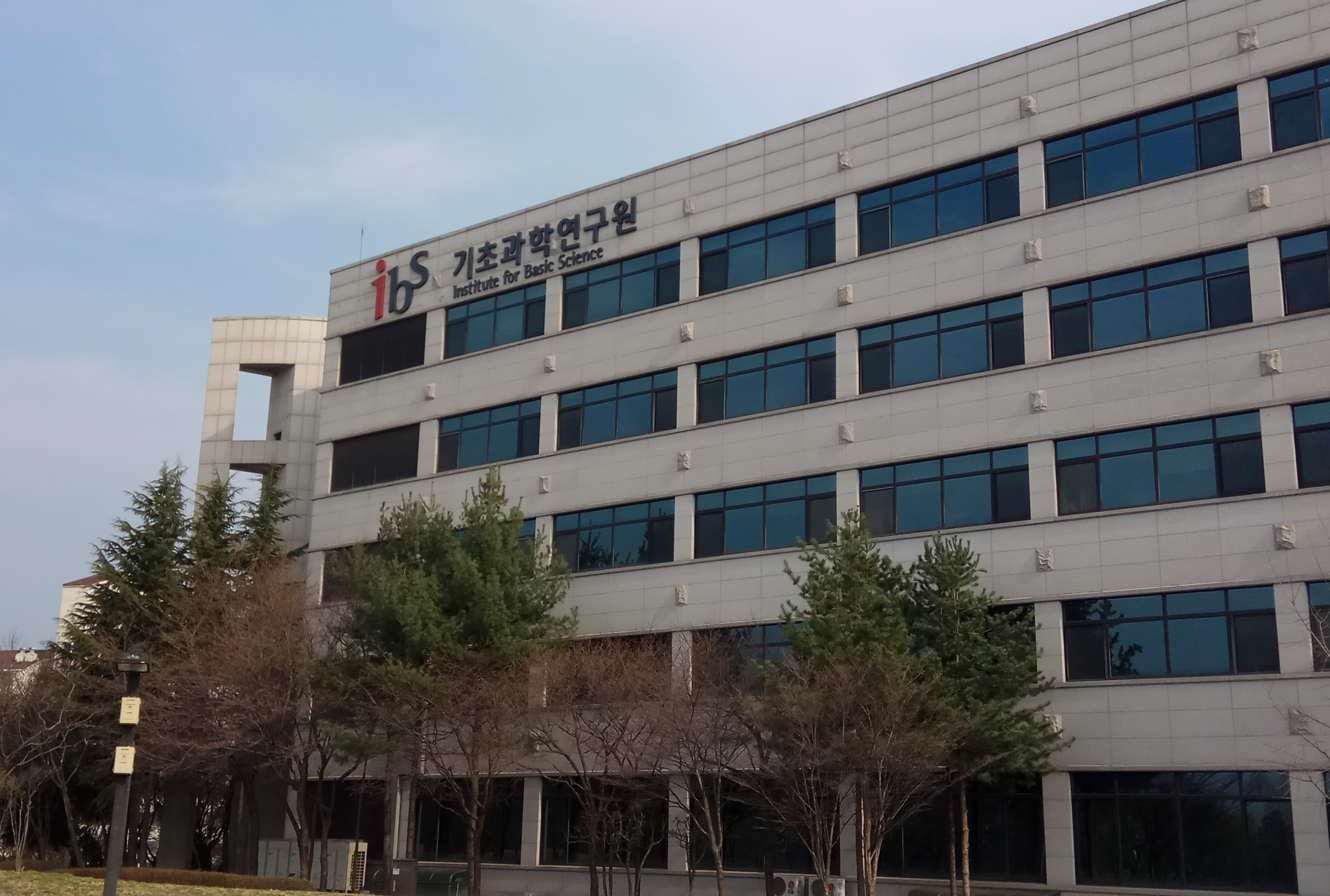
Institute for Basic Science prior to relocation in January 2018.

The Institute for Basic Science (IBS; Korean: 기초과학연구원) is a Korean government-funded research institute that conducts basic science research and relevant pure basic research. Comprising approximately 30 research centers with more than 60 research groups across the nation and a headquarters in Daejeon, IBS has approximately 1,800 researchers and doctoral course students. Around 30% of the researchers are from countries other than South Korea. The organization is under the Ministry of Science and ICT.

== History ==
IBS was established in November 2011 by the Lee Myung-bak administration as a research institute, later a core of the International Science and Business Belt (ISBB) upon relocation of their headquarters from a rented property to their own campus in January 2018 using land reclaimed from the Taejŏn Expo '93 in Expo Science Park. The Institute is often referred to as the 'Nobel Prize project' of the nation, as obtaining that award was a clear goal behind the founding.

In 2011, the Korean government announced an investment of more than 2 trillion KRW (roughly US$2 billion) to build a heavy ion accelerator facility, named RAON, in northern Daejeon by 2021 before getting pushed back to 2025. The facility is expected to be the world's first device using both the isotope separator on-line (ISOL) and in-flight (IF) methods.

In 2018, it was noted that the largest share of Clarivate Highly Cited Researchers in Korea are affiliated with IBS. In that same year, the IBS Center for Climate Physics, headed by Axel Timmermann, began to use a 1.43-petaflop Cray XC50 supercomputer, named Aleph, for climate physics research. In late 2023, a new supercomputer, Olaf, was ranked 10th on the Green500.

As of January 2020, there are 30 centers operating in various fields of science including 6 in chemistry, 6 in life science, 5 in interdisciplinary science, 10 in physics, 1 in Earth science, and 2 in mathematics.

In late 2023, the Second Basic Science Research Institute Construction Plan (2023–2030) was established which will expand the headquarters and construct an IBS research building at UNIST, GIST, DGIST and KAIST. Estimated completion dates are 2025 for headquarters, 2026 for UNIST, and 2030 for GIST, DGIST and KAIST. Total costs are budgeted at KRW 309 billion, which is in addition to the KRW 324.5 billion for an IBS building at both KAIST and POSTECH under the First Plan.

=== List of IBS presidents ===
- Oh Se-jung (November 25, 2011–February 2014) PhD in physics from Stanford University, Professor in the Department of Physics and Astronomy at Seoul National University, and 2nd President of the National Research Foundation of Korea
- Kim Doochul (September 2014–September 2019) PhD in electrical engineering from Johns Hopkins University, Professor in the Department of Physics at Seoul National University, and 5th President of the Korea Institute for Advanced Study
- Noh Do Young (November 22, 2019–November 20, 2025) PhD in physics from Massachusetts Institute of Technology, Professor in the Department of Physics and Photon Science at Gwangju Institute of Science and Technology (GIST), director of the Center for Advanced X-ray Science, president of Korea Synchrotron Radiation User's Association, dean of GIST College
- Chang Sukbok (June 4, 2026–current) PhD in organic chemistry from Harvard University, distinguished professor in the Department of Chemistry at Korea Advanced Institute of Science and Technology (KAIST), director of the IBS Center for Catalytic Hydrocarbon Functionalizations

== Organizational structure ==
IBS consists primarily of a headquarters (HQ) and secondary units in the form of research centers. IBS plans to establish a total of 50 research centers, employing 3,000 people.

IBS research centers are divided into several categories: HQ, campus, extramural, and pioneer research. HQ Centers' research groups are affiliated solely with IBS. Campus Centers are based in the nation's science and technology universities (KAIST, DGIST, UNIST, GIST and POSTECH). Extramural Centers are based in universities other than science and technology universities (Seoul National University, Sungkyunkwan University, Korea University, Yonsei University, Ewha Womans University, and Pusan National University). Pioneer Research Centers (PRC) are headquarters-based centers headed not by a director, but by a group of up to five chief investigators.

The centers are located at IBS HQ in Daejeon and relevant universities in Seoul, Suwon, Daegu, Ulsan, Pohang, Busan, Daejeon, and Gwangju. The annual budget for each center ranges from 2 to US$10 million. Once launched, centers run with no fixed time frame to conduct their research.

There are two affiliated organizations: the National Institute for Mathematical Sciences (NIMS), and the Rare Isotope Science Project (RISP).

== Educational Programs ==
IBS School, University of Science and Technology

IBS School is a graduate program jointly founded by IBS and the University of Science and Technology (UST) in Korea. The school opened in September 2015 to foster young scientists in basic science by using HQ Centers' facilities.

IBS Young Scientist Fellowship (YSF)

IBS has been running this program since 2013 to provide opportunities for early career researchers (postdocs with less than 5 years' experience or those under the age of 40 with a PhD) to gain research experience by carrying out independent research within IBS centers.

== See also ==
- Riken
- Max Planck Society
- Korea Institute for Advanced Study
- Facility for Rare Isotope Beams
- On-Line Isotope Mass Separator
- Okinawa Institute of Science and Technology Graduate University
