= Korean Physical Society =

Non-profit in Busan, South Korea

- Hangul: 한국물리학회
- Hanja: 韓國物理學會
- Revised Romanization: Hanguk mulli hakhoe
- McCune–Reischauer: Han'guk mulli hakhoe

The Korean Physical Society is a non-profit scientific society created to provide a forum for academic exchange among scholars and researchers in the field of Physics.

The organization, was founded in Busan in 1952 during the Korean War. In 2020, membership levels were around 15,000. Within the organization, there are twelve topic-specific divisions, including Particle and Field Physics, Atomic and Molecular Physics, and Astrophysics.

The society publishes several journals, including its flagship Journal of the Korean Physical Society, published by Springer Publishing. The journal covers all fields of physics, ranging from statistical physics and condensed matter physics to particle physics.

The Korean Physical Society has Memorandums of Understanding (MOUs) with several other scientific associations, including the Japan Society of Applied Physics and the American Physical Society.
