= Gwangju Institute of Science and Technology =

University in South Korea

Gwangju Institute of Science and Technology (GIST)
- Motto: A Proud Creator of Future Science and Technology
- Type: National
- Established: 1993
- President: Kichul Lim (임기철)
- Students: 2,733 (as of March 2026)
- Undergraduates: 1,275 (as of March 2026)
- Postgraduates: 1,458 (as of March 2026)
- Location: 123 Cheomdan-gwagiro (Oryong-dong), Buk-gu, Gwangju, South Korea; 35.2265°N 126.8400°E
- Website: gist.ac.kr

Korean name
- Hangul: 광주과학기술원
- Hanja: 光州科學技術院
- RR: Gwangju gwahak gisurwon
- MR: Kwangju kwahak kisurwŏn

The Gwangju Institute of Science and Technology (GIST) is a public research university and institute of technology that was established in 1993 by a legislative act of the National Assembly of the Republic of Korea with its primary purpose to advance national science and technology through education, research, and international and industrial cooperation.

Located in Gwangju, South Korea, GIST is recognized for its high research impact, consistently ranking among the top five globally in the "Citations per Faculty" category of the QS World University Rankings for nearly two decades. Following its 30th anniversary in 2023, the institute launched the "Vision 2053" initiative, which aims to position GIST as a top 50 global university by 2053 with a specialized focus on artificial intelligence and robotics. To facilitate the commercialization of its research, the institute established GIST Holdings in late 2023, a dedicated investment and technology transfer wing designed to foster a "Deep-tech" startup ecosystem in the Gwangju region.

== STAR-MOOC and International Enrollment ==
GIST is a founding member of STAR-MOOC (Science & Technology Advanced Research Massive Open Online Course), a collaborative online educational platform launched in 2018. The initiative is a joint effort between South Korea's primary science and technology universities, including KAIST, GIST, DGIST, UNIST, POSTECH, and the UST.

As a member of this group, GIST is designated under the South Korean Ministry of Justice's K-STAR Visa Track (F-2-7S). This program provides a fast-track residency pathway for international students who obtain a master's or doctoral degree at GIST. Eligible graduates may receive a residence visa (F-2) via a recommendation from the university president, bypassing certain general employment requirements, and are eligible to apply for permanent residency (F-5) after three years.

== History ==
=== Establishment and early years (1993–2000) ===
The Gwangju Institute of Science and Technology (GIST) was established by the South Korean government on August 5, 1993, following the enactment of the Gwangju Institute of Science and Technology Act."Gwangju Institute of Science and Technology Act". Korea Legislation Research Institute. Founded as a research-oriented graduate school, its primary mission was to foster highly skilled scientists and create a strong research and development (R&D) base for advanced technology in Korea.

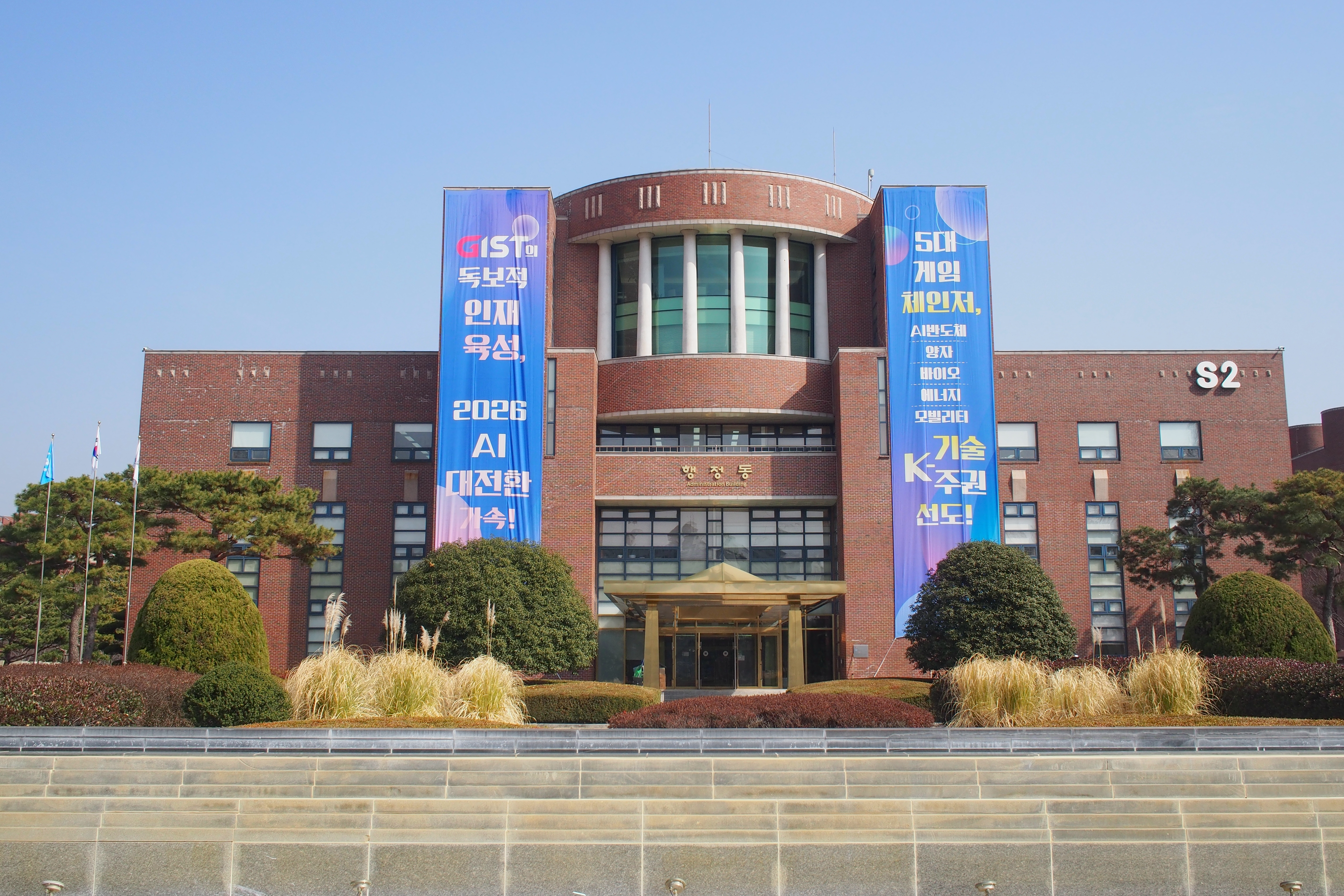
GIST Administrative Building

On October 11, 1993, Dr. Doo-Bong Ha was inaugurated as the university's first president. The institute conferred its first master's degrees on February 27, 1997, and its first doctoral degrees on February 20, 2000.

=== Expansion and rebranding (2001–2009) ===
In 2001, GIST became the first university in South Korea to introduce a "thesis quality certification program," which mandated that doctoral candidates publish in high-impact journals before graduation. On March 26, 2004, the university officially changed its English acronym from KJIST (Kwangju Institute of Science and Technology) to GIST, following the revised Romanization of the city's name from Kwangju to Gwangju.

In May 2008, an amendment to the GIST Act was passed by the National Assembly, authorizing the establishment of an undergraduate program to create a continuous science education track from bachelor's to doctoral levels."History of GIST". Gwangju Institute of Science and Technology.

=== Undergraduate education and global recognition (2010–2018) ===
GIST College, the university's undergraduate school, admitted its first class of 100 students in March 2010. The college implemented a liberal arts-based science curriculum, a first for technical institutes in South Korea. The first bachelor's degrees were conferred on February 25, 2014."GIST holds 2024 Commencement Ceremony". NewsWorker. 21 February 2024.

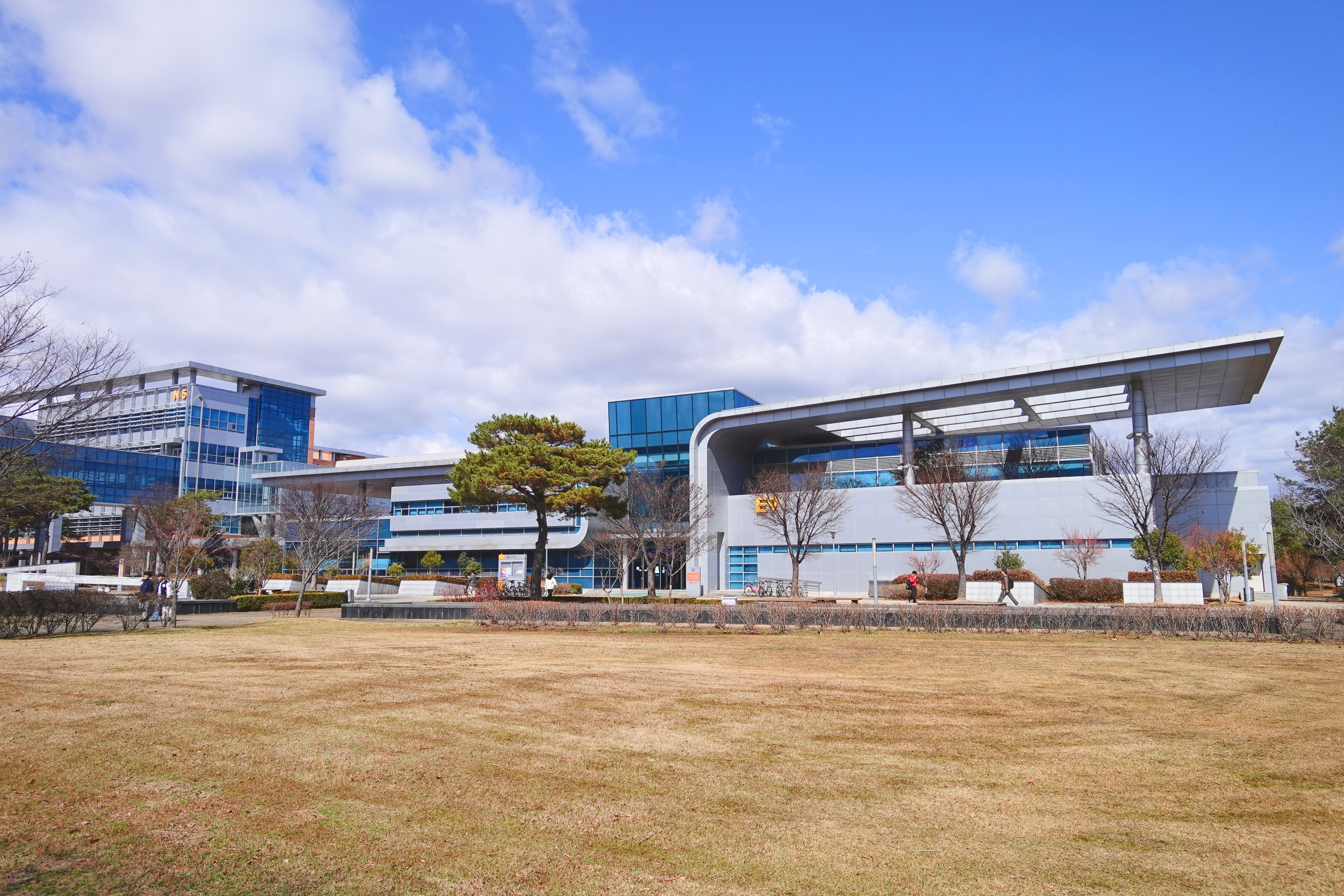
2nd Student Union for the undergraduate campus

During this period, GIST achieved international prominence for research impact. Between 2013 and 2018, the university consistently ranked in the top 10 globally for "Citations per Faculty" in the QS World University Rankings."QS World University Rankings: Gwangju Institute of Science and Technology". Quacquarelli Symonds.

=== AI specialization and Vision 2053 (2019–present) ===
In October 2019, GIST established its Artificial Intelligence (AI) Graduate School as part of a national strategy to lead in the Fourth Industrial Revolution. In July 2023, Dr. Kichul Lim was inaugurated as the 9th President of GIST.

To commemorate its 30th anniversary in November 2023, GIST held a vision declaration ceremony titled "GIST Vision 2053." The initiative set a goal for the institute to become a top 50 global university by 2053 by nurturing 30 world-class scholars and fostering 30 "unicorn-level" tech companies.Kim, S. (16 November 2023). "30 Years of Strength to 30 Years of Future: GIST Holds 30th Anniversary and Vision Declaration Ceremony". Electronic Times (ETNews) (in Korean). In January 2024, the university launched GIST Holdings to accelerate the commercialization of campus technologies and support regional economic development.Lee, J. (18 January 2024). "GIST establishes GIST Holdings to produce 30 unicorn companies". Maeil Business Newspaper (in Korean).

== Rankings ==
In the 2016/2017 QS World University Rankings® Result tables, GIST was ranked number 2 in the world in the category of citations per faculty. In the Times Higher Education World University Rankings 2014–2015, GIST was ranked 96th in the world in the category of Engineering & Technology.

University rankings
QS National	General	11
THE National	General	12–13
ARWU National	Research	24–29
QS Asia (Asia version)	General	105
THE Asia (Asia version)	General	68
USNWR Asia	General	144
ARWU World	Research	801–900
QS World	General	=385
THE World	General	401–500
USNWR World	General	=1125
THE World (Young)	General/Young	=85

=== Special Rankings ===
QS World Universities Ranking	#3 in the World number per citations per faculty
Times Higher Education World University Technology Rankings	#4 in South Korea
Patent application/registration number Ranking (HanKuk economy paper)	#2 in South Korea
Technology transfer income Ranking (HanKuk economy paper)	#1 in South Korea
Research fund per faculty Ranking (Korea Research Foundation)	#2 in South Korea
Thomson Reuters	#8 in South Korea

== Timeline ==
August 5, 1993	Gwangju Institute of Science and Technology Act promulgated
October 11, 1993	Dr. Doo-Bong Ha inaugurated as first president
February 27, 1997	First master's degrees conferred
Jan 22, 1998	Dr. Hyo-Gun Kim was appointed as the 2nd president
February 20, 2000	First doctorate degrees conferred
Feb. 16, 2002	Dr. Jung-Woong Ra, was appointed as the 3rd president
March 26, 2004	English acronym changed from KJIST to GIST, following Romanization change of the city name from Kwangju to Gwangju
Feb. 16, 2006	Dr. Sung-Gwan Huh was appointed as the 4th president
Jun. 04, 2008	Dr. Jung-Ho Sonu was appointed as the 5th president
Jun. 04, 2012	Dr. Young-Joon Kim was appointed as the 6th president
February 25, 2014	First bachelor's degrees conferred
March 11, 2015	Dr. Seung Hyeon Moon inaugurated as 7th president
March 6, 2019	Dr. Kiseon Kim inaugurated as 8th president
Oct. 11, 2019	Artificial Intelligence Graduate School is established
July 7, 2023	Dr. Kichul Lim inaugurated as 9th president

== Departments ==
=== GIST Undergraduate Programs ===
Freshman year: School of Humanities and Social Sciences – “Challenge & Exploration Program” (no major declared, liberal arts and sciences foundation year).

Sophomore–senior years: undergraduate departments (majors)

- College of Information & Computing
  - Department of Electrical Engineering and Computer Science – B.S. in Engineering
  - Department of AI Convergence – B.S. in Engineering
  - Department of Semiconductor Engineering – B.S. in Engineering (contract-based; undergraduate admission open to Korean nationals only)
- College of Natural Sciences
  - Department of Physics and Photon Science – B.S. in Science
  - Department of Chemistry – B.S. in Science
  - Department of Mathematical Sciences – B.S. in Science
- College of Engineering
  - Department of Materials Science and Engineering – B.S. in Engineering
  - Department of Mechanical and Robotics Engineering – B.S. in Engineering
  - Department of Environment and Energy Engineering – B.S. in Engineering
- College of Life Sciences & Medical Engineering
  - Department of Life Sciences – B.S. in Science
  - Department of Biomedical Science and Engineering – B.S. in Engineering (under preparation; not yet open for major declaration)

=== GIST Graduate Programs (master’s, doctoral, and integrated) ===
- College of Information & Computing – Department of Electrical Engineering and Computer Science; Department of AI Convergence; Department of Semiconductor Engineering (each offers M.S., Ph.D., and integrated M.S./Ph.D. in Engineering).
- College of Natural Sciences – Department of Physics and Photon Science; Department of Chemistry; Department of Mathematical Sciences (each offers M.S., Ph.D., and integrated M.S./Ph.D. in Science).
- College of Engineering – Department of Materials Science and Engineering; Department of Mechanical and Robotics Engineering; Department of Environment and Energy Engineering (each offers M.S., Ph.D., and integrated M.S./Ph.D. in Engineering).
- College of Life Sciences & Medical Engineering – Department of Life Sciences; Department of Biomedical Science and Engineering; Department of Integrative Neuroscience & Physiology (each offers M.S., Ph.D., and integrated M.S./Ph.D. in Science and/or Engineering, depending on the program).
- Institute of Integrated Technology – Graduate School of Management of Technology (M.S. in Management of Technology only; Ph.D. program under preparation, no integrated M.S./Ph.D. admission).

== See also ==
- List of national universities in South Korea
- List of universities and colleges in South Korea
- Education in Korea
