= List of Running Man episodes (2015) =

- No. of episodes: 52

Release
- Original network: SBS
- Original release: January 4 – December 27, 2015

Season chronology
- ← Previous; 2014 Next → 2016

This is a list of episodes of the South Korean variety show Running Man in 2015. The show airs on SBS as part of their Good Sunday lineup.

== Episodes ==
List of episodes (episode 228–279)
Ep.	Broadcast Date (Filming Date)	Guest(s)	Landmark	Teams		Mission	Results
228 (Note: New Year's Special.) (Note: Special appearance by Road FC fighter, Kim Ji-hoon as the monster on the first day (ep 228). Lee Seo-jin only appeared on the second day (ep 229).)	January 4, 2015 (December 8, 2014)	Lee Seung-gi Moon Chae-won Lee Seo-jin	SBS Broadcasting Center (Mok-dong, Yangcheon District, Seoul)	Blue Team (Yoo Jae-suk, Lee Kwang-soo, Lee Seung-gi); Brown Team (Gary, Haha, Moon Chae-won); Yellow Team (Jee Seok-jin, Kim Jong-kook, Song Ji-hyo)		Identify the safest place from extreme weather events	Everyone Wins
229	January 11, 2015 (December 9, 2014)	Lee Seung-gi Moon Chae-won Lee Seo-jin	Korea Manhwa Museum (Wonmi-gu, Bucheon, Gyeonggi Province)	Yoo Jae-suk & Lee Seo-jin; Gary & Song Ji-hyo; Haha & Jee Seok-jin; Kim Jong-kook & Lee Kwang-soo; Lee Seung-gi & Moon Chae-won		Clear the cards by pairing same-numbered cards	Yoo Jae-suk & Lee Seo-jin Wins; Yoo Jae-suk and Lee Seo-jin received a gold "R" ring each, with Yoo Jae-suk's gold ring given to Moon Chae-won.
230	January 18, 2015 (January 5, 2015)	Choi Tae-joon Hong Jong-hyun Nam Joo-hyuk Seo Ha-joon Seo Kang-joon (5urprise)	Suncheon International Wetlands Center (Suncheon, South Jeolla Province)	Senior Team (Yoo Jae-suk, Gary, Haha, Jee Seok-jin, Kim Jong-kook, Song Ji-hyo)	Junior Team (Lee Kwang-soo, Choi Tae-joon, Hong Jong-hyun, Nam Joo-hyuk, Seo Ha-joon, Seo Kang-joon)	Guess the most popular answer of the survey and score a beach ball that contains the answer	Junior Team Wins; Junior Team members received a gold ring each.
231	January 25, 2015 (January 6, 2015)	No guests	Muju Taekwondowon (Muju County, North Jeolla Province)	Mission Team (Gary, Haha, Jee Seok-jin, Kim Jong-kook, Song Ji-hyo)	Chasing Team (Yoo Jae-suk, Lee Kwang-soo)	Find your physical body by going through the belt colors of Taekwondo (Note: Yoo Jae-suk and Lee Kwang-soo must secretly eliminate the other members with a water gun.)	Yoo Jae-suk Wins
232 (Note: Park Ji-yoon had to leave the final mission halfway due to scheduling conflicts.)	February 1, 2015 (January 19, 2015)	Hong Kyung-min Kim Ji-soo Kim Won-jun Miryo (Brown Eyed Girls) Oh Hyun-kyung Park Ji-yoon Shin Da-eun	Gwacheon National Science Museum (Gwacheon-dong, Gwacheon, Gyeonggi Province)	Yoo Jae-suk & Kim Won-jun; Gary & Miryo; Haha & Park Ji-yoon; Jee Seok-jin & Oh Hyun-kyung; Kim Jong-kook & Hong Kyung-min; Lee Kwang-soo & Shin Da-eun; Song Ji-hyo & Kim Ji-soo		Find the real golden key	Jee Seok-jin & Oh Hyun-kyung Wins; Jee Seok-jin & Oh Hyun-kyung received the golden key.
233 (Note: Kim Jong-kook did not appear in the final mission due to difficulties coping his lower back disc injury after the 2nd mission (1 vs 3 nametag ripping), but was present at the show's closing.)	February 8, 2015 (January 20, 2015)	Dongwoo (Infinite) Dongwoon (Beast) Eric Nam Minhyuk (BtoB) N (VIXX) Niel (Teen Top) Ryeowook (Super Junior) Sohyun (4Minute) Sojin (Girl's Day)	SBS Open Hall (Deungchon-dong, Gangseo District, Seoul)	Red Team (Yoo Jae-suk, Dongwoo, Dongwoon, Sohyun); Pink Team (Gary, Haha, N, Sojin); Blue Team (Jee Seok-jin, Lee Kwang-soo, Eric Nam, Niel); White Team (Kim Jong-kook, Song Ji-hyo, Minhyuk, Ryeowook)		Find the gold bars	Pink Team Wins; Pink Team received 10 gold bars.
234 (Note: Seollal Special.) (Note: Filming took place in Hong Kong, Thailand and Jeju Island for the first day only. Special appearance by Song Kyung-ah in ep 234 via video and Nam Sung-ryeol, Park Seong-hoon, Shin Hyo-seop, Heo Hyuk-goo as judges.)	February 15, 2015 (February 2, 2015)	Fei (Miss A) Kim Sung-ryung Seo Woo Shoo Taecyeon (2PM) Yeon Jung-hoon Yoo Sun	MTP Mall (Simgok-ro, Seo District, Incheon)	Yoo Jae-suk & Yeon Jung-hoon; Gary & Kim Sung-ryung; Haha & Shoo; Jee Seok-jin & Yoo Sun; Kim Jong-kook & Seo Woo; Lee Kwang-soo & Fei; Song Ji-hyo & Taecyeon		Cook the best dish of 2015	Kim Jong-kook & Seo Woo Wins; Kim Jong-kook & Seo Woo received 2 golden kitchen knives.
235	February 22, 2015 (February 3, 2015)	Fei (Miss A) Kim Sung-ryung Seo Woo Shoo Taecyeon (2PM) Yeon Jung-hoon Yoo Sun	MTP Mall (Simgok-ro, Seo District, Incheon)	Yoo Jae-suk & Yeon Jung-hoon; Gary & Kim Sung-ryung; Haha & Shoo; Jee Seok-jin & Yoo Sun; Kim Jong-kook & Seo Woo; Lee Kwang-soo & Fei; Song Ji-hyo & Taecyeon		Cook the best dish of 2015	Kim Jong-kook & Seo Woo Wins; Kim Jong-kook & Seo Woo received 2 golden kitchen knives.
236 (Note: Song Ji-hyo acted as a host and did not participate in the race.)	March 1, 2015 (February 17, 2015)	Andy Dong-wan Eric Hye-sung Jun Jin Min-woo (Shinhwa) Jung Hee-chul Hyung-sik Moon Joon-young Kim Dong-jun Kwang-hee Tae-heon (ZE:A)	Hangang Park (Han River, Yeouido-dong, Yeongdeungpo District, Seoul)	Running Man Team (Yoo Jae-suk, Gary, Haha, Jee Seok-jin, Kim Jong-kook, Lee Kwang-soo); Shinhwa Team (Andy, Dong-wan, Eric, Hye-sung, Jun Jin, Min-woo); ZE:A Team (Hee-chul, Hyung-sik, Jun-young, Kim Dong-jun, Kwang-hee, Tae-heon)		Get the highest overall score	Running Man Team Wins; Running Man Team received golden "R" badges.
237	March 8, 2015 (February 16, 2015)	Hani (EXID) Jung So-min Nam Ji-hyun Yerin (GFriend) Yoon So-hee	TBD	Yoo Jae-suk & Hani; Gary & Jung So-min; Haha & Song Ji-hyo; Jee Seok-jin & Yerin; Kim Jong-kook & Nam Ji-hyun; Lee Kwang-soo & Yoon So-hee		Guess the object with lowest density	Haha & Song Ji-hyo Wins; Haha & Song Ji-hyo received a pair of golden "R" rings.
238	March 15, 2015 (March 2, 2015)	Kim Seo-hyung Ye Ji-won	The ARC River Culture Pavilion (Dasa-eup, Dalseong County, Daegu)	Blue Team (Yoo Jae-suk, Lee Kwang-soo, Ye Ji-won); Black Team (Gary, Jee Seok-jin, Song Ji-hyo); Grey Team (Kim Jong-kook, Haha, Kim Seo-hyung)		Purify the contaminated water	Grey Team Wins; Grey Team received a gold "R" ring each.
239	March 22, 2015 (March 10, 2015)	Kim Dong-hyun Sung Si-kyung	SBS Prism Tower (Sangam-dong, Mapo District, Seoul)	No teams		Find the Golden Coins	Kim Dong-hyun Wins; Kim Dong-hyun received ₩1.3 million.
240 (Note: Special appearances by Martial Arts Athletes (Lee Sang-soo, Cha In-ho, Jun Young-joon, Yang Seung-ho, Kim Chang-hyun) as Hunters at the final mission.)	March 29, 2015 (March 17, 2015)	Junho (2PM) Kang Ha-neul Kim Woo-bin	Seodaemun Museum of Natural History (Seodaemun District, Seoul)	Oh, Shiny 20's Quiz: Without Seok-jin Team (Gary, Haha, Lee Kwang-soo, Song Ji-hyo, Kim Woo-bin); With Seok-jin Team (Jee Seok-jin, Yoo Jae-suk, Kim Jong-kook, Junho, Kang Ha-neul); Youth Karaoke Room: Jee Seok-jin & Song Ji-hyo; Yoo Jae-suk & Gary; Haha & Kim Jong-kook; Lee Kwang-soo & Junho; Kang Ha-neul & Kim Woo-bin	Frightening Name Tag Elimination: Running Man Team (Jee Seok-jin, Yoo Jae-suk, Gary, Haha, Kim Jong-kook, Lee Kwang-soo, Song Ji-hyo, Junho, Kim Woo-bin, Kang Ha-neul); Scary Men Team (Lee Sang-soo, Cha In-ho, Jun Young-joon, Yang Seung-ho, Kim Chang-hyun)	Help Jee Seok-jin reach 100 points	Everyone Wins; Jee Seok-jin chose not to share the 10 gold rings with the other members.
241	April 5, 2015 (March 16, 2015)	Park Ye-jin Shin Se-kyung Yoon Jin-seo	Suwon Baseball Stadium (Jangan District, Suwon, Gyeonggi Province)	Yoo Jae-suk & Jee Seok-jin; Gary & Shin Se-kyung; Haha & Song Ji-hyo; Kim Jong-kook & Yoon Jin-seo; Lee Kwang-soo & Park Ye-jin	Mission Team (Yoo Jae-suk, Gary, Haha, Jee Seok-jin, Kim Jong-kook, Lee Kwang-soo); Culprit Team (Song Ji-hyo, Park Ye-jin, Shin Se-kyung, Yoon Jin-seo)	Catch the culprits who stole the meteorite	Culprit Team Wins; Culprit Team received an undisclosed cash prize.
242	April 12, 2015 (March 30, 2015)	Jung Il-woo Jung Yong-hwa (CNBLUE) Lee Hong-gi (F.T. Island)	SBS Tanhyeon-dong Production Center (Ilsanseo District, Goyang, Gyeonggi Province)	Team of 7/Mission Team (Yoo Jae-suk, Gary, Haha, Jee Seok-jin, Song Ji-hyo, Jung Yong-hwa, Lee Hong-gi)	Team of 3/Chasing Team (Kim Jong-kook, Lee Kwang-soo, Jung Il-woo)	Defeat the other team	Team of 3/Chasing Team Wins
243 (Note: The ones who got eliminated from both teams while moving to the next mission became the "extras" and they're considered not counted for the team's final victory despite their contributions.) (Note: Special appearance by Choi Woo-shik, Ma Dong-seok, Jung Yu-mi and Gong Yoo.)	April 19, 2015 (April 6, 2015)	Hong Jong-hyun Jang Su-won Kang Kyun-sung Son Ho-jun Yoo Byung-jae	TBD	Hot Guys Team (Yoo Jae-suk, Jee Seok-jin, Lee Kwang-soo, Kang Kyun-sung, Son Ho-jun, Yoo Byung-jae)	Cool Guys Team (Gary, Haha, Kim Jong-kook, Song Ji-hyo, Hong Jong-hyun, Jang Su-won)	Eliminate the other team while moving to the next mission landmark	Haha, Song Ji-hyo, Hong Jong-hyun, Jang Su-won Wins; Haha, Song Ji-hyo, Hong Jong-hyun, and Jang Su-won received a gift certificate for a department store.
244 (Note: Kim Jong-kook & Jang Do-yeon received an advantage to see the other couple cards and change them.)	April 26, 2015 (April 13, 2015)	Choa (AOA) Jang Do-yeon Jessi (Lucky J) Kim Yoo-ri Seo Ye-ji	M Palace Wedding Hall (Mapo District, Seoul)	Yoo Jae-suk & Jessi; Gary & Seo Ye-ji; Haha & Choa; Jee Seok-jin & Kim Yoo-ri; Lee Kwang-soo & Song Ji-hyo	Dangerous Couple (Kim Jong-kook & Jang Do-yeon)	Avoid the wedding hall of the "dangerous couple"	Lee Kwang-soo & Song Ji-hyo Wins; Lee Kwang-soo & Song Ji-hyo received ₩1 million.
245	May 3, 2015 (April 27, 2015)	Jinu Sean (Jinusean)	Everland (Yongin, Gyeonggi Province)	Blue Team (Yoo Jae-suk, Lee Kwang-soo, Jee Seok-jin); Pink Team (Gary, Haha, Song Ji-hyo); Green Team (Kim Jong-kook, Jinu, Sean)		Defuse the time bomb by cutting the colored wires in order	Blue Team Wins ₩4 million worth of toys were donated under the name of Sean and Jee Seok-jin.
246 (Note: Special appearance by Seo Woo.)	May 10, 2015 (April 14, 2015)	Park Seo-joon Son Hyun-joo	Lotte Department Store Incheon (formerly Shinsegae Department Store)	Normal Detectives (Gary, Haha, Jee Seok-jin, Kim Jong-kook, Lee Kwang-soo, Park Seo-joon, Son Hyun-joo)	Quick-witted Detectives (Yoo Jae-suk, Song Ji-hyo)	Rescue the actress (Note: The "quick-witted detectives" did not know their missions until they met at the final mission.)	Quick-witted Detectives Wins
247	May 17, 2015 (April 28, 2015)	No guests	Hanhwa Aqua Planet Ilsan (Ilsanseo District, Goyang, Gyeonggi Province)	Mission Team (Yoo Jae-suk, Gary, Haha, Jee Seok-jin, Kim Jong-kook, Song Ji-hyo)	Chasing Team (Lee Kwang-soo)	Fool Lee Kwang-soo until the end of recording	Mission Team Wins; Mission Team members received ₩1 million each and Jee Seok-jin received double the amount for being the final survivor from the Mission Team. (Note: Lee Kwang-soo did not realize that it was a hidden camera until the day of broadcast when he was interviewed live after the broadcast.)
248	May 24, 2015 (May 5, 2015)	Amber (f(x)) Henry (Super Junior-M) Kangnam (M.I.B) Nichkhun (2PM) Park Joon-hyung (g.o.d)	Han River (Mapo District, Seoul)	Yoo Jae-suk & Henry; Gary & Nichkhun; Haha & Amber; Jee Seok-jin & Park Joon-hyung; Kim Jong-kook & Kangnam; Lee Kwang-soo & Song Ji-hyo		Avoid the cordless bungee jumping punishment in Inje	Yoo Jae-suk & Henry, Gary & Nichkhun, Haha & Amber, Kim Jong-kook & Kangnam, Lee Kwang-soo & Song Ji-hyo Wins; Jee Seok-jin & Park Joon-hyung did the cordless bungee jumping punishment.
249	May 31, 2015 (May 12, 2015)	Kim Jun-hyun Uee (After School)	TBD	Learn What The Blacklist is About: Yoo Jae-suk & Kim Jun-hyun; Gary & Jee Seok-jin; Kim Jong-kook & Song Ji-hyo; Lee Kwang-soo & Uee; Haha	Blacklist Race: No teams	Collect all 5 ingredients for jjajangmyun	No Winners; The prize is said to be added to the next episode.
250	June 7, 2015 (May 25, 2015)	Dae-sung G-Dragon Seung-ri Tae-yang T.O.P (Big Bang)	Inje Speedium Racing Circuit (Inje County, Gangwon Province)	Big Merchants From The Joseon Era (Yoo Jae-suk, Gary, Haha, Jee Seok-jin, Lee Kwang-soo, Song Ji-hyo)	Gladiators From The Roman Era (Kim Jong-kook, Dae-sung, G-Dragon, Seung-ri, Tae-yang, T.O.P)	Go back to the past by winning the "Time Track" Race	Gladiators From The Roman Era Wins
251 (Note: Special appearance by Song Joong-ki, Zo In-sung, and Lim Ju-hwan.)	June 14, 2015 (June 1, 2015)	Byul Kim So-hyun Son Jun-ho	I'Park Bundang (Bundang District, Seongnam, Gyeonggi Province)	Yoo Jae-suk & Kim Jong-kook; Gary & Song Ji-hyo; Haha & Byul; Jee Seok-jin & Lee Kwang-soo; Kim So-hyun & Son Jun-ho		The Love and War Race - Meet each other on the same floor (Note: Only Haha & Byul were qualified for the mission because they had the fewest rings left.)	Haha & Byul Wins; Haha & Byul received a pair of star-shaped golden rings.
252	June 21, 2015 (June 15, 2015)	Eun Ji-won Jay Park Jessi (Lucky J) San E Verbal Jint	TBD	Athletics Club (Kim Jong-kook, Gary, Haha, Jee Seok-jin, Lee Kwang-soo, Song Ji-hyo)	Hip Hop Club (Yoo Jae-suk, Eun Ji-won, Jay Park, Jessi, San E, Verbal Jint)	Form a greater number each round with a number & an operation card to win the "Card Battle"	Athletics Club Wins; Athletics Club received 1 golden snapback each.
253	June 28, 2015 (June 16, 2015)	Do Sang-woo Hae-ryung (Bestie) Hwang Seung-eon Irene Kim Park Ha-na Seo Hyun-jin Jang Ye-eun (CLC)	One Mount Water Park (Ilsanseo District, Goyang, Gyeonggi Province)	Yoo Jae-suk & Park Ha-na; Gary & Hwang Seung-eon; Haha & Ye-eun; Jee Seok-jin & Hae-ryung; Kim Jong-kook & Irene Kim; Lee Kwang-soo & Seo Hyun-jin; Song Ji-hyo & Do Sang-woo		Extract the key from ice block and unlock 1 of the boxes by matching the key to the lock	Lee Kwang-soo & Seo Hyun-jin Wins; Lee Kwang-soo & Seo Hyun-jin received a basket of fruits as prize.
254 (Note: Special appearance by Choi Hong-man and Choi Min-ho (Shinee) as gatekeepers for the final mission.)	July 5, 2015 (June 23, 2015)	Hyo-yeon Seo-hyun Soo-young Sunny Tae-yeon Tiffany Yoona Yuri (Girls' Generation)	Times Square (Yeongdeungpo District, Seoul)	Green Team (Yoo Jae-suk, Lee Kwang-soo, Hyo-yeon); Yellow Team (Gary, Soo-young, Yoona); Orange Team (Haha, Tiffany, Yuri); Blue Team (Jee Seok-jin, Song Ji-hyo, Sunny); Pink Team (Kim Jong-kook, Seo-hyun, Tae-yeon)	Angel Code (Yoona)	Find the 4 barcodes to escape and prevent the "Angel Code" from winning while avoiding the "gatekeepers" (Note: "Gatekeepers" ignore the "Angel Code".)	Yoona Wins
255 (Note: Summer Special.)	July 12, 2015 (July 6, 2015)	Bo-ra (Sistar) So-you (Sistar) Lee Guk-joo Seolhyun (AOA) Yoon Bo-mi (Apink)	BlueOne Water Park (Bodeok-dong, Gyeongju, North Gyeongsang Province)	Korea's Top Three Healthy Food: Yoo Jae-suk & So-you; Gary & Seolhyun; Haha & Bo-ra; Jee Seok-jin & Song Ji-hyo; Kim Jong-kook & Yoon Bo-mi; Lee Kwang-soo & Lee Guk-joo; Rice Bowl Fight: Queen So-you Team (Yoo Jae-suk, Kim Jong-kook, So-you, Yoon Bo-mi); Queen Seolhyun Team (Gary, Jee Seok-jin, Song Ji-hyo, Seolhyun); Queen Bo-ra Team (Haha, Lee Kwang-soo, Bo-ra, Lee Guk-joo)	Capture The Flag: Queen So-you Team (Yoo Jae-suk, Gary, Kim Jong-kook, Song Ji-hyo, So-you, Yoon Bo-mi); Queen Bo-ra Team (Haha, Jee Seok-jin, Lee Kwang-soo, Bo-ra, Lee Guk-joo, Seolhyun)	Queen of Early Summer Race - Conquer the game stations with the most team flags within 30mins	Queen Bo-ra Team Wins; Queen Bo-ra Team received 30 golden eggs. So-you and Yoon Bo-mi each received 1 golden egg from Bo-ra.
256 (Note: Special appearance by Ryu Soo-jung (Jee Seok-jin's wife) and Ji Hyun-woo (Jee Seok-jin's son).)	July 19, 2015 (July 1, 2015)	Baek Jin-hee Chansung Jun. K Junho Nichkhun Taecyeon Wooyoung (2PM)	Jee Seok-jin's House (Note: As filming took place in Jee Seok-jin's home, the address and location was kept confidential.)	Jin-hee Team (Yoo Jae-suk, Gary, Haha, Jee Seok-jin, Kim Jong-kook, Lee Kwang-soo, Baek Jin-hee)	Ji-hyo Team (Song Ji-hyo, Chansung, Jun. K, Junho, Nichkhun, Taecyeon, Wooyoung)	Locate the Running Man fan's house and be the first one to give him a hug	Ji-hyo Team Wins
257 (Note: Special appearance by professional Go player Cho Hoon-hyun, profiler Pyo Chang-won, Korean folk singer Song So-hee, webtoonist Cho Suk, Professor Bae Myung-jin and chef Michael.)	July 26, 2015 (July 14, 2015)	Hong Jin-ho Hyun Joo-yup Kim Yeon-koung Shin Soo-ji Song Chong-gug	SBS Tanhyeon-dong Production Center (Ilsanseo District, Goyang, Gyeonggi Province)	Yoo Jae-suk & Kim Yeon-koung; Gary & Jee Seok-jin; Haha & Hyun Joo-yup; Kim Jong-kook & Shin Soo-ji; Lee Kwang-soo & Hong Jin-ho; Song Ji-hyo & Song Chong-gug		Defeat the other teams	Yoo Jae-suk & Kim Yeon-koung Wins; Yoo Jae-suk & Kim Yeon-koung each received an "ultimate book of secrets" with golden labels.
258 (Note: Special appearance by actor Lee Dong-joon (actor) as the "Mafia Boss" for the final mission.)	August 2, 2015 (July 20, 2015)	Hwang Jung-min Jang Yoon-ju Jung Man-sik	TBD	Police Team (Yoo Jae-suk, Jee Seok-jin, Lee Kwang-soo, Song Ji-hyo, Hwang Jung-min)	Mafia Team (Kim Jong-kook, Gary, Haha, Jang Yoon-ju, Jung Man-sik)	Find Your Identity Race - Capture the Mafia Team members and stop them from finding and delivering 5 briefcases with gold bars to the "Mafia Boss"	Mafia Team Wins (Note: Jee Seok-jin did the Mafia Team's final mission because he failed to correctly guess his identity as a Police Team member due to limited hints obtained.)
259 (Note: Special appearance by announcer Kim Hwan.)	August 9, 2015 (July 27, 2015)	Cha Ye-ryun Lee Yo-won	SBS Prism Tower (Sangam-dong, Mapo District, Seoul)	Yo-won Team (Yoo Jae-suk, Haha, Lee Yo-won); Ye-ryun Team (Gary, Kim Jong-kook, Cha Ye-ryun); Ji-hyo Team (Jee Seok-jin, Lee Kwang-soo, Song Ji-hyo)		Complete the acting missions stated in the script	Yo-won Team Wins; Yo-won Team each received an actor's chair with golden-stitched name tag and a golden "R" badge.
260 (Note: 5th Anniversary Special.) (Note: Special appearance by Kim Chang-ryeol (DJ Doc) and Kim Sung-soo (singer) (Cool).)	August 16, 2015 (August 4, 2015)	Kim Gun-mo Koo Jun-yup Lee Ha-neul (DJ Doc) Lee Jae-hoon (Cool) Park Joon-hyung (g.o.d)	Some Sevit (Banpo-dong, Seocho District, Seoul)	Red Team (Yoo Jae-suk, Gary, Song Ji-hyo, Koo Jun-yup, Lee Jae-hoon, Park Joon-hyung)	Blue Team (Haha, Jee Seok-jin, Kim Jong-kook, Lee Kwang-soo, Kim Gun-mo, Lee Ha-neul)	Get the highest number of "album sales"	Blue Team Wins; Blue Team members each received a Golden Disc.
261	August 23, 2015 (August 4, 2015)	Kim Gun-mo Koo Jun-yup Lee Ha-neul (DJ Doc) Lee Jae-hoon (Cool) Park Joon-hyung (g.o.d)	Some Sevit (Banpo-dong, Seocho District, Seoul)	Red Team (Yoo Jae-suk, Gary, Song Ji-hyo, Koo Jun-yup, Lee Jae-hoon, Park Joon-hyung)	Blue Team (Haha, Jee Seok-jin, Kim Jong-kook, Lee Kwang-soo, Kim Gun-mo, Lee Ha-neul)	Get the highest number of "album sales"	Blue Team Wins; Blue Team members each received a Golden Disc.
261	August 23, 2015 (August 4, 2015)	No guests	Chuncheon Girl's High School (Chuncheon, Gangwon Province)	No teams		Search for your own and your personal VJs' name tags (Note: The members & VJs can choose to escape first if their own name tag was found.)	Everyone Wins; Yoo Jae-suk, Haha, Gary and Song Ji-hyo succeeded with their VJs. Kim Jong-kook and Lee Kwang-soo succeeded, but their VJs escaped first and Jee Seok-jin succeeded by escaping first and left his VJ.
262	August 30, 2015 (August 3, 2015)	Kang Sung-jin Kim Min-kyo Kim Soo-ro Nam Bo-ra Park Gun-hyung	Sejong Garden (Hannam-dong, Yongsan District, Seoul)	Eyes, Nose & Mouth Team (Yoo Jae-suk, Jee Seok-jin, Kim Min-kyo); Young Bloods Team (Gary, Haha, Nam Bo-ra); Strongest Team (Kim Jong-kook, Lee Kwang-soo, Kim Soo-ro); Old Friends Team (Song Ji-hyo, Kang Sung-jin, Park Gun-hyung)		Avoid coming in last place in order not to pay for the staffs' meal	Eyes, Nose & Mouth Team, Young Bloods Team, Old Friends Team Wins; Kim Jong-kook paid for the meal. (Kang Su-jin left the venue before the decision was made.)
263 (Note: Special participation in the final mission by students recruited from Ewha Womans University, Sungshin Women's University, Hongik University, Kyung Hee University, Korea University & Yonsei University.)	September 6, 2015 (August 17, 2015)	Lee Dong-wook Park Seo-joon Yura (Girl's Day)	Yeouido Park (Yeouido-dong, Yeongdeungpo District, Seoul)	Liberal Arts Department Team (Yoo Jae-suk, Gary, Jee Seok-jin, Song Ji-hyo, Lee Dong-wook)	Science Department Team (Haha, Kim Jong-kook, Lee Kwang-soo, Park Seo-joon, Yura)	Defeat the other team in a tug-of-war (Note: The original final mission was to turn the metal bar around a turntable once, but it was damaged during their first attempt.)	Science Department Team Wins; An undisclosed amount of grant money was awarded to the students who participated in the final mission together with Science Department Team.
264 (Note: Special appearance by Son Tae-young.)	September 13, 2015 (August 31, 2015)	Kwon Sang-woo Sung Dong-il	National Science Museum (Guseong-dong, Yuseong District, Daejeon)	Jae-suk Team (Yoo Jae-suk, Haha, Lee Kwang-soo); Sang-woo Team (Kwon Sang Woo, Gary, Jee Seok-jin, Song Ji-hyo); Dong-il Team (Sung Dong-il, Kim Jong-kook)		Find Client X (Son Tae-young)	Jae-suk Team Wins; Jae-suk Team each received a golden magnifying glasses.
265	September 20, 2015 (September 1, 2015)	John Park Kyuhyun (Super Junior) RM (BTS) Yeeun (Wonder Girls)	Yeongheungdo, Incheon	Mission Team (Yoo Jae-suk, Haha, Jee Seok-jin, Kim Jong-kook, Lee Kwang-soo, Song Ji-hyo, John Park, Kyuhyun, RM, Ye-eun)	Chasing Team (Gary)	Mission Team: Gary must remain stranded on the island alone. Chasing Team: Successfully escape the island or realize that this is a Hidden Camera.	Mission Team Wins; Gary was brought to the other side of the island where he was told it was a Hidden Camera.
266 (Note: Chuseok Special.)	September 27, 2015 (September 8, 2015)	Eun-hyuk (Super Junior) Hong Jin-young Lim Ju-hwan	Gangneung Stadium (Gyo-dong, Gangneung, Gangwon Province)	Top 5 Rest Stop's Best Menu: Yoo Jae-suk, Lee Kwang-soo, Lim Ju-hwan; Gary & Song Ji-hyo; Haha & Jee Seok-jin; Kim Jong-kook, Eunhyuk, Hong Jin-young; Thanksgiving Game Battle: Jae-suk Team (Yoo Jae-suk, Jee Seok-jin, Lee Kwang-soo, Song Ji-hyo, Lim Ju-hwan); Jong-kook Team (Kim Jong-kook, Gary, Haha, Eun-hyuk, Hong Jin-young)	The Thieves vs The Chasers: Mission Team (Yoo Jae-suk, Lee Kwang-soo, Lim Ju-hwan); Chasing Team (Gary, Haha, Jee Seok-jin, Kim Jong-kook, Song Ji-hyo, Eun-hyuk, Hong Jin-young)	Capture the "thieves" and stop them from shipping the Thanksgiving gifts back to Seoul	Chasing Team Wins; Chasing Team shared the gift sets except Jee Seok-jin who was eliminated for trying to steal too.
267 (Note: Special appearance by massage therapist Kim Hyung-joon.)	October 4, 2015 (September 22, 2015)	No guests	Space Avanshow Studio (Tanhyeon-myeon, Paju, Gyeonggi Province)	No teams		Complete 3 missions unanimously to escape from 24 hours confinement	Everyone Wins
268	October 11, 2015 (September 21, 2015)	Gong Seung-yeon Hwang Suk-jung Joy (Red Velvet) Jung Kyung-ho Kim Ja-in Park Han-byul Park Na-rae Stephanie (The Grace) Yoon Park	Gwanggyo Youth Center (Yeongtong District, Suwon, Gyeonggi Province)	Let's Pick Up The Stars: Yoo Jae-suk & Park Han-byul; Gary & Gong Seung-yeon; Haha & Kim Ja-in; Jee Seok-jin & Park Na-rae; Kim Jong-kook & Stephanie; Lee Kwang-soo & Joy; Song Ji-hyo & Yoon Park; The Kimbap of Fortune & Allied Basketball Game: (Note: The basketball game was edited out of the broadcast, and since the captions didn't mention about team change for the basketball game, the same team formation before was assumed to have been used.); Yoo Jae-suk & Gong Seung-yeon; Gary & Kim Ja-in; Haha & Joy; Jee Seok-jin & Park Na-rae; Kim Jong-kook & Park Han-byul; Lee Kwang-soo & Stephanie; Song Ji-hyo & Yoon Park	Bells Hide-and-Seek: Mission Team (Yoo Jae-suk & Park Han-byul, Gary & Kim Ja-in, Haha & Gong Seung-yeon, Jee Seok-jin & Park Na-rae, Kim Jong-kook & Stephanie, Lee Kwang-soo & Song Ji-hyo, Joy & Yoon Park); Chasing Team (Jung Kyung-ho & Hwang Suk-jung)	Stand on the platform with the retrieved couple rings without getting eliminated.	Haha & Gong Seung-yeon Wins; Haha & Gong Seung-yeon received a pair of diamond rings.
269	October 18, 2015 (October 6, 2015)	Kim Hee-won Lee Chun-hee Park Bo-young	National Folk Museum of Korea (Samcheong-dong, Jongno District, Seoul)	Ji-hyo Team (Yoo Jae-suk, Gary, Song Ji-hyo, Kim Hee-won, Lee Chun-hee)	Bo-young Team (Haha, Jee Seok-jin, Kim Jong-kook, Lee Kwang-soo, Park Bo-young)	Defeat the other team	Ji-hyo Team Wins; Ji-hyo Team each received a gold bar.
270	October 25, 2015 (October 5, 2015)	No guests	KINTEX (Ilsanseo District, Goyang, Gyeonggi Province)	Mission Team (Lee Kwang-soo)	Chasing Team (Yoo Jae-suk, Gary, Haha, Jee Seok-jin, Kim Jong-kook, Song Ji-hyo)	Mission Team: Trap all of the other cast members in the final room. (Note: This episode focused on Lee Kwang-soo's attempt to get his revenge for the hidden camera in ep 247. The other cast members were unaware of this until the final moments.); Chasing Team: Prevent Lee Kwang-soo from getting his revenge.	Chasing Team Wins; Lee Kwang-soo was forced to complete the crawling maze and was slapped on the forehead by Yoo Jae-suk as punishment.
271	November 1, 2015 (October 19, 2015)	Jung Doo-hong Kim Ki-tae Lee Won-hee Noh Ji-sim Taemi Jae-suk's guests Appeared in both episodes: Kim Kwang-kyu; Im Hyung-joon; Yang Sang-guk; Only appeared in episode 272: Kim Sook; Kwang-hee (ZE:A); Park Na-rae; Sa Sung-woong; Gary's guests Appeared in both episodes: Chang Jung-koo; Choi Kyung-ho; DJ Pumkin (AOMG); Hwang Choong-jae; Youngjun (Brown Eyed Soul); Only appeared in episode 272: Digili (Honey Family); Ducky; Ryu Hyun-kyung; Wax; Haha's guests Appeared in both episodes: DJ R2; Hyun Joo-yup; Juvie Train (Buga Kingz); King Kong; Lee Jung; Linda; Recto Luz; Zion Luz (Rapercussion); M. TySON; Ma Ah-sung; Mino (singer) (Freestyle (Korean group)); Nuol; Oh Jung-suk; Park Geun-sik; Sam Hammington; San (singer); Shim Hyung-tak; Superbee; Wang-bae; Yui-yeop; Only appeared in episode 272: Jinu (Jinusean); Kim Chang-keun; Lee Ha-neul (DJ Doc); Lee Sung-mi; Zizo; Seok-jin's guests Appeared in both episodes: Chi In-jin; Go Woo-ri (Rainbow); Heo Tae-hee; Kim Soo-young; Kim Won-hyo; Yoon Park; Only appeared in episode 272: Byun Seung-yoon; Cha Hun; Kim Jae-hyun; Kwon Kwang-jin; Lee Seung-hyub (N.Flying); Kim Min-kyo; Moon Ji-ae; Muzie; Roy Kim; Jong-kook's guests Appeared in both episodes: Jung Tae-ho (comedian); Kim Jun-hyun; Lee Sang-ho (comedian); Lee Sang-min (comedian); Only appeared in episode 272: BamBam; Jackson; JB; Jinyoung; Mark; Youngjae; Yugyeom (Got7); Hwang Chi-yeul; Hyun Woo; Park Joon-hyung (g.o.d); Tim; Kwang-soo's guests Appeared in both episodes: Kim Ki-bang; Lim Ju-hwan; Uee (After School); Only appeared in episode 272: Cho Yoon-woo; Dino; DK; Hoshi; Yoon Jeonghan; Joshua; Jun; Mingyu; S.Coups; Seungkwan; The8; Vernon; Wonwoo; Woozi; Jung Dong-hyun; Kim Ji-an; Ji-hyo's guests Appeared in both episodes: Seulong (2AM); (Note: All members were asked to invite 93 more guests by themselves to reach 100 members for the Running Man Team. Mini games were played in between when the number of Running Man Team members reaches 20, 40, & 60, to provide them chances to reduce the number of Heroes Team members for the final 100 vs 100 name tag elimination game.)	Korea University Gymnasium (Anam-dong, Seongbuk District, Seoul)	Running Man Team (Yoo Jae-suk, Gary, Haha, Jee Seok-jin, Kim Jong-kook, Lee Kwang-soo, Song Ji-hyo & all invited guests)	Heroes Team (Jung Doo-hong, Kim Ki-tae, Lee Won-hee, Noh Ji-sim, Taemi & the remaining athletes)	Defeat the Heroes Team in the 100 vs 100 name tag elimination	Heroes Team Wins
272 (Note: Special appearance by GFriend.) (Note: Uee (After School), Seulong (2AM), Chi In-jin, Park Na-rae, Kim Jun-hyun, Shim Hyung-tak and Lim Ju-hwan left the filming site early before the final name tag elimination game began.)	November 8, 2015 (October 19, 2015)		Korea University Gymnasium (Anam-dong, Seongbuk District, Seoul)	Running Man Team (Yoo Jae-suk, Gary, Haha, Jee Seok-jin, Kim Jong-kook, Lee Kwang-soo, Song Ji-hyo & all invited guests)	Heroes Team (Jung Doo-hong, Kim Ki-tae, Lee Won-hee, Noh Ji-sim, Taemi & the remaining athletes)	Defeat the Heroes Team in the 100 vs 100 name tag elimination	Heroes Team Wins
273	November 15, 2015 (October 20, 2015 & October 26, 2015)	Jung Chan-woo Kim Tae-gyun (Cultwo) Hong Yoon-hwa Kim Jeong-hwan (comedian) Kim Tae-hwan Lee Eun-hyung (People Looking for a Laugh)	"K" Theater (Hyehwa-dong, Jongno District, Seoul)	Running Man Team (Gary, Haha, Kim Jong-kook, Song Ji-hyo & 2 groups of PLL crew) (Note: Running Man Team won several times in a mini-game of Ddakji and picked 2 groups from PLL crew.)	PLL Team (All remaining groups in the PLL crew)	Gain the highest number of votes for the funniest live comedy group (Note: Yoo Jae-suk, Jee Seok-jin and Lee Kwang-soo were not chosen for the final mission, thus they became a part of the audience and watched.)	Running Man Team Wins; Running Man Team gave away the prize to the PLL crew.
274	November 22, 2015 (November 9, 2015)	Jo Jung-chi (Shinchireem) Kim Kwang-kyu Min Kyung-hoon (Buzz) Niel (Teen Top) Park Soo-hong	Sanjung Lake RV Resort (Gyeonggi Province)	Yoo Jae-suk & Kim Kwang-kyu; Gary & Haha; Jee Seok-jin & Jo Jung-chi; Kim Jong-kook & Park Soo-hong; Lee Kwang-soo & Niel; Song Ji-hyo & Min Kyung-hoon		Complete the final mission, retrieve keys to unlock the chain and escape the camp site	Yoo Jae-suk & Kim Kwang-kyu, Gary & Haha, Kim Jong-kook & Park Soo-hong, Lee Kwang-soo & Niel, Song Ji-hyo & Min Kyung-hoon Wins; Jee Seok-jin & Jo Jung-chi were to clean up the caravans as punishment.
275 (Note: Special appearance by Yoona (Girls' Generation) through the phone and Jeon Yong-jun & Lee Byung-jin as casters for the Rival Big Match.)	November 29, 2015 (November 16, 2015)	Hani (EXID) Hong Jin-ho Kim Hee-chul Leeteuk (Super Junior) Lim Yo-hwan	SBS Open Hall (Deungchon-dong, Gangseo District, Seoul)	Yut Name Tag Game: Big Brothers Team (Yoo Jae-suk, Gary, Jee Seok-jin, Song Ji-hyo, Kim Hee-chul, Lim Yo-hwan); Younger Brothers Team (Haha, Kim Jong-kook, Lee Kwang-soo, Hani, Hong Jin-ho, Leeteuk)	Rival Big Match: Younger Brothers Team (Yoo Jae-suk, Gary, Jee Seok-jin, Song Ji-hyo, Kim Hee-chul, Lim Yo-hwan); Big Brothers Team (Haha, Kim Jong-kook, Lee Kwang-soo, Hani, Hong Jin-ho, Leeteuk)	Win the Rival Big Match	Younger Brothers Team Wins; Younger Brothers Team each received a trophy with a golden "R" badge.
276	December 6, 2015 (November 24, 2015)	No guests	SBS Broadcasting Center (Mok-dong, Yangcheon District, Seoul)	Jae-suk Team (Yoo Jae-suk, Haha, Song Ji-hyo); Jong-kook Team (Kim Jong-kook, Jee Seok-jin, Lee Kwang-soo)	Chasing Team (Gary)	Help Gary escape and retrieve the diamonds hidden in the cube	No winners The diamonds were scattered on the ground due to their scuffle.
277 (Note: Special appearance by SBS 8 News announcers Shin Dong-wook and Jung Mi-seon, actor Yeom Dong-heon as Operation Commander and research facility's director, actress Shin Se-hwi as the girl who is immune to the zombie virus.)	December 13, 2015 (December 7, 2015)	No guests	TBD	No teams		Infiltrate the research facility, rescue the most survivors and the girl who is immune to the Zombie Virus	No winners The members were all "infected", but they managed to complete the rescue mission.
278 (Note: Christmas Special.) (Note: Yoo Jae-suk only acted as host and did not participate in the race.)	December 20, 2015 (December 8, 2015)	Andy (Shinhwa) Bobby B.I (iKon) Chae-yeon Kim Ji-min Kim Jung-nam (Turbo) Lee Ji-hyun Lee Jong-soo Seolhyun (AOA) Stephanie (The Grace)	SBS Broadcasting Center (Mok-dong, Yangcheon District, Seoul)	X-mas Game Battle: Kim Team (Kim Jong-kook, Haha, Andy, Chae-yeon, Kim Jung-nam, Lee Ji-hyun, Lee Jong-soo, Stephanie); Ji Team (Jee Seok-jin, Gary, Lee Kwang-soo, Song Ji-hyo, Bobby, B.I, Kim Ji-min, Seolhyun)	Find the X-man: Mission Team (Kim Jong-kook, Lee Kwang-soo); Chasing Team (Gary, Haha, Jee Seok-jin, Song Ji-hyo, Andy, Bobby, B.I, Chae-yeon, Kim Ji-min, Kim Jung-nam, Lee Ji-hyun, Lee Jong-soo, Seolhyun, Stephanie)	Identify the X-Man	Mission Team Wins ₩170 million was donated to a charity under the winners' names.
279	December 27, 2015 (December 8, 2015)	Andy (Shinhwa) Bobby B.I (iKon) Chae-yeon Kim Ji-min Kim Jung-nam (Turbo) Lee Ji-hyun Lee Jong-soo Seolhyun (AOA) Stephanie (The Grace)	SBS Broadcasting Center (Mok-dong, Yangcheon District, Seoul)	X-mas Game Battle: Kim Team (Kim Jong-kook, Haha, Andy, Chae-yeon, Kim Jung-nam, Lee Ji-hyun, Lee Jong-soo, Stephanie); Ji Team (Jee Seok-jin, Gary, Lee Kwang-soo, Song Ji-hyo, Bobby, B.I, Kim Ji-min, Seolhyun)	Find the X-man: Mission Team (Kim Jong-kook, Lee Kwang-soo); Chasing Team (Gary, Haha, Jee Seok-jin, Song Ji-hyo, Andy, Bobby, B.I, Chae-yeon, Kim Ji-min, Kim Jung-nam, Lee Ji-hyun, Lee Jong-soo, Seolhyun, Stephanie)	Identify the X-Man	Mission Team Wins ₩170 million was donated to a charity under the winners' names.
279	December 27, 2015 (December 8, 2015)	No guests	SBS Broadcasting Center (Mok-dong, Yangcheon District, Seoul)	Ping Pong Unity: Yoo Jae-suk & Lee Kwang-soo; Gary & Kim Jong-kook; Haha & Song Ji-hyo; Jee Seok-jin (Note: Jee Seok-jin became partners with his VJ, Yoo Suk, for this game.)	Ladder of Fate: No teams	Avoid getting "LUCKY" in the ladder of fate	Gary, Haha, Jee Seok-jin, Kim Jong-kook, Lee Kwang-soo, Song Ji-hyo Wins; Yoo Jae-suk got the mud shower and received a golden lucky clover trophy.

== Ratings ==
- Ratings listed below are the individual corner ratings of Running Man. (Note: Individual corner ratings do not include commercial time, which regular ratings include.)

Ep. #	Original Airdate	TNmS Ratings	Naver Ratings
Ep. #	Original Airdate	Nationwide	
228	January 4, 2015	15.7%	17.8%
229	January 11, 2015	14.7%	15.8%
230	January 18, 2015	12.0%	11.3%
231	January 25, 2015	10.3%	10.8%
232	February 1, 2015	11.3%	12.8%
233	February 8, 2015	10.4%	11.6%
234	February 15, 2015	11.0%	12.6%
235	February 22, 2015	10.6%	12.0%
236	March 1, 2015	10.3%	11.1%
237	March 8, 2015	11.2%	12.1%
238	March 15, 2015	10.0%	10.6%
239	March 22, 2015	9.7%	9.5%
240	March 29, 2015	11.0%	10.9%
241	April 5, 2015	10.7%	10.3%
242	April 12, 2015	10.8%	10.3%
243	April 19, 2015	9.7%	9.3%
244	April 26, 2015	9.5%	8.8%
245	May 3, 2015	9.0%	8.5%
246	May 10, 2015	8.7%	9.2%
247	May 17, 2015	10.5%	9.9%
248	May 24, 2015	8.2%	8.1%
249	May 31, 2015	9.8%	10.3%
250	June 7, 2015	9.3%	10.7%
251	June 14, 2015	10.4%	11.0%
252	June 21, 2015	7.4%	7.4%
253	June 28, 2015	8.2%	8.0%
254	July 5, 2015	9.1%	9.7%
255	July 12, 2015	11.3%	11.0%
256	July 19, 2015	9.4%	8.9%
257	July 26, 2015	8.4%	7.7%
258	August 2, 2015	7.9%	6.8%
259	August 9, 2015	9.2%	9.0%
260	August 16, 2015	10.6%	9.4%
261	August 23, 2015	8.2%	8.6%
262	August 30, 2015	8.6%	8.9%
263	September 6, 2015	7.9%	8.7%
264	September 13, 2015	8.1%	7.7%
265	September 20, 2015	8.1%	9.0%
266	September 27, 2015	7.5%	7.5%
267	October 4, 2015	8.5%	8.7%
268	October 11, 2015	10.0%	10.8%
269	October 18, 2015	7.8%	8.9%
270	October 25, 2015	8.8%	10.1%
271	November 1, 2015	10.1%	9.6%
272	November 8, 2015	6.5%	8.0%
273	November 15, 2015	4.4%	5.4%
274	November 22, 2015	5.2%	5.5%
275	November 29, 2015	4.8%	6.1%
276	December 6, 2015	5.2%	6.4%
277	December 13, 2015	4.5%	4.8%
278	December 20, 2015	6.4%	6.9%
279	December 27, 2015	7.4%	6.9%
