= Science Museum =

Science Museum may refer to:

- Science museum, a type of museum
- Arktikum Science Museum, a museum in Rovaniemi, Finland
- Hong Kong Science Museum, a museum in Kowloon, Hong Kong
- Science Museum of the University of Coimbra, a museum in Coimbra, Portugal.

== United Kingdom ==
- Science Museum, Birmingham, a former name of the Museum of Science and Industry, Birmingham
- Science Museum, London, a museum in London
- Science and Industry Museum, Manchester
- Science Museum at Wroughton, the object store for the London Science Museum, near Swindon, Wiltshire

== United States ==
- Museum of Science (Boston)
- Science Museum Oklahoma, a museum in Oklahoma City, Oklahoma
- Science Museum of Virginia, a museum in Richmond, Virginia
- Science Museum of Minnesota, a museum in Saint Paul, Minnesota.

== See also ==
- List of science museums
- National Science Museum (disambiguation)
- National Museum of Science (disambiguation)
- Science and Technology Museum (disambiguation)
