= UTM-02 =

South Korean maglev train

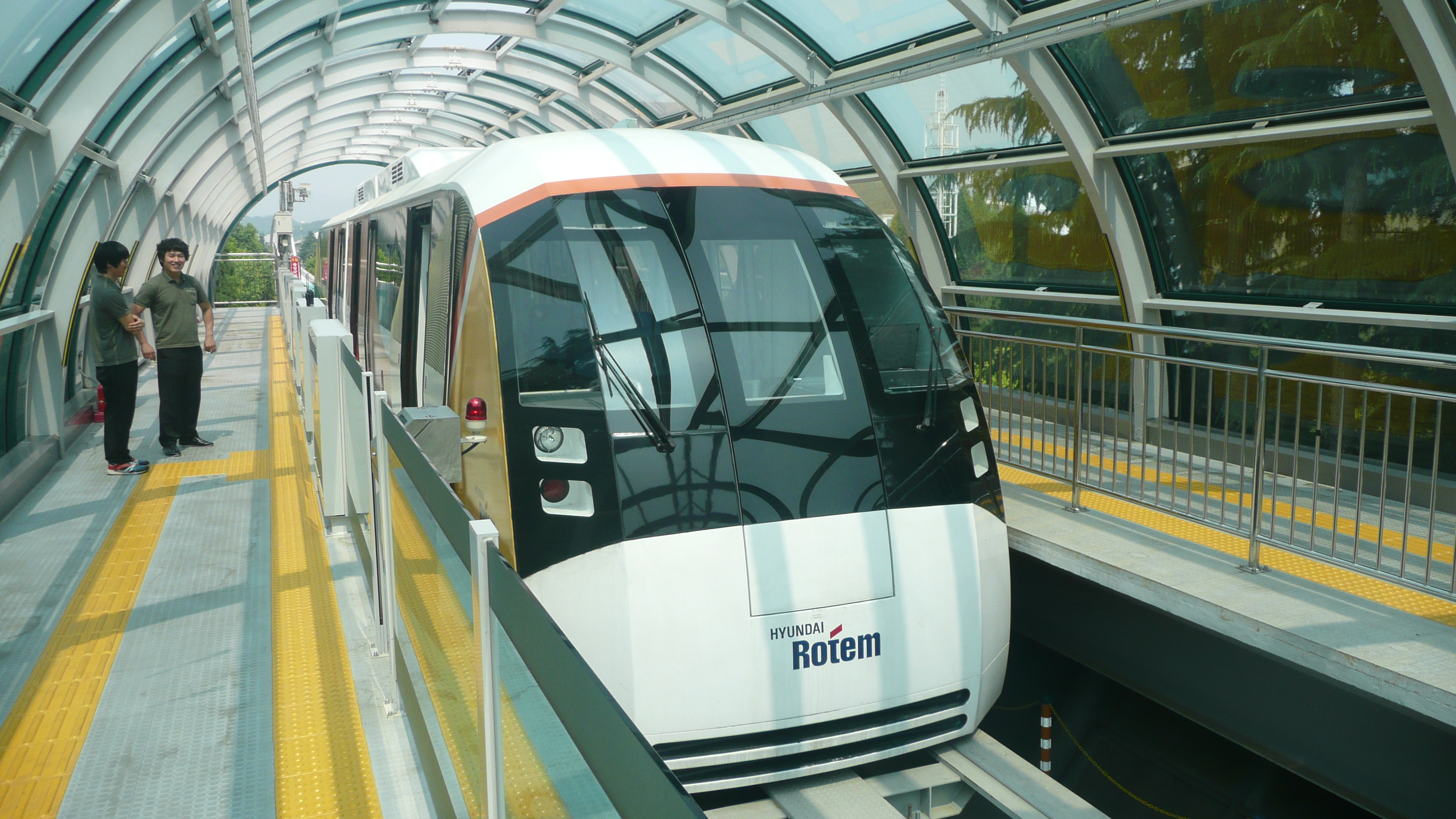
- UTM-02 in 2011
- Stock type: Maglev
- Manufacturer: Hyundai Rotem
- Constructed: 2003

Specifications
- Train length: 13,500 millimetres (530 in)
- Width: 2,850 millimetres (112 in)
- Height: 3,500 millimetres (140 in)
- Maximum speed: 110 kilometres per hour (68 mph)
- Weight: 20 tonnes (20 long tons; 22 short tons)

UTM-02 is a South Korean maglev train developed for the continuous research of magnetic levitation trains. The vehicle development was undertaken by the Korea Institute of Machinery and Materials. It was used on the National Science Museum Maglev line.

== History ==
In 1989, South Korea began developing a maglev train at the Korea Institute of Machinery and Materials as a national research and development project. Hyundai Rotem, a company participating in the development project, succeeded in developing a 30 km/h vehicle for the Expo '93 exhibition in Daejeon.

Afterwards, 43.5 billion won was invested in research and development to develop the pre-commercialization prototype UTM-01 in 1998 and UTM-02 in 2006. By developing UTM-02, the country secured the core technology for maglev trains.

UTM-02 were managed by Hyundai Rotem until 2011, but after the contract expired, the National Science Museum took over management of the vehicles.

== Technology ==
It was manufactured by Hyundai Rotem based on technology from the Korea Institute of Machinery and Materials.

It is the first maglev train to start commercial operation in South Korea. Like the Shinbundang Line and K-AGT, the driver's cabin is connected to the passenger compartment, allowing a full view. The levitation method is a superconducting suction type suitable for low-speed operation, and the average speed is 30 km/h.

== Gallery ==
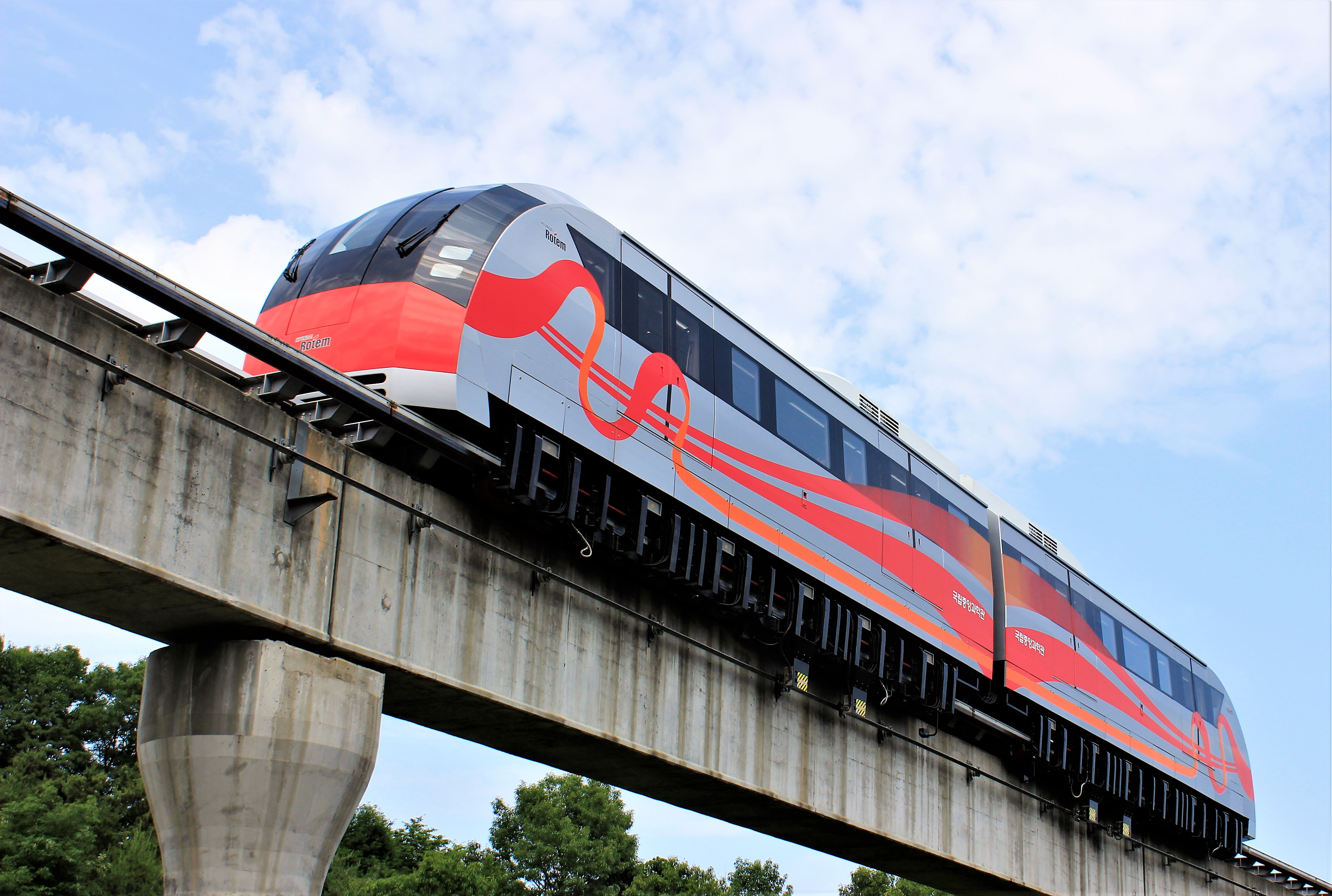
UTM-02 in operation at the National Science Museum

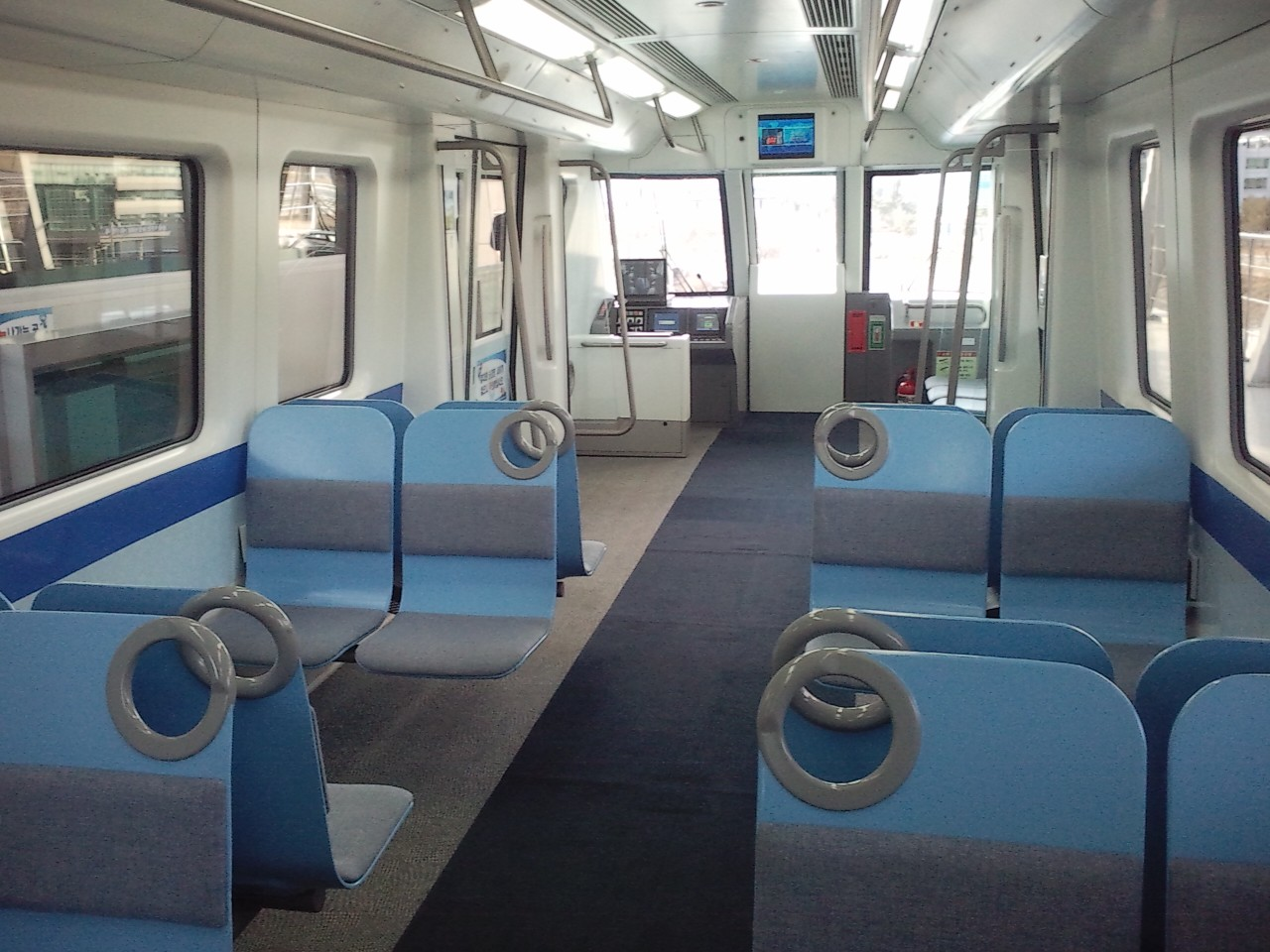
Interior

== See also ==
- National Science Museum Maglev
- Incheon Airport Maglev
- ECOBEE
