= National Science Museum =

National Science Museum may refer to:

- Science Museum (London)
- National Science Museum of Japan
- National Science Museum, South Korea, South Korea
- Gwacheon National Science Museum, South Korea
- National Science Museum, South Korea
- National Science Museum (Thailand)
