= National Science Museum Maglev =

2008–2020 maglev line in South Korea

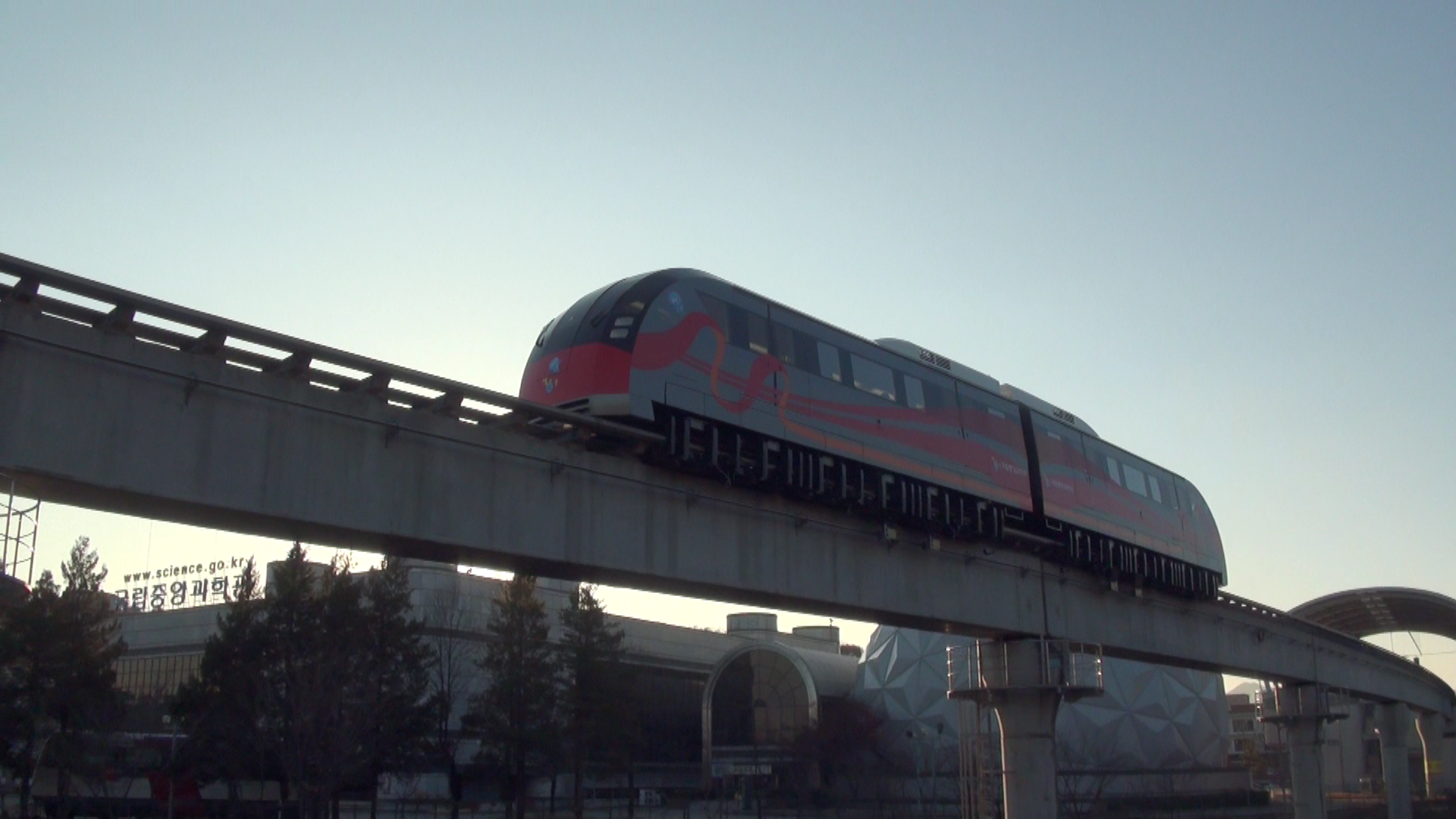
- UTM-02 in 2012

Overview
- Native name: 국립중앙과학관 자기부상열차 （國立中央科學館 磁氣浮上列車）
- Status: Closed
- Owner: National Science Museum

Service
- Type: Maglev

History
- Opened: 7 August 1993
- Closed: 31 December 2020

Technical
- Line length: 995 m (3,264 ft)
- Electrification: DC 600V→DC 1500V
- Operating speed: 80 km/h (50 mph)

The National Science Museum Maglev (Korean: 국립중앙과학관 자기부상열차) was a maglev line in Daejeon, South Korea that opened on 21 April 2008 and closed on 31 December 2020. It was a 995 m (3,264 ft) long line that connected the National Science Museum to the Expo Science Park in Yuseong District. It was the first maglev train line to begin commercial operation in the country.

== History ==
The National Science Museum carried out installation work on infrastructure such as bridge piers, tracks, and stations from 2005 to May 2007. In June 2007, Hyundai Rotem and the Korea Institute of Machinery and Materials completed the comprehensive test run after installing UTM-02.

On April 21, 2008, the line was opened, running 16 round trips daily on the 995 m (3,264 ft) track between the National Science Museum and Expo Science Park.

As part of the 2014 Expo Science Park re-creation project, half of the section was demolished, leading to a sharp drop in visitors, and operations were completely suspended in 2020 due to the COVID-19 pandemic. It was demolished in May 2021 after 13 years of operation.

== Rolling stock ==
The rolling stock was UTM-02 manufactured by Hyundai Rotem, and was operated in a basic 2-car trainset. The design speed was 80 km/h, but considering the short section, the actual operating speed was 30 km/h.
