= List of Running Man episodes (2014) =

- No. of episodes: 49

Release
- Original network: SBS
- Original release: January 5 – December 28, 2014

Season chronology
- ← Previous; 2013 Next → 2015

This is a list of episodes of the South Korean variety show Running Man in 2014. The show airs on SBS as part of their Good Sunday lineup.

== Episodes ==
List of episodes (episode 179–227)
Ep.	Broadcast Date (Filming Date)	Guest(s)	Landmark	Teams		Mission	Results
179 (Note: New Year's Special.) (Note: Special appearance by actor Lee Kye-in in celebrity chef Raymon Kim, Korean cuisine expert Shim Young-soon, webtoonist Jung Da-jung, chocolatier Louis Kang as judges.)	January 5, 2014 (December 16, 2013)	Jae-kyung (Rainbow) John Park Kim Kyung-ho Lee Dong-wook Park Soo-hong Song Kyung Ah Sung-kyu (Infinite)	La Cuisine (Jung District, Seoul)	Yoo Jae-suk & Park Soo-hong; Gary & Jae-kyung; Haha & Sung-kyu; Jee Seok-jin & Kim Kyung-ho; Kim Jong-kook & Song Kyung Ah; Lee Kwang-soo & John Park; Song Ji-hyo & Lee Dong-wook		Cook the best first weekend dinner of 2014	Kim Jong-kook & Song Kyung Ah Wins; Kim Jong-kook & Song Kyung Ah each received a golden horse.
180	January 12, 2014 (December 16, 2013)	Jae-kyung (Rainbow) John Park Kim Kyung-ho Lee Dong-wook Park Soo-hong Song Kyung Ah Sung-kyu (Infinite)	La Cuisine (Jung District, Seoul)	Yoo Jae-suk & Park Soo-hong; Gary & Jae-kyung; Haha & Sung-kyu; Jee Seok-jin & Kim Kyung-ho; Kim Jong-kook & Song Kyung Ah; Lee Kwang-soo & John Park; Song Ji-hyo & Lee Dong-wook		Cook the best first weekend dinner of 2014	Kim Jong-kook & Song Kyung Ah Wins; Kim Jong-kook & Song Kyung Ah each received a golden horse.
181	January 19, 2014 (December 17, 2013)	Lee Jong-suk Lee Se-young Park Bo-young	Duckdo Elementary School (Yangju, Gyeonggi Province)	Male Student Team (Yoo Jae-suk, Gary, Haha, Jee Seok-jin, Lee Jong-suk); Female Student Team (Kim Jong-kook, Lee Kwang-soo, Song Ji-hyo, Lee Se-young, Park Bo-young)	Secret Couple (Song Ji-hyo, Lee Jong-suk)	Find the "secret couple"	Male Student Team Wins; Song Ji-hyo and Lee Jong-suk were sprayed with flour.
182 (Note: Special appearance by actor Yoon Seo-hyun and actress Wang Bit-na.)	January 26, 2014 (January 6, 2014)	Do-hee (Tiny-G) Si-wan (ZE:A) Yeo Jin-goo	SBS Tanhyeon-dong Production Center (Ilsanseo District, Goyang, Gyeonggi Province)	Gallop Horses: Yoo Jae-suk & Jee Seok-jin; Gary & Lee Kwang-soo; Haha & Yeo Jin-goo; Kim Jong-kook & Do-hee; Song Ji-hyo & Si-wan; Running Land Big 3: Yoo Jae-suk & Yeo Jin-goo; Gary & Song Ji-hyo; Haha & Do-hee; Jee Seok-jin & Lee Kwang-soo; Kim Jong-kook & Si-wan	Janggi Piece Rank Race: Han (Yoo Jae-suk, Gary, Jee Seok-jin, Do-hee, Yeo Jin-goo); Cho (Haha, Kim Jong-kook, Lee Kwang-soo, Song Ji-hyo, Si-wan)	Defeat the other team	Han Wins; Han team members each received a gold janggi piece.
183	February 2, 2014 (January 20, 2014)	Jo Min-su Moon So-ri Uhm Jung-hwa	SBS Broadcasting Center (Mok-dong, Yangcheon District, Seoul)	No teams		Identify the "Partners of Fate"	Everyone Wins; Everyone received a gold ring.
184 (Note: Sochi Winter Olympics Special.) (Note: Special appearance by announcer Kim Hwan through a video.)	February 9, 2014 (January 27, 2014)	Baro (B1A4) Kang Ye-won Park Seo-joon Seo In-guk Son Ho-jun	Minjok Muyewon (Danwol-myeon, Yangpyeong County, Gangwon Province)	Running Man Team (Yoo Jae-suk, Gary, Haha, Jee Seok-jin, Lee Kwang-soo, Song Ji-hyo)	All Star Team (Kim Jong-kook, Baro, Kang Ye-won, Park Seo-joon, Seo In-guk, Son Ho-jun)	Defeat the other team	Running Man Team Wins; Running Man Team members each received a gold Taegeuk badge.
185 (Note: Special appearance by actress Kim Hyun-soo.)	February 16, 2014 (February 4, 2014)	No guests	Gwacheon National Science Museum (Gwacheon-dong, Gwacheon, Gyeonggi Province)	Cheon Song-yi (Yoo Jae-suk); Do Min-joon (Haha)	Absolute Villain (Kim Jong-kook); Mission Team (Gary, Jee Seok-jin, Lee Kwang-soo, Song Ji-hyo)	"My Love From Another Star" theme - Ride the flying saucer.	Yoo Jae-suk Wins; Yoo Jae-suk received a gold medal necklace.
186	February 23, 2014 (February 10, 2014)	Jung Yong-hwa Kang Min-hyuk Lee Jong-hyun Lee Jung-shin (CNBLUE) Shim Eun-kyung	City of Seoul favourite tourist sites including: N Seoul Tower; The Shilla Duty Free Shop (Jangchung-dong, Jung District, Seoul)	Yellow Team (Yoo Jae-suk, Gary, Haha, Jee Seok-jin); Red Team (Kim Jong-kook, Lee Kwang-soo, Song Ji-hyo, Shim Eun-kyung); Blue Team (Jung Yong-hwa, Kang Min-hyuk, Lee Jong-hyun, Lee Jung-shin)		Earn medals for the roulette wheel	Blue Team Wins
187	March 2, 2014 (February 11, 2014)	No guests	Han River (Mapo District, Seoul)	Korea University Team (Yoo Jae-suk, Korea University students); Sungshin Women's University Team (Gary, Sungshin Women's University students); Dongguk University Team (Haha, Dongguk University students); Kyung Hee University Team (Jee Seok-jin, Kyung Hee University students); Chung-Ang University Team (Kim Jong-kook, Chung-Ang University students); Sogang University Team (Lee Kwang-soo, Sogang University students); Konkuk University Team (Song Ji-hyo, Konkuk University students)		2014 Running Man University Competition - Cross the Han River	Konkuk University Team Wins; Students from the top 3 teams each received scholarship, with Sungshin University Team and Korea University Team finished 2nd and 3rd respectively.
188 (Note: Australia Special.) (Note: Song Ji-hyo was unable to attend on the first day (ep 188) due to scheduling conflicts.)	March 9, 2014 (February 23, 2014)	Kim Woo-bin Rain	Palm Beach (Gold Coast, Queensland, Australia)	Yoo Jae-suk & Kim Woo-bin; Gary & Jee Seok-jin; Haha & Kim Jong-kook; Lee Kwang-soo & Rain		Find the four elements	Kim Jong-kook & Rain Wins; Kim Jong-kook and Rain received a golden ball.
189	March 16, 2014 (February 24, 2014)	Kim Woo-bin Rain	Royal Exhibition Building (Melbourne, Victoria, Australia)	Yoo Jae-suk & Jee Seok-jin; Gary & Haha; Kim Jong-kook & Rain; Lee Kwang-soo & Kim Woo-bin	Goddess of Earth (Song Ji-hyo)	Find the four elements	Kim Jong-kook & Rain Wins; Kim Jong-kook and Rain received a golden ball.
190	March 23, 2014 (March 10, 2014)	Gong Hyung-jin Kang Ha-neul Kim Ji-seok Ku Hye-sun Kwon Hae-hyo Lee Sang-yoon Seung-ri (Big Bang)	Seoul Metropolitan Fire Academy (Banghak-dong, Dobong District, Seoul)	Running Man Team (Yoo Jae-suk, Gary, Haha, Jee Seok-jin, Kim Jong-kook, Lee Kwang-soo, Song Ji-hyo)	Angel Eyes Team (Gong Hyung-jin, Kang Ha-neul, Kim Ji-seok, Ku Hye-sun, Kwon Hae-hyo, Lee Sang-yoon, Seung-ri)	Complete the fire fighting relay course	Running Man Team Wins; Running Man Team received two gold envelopes of money.
191	March 30, 2014 (February 25, 2014)	Kim Woo-bin Rain	Sovereign Hill (Ballarat, Victoria, Australia)	No teams		Defeat the other members	Kim Woo-bin Wins; Kim Woo-bin received a reward money.
192 (Note: Special appearance by Lee Hyo-ri.)	April 6, 2014 (March 17, 2014)	Kim Dong-jun (ZE:A) Kim Jung-nan Kim Min-jong Lee Sang-hwa Lim Ju-hwan Oh Man-seok Ryu Seung-soo	Ttangkkeut Auto Camp (Haenam County, South Jeolla Province)	Yoo Jae-suk & Ryu Seung-soo; Gary & Lee Sang-hwa; Haha & Oh Man-seok; Jee Seok-jin & Kim Jung-nan; Kim Jong-kook & Kim Min-jong; Lee Kwang-soo & Lim Ju-hwan; Song Ji-hyo & Kim Dong-jun		Arrive at the final venue first	Lee Kwang-soo & Lim Ju-hwan Wins; Lee Kwang-soo and Lim Ju-hwan got to sleep in a motorhome for the night.
193	April 13, 2014 (March 17–18, 2014)	Kim Dong-jun (ZE:A) Kim Jung-nan Kim Min-jong Lee Sang-hwa Lim Ju-hwan Oh Man-seok Ryu Seung-soo	Ttangkkeut Auto Camp (Haenam County, South Jeolla Province)	Mafia Team (Jee Seok-jin, Kim Jung-nan, Kim Min-jong, Oh Man-seok)	Citizen Team (Yoo Jae-suk, Gary, Haha, Kim Jong-kook, Lee Kwang-soo, Song Ji-hyo, Kim Dong-jun, Lee Sang-hwa, Lim Ju-hwan, Ryu Seung-soo)	Find the mafia	Mafia Team Wins; Jee Seok-jin, Kim Jung-nan, Kim Min-jong and Oh Man-seok received ten gold "R" badges.
194	May 4, 2014 (March 18, 2014)	Kim Dong-jun (ZE:A) Kim Jung-nan Kim Min-jong Lee Sang-hwa Lim Ju-hwan Oh Man-seok Ryu Seung-soo	Ttangkkeut Auto Camp (Haenam County, South Jeolla Province)	Mafia Team (Jee Seok-jin, Kim Jung-nan, Kim Min-jong, Oh Man-seok)	Citizen Team (Yoo Jae-suk, Gary, Haha, Kim Jong-kook, Lee Kwang-soo, Song Ji-hyo, Kim Dong-jun, Lee Sang-hwa, Lim Ju-hwan, Ryu Seung-soo)	Find the mafia	Mafia Team Wins; Jee Seok-jin, Kim Jung-nan, Kim Min-jong and Oh Man-seok received ten gold "R" badges.
195 (Note: Yoo Jae-suk only acted as host and did not participate in the race.) (Note: Jo Jung-chi (Shinchireem) had to leave after the first mission due to scheduling conflicts and was replaced by Eddy Kim for the second mission.)	May 11, 2014 (April 7, 2014)	Chansung Jun. K Junho Nichkhun Wooyoung (2PM) CL Minzy Park Bom Sandara Park (2NE1) Jo Jung-chi (Shinchireem) Muzie Yoon Jong-shin	Seoul Energy Dream Center (Sangam-dong, Mapo District, Seoul)	2NE1 Team (Gary, Kim Jong-kook, CL, Minzy, Park Bom, Sandara Park); Mystic 89 Team (Haha, Jee Seok-jin, Lee Kwang-soo, Jo Jung-chi, Muzie, Yoon Jong-shin); 2PM Team (Song Ji-hyo, Chansung, Jun. K, Junho, Nichkhun, Wooyoung)		Defeat the other teams	2NE1 Team Wins; 2NE1 Team received a gold trophy.
196 (Note: Special appearance by Kim Sung-ki, Seo Ki-won, Son Min-hyuk, and Jung Se-yeop from Gag Tonight.)	May 18, 2014 (April 8, 2014)	No guests	Severance Hospital (Sinchon-dong, Seodaemun District, Seoul)	Kook-mes Bond (Kim Jong-kook) (Note: They traveled back to April 22, 2012 to rewrite the episode 91 (Yoo-mes Bond Episode). Kim Jong-kook took the pill and became the lead role.)	Mission Team (Yoo Jae-suk, Haha, Jee Seok-jin, Lee Kwang-soo, Gary, Song Ji-hyo)	Kook-mes Bond; Eliminate the others before they escape. Mission Team; Find the right key and escape.	Gary and Song Ji-hyo Win; Everyone else had to wear a larger nametag.
196	May 18, 2014 (April 8, 2014)	No guests	Severance Hospital (Sinchon-dong, Seodaemun District, Seoul)	Lupin (Lee Kwang-soo) (Note: They traveled back to January 29, 2012 to rewrite the episode 79 (Lupin vs. Sherlock Holmes Episode) where Jee Seok-jin was Lupin. Lee Kwang-soo took the pill and became the lead role.)	Mission Team (Yoo Jae-suk, Haha, Jee Seok-jin, Kim Jong-kook, Gary, Song Ji-hyo)	Lupin; Find everyone's nametag and eliminate them. Mission Team; Figure out who Lupin is an eliminate him.	Haha, Kim Jong-kook, and Gary Win; Everyone else had to wear a larger nametag.
196	May 18, 2014 (April 8, 2014)	No guests	Severance Hospital (Sinchon-dong, Seodaemun District, Seoul)	Space Controller (Yoo Jae-suk); Sixth Sense (Kim Jong-kook); Death Note (Jee Seok-Jin); Mind Controller and Deflector (Haha) (Note: They traveled back to December 25, 2011 to rewrite the episode 74 (Superpowers Episode). Haha took the pill and he was the one who decided the superpowers of all the members.); Phoenix (Gary); Duplicator (Song Ji-Hyo); Time Controller (Lee Kwang-Soo)		Defeat the other members.	Song Ji-hyo Wins
197 (Note: Special appearance by Apink.)	May 25, 2014 (May 19, 2014)	No guests	Jamsil Students' Gymnasium (Jamsil-dong, Songpa District, Seoul)	Yoo Jae-suk & Chungbuk National University; Gary & Gyeonggi University; Haha & Incheon National University; Jee Seok-jin & Jeonbuk National University; Kim Jong-kook & Gangwon National University; Lee Kwang-soo & Goryeo University; Song Ji-hyo & Busan National University		Defeat the other teams	Jee Seok-jin & Jeonbuk National University Wins; Students from the top 2 teams each received scholarship, with Yoo Jae-suk & Chungbuk National University finished 2nd.
198	June 1, 2014 (May 20, 2014)	Choi Hee Ha Yeon-soo Han Hye-jin Jin Se-yeon Min-ah (Girl's Day) Narsha (Brown Eyed Girls) Park Seo-joon	Samcheong-dong (Jongno District, Seoul)	Yoo Jae-suk & Jin Se-yeon; Gary & Min-ah; Haha & Han Hye-jin; Jee Seok-jin & Choi Hee; Kim Jong-kook & Ha Yeon-soo; Lee Kwang-soo & Narsha; Song Ji-hyo & Park Seo-joon		Have the strongest rock	Yoo Jae-suk & Jin Se-yeon Wins; Yoo Jae-suk & Jin Se-yeon received a 1 carat diamond ring.
199 (Note: Baro (B1A4), Dong-jun (ZE:A), Lee Chang-min (2AM), Lee Gi-kwang, Yang Yo-seob, Yoon Doo-joon (BEAST), Lee Min-hyuk (BtoB), Leo (VIXX) only appeared on ep 199 to compete in a mission. Special appearance by announcer Bae Sung-jae, sports commentator Park Moon-sung, Baek Ji-young, Seol Ki-hyeon in ep 199 and Cha Bum-kun on both ep 199-200. Special appearance by Gianluca Zambrotta, Stephan El Shaarawy, Jong Tae-se during the Asian Dream Cup match.)	June 8, 2014 (May 26, 2014)	Park Ji-sung	Homeplus Cheongna Store (Cheongna-dong, Seo District, Incheon)	Team Park Ji-sung (Park Ji-sung, Yoo Jae-suk, Gary, Haha, Jee Seok-jin, Kim Jong-kook, Lee Kwang-soo, Song Ji-hyo)	Team Seol Ki-hyeon and Idols (Baro, Kim Dong-jun, Lee Chang-min, Lee Gi-kwang, Lee Min-hyuk, Leo, Yang Yo-seob, Yoon Doo-joon)	Defeat the other team	Team Seol Ki-hyeon and Idols Wins
200	June 15, 2014 (June 2 & 3, 2014)	Park Ji-sung	Taman Safari (Bogor, West Java, Indonesia)	No teams		Complete the Dream Cup or safari mission	Everyone Wins
201	June 22, 2014 (May 13, 2014)	Bo-ra (Sistar) Chansung (2PM) Choi Min-ho (Shinee) Hoya Sung-kyu (Infinite) Jin-young (B1A4) Kang Min-hyuk (CNBLUE)	Ganghwado (Ganghwa County, Incheon)	Country Idols (Yoo Jae-suk, Gary, Haha, Jee Seok-jin, Kim Jong-kook, Lee Kwang-soo, Song Ji-hyo)	City Idols (Bo-ra, Chansung, Choi Min-ho, Hoya, Jin-young, Kang Min-hyuk, Sung-kyu)	Defeat the other team	Country Idols Wins; The Country Idols members each received a gold ring.
202	June 29, 2014 (June 16, 2014)	Baek Sung-hyun Cha Yu-ram Fabien Heo Kyung-hwan Ji Sung Ju Ji-hoon Sam Okyere Son Na-eun Yoon Bo-mi (Apink)	BlueOne Water Park (Bodeok-dong, Gyeongju, North Gyeongsang Province)	Idol Main Character Team (Gary, Son Na-eun, Yoon Bo-mi); Global Main Character Team (Haha, Fabien, Sam Okyere); Sports Main Character Team (Jee Seok-jin, Kim Jong-kook, Cha Yu-ram); Movie Main Character Team (Lee Kwang-soo, Ji Sung, Ju Ji-hoon); Flower Looks Main Character Team (Song Ji-hyo, Baek Sung-hyun, Heo Kyung-hwan)		Defeat the other teams	Movie Main Character Team Wins; Lee Kwang-soo, Ji Sung, Ju Ji-hoon received 15 gold Cheomseongdae statues.
203	July 6, 2014 (June 17, 2014)	Baek Sung-hyun Cha Yu-ram Fabien Heo Kyung-hwan Ji Sung Ju Ji-hoon Sam Okyere Son Na-eun Yoon Bo-mi (Apink)	Hwasan Elementary School (Hwasan-myeon, Yeongcheon, North Gyeongsang Province)	Best Face Couple (Yoo Jae-suk & Ju Ji-hoon); Billiards Couple (Gary & Cha Yu-ram); Event Couple (Haha & Heo Kyung-hwan); Siblings Couple (Jee Seok-jin & Song Ji-hyo); Blind Date Couple (Kim Jong-kook & Son Na-eun); 1 Year Anniversary Couple (Baek Sung-hyun & Yoon Bo-mi); Tourist Couple (Fabien & Sam Okyeye)	Client & Troubleshooter (Lee Kwang-soo & Ji Sung)	Defeat the other teams	Client & Troubleshooter Wins; Kim Jong-kook & Son Na-eun received the 1st place prize money. Lee Kwang-soo & Ji Sung received the 2nd-4th place prize money.
204	July 13, 2014 (June 30, 2014)	Ryu Seung-soo	Petite France (Gapyeong, Gyeonggi-do)	No teams		Defeat the other members	Song Ji-hyo Wins; Song Ji-hyo received 7 gold nuggets.
205	July 20, 2014 (July 7, 2014)	Baek Ji-young Fei (Miss A) Hong Jin-young Kang Seung-hyun Lee Guk-joo	Book & Book Distribution Center (Ilsandong District, Goyang, Gyeonggi Province)	Red Team (Yoo Jae-suk, Jee Seok-jin, Lee Kwang-soo, Song Ji-hyo, Kang Seung-hyun, Lee Guk-joo)	Blue Team (Gary, Haha, Kim Jong-kook, Baek Ji-young, Fei, Hong Jin-young)	Throw the rings into the bar	Blue Team Wins; Blue Team received all the earned prizes.
206	July 27, 2014 (July 8, 2014)	Hong Seok-cheon Joo Won	Ranee Chef Academy (Sinchon-dong, Seodaemun District, Seoul)	Blue Team (Yoo Jae-suk, Lee Kwang-soo, Joo Won); Orange Team (Gary, Jee Seok-jin, Song Ji-hyo); Green Team (Haha, Kim Jong-kook, Hong Seok-cheon)		Cook the best instant fusion cuisine meal	Green Team Wins; Green Team received 3 gold "R" badges.
207	August 3, 2014 (July 21, 2014)	Heechul (Super Junior) Kim Je-dong Lee So-yeon Nam Hee-suk Park Soo-hong	Nongshim Theme Park (Deogyang District, Goyang, Gyeonggi Province)	Running Man Team (Yoo Jae-suk, Gary, Haha, Kim Jong-kook, Lee Kwang-soo, Song Ji-hyo)	JSJ Team (Jee Seok-jin, Heechul, Kim Je-dong, Lee So-yeon, Nam Hee-suk, Park Soo-hong)	Earn more gold bars	Running Man Team Wins; Running Man Team received 14 gold bars and shared 2 with JSJ Team. (Note: Running Man Team received the gold bars as JSJ Team failed the final mission.)
208	August 10, 2014 (July 28, 2014)	Suzy (Miss A)	Hyundai Department Store (Mok-dong, Yangcheon District, Seoul)	I Am Your Paparazzi: Hallyu Giraffe Team (Lee Kwang-soo, Yoo Jae-suk); Hallyu Suzy Team (Suzy, Gary, Haha, Jee Seok-jin, Kim Jong-kook, Song Ji-hyo); Star's Physique Management: Hallyu Giraffe Team (Lee Kwang-soo, Yoo Jae-suk, Jee Seok-jin); Hallyu Suzy Team (Suzy, Gary, Haha, Kim Jong-kook, Song Ji-hyo)	Hallyu Star Handprinting: Hallyu Giraffe Team (Lee Kwang-soo, Yoo Jae-suk, Haha, Jee Seok-jin); Hallyu Suzy Team (Suzy, Gary, Kim Jong-kook, Song Ji-hyo); All-Kill Bells Take the Name Tags: Hallyu Giraffe Team (Lee Kwang-soo, Yoo Jae-suk, Haha); Hallyu Suzy Team (Suzy, Gary, Jee Seok-jin, Kim Jong-kook, Song Ji-hyo)	Defeat the other team	Hallyu Suzy Team Wins; Suzy received a gold trophy.
209	August 17, 2014 (July 29, 2014)	Chun Myung-hoon (NRG) Danny Ahn (g.o.d) Eun Ji-won (Sechs Kies) Kai Se-hun (Exo) Lee Tae-min (Shinee) Moon Hee-joon (H.O.T.) So-you (Sistar)	Gwangneung Bonsai Art Park (Pocheon, Gyeonggi Province)	Running Idol Team (Yoo Jae-suk, Gary, Jee Seok-jin, Lee Kwang-soo, Song Ji-hyo); New Idol Team (Haha, Kai, Se-hun, So-you, Tae-min); Original Idol Team (Kim Jong-kook, Chun Myung-hoon, Danny Ahn, Eun Ji-won, Moon Hee-joon)		Solve the mystery of the triangle	Running Idol Team Wins
210 (Note: Special appearance by Lee Kwang-seob, Yang Sang-guk, Noh Sa-yeon, Jung Chan-woo, Jung Sun-hee, Jin Jung-sun, Jung Ho-yeon, Jia (Miss A), HA:TFELT, Sunmi (Wonder Girls), Lee Jung-shin (CNBLUE), Kim So-young (actress), Rose Motel, No Brain, Garlixx, Moon Kyung-eun, Seoul SK Nights Basketball Team, Wooyoung, Chansung (2PM), AOA, Kang Min-hyuk (CNBLUE), ESteem, Kim Tae-wook, Jang Ye-won, Hong In-kyu.)	August 24, 2014 (August 4, 2014)	Choi Bu-kyung Kim Hwan Kim Won-hyo Lee Hye-jeong Seolhyun (AOA) Wooyoung (2PM) Yook Joong-wan (Rose Motel)	SBS Prism Tower (Sangam-dong, Mapo District, Seoul)	Yoo Jae-suk & Kim Won-hyo; Gary & Lee Hye-jeong; Haha & Choi Bu-kyung; Jee Seok-jin & Seolhyun; Kim Jong-kook & Kim Hwan; Lee Kwang-soo & Wooyoung; Song Ji-hyo & Yook Joong-wan		Defeat the other teams in Alkkagi	Song Ji-hyo & Yook Joong-wan Wins; Song Ji-hyo & Yook Joong-wan received an Alkkagi board each. The supporters who guessed the winner correctly, received a gold bar.
211	August 31, 2014 (August 11, 2014)	Ailee Lim Seul-ong (2AM) Ji Chang-wook Kim Tae-woo Lee Sung-jae Skull Song Eun-yi	Incheon Children's Museum (Munhak-dong, Nam-gu, Incheon)	Yoo Jae-suk & Lee Sung-jae; Gary & Ailee; Haha & Skull; Jee Seok-jin & Song Eun-yi; Kim Jong-kook & Kim Tae-woo; Lee Kwang-soo & Ji Chang-wook; Song Ji-hyo & Lim Seul-ong		Reduce the number 1470 to 0 using mathematical symbols to escape the punishment in Taiwan	Gary & Ailee, Kim Jong-kook & Kim Tae-woo, Song Ji-hyo & Lim Seul-ong Wins; Yoo Jae-suk & Lee Sung-jae, Haha & Skull, Lee Kwang-soo & Ji Chang-wook, and Jee Seok-jin rode the Screaming Condor roller coaster. (Note: Song Eun-yi was unable to attend the punishment in Taiwan.)
212	September 7, 2014 (August 11, 2014)	Ailee Lim Seul-ong (2AM) Ji Chang-wook Kim Tae-woo Lee Sung-jae Skull Song Eun-yi	Leofoo Village Theme Park (Taiwan)	Yoo Jae-suk & Lee Sung-jae; Gary & Ailee; Haha & Skull; Jee Seok-jin & Song Eun-yi; Kim Jong-kook & Kim Tae-woo; Lee Kwang-soo & Ji Chang-wook; Song Ji-hyo & Lim Seul-ong		Reduce the number 1470 to 0 using mathematical symbols to escape the punishment in Taiwan	Gary & Ailee, Kim Jong-kook & Kim Tae-woo, Song Ji-hyo & Lim Seul-ong Wins; Yoo Jae-suk & Lee Sung-jae, Haha & Skull, Lee Kwang-soo & Ji Chang-wook, and Jee Seok-jin rode the Screaming Condor roller coaster.
213	September 21, 2014 (August 19, 2014)	Choi Yeo-jin Kim Min-seo Lee Yoo-ri Seo Woo Yoo In-young	Partyum Luna (Dongchun-1-dong, Yeonsu District, Incheon)	The red's earth desire, Destruction of Evidence: Yoo Jae-suk & Seo Woo; Gary & Lee Yoo-ri; Haha & Yoo In-young; Jee Seok-jin & Song Ji-hyo; Kim Jong-kook & Kim Min-seo; Lee Kwang-soo & Choi Yeo-jin	Final partners after swapping: Yoo Jae-suk & Kim Min-seo; Gary & Seo Woo; Haha & Yoo In-young; Jee Seok-jin & Lee Yoo-ri; Kim Jong-kook & Song Ji-hyo; Lee Kwang-soo & Choi Yeo-jin Second Generation Male Heir: Jee Seok-jin	Find the identity of the second generation male heir	Yoo Jae-suk & Kim Min-seo Wins; Yoo Jae-suk received a name plaque and Kim Min-seo received a gold "R" ring.
214 (Note: Special appearance by Olympic handball player Im Oh-kyung, Olympic badminton player Kim Dong-moon and Olympic basketball player Woo Ji-won.)	September 28, 2014 (September 1, 2014)	Alex Kim Ki-bang Krystal (f(x)) Park Young-gyu Rain	Judo Club (Gyeonggi Province)	Audition Race: Running Man Team (Gary, Haha, Jee Seok-jin, Kim Jong-kook, Lee Kwang-soo, Song Ji-hyo); My Lovely Girl Team (Yoo Jae-suk, Rain, Krystal, Park Young-gyu, Kim Ki-bang, Alex)	Final Audition Stage: Running Man Team (Gary, Jee Seok-jin, Kim Jong-kook, Lee Kwang-soo, Song Ji-hyo); My Lovely Girl Team (Yoo Jae-suk, Rain, Krystal, Kim Ki-bang); Judges (Haha, Alex, Park Young-gyu)	Pass the R-pop final auditions	My Lovely Girl Team Wins; Judges Park Young-gyu and Alex were punished. Judge Haha was saved by the winning team.
215	October 5, 2014 (September 23, 2014)	Jo Jung-suk Shin Min-a	Korea Job World (Bundang District, Seongnam, Gyeonggi Province)	Bride's Family Team (Yoo Jae-suk, Jee Seok-jin, Lee Kwang-soo, Song Ji-hyo, Shin Min-a)	Groom's Family Team (Gary, Haha, Kim Jong-kook, Jo Jung-suk)	Collect the lottery money	Groom's Family Team Wins; Groom Gary chose to share the money with bride Shin Min-a and the pair also received a couple rings.
216	October 12, 2014 (September 29, 2014)	No guests	Some Sevit (Banpo-dong, Seocho District, Seoul)	Running Heroes; Yoo Jae-suk as Yoo-perman; Gary as Gae Oh Gong; Haha as Ha Gil-dong; Jee Seok-jin as Jeetman; Kim Jong-kook as Kook-verine; Lee Kwang-soo as Kwang-vatar; Song Ji-hyo as Wonder Blank		Recover the super powers	Running Heroes Wins
217	October 19, 2014 (October 7, 2014)	Jo Jin-woong Kim Sung-kyun Oh Sang-jin	Sono Felice Equestrian Club (Hongcheon, Gangwon Province)	Death Bingo Race: The Upper Village Gang (Yoo Jae-suk, Haha, Jo Jin-woong, Kim Sung-kyun, Oh Sang-jin); The Lower Village Gang (Gary, Jee Seok-jin, Kim Jong-kook, Lee Kwang-soo, Song Ji-hyo)	Death Bingo Name Tag Elimination: No teams	Defeat other members in the "Death Bingo Race"	Kim Jong-kook Wins; Kim Jong-kook received a gold bingo board.
218 (Note: Jung Eun-ji (Apink) had to leave early after the girl's special mission due to scheduling conflicts.)	October 26, 2014 (October 6, 2014)	Jung Eun-ji (Apink) Kim Ji-hoon Oh Yeon-seo	Suwon Cultural Foundation SK Atrium (Suwon, Gyeonggi Province)	Mission Team (Yoo Jae-suk, Gary, Haha, Jee Seok-jin, Lee Kwang-soo, Song Ji-hyo, Jung Eun-ji, Kim Ji-hoon, Oh Yeon-seo)	Culprit (Kim Jong-kook)	Find the camera and take a picture with it to perform in the R Orchestra while avoiding the culprit.	Lee Kwang-soo Wins; Lee Kwang-soo received a trophy and a violin box.
219	November 2, 2014 (October 21, 2014)	Han Sang-jin Han Ye-seul Joo Sang-wook Jung Gyu-woon Wang Ji-hye	TBD	Board The Train Game: Red/White Knight Team (Yoo Jae-suk, Haha, Lee Kwang-soo, Han Sang-jin, Han Ye-seul); Blue/Black Knight Team (Gary, Kim Jong-kook, Jee Seok-jin, Song Ji-hyo, Joo Sang-wook, Jung Gyu-woon, Wang Ji-hye); Black And White Competition: Red/White Knight Team (Yoo Jae-suk, Kim Jong-kook, Lee Kwang-soo, Han Sang-jin, Han Ye-seul); Blue/Black Knight Team (Gary, Haha, Jee Seok-jin, Song Ji-hyo, Joo Sang-wook, Jung Gyu-woon, Wang Ji-hye)	Market Memory Mission: Red/White Knight Team (Yoo Jae-suk, Haha, Kim Jong-kook, Lee Kwang-soo, Han Ye-seul); Blue/Black Knight Team (Gary, Jee Seok-jin, Song Ji-hyo, Han Sang-jin, Joo Sang-wook, Jung Gyu-woon, Wang Ji-hye); Final Mission: Red/White Knight Team (Gary, Lee Kwang-soo, Song Ji-hyo, Han Sang-jin, Han Ye-seul); Blue/Black Knight Team (Yoo Jae-suk, Haha, Kim Jong-kook, Jee Seok-jin, Joo Sang-wook, Jung Gyu-woon, Wang Ji-hye)	White Knight Team mission: Gather all members Black Knight Team mission: Infiltrate White Knight Team	White Knight Team Wins
220	November 9, 2014 (October 27, 2014)	Jang Dong-min Kangnam (M.I.B) Kim Min-kyo Park Soo-hong Song Jae-rim	Nodeulseom (Yeouido, Hangang Bridge, Seoul)	Yoo Jae-suk & Jee Seok-jin; Gary & Kangnam; Haha & Kim Min-kyo; Kim Jong-kook & Park Soo-hong; Lee Kwang-soo & Song Jae-rim; Song Ji-hyo & Jang Dong-min		Escape the island by untying the ropes they chose that were tied to the boat	Haha & Kim Min-kyo Wins; Haha & Kim Min-kyo received a special dessert with a golden ring inside it.
221	November 16, 2014 (November 3, 2014)	Bobby Kim Hong Jin-young Jung-in Kim Kyung-ho Kim Yeon-woo Kyuhyun Leeteuk (Super Junior) Narsha (Brown Eyed Girls)	Hadong Green Tea Institute (Hadong County, South Gyeongsang Province)	Blue Team (Yoo Jae-suk, Kim Kyung-ho, Kim Yeon-woo); Black Team (Gary, Bobby Kim, Jung-in); Yellow Team (Haha, Jee Seok-jin, Narsha); White Team (Kim Jong-kook, Lee Kwang-soo, Hong Jin-young); Magenta Team (Song Ji hyo, Kyuhyun, Leeteuk)		Find the "R" marked microphones and stand on the real stage to Jiri Mountain concert	Blue Team Wins; Blue Team receives the 7 gifts Jiri mountain had to offer.
222	November 23, 2014 (November 4, 2014)	No guests	Agyang-myeon, Hadong-gun, Gyeongsangnam-do	Solve the Puzzle/Finding Food: No teams	Mars Vs Venus: Martians (Yoo Jae-suk, Gary, Haha, Jee Seok-jin, Lee Kwang-soo, Song Ji-hyo); Venusians (Kim Jong-kook)	Eliminate the other aliens from another planet and fly back to your home planet.	Song Ji-hyo Wins; Only Song Ji-hyo received gold bars, but she must take pictures in public places in her costume after filming.
223 (Note: Special appearances by actor Choi Hyun-ho as the chairman during the second mission; Brad Moore (Busker Busker), Chris Johnson, Fabien, Greg Priester, Jake Pains, John Rosenthal, and Mark Taylor only appeared during the third mission.)	November 30, 2014 (November 17, 2014)	No guests	Nexon Korea (Sampyeong-dong, Bundang District, Seongnam, Gyeonggi-do)	Go to Work Without Being Late/Flattery Pep Rally: No teams Conclude Negotiations — Nametag ripping: Running Man Team (Yoo Jae-suk, Gary, Haha, Jee Seok-jin, Kim Jong-kook, Lee Kwang-soo, Song Ji-hyo); Foreign Trade Buyers (Brad Moore, Chris Johnson, Fabien, Greg Priester, Jake Pains, John Rosenthal, Mark Taylor)	Rock Paper Scissor Game: Gae Line (Gary, Yoo Jae-suk, Song Ji-hyo); Ha Line (Haha, Kim Jong-kook); Kwang Line (Lee Kwang-soo, Jee Seok-jin)	Make yourself promoted to work by winning the game of rock-paper-scissors.	Ha Line Wins; Haha, Kim Jong-kook and ten supporters from their team received a gold bar each.
224	December 7, 2014 (November 18, 2014)	Han Groo Jeon So-min Kyung Soo-jin Lee Sung-kyung Song Ga-yeon	MTP Mall (Simgok-ro, Seo District, Incheon)	Choose the Mission Location: Yoo Jae-suk & Han Groo; Gary & Kyung Soo-jin; Haha & Lee Sung-kyung; Jee Seok-jin & Song Ji-hyo; Kim Jong-kook & Song Ga-yeon; Lee Kwang-soo & Jeon So-min	1 vs 5 Bell Hide-and-seek: Attackers (Gary & Kyung Soo-jin); Defense (Yoo Jae-suk & Han Groo, Haha & Lee Sung-kyung, Jee Seok-jin & Song Ji-hyo, Kim Jong-kook & Song Ga-yeon, Lee Kwang-soo & Jeon So-min)	Attackers mission: Rip off all Defense name tag before they reach final location Defense mission: Find right size of S pole Magnet prior to their N pole Magnet, avoid Attackers and proceed to final location	Gary & Kyung Soo-jin Wins; Gary & Kyung Soo-jin received a pair of gold "R" couple rings.
225	December 14, 2014 (December 1, 2014)	Kim Woo-bin Lee Hyun-woo	National Museum of Korea (Seobinggo-ro, Yongsan District, Seoul	Black Team (Yoo Jae-suk, Lee Kwang-soo, Kim Woo-bin); Red Team (Gary, Haha, Jee Seok-jin); Blue Team (Kim Jong-kook, Song Ji-hyo, Lee Hyun-woo)	Spy Team (Lee Kwang-soo, Kim Woo-bin)	Find the ancient script and eliminate the other members	Kim Woo-bin Wins
226 (Note: Christmas Special.)	December 21, 2014 (November 24, 2014)	Kang Hye-jung Kim Hye-ja Lee Chun-hee	Korea Job World (Bundang District, Seongnam, Gyeonggi Province)	No teams		Complete the mission given by the production staff	Everyone Wins ₩6.18 million was donated to World Vision International under the guests name.
227 (Note: Year-End Special.)	December 28, 2014 (December 22, 2014)	Kang Jung-ho Ryu Hyun-jin	Mokdong Baseball Stadium (Yangcheon District, Mok-dong, Seoul)	No teams		Complete the mission given by the production staff	Everyone Wins; The members and guests gave gifts to students and baseball players of Wondong Middle School.

== Ratings ==
- Ratings listed below are the individual corner ratings of Running Man. (Note: Individual corner ratings do not include commercial time, which regular ratings include.)

Ep. #	Original Airdate	TNmS Ratings		Naver Ratings	
Ep. #	Original Airdate	Nationwide	Seoul Capital Area	Nationwide	Seoul Capital Area
179	January 5, 2014	100%	15.4%	15.1%	16.2%
180	January 12, 2014	12.2%	14.0%	15.1%	17.3%
181	January 19, 2014	12.2%	14.1%	12.3%	13.2%
182	January 26, 2014	14.1%	15.7%	15.5%	17.4%
183	February 2, 2014	13.5%	16.3%	13.8%	15.1%
184	February 9, 2014	12.9%	14.9%	14.9%	16.4%
185	February 16, 2014	12.1%	13.8%	12.6%	13.9%
186	February 23, 2014	11.2%	12.8%	11.6%	12.9%
187	March 2, 2014	9.1%	10.8%	12.9%	15.2%
188	March 9, 2014	11.8%	13.3%	13.0%	14.5%
189	March 16, 2014	9.9%	11.8%	12.8%	14.1%
190	March 23, 2014	11.1%	13.2%	13.6%	15.8%
191	March 30, 2014	9.0%	10.7%	10.4%	12.0%
192	April 6, 2014	12.6%	14.7%	13.6%	15.4%
193	April 13, 2014	10.9%	13.0%	12.0%	13.0%
194	May 4, 2014	9.6%	10.5%	8.7%	9.8%
195	May 11, 2014	11.6%	13.7%	11.2%	12.3%
196	May 18, 2014	9.4%	10.8%	9.6%	10.7%
197	May 25, 2014	11.1%	13.3%	10.7%	11.4%
198	June 1, 2014	12.6%	13.2%	12.1%	13.4%
199	June 8, 2014	13.4%	15.5%	12.8%	13.4%
200	June 15, 2014	11.1%	12.9%	10.9%	12.1%
201	June 22, 2014	10.4%	11.7%	9.5%	10.0%
202	June 29, 2014	11.1%	11.8%	10.9%	11.2%
203	July 6, 2014	10.3%	10.6%	9.0%	9.5%
204	July 13, 2014	9.9%	10.3%	9.2%	9.5%
205	July 20, 2014	10.8%	11.9%	10.1%	10.7%
206	July 27, 2014	9.6%	11.4%	8.6%	9.0%
207	August 3, 2014	9.5%	10.0%	10.0%	10.2%
208	August 10, 2014	9.0%	10.3%	9.1%	9.8%
209	August 17, 2014	10.6%	12.4%	10.5%	11.6%
210	August 24, 2014	9.0%	9.7%	8.5%	9.2%
211	August 31, 2014	9.1%	10.4%	9.2%	10.0%
212	September 7, 2014	5.6%	6.3%	6.2%	6.6%
213	September 21, 2014	6.8%	8.5%	7.2%	8.1%
214	September 28, 2014	7.6	9.7%	7.5%	7.8%
215	October 5, 2014	9.2%	10.0%	10.1%	11.1%
216	October 12, 2014	8.5%	9.8%	8.9%	9.5%
217	October 19, 2014	11.0%	13.0%	12.1%	13.7%
218	October 26, 2014	9.2%	10.3%	9.3%	10.5%
219	November 2, 2014	10.3%	11.7%	10.8%	11.1%
220	November 9, 2014	8.6%	10.2%	9.1%	9.8%
221	November 16, 2014	9.2%	10.4%	9.3%	9.9%
222	November 23, 2014	8.6%	10.6%	9.8%	10.3%
223	November 30, 2014	10.1%	12.2%	10.8%	11.5%
224	December 7, 2014	11.7%	15.2%	12.1%	13.3%
225	December 14, 2014	10.3%	13.0%	11.9%	13.3%
226	December 21, 2014	9.6%	11.5%	10.9%	11.5%
227	December 28, 2014	11.7%	14.5%	12.9%	13.4%
