= National Museum of Science and Technology =

National Museum of Science and Technology may refer to:

- National Museum of Science and Technology (Bangladesh), in Dhaka, Bangladesh
- National Museum of Science and Technology (Pakistan), in Lahore, Pakistan
- National Museum of Science and Technology (Spain), in La Coruña and Alcobendas, Spain
- National Museum of Science and Technology (Sweden), in Stockholm, Sweden
- Ingenium, official name National Museum of Science and Technology, a Canadian crown corporation that operates several museums, including:
  - Canada Science and Technology Museum, formerly the National Museum of Science and Technology

== See also ==
- National Museum of Science (disambiguation)
- National Science and Technology Museum, in Taiwan
