= National Museum of Science =

National Museum of Science may refer to

- Science Museum, London
- National Museum of Nature and Science, Tokyo, Japan
- National Science Museum, South Korea
- Israel National Museum of Science, Technology, and Space

== See also ==
- National Museum of Science and Technology (disambiguation)
