= Alkkagi =

Board game

Alkkagi board and stones

Alkkagi (알까기) is a game between two players where several stones are placed on a board and the player flicks them with his finger to knock the opponent's stones off the board. A variant of Alkkagi appears in Chinese literature as Tanqi (彈棋 or 彈棊), which was played by emperors from the Han to the Tang dynasties. In Korea it was played in Goryeo. Thus it is an ancient game.

Comedian Choi Yang-rak broadcast a game of Alkkagi against celebrities on Comedy.com, which made it popular, and competitions for the general public have also been held.

== How to play ==
1. First, the two participants place the same number of stones on their side of board, with one player taking black stones, and the other taking white. (The number of stones usually used is 5 or 7.)
2. They take turns attacking each other.
3. On taking a turn, a player chooses one of his stones and flicks it in any direction with his finger, in an attempt to make one of his opponent's stones fall off the board.
4. Stones that have fallen from the board may not be used.
5. The game ends when all of one person's stones have fallen off the board, making the winner the person with stones remaining.

The goal of the game is for the participants to flick their stones to knock the opponent's stones off the board. Depending on the strength and direction of a flick, it is possible to push away two or more stones at once (iltaipi), or not be able to push away any stones, or instead, the flicker's stones may fall off. (On TV, this is called "kkwak"; in the past, it was called suicide.) There are also cases where both players' stones fall off together (mutual suicide or self-destruction, non-gaetabeop). During the game, there are cases where one player's stones get stuck next to the opponent's stones, which in Alkkagi is called "tteok (떡)".

=== Alkkagi terms ===
- Kkwak (꽥) (suicide): When one's own stone falls off the board.
- One hit gain (일타이득): Pushing away multiple opponent's stones at once with one of your stones.
- Non-gae-ta-beop (논개타법) (suicide by oneself, self-destruction): When your stone and your opponent's stone fall off together.
- Rice cake (떡): When your stone is next to your opponent's stone.

=== Alkkagi rule variations ===
- Jup-al-kka-gi (접알까기): This is a game method mainly used in gender duels, and usually starts by giving two more stones to the female player.
- Matching Stones (맞알까기): This is the most common method of playing the game, with each player starting with the same number of stones.

== Board and stones ==
Baduk board and stones are usually used for this game. However, instead of using a Baduk (Go) board and stones, the game can also be played using a Janggi board and Janggi stones. When played this way, the game is called Janggi-alkkagi

Baduk stones are round and double convex (shaped like a double convex lens), while the Janggi stones are octagonal, so when Janggi stones collide with other Janggi stones, their trajectories change. Also, since there are three sizes of the Janggi stones, many more strategies are possible. In the case of a foldable Baduk board with a Janggi board on the back, the hinge also acts as a variable in the game.

== Popular culture ==
In the TV series, In the Soop: Friendcation, Episode 1, Seojun, V and Peakboy play alkkagi. The player who goes first is chosen by Rock, Paper, Scissors, and in a final game, Peakboy and V start with just 3 stones.

Other instances of Alkkagi in TV shows are:

- My Little Television V2
- 2 days & 1 night. See List of 2 Days & 1 Night episodes
- Running Man. see List of Running Man episodes (2014)
- Going Seventeen
