= Expo Science Park =

Science park in Yuseong-gu, South Korea

Coordinates: 36.377°N 127.385°E

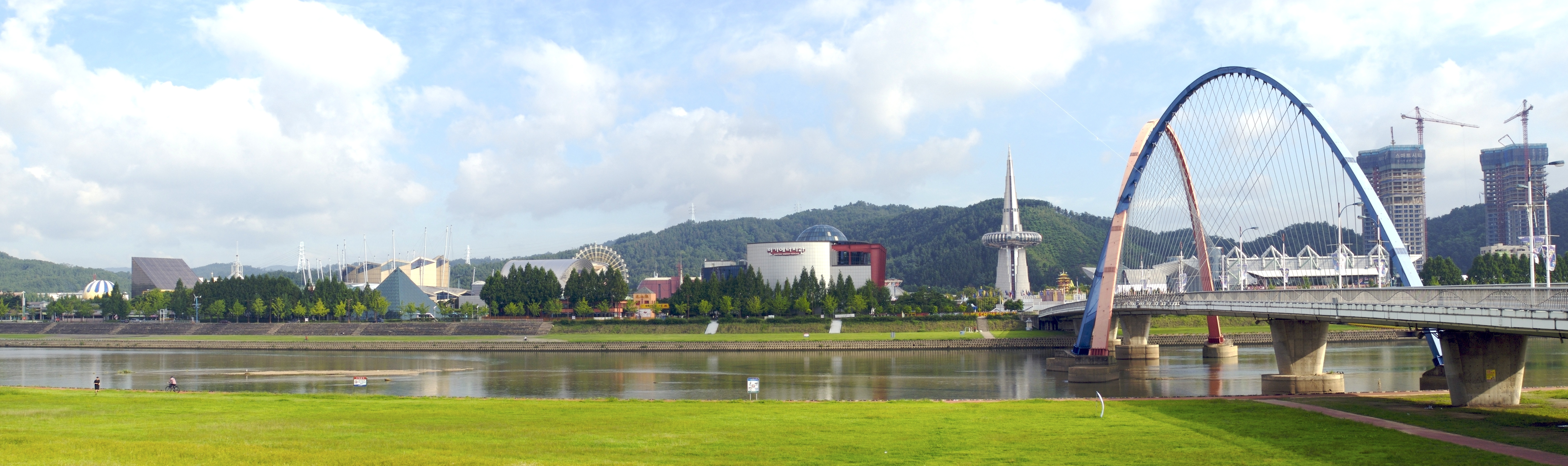
- Expo Science Park in 2007
- Location: Yuseong District, Daejeon, South Korea

- Expo Science Park
- Hangul: 엑스포과학공원
- Revised Romanization: Ekseupogwahakgongwon
- McCune–Reischauer: Eksŭp'ogwahakkongwŏn

Expo Science Park (Korean: 엑스포과학공원) is a science park in Yuseong District, Daejeon, South Korea, built for Taejŏn Expo '93. Facilities at Expo Park included a garden, amusement park, and observation tower. While the tower and some buildings remain, most of the expo buildings have now been removed. The Daejeon Convention Center became the first convention center in the city in 2008 and opened their second building in 2022.

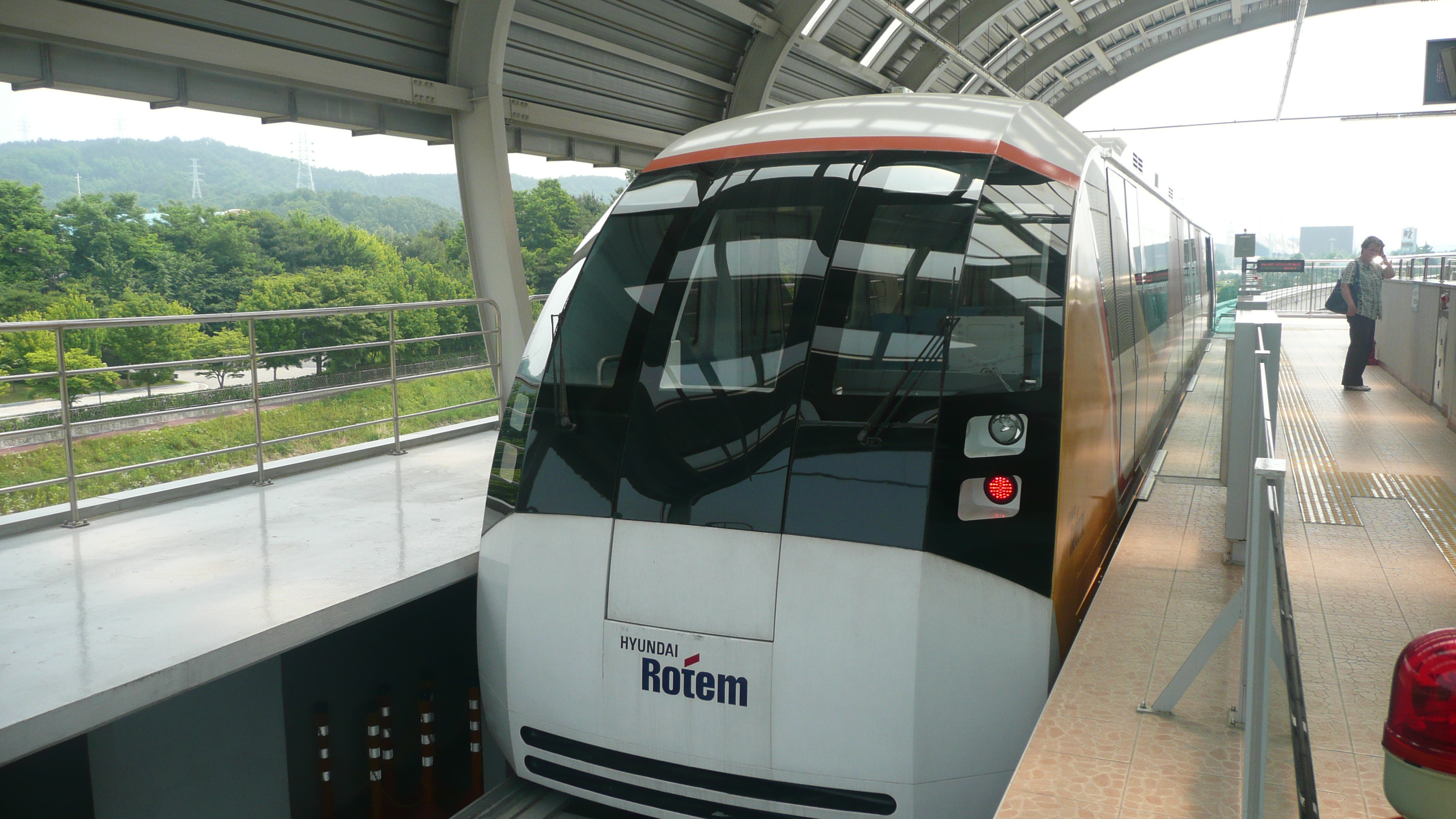
MAGLEV UTM-02

In September 2014, the Ministry of Science, ICT and Future Planning announced that Expo Science Park would be demolished in stages from November 2014 to August 2015. However, in recognition of their historic value, Hanbit Tower, the international conference room, and the simulation pavilion would be kept. In November 2014, the Shinsegae consortium won a bid to build the science complex within the park.

In September 2017, Studio Cube, a state-run film studio complex on the site of the park, formally opened its doors to film and drama production.

As of 2018, the site is hosting the headquarters complex for the Institute for Basic Science.

In August 2021, the 2nd Expo Bridge, connecting the park with Seo-gu, opened.
