= Gwacheon National Science Museum =

Museum in Gwacheon, South Korea

Coordinates: 37.4388°N 127.0047°E

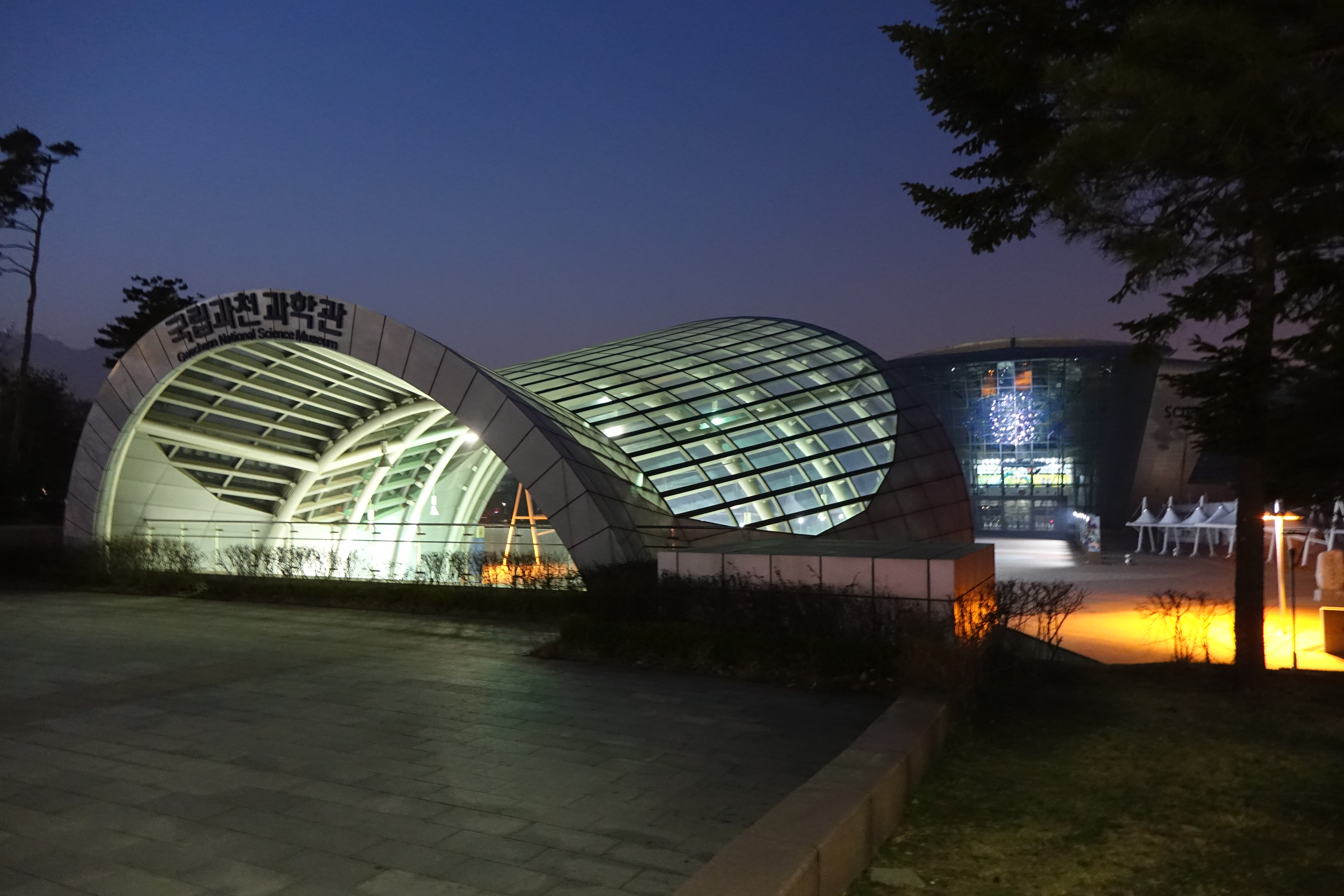

Korean name
- Hangul: 국립과천과학관
- Hanja: 國立果川科學館
- RR: Gungnip Gwacheon gwahakgwan
- MR: Kungnip Kwach'ŏn kwahakkwan

Gwacheon National Science Museum (Korean: 국립과천과학관) is a national museum in Gwacheon, South Korea. It opened in 2008.

== Hall of Fame ==
=== Main exhibitions ===
The hall of fame is a place to praise the achievements of the scientists who contributed to the development of science and technology, and to look around at how Korea has developed and what Korea has achieved. It is dedicated to 31 honorable scientists such as Jang Yeong-sil, Heo Jun, Benjamin Whisoh Lee, and Seok Joo-myung. It consists of 35 exhibits, including 2 experimental exhibits such as “I am also an honorable scientist.” The achievements of the scientists are told in a storytelling way.

=== Honorable scientists from the old days, meet the brilliant past ===
Like the invention of gunpowder weapons of Moo-seon Choi or what the famous Joseon engineer Young-shil Jang had done, the brilliant achievements of the main figures who led the science and technology powerhouse in the 14th to 15th centuries can be seen here. The successes and relics of the scientists who led Korean science and technology during the Renaissance, such as Joon Heo and Dae-yong Hong, can also be seen here.

=== Honorable contemporary scientists, overcome the pains ===
Here, scientists who contributed to Korea's rise to one of the 10 top science and technology developed countries and its recovery from the pains of Japanese colonization and the Korean War are honored. The stories are classified into “Pioneers of Science and Technology,” “Constructing the Footholds of Science and Technology,” “Researches that expanded the Horizon of Knowledge,” and “Researches that changed the lives of Koreans.”

=== Digital archive, reviewing at once ===
“Korea’s glorious history of science” is an archive table that shows the positions and achievements of honorable scientists in chronological order, starting from the 14th century.

=== I am also an Honorable Scientist, dreaming of becoming a scientist ===
It is a photo zone where visitors can exhibit what they want to achieve with reliefs of their faces.

== Nobel Prize and Me ==
=== Main exhibitions ===
Visitors can experience the achievements of Nobel prize winners, especially those that are relevant in real life. 31 displays in 5 corners form the shape of a house. Some examples are ‘Nobel car race’ and ‘DNA rolling ball.’

=== Nobel prize hero, meet the saviors of the human race ===
In the “Nobel prize hero” corner, scientists who changed people’s lives dramatically, such as Marie Curie, James Watson, who found out the structure of DNA, and Fleming, who found penicillin, are honored.

=== Nobel prize winners in Physiology or Medicine in the library ===
“Nobel prize winners in Physiology or Medicine change the view of life,” tells how research like discovering vaccines, developing artificial vitamins, and in vitro fertilization have helped people to be healthy. “DNA rolling ball” is an experimental exhibit that shows how the gene synthesis, which produces fluorescent fish and blue roses, works.

=== Nobel Prize Winners in Physics in the Living Room ===
“Nobel Prize winners in Physics uncover the origin of space,” explains how these laureates determined that the universe is approximately 13.8 billion years old. There is also a model of a large particle accelerator that illustrates how scientists have attempted to discover the smallest particles.

“Nobel Prize winners in Physics enhance human capabilities” describes how inventions such as television, digital cameras, telephones, navigation systems, and computers emerged as a result of their work.

=== Nobel prize winners in Chemistry in the kitchen ===
“Nobel prize winners in nature” shows the achievement of winners in chemistry like detergents, frying pans, plastic products, artificial dye and spices, and fermented foods. “Nobel prize winners in vehicle” shows the contribution of the winners to vehicles with VR racing games.

== Images ==
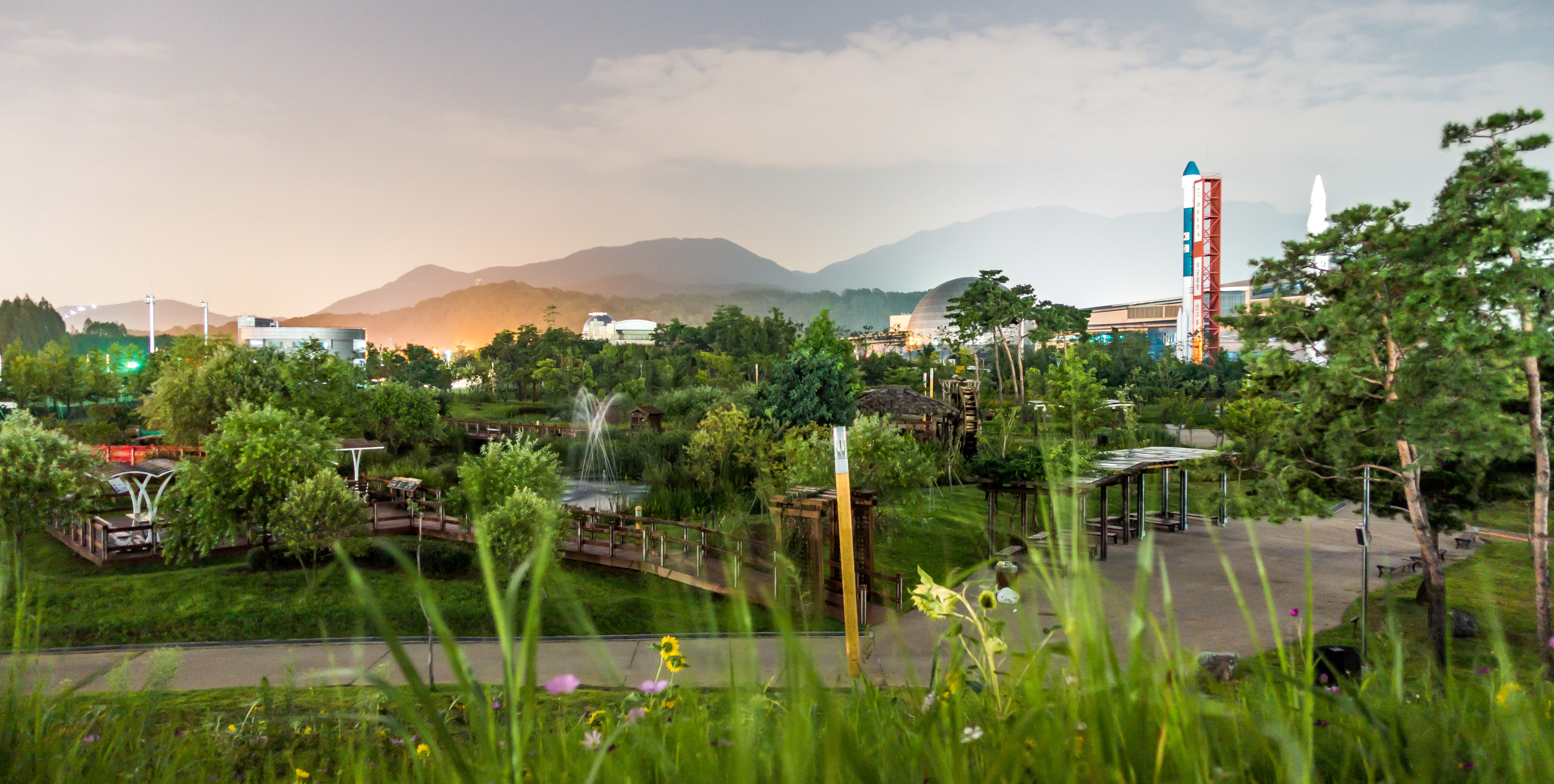
Gwacheon National Science Museum Garden

== See also ==
- National Science Museum, South Korea
- List of museums in South Korea
