= National Science Museum, South Korea =

Coordinates: 36.376151°N 127.3749955°E

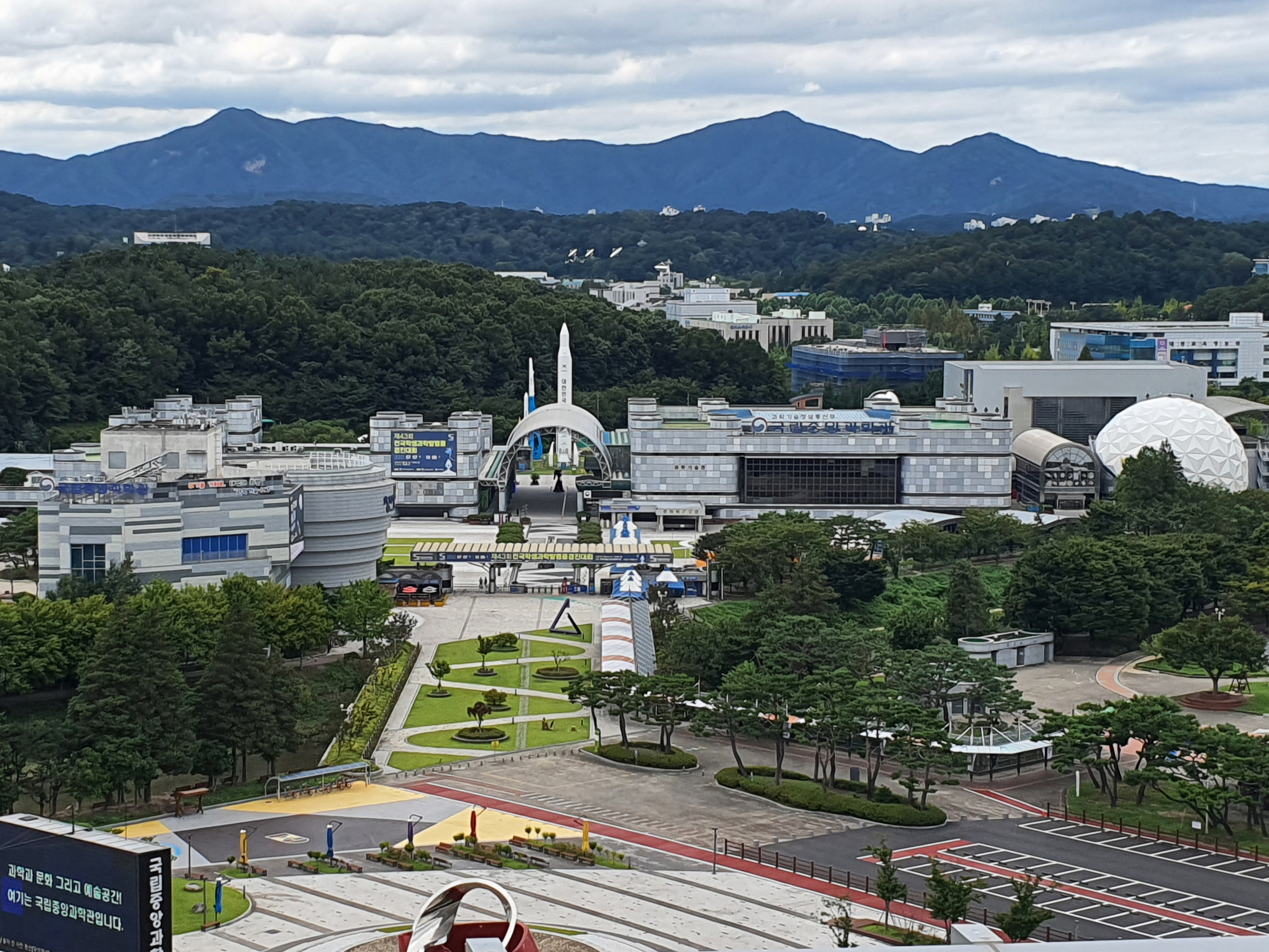

Korean name
- Hangul: 국립중앙과학관
- Hanja: 國立中央科學館
- RR: Gungnip jungang gwahakgwan
- MR: Kungnip chungang kwahakkwan

The National Science Museum is a national science museum in Daejeon, South Korea.

== History ==
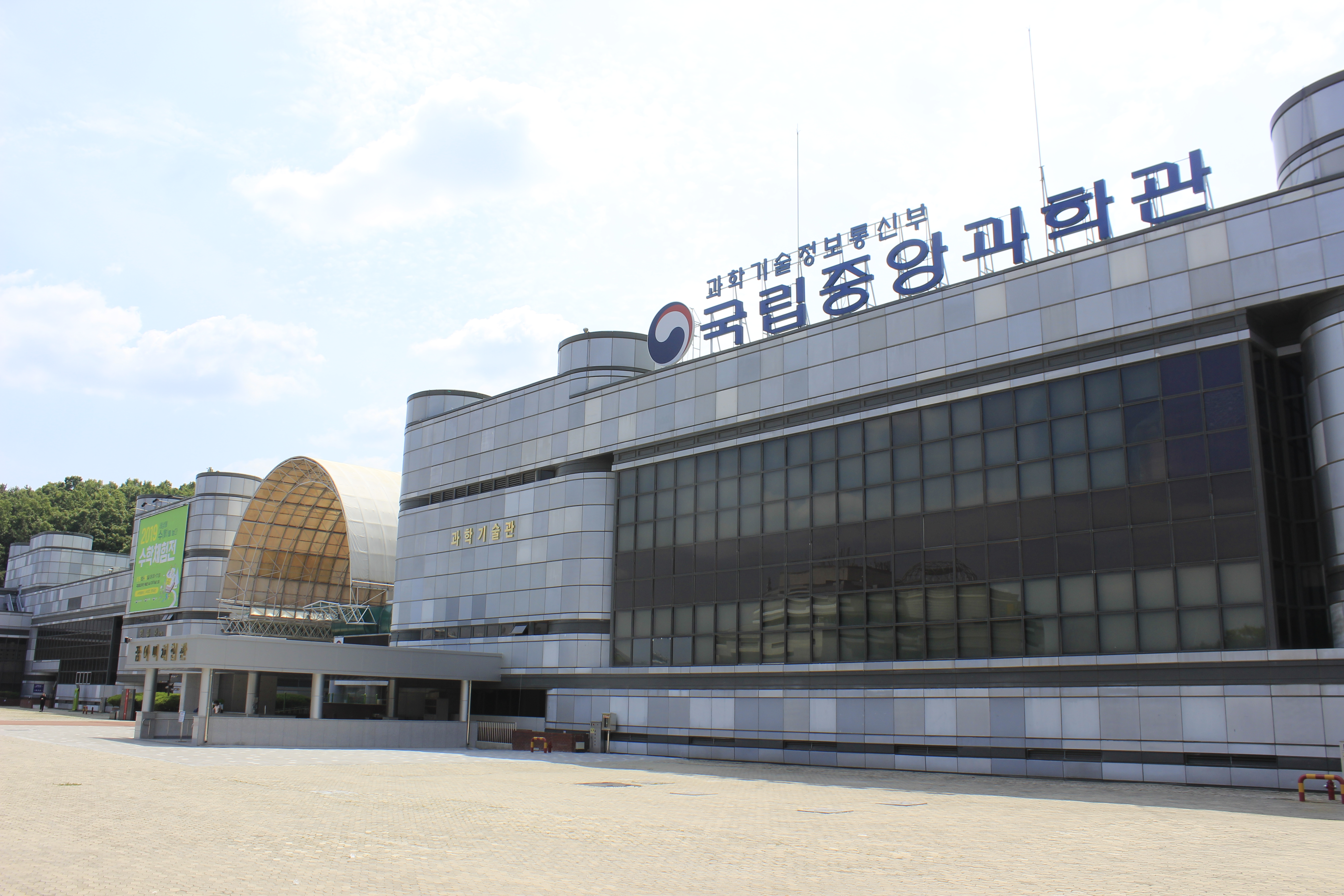
Entrance to the National Science Museum

It opened in Seoul in 1926 and became a national museum in 1949. It relocated in 1990 near Expo Park. It welcomed 1,795,076 visitors in 2017.

The National Science Museum was established in Seoul, Jung-Gu, Yejang-Dong in 1945 to promote scientific development in everyday life and to encourage scientific creativity amongst youth.

In 1983, the expansion and relocation of the Science Museum took place at Daejeon's Daedeok Science Complex. The compound was to have total space of 176,232 m^{2} and the interior space of 43,384 m^{2}. After 5 years of construction, the building opened on 9 October 1990.

== Exhibition ==
- Science & Technology Hall
- Future Tech
- Natural History Hall
- Science Alive Discovery Center
- KkumAty Hall
- Human Evolution Hall
- Outdoor Exhibits
- Planetarium
- Botanical Garden
- Astronomical Observatory
- Children's Science Museum

== See also ==
- Gwacheon National Science Museum
- List of museums in South Korea
- Daejeon Convention Center
- National Science Museum Maglev
