= Polyvalent DNA gold nanoparticles =

Polyvalent DNA gold nanoparticles, now more commonly referred to as spherical nucleic acids, (Fig. 1) are colloidal gold particles densely modified with short (typically ~30-mer or less), highly oriented, synthetic DNA strands. They were invented by Chad Mirkin et al. at Northwestern University in 1996. Paul Alivisatos et al. at the University of California, Berkeley introduced a related monovalent structure the same year. Due to the strong interaction between gold and thiols (-SH), the first polyvalent DNA gold nanoparticles were obtained by capping the gold nanoparticles with a dense monolayer of thiol-modified DNA. The dense packing and negative charge of the phosphate backbones of DNA orients it into solution (like a “koosh ball”) with a footprint that is dependent on factors including the particle size and radius of curvature.

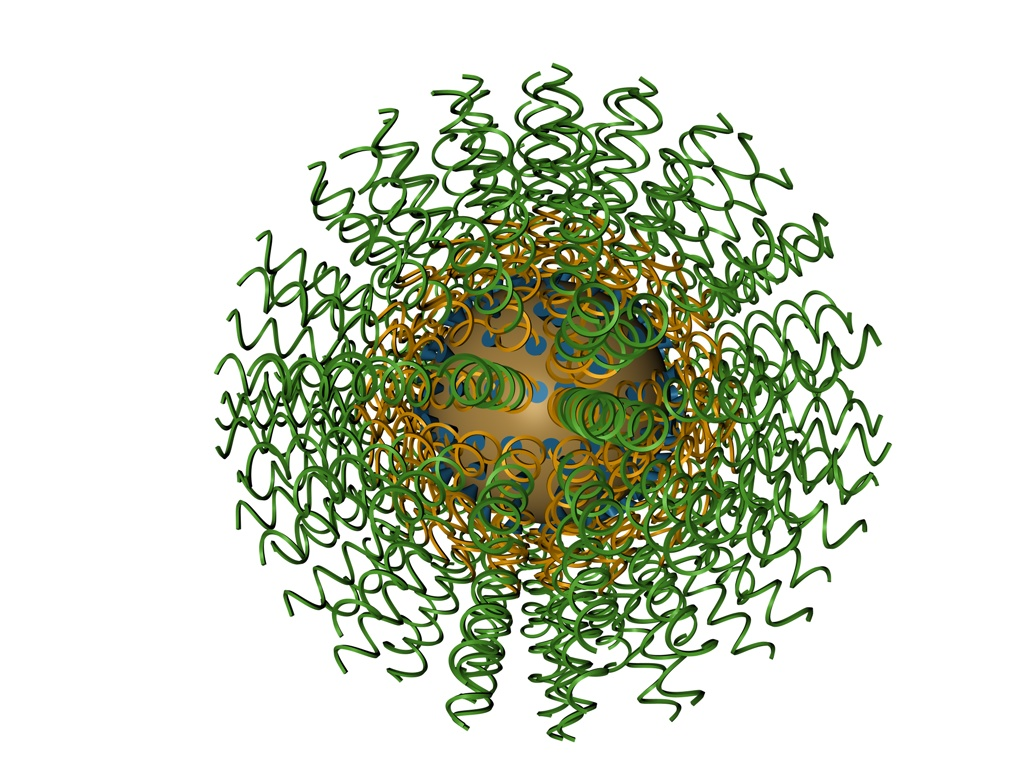
Figure 1. Schematic of a polyvalent DNA gold nanoparticle.

== Properties and Applications ==
The three-dimensional structure of the DNA shell imparts upon these conjugates novel chemical, physical, and biological properties that are not associated with the same sequences of linear DNA free in solution. For example, SNA-gold nanoparticle conjugates have been shown to exhibit increased uptake into cells compared to their linear counterparts. Furthermore, when hybridized to a nucleic acid “reporter” strand containing a fluorophore probe, these polyvalent nanoparticles can be used as intracellular probes to detect specific mRNA sequences within single living cells.

Polyvalent DNA gold nanoparticles have also spurred significant advances in the field of materials science and engineering. When one set of polyvalent DNA gold nanoparticles is combined with another that is functionalized with complementary DNA sequences, the particles assemble via DNA hybridization interactions. These nanoparticles can be used to prepare a wide range of colloidal crystals with sub-nanometer level precision (Fig. 2). Polyvalent DNA gold nanoparticles also form the basis for a new field of chemistry where a particle can be viewed as an “atom” and the DNA as “bonds” to make higher-order materials.

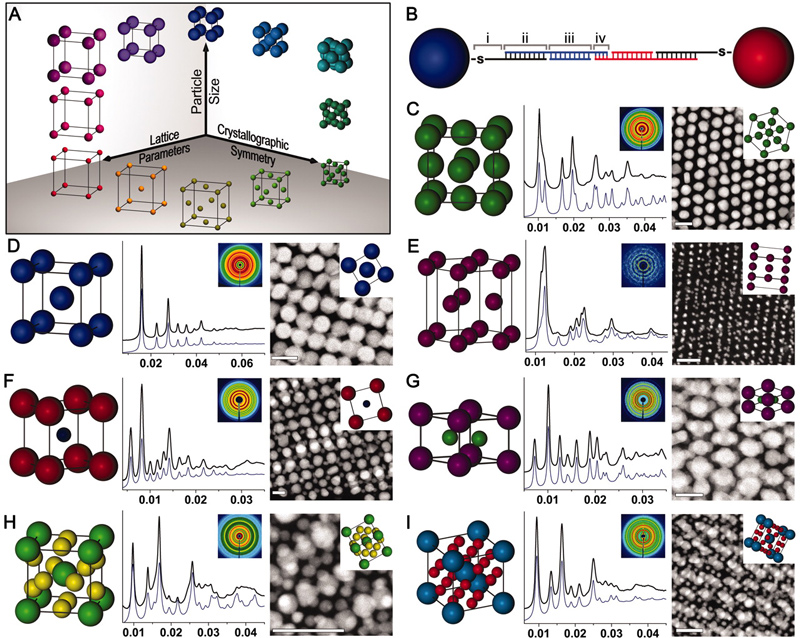
Figure 2. Examples of nanoparticle superlattices that can be synthesized based on SNA-nanoparticle conjugates. Different structures can be accessed in part by changing the properties of the DNA shell. The structures (left) are verified using small angle X-ray scattering (middle) and electron microscopy (right).

Due to cooperative effects stemming from polyvalency (chemistry), a polyvalent SNA-nanoparticle conjugate binds tighter to a complementary free linear strand than does the same sequence of DNA free in solution. This finding has paved the way to the development of various detection methodologies based on this class of nanoparticles.

== Synthesis and Functionalization ==
Gold nanoparticles can be purchased or synthesized via a variety of methods. Several strategies exist for functionalizing gold nanoparticles with single-stranded DNA; one of the most commonly utilized strategies involves introducing thiol-terminated DNA to a solution of gold nanoparticles and gradually increasing the concentration of a salt, like NaCl. The addition of NaCl reduces repulsive forces between like-charged DNA strands (negative) so that they pack densely on nanoparticle surfaces. A typical procedure for preparing polyvalent DNA gold nanoparticles is outlined briefly below:

1. Reduce dithiol moieties by adding 0.1 M dithiothreitol (DTT) in 0.18 M phosphate buffer (PB) (pH=8) to lyophilized thiolated DNA and letting the solution sit for at least 1 hour.
2. Purify the DNA using a NAP-5 column.
3. Add the purified DNA to the gold nanoparticles at a concentration of 1 OD/mL.
4. Bring the concentration of sodium dodecyl sulfate (SDS) and PB to final concentrations of 0.01% and 0.01 M, respectively.
5. After 20 minutes, bring the concentration of NaCl to 0.05 M using a 2 M NaCl/0.01 M PB stock solution while maintaining 0.01% SDS. Incubate for 20 minutes.
6. Repeat step 5 to increase the concentration of NaCl by 0.05 M.
7. Increase the NaCl concentration at increments of 0.1 M until a final concentration of 1 M is reached using 20-minute incubation periods.
8. Incubate overnight.
9. Centrifuge the gold nanoparticle solution (the functionalized particles will collect at the bottom of the reaction vessel), remove the supernatant, and resuspend the particles in a 0.1% SDS solution.
10. Repeat step 9 four times to complete the purification of the functionalized particles from any excess free DNA in solution.
