= Nathan C. Gianneschi =

American chemist and biomedical engineer

Nathan Claude Gianneschi
- Education: University of Adelaide B.Sc. (1999); Northwestern University Ph.D. (2005)
- Awards: Presidential Early Career Award for Scientists and Engineers, NIH Director’s New Innovator Award, NIH Director’s Transformative Research Award
- Scientific career
- Fields: Chemistry, Biomedical Engineering, and Materials Science
- Workplaces: Northwestern University (2017–present) University of California San Diego (2008–2017) Scripps Research Institute (2005–2008)
- Thesis: Supramolecular allosteric catalysts (2005)
- Doctoral advisor: Chad Mirkin, SonBinh Nguyen
- Other academic advisors: Louis Rendina, Mohammadreza Ghadiri
- Website: sites.northwestern.edu/gianneschigroup/

Nathan C. Gianneschi is an Australian scientist and academic based in the United States. As of January 2026 he is the Jacob & Rosaline Cohn Professor of Chemistry at Northwestern University in Evanston, Illinois.

== Early life and education ==
Gianneschi graduated with a B.Sc. (Honours) in chemistry from the University of Adelaide in 1999. During his undergraduate, he conducted honors research with Dr. Louis Rendina on the synthesis of hydrogen-bonded platinum-containing macrocycles. Following this, he moved to Evanston, Illinois to pursue graduate studies at Northwestern University with Prof. Chad Mirkin and Prof. SonBinh Nguyen. There, he developed supramolecular catalysts that exhibit allosteric behavior, that is, exhibit increased reactivity when the catalyst molecule is modified at a site distinct from the catalyst site.

Gianneschi graduated in 2005 with his Ph.D. From 2005 to 2008, he was a Dow Foundation Fellow (through the American Australian Association) at The Scripps Research Institute with M. Reza Ghadiri, where he worked on a strategy to modulate natural enzymes into programmable complexes that can perform simple logic operations.

== Career ==
Gianneschi began his independent career as an assistant professor at the University of California, San Diego in 2008. He was promoted to associate professor in 2014, and full professor in 2016. He was appointed the Teddy Traylor Faculty Scholar and Professor of Chemistry and Biochemistry, Materials Science and Engineering and NanoEngineering.

In 2017, he moved to Northwestern University.

As of January 2026 he is the Jacob & Rosaline Cohn Professor of Chemistry, Materials Science & Engineering, and Biomedical Engineering at Northwestern University. He is or has also been the associate director for the International Institute for Nanotechnology. Gianneschi's lab takes an interdisciplinary approach to nanomaterials research, with a focus on multifunctional materials for biomedical applications, programmed interactions with biomolecules and cells, and basic research into nanoscale materials design, synthesis and characterization.

== Recognition and awards ==
Gianneschi is a Sloan Research Fellow, a Fellow of the Royal Society of Chemistry, and a Fellow of the American Institute for Medical and Biological Engineering.

In 2010 he received the Presidential Early Career Award for Scientists and Engineers.
