= Spherical nucleic acid =

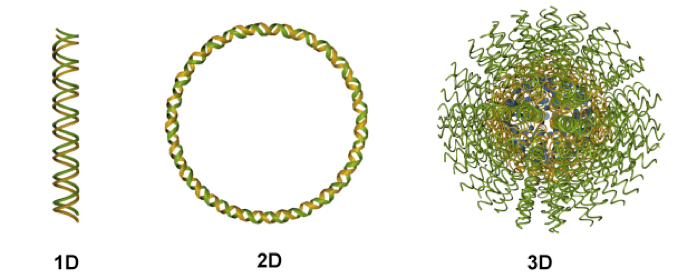
Figure 1. Three important classes of nucleic acids: one-dimensional linear, two-dimensional circular, and three-dimensional spherical.

Spherical nucleic acids (SNAs) are nanostructures that consist of a densely packed, highly oriented arrangement of linear nucleic acids in a three-dimensional, spherical geometry. This novel three-dimensional architecture is responsible for many of the SNA's novel chemical, biological, and physical properties that make it useful in biomedicine and materials synthesis. SNAs were first introduced in 1996 by Chad Mirkin's group at Northwestern University.

== Structure and function ==
The SNA structure typically consists of two components: a nanoparticle core and a nucleic acid shell. The nucleic acid shell is made up of short, synthetic oligonucleotides terminated with a functional group that can be utilized to attach them to the nanoparticle core. The dense loading of nucleic acids on the particle surface results in a characteristic radial orientation around the nanoparticle core, which minimizes repulsion between the negatively charged oligonucleotides.

The first SNA consisted of a gold nanoparticle core with a dense shell of 3' alkanethiol-terminated DNA strands. Repeated additions of salt counterions were used to reduce the electrostatic repulsion between DNA strands and enable more efficient DNA packing on the nanoparticle surface. Since then, silver, iron oxide, silica, and semiconductor materials have also been used as inorganic cores for SNAs. Other core materials with increased biocompatibility, such FDA-approved PLGA polymer nanoparticles, micelles, liposomes, and proteins have also been used to prepare SNAs. Single-stranded and double-stranded versions of these materials have been created using, for example, DNA, LNA, and RNA.

One- and two-dimensional forms of nucleic acids (e.g., single strands, linear duplexes, and plasmids) (Fig. 1) are important biological machinery for the storage and transmission of genetic information. The specificity of DNA interactions through Watson–Crick base pairing provides the foundation for these functions. Scientists and engineers have been synthesising and, in certain cases, mass-producing nucleic acids for decades to understand and exploit this elegant chemical recognition motif. The recognition abilities of nucleic acids can be enhanced when arranged in a spherical geometry, which allows for polyvalent interactions to occur. This polyvalency, in this context, polyvalency refers to the presentation of many nucleic acid strands on a single spherical scaffold, allowing multiple binding interactions to occur simultaneously; along with the high density and degree of orientation described above, helps explain why SNAs exhibit different properties than their lower-dimensional constituents (Fig. 2).

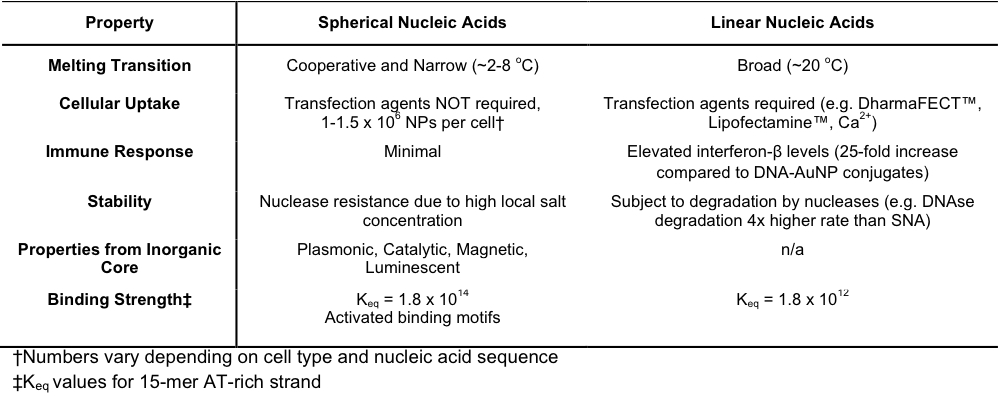
Figure 2. Properties of spherical nucleic acids (SNAs) versus linear nucleic acids.

Over two decades of research has revealed that the properties of a SNA conjugate are a synergistic combination of those of the core and the shell. The core serves two purposes: 1) it imparts upon the conjugate novel physical and chemical properties (e.g., plasmonic, catalytic, magnetic, luminescent), and 2) it acts as a scaffold for the assembly and orientation of the nucleic acids. The nucleic acid shell imparts chemical and biological recognition abilities that include a greater binding strength, cooperative melting behavior, higher stability, and enhanced cellular uptake without the use of transfection agents (compared to the same sequence of linear DNA). It has been shown that one can crosslink the DNA strands at their base, and subsequently dissolve the inorganic core with KCN or I_{2} to create a core-less (hollow) form of SNA (Fig. 3, right), which exhibits many of the same properties as the original polyvalent DNA gold nanoparticle conjugate (Fig. 3, left).

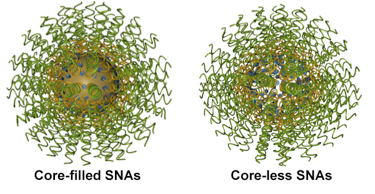
Figure 3. Gold nanoparticle filled and core-less spherical nucleic acid structures (SNAs).

Due to their structure and function, SNAs occupy a materials space distinct from DNA nanotechnology and DNA origami, (although both are important to the field of nucleic acid–guided programmable materials. With DNA origami, such structures are synthesized via DNA hybridization events. In contrast, the SNA structure can be synthesized independent of nucleic acid sequence and hybridization, instead their synthesis relies upon chemical bond formation between nanoparticles and DNA ligands. Furthermore, DNA origami uses DNA hybridization interactions to realize a final structure, whereas SNAs and other forms of three-dimensional nucleic acids (anisotropic structures templated with triangular prism, rod, octahedra, or rhombic dodecadhedra-shaped nanoparticles) utilize the nanoparticle core to arrange the linear nucleic acid components into functional forms. It is the particle core that dictates the shape of the SNA. SNAs should also not be confused with their monovalent analogues – individual particles coupled to a single DNA strand. Such single strand-nanoparticle conjugate structures have led to interesting advances in their own right, but do not exhibit the unique properties of SNAs.

== Proposed applications ==
=== Intracellular gene regulation ===
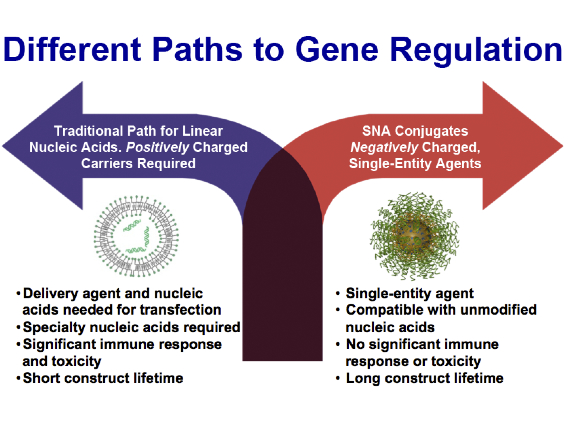
Figure 4. Nucleic acids arranged in a spherical geometry offer a fundamentally new path toward gene regulation. Benefits to this approach include the ability to enter cells without precomplexation with transfection agents, nuclease resistance, and minimal immune response.

SNAs are being proposed as therapeutic materials. Despite their high negative charge, they are taken up by cells (also negatively charged) in high quantities without the need for positively charged co-carriers, and they are effective as gene regulation agents in both antisense and RNAi pathways (Fig. 4). The proposed mechanism is that, unlike their linear counterparts, SNAs have the ability to complex scavenger receptor proteins to facilitate endocytosis. However, it does not escape the endosomes, greatly limiting its capability.

SNAs were shown to deliver small interfering RNA (siRNA) to treat glioblastoma multiforme in a proof-of-concept study using a mouse model. The SNAs target Bcl2Like12, a gene overexpressed in glioblastoma tumors, and silences the oncogene. The SNAs injected intravenously cross the blood–brain barrier and find their target in the brain. In the animal model, the treatment resulted in a 20% increase in survival rate and 3 to 4-fold reduction in tumor size. This SNA-based therapeutic approach establishes a platform for treating a wide range of diseases with a genetic basis via digital drug design (where a new drug is made by changing the sequence of nucleic acid on a SNA).

=== Immunotherapy agents ===
SNA properties, such as enhanced cellular uptake, multivalent binding, and endosomal delivery, are desirable for the delivery of immunomodulatory nucleic acids. In particular, SNAs have been used deliver nucleic acids that agonize or antagonize toll-like receptors (proteins involved in innate immune signaling). The use of immunostimulatory SNAs has been shown to result in an 80-fold increase in potency, 700-fold higher antibody titers, 400-fold higher cellular responses to a model antigen, and improved treatment of mice with lymphomas compared to free oligonucleotides (not in SNA form). SNAs have also been used by Mirkin to introduce the concept of "rational vaccinology," that the chemical structure of an immunotherapy, as opposed to just the components alone, dictates its efficacy. This concept has put a new structural focus on engineering vaccines for a wide range of diseases. This finding opens the possibility that, with previous treatments, researchers had the right components in the wrong structural arrangement – a particularly important lesson, especially in the context of COVID-19.

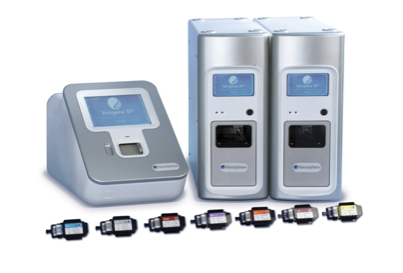
Figure 5. The FDA-cleared Verigene system, originally developed and commercialized by Nanosphere, Inc., a company spun-out of research projects initiated in Mirkin's laboratory at Northwestern University. This system is now sold by Luminex, which acquired Nanosphere in 2016.

=== Intracellular probes ===
NanoFlares utilize the SNA architecture for intracellular mRNA detection. In this design, alkanethiol-terminated antisense DNA strands (complementary to a target mRNA strand within cells) are attached to the surface of a gold nanoparticle. Fluorophore-labeled "reporter strands" are then hybridized to the SNA construct to form the NanoFlare. When the fluorophore labels are brought in close proximity of the gold surface, as controlled by programmable nucleic acid hybridization, their fluorescence is quenched (Fig. 6). After the cellular uptake of NanoFlares, the reporter strands can dehybridize from the NanoFlare when they are replaced by a longer, target mRNA sequence. Note that mRNA binding is thermodynamically favored since the strands holding the reporter sequence have greater overlap of their nucleotide sequence with the target mRNA. Upon reporter strand release, the dye fluorescence is no longer quenched by the gold nanoparticle core and increased fluorescence is observed. This method for RNA detection provides the only way to sort live cells based upon genetic content.

One publication questions the correlation between fluorescence intensities of SmartFlare probes and the levels of corresponding RNAs assessed by RT-qPCR. Another paper has discussed SmartFlare applicability in early equine conceptuses, equine dermal fibroblast cells, and trophoblastic vesicles, finding that SmartFlares may only be applicable for certain uses. Aptamer nanoflares have also been developed to bind to molecular targets other than intracellular mRNA. Aptamers, or oligonucleotide sequences that bind targets with high specificity and sensitivity, were first combined with the NanoFlare architecture in 2009. The arrangement of aptamers in an SNA geometry resulted in increased cellular uptake and detection of physiologically relevant changes in adenosine triphosphate (ATP) levels.

=== Materials synthesis ===
SNAs have been utilized to develop an entire new field of materials science – one that focuses on using SNAs as synthetically programmable building blocks for the construction of colloidal crystals (Fig. 7). In 2011, a landmark paper was published in Science that defines a set of design rules for making superlattice structures of tailorable crystallographic symmetry and lattice parameters with sub-nm precision. The complementary contact model (CCM) proposed in this work can be used to predict the thermodynamically favorable structure, which will maximize the number of hybridized DNA strands (contacts) between nanoparticles.

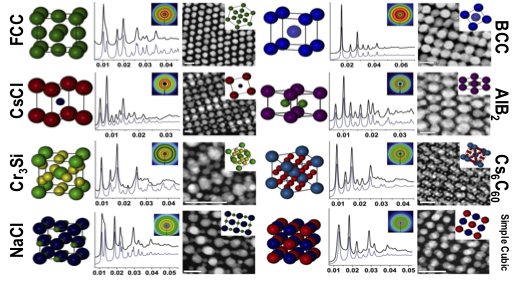
Figure 7. Examples of the types of crystal structures that can be formed using design rules for preparing colloidal crystals. Note that the unit cell schematic, small angle x-ray scattering (SAXS) and electron microscopy data are shown for each example.

Design rules for colloidal crystals engineered with DNA are analogous to Pauling's Rules for ionic crystals, but ultimately more powerful. For example, when using atomic or ionic building blocks in the construction of materials, the crystal structure, symmetry, and spacing are fixed by atomic radii and electronegativity. However, in the nanoparticle-based system, crystal structure can be tuned independent of the nanoparticle size and composition by simply adjusting the length and sequence of the attached DNA. As a result, nanoparticle building blocks with the SNA geometry are often referred to as "programmable atom equivalents" (PAEs). This strategy has enabled the construction of novel crystal structures for several materials systems and even crystal structures with no mineral equivalents. To date, over 50 different crystal symmetries have been achieved using colloidal crystal engineering with DNA.

Lessons from atomic crystallization on macroscale structural features like crystal habit also translate to colloidal crystal engineering with DNA. The Wulff construction bound by the lowest surface energy facets can be achieved for certain nanoparticle symmetries by using a slow cooling crystallization method. This concept was first demonstrated with a body-centered cubic symmetry, where the densest-packed planes were exposed on the surface resulting in a rhombic dodecahedron crystal habit. Other habits such as octrahedra, cubes, or hexagonal prisms have been realized using anisotropic nanoparticles or non-cubic unit cells. Colloidal crystals have also been grown through heterogeneous growth on DNA-functionalized substrates, where lithography can be used to define templates or specific crystal orientations.

Introducing anisotropy to the underlying nanoparticle core has also expanded the scope of structures that can be programmed using DNA. When shorter DNA designs are used with anisotropic nanoparticle cores, directional bonding interactions between DNA on particle facets can drive the formation of specific lattice symmetries and crystal habits. Localizing DNA to specific parts of a particle building block can also be achieved using biological cores, such as proteins with chemically anisotropic surfaces. Directional interactions and valency have been used to direct the formation of new lattice symmetries with protein cores that are difficult to access with inorganic particles. DNA origami frameworks borrowed from the structural DNA nanotechnology community have also been applied as cages for inorganic nanoparticle cores to impart valency and direct the formation of new lattice symmetries.

Colloidal crystals engineered using DNA often form crystal structures similar to ionic compounds, but a new method to access colloidal crystals with metallic-like bonding was recently reported in Science. Particle analogs of electrons in colloidal crystals can be made using gold nanoparticles with greatly reduced size and numbers of attached DNA strands. When combined with typical PAEs, these "electron equivalents" (EEs) roam through the lattice like electrons do in metals. This discovery can be used to access new alloy or intermetallic structures in colloidal crystals.

The ability to place nanoparticles of any composition and shape at any location in a well-defined crystalline lattice with nm-scale precision should have far-reaching implications in areas ranging from catalysis to photonics to energy. Catalytically active and porous materials have been assembled using DNA, and colloidal crystals engineered with DNA can also function as plasmonic photonic crystals with applications in nanoscale optical devices. Chemical stimuli, such as salt concentration, pH, or solvent, and physical stimuli like light have been harnessed to design stimuli-responsive colloidal crystals using DNA-mediated assembly.

== Economic impact ==
The economic impact of SNA technology is substantial. Three companies have been founded that are based on SNA technology – Nanosphere in 2000, AuraSense in 2009, and AuraSense Therapeutics (now Exicure, Inc.) in 2011. Hundreds of millions of dollars have been invested in these companies and they have employed hundreds of people. The SmartFlares were commercialised by Merck Millipore between 2013 and 2018 for the detection of mRNAs in life cells before being withdrawn as they in fact do not detect mRNAs in life cells. Nanosphere was one of the first nanotechnology-based biotechnology firms to go public in late 2007. It burnt through over $412.5 million since inception before being sold for $58M in 2016 to Luminex. The FDA-cleared Verigene system is now sold by Luminex with accompanying FDA-cleared panel assays for bloodstream, respiratory tract, and gastrointestinal tract infections. It is being used for COVID-19 surveillance. Exicure went public in 2018 and is listed on the Nasdaq (XCUR). At the end of 2022, it was on its "death spiral".
