= Parametric thinking =

Parametric thinking is the influence of engaging in a thinking process that links, relates and outputs calculated actions to generate solutions to problems, rather than simply seeking them. It has its origins in the design fields of urban design, architectural design, interior design, industrial and furniture design. The process is associated with parametricism, a style within contemporary avant-garde architecture, promoted as a successor to post-modern architecture and modern architecture.

== History ==
Parametric thinking emerged as a theory-driven design education, project and delivery movement in the early 2010s, with its earliest practitioners harnessing and adapting the then new parametric design software and other advanced computational processes that had been introduced within architecture and related design fields. In the architecture education context in 2011, professors of the schools of architecture David Karle and Brian Kelly of University of Nebraska–Lincoln published advocacy for a paradigm shift in design education.

Karle and Kelly also highlighted that "digital tools are currently being used in design schools across the country. This paradigm in both education and practice of architecture is continually changing the profession, from the way in which design is conceived, represented, documented, and fabricated. Parametric design can be defined as a series of questions to establish the variables of a design and a computational definition that can be used to facilitate a variety of solutions. Parametric thinking is a way of relating tangible and intangible systems into a design proposal removed from digital tool specificity and establishes relationships between properties within a system. It asks architects to start with the design parameters and not preconceived or predetermined design solutions."

Parametric thinking in the design process context of best practice as defined by designer/technologist Chris Swartout of M Moser Associates is "a pedagogic approach that combines design and generative solution delivery through reliance on a multidisciplinary team's knowledge expertise at the outset of the project. This leads to increased productivity, achieving the desired outcome that balances all the interests of design, schedule, cost, aesthetics and functionality, while not predetermining a solution. This approach enhances design output and reduces abortive work."

Farshid Moussavi, professor in practice at Harvard University Graduate School of Design, has argued that parametric thinking at some level has always existed in architecture as a discipline because "great architecture has been aware of its societal role, and has consequently been informed by multivalent parameters."
