= Jill Millstone =

American chemist

- Education: Carnegie Mellon University; Northwestern University
- Known for: Nanoparticle synthesis Metal ligand chemistry
- Scientific career
- Workplaces: University of Pittsburgh

Jill Millstone is a professor of chemistry at the University of Pittsburgh. She works on metal-ligand chemistry in nanoparticle synthesis. She is the American Chemical Society Kavli Foundation Emerging Leader in Chemistry Lecturer for 2018.

== Early life and education ==
Millstone earned her bachelor's in chemistry at Carnegie Mellon University in 2003. She earned a PhD in materials chemistry at Northwestern University, working with Chad Mirkin. She was awarded the Northwestern University graduate school presidential fellowship.

== Research and career ==
Millstone worked as a postdoctoral researcher with Jean Fréchet and Paul Alivisatos at University of California, Berkeley. She was appointed to the University of Pittsburgh in 2011, earning a National Science Foundation career award.

In 2013 she developed nanoscale alloys that emitted so much near-infrared light they could be used in to visualise cells. Millstone uses small organic molecules to hold together metallic nanoparticles. Millstone's lab concentrates on the chemical synthesis of multifunctional nanoparticles and techniques to study their structural-property relationships. They work on nanoparticle colloidal arrays and their mechanochemistry. They use nuclear magnetic resonance, photoemission spectroscopy and electron microscopy. She won the 2015 Unilever Award for Outstanding Young Investigator in Colloid & Surfactant Science.

In June 2018 Millstone was announced the 2018 American Chemical Society Kavli Foundation Emerging Leader in Chemistry Lecturer. She won the University of Pittsburgh Distinguished Research Award. She is an associate editor at ACS Nano.
