= SonBinh Nguyen =

SonBinh T. Nguyen
- Education: California Institute of Technology (Ph.D); Pennsylvania State University (B.S.)
- Scientific career
- Fields: Chemistry
- Workplaces: Northwestern University
- Doctoral advisor: Robert Grubbs; Nathan S. Lewis
- Doctoral students: Nathan Gianneschi

SonBinh T. Nguyen is the McCormick Professor of Teaching Excellence and the Dow Chemical Company Research Professor of Chemistry at Northwestern University. He is also the former Director of the Integrated Sciences Program.

Nguyen received his B.S. in Chemistry from the Pennsylvania State University in 1990, where he worked with Gregory L. Geoffroy. He received his Ph.D. in 1995 from the California Institute of Technology, where he was supervised by Robert Grubbs and Nathan Lewis. From 1995 to 1996, he worked under K. Barry Sharpless at the Scripps Research Institute as an NSF Postdoctoral Fellow.

== Awards ==
In 1997, he received a Beckman Young Investigators Award. In 2000, he received an AFOSR PECASE award.
