= So-Jung Park =

South Korean scientist and professor

- Education: Ewha Womans University; Northwestern University
- Scientific career
- Workplaces: Ewha Womans University; Korea Institute of Science and Technology; University of Pennsylvania
- Thesis: DNA mediated assembly of nanostructured materials: structure, properties, and biodetection applications (2002)
- Doctoral advisor: Chad Mirkin
- Other academic advisors: Paul Barbara

So-Jung Park 박소정(朴昭靜) (born 1972) is a professor of chemistry at Ewha Womans University, Republic of Korea. Her research considers the self-assembly of nanoparticles and functional molecules for biomedical and optoelectronic devices. She serves as associate editor of ACS Applied Materials & Interfaces and Nanoscale.

== Early life and education ==
Park attended an all-girls middle school and high school, where she particularly enjoyed the science classes. She studied chemistry at college and earned her undergraduate degree in nanoscience at Ewha Womans University in 1994. During her undergraduate degree she worked under the supervision of Sung-Jin Kim on the synthesis of perovskite materials, completing a master's degree in 1996. After graduating from Ewha, Park joined the Korea Institute of Science and Technology, where she worked for two years. She moved to Northwestern University for her doctoral studies in 1998, where she worked with Chad Mirkin and earned her PhD in 2002. Her doctoral research on the physical properties of DNA-linked nanoparticles was awarded the American Chemical Society Nobel Laureate Signature Award for Graduate Education in Chemistry. Her research was the first to show that DNA could be used to form nanoparticle assemblies with tuneable inter-particle distances. She proposed a novel DNA detection method that made use of gold nanoparticles functionalised with oligonucleotides. When strands of DNA bins to the oligonucleotides it closes a gap between two electrodes, changing the conductivity. She worked as a postdoctoral fellow with Paul Barbara at the University of Texas at Austin.

== Research and career ==
In 2005 Park joined the faculty at the University of Pennsylvania. Her research considered molecular self-assembly, including the use of semiconducting and biological polymers. She was awarded an National Science Foundation CAREER Award to investigate structure-property relationships in soft materials.

Park moved back to South Korea in 2013, and was appointed a professor at Ewha Womans University. Here her work considers the self-assembly of nanoparticles and block co-polymers as well as dynamic nanostructures. The organisation of these components can result in functional materials with desirable structures and properties.

She has shown that it is possible to make superparamagnetic nanoparticles through the combination of magnetic nanoparticles and amphiphilic polymers. She has also worked on the self-assembly of block co-polymers, including the self-assembly of polythiophene into nanowires. The highly structured surfaces created by Park include spiky metal nanoshells. The nanoshells are synthesised using a silver-assisted seed-growth mechanisms, and can be used for Surface-enhanced Raman spectroscopy.

=== Selected publications ===
Her publications include:

- So-Jung, Park; Taton, T. Andrew; Mirkin, Chad A. (2002-02-22). "Array-based electrical detection of DNA with nanoparticle probes". Science. 295 (5559): 1503–1506. doi:10.1126/science.1067003. PMID 11859188. S2CID 35026422.
- Lee, Ki-Bum; So-Jung, Park; Mirkin, Chad A.; Smith, Jennifer C.; Mrksich, Milan (2002-03-01). "Protein nanoarrays generated by dip-pen nanolithography". Science. 295 (5560): 1702–1705. doi:10.1126/science.1067172. PMID 11834780. S2CID 1050903.
- Hickey, Robert J.; Haynes, Alyssa S.; Kikkawa, James M.; So-Jung, Park (2011-01-05). "Controlling the self-assembly structure of magnetic nanoparticles and amphiphilic block-copolymers: from micelles to vesicles". Journal of the American Chemical Society. 133 (5): 1517–1525. doi:10.1021/ja1090113. PMID 21208004.

Park serves as associate editor of ACS Applied Materials & Interfaces and Nanoscale.

== Personal life ==
Park is married with one child. Her husband teaches business administration at the University of Seoul.
