= Colloidal crystal =

Ordered array of colloidal particles

A colloidal crystal is an ordered array of colloidal particles and fine grained materials analogous to a standard crystal whose repeating subunits are atoms or molecules. A natural example of this phenomenon can be found in the gem opal, where spheres of silica assume a close-packed locally periodic structure under moderate compression. Bulk properties of a colloidal crystal depend on composition, particle size, packing arrangement, and degree of regularity. Applications include photonics, materials processing, and the study of self-assembly and phase transitions.

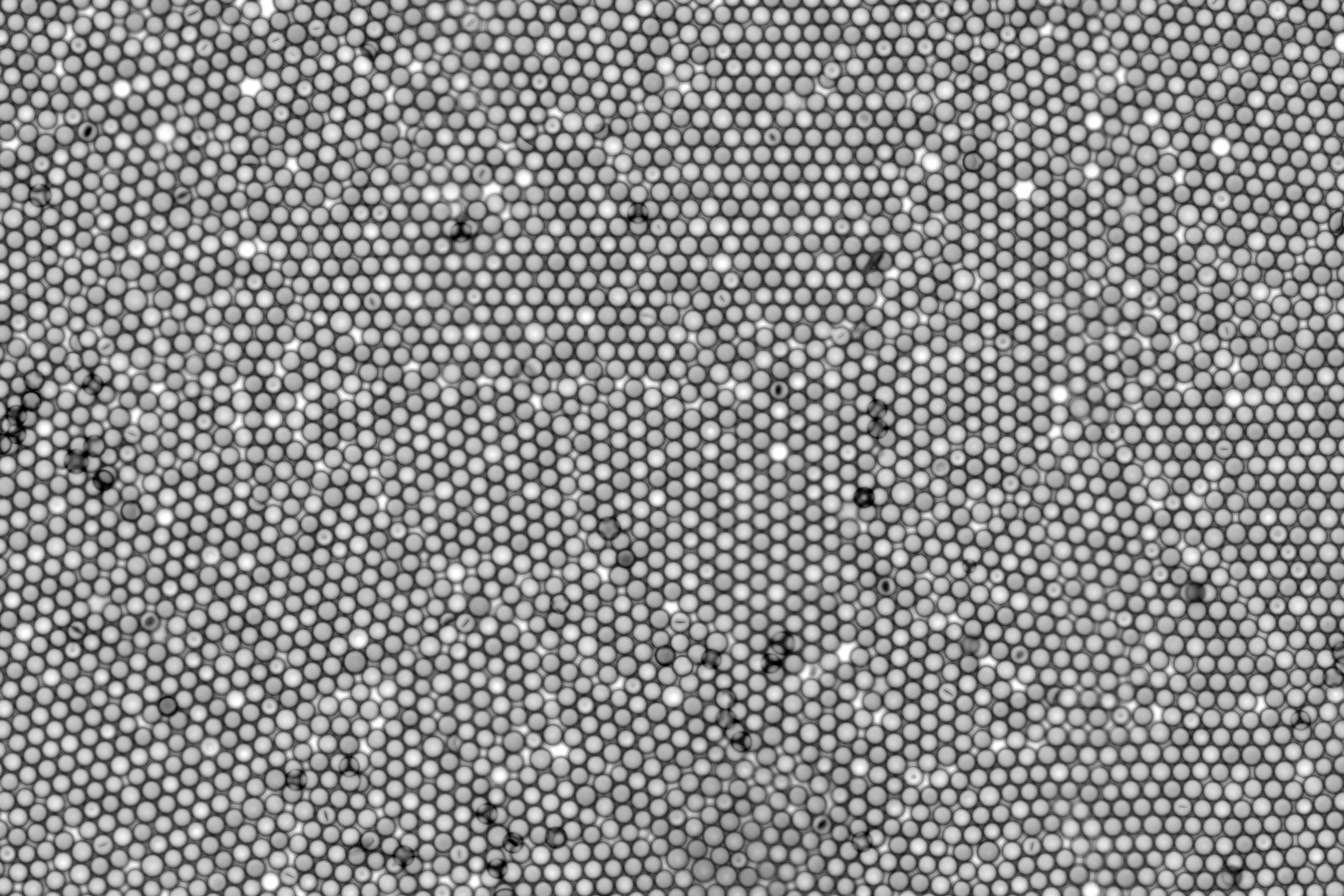
A collection of small 2D colloidal crystals with grain boundaries between them. Spherical glass particles (10 μm diameter) in water.

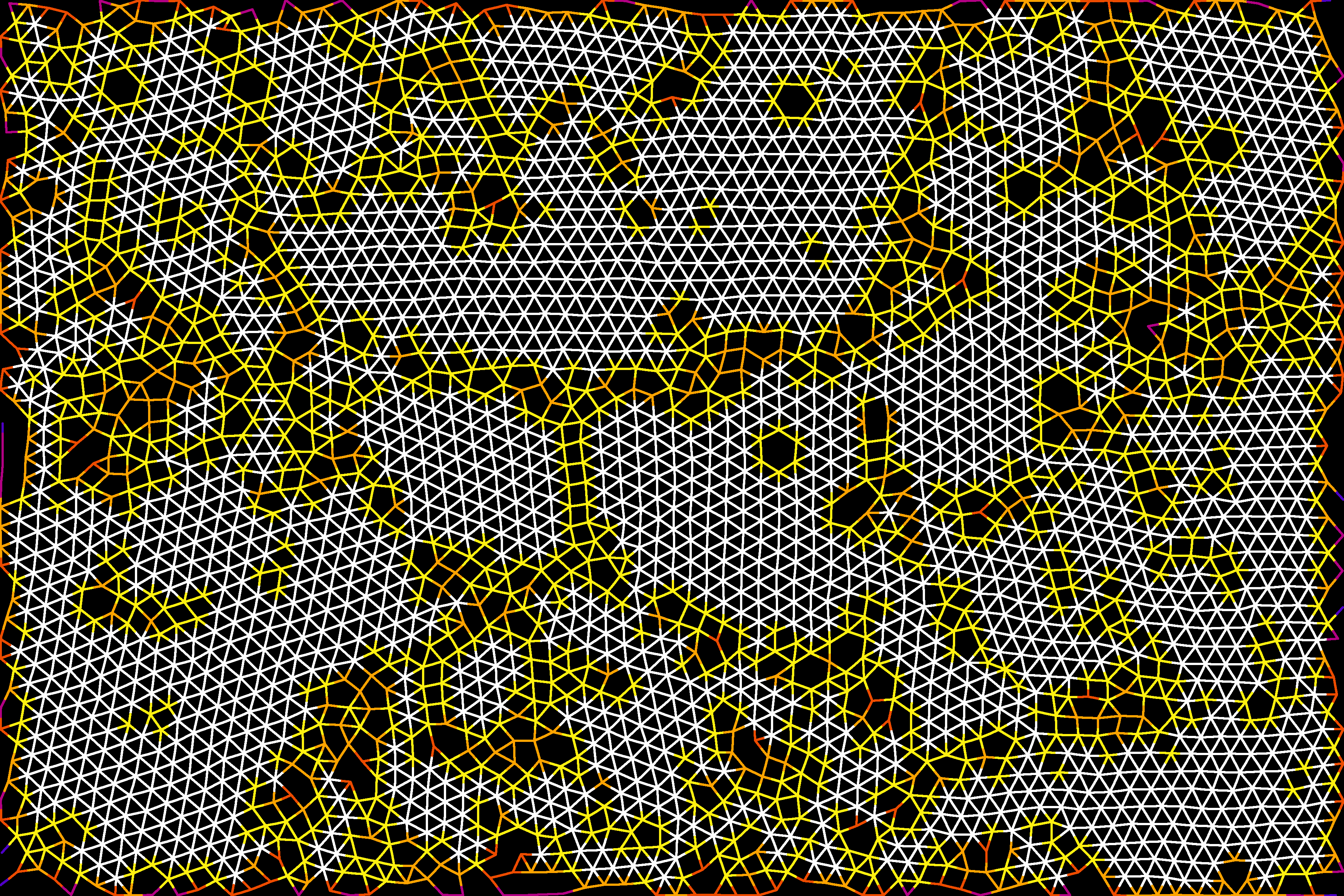
The connectivity of the crystals in the colloidal crystals above. Connections in white indicate that particle has six equally spaced neighbors and therefore forms part of a crystalline domain.

IUPAC definition

Assembly of colloid particles with a periodic structure that
conforms to symmetries familiar from molecular or atomic crystals.

Note: Colloidal crystals may be formed in a liquid medium or during
drying of particle suspension.

== Introduction ==
A colloidal crystal is a highly ordered array of particles which can be formed over a long range (to about a centimeter). Arrays such as this appear to be analogous to their atomic or molecular counterparts with proper scaling considerations. A good natural example of this phenomenon can be found in precious opal, where brilliant regions of pure spectral color result from close-packed domains of colloidal spheres of amorphous silicon dioxide, SiO_{2} (see above illustration). The spherical particles precipitate in highly siliceous pools and form highly ordered arrays after years of sedimentation and compression under hydrostatic and gravitational forces. The periodic arrays of spherical particles make similar arrays of interstitial voids, which act as a natural diffraction grating for light waves in photonic crystals, especially when the interstitial spacing is of the same order of magnitude as the incident lightwave.

== Origins ==
The origins of colloidal crystals go back to the mechanical properties of bentonite sols, and the optical properties of Schiller layers in iron oxide sols. The properties are supposed to be due to the ordering of monodisperse inorganic particles. Monodisperse colloids, capable of forming long-range ordered arrays, existing in nature. The discovery by W.M. Stanley of the crystalline forms of the tobacco and tomato viruses provided examples of this. Using X-ray diffraction methods, it was subsequently determined that when concentrated by centrifuging from dilute water suspensions, these virus particles often organized themselves into highly ordered arrays.

Rod-shaped particles in the tobacco mosaic virus could form a two-dimensional triangular lattice, while a body-centered cubic structure was formed from the almost spherical particles in the tomato Bushy Stunt Virus. In 1957, a letter describing the discovery of "A Crystallizable Insect Virus" was published in the journal Nature. Known as the Tipula Iridescent Virus, from both square and triangular arrays occurring on crystal faces, the authors deduced the face-centered cubic close-packing of virus particles. This type of ordered array has also been observed in cell suspensions, where the symmetry is well adapted to the mode of reproduction of the organism. The limited content of genetic material places a restriction on the size of the protein to be coded by it. The use of a large number of the same proteins to build a protective shell is consistent with the limited length of RNA or DNA content.

It has been known for many years that, due to repulsive Coulombic interactions, electrically charged macromolecules in an aqueous environment can exhibit long-range crystal-like correlations with interparticle separation distances often being considerably greater than the individual particle diameter. In all of the cases in nature, the same iridescence is caused by the diffraction and constructive interference of visible lightwaves which falls under Bragg’s law.

Because of the rarity and pathological properties, neither opal nor any of the organic viruses have been very popular in scientific laboratories. The number of experiments exploring the physics and chemistry of these “colloidal crystals” has emerged as a result of the simple methods which have evolved in 20 years for preparing synthetic monodisperse colloids, both polymer and mineral, and, through various mechanisms, implementing and preserving their long-range order formation.

== Trends ==
Colloidal crystals are receiving increased attention, largely due to their mechanisms of ordering and self-assembly, cooperative motion, structures similar to those observed in condensed matter by both liquids and solids, and structural phase transitions. Phase equilibrium has been considered within the context of their physical similarities, with appropriate scaling, to elastic solids. Observations of the interparticle separation distance has shown a decrease on ordering. This led to a re-evaluation of Langmuir's beliefs about the existence of a long-range attractive component in the interparticle potential.

Colloidal crystals have found application in optics as photonic crystals. Photonics is the science of generating, controlling, and detecting photons (packets of light), particularly in the visible and near Infrared, but also extending to the Ultraviolet, Infrared and far IR portions of the electromagnetic spectrum. The science of photonics includes the emission, transmission, amplification, detection, modulation, and switching of lightwaves over a broad range of frequencies and wavelengths. Photonic devices include electro-optic components such as lasers (Light Amplification by Stimulated Emission of Radiation) and optical fiber. Applications include telecommunications, information processing, illumination, spectroscopy, holography, medicine (surgery, vision correction, endoscopy), military (guided missile) technology, agriculture and robotics.

Polycrystalline colloidal structures have been identified as the basic elements of submicrometre colloidal materials science. Molecular self-assembly has been observed in various biological systems and underlies the formation of a wide variety of complex biological structures. This includes an emerging class of mechanically superior biomaterials based on microstructure features and designs found in nature.

The principal mechanical characteristics and structures of biological ceramics, polymer composites, elastomers, and cellular materials are being re-evaluated, with an emphasis on bioinspired materials and structures. Traditional approaches focus on design methods of biological materials using conventional synthetic materials. The uses have been identified in the synthesis of bioinspired materials through processes that are characteristic of biological systems in nature. This includes the nanoscale self-assembly of the components and the development of hierarchical structures.

== Bulk crystals ==
=== Aggregation ===
Aggregation in colloidal dispersions (or stable suspensions) has been characterized by the degree of interparticle attraction. For attractions strong relative to the thermal energy (given by kT), Brownian motion produces irreversibly flocculated structures with growth rates limited by the rate of particle diffusion. This leads to a description using such parameters as the degree of branching, ramification or fractal dimensionality. A reversible growth model has been constructed by modifying the cluster-cluster aggregation model with a finite inter-particle attraction energy.

In systems where forces of attraction forces are buffered to some degree, a balance of forces leads to an equilibrium phase separation, that is particles coexist with equal chemical potential in two distinct structural phases. The role of the ordered phase as an elastic colloidal solid has been evidenced by the elastic (or reversible) deformation due to the force of gravity. This deformation can be quantified by the distortion of the lattice parameter, or inter-particle spacing.

=== Self-assembly ===
Self-assembly is the most common term in use in the modern scientific community to describe the spontaneous aggregation of particles (atoms, molecules, colloids, micelles, etc.) without the influence of any external forces. Large groups of such particles are known to assemble themselves into thermodynamically stable, structurally well-defined arrays, quite reminiscent of one of the 7 crystal systems found in metallurgy and mineralogy (e.g. face-centered cubic, body-centered cubic, etc.). The fundamental difference in equilibrium structure is in the spatial scale of the unit cell (or lattice parameter) in each particular case.

Molecular self-assembly is found widely in biological systems and provides the basis of a wide variety of complex biological structures. This includes an emerging class of mechanically superior biomaterials based on microstructural features and designs found in nature. Thus, self-assembly is also emerging as a new strategy in chemical synthesis and nanotechnology. Molecular crystals, liquid crystals, colloids, micelles, emulsions, phase-separated polymers, thin films and self-assembled monolayers all represent examples of the types of highly ordered structures which are obtained using these techniques. The distinguishing feature of these methods is self-organization

=== Viscoelasticity ===
Periodic ordered lattices behave as linear viscoelastic solids when subjected to small amplitude mechanical deformations. Okano's group experimentally correlated the shear modulus to the frequency of standing shear modes using mechanical resonance techniques in the ultrasonic range (40 to 70 kHz). In oscillatory experiments at lower frequencies (< 40 Hz), the fundamental mode of vibration as well as several higher frequency partial overtones (or harmonics) have been observed. Structurally, most systems exhibit a clear instability toward the formation of periodic domains of relatively short-range order Above a critical amplitude of oscillation, plastic deformation is the primary mode of structural rearrangement.

=== Phase transitions ===
Equilibrium phase transitions (e.g. order/disorder), an equation of state, and the kinetics of colloidal crystallization have all been actively studied, leading to the development of several methods to control the self-assembly of the colloidal particles. Examples include colloidal epitaxy and space-based reduced-gravity techniques, as well as the use of temperature gradients to define a density gradient. This is somewhat counterintuitive as temperature does not play a role in determining the hard-sphere phase diagram. However, hard-sphere single crystals (size 3 mm) have been obtained from a sample in a concentration regime that would remain in the liquid state in the absence of a temperature gradient.

=== Phonon dispersion ===
Using a single colloidal crystal, phonon dispersion of the normal modes of vibration modes were investigated using photon correlation spectroscopy, or dynamic light scattering. This technique relies on the relaxation or decay of concentration (or density) fluctuations. These are often associated with longitudinal modes in the acoustic range. A distinctive increase in the sound wave velocity (and thus the elastic modulus) by a factor of 2.5 has been observed at the structural transition from colloidal liquid to colloidal solid, or point of ordering.

=== Kossel lines ===
Using a single body-centered cubic colloidal crystal, the occurrence of Kossel lines in diffraction patterns were used to monitor the initial nucleation and subsequent motion caused distortion of the crystal. Continuous or homogeneous deformations occurring beyond the elastic limit produce a 'flowing crystal', where the nucleation site density increases significantly with increasing particle concentration. Lattice dynamics have been investigated for longitudinal as well as transverse modes. The same technique was used to evaluate the crystallization process near the edge of a glass tube. The former might be considered analogous to a homogeneous nucleation event—whereas the latter would clearly be considered a heterogeneous nucleation event, being catalyzed by the surface of the glass tube.

=== Growth rates ===
Small-angle laser light scattering has provided information about spatial density fluctuations or the shape of growing crystal grains. In addition, confocal laser scanning microscopy has been used to observe crystal growth near a glass surface. Electro-optic shear waves have been induced by an ac pulse, and monitored by reflection spectroscopy as well as light scattering. Kinetics of colloidal crystallization have been measured quantitatively, with nucleation rates being depending on the suspension concentration. Similarly, crystal growth rates have been shown to decrease linearly with increasing reciprocal concentration.

=== Microgravity ===
Experiments performed in microgravity on the Space Shuttle Columbia suggest that the typical face-centered cubic structure may be induced by gravitational stresses. Crystals tend to exhibit the hcp structure alone (random stacking of hexagonally close-packed crystal planes), in contrast with a mixture of (rhcp) and face-centred cubic packing when allowed sufficient time to reach mechanical equilibrium under gravitational forces on Earth. Glassy (disordered or amorphous) colloidal samples have become fully crystallized in microgravity in less than two weeks!

== Thin films ==
Two-dimensional (thin film) semi-ordered lattices have been studied using an optical microscope, as well as those collected at electrode surfaces. Digital video microscopy has revealed the existence of an equilibrium hexatic phase as well as a strongly first-order liquid-to-hexatic and hexatic-to-solid phase transition. These observations are in agreement with the explanation that melting might proceed via the unbinding of pairs of lattice dislocations.

=== Long-range order ===
Long-range order has been observed in thin films of colloidal liquids under oil—with the faceted edge of an emerging single crystal in alignment with the diffuse streaking pattern in the liquid phase. Structural defects have been directly observed in the ordered solid phase as well as at the interface of the solid and liquid phases. Mobile lattice defects have been observed via Bragg reflections, due to the modulation of the light waves in the strain field of the defect and its stored elastic strain energy.

=== Mobile lattice defects ===
All of the experiments have led to at least one common conclusion: colloidal crystals may indeed mimic their atomic counterparts on appropriate scales of length (spatial) and time (temporal). Defects have been reported to flash by in the blink of an eye in thin films of colloidal crystals under oil using a simple optical microscope. But quantitatively measuring the rate of its propagation provides an entirely different challenge, which has been measured at somewhere near the speed of sound.

== Non-spherical colloid based crystals ==
Crystalline thin-films from non-spherical colloids were produced using convective assembly techniques. Colloid shapes included dumbbell, hemisphere, disc, and sphero-cylinder shapes. Both purely crystalline and plastic crystal phases could be produced, depending on the aspect ratio of the colloidal particle. The low aspect ratio, such as bulge, eye-ball, and snowman-like non-spherical colloids, which spontaneously self-assembled to photonic crystal array with high uniformity. The particles were crystallized both as 2D (i.e., monolayer) and 3D (i.e., multilayer) structures. The observed lattice and particle orientations experimentally confirmed a body of theoretical work on the condensed phases of non-spherical objects. Assembly of crystals from non-spherical colloids can also be directed via the use of electric or magnetic fields.

== Applications ==
=== Photonics ===
Technologically, colloidal crystals have found application in the world of optics as photonic band gap (PBG) materials (or photonic crystals). Synthetic opals as well as inverse opal configurations are being formed either by natural sedimentation or applied forces, both achieving similar results: long-range ordered structures which provide a natural diffraction grating for lightwaves of wavelength comparable to the particle size.

Novel PBG materials are being formed from opal-semiconductor-polymer composites, typically utilizing the ordered lattice to create an ordered array of holes (or pores) which is left behind after removal or decomposition of the original particles. Residual hollow honeycomb structures provide a relative index of refraction (ratio of matrix to air) sufficient for selective filters. Variable index liquids or liquid crystals injected into the network alter the ratio and band gap.

Such frequency-sensitive devices may be ideal for optical switching and frequency selective filters in the ultraviolet, visible, or infrared portions of the spectrum, as well as higher efficiency antennae at microwave and millimeter wave frequencies.

=== Colloidal robots ===
Colloidal robots are autonomous machines composed of particulates suspended as a colloid. Two crucial considerations are autonomy and integration with other colloidal robotic systems. Autonomy is key to calling such systems ‘robots’, and means the ability to make decisions without external input/ stimuli. Colloidal robots are placed between ‘smart dust’ (silicon based sub-millimeter devices) and ‘active colloids’ (smaller self-propelled colloidal systems) in size and functionality.

Colloidal robots are proposed for a few main roles:

- communication nodes and distributed information networks in confined or hard‑to‑access spaces,
- micro-scale actuators and propulsion systems,
- micro-scale energy harvesting (with the eventual goal of self-powered robots).

Fabrication can be of two types: top-down or bottom-up. Top-down approaches include CMOS lithography with precise control over structures, self-folding architectures, or high-resolution printing (for cases where nm-scale resolution is not required). Bottom-up approaches typically employ self-assembly into an ordered structure at chosen length scales, although fully autonomous colloidal robots that self-assemble are still in their infancy.

=== DNA-based colloidal crystals ===
DNA-based colloidal crystals are an emerging field, where nanoparticles are surface functionalized with nucleic acids, creating a spherical nanoparticle that finds applications in various fields from materials science to biomedical engineering. Typically a metal core (many different sizes, shapes have been researched) is used along with a dense surface layer of nucleic acids in a specific orientation (with different densities, properties etc.). The nanoparticle core can be thought of as an atom, and the NAs as an electron cloud, and tuning the NAs helps tune the electrostatics and bonding, helping form a wide range of colloidal structures.

The field has come a long way since its inception in 1996, when Chad Mirkin’s group worked on DNA-functionalized gold nanoparticles that assembled into periodic structures. Further work led to the understanding that this template defined a new sort of ‘spherical nucleic acid’, that has since been used to make diagnostic and therapeutic tools. Single crystalline DNA-based colloidal crystals have also shown promise in catalysis and in optical devices, in part due to the wide range of metals that can be used to make the core.

While the goal of most researchers is to look at closed packed systems with high degrees of order, there is also a body of work on designing complex, but non close-packed systems such as with the use of DNA origami particles, which allow precise nanoscale control over shape and binding sites.

=== Stimuli-responsive colloidal crystals for structural color and sensing ===
With its origins in the study of opals, colloidal crystals are now routinely synthesized and studied. One interesting use is to create structural color, by controlling properties such as functionalization, charge, etc., to create assemblies of specific structure and dimensions. Materials with photonic band gaps (PBGs) reflect parts of the visible spectrum and thus have color. But these materials are also color-fast, since no dyes are involved, a great advantage for many applications in real life.

The wavelength of reflection can be calculated from a combined Bragg’s and Snell’s law that takes into account the distance between colloidal particles (d), refractive index (n), and the packing fraction of the crystal ($\phi$): $\lambda_{max} = (8/3)^{1/2} (d/m) (\Sigma n_{i}^2 \phi_i - \sin^2 \theta)^{1/2}$.

Stimuli responsive polymer colloidal crystals have been used to make chemical sensors (colorimetric, among other mechanisms) to detect various analytes such as alcohols, glucose etc. When fabricated along with molecular imprinting techniques, these sensors can be made highly selective towards single analytes of interest, and are particularly useful in detecting toxins in ultra low concentrations.

== See also ==
- Crystal growth
- Crystal structure
- Ceramic engineering
- Diffusion-limited aggregation
- Nanomaterials
- Nanoparticle
- Nucleation
- Photonic crystal
- Opal
- Sol-gel
