= NanoInk =

NanoInk, Inc
- Company type: Private
- Industry: Nanotechnology, pharmaceuticals
- Founded: 2002
- Headquarters: Skokie, Illinois, U.S.
- Website: www.nanoink.net

NanoInk, Inc. was a nanotechnology company headquartered in Skokie, Illinois, with a MEMS fabrication facility in Campbell, California.

== Overview ==
A spin-off of Northwestern University and founded by Northwestern professor Chad Mirkin, NanoInk specialized in nanometer-scale manufacturing and applications development for the life science and semiconductor industries. Dip Pen Nanolithography (DPN) was a patented and proprietary nanofabrication technology marketed as an anti-counterfeiting aid for pharmaceutical products.

Other key applications included nanoscale additive repair and nanoscale rapid prototyping. Located in the Illinois Science and Technology Park, north of Chicago, NanoInk had nearly 400 patents and applications filed worldwide and had licensing agreements with Northwestern University, Stanford University, the University of Illinois at Urbana-Champaign, and the Georgia Institute of Technology.

== History ==
Within seven months of its formation, NanoInk released its first product, the DPN-System-1, which turned any atomic force microscope into a DPN machine.

In February 2013, NanoInk announced it would be shutting down due to insufficient funding when its primary backer, Ann Lurie, decided to pull the plug after investing $150 million over a decade.

== See also ==
- Nanosys
