= Mohammadreza Ghadiri =

Iranian-American chemist

M. Reza Ghadiri is an Iranian-American chemist who studies nanoscale science and technology.

Ghadiri holds a Ph.D. degree in chemistry (1987) from the University of Wisconsin–Madison. He is currently a professor of chemistry at The Scripps Research Institute.

The 1998 Feynman Prize was awarded to Ghadiri for work in constructing molecular structures through the use of self-organization. His lab also pioneered the development of peptide self-replication.

== Awards ==
- Searle Scholars Award 1991-1994;
- Arnold & Mabel Beckman Foundation, Beckman Young Investigators Award, 1991-1993;
- Alfred P. Sloan Research Fellow 1993-1995;
- Eli Lilly Grantee 1994-1995;
- ACS Award in Pure Chemistry 1995;
- Arthur C. Cope Scholar Award, American Chemical Society 1999;
- Feynman Prize in Nanotechnology 1998;
- Merck-Frosst Lecturer, University of Victoria, British Columbia 2001;
- Belleau Lecturer, McGill University, Montreal, Quebec 2001.

== See also ==
- Iranian science
