= Supramolecular catalysis =

Field of chemistry

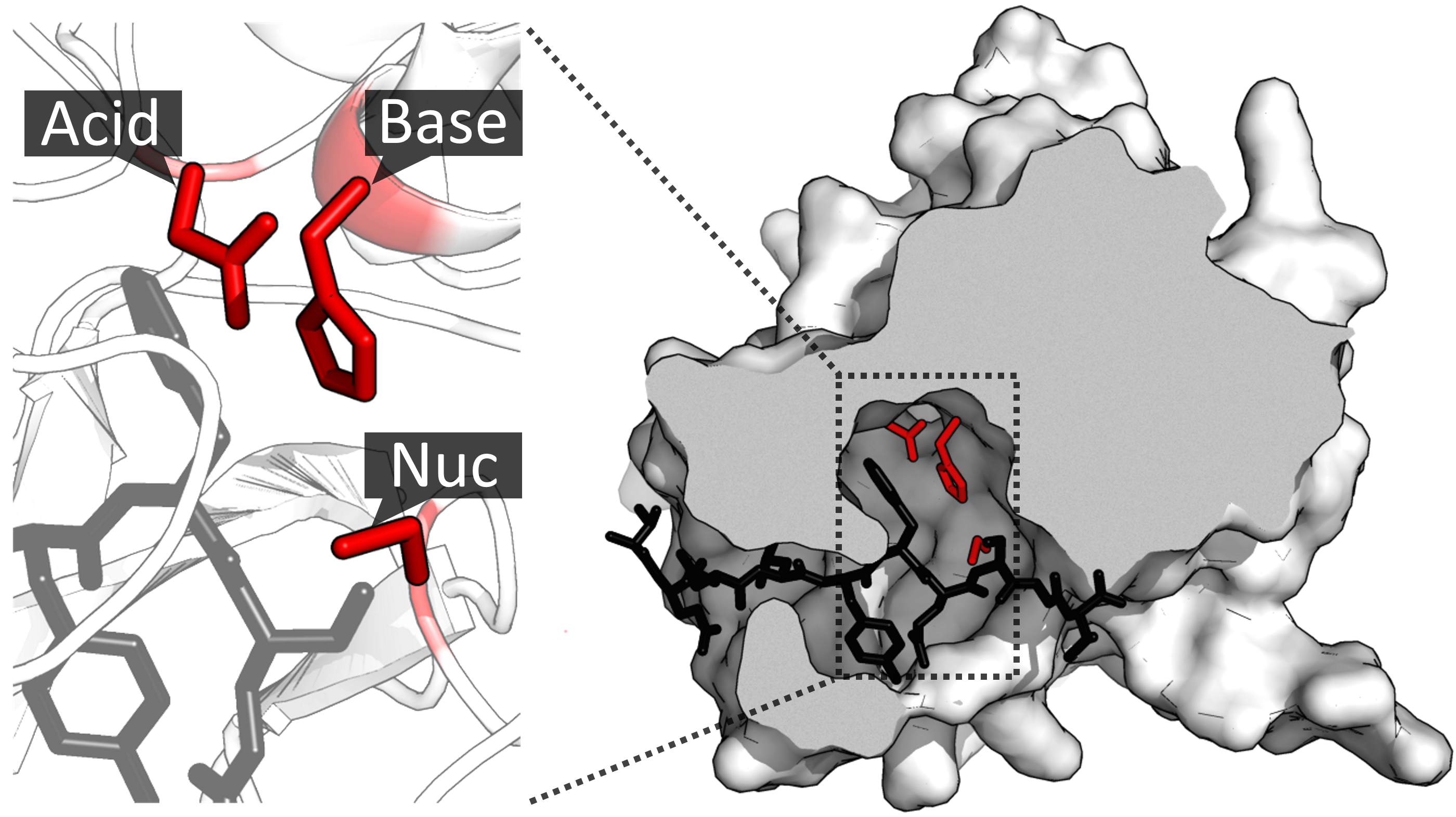
An enzyme (TEV protease, PDB: 1lvb) is an example of supramolecular catalysts in nature. One goal of supramolecular catalysis is to mimic active site of enzymes.

Supramolecular catalysis refers to an application of supramolecular chemistry, especially molecular recognition and guest binding, toward catalysis. This field was precedented by enzymatic systems which, unlike classical organic chemistry reactions, utilise non-covalent interactions such as hydrogen bonding, electrostatic interactions, cation-pi interactions, and hydrophobic forces to accelerate reactions and/or lead to enhanced selectivity. Because enzymes are structurally complex and difficult to modify, supramolecular catalysts offer a potentially simpler model for studying factors involved in catalytic efficiency of the enzyme. Another goal that motivates this field is the development of efficient and practical catalysts that may or may not have an enzyme equivalent in nature. While supramolecular forces no doubt influence many catalytic processes, especially in asymmetric catalysis, none of the examples below have achieved commercialisation.

== History ==
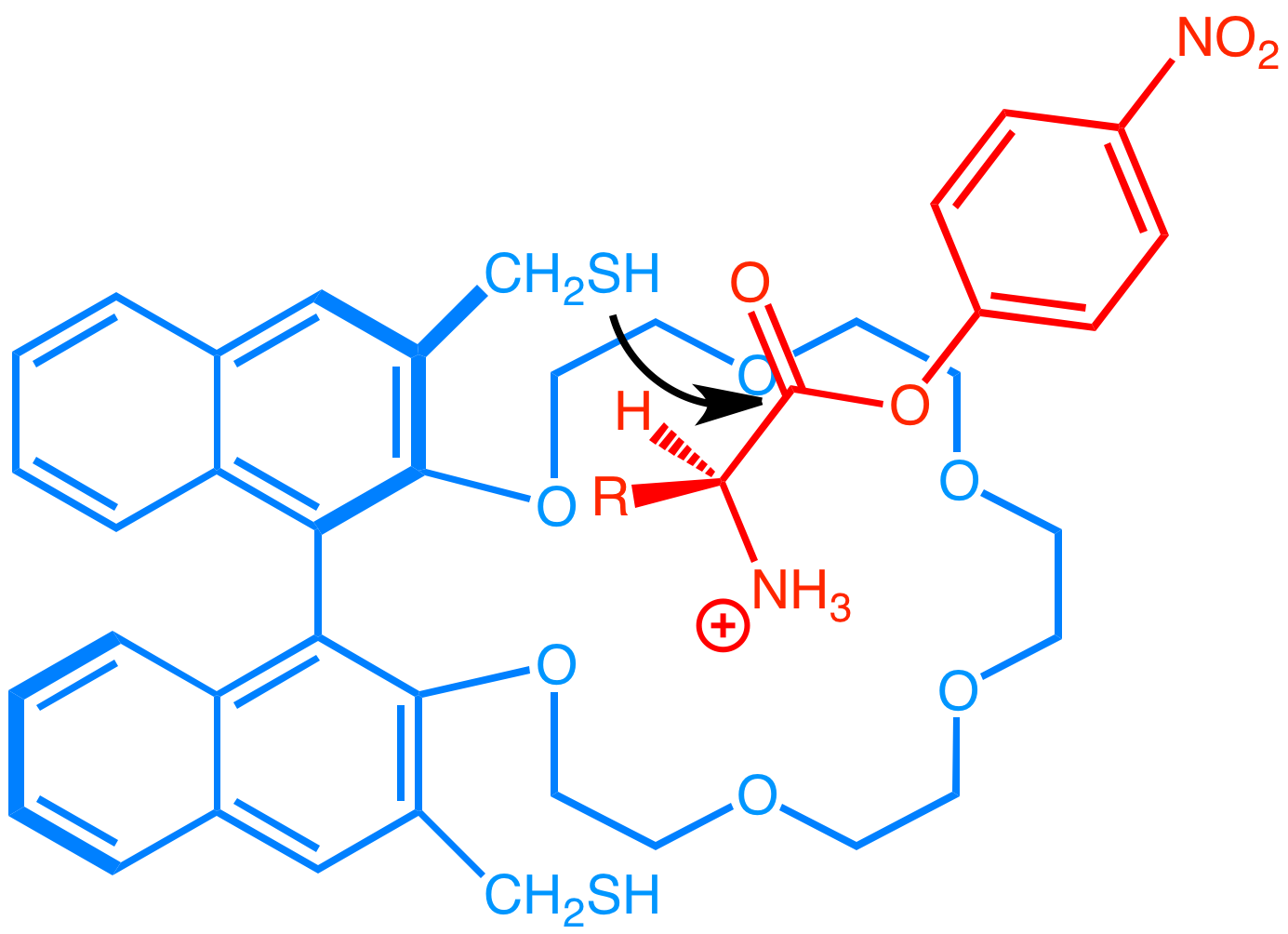
An early example of enzyme mimics. Cram's 1976 crown ether acyl transfer catalyst.

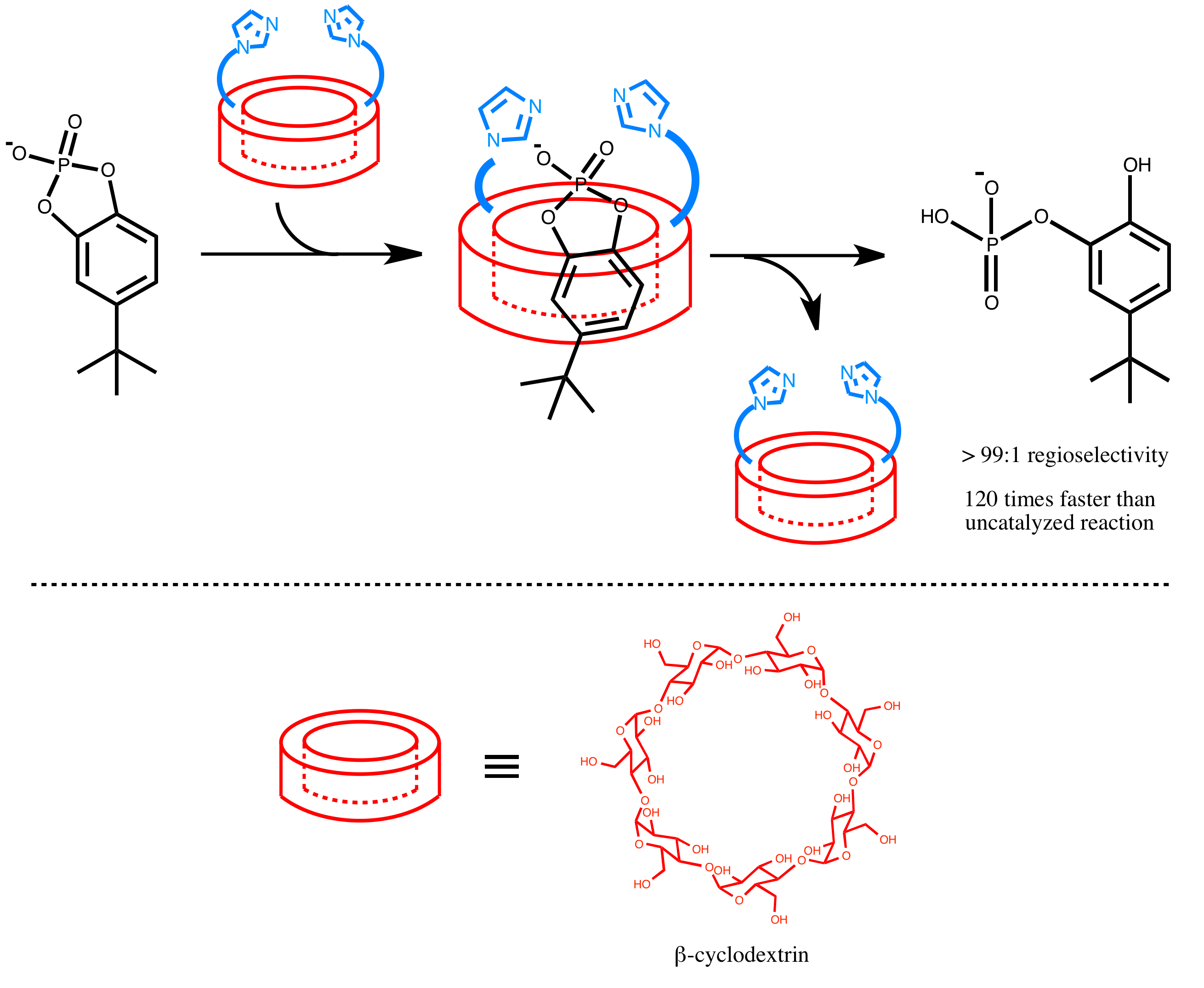
Breslow's Regioselective Hydrolysis of Cyclic Phosphate Catalysed by Diimidazole-beta-cyclodextrin

The term supramolecular chemistry was defined by Jean-Marie Lehn as "the chemistry of intermolecular bonds, covering structures and functions of the entities formed by association of two or more chemical species" in his Nobel lecture in 1987. However, the concept of supramolecular catalysis was started way earlier in 1946 by Linus Pauling, when he founded the theory of enzymatic catalysis – in which rate acceleration is the result of non-covalent stabilisation of the transition state by an enzyme.

Nevertheless, it was not until a few decades later that an artificial enzyme was developed. Early enzyme mimics were based on crown ethers and cryptands. In 1976, less than ten years after the discovery of crown ether, Cram et al. developed a functionalised binapthyl crown ether that catalsze transacylation. The catalyst makes use the crown ether's ability to capture cations to bind to the ammonium moiety in the substrate, and subsequently employs the nearby thiol to cleave the ester.

From the early 1970s, cyclodextrins have been extensively studied for their encapsulation properties and used as binding sites in supramolecular catalysis. Cyclodextrins have a rigid ring structure, a hydrophilic surface, and a hydrophobic cavity on the inside; therefore, they are capable of binding organic molecules in aqueous solution. In 1978, with the background knowledge that the hydrolysis of m-tert-butylphenyl acetate is accelerated in the presence of 2-benzimidazoleacetic acid and α-cyclodextrin, Breslow et al. developed a catalyst based on a β-cyclodextrin carrying two imidazole groups. This cyclodextrin catalytic system mimics ribonuclease A by its use of a neutral imidazole and an imidazolium cation to selectively cleave cyclic phosphate substrates. The rate of the reaction is enhanced 120 times, and unlike hydrolysis by simple base like sodium hydroxide that gives a 1:1 mixture of the products, this catalyst yielded a 99:1 selectivity for one compound.

1993 witnessed the first self-assembled capsule and in 1997 the so-called "tennis ball" structure was used to catalyze a Diels-Alder reaction. Self-assembled molecules have an advantage over crown ethers and cyclodextrins in that they can capture significantly larger molecules or even two molecules at the same time. In the following decades, many research groups, such as those of Makoto Fujita, Ken Raymond, and Jonathan Nitschke, developed cage-like catalysts via molecular self-assembly.

In 2002, Sanders and coworkers published the use of a dynamic combinatorial library to construct a receptor, and in 2003 they employed the technique to develop a catalyst for the Diels-Alder reaction.

== Mechanism of catalysis ==
=== Orienting reactive and labile groups ===
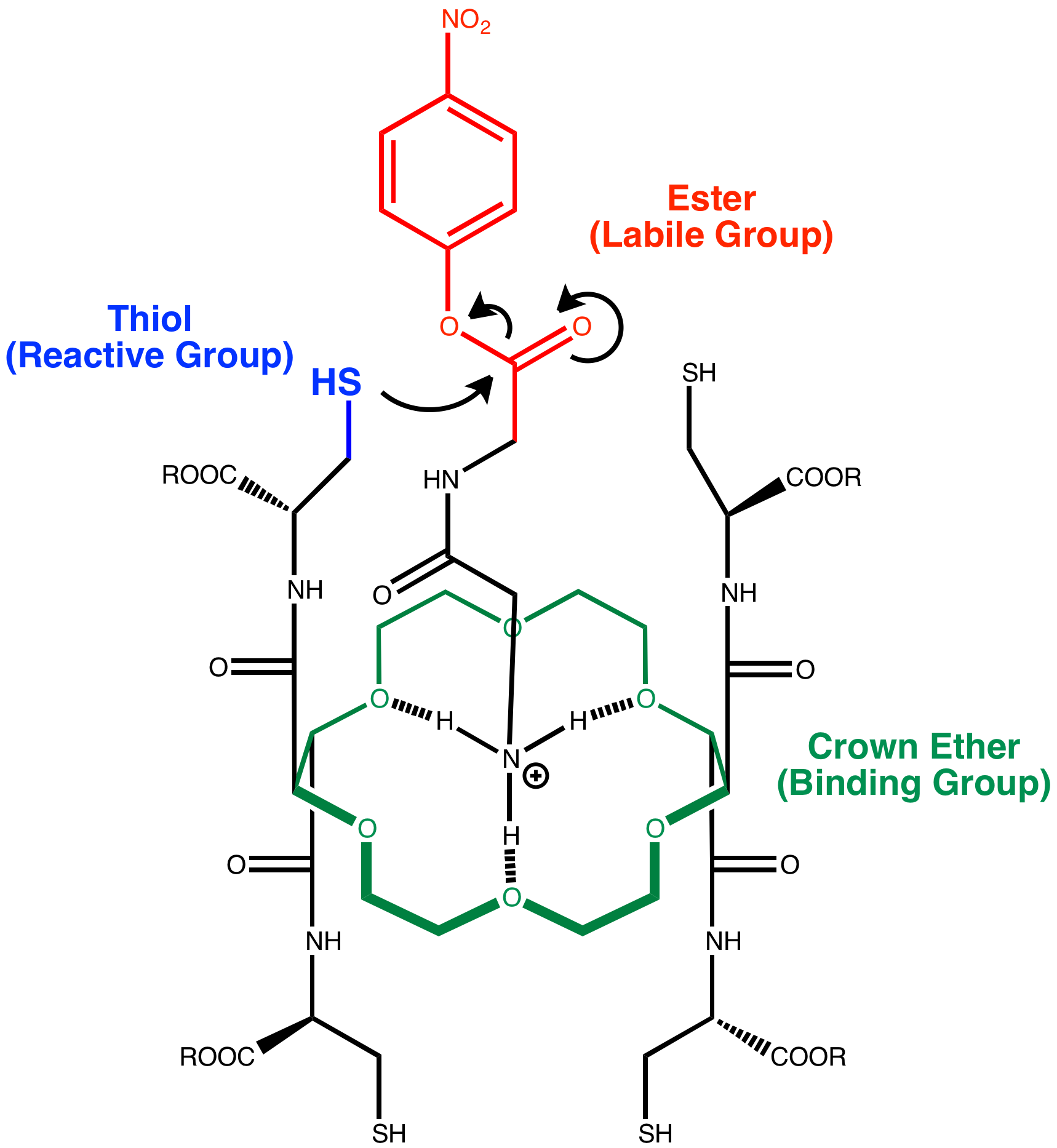
A chiral substituted crown ether catalyst developed by Jean-Marie Lehn for ester cleavage. The crown ether binds the ammonium ion such that the labile ester group (in red) is positioned next to the reactive thiol group (in blue).

A supramolecular host can bind to a guest molecule in such a way that the guest's labile group is positioned close to the reactive group of another reactive species. The proximity of the two groups enhances the probability that the reaction could occur and thus the reaction rate is increased. This is similar to the principle of preorganization, which states that complexation could be improved if the binding motifs are preorganized in a well-defined position so that the host does not require any major conformational change for complexation. In this case, the catalyst is preorganized such that no major conformational changes are required for the reaction to occur. A notable example of a catalyst that employs this mechanism is Jean-Marie Lehn's crown ether. Catalysts based on functionalized cyclodextrins also often employ this mode of catalysis.

=== Raising the effective substrate concentration ===
Bimolecular reactions are highly dependent on the concentration of substrates. Therefore, when a supramolecular container encapsulates both reactants within its small cavity, the effective local concentration of the reactants is increased and, as a result of an entropic effect (a decrease in the number of available degrees of freedom), the rate of the reaction is accelerated – almost behaving in a pseudo-unimolecular fashion; that is to say, the rate of an 'intramolecular' reaction is faster than that of the corresponding 'intermolecular' reaction.

Although high increase in effective concentration is observed, systems that employ this mode of catalysis have a tiny rate acceleration compared to enzymes. A proposed explanation is that in a supramolecular container, the substrates are not as tightly bound as in an enzyme. The reagents still have some wiggle room in a cavity, and so the entropic effect may not be as important. Even in the case of enzymes, computational studies have shown that the entropic effect may have been overestimated.

Examples of systems that work via this mechanism are Rebek's tennis ball and Fujita's octahedral complex.

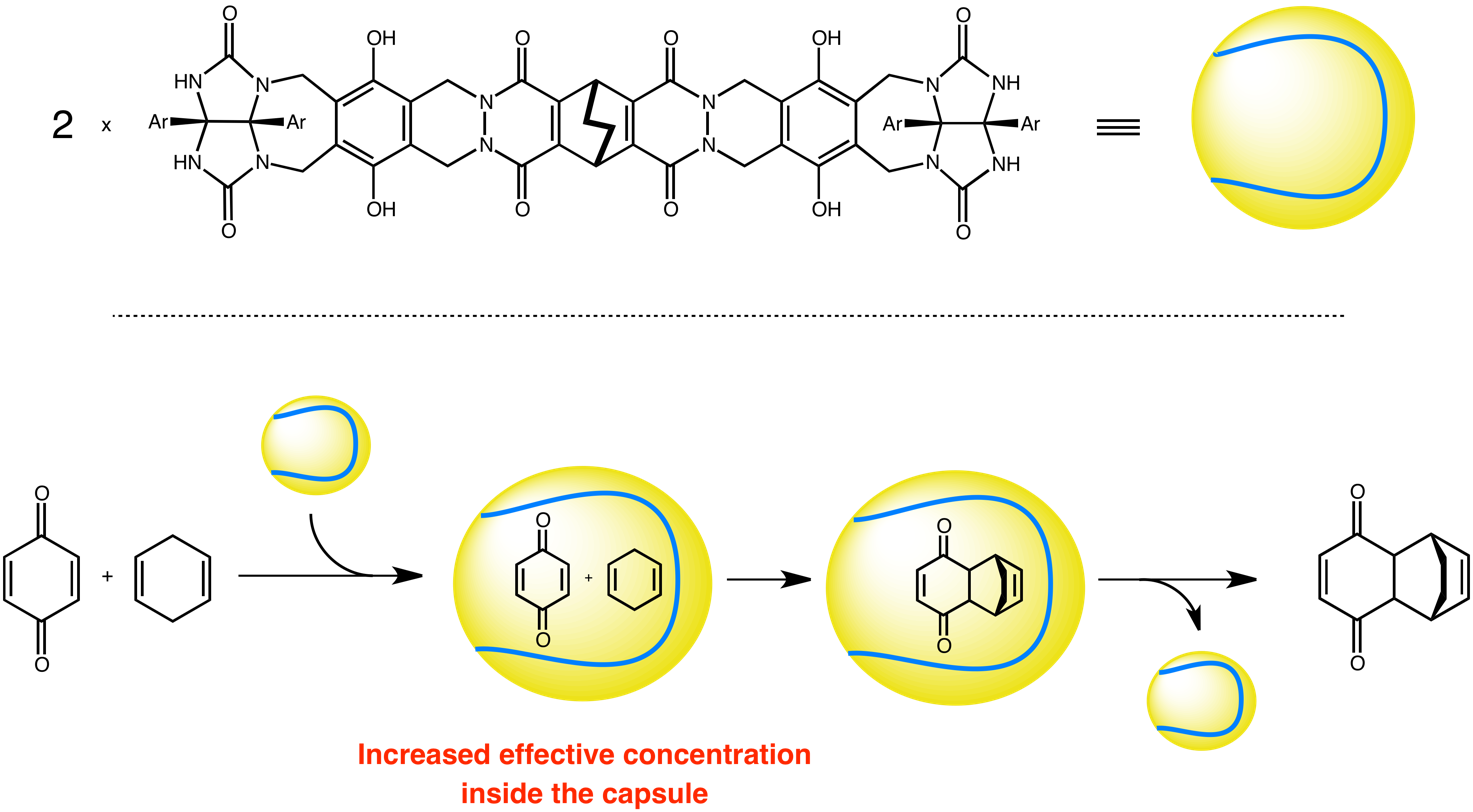
Hydrogen-bonded glycouril dimer catalyst developed by Julius Rebek Jr. for Diels-Alder reactions. The catalyst encapsulates the diene and dienophile, increasing the effective concentration of reactants.

=== Stabilising the transition state ===
Generic potential energy diagram showing the effect of a catalyst.

Supramolecular catalysts can accelerate reactions not just by placing the two reactants in close proximity, but also by stabilising the transition state of the reaction and reducing activation energy. While this fundamental principle of catalysis is common in small molecule or heterogeneous catalysts, supramolecular catalysts have had a difficult time utilising this concept due to their rigid structures. Unlike enzymes that can change shape to accommodate the substrates, supramolecules do not have that kind of flexibility and hence rarely achieve the sub-angstrom adjustment required for perfect transition state stabilisation.

An example of a catalyst of this type is Sanders' porphyrin trimer. A Diels-Alder reaction between two pyridine functionalised substrates normally yields a mixture of endo- and exo- products. In the presence of the two catalysts, however, complete endo-selectivity or exo-selectivity could be obtained. The underlying cause is the coordination between the pyridine on the maleimide substrate and the zinc ion on the porphyrin moiety of the cage. Depending on the shape of the catalysts, one product is preferred over the other.

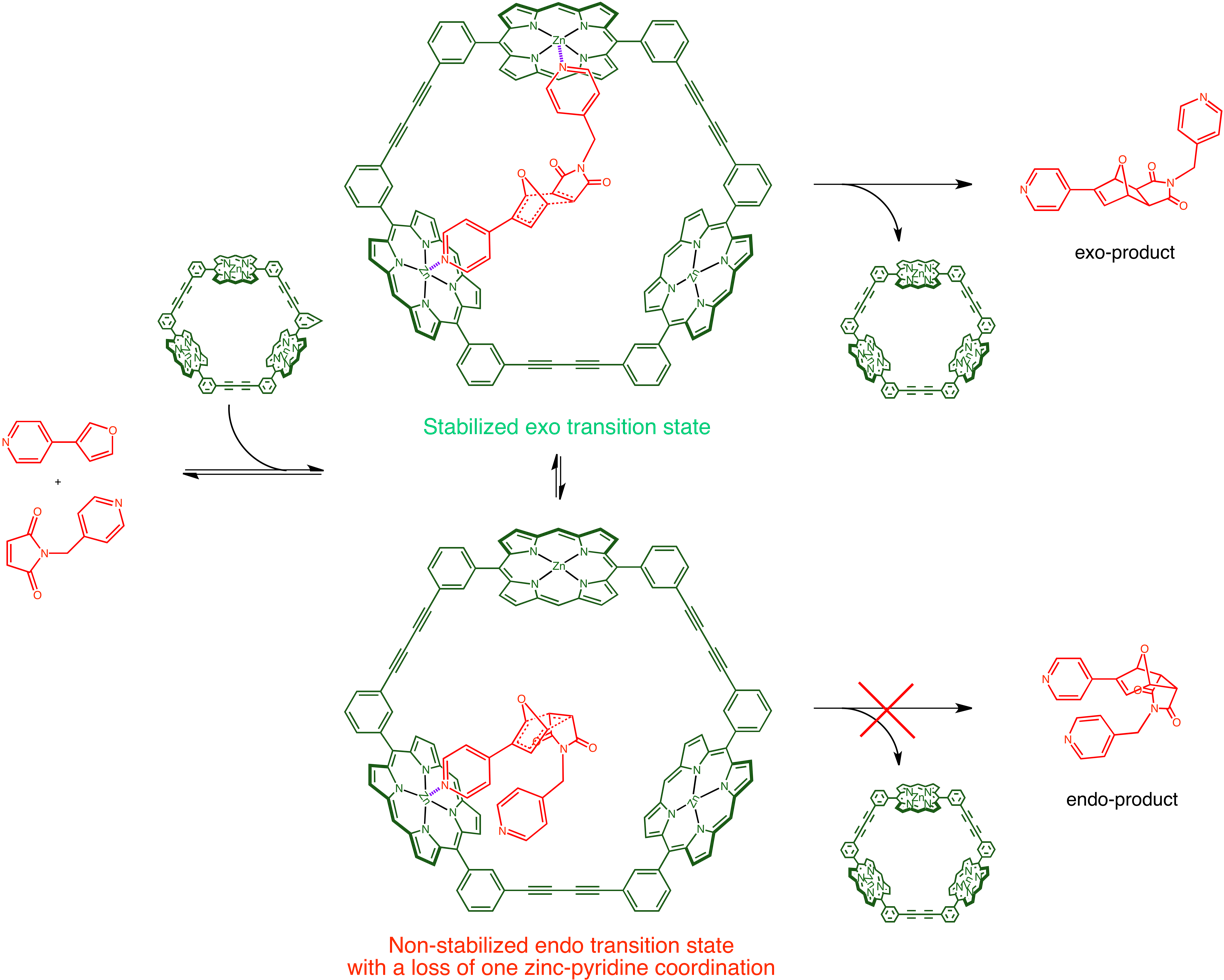
Porphyrin trimer catalyst developed by Jeremy Sanders for exo-selective Diels-Alder reactions. The catalyst stabilises the exo transition state by strategic binding of a zinc(II) ion to the pyridine nitrogen atoms on the diene and dienophile.

== Approaches to making supramolecular catalysts ==
=== Design approach ===
One approach to supramolecular catalysts focuses on macromolecular receptors with appropriately placed catalytic functional groups. These catalysts are often inspired by the structure of enzymes with the catalytic group mimicking reactive amino acid residues, but unlike real enzymes, the binding sites of these catalysts are rigid structures made from chemical building blocks. This approach has failed. Alternative approaches use of many small flexible building blocks with competing weak interactions that allow the catalyst to adjust its structure to accommodate the substrate better. There is a direct trade-off between the enthalpic benefit from a flexible structure and the entropic benefit from rigid structure. Flexible structures may bind the transition state better allow more room for the substrates to move and vibrate. Most supramolecular chemists in the past have preferred to build rigid structures out of fear of entropic cost.

=== Transition state analogue selection/screening approach ===
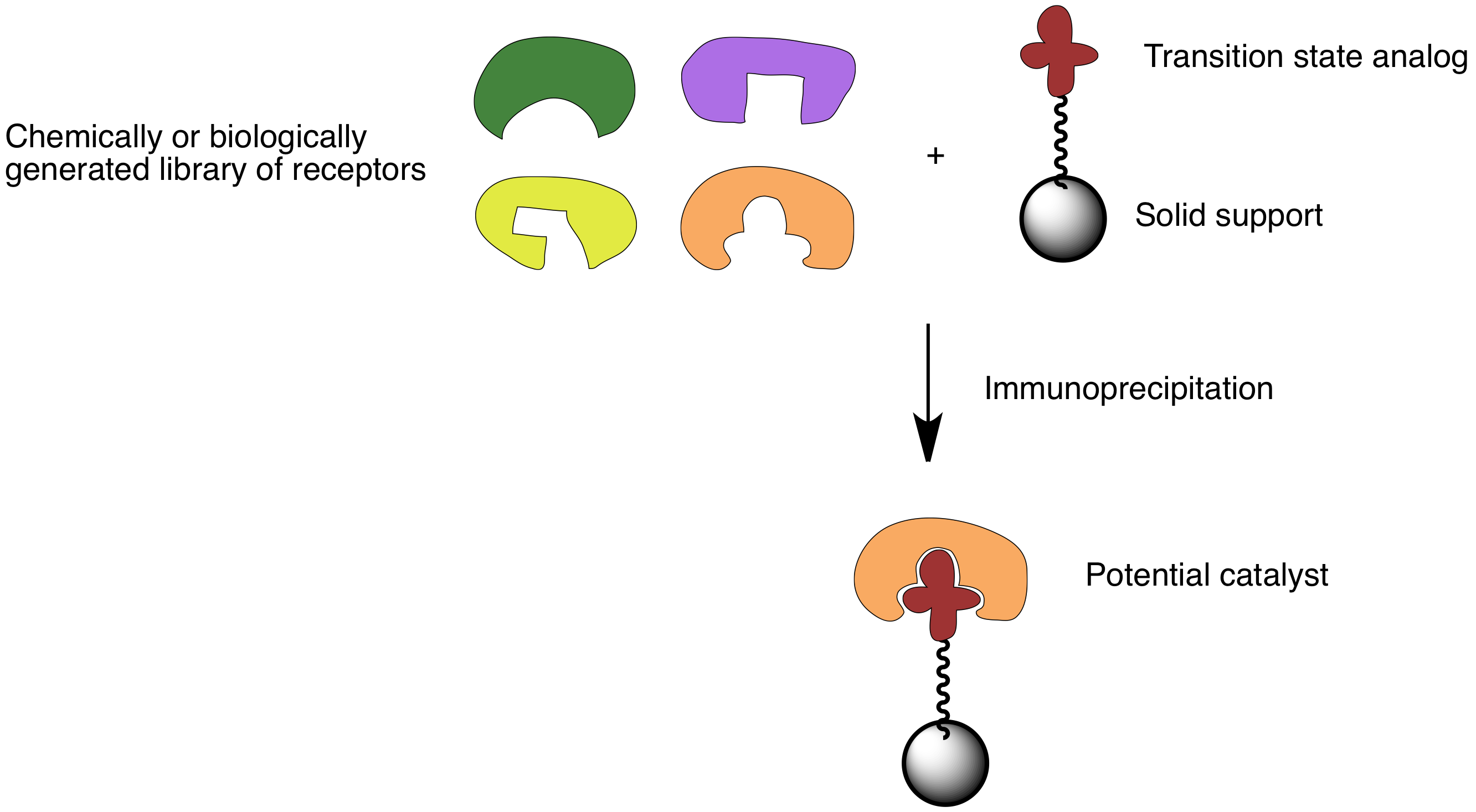
A diagram depicting a use of transition state analog selection approach to select a catalytic antibody.

Assuming that catalytic activity largely depends on the catalyst's affinity to the transition state, one could synthesise a transition state analog (TSA) – a structure that resembles the transition state of the reaction. Then one could link the TSA to a solid-support or identifiable tag and use that TSA to select an optimal catalyst from a mixture of many different potential catalysts generated chemically or biologically by a diversity oriented synthesis. This method allows quick screening of a library of diverse compounds. It does not require as much synthetic effort and it allows the study of various catalytic factors simultaneously. Hence the method could potentially yield an efficient catalyst that we could not have designed with our current knowledge. Many catalytic antibodies have been developed and studied using this approach.

=== Catalytic activity screening approach ===
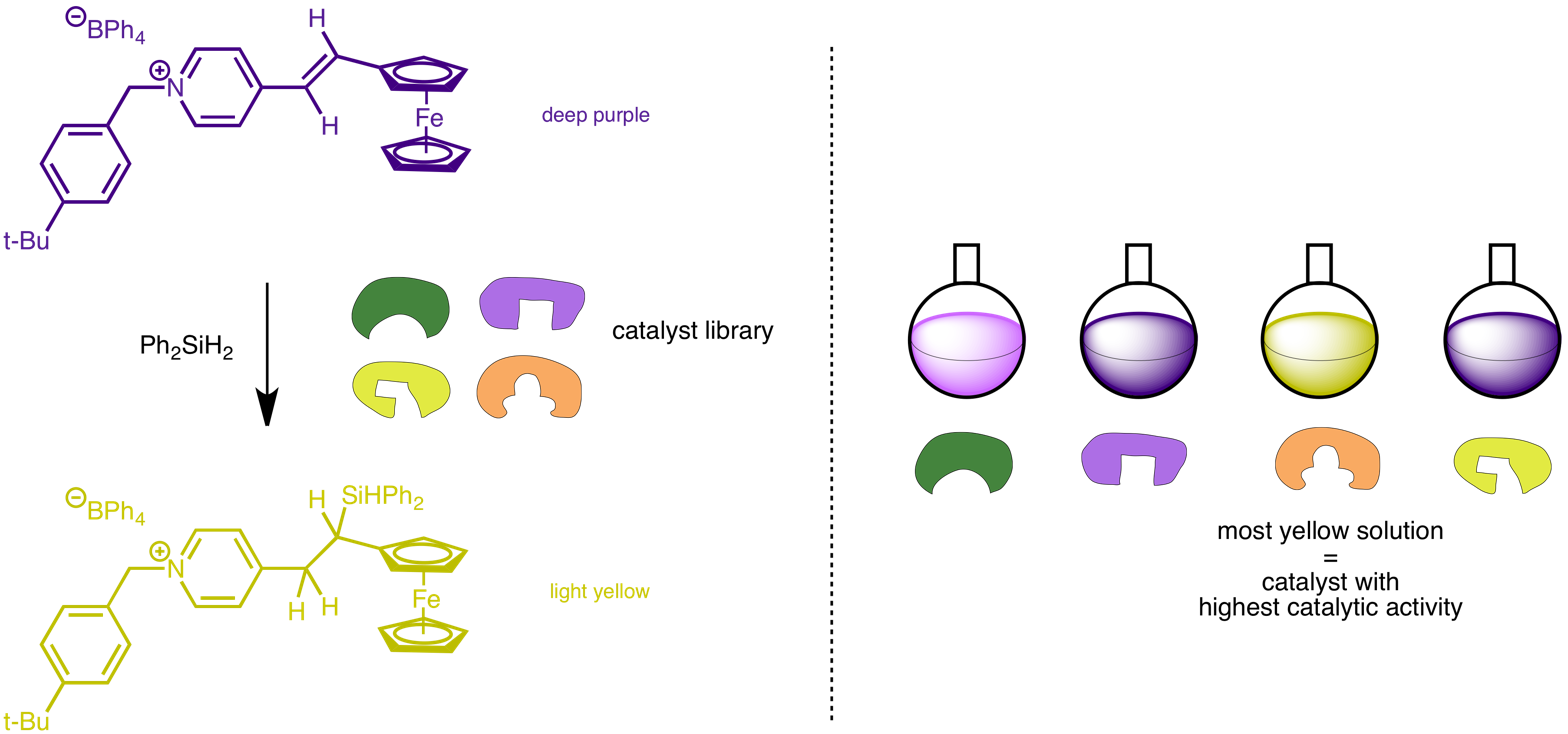
A diagram depicting a use of catalytic activity screening approach to screen a catalyst.

A problem with the transition state analogue selection approach above is that catalytic activity is not taken as a screening criterion. TSAs do not necessarily represent real transition states, and so a catalyst obtained from screening could just be the best receptor for a TSA but need not be the best catalyst. To circumvent this problem, catalytic activity needs to be measured directly and also quickly. To develop a high-throughput screen, substrates could be designed to change colour or release a fluorescent product upon reaction. For example, Crabtree and coworkers utilized this method in screening for a hydrosylation catalysts for alkene and imine. Unfortunately, the necessity for such substrates narrow down the range of reactions for study.

=== Dynamic combinatorial library approach ===
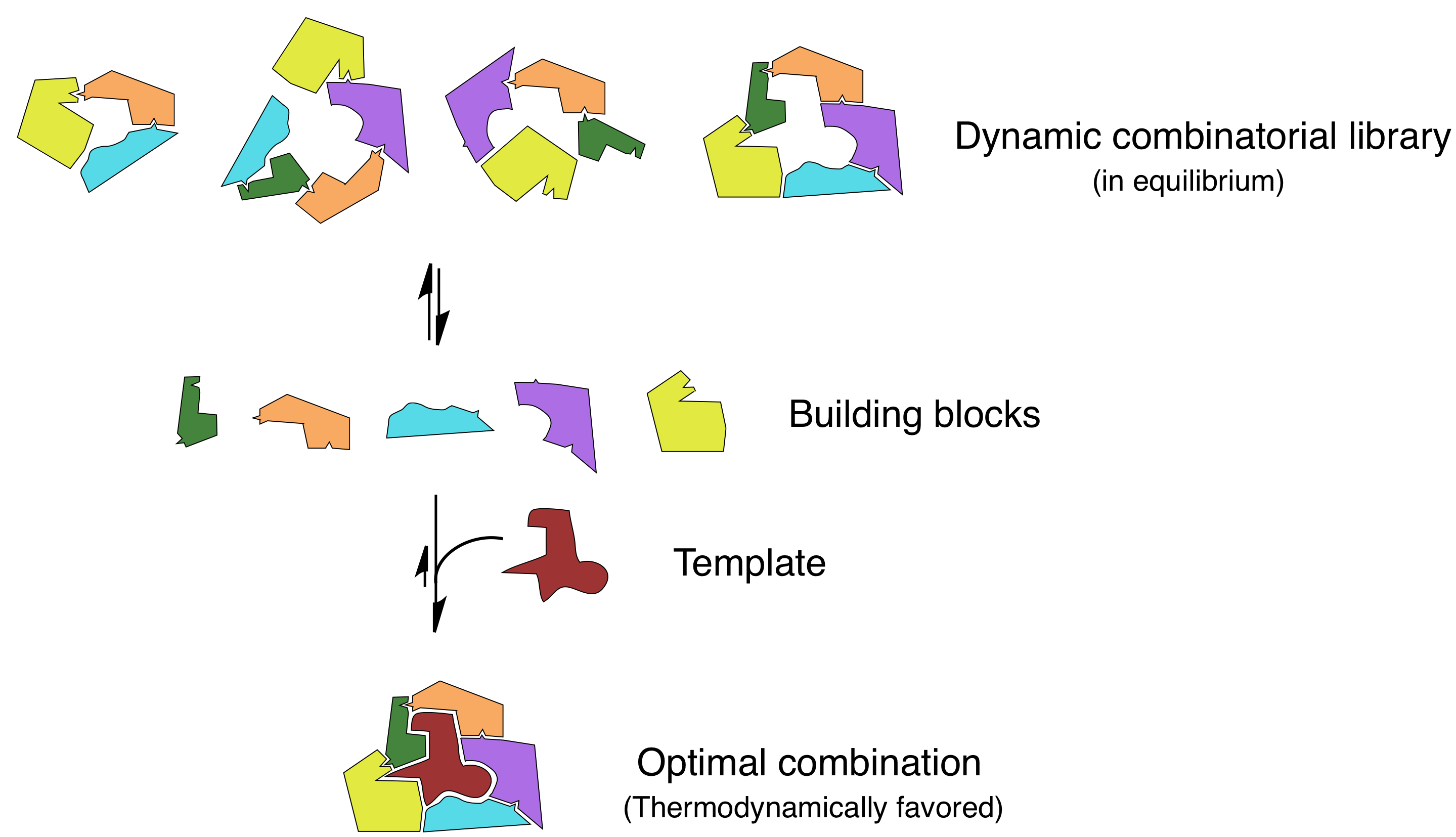
A diagram depicting a use of dynamic combinatorial library to select an optimal receptor.

In contrast to traditional combinatorial synthesis where a library of catalysts is first generated and later screened (as in the two above approaches), the dynamic combinatorial library approach utilises a mixture of multicomponent building blocks that reversibly form a library of catalysts. Without a template, the library consists of a roughly equal mixture of different combinations of building blocks. In the presence of a template which is either a starting material or a TSA, the combination that provides the best binding to the template is thermodynamically favourable, and thus that combination is more prevalent than other library members. The biased ratio of the desired catalyst to other combinatorial products could then be frozen by terminating the reversibility of the equilibrium by means such as change in temperature, pH, or radiation to yield the optimal catalyst. For example, Lehn et al. used this method to create a dynamic combinatorial library of imine inhibitors from a set of amines and a set of aldehydes. After some time, the equilibrium was terminated by an addition of NaBH_{3}CN to afford the desired catalyst.

== Examples of supramolecular catalysts ==
=== Pyruvate oxidase mimic ===
In nature, pyruvate oxidase employs two cofactors, thiamine pyrophosphate (ThDP) and flavin adenine dinucleotide (FAD), to catalyse the conversion of pyruvate to acetyl phosphate. First, ThDP mediates the decarboxylation of pyruvate and generates an active aldehyde as a product. The aldehyde is then oxidised by FAD and is subsequently attacked by phosphate to yield acetyl phosphate.

This biological system inspired the design of a supramolecular catalyst based on cyclophane. The catalyst has a thiazolium ion (the reactive part of ThDP) and flavin, the bare-bones core of FAD, in close proximity and near the substrate binding site. The catalytic cycle is almost the same as that in native pyruvate oxidase, except the substrate is an aromatic aldehyde rather than pyruvate. First, the catalyst binds the substrate within its cyclophane ring. Then, it uses the thiazolium ion to condense with the substrate, generating an active aldehyde. This aldehyde is oxidised by flavin and then attacked by methanol to yield a methyl ester.

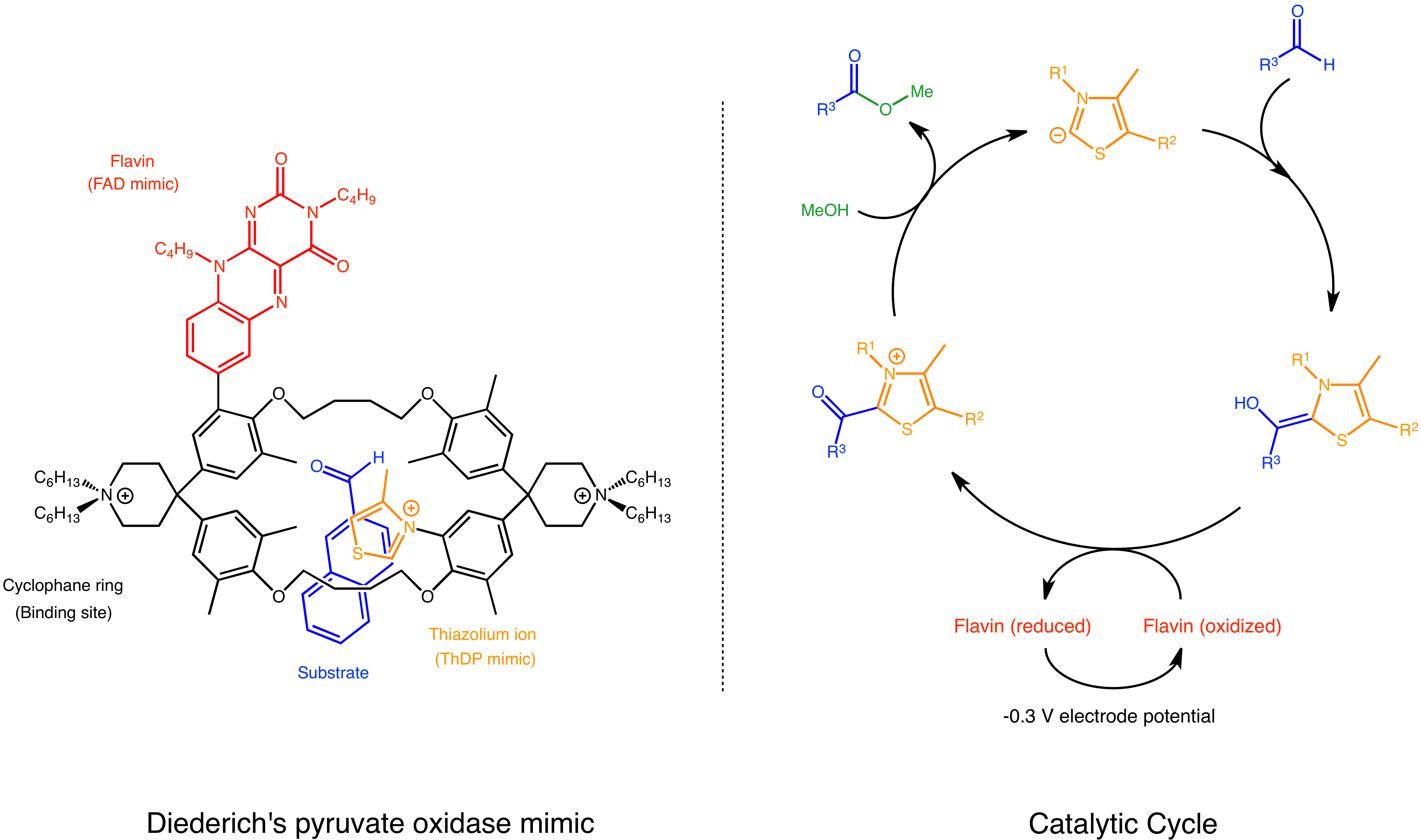
Pyruvate oxidase mimic developed by François Diederich. The cyclophane based catalyst utilizes ThDP mimic and FAD mimic to accelerate the oxidation of aldehyde into ester.

=== Successive epoxidation catalyst for alkene polymer ===
Processive enzymes are proteins that catalyse consecutive reactions without releasing their substrate. An example of a processive enzyme is RNA polymerase, which binds to a DNA strand and repeatedly catalyses nucleotide transfers, effectively synthesising the corresponding RNA strand.

An artificial processive enzyme has been designed in a form of a manganese porphyrin rotaxane that treads along a long polymeric alkene and catalyse multiple rounds of alkene epoxidation. The Mn(III) ion in the porphyrin is the molecule's catalytic center, capable of epoxidation in the presence of an oxygen donor and an activating ligand. With a small ligand such as pyridine that binds manganese from inside the cavity of the rotaxane, epoxidation happens outside the catalyst. With a large bulky ligand such as tert-butyl pyridine that does not fit inside the cavity however, epoxidation happens on the inside of the catalyst.

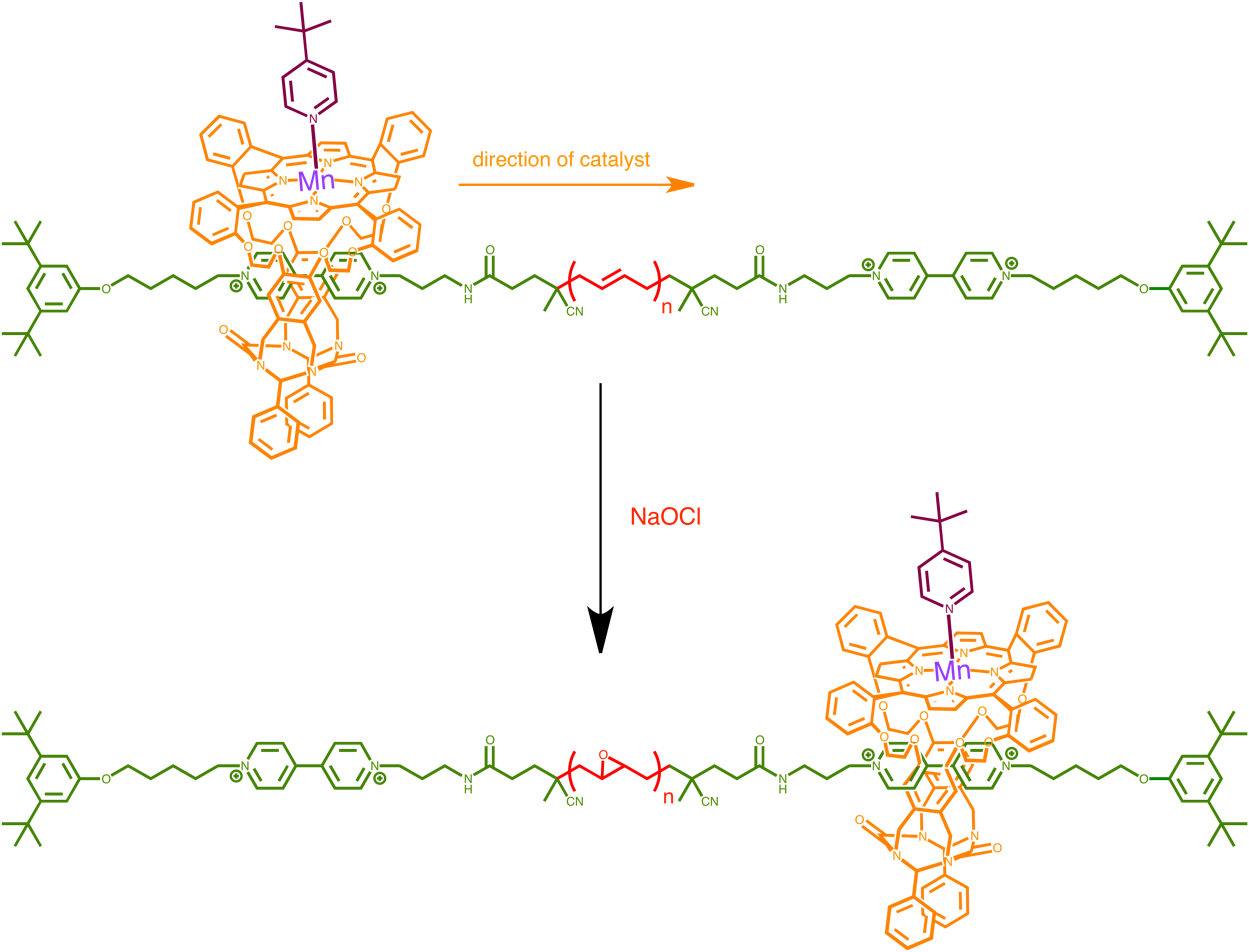
A manganese porphyrin catalyst developed by Nolte et al. capable of successive epoxidation of alkene polymer.

=== Nazarov cyclization catalyst ===
A self-assembled supramolecular host M_{4}L_{6} (4 gallium ions and 6 ligands for each complex) is capable of encapsulating and stabilising a cationic guests. This container assists in acid-catalyzed Nazarov cyclisation. The catalyst accelerates the reaction by over one million fold, making it the most efficient supramolecular catalyst to date. It was proposed that such a high catalytic activity does not arise just from the increased basicity of the encapsulated substrate but also from the constrictive binding that stabilize the transition state of the cyclisation. Unfortunately, this catalyst has a problem with product inhibition. To by pass that problem, the product of the cyclization reaction could be reacted with a dienophile transforming it into a Diels-Alder adduct that no longer fits inside the catalyst cavity.

In this case, the supramolecular host was initially designed to simply capture cationic guests. Almost a decade later, it was exploited as a catalyst for Nazarov cyclisation.

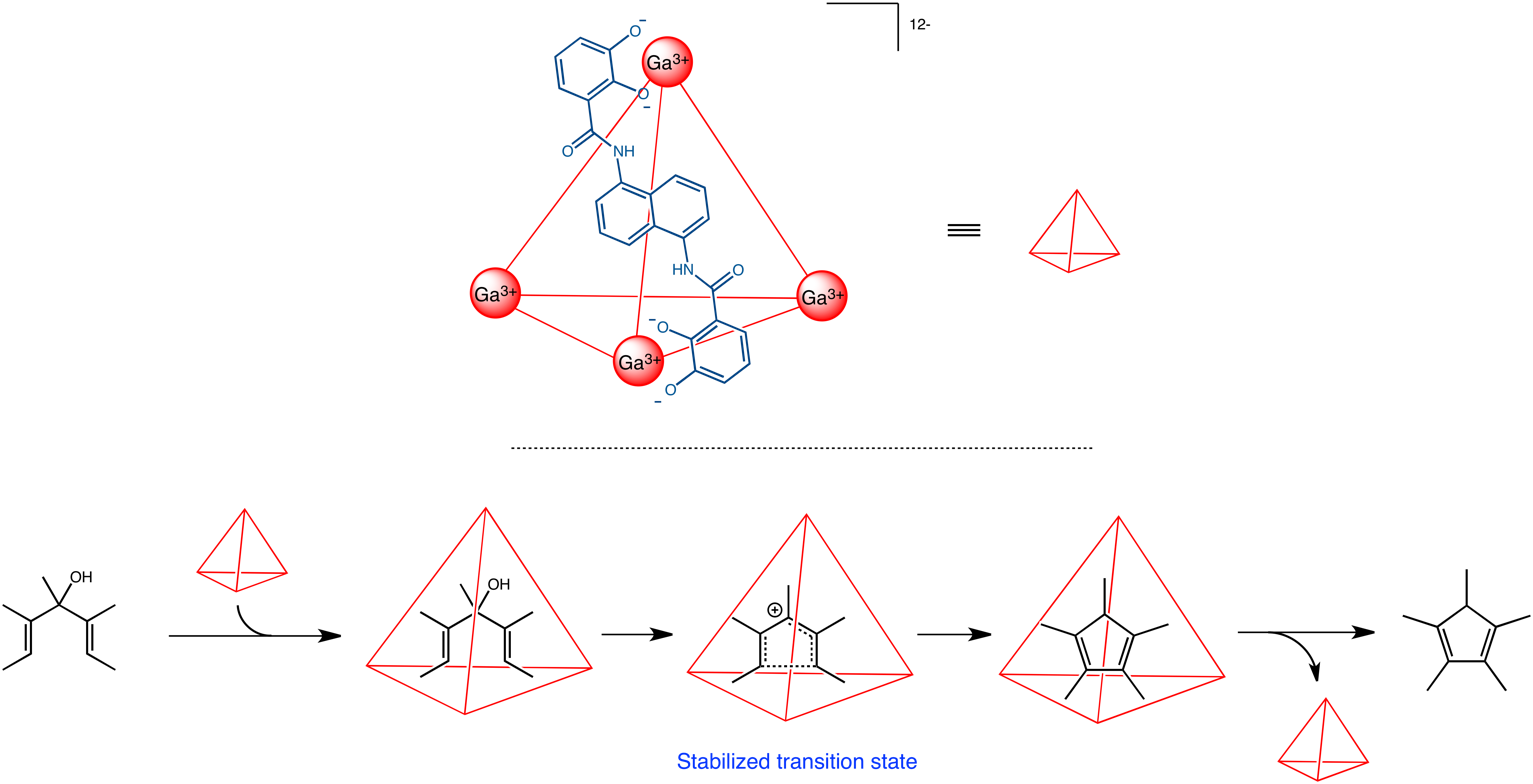
A self-assembled gallium catalyst accelerates Nazarov cyclisation by stabilising the cationic transition state. The structure drawn here shows only one ligand for the sake of simplicity, but there are six ligands on the edges of the tetrahedral complex.

=== Asymmetric [2+2] photoadditions ===
Fujita and coworkers discovered a self-assembled M_{6}L_{4} (6 palladium ions and 4 ligands in each complex) supramolecular container that could be enhanced into a chiral supramolecule by the addition of a peripheral chiral auxiliary. In this case, the auxiliary diethyldiaminocyclohexane does not directly activate the catalytic site but induces a slight deformation of the triazine plane to create chiral cavity inside the container molecule. This container could then be used to asymmetrically catalyze a [2+2] photochemical cycloaddition of maleimide and the inert aromatic compound fluoranthene, which previously have not been shown to undergo thermal or photochemical pericyclic reaction. The catalyst yields an enantiomeric excess of 40%.

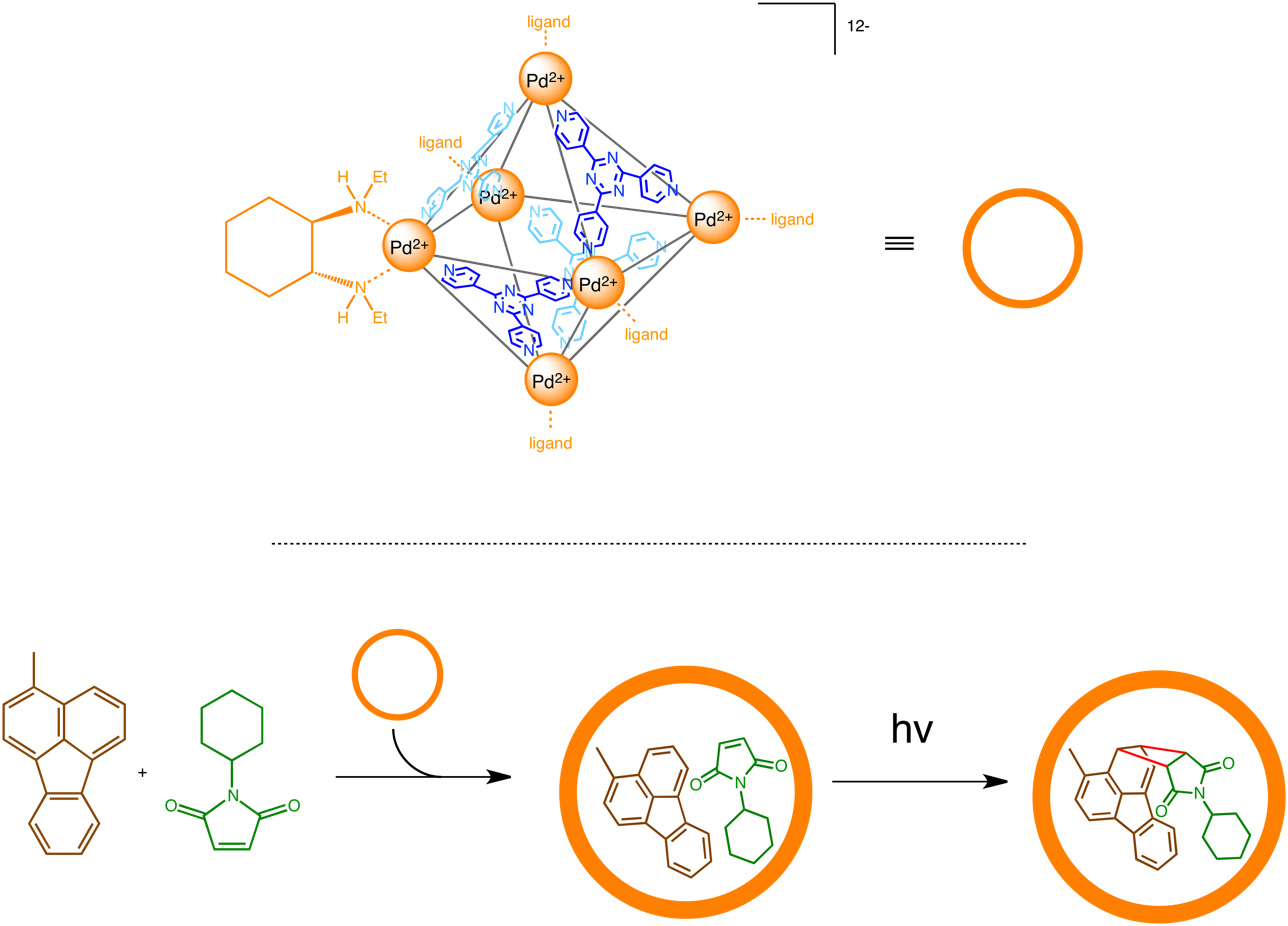
An asymmetric [2+2] photoaddition catalyst based on a tetrahedral palladium complex. The catalyst has chiral diamine auxiliaries that induces the asymmetric change in the cavity.

=== Asymmetric spiroacetalization ===
Enzymes have also inspired a set of confined Bronsted acids within an extremely sterically demanding chiral pocket based on a C_{2}-symmetric bis(binapthyl) imidodiphosphoric acid. Within the chiral microenvironment, the catalyst has a geometrically fixed bifunctional active site that activates both the electrophilic part and the nucleophilic part of a substrate. This catalyst enables stereoselective spiroacetal formation with high enantiomeric excess for a variety of substrates.

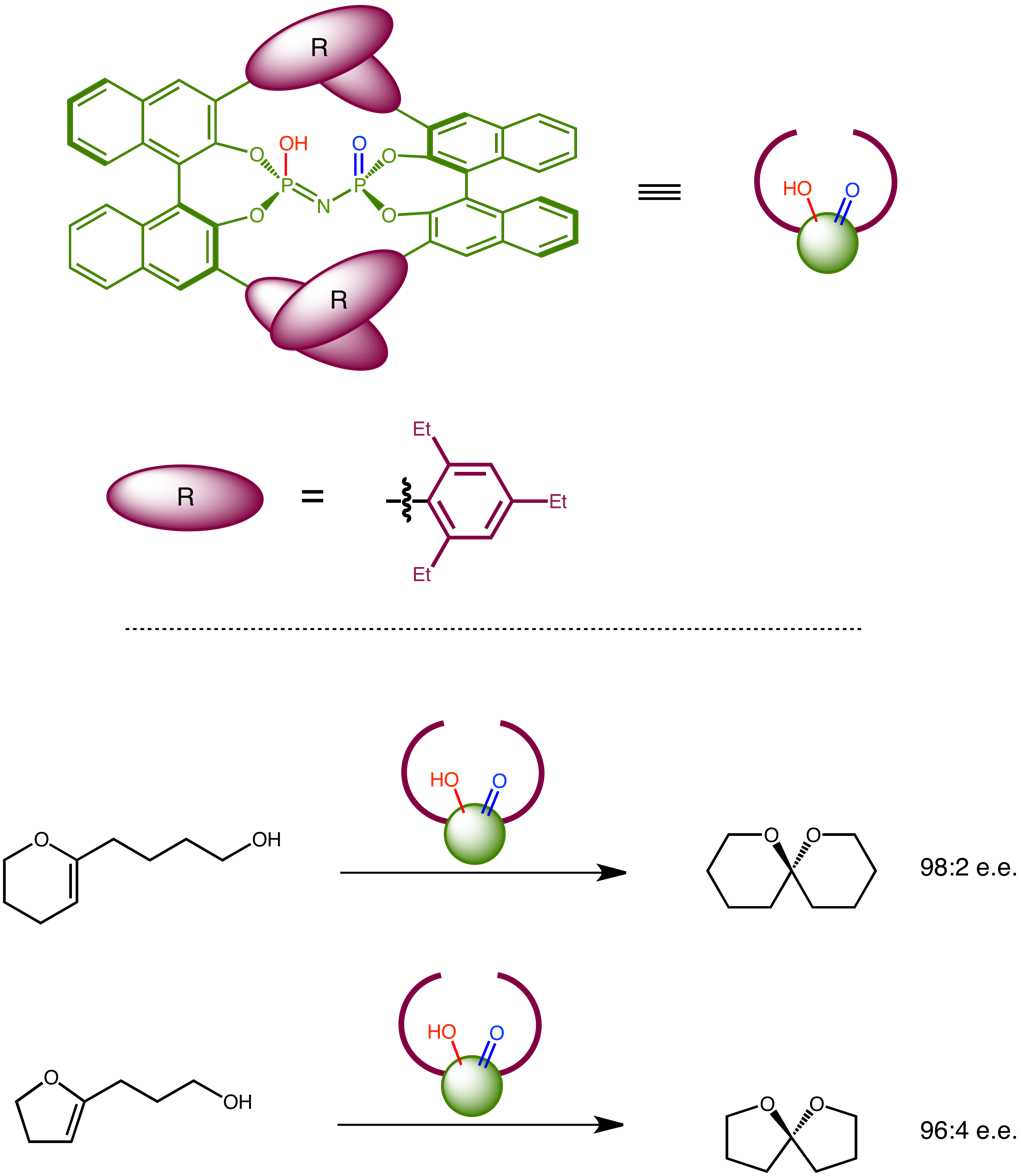
A chiral constrained Bronsted acid works as an asymmetric spiroacetalization catalyst.

== Supramolecular inhibitors ==
Supramolecular containers do not just have an application in catalysis but also in the opposite: namely, inhibition. A container molecule can encapsulate a guest molecule and subsequently render the guest unreactive. The mechanism of inhibition could either be that the substrate is completely isolated from the reagent, or that the container molecule destabilises the transition state of the reaction.

Nitschke and coworkers invented a self-assembled M_{4}L_{6} supramolecular host with a tetrahedral hydrophobic cavity that can encapsulate white phosphorus. Pyrophoric phosphorus, which self-combusts upon contact with air, is rendered air-stable within the cavity. Even though the hole in the cavity is large enough for an oxygen molecule to enter, the transition state of the combustion is too large to fit within the small cage cavity.

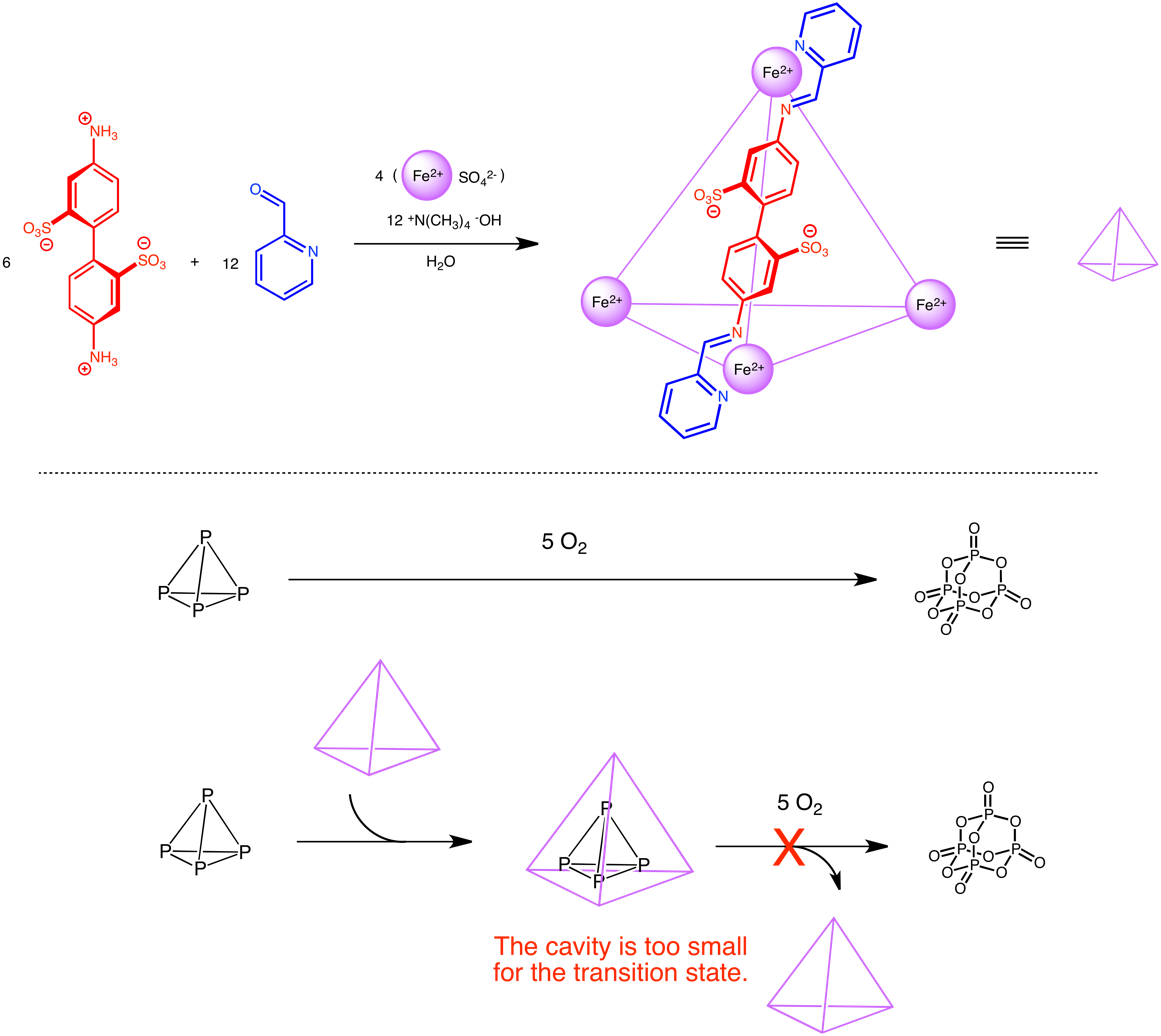
A subcomponent self-assembled tetrahedral capsule developed by Jonathan Nitschke renders pyrophoric white phosphorus air-stable. The structure drawn here shows only one ligand for the sake of simplicity, but there are six ligands on the edges of the tetrahedral complex.

== Problems and limitations ==
After many decades since its inception, supramolecular chemistry's application in practical catalysis remains elusive. Supramolecular catalysis has not yet made significant contribution in the area of industrial chemistry or synthetic methodology. A few problems with the field are given below.

=== Product inhibition ===
In many supramolecular catalytic systems designed to work with bimolecular addition reactions (such as the Diels-Alder reaction), the product of the reaction binds more strongly to the supramolecular host than the two substrates do, consequently leading to inhibition by the product. As a result, these catalysts have a turnover number of one and are not truly catalytic. A stoichiometric quantity of the catalysts is needed for full conversion.

=== Poor transition state stabilisation ===
Most supramolecular catalysts are developed from rigid building blocks, because rigid blocks are less complicated than flexible parts in constructing the desired shape and placing functional groups where the designer wants to place them. Due to the rigidity, however, a slight mismatch from the transition state inevitably leads to poor stabilisation and thus poor catalysis. In nature, enzymes are flexible and could change their structures to bind a transition state better than their native form.

=== Difficulty in synthesis and further adjustment ===
Syntheses of large complex catalysts is time and resource consuming. An unexpected deviation from the design could be disastrous. Once a catalyst is discovered, modification for further adjustment could be so synthetically challenging that it is easier to study the poor catalyst than to improve it.

== See also ==
- Supramolecular chemistry
- Host–guest chemistry
- Molecular encapsulation
- Artificial enzyme
- Asymmetric catalysis
