= Schiller layers =

Component in sedimentology

Schiller layers, also known as the iridescent layers, are a series of layers formed by sedimenting particles separated by approximately equal distances of the order of the wavelength of light. This gives rise to strong colors when observed in reflected light and the system is said to form iridescent layers or "Schiller layers".
