= BCL2L12 =

Protein-coding gene in the species Homo sapiens

Identifiers
- Aliases: BCL2L12, BCL2 like 12
- External IDs: OMIM: 610837; MGI: 1922986; GeneCards: BCL2L12

Gene location (Human)
| Chr. | Chromosome 19 (human) |
| Band | 19q13.33 | Start | 49,665,142 bp |
| Band | 19q13.33 | End | 49,673,916 bp |

Gene location (Mouse)
| Chr. | Chromosome 7 (mouse) |
| Band | 7|7 B3 | Start | 44,640,646 bp |
| Band | 7|7 B3 | End | 44,648,136 bp |
RNA expression pattern
| Bgee | Human / Mouse (ortholog); Top expressed in: gonad; gastrocnemius muscle; muscle of thigh; mucosa of transverse colon; granulocyte; testicle; oocyte; right lobe of liver; appendix; right ovary / Top expressed in: spermatocyte; hand; ventricular zone; yolk sac; maxillary prominence; mandibular prominence; ascending aorta; epiblast; foot; genital tubercle; More reference expression data |
| BioGPS | n/a |
Gene ontology
| Molecular function | p53 binding; protein binding |
| Cellular component | membrane; nucleus |
| Biological process | negative regulation of intrinsic apoptotic signaling pathway in response to DNA damage by p53 class mediator; positive regulation of transcription by RNA polymerase II; inhibition of cysteine-type endopeptidase activity involved in apoptotic process; negative regulation of cellular senescence; apoptotic process; regulation of apoptotic process |
Sources:Amigo / QuickGO
Orthologs
| Databases | NCBI: entry; OMA: entry |
| Species | Human | Mouse |
| Entrez | 83596 | 75736 |
| Ensembl | ENSG00000126453 | ENSMUSG00000003190 |
| UniProt | Q9HB09 | n/a |
| RefSeq (mRNA) | NM_001040668; NM_001282516; NM_001282517; NM_001282519; NM_001282520 NM_001282521; NM_138639; NM_001385706 | NM_029410 |
| RefSeq (protein) | NP_001035758; NP_001269445; NP_001269446; NP_001269448; NP_001269449 NP_001269450; NP_619580 | n/a |
| Location (UCSC) | Chr 19: 49.67 – 49.67 Mb | Chr 7: 44.64 – 44.65 Mb |
| PubMed search |
- Wikidata
| View/Edit Human | View/Edit Mouse |

Bcl-2-like protein 12 is a protein that in humans is encoded by the BCL2L12 gene.

The protein encoded by this gene belongs to the Bcl-2 protein family. Bcl-2 family members form hetero- or homodimers and act as anti- or pro-apoptotic regulators that are involved in a wide variety of cellular activities. This protein contains a Bcl-2 homology domain 2 (BH2). The function of this gene has not yet been determined. Two alternatively spliced transcript variants of this gene encoding distinct isoforms have been reported.

Bcl2L12 expression is upregulated in most human glioblastomas. Expression of Bcl2L12 results in resistance to apoptosis. Bcl2L12 directly neutralizes caspase-7 (CASP7) and indirectly neutralizes caspase-3 (CASP3) by an indirect mechanism. Both caspase enzymes are known to play essential roles in the execution phase of apoptosis.
