= Chad Mirkin =

American chemist

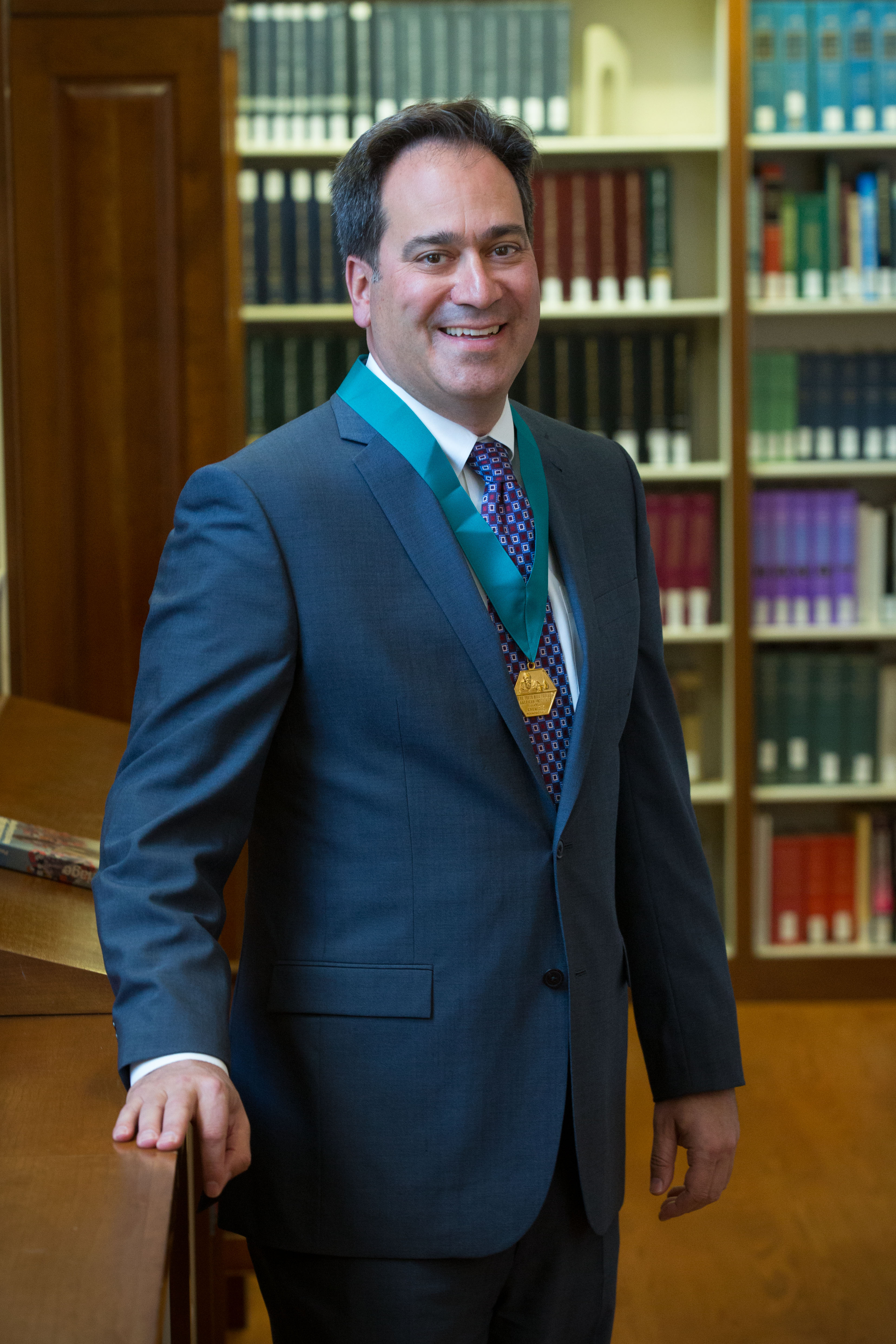
- Chad Mirkin with AIC Gold Medal, 2016
- Born: November 23, 1963 (age 62); Phoenix, Arizona, U.S.
- Education: Dickinson College, Pennsylvania State University
- Awards: Lemelson-MIT Prize, 2009; Linus Pauling Award, 2013; Raymond and Beverly Sackler Prize in Convergence Research, 2015; Dan David Prize, 2016; Wilhelm Exner Medal, 2017; William H. Nichols Medal Award, 2017; Ira Remsen Award, 2018; Kabiller Prize, 2019; Perkin Medal, 2019; AAAS Philip Hauge Abelson Prize, 2020; King Faisal Prize, 2023; Kavli Prize, 2024; Harvey Prize, 2025; Priestley Medal, 2027
- Scientific career
- Fields: Chemistry, Materials science, and Nanotechnology
- Workplaces: Northwestern University
- Notable students: Nathan C. Gianneschi; Xiaogang Liu; Robert Macfarlane; Jill Millstone; So-Jung Park

External videos
- "Nanotechnology: Moving Beyond Small Thinking", Chad Mirkin, Air Force Office of Scientific Research (AFOSR)

Chad Alexander Mirkin (born November 23, 1963) is an American chemist. He is the George B. Rathmann professor of chemistry, professor of medicine, professor of materials science and engineering, professor of biomedical engineering, and professor of chemical and biological engineering, and director of the International Institute for Nanotechnology and Center for Nanofabrication and Molecular Self-Assembly at Northwestern University.

Mirkin is known for his development of nanoparticle-based biodetection schemes, the invention of dip-pen nanolithography (recognized by National Geographic as one of the top 100 scientific discoveries that changed the world), and contributions to supramolecular chemistry, nanoelectronics, and nanooptics. In 2010, he was listed as the most cited chemist in the world over the last decade in terms of total citations, the second highest most cited chemist in terms of impact factor, and the top most cited nanomedicine researcher.

== Early life and education ==
Mirkin was born November 23, 1963, in Phoenix, Arizona. He received his B.S. degree from Dickinson College in 1986 and his PhD from Penn State University in 1989 under the direction of Professor Gregory L. Geoffroy. He was a NSF postdoctoral research fellow at Massachusetts Institute of Technology where he worked with Professor Mark S. Wrighton on microelectrode devices for electrocatalysis. He became a professor at Northwestern University in 1991.

== Research ==
The focus of Mirkin's research is on developing methods for controlling the architecture of molecules and materials on the 1 – 100 nm length scale and utilizing such structures in the development of analytical tools that can be used in the areas of chemical and biological sensing, lithography, catalysis, and optics. Mirkin has pioneered the use of DNA and nanoparticles as synthons in materials science and the development of nanoparticle-based biodiagnostics.

A common strategy used by Mirkin's group is the use of the unique properties of spherical nucleic acids (SNAs), spherical arrangements of nucleic acids with or without organic or inorganic nanoparticle cores, to enable the synthesis of novel materials and colloidal crystals, the development of high sensitivity probes for chemical and medical diagnostic purposes, and single-entity structures capable of intracellular gene regulation. His 1996 work with SNA-gold nanoparticle conjugates introduced the concept of a nanoparticle as an atom and nucleic acids as bonds, and it laid the ground work for the fields of colloidal crystal engineering with DNA and molecular diagnostics based upon well-defined nanoparticle and nanocrystal bioconjugates. SNAs are the cornerstone of Luminex's FDA-cleared Verigene system (now used in over half of the world's top hospitals), EMD Millipore's SmartFlare platform (licensed to AuraSense, Inc. and Holden Pharma), and seven drugs in human clinical trials. In addition, his inventions of DPN, Polymer Pen Lithography (PPL), and Beam Pen Lithography (BPL) are the basis for the TERA-fab M and E series commercial patterning tools, known as desktop fabs (TERA-print, LLC).

He has published over 955 manuscripts, with a Google Scholar H-index of 210, and has over 1,400 patents and patent applications.

Mirkin has been elected into all three branches of the National Academies of Sciences, Engineering, and Medicine, the 10th person so honored. He has served on several editorial advisory boards, including ACS Nano, the Journal of the American Chemical Society and Angewandte Chemie. He is the founding editor of the nanotechnology journal Small, and he served for eight years as an associate editor of the Journal of the American Chemical Society. Mirkin is a co-founder of multiple companies, including NanoInk, Nanosphere (acquired by Luminex for $83M in 2016), Azul 3D, TERA-print, Exicure, and Stoicheia.

Information scientists at CAS, a division of the American Chemical Society, singled out Mirkin and his contributions to supramolecular chemistry and nanomaterials in an article about potential future winners of the Nobel Prize in Chemistry, saying that “Overall, Mirkin’s work set up the foundation of modern nanotechnology and development of related diagnostic, therapeutic, and material applications.”

== Science policy ==
In addition to his academic and research work, Mirkin has been involved in shaping science policy decisions. From 2009 to 2017 Mirkin was appointed to President Barack Obama's President's Council of Advisors on Science and Technology (PCAST). He co-chaired the PCAST report titled, "Engage to Excel," focusing on teaching and engagement issues involving students who are in their first two years of undergraduate study at R-1, 2 and 4-year institutions, and community colleges.

== Awards and honors ==
- 2027 – Priestley Medal
- 2025 – Harvey Prize
- 2024 – Kavli Prize in Nanoscience
- 2024 – Guggenheim Fellow
- 2023 – Materials Today Innovation Award
- 2023 – King Faisal Prize
- 2022 – MRS Medal
- 2022 – John P. McGovern Science and Society Award
- 2022 – Faraday Medal
- 2022 – UNESCO-Equatorial Guinea International Prize for Research in the Life Sciences
- 2021 – De Gennes Prize (Royal Society of Chemistry)
- 2021 – Acta Biomaterialia Gold Medal
- 2021 – G.M. Kosolapoff Award
- 2020 – AAAS Philip Hauge Abelson Prize
- 2019 – Kabiller Prize in Nanoscience and Nanomedicine
- 2019 – Perkin Medal
- 2019 – Netherlands Award for Supramolecular Chemistry
- 2018 – Theodore William Richards Medal
- 2018 – Ira Remsen Award
- 2018 – Chinese Friendship Award
- 2018 – Harrison Howe Award
- 2018 – Nano Research Award
- 2017 – William H. Nichols Medal Award
- 2016 – Dickson Prize
- 2016 – Rusnano Prize
- 2016 – Dan David Prize
- 2016 – American Institute of Chemists Gold Medal
- 2015 – American Institute for Medical and Biological Engineering Fellow
- 2015 – Raymond and Beverly Sackler Prize in Convergence Research of the National Academy of Sciences
- 2015 – Royal Society of Chemistry Centenary Prize
- 2014 – Vittorio de Nora Award, Electrochemical Society
- 2014 – Honorary Professor, Nanjing Tech University
- 2013 – Chemistry World Entrepreneur of the Year
- 2013 – Linus Pauling Award
- 2012 – Lee Kuan Yew Distinguished Visitor to Singapore
- 2012 – Honorary Doctorate of Engineering, Nanyang Technological University, Singapore
- 2012 – American Chemical Society Award for Creative Invention
- 2011 – Member of the American Academy of Arts and Sciences
- 2010 – Member of the Institute of Medicine
- 2010 – Member of the National Academy of Sciences
- 2009 – Member of the National Academy of Engineering
- 2009 – Lemelson-MIT Prize
- 2007 – Alumni Fellow, Pennsylvania State University
- 2004 – NIH Director's Pioneer Award
- 2004 – Outstanding Science Alumni Award, Pennsylvania State University
- 2004 – Honorary Degree, Dickinson College, Carlisle, PA
- 2004 – American Chemical Society Nobel Laureate Signature Award
- 2003 – Raymond and Beverly Sackler Prize
- 2002 – Feynman Prize
- 2001 – Leo Hendrik Baekeland Award
- 2000 – Appointed to chair endowed by George B. Rathmann
- 1999 – ACS Award in Pure Chemistry
- 1992 – Beckman Young Investigators Award
