= ACS Nano =

- Discipline: Nanoscience, Nanotechnology
- Language: English
- Edited by: Xiaodong Chen

Publication details
- History: 2007–present
- Publisher: American Chemical Society (United States)
- Frequency: Monthly
- Impact factor: 15.8 (2023)

Standard abbreviations
- ISO 4: ACS Nano

Indexing
- CODEN: ANCAC3
- ISSN: 1936-0851 (print); 1936-086X (web)

Links
- Journal homepage

ACS Nano is a monthly, peer-reviewed, scientific journal, first published in August 2007 by the American Chemical Society with the current impact factor 15.8. The current editor in chief is Xiaodong Chen (Nanyang Technological University). The journal publishes original research articles, reviews, perspectives, interviews with distinguished researchers, and views on the future of nanoscience and nanotechnology.

== Scope ==
The focus of ACS Nano is synthesis, assembly, characterization, theory, and simulation of nanostructures, nanotechnology, nanofabrication, self assembly, nanoscience methodology, and nanotechnology methodology. The focus also includes nanoscience and nanotechnology research – the scope of which is chemistry, biology, materials science, physics, and engineering.

== Abstracting and indexing ==
ACS Nano is indexed in the following databases:

- Chemical Abstracts Service – CASSI
- Chemistry Citation Index
- Current Contents – Physical, Chemical & Earth Sciences
- Materials Science Citation Index
- Science Citation Index
- Scopus
- MEDLINE/PubMed
- Nature Index
