= Polyvalency (chemistry) =

Property of chemical species that can form multiple bonds

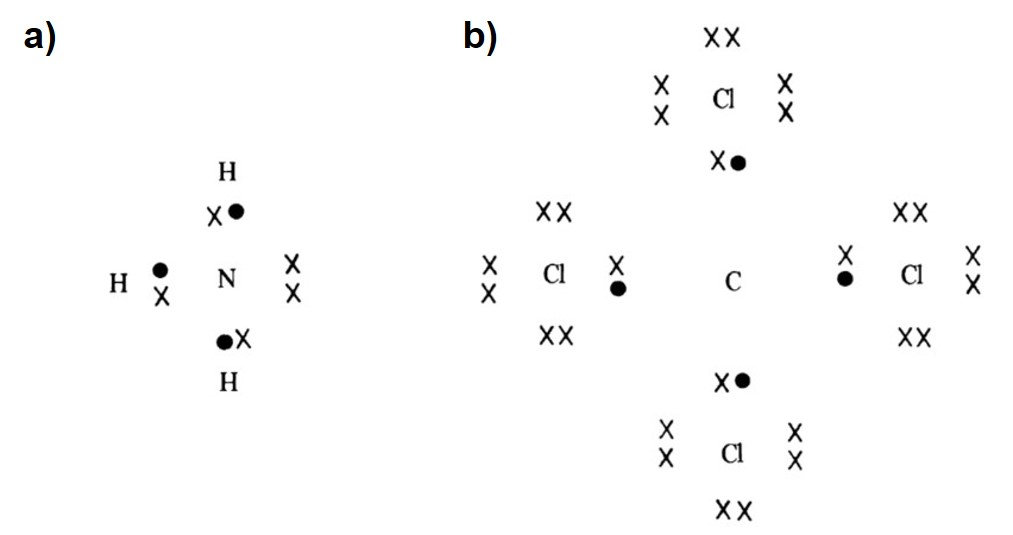
Fig. 1. Electron sharing in multivalent atomic binding. The dots and crosses represent the outer electrons of the two different species in each molecule. In ammonia (a), N is connected to three H atoms and is trivalent. In carbon tetrachloride (b), C is connected to four Cl atoms and is tetravalent.

In chemistry, polyvalency (or polyvalence, multivalency) is the property of molecules and larger species, such as antibodies, medical drugs, and even nanoparticles surface-functionalized with ligands, like spherical nucleic acids, that exhibit more than one supramolecular interaction. For the number of chemical bonds of atoms, the term "valence" is used (Fig. 1). For both atoms and larger species, the number of bonds may be specified: divalent species can form two bonds; a trivalent species can form three bonds; and so on.

Species that have polyvalency usually show enhanced or cooperative binding compared to their monovalent counterparts. Nanoparticles with multiple nucleic acid strands on their surfaces (e.g., DNA) can form multiple bonds with one another by DNA hybridization to form hierarchical assemblies, some of which are highly crystalline in nature.
