= List of media awards =

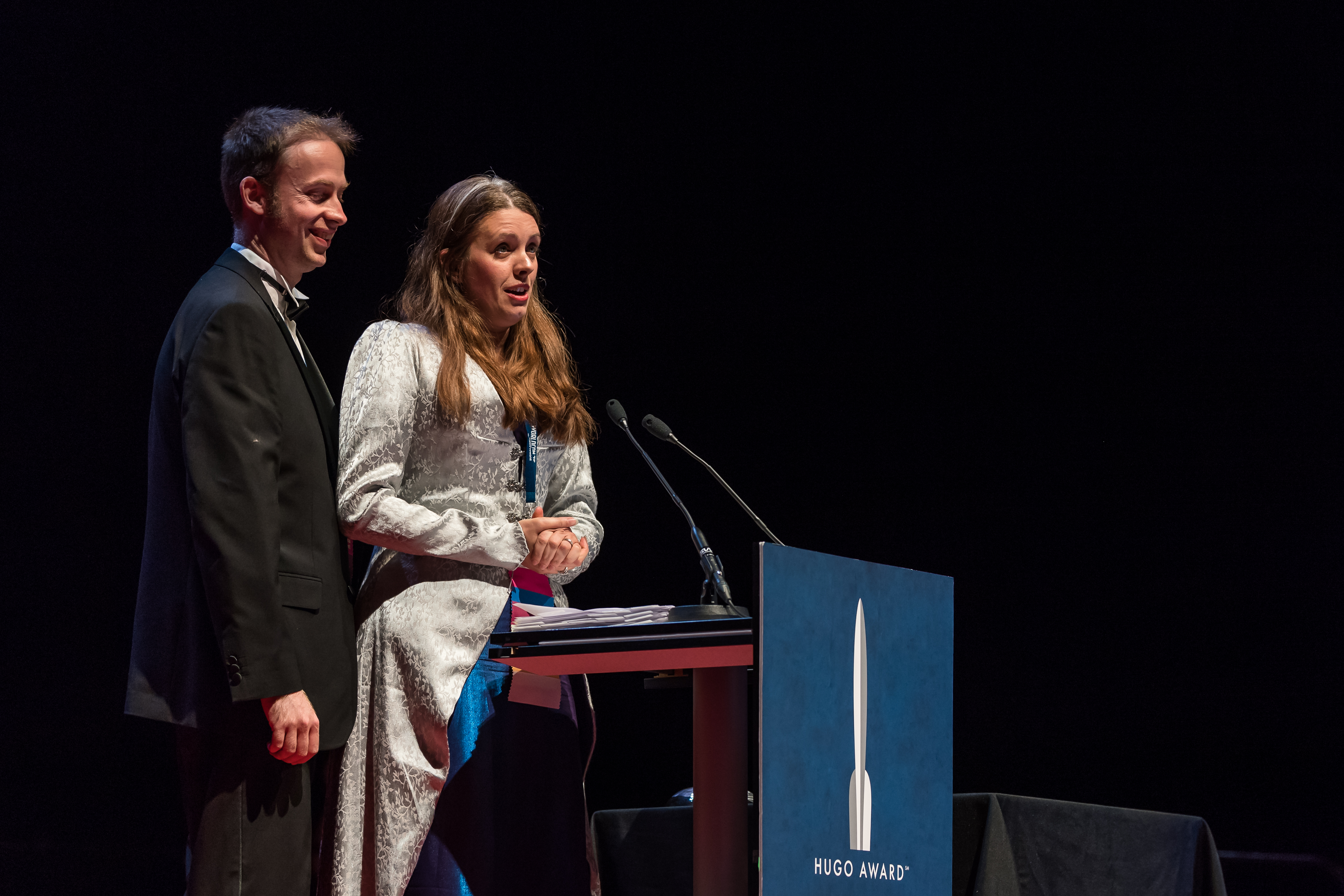
Peter and Emma Newman accepting the 2017 Hugo Award for Best Fancast

This list of media awards is an index to articles about awards related to the media. It includes general media awards and awards for magazines, blogs, podcasting, student and educational media and women in media It excludes awards that are covered by the following lists:

- Animation
- Children's media
- Comics
- Film
- Journalism
- Literary
- Music
- Photography
- Radio
- Television
- Web
- Writing

== General ==
Country	Award	Venue / sponsor	Notes
United States	Adult Video News Awards	Adult Video News	Excellence in performance and production of sexually explicit video & film media.
United Kingdom	AIB Media Excellence Awards	Association for International Broadcasting	Excellence in the international broadcasting industry
United States	Al Neuharth Award for Excellence in the Media	Freedom Forum, University of South Dakota	Award presented annually to a leading figure in the media.
Austria	Amadeus Austrian Music Awards	International Federation of the Phonographic Industry (Austria)	Excellence in the Austrian music industry
United States	American Video Awards	American Video Association	Awards for music videos
Indonesia	Anugerah Musik Indonesia	Anugerah Musik Indonesia	Outstanding achievements in the Indonesian music industry
United States	Artios Award for Outstanding Achievement in Casting – Big Budget Feature (Drama)	Casting Society of America	Casting directors of higher-budgeted, in comparison to independently-backed, films
United States	Artios Award for Outstanding Achievement in Comedy Pilot Casting	Casting Society of America	Casting directors for their work on television pilot episodes, or a series first episode
United States	Billboard Live Music Awards	Billboard magazine	Top international live entertainment industry artists and professionals
Germany	Bravo Otto	Bravo magazine	Excellence of performers in film, television and music
United Kingdom	Britannia Awards	British Academy of Film and Television Arts	Individuals and companies who have dedicated their careers or corporate missions to advancing the art-forms of the moving image
United Kingdom	British Inspiration Awards	David Yarnton (Nintendo)	Achievement in the creative industries of the United Kingdom
Europe	Civis Media Prize	CIVIS Media Foundation	Radio and television broadcasting projects that promote peaceful coexistence within the European immigration community
Argentina	Clarín Awards	Clarín newspaper	Argentine achievements in entertainment, sports, literature, and advertising
United Kingdom	Conch awards	UK Screen Alliance	Outstanding contributions in the field of audio post production
United States	Eliot-Pearson Awards	Tufts University	Outstanding contributions in the field of children’s media
United Kingdom	EMMA Awards	Ethnic Multicultural Media Academy	Media excellence achieved by the multicultural community
Germany	European Newspaper Award	Norbert Küpper	Newspapers: various categories
United States	Gabriel Award	Catholic Press Association	Outstanding artistic achievement ... which entertains and enriches with a true vision of humanity
Spain	Gat Perich Awards	Gat Perich	Veteran cartoonists and humorists who have become a benchmark for the new generations
Philippines	Gawad Plaridel	University of the Philippines	Outstanding media practitioners
United States	GLAAD Media Award	GLAAD	Media for their representations of the lesbian, gay, bisexual and transgender (LGBT) community and the issues that affect their lives
Japan	Golden Arrow Award	Japan Magazine Publishers Association	Excellence in domestic media, such as in film, television, and music
Singapore	Golden Mic Awards	Mediacorp	Excellence of presenters and producers in MediaCorp Radio
United States	Grammy Award	The Recording Academy	Achievements in the music industry
United States	Herblock Prize	Library of Congress	Editorial cartooning as an essential tool for preserving the rights of the American people through freedom of speech and the right of expression
South Korea	Ho-Am Prize in Mass Communication	Ho-Am Prize	People or groups who furthered mass media or communications in a way which was to the enhancement of the welfare of mankind
United States	Hollywood Music in Media Awards	Hollywood Music in Media Awards	Original music (Song and Score) in all visual media from around the globe including film, TV, video games, trailers, commercial advertisements, documentaries and special programs
Germany	Innovationspreis des Beauftragten für Kultur und Medien	German government	Individuals or institutions in the film industry that demonstrated innovation
United States	International Editor of the Year Award	World Press Review	Journalists and press editors outside the United States
United States	International Rock Awards	American Broadcasting Company	Top musicians in the rock music genre
United Kingdom	London International Awards	London International Awards	Excellence in advertising, digital media, production, design, music & sound and branded entertainment
India	Manthan Award	Digital Empowerment Foundation	Exceptional digital content creation
Brazil	Multishow Brazilian Music Award	Multishow	Best in music, pop culture and online culture
Belgium	Music Industry Awards	Music Centre Flanders	Outstanding achievements in Flemish music industry
United States	NAACP Image Awards	NAACP	Outstanding performances in film, television, music, and literature
New Zealand	Newspaper Publishers' Association awards	Newspaper Publishers’ Association	Excellence in the news print media
United States	Nickelodeon Kids' Choice Awards	Nickelodeon	Television, movie, and music acts as voted by viewers worldwide of Nickelodeon networks
Nigeria	Nigerian Broadcasters Merit Awards	Nigerian Broadcasters Merit Awards	Excellence of professionals in the African/Nigerian broadcast industry
United States	Oppenheim Toy Portfolio Award	Oppenheim Toy Portfolio	Consumer review of children's media and toys
Austria	Prix Ars Electronica	Ars Electronica	Electronic and interactive art, computer animation, digital culture, and music
United States	Reference and User Services Association awards	American Library Association	Academic reference books or media
United States	Rock Music Awards	Rock Music Awards	Best in rock music
United States	Signal Awards	Signal Awards	Best podcasts in many categories
United States	Stellar Awards	SAGMA	Achievements in the gospel music industry
United States	TEC Awards	TEC Foundation	Achievements of audio professionals
Philipplines	The EDDYS	Society of Philippine Entertainment Editors	Craftsmen, actors, writers, directors, workers, and producers in the Philippine film industry
United Kingdom	UK Theatre Awards	UK Theatre	Creative excellence and outstanding work in regional theatre throughout England, Scotland, Wales and Northern Ireland
Netherlands	Zilveren Nipkowschijf	Zilveren Nipkowschijf	Television award

== Magazines ==
Magazine media awards include awards given by magazines for other media, and awards for magazines.

Country	Award	Venue / sponsor	Notes
Brazil	BreakTudo Awards	BreakTudo / Revotec	Achievements in music, film, television, Brazilian internet and more
Brazil	Capricho Awards de Gato Nacional	Capricho	Film, TV, music etc.
Sweden	Gaygalan Awards	QX magazine	LGBT achievements
United States	Hugo Award for Best Fanzine	Worldcon (World Science Fiction Society)	Non professionally edited magazines, or "fanzines", related to science fiction or fantasy
United States	Hugo Award for Best Professional Magazine	Worldcon (World Science Fiction Society)	Professionally edited magazines related to science fiction or fantasy
United States	Hugo Award for Best Semiprozine	Worldcon (World Science Fiction Society)	Semi-professionally-edited magazines related to science fiction or fantasy
Italy	Latin Music Italian Awards	Latin Music Official	Promote and recognize Latin music in Italy and Europe
Brazil	MTV Millennial Awards Brazil	MTV pay TV channel	Music, television and internet artists
United Kingdom	Magazine Design and Journalism Awards	Press Gazette	Design and journalism across all magazine sectors – consumer, B2B and customer
United States	National Magazine Awards	American Society of Magazine Editors, Columbia University Graduate School of Journalism	Excellence in the magazine industry
Canada	National Media Awards	National Media Awards Foundation	Excellence in the content and creation of Canadian magazines and Canadian digital publishing
United States	PEN/Nora Magid Award for Magazine Editing	PEN America	Magazine editor with high literary standards and taste, who has significantly contributed to the excellence of their publication throughout their career.
Brazil	Prêmio Jovem Brasileiro	AgenciaZapping / InstitutoSou+Jovem	Young people who are featured in music, television, film, sports, environment and Brazilian internet
United States	StarShine Music Awards	StarShine Magazine (Sandy Lo Media & Marketing)	Best artists and releases of the year (2003 - 2010)

== Blog and podcasting ==
=== Blog ===
Country	Award	Awarded	Venue / sponsor	Notes
United States	Black Weblog Awards	2005–2016		Bloggers of African-American descent for their contributions in blogging, video blogging, and podcasting
Germany	The BOBs (weblog award)	2005–2016	Deutsche Welle	Freedom of information and the press around the world
United States	Crunchies	2007–2017	TechCrunch	Silicon Valley companies and venture capitalists (2007 to 2017)
United States (awarded internationally)	Shorty Awards	2009–present	Real Time Academy	People and organizations that produce real-time short form content across Twitter, Facebook, YouTube, Instagram, TikTok, Twitch and the rest of the social web
United Kingdom	Slugger O’Toole Political Awards	2008–2009	Mick Fealty	Good examples of democratic practice (Northern Ireland)
United States	Streamy Awards	2009–present	Tubefilter, Dick Clark Productions	Achievement in web television production
United States (awarded internationally)	Webby Award	1996–present	International Academy of Digital Arts and Sciences	Websites, advertising and media, online film and video, mobile sites and apps, and social
United States	The Weblog Awards (Bloggies)	2001–2015	Nikolai Nolan	Blog awards, with winners determined through internet voting by the public
United States	The Weblog Awards (Wizbang)	2003–2008	Kevin Aylward's Wizbang LLC	Blog awards, with winners determined through internet voting by the public
United States	YouTube Awards	2007–2008	YouTube	Best user-generated videos of the year

=== Podcasting ===
Country	Award	Awarded	Venue / sponsor	Notes
United States	Ambies	2021–present	Podcast Academy	Awards for Excellence in Audio
United Kingdom	British Fantasy Award	2018–present	British Fantasy Society	Audio award introduced in 2018 includes podcasts
United Kingdom	British Podcast Awards	2017–present		Independent judges from the audio and media industry
United States	Hugo Award for Best Fancast	2012–present	Hugo Award	Best non-professional science fiction or fantasy video or audio series
United States	Parsec Awards	2006–2018	Dragon Con	Excellence in science fiction podcasts and podcast novels.
United States	Peabody Award	2014–present	University of Georgia	Honoring the most powerful, enlightening, and invigorating stories in television, radio, and online media. First awarded to podcast-exclusive shows in 2014, though previously awarded to some radio shows also made available as podcasts
United States	Podcast Awards	2005–present	New Media Expo	Best podcasts as voted by the general public
United States	Pulitzer Prize for Audio Reporting	2020–present	Columbia University	Recognizes distinguished reporting on a radio program or podcast
United States	Shorty Awards	2014–present	Real Time Academy	People and organizations that produce real-time short form content across Twitter, Facebook, YouTube, Instagram, TikTok, Twitch and the rest of the social web First awarded to podcasts at 6th Shorty Awards
United States	Webby Award	2017–present	International Academy of Digital Arts and Sciences	Websites, advertising and media, online film and video, mobile sites and apps, and social. A podcast-specific category opened in 2017, while some podcast-related awards in website or video categories were first awarded in 2006.

== Student and educational ==
Student and educational awards are for media made by or for students.

Country	Award	Venue / sponsor	Notes
United Kingdom	Bett Awards	BETT	Information technology in education
United States	Chris Awards	Columbus International Film & Video Festival	Use of film and video in all forms of education and communication
United Kingdom	Guardian Student Media Award	The Guardian	Student journalism
Japan	Japan Prize (NHK)	NHK	Excellence in educational television
India	Nandi Award for Best Educational Film	Nandi Awards	
Ireland	National Student Media Awards	Oxygen.ie newspaper	Student journalism
United States	Student Academy Awards	Academy of Motion Picture Arts and Sciences	College and university filmmakers
India	National Film Award for Best Educational/Motivational/Instructional Film	National Film Awards	
United States	Peabody Award	National Association of Broadcasters	Powerful, enlightening, and invigorating stories in television, radio, and online media

== Women in media ==
Country	Award	Venue / sponsor	Notes
United States	Alliance of Women Film Journalists Award for Best Woman Director	Alliance of Women Film Journalists	
United States	Alliance of Women Film Journalists Award for Best Woman Screenwriter	Alliance of Women Film Journalists	
United States	Billboard Women in Music	Billboard magazine	Women in the music industry who have made significant contributions to the business ...
United States	Billie Awards	Women's Sports Foundation	Positive portrayals of female athletes in visual media
United Kingdom	Funny Women Awards	Funny Women	Female comedians
United States	Gracie Awards	Alliance for Women in Media Foundation	Programming created for women, by women, and about women
Pakistan	Hum Award for Best Model Female	Hum Awards	Female model who has achieved outstanding recognition within the fashion industry
Chile	Lenka Franulic Award	National Association of Women Journalists of Chile	Career achievement in women's journalism
United States	The Matrix Awards	Association for Women in Communications	Exceptional women in the fields of arts, advertising, entertainment, film, television, theater, books, broadcasting, magazines, newspapers, public relations and new media
United States	Women in Film & Video-DC Women of Vision Awards	Women in Film and Television International (Washington DC)	
United States	Women in Film Crystal + Lucy Awards	Women in Film and Television International	
United States	Women's Caucus for Art Lifetime Achievement Award	Women's Caucus for Art	

== See also ==
- Lists of awards
- List of media awards honoring women
- Blog award
