= Cikada Prize =

Swedish literary prize for East Asian poets

The Cikada Prize is a Swedish literary prize for East Asian poets. It was founded in 2004 following the 100th anniversary celebration commemorating of the birth of Swedish Nobel Prize winner Harry Martinson. The award consists of a diploma, 30,000 SEK and a piece of ceramic art designed by the Swedish ceramics artist Gunilla Sundström.

The award was initially (the first five prizes) presented in cooperation with the European Institute of Japanese Studies (EIJS) at the Stockholm School of Economics, the spa hotel Yasuragi, Judiska Teatern (The Jewish Theater), Östasieninstitutet (East Asia Institute) and Nyteboden. It has been financed by the Swedish Institute since 2013.

The name of the prize was inspired by Martinson's poetry collection Cikada, which was published in 1953 (Cikada is Swedish for the insect family Cicadidae). In this collection is also included the first 29 poems of his work Aniara, "The Song about Doris and Mima". The atomic bombs in Japan, followed by the construction of the world's first H-bomb in 1953, had a significant impact on Martinson's writing, which is reflected in Aniara. The prize focuses on East Asian poets, writing in Chinese, Korean, or Japanese, not only because of Martinson's interest in East Asian literature, but also because the initiators of the prize believe poetry written in these languages deserves better recognition.

== Prize winners ==
- The first Cikada Prize (2004) was given to the poet Sô Sakon (1919–2006). The prize was presented in connection with the opening of a symposium about Japanese literature at the Yasuragi in Stockholm on 6 August 2004. The prize was given to So Sakon at the Swedish Embassy in Tokyo on 3 September 2004.
- The winner of the second Cikada Prize (2005) was Japanese haiku poet Tōta Kaneko. The prize was given to Tōta Kaneko at the Swedish Embassy in Tokyo on 13 December 2005, by the Princess Desirée of Sweden.
- 2006 - Ko Un (born 1933), South Korea
- 2007 - Shin Kyeong-nim (1936–2024), South Korea
- In 2008 and 2009 there were no recipients
- 2010 - Mun Jeonghui (born 1947), South Korea
- In 2011 and 2012 there were no recipients
- 2013 - Noriko Mizuta (born 1937), Japan
- 2014 - Bei Dao (born 1949), China
- 2015 - Ý Nhi (born 1944), Vietnam
- 2016 - Yang Mu (1940–2020), Taiwan
- 2017 - Mai Văn Phấn (born 1963), Vietnam
- 2018 - Xi Chuan (born 1963), China
- 2019 - Xi Xi (born 1938), Hong Kong
- 2020 - Hiromi Itō (born 1955), Japan
- 2021 - Kim Hyesoon (born 1955), South Korea
- 2022 - Chen Yuhong (born 1952), Taiwan
- 2023 - Theophilus Kwek (born 1994), Singapore
- 2024 - Tahir Hamut Izgil (born 1969), China
- 2025 - Mutsuo Takahashi, Janpan
