= The Weblog Awards =

The Weblog Awards may refer to:

- The Weblog Awards (Bloggies), presented since 2001
- The Weblog Awards (Wizbang), presented from 2003 through 2008

== See also ==
- Blog award, an award for the best blog in a given category
