= /Film =

American film blog

- Website type: Film newsblog
- Available in: English
- Owner: Static Media
- Founder: Peter Sciretta
- Website: slashfilm.com
- Commercial: Yes
- Launched: August 23, 2005; 21 years ago
- Current status: Active

/Film, also spelled SlashFilm, is an American website that covers movie news, reviews, interviews, and trailers. The site's reviews appear on Rotten Tomatoes and two of its leading film critics are Chris Evangelista and filmmaker B.J. Colangelo.

It was founded in August 2005 by Peter Sciretta. In 2021, it was acquired by Static Media. Following the acquisition, Peter Sciretta eventually departed /Film to focus on his YouTube channel, Ordinary Adventures.

== History ==
/Film was founded in 2005 by Peter Sciretta as an alternative movie news and review blog. Sciretta was the site's editor-in-chief, and David Chen served as its managing editor from 2008 to 2012.

== Podcasts ==
/Film has hosted six podcasts since its inception. Its first podcast, The /Filmcast, began as an independent podcast hosted by Chen, Devindra Hardawar, and Adam Quigley. Five months later, Sciretta invited the hosts to make it /Film's official podcast, after which its audience grew about tenfold. Jeff Cannata joined as a co-host after Quigley left in 2013. In July 2021, the show became independent and was renamed as The Filmcast.

In October 2009, Chen launched The Tobolowsky Files, a storytelling podcast featuring actor Stephen Tobolowsky, who had previously appeared as a guest on the /Filmcast. By 2012, the podcast was available on public radio stations in Seattle and Louisville, Kentucky. Other podcasts hosted by Chen included the JustifiedCast, which followed season 3 of the TV series Justified; A Cast of Kings, co-hosted with Joanna Robinson of Vanityfair.com, which analyzed episodes of Game of Thrones; and The Ones Who Knock, where Chen and Robinson discussed episodes of Breaking Bad.

In 2017, /Film created /Film Daily, a podcast hosted by Peter Sciretta and a rotating cast of /Film writers that covered daily movie news. The podcast ended after Sciretta's departure.

As of 2026, /Film hosts /Film Weekly, an official podcast covering the latest movie and television news.

== Awards and nominations ==
- /Film won Total Film's Movie Blog Award in the Majors category.
- Time magazine named /Film one of the 25 Best Blogs of 2009.
- G4's Attack of the Show! listed it as one of the Best Movie Blogs.
- PCMag listed the site in its Best Web Sites for Movie Fans.
- /Film won the Performancing Blog Award for "Best Entertainment Blog of 2007."
- The site was nominated for, and was a finalist for, Best Major Blog for the 2008 Weblog Awards.
- It was nominated for "Best Entertainment Weblog" in the 2008 Bloggies.
