= Desicritics =

Online magazine

Desicritics is an online magazine that explores the world from the perspective of Desis, that is, people from South Asia. It provides news and opinion with a global South Asian perspective. The site is over four years old, and is recognized as "a leading source of information in the Indian Blogosphere."

The site was launched on January 26, 2006, by Aaman Lamba, who previously worked with Eric Olsen on Blogcritics.

The site features articles from over 700 bloggers from around the world that cover a wide range of topics, from the "macaca" scandal to the assassination of Pakistani tribal chieftain Akbar Bugti. Desicritics covers news in the areas of culture, politics, business, sports, media and technology among others. The site also features fiction from up-and-coming authors.

Desicritics aims to deal with South Asia in particular, including about what South Asians think about any what topic, as well as non-desis viewpoints on global topics. Articles are syndicated by numerous news aggregator sites and online magazines including IndiaSphere, Topix, Indianpad and mytoday.com. Desicritics.org also serves as an official news source for Google. Desicritics was a finalist in the Best Asian Blog category of the Web Log Awards 2006.

== Desicritics team ==
- Publisher: Aaman Lamba
- Executive Editor: Temple Stark
- Uber-Blogfather: Eric Olsen
- Executive Producer: Eric Berlin
- Technical Director: Phillip Winn
- Senior Editors: Deepti Lamba, temporal
