= Heran Darwin =

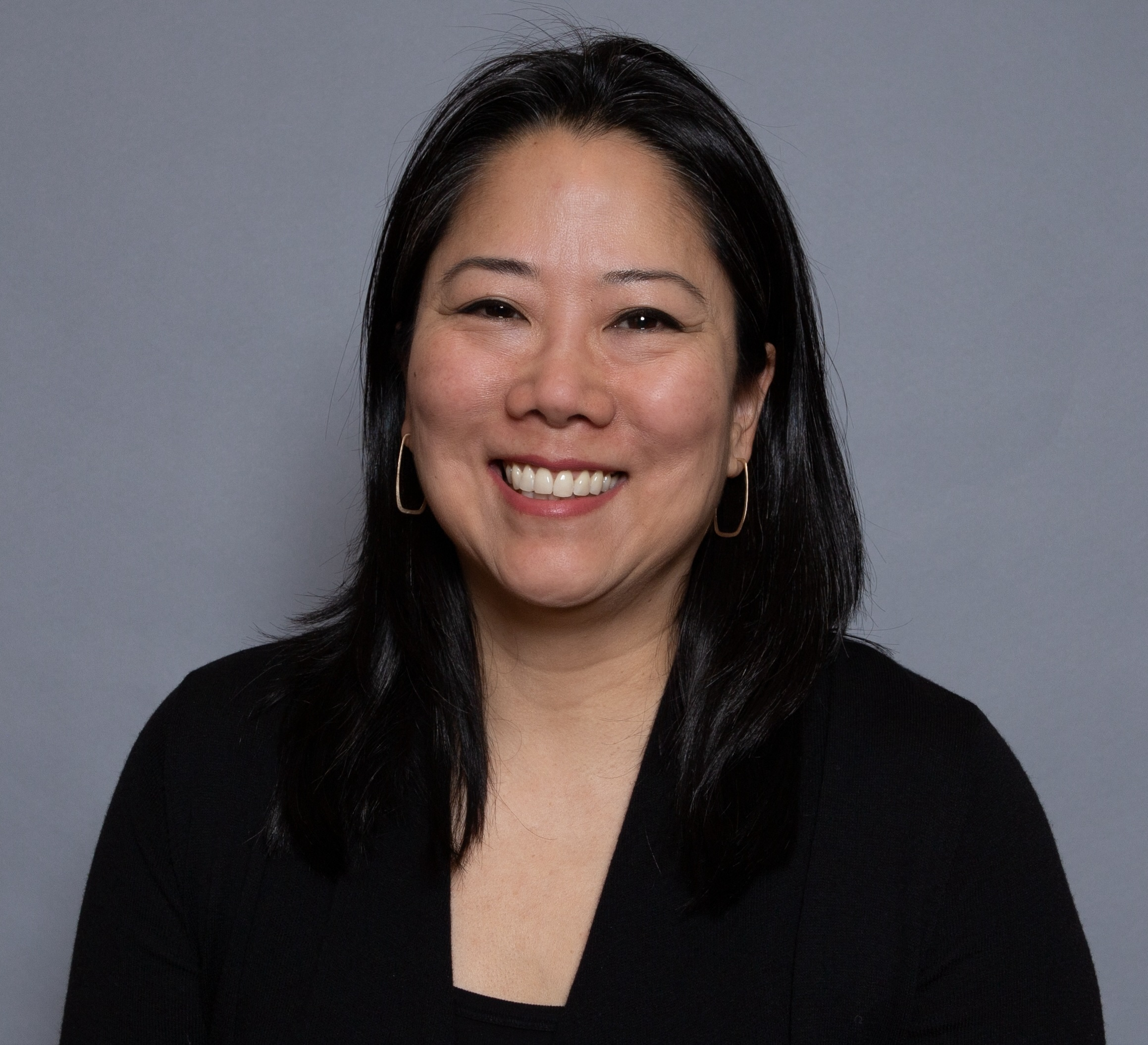
- Born: Santa Monica, California, United States
- Citizenship: United States of America
- Education: University of California, Los Angeles
- Scientific career
- Fields: Microbiology
- Workplaces: New York University

Katerina Heran Darwin (née Hong) is an American microbiologist and professor of microbiology at New York University Grossman School of Medicine. Her research interests include the bacterial proteasome and the antimicrobial effects of host-produced effectors including nitric oxide, copper, and aldehydes

== Education and academic career ==
Darwin received a bachelor's degree in microbiology and molecular genetics in 1992 and a PhD in microbiology and molecular genetics in 1999, both from the University of California, Los Angeles. Darwin earned her PhD studying type III secretion in Salmonella typhimurium with Virginia Miller, who moved her lab to Washington University in St. Louis, MO. Darwin remained with Miller for postdoctoral training before joining the lab of Carl Nathan at Weill Medical College of Cornell University (now Weill Cornell Medicine) in New York, New York.

Darwin joined the faculty of Microbiology at New York University Grossman School of Medicine in 2004. Darwin is a fellow of the American Academy of Microbiology since 2016 and was elected to the US National Academy of Sciences in 2024.

== Research ==
Darwin has dedicated her career to studying infectious bacteria, in particular, Mycobacterium tuberculosis, the bacterium responsible for tuberculosis in humans. Darwin focuses on the characterization of the M. tuberculosis proteasome, a protease complex that is key to lethal infections by M. tuberculosis and helps protect the bacterium from the innate immune defenses of the host. While characterizing the mycobacterial proteasome, Darwin's group identified the first known protein-on-protein, post-translational modification in prokaryotes called Pup (prokaryotic ubiquitin-like protein). While functionally similar to eukaryotic ubiquitin, Pup's distinct biochemistry makes it a potentially attractive drug target.

Darwin and her collaborators are currently investigating the extent to which host-derived aldehydes may contribute to infection control.

== Honors and awards ==
- 2006 Interscience Conference on Antimicrobial Agents and Chemotherapy Young Investigator Award
- 2009 Awardee, Burroughs Wellcome Fund Investigators in the Pathogenesis of Infectious Disease
- 2010 Awardee, Irma T. Hirschl Charitable Trust
- 2012 Kavli / National Academy of Sciences Fellow
- 2016 Fellow, American Academy of Microbiology
- 2023 NIH Director's Wednesday Afternoon Lecture Series (WALS), Bethesda, MD
- 2024 Samsung Ho-Am Prize for Chemistry and Life Sciences
- 2024 Elected to the National Academy of Sciences, USA
- 2027 ASM Basic Research Award
