= Ho-Am Prize in the Arts =

List of prizewinners of Korean arts award

The Ho-Am Prize was established in 1990 by Kun-Hee Lee, the Chairman of Samsung, with a vision to create a new corporate culture that continues the noble spirit of public service espoused by the late Chairman Byung-chull Lee, founder of Samsung. Awarded since 1991, it is funded by Samsung and named after their former chairman, Lee Byung-chul (Ho-Am is his pen name which means filling up a space with clear water as lakes do, and being unshakeable as a large rock). The Ho-Am Prize is currently awarded in five fields: Science, Engineering, Medicine, Arts and Community Service. The Ho-Am Prize in the Arts was established in 1994.

== Prizewinners of Ho-Am Prize in the Arts ==
- 1994: Kim Won-yong
- 1995: Nam June Paik
- 1996: Pak Kyongni
- 1997: Myung-Whun Chung
- 1998: Myung Hee Choi
- 1999: Yi Munyeol
- 2000: Kun-Woo Paik
- 2001: Lee Ufan
- 2002: Kang Sue-jin
- 2003: Im Kwon-taek
- 2004: Hwang Byungki
- 2005: O Taeseok, Bucheon Philharmonic Orchestra
- 2006: Park Wan-suh
- 2007: Yi Chong-jun
- 2008: Kyu Sung Woo
- 2009: Shin Kyeong-nim
- 2010: Min-Ho Chang
- 2011: Kyung-Wha Chung
- 2012: Unsuk Chin
- 2013: Shin Kyung-sook
- 2014: Hong Hei-kyung
- 2015: Kimsooja
- 2016: Hwang Tong-gyu
- 2017: Do Ho Suh
- 2018: Kwangchul Youn
- 2019: Lee Bul
- 2020: Kim Min-ki
- 2021: Bong Joon-ho
- 2022: Kim Hyesoon
- 2023: Seong-Jin Cho
- 2024: Han Kang
- 2025: Koo Bohnchang
- 2026: Sumi Jo

== See also ==
- Ho-Am Prize
- Ho-Am Prize in Science
- Ho-Am Prize in Engineering
- Ho-Am Prize in Medicine
- Ho-Am Prize in Community Service
