= Bloggie =

Bloggie may refer to:

- The Weblog Awards (Bloggies)
- Sony Bloggie MHS-PM5 and Sony Bloggie MHS-CM5, video cameras by Sony
