= Blogcritics =

Blog network and online magazine

- Website type: Blog/Online magazine
- Available in: English
- Owners: Critical Lens Media, Ltd.
- Creators: Eric Olsen and Phillip Winn
- Website: blogcritics.org
- Launched: 2002; 24 years ago
- Current status: Owned and operated by Critical Lens Media, Ltd. (Barbara Barnett & Jon Sobel)

Blogcritics is a blog network and online magazine of news and opinion. The site was founded in 2002 by Eric Olsen and Phillip Winn. Blogcritics features more than 100 original articles every week, and maintains an archive of all its published content.

== History ==
The site was founded in 2002 with 50 members and has substantially increased that number by allowing anyone to contribute. A team of editors reviews every article prior to publication on the site.

In August 2008, the blog search engine, Technorati, acquired Blogcritics for an undisclosed amount of money. As a result, publisher Olsen and technical director Winn became full-time Technorati employees. One of the first collaborative ventures of the two entities was for Blogcritics writers to begin writing descriptions of Technorati tags.

In April 2009, Blogcritics underwent a complete site redesign and switched content management systems.

In his official email newsletter, sent during the week of 12 Sep 2010, publisher Eric Olsen stated that he was leaving Blogcritics and Technorati:

After eight wondrous years of blood, sweat, and cheers, I (Eric Olsen) am leaving my position as publisher of Blogcritics and Technorati and heading out into the cruel world as of Sept 15. Though I am moving on, I am extremely excited about the future of Blogcritics and Technorati and strongly encourage you to continue your relationship with these outstanding organizations!

— Eric Olsen, BC/Technorati Newsletter #63

As of November 22, 2011, Blogcritics has 3,997 blog writers registered.

In March 2014, Blogcritics was acquired by executive editors Barbara Barnett and Jon Sobel under their new company Critical Lens Media, Inc.

== Recognition ==
Blogcritics has won several blog awards, including a Bloggie and recognition as a Forbes.com Best Media Blog. In addition, the site is an accredited news source for both Google News and Yahoo! News.
