= Ho-Am Prize in Mass Communication =

1991–1996 press award in South Korea

- Description: Award recognizing people or groups who furthered mass media or communications to the enhancement of the welfare of mankind
- Country: South Korea
- Presented by: Ho-Am Foundation / Samsung

The Ho-Am Prize in Mass Communication was an annual award in South Korea. It was given to people or groups who furthered mass media or communications in a way which was to the "enhancement of the welfare of mankind". It was one of the inaugural Ho-Am Prizes, established in 1991 along with the Prize in Science, Prize in Medicine, and Prize in Community Service, but was discontinued after 1996.

== Winners ==
Winners of the Ho-Am Prize in Mass Communication:

- 1991: MBC-TV Documentary Team
- 1992: Ho-Min Yang
- 1993: Chang-Bong Choi
- 1994: Kun-Ho Song
- 1995: no award
- 1996: Chang-Yul Kim
