= Ho-Am Prize =

South Korean award

- Hangul: 호암상
- Hanja: 湖岩賞
- RR: Hoamsang
- MR: Hoamsang

The Ho-Am Prize (Korean: 호암상) is a South Korean annual award presented to "domestic/abroad ethnic Korean who have made outstanding contributions to the development of science and culture and enhancement of the welfare of mankind". Starting in 1991, it is funded by Samsung and named after their former chairman, Lee Byung-chul (Ho-Am is his pen name which means filling up a space with clear water as lakes do, and being unshakable as a large rock). The award consists of a 6 oz gold medal, a laureate diploma, and 300 million South Korean won (approximately $265,000 US dollars).

The prize is currently awarded in five fields:

- Ho-Am Prize in Science
- Ho-Am Prize in Engineering
- Ho-Am Prize in Medicine
- Ho-Am Prize in the Arts
- Ho-Am Prize in Community Service

In addition, a Ho-Am Prize in Mass Communication was awarded from 1991 to 1996, but has now been replaced by a Special Prize.

== See also ==
- List of general science and technology awards
- List of awards named after people
