= List of toys and children's media awards =

This list of toys and children's media awards is an index to articles about notable awards related to toys and other products such as books and videos for children.

Country	Award	Venue / sponsor	Notes
United States	Eliot-Pearson Awards	Tufts University	Outstanding contributions in the field of children’s media
United States	Golden Spike	National Model Railroad Association	Demonstrated familiarity with different areas of the hobby
United States	Master Model Railroader	National Model Railroad Association	Achievement in several model railroading skill areas
United States	Model Car Hall of Fame	Model Car Hall of Fame	Various categories
United States	Transformers Hall of Fame	Hasbro	Distinguished people behind the Transformers franchise, and popular Transformers characters
United States	Oppenheim Toy Portfolio Award	Joanne Oppenheim, Stephanie Oppenheim	Consumer review of children's toys and media
United States	Parents' Choice Award	Parents' Choice Foundation	Excellence in children's products
Slovenia	Slovenian Good Toy Award	Slovenian Ministry of Education	Toy safety; psycho-educational evaluation; technical and technological evaluation; and adequacy of design and aesthetics
United States	Toy Industry Hall of Fame	Toy Industry Foundation	Toy-makers around the world
United Kingdom	Toy of the Year	Toy Retailers Association	Toy that excited interest among customers and retailers in the toy market
United States	National Toy Hall of Fame	A. C. Gilbert's Discovery Village	Toys and games that have sustained their popularity for many years

== See also ==
- Lists of awards
- List of media awards
- List of comics awards
- Toy
