= Bucheon Philharmonic Orchestra =

South Korean orchestra

The Bucheon Philharmonic Orchestra is an orchestra based in Bucheon, South Korea. The orchestra is resident at the Bucheon Arts Centre (BAC) Concert Hall.

== History ==
The orchestra was founded in 1988, with Seo Hoon as the founding principal conductor. Im Hun-Jeong became principal conductor in 1988. During Im's tenure, the orchestra performed the first complete cycle of the symphonies of Gustav Mahler in Korea, between 1999 and 2003. Im stood down as principal conductor in 2014 and now has the title of laureate conductor of the orchestra.

Park Young-Min succeeded Im as principal conductor, from 2015 to 2020. Chang Yun-Seong subsequently served as principal conductor from 2021 to 2023. On 1 April 2025, Adrien Perruchon became the orchestra's principal conductor, the first non-Korean conductor to take up the post.

The orchestra won the Ho-Am Prize in the Arts in 2005, becoming the first musical organisation to do so. The Bucheon Philharmonic Orchestra was the only Korean orchestra invited to the 2016 La Folle Journée, the largest classical music festival in France.

Conductors associated with the Bucheon Philharmonic Orchestra include Seo Hoon, Im Hun-Jeong, Park Young-min, Chang Yun-Sung, Adrien Perruchon, Lee Byung-wook, Jee Joong-bae, Nara Chung and Nayden Todorov. Soloists appearing with the orchestra have included So Young Park, Hee-Young Lim, Shin Chang-yong, Shin Dong-il, Park Jin-woo, Lee Ah-kyung, Yang Jun-mo and Daniel Cho.

== Principal conductors ==
- Seo Hoon (1988)
- Im Hun-Jeong (1988–2014)
- Park Young-Min (2015–2020)
- Chang Yun-Seong (2021–2023)
- Adrien Perruchon (2025–present)
