= Kim Hyesoon =

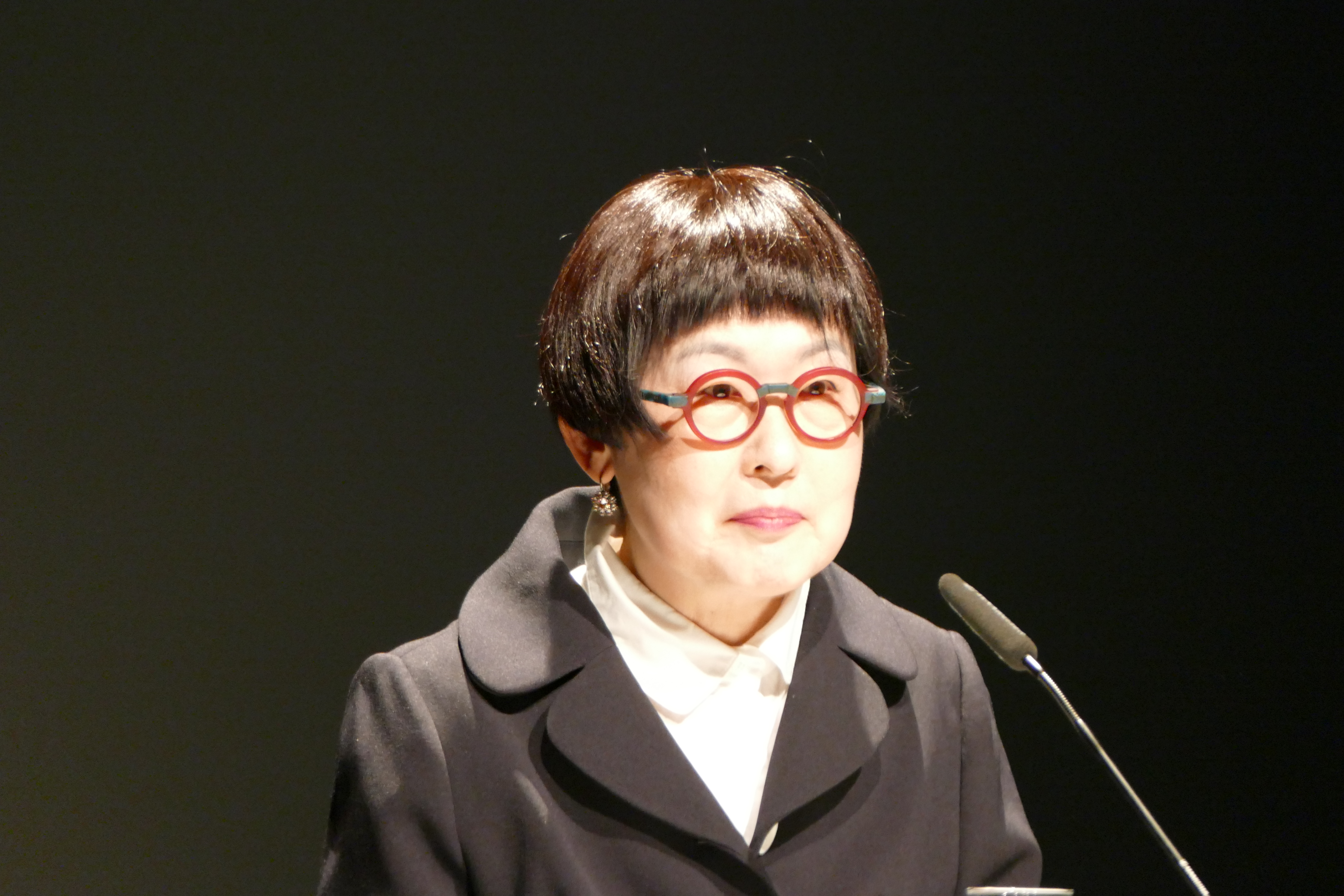
- Kim Hyesoon in Berlin (2023).
- Born: 26 October 1955 (age 71); Uljin County, North Gyeongsang Province, South Korea
- Occupations: Poet, professor
- Writing career
- Genre: Poetry
- Movement: Feminism

Korean name
- Hangul: 김혜순
- Hanja: 金惠順
- RR: Gim Hyesun
- MR: Kim Hyesun

Kim Hyesoon (Korean: 김혜순; born 26 October 1955) is a South Korean poet. She was the first woman poet to receive the Kim Su-yeong Literature Award, Midang Literary Award, Contemporary Poetry Award, and Daesan Literary Awards. She has also received the Griffin Poetry Prize (2019), the Cikada Prize, the Samsung Ho-Am Prize in the Arts (2022), U.K Royal Society of Literature International writer (2022), and National Book Critics Circle Award for Poetry, the first foreign poet laureate to win the award. In 2025, she received Internationale Literaturpreis – Haus der Kulturen der Welt for *Autobiographie des Todes*. It was the first time in the award’s history that a poetry collection was honored.

== Life ==
Kim Hyesoon was born in Uljin County, North Gyeongsang Province. She was raised by her grandmother and had tuberculous pleurisy as a child. She received her Ph.D. in Korean literature from Konkuk University and began her career as a poet in 1979 with the publication of the poem "Dead body Smoking a Cigarette" along with four other of her poems in the literary magazine Literature and Intellect (Munhak-kwa Jiseong). Kim Hyesoon is Poet, essayist, and critic. She is one of the most prominent and influential contemporary poets of South Korea. She has published fifteen poetry books and five books on poetics. Kim, who currently lives in Seoul where she teaches creative writing at the Seoul Institute of the Arts. Kim was in the forefront of women published in Literature and Intellect.

== Work ==
Kim started to receive critical acclaim in the 1990s. Her own belief is that her work was recognized at that time in no small part because the 1990s in South Korea were noted for a generally strong wave of women poets and women's poetry.

Kim is the recipient of multiple literary prizes including the Kim Su-yeong Literature Award (1996) for her poem "A Poor Love Machine", the Sowol Poetry Prize (2000), and the Midang Literary Award (2006), which are named after three renowned contemporary Korean poets. Kim was the first woman poet to receive the Kim Su-yeong Literature Award, Midang Literary Award, Contemporary Poetry Award, and Daesan Literary Award. More recently she has also received the Lee Hyoung-Gi Literary Award (2019), the Griffin Poetry Prize (2019), the Cikada Prize, the Samsung Ho-Am Prize in the Arts (2022), U.K Royal Society of Literature International writer (2022), and National Book Critics Circle Award for Poetry (2023, she is the first foreign poet laureate who won the award).

Kim Hyesoon was named the T.S. Eliot Memorial Reader at Harvard University Library (2023).

Her poetry collection Phantom Pain Wings (2023), translated by Don Mee Choi, was featured in The New York Times' list of the best poetry books of 2023. It was also included in The Washington Post's selection of notable poetry collections of 2023. The book was also recommended in the Poetry Society's Books of the Year 2023 selection.

Kim's profile appeared in The New Yorker, and her poems have appeared in The New York Times, Guernica, The Paris Review, The Nation, The Poetry Foundation, The Boston Review, The European Review poetryinternationalweb, and Tricycle.

Kim's poetry collections include: From another star (1981), Father's scarecrow (1985), The Hell of a certain star (1987), Our negative picture (1991), My Upanishad, Seoul (1994), A Poor Love Machine (1997), To the Calendar Factory Manager (2000), A Glass of Red Mirror (2004), Your First (2008), Sorrowtoothpaste Mirrorcream (2011), Blossom, Pig (2016), Autobiography of Death (2016), and Wing Phantom Pain (2019). After Earth Dies, who will Moon Orbit? (2022).

Kim has participated in readings at poetry festivals all over the world.

Kim Hyesoon's poetry was used for Jenny Holzer's exhibit at the Korean National Museum of Modern contemporary Art.

Kim Hyesoon's poetry is characterized by its experimental use of language, surrealist imagery, and exploration of themes such as death, injustice, gender, and the female experience. Her work frequently incorporates elements of feminist literary theory, particularly the concept of écriture féminine (feminine writing), emphasizing women's experiences and perspectives. Her writing often employs unconventional linguistic structures, paradoxes, and imagery to examine relationships between the body, identity, and society, connecting personal and collective experiences with social and political issues.

Kim's poetry has been translated into several languages, including Chinese, Swedish, English, French, German, Dutch, and Danish.

The birdlike Kim weaves a pattern of poems, so strangely compelling and curious, and utterly unlike anything I had heard before.

— Sasha Dugdale

=== Works in English ===
- Lady No Ecco Books ISBN 978-0-06-344668-7.
- The Hell of That Star Wesleyan University Press. ISBN 978-0-8195-0219-3.
- Phantom Pain Wings. Translated by Don Mee Choi. New Directions Publishing. ISBN 978-0-8112-3171-8.
- A Drink of Red Mirror Action Books ISBN 978-0-900575-80-8.
- Autobiography of Death. Translated by Don Mee Choi. New Directions Publishing. ISBN 978-0-8112-2734-6.
- Poor Love Machine Action Books ISBN 978-0-900575-75-4.
- I'm O.K, I'm Pig Bloodaxe Books ISBN 978-1-78037-102-3.
- Sorrowtoothpaste Mirrorcream Action Books ISBN 978-0-9898048-1-3.
- Mommy Must be a Fountain of Feathers Action Books ISBN 978-0-9799755-1-6.
- All the Garbage of the World, Unite! Action Books ISBN 978-0-9831480-1-2
- When the Plug Gets Unplugged Tinfish Press. Archived publisher page.
- Princess Abandoned(essays) Tinfish Press, 2012.

==== Anthologies and collaborative works ====
- Anxiety of Words. Zephyr Press. ISBN 978-0-939010-87-5.
- Trilingual Renshi. Vagabond Press. ISBN 978-1-922181-44-2.
- The &NOW Awards 2: The Best Innovative Writing. &NOW Books, 2012. ISBN 978-0-9823156-4-4.

=== Works in Korean ===
- From Another Star, Munhak kwa chisŏng sa, Seoul, 1981
- Father's Scarecrow, Munhak kwa chisŏng sa, Seoul, 1985
- The Hell of a Certain Star, Ch'ŏngha Seoul, 1988. Reprinted by Munhakdongnae, 1997
- Our Negative Picture, Munhak kwa chisŏng sa, Seoul, 1991
- My Upanishad, Seoul, Munhak kwa chisŏng sa, Seoul, 1994
- A Poor Love Machine, Munhak kwa chisŏng sa, Seoul, 1997
- To the Calendar Factory Manager, Munhak kwa chisŏng sa, Seoul, 2000
- A Glass of Red Mirror, Munhak kwa chisŏng sa, Seoul, 2004
- Your First, Munhak kwa chisŏng sa, Seoul, 2008
- Sorrowtoothpaste Mirrorcream, Munhak kwa chisŏng sa, Seoul 2011
- Blossom, Pig, Munhak kwa chisŏng sa, Seoul 2016
- The Autobiography of Death, Munhaksilheomsil, Seoul 2016
- Phantom Pain of wings, Munhak kwa chisŏng sa, Seoul 2019
- After Earth Dies, who will Moon Orbit?, Munhak kwa chisŏng sa, Seoul 2022
- Death Trilogy, Munhak kwa chisŏng sa, Seoul 2025
- Synchronized Sea Anemone, Nanda, Seoul 2025

=== Essays ===
- To Write as a Woman: Lover, Patient, Poet, and You (Seoul: Munhakdongnae, 2002) - Essay on Poetry
- Thus Spoke No (Proems) (Seoul: Munhakdongane, 2016)
- Women, Do Poetry (Seoul: Munhak kwa chisŏng sa, 2017)
- Do Womananimalasia (Seoul: Munhak kwa chisŏng sa, 2019)
- Kim Hyesoon's Words (Seoul: Maumsanchaek, 2023, Interview Book)
- Ventriloquism of the Air (Seoul: Munhak kwa chisŏng sa, 2026)

=== Interview ===
Williams, Ruth (2010). ""Female Poet" as Revolutionary Grotesque: Feminist Transgression in the Poetry of Ch'oe Sŭng-ja, Kim Hyesoon, and Yi Yŏn-ju". Tulsa Studies in Women's Literature. 29 (2): 395–415. doi:10.1353/tsw.2010.a461384. JSTOR 41337285. S2CID 161895782. https://www.kln.or.kr/frames/interviewsView.do?bbsIdx=387

== Awards ==
- Kim Suyeong Literary Award (1997)
- Sowol Poetry Award (2000)
- Contemporary Poetry Award (2000)
- Korea Culture and Arts Foundation 'This Year's' Art Prize (2004)
- Midang Literature Award (2006)
- Daesan Literature Award (2008)
- Lee Hyoung-Gi Literary Award (2019)
- Korea Culture & Art Prize (2019)
- Griffin Poetry Prize (2019, Canada)
- Cikada Prize (2021, Sweden)
- Ho-Am Prize in the Arts (2022)
- U.K. Royal Society of Literature International writer (2022)
- National Book Critics Circle Award for Poetry (2023, United States)
- Academy of Arts and Sciences Member: Humanities and Arts (IHM) (2025)
- International Literature Award (2025, Germany)
- Nojak Poetry Award (2026)
- The Poetry and People International Poetry Prize (2026, China)

== See also ==
- List of Korean-language poets
- List of Korean female writers
