= Chang Kee-ryo =

South Korean physician (1911–1995)

- Hangul: 장기려
- Hanja: 張起呂
- RR: Jang Giryeo
- MR: Chang Kiryŏ

Art name
- Hangul: 성산
- Hanja: 聖山
- RR: Seongsan
- MR: Sŏngsan

Chang Kee-ryo (Korean: 장기려; 14 August 1911– 25 December 1995) was a surgeon, educator, and philanthropist of South Korea.

He established Gospel Hospital, in Busan, Korea, in 1951, during the Korean War. In 1979, he won the Ramon Magsaysay Award "for his practical, personal Christian charity and in founding the Blue Cross Health Cooperative in Pusan".

== Bibliography ==
=== Early life and education ===
Chang Kee-ryo was born at Yongcheon, Heianhoku Province, Korea, Empire of Japan on 14 August 1911, the second child of father Chang Woon-seop and mother Choi Yun-kyeong.

He left Uiseong primary school in February 1923 and went to Songdo High School at Gaeseong until March 1928. From there, he entered Keijō Medical School in 1928 and graduated in 1932. After graduation, he entered Keijō Medical School as an assistant at the surgery department and became a disciple of Professor Paik Inje of the Korean Surgical Society. In 1932, he married Kim Bong-sook, the eldest daughter of Kim Ha-sik, a physician; they had three sons and three daughters.

In 1938, he worked as a lecturer in Keijō's entire surgery. In order to keep his promise to God that he would become a doctor who helped the poor who did not receive medical care due to lack of money at the time of the most rigorous and competitive entrance exam of the medical school. In September 1940, he obtained his Ph.D. in Nagoya University in bacteriological studies on appendicitis.

=== Education ===
When he was seriously contemplating his future career in his youth, his father's business failure made his family finances difficult and he applied to Keijō Medical School because of its government-supported tuition. At this time, he swore to be a doctor for poor patients if it was God's will that he become a doctor. He graduated from the medical school at the top of his class.

After graduation, he entered Keijō Medical School as an assistant to study further under Professor Paik Inje, the Korean surgical authority.

In 1940, he was awarded a doctoral degree in medicine in relation to the bacteriological study of appendicitis. And he worked as a surgical teacher at the University of Pyongyang and Kim Il Sung University in 1947.

=== Korean War ===
In December 1950, when U.N. and South Korean troops recaptured Pyongyang, Chang was treating wounded soldiers at a university hospital and field hospital. When the South Korean army withdrew from Pyongyang, he was taking a patient transport ambulance to the South. He found his wife and children in the ranks of the refugees, but he could not stop and ask for a ride for his family because the emergency patients were on board. Only his second son, who came to deliver his luggage, came to South Korea with him. He had regarded it as a lifelong regret.

In the following year, wishing to help refugees from the North, Chang set up a tent in Yeongdo District, Busan, and established the Clinic of Gospel, which was a precursor to the current Gosin Hospital, to provide free medical treatment for the poor until June 1976.

=== Blue Cross movement and liver research ===
Hospital costs were too high for the poor in the 1960s without health insurance. He created the Blue Cross Medical Cooperative, modeled after the Northern European Medicare System in 1968, and became the parent of the Korean health care insurance system. At that time, South Korea's first medical insurance union succeeded with one belief that it could not overburden the poor despite the lack of understanding and financial difficulties surrounding it.

He was the first in Korea to successfully remove a lump of liver cancer from the liver in 1943 and, in 1959, he succeeded in mass decontamination of liver cancer patients. His work on liver blood vessels and microstructure has helped relieve the pain of many patients with liver diseases and contributed greatly to the development of liver disease and medical talent in Korea's overseas sciences.

For his services, he was awarded the Order of National Merit (Dongbaeg medal) in 1976, the Magsaysay Award (community service sector) in 1979, and the humanitarian award for practice in 1995. He has been praised as a saint of Korea for his philanthropy and his services to the poor, in spite of his suffering from diabetes in his old age. His grave is within the Moran park in Maseok, Gyeonggi Province. He was awarded the Order of the National Merit (Mugunghwa medal) in 1996. He was inducted into the Korea Scientists and Engineers Hall of Fame in 2006.

== Achievements ==
=== Research ===
Chang has dissected a dead body of a patient who has cellulitis and sepsis. Through this experience, he researched seven more sepsis cases and published his paper "Rereoperitoneum Cellulitis" in The Journal of the Japanese Surgical Society. He was awarded the degree of Doctor of Medicine at Japan Nagoya University for publishing "Bacteriological Research on Appendictius and Peritonitis due to Appendicitis" on 20 September 1940. He then worked as the chief of the surgical section at Pyongyang United Christian Hospital. He published his paper titled "A Histo-Clinical Study of Myositis" in The Journal of the Japanese Surgical Society in April 1942. In 1943, he succeeded on "the resection of liver from a liver cancer patient".

After the independence of Korea, he worked as the principal and the chief of the surgical section at the Provincial Hospital of Pyongyang. In 1947, he received the Model Worker Prize from the North Korean government. On 4 December 1950, he came to South Korea in haste accompanying only his second son with the Korean army. In 1951, he founded the Clinic of Gospel with two other pastors. In 1952, he worked as a professor at College of Medicine, Seoul National University. In 1961, he was elected as the president of the Korean Surgical Society.

In 1968, he founded the Busan Gospel specialized School of Nursing Care and was the first president. In 1969, he wrote a Korean textbook, Surgery, with professor Kim Hee-Kyu and Hong Pil-Hoon. In 1974, he was the first president of the Korean Research Society of Liver. This society researched the liver and hepatobiliary surgery. It changed its name to Busan Research Society of Liver in 1982.

Chang's most important research achievements are his study of the liver. His surgical team succeeded in resecting a large amount of liver from a liver cancer patient for the first time in Korea. After eight more liver resection surgeries, they proved that liver resection is not a dangerous surgical procedure. Hepatobiliary surgery has developed in large measure due to their work. They presented about this surgery in June at the Academic Conference of the Korean Medical Society and received the Korean Academic Award on 1961.

Chang presented "A morphological research on intrahepatic blood vessels and biliary tract of Koreans" at the Academic Conference of the Medical Society of Korea in October 1960. This presentation was medically important since it provided the basis of hepatobiliary surgery.

=== Foundation of the health cooperative ===
Another major achievements of Chang is the foundation of the Blue Cross Health Cooperative. This act came from his volunteering spirit to poor people. The foundation of the cooperative provided the main basis of medical insurance in South Korea.

Chang won the Ramon Magsaysay Award for "his practical, personal Christian charity and in founding the Blue Cross Health Cooperative" in 1979.

== Awards and recognition ==
- Achievement award at Health Care Day from the mayor of Busan
- Korean Medical Association scholarship award from the president
- 4th Health day camellia medal from the president
- Gold award from Korea Red Cross
- "Ramon Magsaysay" social service award
- 23rd Busan municipal cultural prize
- "Proud person of Seoul National University" prize
- National medal "mugunghwa medal" from the president
- Hall of fame of top scientists
- 1991 Ho-Am Prize in Community Service

== Publications and related books ==
- Chang, Kee Ryo; Yang, Duck Ho/Park, Yong Hoon. (1963). "Clinical Study of Primary Cancer of The Extrahepatic Biliary Tract". Korean Cancer Association vol. 2, issue 2, pp. 75–90

== See also ==
- Kosin University
- Gospel Hospital
