= Suh Nam-pyo =

South Korean and American engineer (born 1936)

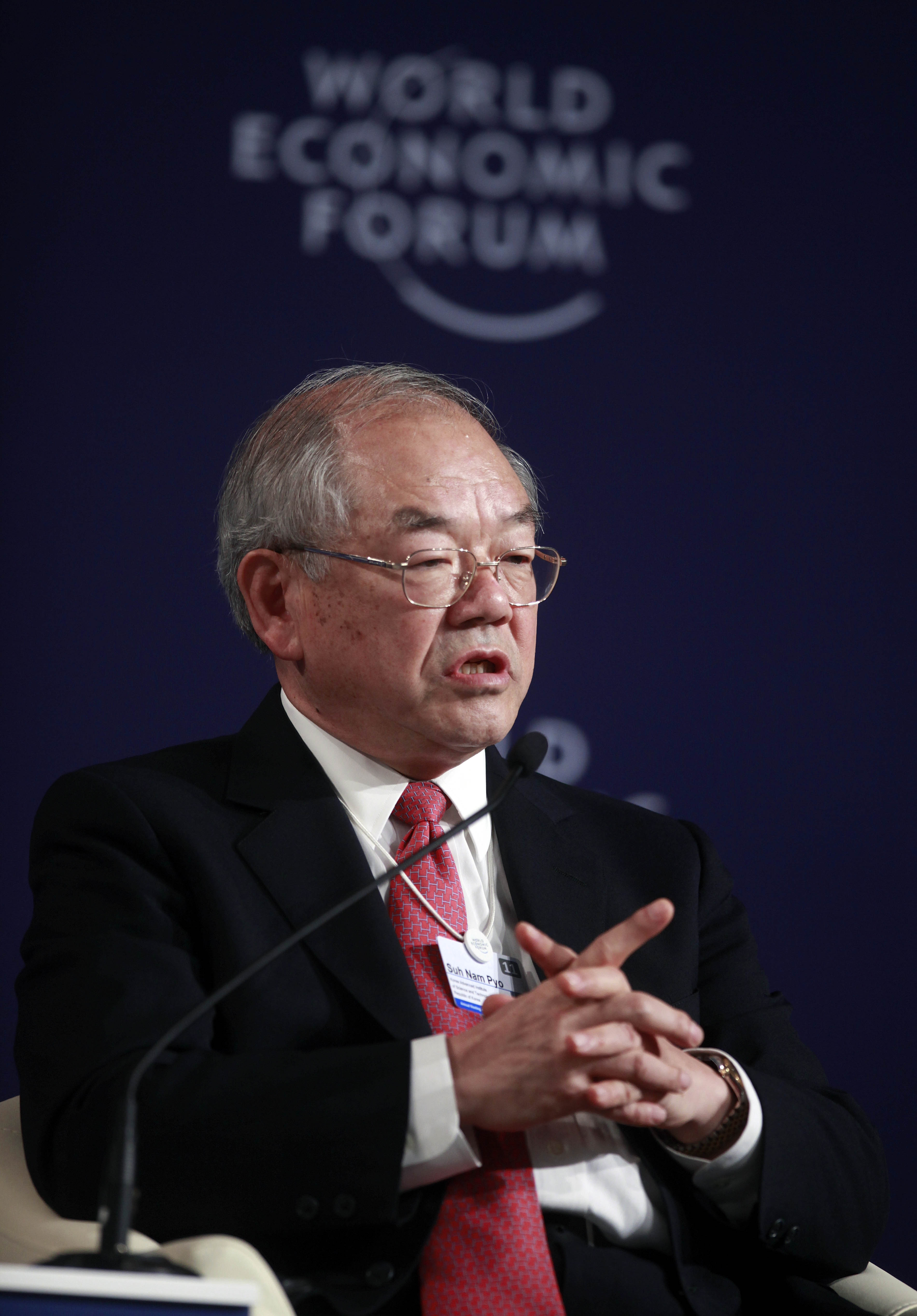
- Suh in 2011

Korean name
- Hangul: 서남표
- Hanja: 徐南杓
- RR: Seo Nampyo
- MR: Sŏ Namp'yo

Suh Nam-pyo (Korean: 서남표; born 22 April 1936) was the thirteenth president of KAIST from 2006 until 2013, succeeding Robert B. Laughlin and succeeded by Sung-Mo Kang.

== Personal life ==
Suh was born in Korea on 22 April 1936. He emigrated to the U.S. in 1954 to join his father who was teaching at Harvard University. He completed his high school education at Browne & Nichols School before entering MIT as a freshman in 1955. He was naturalized in 1963 in Pittsburgh, Pennsylvania.

== Career ==
Suh began his career at MIT in 1970, where he was the Ralph E. & Eloise F. Cross Professor, Director of the Park Center for Complex Systems (formerly the Manufacturing Institute), and the Head of the Department of Mechanical Engineering for ten years from 1991 to 2001. He was also the Founding Director of the MIT Laboratory for Manufacturing and Productivity (1977–1984), the Founder and Director of the MIT-Industry Polymer Processing Program (1973–1984), Head of the Mechanics and Material Division of the Mechanical Engineering Department (1975-1977), and a member of the Engineering Council of MIT (1980–1984 and 1991–2001).

In October 1984, Suh took a leave of absence from MIT to accept a Presidential Appointment at the National Science Foundation where he was in charge of engineering. President Ronald Reagan appointed him to this position and the U.S. Senate confirmed his appointment. During his tenure at NSF, he created a new direction for the Engineering Directorate and introduced a new organizational program structure for supporting engineering research in order to strengthen engineering education and research and "to insure that the United States will occupy a leadership position in engineering well into the 21st century." He returned to MIT in January 1988.

Suh was named president of KAIST in June 2006, and was re-elected to his position on 14 July 2010. He is also the Ralph E. & Eloise F. Cross Professor, Emeritus, M.I.T. As the President of KAIST, he provided framework for two large-scale systems, On-Line Electric Vehicle (OLEV) and Mobile Harbor. During his term of office, he innovated the tenure review system for professors, increased the diversity of the faculty by increasing the number of female and international professors, provided more chances in admission for the students from non-special-purposed high schools, required English lecture for all undergraduate courses to better prepare students for international leadership, and introduced design education for all first year students to help them develop problem solving abilities. He also contributed to improve major educational indices of KAIST in terms of world university ranking and the reserved amount of donations.

However, there were concerns that his policies while president of KAIST encouraged "academic Darwinism" among students, and during his presidency a spate of suicides took place at the university. When a KAIST student wrote a blog post that was critical of his policies, Suh sued him for libel.

Suh was also criticized for decisions to award honorary doctoral degrees to some of the board of trustees of KAIST, which could be seen by some as unethical as the board of trustees oversees Suh's role as the president of KAIST. Out of 16 honorary degrees awarded, at least seven were given to the former or present board members.

== Education ==
- B.S., Mechanical Engineering, 1959, Massachusetts Institute of Technology.
- M.S., Mechanical Engineering, 1961, Massachusetts Institute of Technology.
- Ph.D, Mechanical Engineering, 1964, Carnegie Mellon University.

== Honorary doctorates ==
- Eng. D. (Hon.), Worcester Polytechnic Institute, Worcester, MA.
- L.H.D. (Hon.), University of Massachusetts-Lowell, Lowell, MA.
- Tekn.Dr. hc, Royal Institute of Technology, Stockholm, Sweden
- D. Eng honoris causa, The University of Queensland, Brisbane, Australia
- Doctor Scientiarum Honoris Causa, the Technion, Israel Institute of Technology, Israel
- Doctor of Science and Technology (Hon), Carnegie Mellon University, Pittsburgh, PA
- Doctor Honoris Causa, Babes-Bolyai University, Cluj-Napoca, Romania
- Doctor Honoris Causa, Universidade Nova de Lisboa, Lisbon, Portugal
- Doctor Honoris Causa, Universitatea Tehnică „Gheorghe Asachi”, Iași, Romania.
- Doctor Engineering (Hon.), Ulsan National Institute of Science and Technology, Korea

== Awards ==
- 1997: Ho-Am Prize in Engineering
- 2008: Inchon Award
- 2009: ASME Medal

== Korean Wikipedia article dispute ==
The Korean Wikipedia's article on Suh was the subject of frequent vandalism and edit warring, allegedly by Suh himself or his secretary.
