= Carlo Wolff =

American journalist (born 1943)

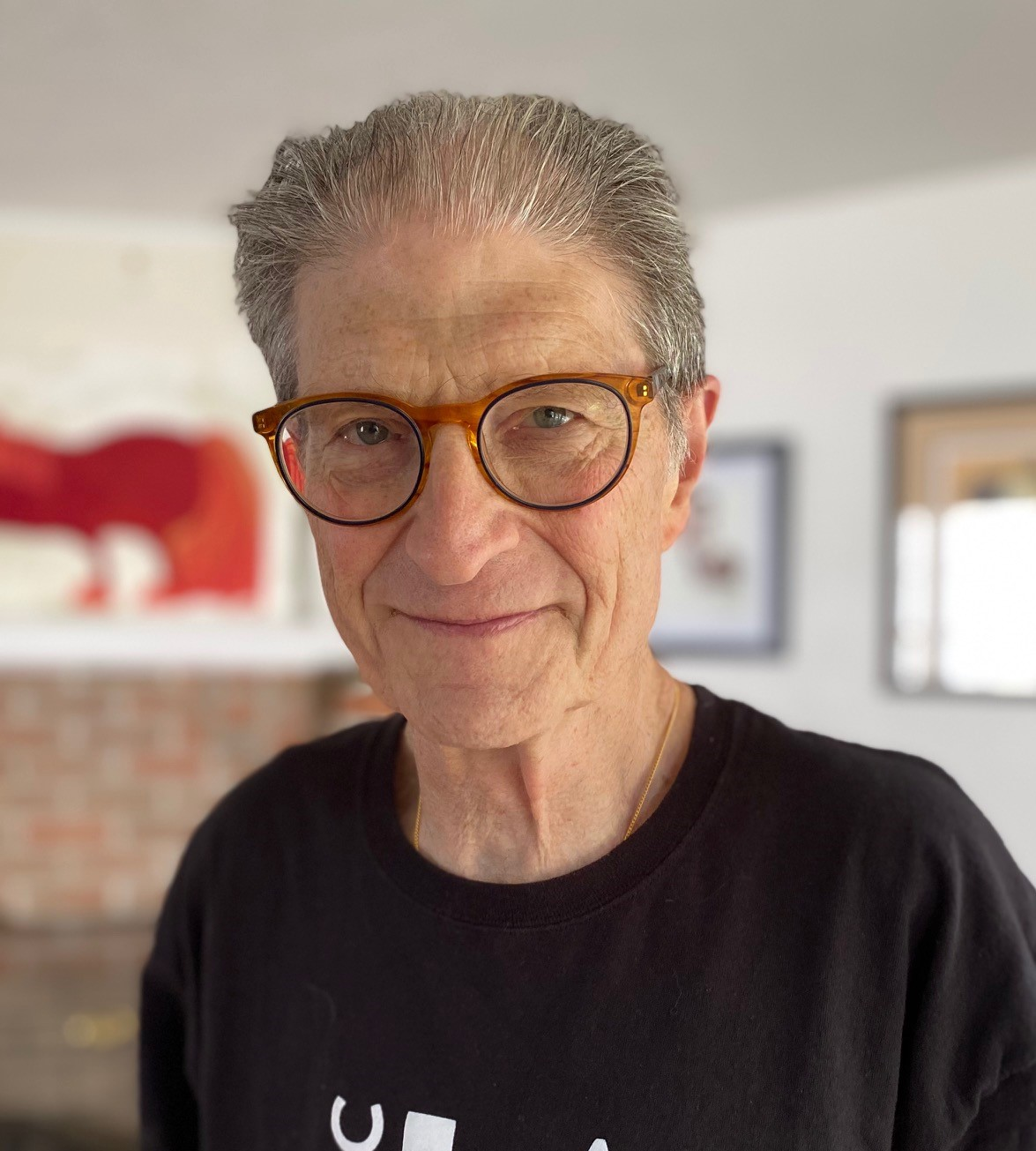
- Born: July 22, 1943 (age 83); Dallas, Texas, U.S.
- Occupations: Journalist, author, critic, pop-culture historian, speaker
- Writing career
- Genres: book reviews, music criticism, personal essays, memoirs, business profiles

Carlo Wolff is a prolific freelance journalist and author who has written for publications including The Boston Globe, Chicago Sun-Times, Pittsburgh Post-Gazette, The Plain Dealer (Cleveland, Ohio), and The Christian Science Monitor. He specializes in music criticism, book reviews and feature articles about popular culture, travel, and business. Among his former outlets: Goldmine and Billboard.

From February 1990 to August 2008, Wolff worked for Lodging Hospitality, a Penton Media trade publication targeting the hotel industry. During his last eight years with LH, he was Features Editor. His work has appeared in various B2B magazines, cultural journals, and weekly and daily newspapers including the Cleveland Jewish News and the New York Times He is a regular contributor to Downbeat, a monthly jazz magazine.

Wolff has been involved in several books, including The Encyclopedia of Record Producers, a 1999 Billboard publication instigated by Eric Olsen, founder of blogcritics.com, a critical portal to which Wolff has contributed. Wolff's book, Cleveland Rock and Roll Memories, was published in November 2006 by Gray and Company, Publishers.

Wolff was lead author of Mike Belkin: Socks, Sports, Rock & Art". Part memoir, part chronicle of both the personal and professional life of a major force in the rock 'n' roll industry, the book features Mike Belkin as contributing author. The book was published in October 2017 by Act 3 of Cleveland, Ohio. In April of 2019, Wolff was co-author on Designing Victory, Robert P. Madison's memoir; in 1954, Madison was the first registered African-American architect in Ohio, and the 10th in the United States. The book was also published by Act 3.

In February of 2021, Wolff's third collaborative book, Trying Times, by notable Cleveland attorney Terry Gilbert was also published by Act 3. Gilbert's memoir details his 50 years as a civil rights attorney and details his involvement in high-profile cases such as the Sam Sheppard 1999 civil trial for wrongful imprisonment and police accountability in the shooting of Timothy Russell and Malissa Williams.

In 2003, Wolff made critical waves with his take on Mitch Albom's "The Five People You Meet in Heaven." Commissioned by the Detroit Free Press, where Albom is a star columnist, it was suppressed by that newspaper and subsequently published in the Fort Lauderdale Sun-Sentinel and numerous other mainstream and alternative newspapers. Wolff's Albom review is reprinted in "Killed," a compilation of censored journalism, put together by David Wallis, the man behind Featurewell, a journalism portal to which Wolff also occasionally contributes. The review also is archived at PoynterOnline, an interpretive journalism portal.

In addition to his literary criticism, Wolff has chronicled and interpreted jazz for decades, including a long stint as the key jazz critic for The Plain Dealer.

A former vice-president of the board of the Cleveland Jazz Orchestra, Wolff has written liner notes and promotional material for recording companies including Fantasy, Prestige and Milestone, Sony/Columbia, Warner Brothers and Blue Note. Wolff lives in Cleveland, Ohio.
