= Kosin University =

University in Busan, South Korea

- 고신대학교
- Motto: Coram Deo (Latin)
- Motto in English: Before God
- Type: Private
- Established: September 1946; 80 years ago
- Location: Busan, South Korea; 35°05′N 129°04′E
- Website: www.kosin.ac.kr/kr/index.php?pCode=main

Korean name
- Hangul: 고신대학교
- Hanja: 高神大學校
- RR: Gosin daehakgyo
- MR: Kosin taehakkyo

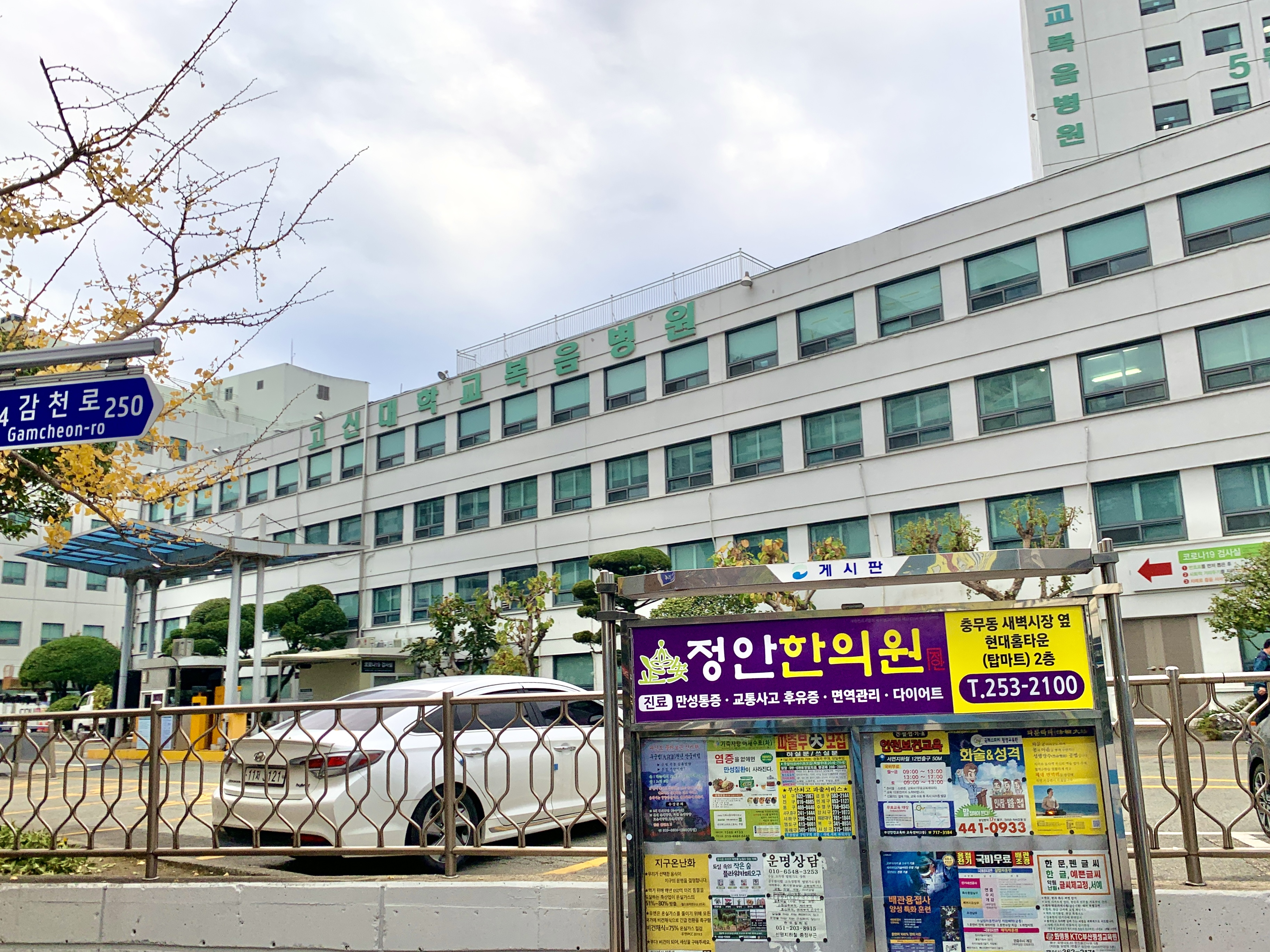
Kosin University

Kosin University (Korean: 고신대학교) is a private Christian university in Busan, South Korea. The name "Kosin" is derived from the name of a denomination of Presbyterian churches in Korea that had organized actions against the Empire of Japan. This university was established in 1946 at the end of Japanese rule in Korea.

In 2024, Kosin and 19 other Korean universities were banned from accepting international students for a year.

== Campuses ==
Kosin University consists of two campuses: Songdo campus and Youngdo campus.

Songdo campus: Songdo campus is located in Amnam-dong, Seo-gu, Busan.

- College of Medicine – Kosin university Gospel hospital is the one of leading hospitals in Korea for cancer treatment. This hospital was established by the famous founder Dr. Chang Kee-ryo.
- College of Nursing

Youngdo campus: Youngdo campus is located in Youngdo-gu, Busan.

- College of Theology
- College of Humanities and Social Sciences
- College of Natural Sciences
- College of Arts

== Notable alumni and students ==
- Im Ji-kyu, actor
