= Gospel Hospital =

Korean teaching hospital in Busan

Kosin University Gospel Hospital
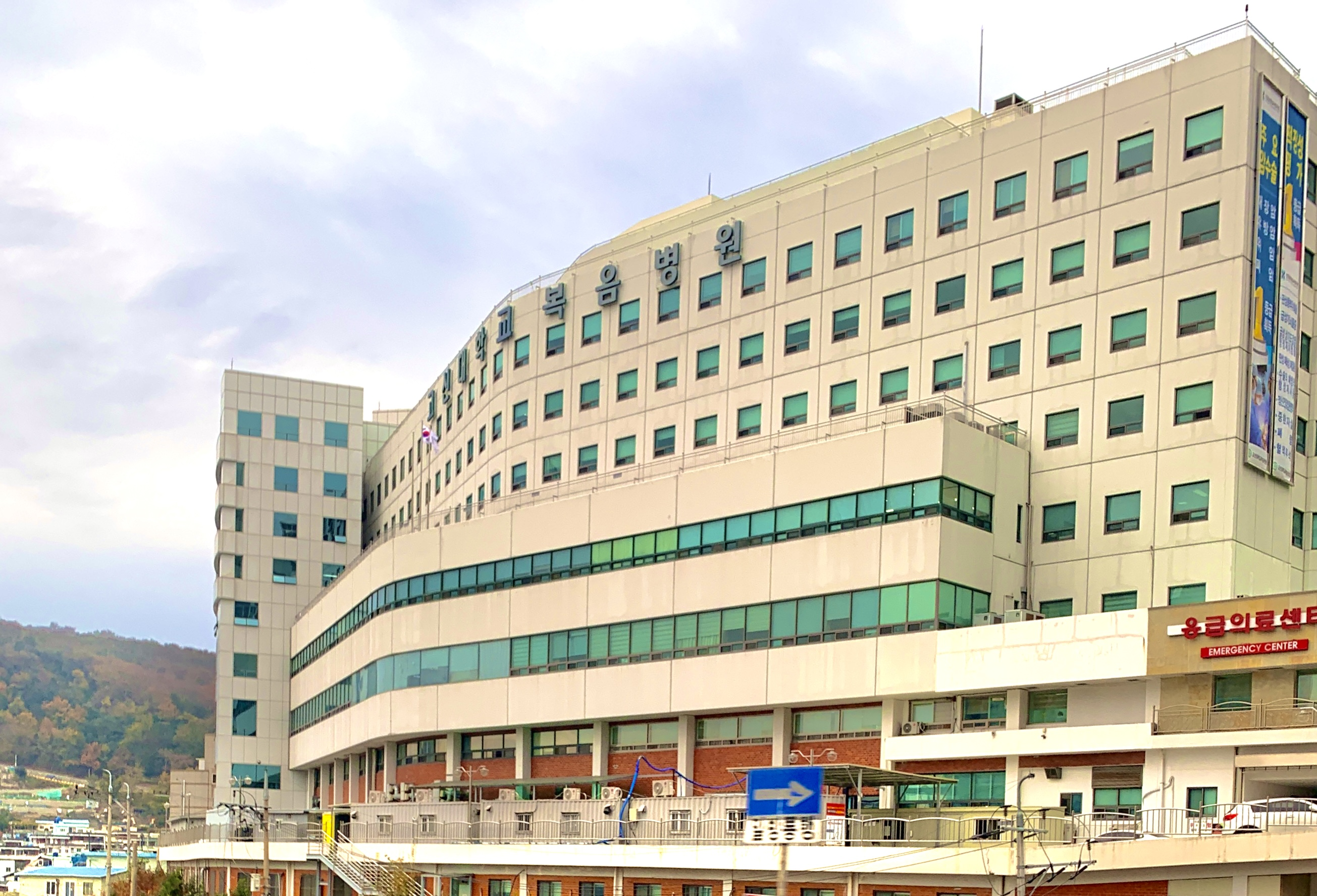

Geography
- Location: 34 Amnam-dong, Seo-gu, Busan, South Korea
- Coordinates: 35.080592°N 129.015898°E

Organisation
- Type: Teaching
- Affiliated university: College of Medicine, Kosin University

Services
- Beds: 912

History
- Opened: 1951

Links
- Website: www.kosinmed.or.kr/eng
- Lists: Hospitals in South Korea

Kosin University Gospel Hospital (KUGH or Gospel Hospital; Korean: 고신대학교복음병원) is a teaching hospital of the College of Medicine, Kosin University in 34 Amnam-dong Seo-gu Busan Busan, South Korea.

== History ==
Gospel Hospital was established by Han Sang-Dong, Jeon Young Chang and Dr. Chang Kee-ryo (or Jang Gi-Ryeo) to care for refugees during the Korean War.

The hospital was first established in a warehouse of the Third Youngdo Church, 46 2Ga, Namhang-dong, Busan. Later, in December 1951, the hospital was moved to 180, 2Ga, Yeongseon-dong, Youngdo-gu. Gospel Hospital moved to its current location in 1957, helped by a donation from the United States Agency for International Development (USAID). A new building was constructed in 1959.

In 1978, Gospel Hospital Cancer Center opened. This was a first for the southern region of the Republic of Korea, and it was the second cancer center founded in the country.

The hospital affiliated with The Gospel College of Nursing in 1968, The College of Medicine of Kosin University in 1981, and The Public Health Graduate School of Kosin University in 1993.

== Current status and achievements ==
The hospital has 912 beds and is a leading institute for cancer treatment in Korea. The surgical staff performs over 400 operations for gastric cancer patients yearly, highest amount for hospitals in Busan and South Gyeongsang province. The clinical results for breast, colorectal, thyroid and pancreas surgeries are also notable.

Arrhythmia ablation and kidney transplantation were performed for the first time in Busan and South Gyeongsang province at Gospel Hospital.
