= Eric Olsen (writer) =

American writer (born 1958)

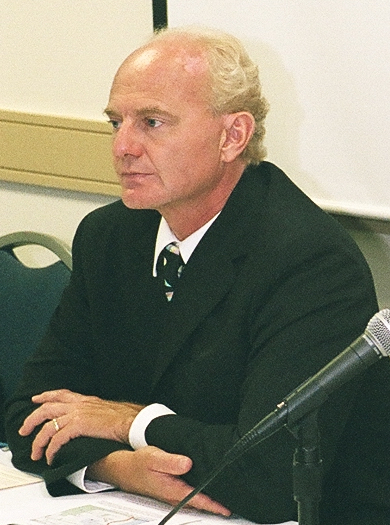
- Born: August 5, 1958 (age 68); San Pedro, California, U.S.
- Education: Wittenberg University
- Occupations: Journalist, blogger, publisher
- Writing career
- Period: 1980s-current

Eric Olsen (born August 5, 1958) is the founder, editor-in-chief, and publisher of broad-based online critical magazine Blogcritics and author of local Cleveland blog Cleve-blog. His primary site, Blogcritics, has gathered together over 2,000 authors on a wide variety of topics and is a widely read news/information site with over 64,000 unique visits per day, and 50 new articles and reviews posted daily on a variety of topics.

== Early life ==
Originally from San Pedro, California, he is a graduate of Wittenberg University with degrees in political science and philosophy.

== Career ==
Over the last 20 years, Olsen has written for print and online publications on a wide variety of topics, from popular media to politics, and his work has appeared in Playboy, Billboard, Alternative Press, Option, The Plain Dealer, the Akron Beacon Journal, Hear/Say, MSNBC.com, Cleveland.com, and other outlets.

His book publications include Networking In the Music Industry (with Jim Clevo, Rockpress, 1993) and The Encyclopedia of Record Producers (with Paul Verna and Carlo Wolff, Billboard Books, 1999), a definitive work in the field featuring original interviews, bios, and discographies of over 500 of the leading producers in recording history.

Timothy White, former Editor-in-Chief of Billboard magazine, called The Encyclopedia "one of the truly indispensable reference books on the annals of the music industry." Rock historian and author Barney Hoskyns (Rock's Backpages, Waiting For the Sun: Strange Days, Weird Scenes & The Sound of Los Angeles) described it as "a landmark publication ... the ultimate guide to the sonic architects, alchemists and just plain old artisans." Rock historian and author Ira Robbins (Trouser Press) said "this exceptionally well-researched and far-ranging book shines a long overdue spotlight on the often unsung heroes of recorded music."

Olsen also compiled, produced and wrote the liner notes for the Straight Outta Cleveland CD collection (Oglio, 1995), which Stephen Thomas Erlewine called in Allmusic "a thoroughly entertaining hodgepodge of songs by Cleveland bands from the Raspberries and the James Gang to Devo and Pere Ubu," which captures "the spirit of the city ... very well indeed."

Olsen, who owned and operated the Olsen Entertainment DJ company in Los Angeles in the 1980s, appeared as a music critic on WJW, Fox 8 TV in Cleveland, and created/hosted the Cool Tunes radio show on WRQK 1990–1994, WENZ 1994–1996, WAPS 1999–2002.

In 2008, Olsen and his partners sold Blogcritics.org to media property Technorati.com and worked as the publisher and editor-in-chief to both Blogcritics.org and Technorati.com's newly re-launched original online media content site until September 2010. On April 24 of 2011, he and his wife Dawn Olsen, along with writer Andrew Morton, launched TheMortonReport.com. As CEO and co-founder of TheMortonReport.com, the Olsens will be working side by side with Morton to bring original quality content to the Internet, focusing on celebrities, entertainment and popular culture.

Olsen was named a Trendsetter on the AlwaysOn/Technorati Open Media 100—a "power list of bloggers, social networkers, tool smiths, and investors leading the Open Media Revolution," in 2005.

== Personal life ==
He resides in Cleveland, Ohio, with his wife and four children.

== Published works ==
- Clevo, Jim; Eric Olsen (1993). Networking in the Music Industry. Hal Leonard. ISBN 0-9627013-6-X.
- Olsen, Eric; Paul Verna; Carlo Wolff (1999). The Encyclopedia of Record Producers: An Indispensable Guide to the Most Important Record Producers in Music History. Billboard Books. ISBN 0-8230-7607-5.
