= UK Screen Alliance =

British trade association for companies that work in film and TV production

- Abbreviation: UKSA
- Predecessor: UK Screen Association
- Formation: 2004; 22 years ago
- Founders: UK Film Council and Department of Trade and Industry (United Kingdom)
- Type: Trade association
- Legal status: Alliance
- Purpose: Trade body to represent the UK's visual effects, animation and post production sectors
- Location: London, United Kingdom
- Region served: United Kingdom
- Services: Advocacy for the industry
- Members: 200 companies (2025)
- Chief Executive: Neil Hatton
- Staff: 5 (2025)
- Website: www.ukscreenalliance.co.uk

The UK Screen Alliance (formerly UK Screen Association) is a British trade body that represents companies working in the film, TV and commercials industries. The association promotes the business interests of companies involved in audio and video post-production, visual effects (VFX), special effects, animation, camera and equipment hire and production studios.

The CEO, appointed in 2016 is Neil Hatton, who was awarded an MBE in the new year honours list of 2025 for services to visual effects and animation.

Leading member companies include Framestore, Double Negative, Industrial Light and Magic UK, Aardman Animations, Cinesite and Molinare.

== History ==
In 2004 the Department of Trade and Industry and the UK Film Council provided seed funding to assist in the establishment of a new trade body to represent the UK's post production and visual effects sector. This led to the foundation of UK Post (later to be renamed UK Screen Association). UK Post made a contribution to the film tax consultation conducted by HM Treasury and Department for Digital, Culture, Media and Sport. It also engaged with the BBC to access information to enable its member companies to make decisions about the future direction of their businesses.

UK Post's remit expanded in 2006 to provide representation for all companies providing services to the film and broadcast industry in 2006. On 5 September 2006, the association's name was changed to UK Post & Services. In 2007 the association's board decided that a more radical change of name was necessary to reflect the trade body's broadened remit, its expanded membership and the industry's move towards multi-platform content creation and delivery. The board announced the name had been changed to UK Screen Association on 30 May 2007.

UK Screen played a significant part in driving the changes to the UK's Film and High-End TV tax relief announced in the 2013 Autumn Statement which created an increase in inward investment work. Further lobbying during 2014 resulted in the lowering of the qualification threshold for tax relief from 25% to 10% in the Chancellor's Budget of 2015 and reform of the cultural test. This allowed many productions to qualify for tax relief on the basis of VFX or post production work alone.

In November 2016, UK Screen Association announced that it was joining forces with Animation UK to form the UK Screen Alliance, citing increasingly converging policy interests and a desire for a louder voice to government.

During the COVID-19 pandemic, the UK Screen Alliance published Guidance for Safe Working in Post Production and VFX which was produced in consultation with British Film Commission, BFI, BECTU, Producers Alliance for Cinema and Television and the Department for Digital, Culture, Media and Sport.

In 2024, the UK Screen Alliance persuaded the UK government to introduce an uplift in respect of VFX in the Audio Visual Expenditure Credit (AVEC). This is intended to attract further inward investment into the UK from film and TV producers. In addition UK Screen Alliance's campaign resulted in the exemption for VFX from the 80% of core expenditure cap on UK eligible expenditure.

== Mission ==
UK Screen Alliance acts as the strategic lobbying group interacting with government agencies, providing a support mechanism and a voice for its members, with particular focus on:

- Fiscal, legislative, and employment and standards
- The promotion of the film, TV, animation and commercials sector to existing and potential clients in both the UK and abroad
- Development of skills
- Ensure the best talents from the home and abroad are attracted to work within the UK's film, TV, animation and commercials industry

== Projects ==
- Access:VFX - UK Screen Alliance is a founder member of this VFX industry movement to encourage inclusion in the industry
- Conch awards - awards (2006-2012), recognising the achievements of individuals and companies working in audio post production.
