= Virginia L. Miller =

American microbiologist

Virginia Miller
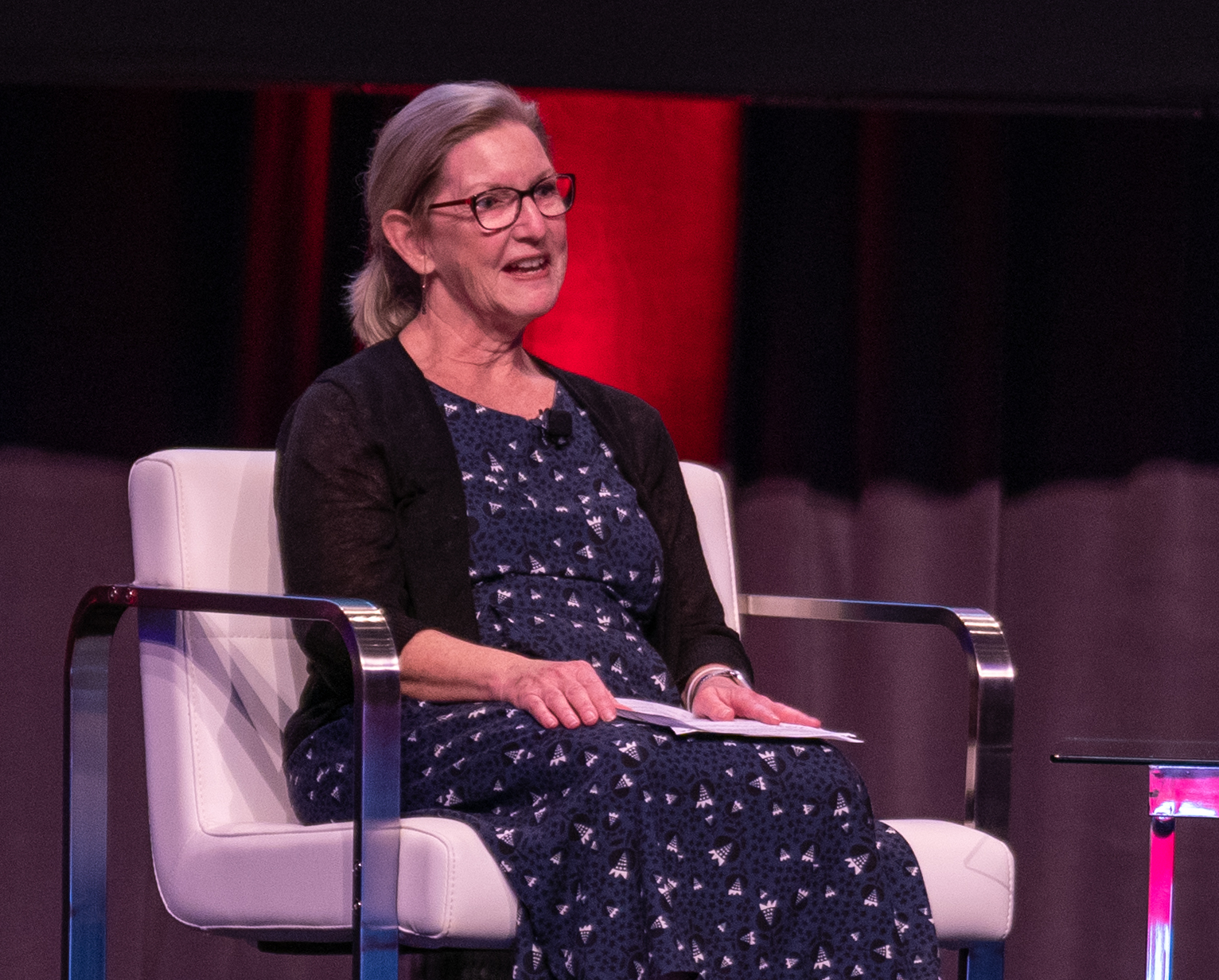
- At the 2022 Microbe annual meeting
- Born: 1954 (age 71–72)
- Education: University of California at Santa Barbara; Harvard University; Stanford University
- Scientific career
- Workplaces: UCLA; WUSTL; University of North Carolina at Chapel Hill
- Thesis: Analysis of the cholera toxin positive regulatory gene, toxR (1985)

Virginia L. Miller is an American microbiologist whose research focuses on microbial pathogenesis, particularly the regulation of bacterial virulence during infection. She has studied the pathogenic mechanisms of Vibrio cholerae, Yersinia enterocolitica, Yersinia pestis, Salmonella, and Klebsiella pneumoniae. She is a fellow of the American Academy of Microbiology and the American Association for the Advancement of Science and served as president of the American Society for Microbiology from 2023 to 2024.

== Education ==
Miller received a B.A. in biological sciences from the University of California, Santa Barbara in 1979. She received a Ph.D. in microbiology and molecular genetics from Harvard University in 1985, where she studied the regulation of cholera toxin expression under the supervision of John J. Mekalanos. Her doctoral dissertation was titled Analysis of the cholera toxin positive regulatory gene, toxR.

From 1985 to 1988, Miller conducted postdoctoral research in medical microbiology at Stanford University under microbiologist Stanley Falkow. During this period she began studying the molecular mechanisms of Yersinia and Salmonella pathogenesis.

== Career ==
Miller joined the faculty of the University of California, Los Angeles in 1988 as an assistant professor in the Department of Microbiology and Molecular Genetics and the Molecular Biology Institute. She became an associate professor in 1994.

In 1996, Miller moved to the Washington University School of Medicine in St. Louis, where she was appointed associate professor in the Departments of Molecular Microbiology and Pediatrics. She became a professor in 2000.

Miller joined the University of North Carolina at Chapel Hill in 2008 as a professor in the Departments of Genetics and Microbiology and Immunology. From 2008 to 2011 she also served as assistant dean of graduate education, and from 2011 to 2013 as associate dean of graduate education. She remained a professor at UNC until October 2024.

== Research ==
Miller's research focuses on the molecular mechanisms by which bacterial pathogens regulate virulence and adapt to conditions encountered during infection. Her early work investigated the regulation of cholera toxin production by Vibrio cholerae.

In 1987, Miller, Ronald K. Taylor, and John J. Mekalanos reported that ToxR, a transcriptional activator of cholera toxin expression, is a transmembrane DNA-binding protein. Subsequent work demonstrated that ToxR also regulates other virulence determinants and outer-membrane proteins in V. cholerae.

Miller subsequently investigated the molecular basis of virulence in Yersinia enterocolitica and Yersinia pestis. Her research examined bacterial factors involved in invasion, colonization, and systemic dissemination, as well as regulatory mechanisms controlling virulence genes. She also investigated the role of the RovA regulatory protein in Yersinia pathogenesis.

Her research on Yersinia pestis examined mechanisms involved in the development and dissemination of plague. In a study published in 2006, Miller and colleagues identified RovA as a global regulator required for the development of bubonic plague in a mouse model. Later work used bioluminescence imaging to examine dissemination of Y. pestis in mice.

Miller has also studied Salmonella pathogenesis, including the interaction of Salmonella enterica with host tissues and the regulation of bacterial virulence factors.

At UNC, Miller's research has focused particularly on Klebsiella pneumoniae. Her laboratory has investigated the genetic and regulatory mechanisms underlying K. pneumoniae virulence. Her research has examined the relationship between capsule expression, hypermucoviscosity, and hypervirulence in K. pneumoniae.

More recent research has examined the molecular basis of K. pneumoniae hypervirulence. A 2023 study involving Miller found that the hypermucoviscosity regulator RmpD interacts with Wzc and influences capsular polysaccharide chain length. A 2026 study involving Miller reported that acquisition of the rmpADC locus can increase the virulence of classical K. pneumoniae in the absence of other hypervirulence-associated genes.

== Awards and honors ==
- 1989 Pew Scholar in the Biomedical Sciences
- 1994–1999 National Institutes of Health Research Career Development Award
- 2001–2003 American Society for Microbiology Foundation Lecturer
- 2003 Elected a fellow of the American Academy of Microbiology.
- 2024 Elected a fellow of the American Association for the Advancement of Science

== Professional leadership ==
Miller has held leadership positions in the American Society for Microbiology (ASM). She was elected president-elect for the 2022–2023 term and became ASM president in July 2023. She served as ASM president during 2023–2024 and subsequently served as past president during 2024–2025.

During her ASM presidency, Miller chaired the society's Scientific Units Taskforce, which developed a proposed restructuring of ASM's scientific organization into three units: Mechanism Discovery, Applied and Environmental Microbiology, and Health.

== Selected publications ==
=== Vibrio ===
- Miller, V L; Mekalanos, J J (1984). "Synthesis of cholera toxin is positively regulated at the transcriptional level by toxR". Proceedings of the National Academy of Sciences. 81 (11): 3471–3475. Bibcode:1984PNAS...81.3471M. doi:10.1073/pnas.81.11.3471. ISSN 0027-8424. PMC 345530. PMID 6374658.
- Miller, Virginia L.; Taylor, Ronald K.; Mekalanos, John J. (1987-01-30). "Cholera toxin transcriptional activator ToxR is a transmembrane DNA binding protein". Cell. 48 (2): 271–279. Bibcode:1987Cell...48..271M. doi:10.1016/0092-8674(87)90430-2. ISSN 0092-8674. PMID 3802195. S2CID 28576010.
- Miller, V L; Mekalanos, J J (1988-06-01). "A novel suicide vector and its use in construction of insertion mutations: osmoregulation of outer membrane proteins and virulence determinants in Vibrio cholerae requires toxR". Journal of Bacteriology. 170 (6): 2575–2583. doi:10.1128/jb.170.6.2575-2583.1988. PMC 211174. PMID 2836362.

=== Yersinia ===
- Pepe, J C; Miller, V L (1990). "The Yersinia enterocolitica inv gene product is an outer membrane protein that shares epitopes with Yersinia pseudotuberculosis invasin". Journal of Bacteriology. 172 (7): 3780–3789. doi:10.1128/jb.172.7.3780-3789.1990. ISSN 0021-9193. PMC 213356. PMID 1694524.
- Darwin, Andrew J.; Miller, Virginia L. (2001). "The psp locus of Yersinia enterocolitica is required for virulence and for growth in vitro when the Ysc type III secretion system is produced". Molecular Microbiology. 39 (2): 429–445. doi:10.1046/j.1365-2958.2001.02235.x. ISSN 0950-382X. PMID 11136463.
- Cathelyn, Jason S.; Crosby, Seth D.; Lathem, Wyndham W.; Goldman, William E.; Miller, Virginia L. (2006-09-05). "RovA, a global regulator of Yersinia pestis , specifically required for bubonic plague". Proceedings of the National Academy of Sciences. 103 (36): 13514–13519. Bibcode:2006PNAS..10313514C. doi:10.1073/pnas.0603456103. ISSN 0027-8424. PMC 1569194. PMID 16938880.
- Gonzalez, Rodrigo J.; Lane, M. Chelsea; Wagner, Nikki J.; Weening, Eric H.; Miller, Virginia L. (2015-01-22). "Dissemination of a Highly Virulent Pathogen: Tracking The Early Events That Define Infection". PLOS Pathogens. 11 (1) e1004587. doi:10.1371/journal.ppat.1004587. ISSN 1553-7374. PMC 4303270. PMID 25611317.

=== SALMONELLA ===
- Darwin, K. Heran; Miller, Virginia L. (2000). "The putative invasion protein chaperone SicA acts together with InvF to activate the expression of Salmonella typhimurium virulence genes". Molecular Microbiology. 35 (4): 949–960. doi:10.1046/j.1365-2958.2000.01772.x. ISSN 0950-382X. PMID 10692170.
- Darwin, K.Heran; Miller, Virginia L. (2001-04-17). "Type III secretion chaperone-dependent regulation: activation of virulence genes by SicA and InvF in Salmonella typhimurium". The EMBO Journal. 20 (8): 1850–1862. doi:10.1093/emboj/20.8.1850. ISSN 0261-4189. PMC 125432. PMID 11296219.

=== KLEBSIELLA ===
- Walker, Kimberly A; Miller, Virginia L (2020). "The intersection of capsule gene expression, hypermucoviscosity and hypervirulence in Klebsiella pneumoniae". Current Opinion in Microbiology. 54: 95–102. doi:10.1016/j.mib.2020.01.006. PMC 8121214. PMID 32062153.
- Ovchinnikova, Olga G.; Treat, Logan P.; Teelucksingh, Tanisha; Clarke, Bradley R.; Miner, Taryn A.; Whitfield, Chris; Walker, Kimberly A.; Miller, Virginia L. (2023-06-27). Heran Darwin, K. (ed.). "Hypermucoviscosity Regulator RmpD Interacts with Wzc and Controls Capsular Polysaccharide Chain Length". mBio. 14 (3) e00800-23. doi:10.1128/mbio.00800-23. ISSN 2150-7511. PMC 10294653. PMID 37140436.
- Salisbury, Stephen M.; Miner, Taryn A.; Kent, Leslie A.; Lam, Margaret M. C.; Holt, Kathryn E.; Miller, Virginia L.; Walker, Kimberly A. (2026-01-14). Laub, Michael T. (ed.). "The acquisition of rmpADC can increase virulence of classical Klebsiella pneumoniae in the absence of other hypervirulence-associated genes". mBio. 17 (1) e03122-25. doi:10.1128/mbio.03122-25. ISSN 2150-7511. PMC 12802315. PMID 41363447.
