= Ý Nhi =

Vietnamese poet (born 1944)

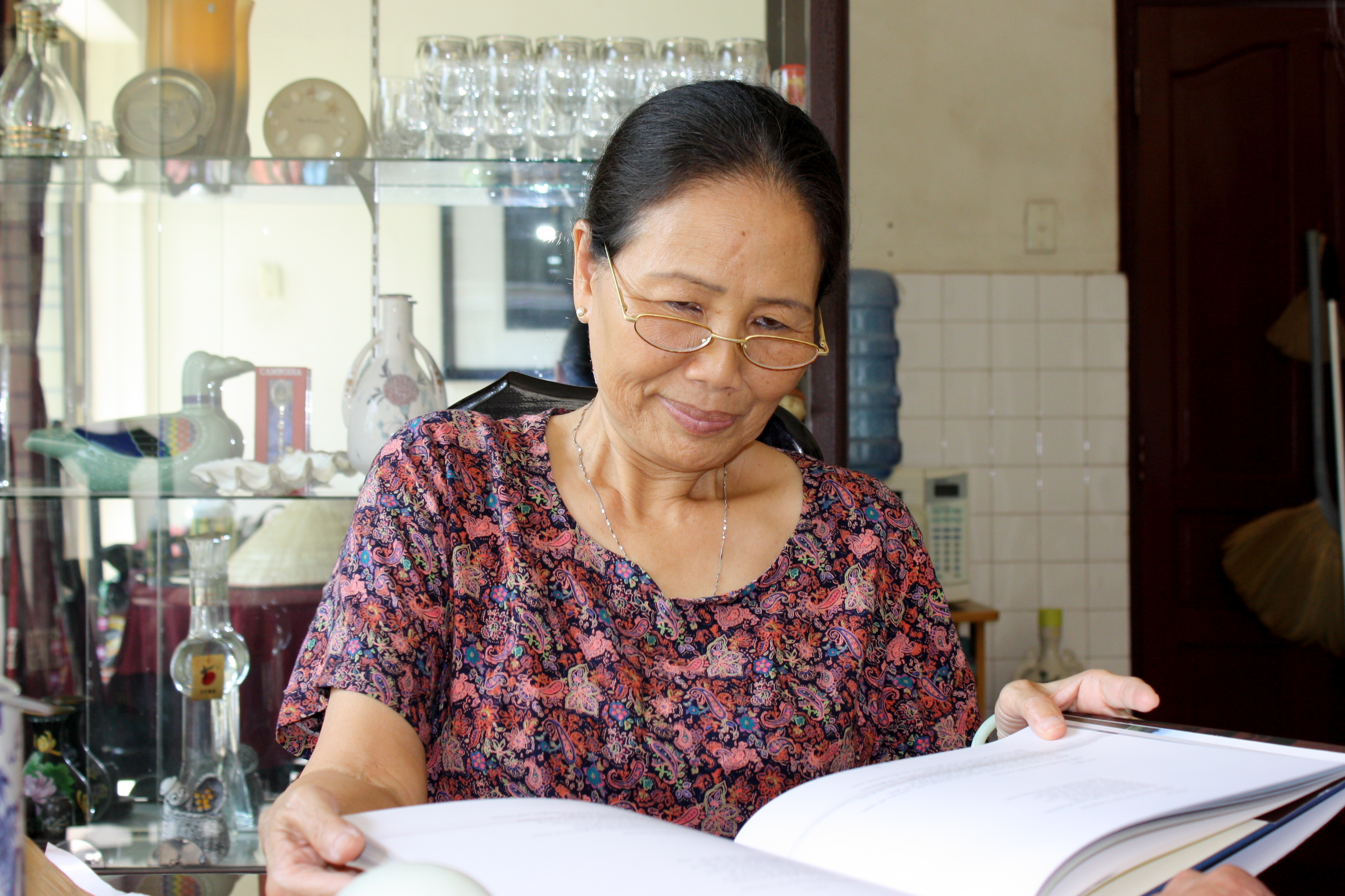
Y Nhi at her home in Ho Chi Minh City, 2010

Hoàng Thị Ý Nhi (born 1944) is a Vietnamese poet.
