= Ho-Am Prize in Engineering =

The Ho-Am Prize in Engineering was established in 1994 by Kun-Hee Lee, the Chairman of Samsung, to honour the late chairman, Lee Byung-chul, the founder of the company. The Ho-Am Prize in Engineering is one of six prizes awarded annually, covering the five categories of Science, Engineering, Medicine, Arts, and Community Service, plus a Special Prize, which are named after the late chairman's sobriquet (art-name or pen name), Ho-Am.

The Ho-Am Prize in Engineering is presented each year, together with the other prizes, to individuals of Korean heritage who have furthered the welfare of humanity through distinguished accomplishments in the field of Engineering.

== Prizewinners of Ho-Am Prize in Engineering ==
Source: Ho-Am Foundation

- 1994: Tae-Yang Lee
- 1995: Duk-Yong Yoon
- 1996: Chang-Dae Han
- 1997: Nam-Pyo Suh
- 1998: Sun-Tak Hwang
- 1999: Hong Thomas Hahn
- 2000: Sungho Jin
- 2001: Dong Nyung Lee
- 2002: Jeongbin John Kim
- 2003: Yongmin Kim
- 2004: Dewey Doo-Young Ryu
- 2005: Kyung-Suk Kim
- 2006: Kang G. Shin
- 2007: Chang-Beom Eom
- 2008: Hyunjune Sebastian Seung
- 2009: Deog-Kyoon Jeong
- 2010: Luke Pyungse Lee
- 2011: Thomas H. Lee
- 2012: Taeghwan Hyeon
- 2013: Sangtae Kim
- 2014: Sang-Yup Lee
- 2015: Chang-Jin Kim (C.J. Kim)
- 2016: Jun Ho Oh
- 2017: Jin Jang
- 2018: Nam-Gyu Park
- 2019: Andrew B. Kahng
- 2020: Jae S. Lim
- 2021: Kyunghyun Cho
- 2022: Sang Kyun Cha
- 2023: Yang-Kook Sun
- 2024: Su-In Lee
- 2025: Seung-Woo Kim
- 2026: Bumman Kim

== See also ==
- List of engineering awards
- Ho-Am Prize in Science
- Ho-Am Prize in the Arts
- Ho-Am Prize in Medicine
- Ho-Am Prize in Community Service
