= Mai Văn Phấn =

Vietnamese poet and translator (born 1955)

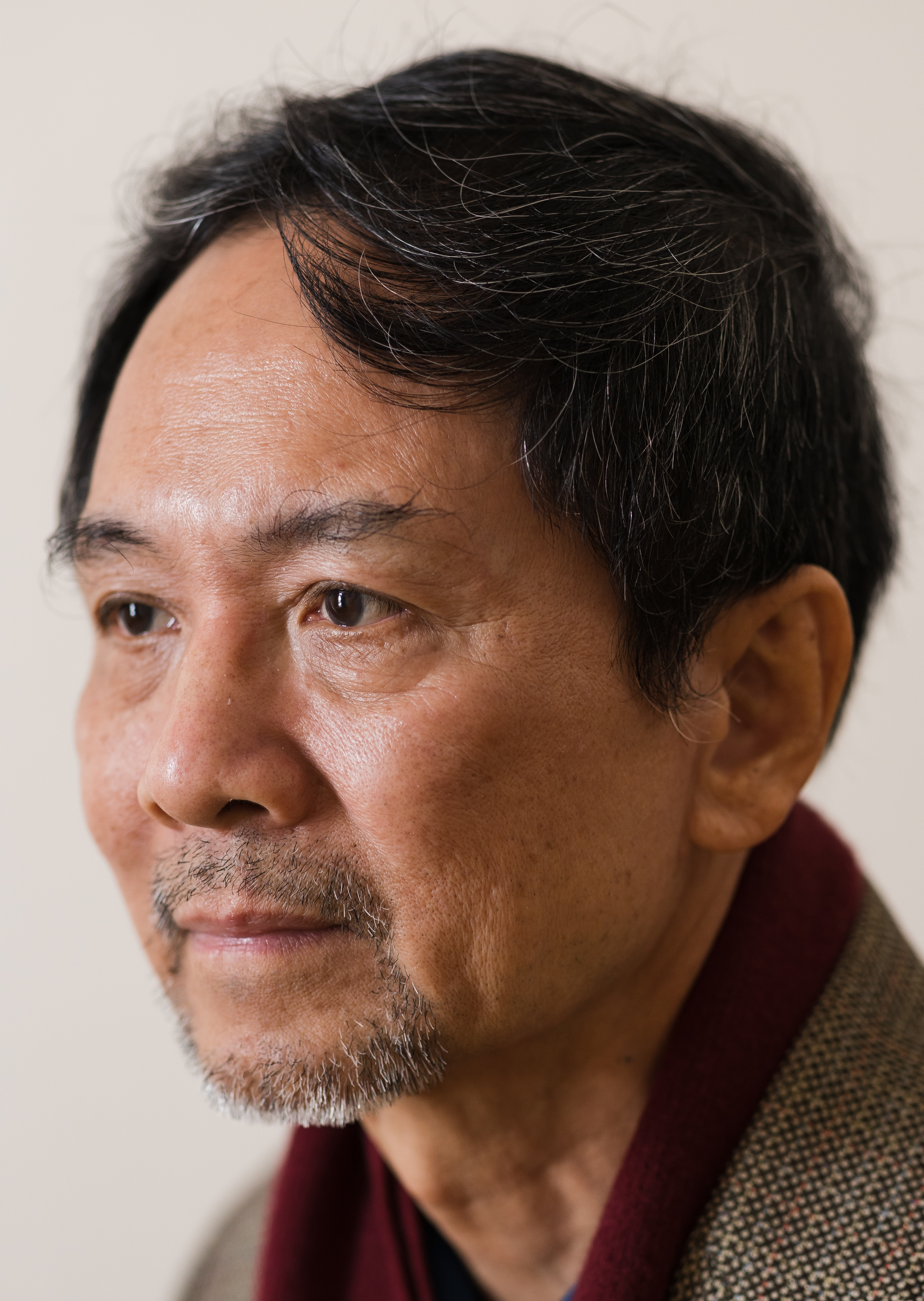
- Born: 1955 (age 70–71); Ninh Bình, North Vietnam
- Occupations: Poet, literary critic, translator
- Writing career
- Pen name: Mai Văn Phấn
- Period: 1955 – present

Mai Văn Phấn (born 1955) is a Vietnamese poet, literary critic and translator.

== Biography ==
Mai was born in Ninh Bình, Red River Delta in North Vietnam. He served in the army infantry from 1974 to 1981, after which he enrolled at Hanoi College of Foreign Languages, the department of Linguistics and Russian culture. From 1983 he continued his studies at Maxim Gorky Pedagogical School in Minsk, now the Belarus Pedagogical University. As of 2015, he lived in Hải Phòng.

== Notable works ==
Mai has published 19 books in Vietnam and 34 books abroad, including poetry collections, books of literary criticism and essays, and translations. Poems of his have been translated into more than 40 languages.

In December 2012, Mai's English-language collection Firmament without Roof Cover was one of the 100 best-selling poetry collections on Amazon. In June 2014, three of Mai's collections in Vietnamese, English and French were among the top-10 best-selling poetry collections from Asia on Amazon.

=== Vietnamese publications ===
Unless stated otherwise, poetry collections in Vietnamese.

- Giọt nắng ("Drops of Sunlight". Hải Phòng Writer's Association, 1992)
- Gọi xanh ("Calling to the Blue". Publishing House of The Vietnam Writer's Association, 1995). OCLC 40478732
- Cầu nguyện ban mai ("Prayers to Dawn". Hải Phòng Publishing House, 1997). OCLC 41016098
- Nghi lễ nhận tên ("Ritual of Naming". Hải Phòng Publishing House, 1999). OCLC 44499817
- Người cùng thời ("People of the Era". Hải Phòng Publishing House, 1999). OCLC 68708655
- Vách nước ("Water Wall". Hải Phòng Publishing House, 2003). OCLC 53372782
- Hôm sau ("The Day After". Publishing House of The Vietnam Writer's Association, 2009). OCLC 1408442919
- Và đột nhiên gió thổi ("And Suddenly the Wind Blows". Literature Publishing House, 2009). OCLC 1408443158
- Bầu trời không mái che ("Firmament Without Roof Cover". Publishing House of The Vietnam Writer's Association, 2010)
- Thơ tuyển Mai Văn Phấn (Selected poems, essays and interviews. Publishing House of The Vietnam Writer's Association, 2011). OCLC 957180416
- Hoa giấu mặt ("Hidden-face Flower". Publishing House of The Vietnam Writer's Association, 2012). OCLC 1013803506
- Bầu trời không mái che / Firmament Without Roof Cover" (Bilingual poetry collection in Vietnamese - English. Publishing House of The Vietnam Writer's Association, 2012). OCLC 1013757586
- Vừa sinh ra ở đó ("Just Born There". Publishing House of The Vietnam Writer's Association, 2013). OCLC 879288066
- A Ciel Ouvert ("Firmament Without Roof Cover". Bilingual poetry collection in Vietnamese - French. Publishing House of The Vietnam Writer's Association, 2014). OCLC 879286345
- Selected Poems of Mai Văn Phấn. In English (Publishing House of The Vietnam Writer's Association, 2015). ISBN 9786045349496
- Thả ("Letting go". Publishing House of The Vietnam Writer's Association, 2015). ISBN 9786045351604
- Không gian khác ("Another Dimension". Critical essays in Vietnamese. Publishing House of The Vietnam Writer's Association, 2016). ISBN 9786045362600
- Thơ chọn lọc (Nhà xuất bản Hội nhà văn, 2016). ISBN 9786045379127
- Lặng yên cho nước chảy ("Be Quiet for Water Flowing". Publishing House of The Vietnam Writer's Association, 2018). ISBN 9786049609381
- Thời tái chế ("Era of Junk". Publishing House of The Vietnam Writer's Association, 2019). ISBN 9786049838538
- Nhịp điệu vẽ lối đi" ("Rhythms Compose the Way"). Critical essays in Vietnamese. Publishing House of The Vietnam Writer's Association, 2024. ISBN 9786043685664
- Trong Ơn Gọi ("In Vocation"). Critical essays in Vietnamese. Đồng Nai Publishing House and Nước Mặn Bookcase, 2025.

=== Internationally published books ===
- Firmament Without Roof Cover (Page Addie Press, 2012). ISBN 9780980715552
- Những hạt giống của đêm và ngày / Seeds of Night and Day (Bilingual poetry collection in Vietnamese - English. Page Addie Press UK, 2013). ISBN 9780992296438
- Những hạt giống của đêm và ngày / Seeds of Night and Day (Bilingual poetry collection in Vietnamese - English. Nxb. Hội Nhà văn, 2013). ISBN 9786045306017
- A Ciel Ouvert ("Firmament Without Roof Cover". Bilingual poetry collection in Vietnamese - French. Page Addie Press UK; Publishing House of The Vietnam Writer's Association, 2014). ISBN 9780992296490
- Buông tay cho trời rạng / Out of the Dark" (Bilingual poetry collection in Vietnamese - English. Page Addie Press UK; Publishing House of The Vietnam Writer's Association, 2013). ISBN 9780992296452
- Ra vườn chùa xem cắt cỏ / Grass Cutting in a Temple Garden (Bilingual poetry collection in Vietnamese - English. Page Addie Press Australia, 2014)
- Zanore në vesë / Vowels in The Dew (Poetry collection in Albanian. Botimet M&B, Albania, 2014)
- บุษบาซ่อนหน้า / Hidden Face Flower / Hoa giấu mặt (Poetry collection in Thai, English and Vietnamese. Artist's House, Thailand, 2015). OCLC 1103325077
- Yên Tử Dağının Çiçeği ("The Flower of Mount Yên Tử". Poetry collection in Turkish. Şiirden Yayincilik, Turkey, 2015). ISBN 9786054825448
- आलाप प्रतिलाप ("Echo of the Aalap". Poetry collection in Hindi. Kritya, India, 2016)
- Два крыла / Đôi cánh ("Two Wings". Bilingual poetry collection in Vietnamese - Russian. Нонпарелъ, Moscow, 2016)
- Варијације у кишнојноћи ("Variations on a Rainy Night". Poetry collection in Serbian. Алма, Београд, Republic of Serbia, 2017)
- Echoes from the Spiral Galaxy (Poetry collection in English. Mundus Artium Press, USA, 2017). ISBN 9780939378142
- Höstens hastighet ("The Pace of Autumn". Poetry collection in Swedish. Tranan, Sweden, 2017). ISBN 9789188253217
- সত্যের সন্ধানে ("In Search of Truth". Poetry collection in Bengali. Underground Literature, Kolkata, 2018)
- 대양의 쌍둥이 ("Born as Twins in an Ocean". Poetry collection in Korean with poet 고형렬 / Ko Hyung-Ryul). Publisher: 시와 표현 (Poetry & Expression) of S. Korea, 2018)
- حيث تتسع السماء ("Where the Sky Is Spacious". Poetry collection in Arabic. Alfarasha, Kuwait, 2019)
- Время утиля / Thời tái chế ("Era of Junk". Bilingual poetry collection in Russian - Vietnamese. Центр духовного возрождения Черноземного края, Russia, 2020)
- Ära des Mülls / Era of Junk (Bilingual poetry collection in German - English. Shaker Media, Germany 2020). ISBN 9783956317729
- Қабоҳат даври ("Age of Ignorance". Poetry collection in Uzbek. Uzbekistan: Янги аср авлоди, 2020)
- Kapanahunan ng Basura ("Era of Junk". Poetry collection in Filipino. University of the Philippines Institute of Creative Writing and The Freelipiniana Online Library, 2020)
- 재처리 시대 ("Era of Junk". Poetry collection in Korean. 이도훈 (Dohun), 2020.) ISBN 9791189537470
- और उड़ चला मन पांखी ("And Flew Away Heart". Poetry collection in Hindi. Notion Press, India, 2020)
- НОВОГОДИШНО КАПЕЊЕ ("New Year Bath" Mai Văn Phấn with ЗАЧУДЕН БАРУТ ("Buffled Gunpowder") by Raed Anis Al-Yishi. Poetry collection in Macedonian. Center of Culture Aco Karamanov, Radovish, 2020)
- लाल आत्माएं ("The Scarlet Spirits". Poetry collection in Hindi. Hind Yugm, India, 2021)
- Ойнинг туғилган куни ("The Birthday of the Moon". Poetry collection in Uzbek. Arjumand Media, 2021)
- Улетел на рассвете ("Fly Away at Dawn". Poetry collection in Russian. Четыре, Saint Petersburg, 2021)
- Skrottid ("Era of Junk". Poetry collection in Swedish. Tranan, Sweden, 2022). ISBN 9789189175723
- Gün doğarkən ("At Sunrise". Poetry collection in Azerbaijani. Bakı, Azerbaijan, 2022)
- Одлетео у свитање ("Fly Away at Dawn". Poetry collection in Serbian. Центар за културу Врачар, Serbia, 2024)
- Esto dijo una cabra ("The Goat's Words". Poetry collection in Spanish. La Garúa Poesía, Spain, 2024)
- Esto dijo una cabra ("The Goat's Words". Poetry collection in Spanish. Benemérita Universidad Autónoma de Puebla, Mexico, 2024)
- Where the Lava Flows. Poetry collection in English. Independently published, India, 2024)

=== Translated books ===
- Если в дороге ... дождь ... / Nếu trên đường… mưa… ("If on the road… rain...). Bilingual poetry collection in Russian - Vietnamese by Svetlana Savitskaya, translated from Russian into Vietnamese by Mai Văn Phấn. Academy N.E. Zhukovsky, Moscow, 2021). ISBN 9785907490024
- Назови имя Бога / Xưng danh Thiên Chúa ("Say the Name of God"). Bilingual novel in Russian - Vietnamese by Svetlana Savitskaya, translated from Russian into Vietnamese by Mai Văn Phấn. Academy N.E. Zhukovsky, Мoscow, 2023. ISBN 9785907699403
- Giải mã sự dịu dàng ("Puzzles of Tenderness"). Poetry collection in Vietnamese by Valentina Novković, translated from Russian into Vietnamese by Mai Văn Phấn. Publishing House of The Vietnam Writers' Association, 2024

== Awards ==
- Poetry contest of the weekly Người Hà Nội 1994
- Poetry contest of the weekly Văn Nghệ 1995
- Literature of celebrity culture, Nguyễn Bỉnh Khiêm (Hải Phòng city) in 1991, 1993, 1994, 1995
- Vietnam Writers' Association Award 2010
- Cikada Literary Prize of Sweden in 2017
- Award of the Serbian Academy of Sciences and Arts in 2019
- Literary award from the Association of Literary Translators of Montenegro in 2020
- Aco Karamanov Award of North Macedonia in 2020
- 1st Prize at the International Creative Meeting and Festival "Together in the XXI Century" in Bulgaria 2020
- Alisher Navoi medal of the Union of Writers and Historians of Central Asia in 2021
- Sahitto (Bangladesh) International Award for Literature 2021
- Award of the newspaper Kitob Dunyosi (Uzbekistan) in 2021
- Award of the International Slavic Literary Forum "Golden Knight" 2022
- Poetry Collection of the Year Award of the Boao International Poetry Award (China) in 2022 (for Улетел на рассвете)
- Award of the International Poetry Competition "My heart in the Mountains" named after writer William Saroyan (Armenia) in 2022
- Frederick Turner prize of Mundus Artium Press (USA) for poetry in 2023
- Award of the International Literary online Competition "To you, Nesvizh, I dedicate ..." (Belarus) in 2023
- Golden Pen Literature Award of the Russian Federation in 2019, 2020, 2021, 2022, 2023
- Best International Poet and Translator Award 2024, voted by the International Poetry Translation and Research Center of Sichuan Province, China
