= Shin Kyeong-nim =

South Korean writer (1936–2024)

Shin Kyeong-rim
- 신경림
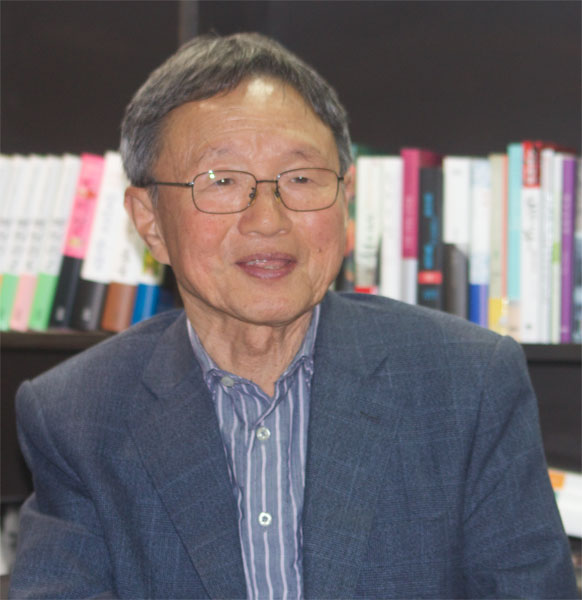
- Shin in 2014
- Born: April 6, 1936; Chūseihoku Province, Korea, Empire of Japan
- Died: May 22, 2024 (aged 88); Ilsan, Goyang, South Korea
- Writing career
- Language: Korean

Korean name
- Hangul: 신경림
- Hanja: 申庚林
- RR: Sin Gyeongrim
- MR: Sin Kyŏngnim

Shin Kyeong-rim (Korean: 신경림; April 6, 1936 – May 22, 2024) was a South Korean writer who was known as a "poet of the people".

== Biography ==
Shin Kyeong-nim was born on April 6, 1936 in Chūseihoku Province, Japanese-ruled Korea. When he was young, Shin Kyong-rim frequented the people of Korea's rural villages and collected the traditional songs they sang. Much of his poetry represents a modernization of things he heard then. Shin Kyeong-nim graduated in English Literature from Dongguk University, from which time he strove to become a creative writer. In 1955 and 1956, he made his formal literary debut with the publication of poems "Day Moon" (Natdal), "Reeds" (Galdae) and "Statue of Stone" (Seoksang). He taught elementary school in his hometown for a period of time, before moving to Seoul to work as an editor for Hyundae munhak and Donghwa Publishers. But his strong desire to create poetry continued.

Shin died from cancer at the National Cancer Centre in Ilsan, on May 22, 2024, at the age of 88.

== Work ==
Shin, widely known as a poet of the people, literally spent decades writing verse on basically one subject: the life and people of Korean farming villages. Although the focus of his debut works, "Reed" (Galdae) and "Graveside Epitaph" (Myobi) is not restricted to the lives of farmers, the bulk of his remaining poems do treat that particular topic. The poems of his first collection, Farmer's Dance (Nongmu, 1975), are coherent in their depiction of the actualities of farming life but retain a certain sense of poetic lyricism that lends them a measure of grace.

While Shin's poetry is largely concerned with farmers and farming villages, he makes a great deal of effort to present them in their full historical and social context. And although he did treat trials and travails of the farmers and village people, the works are usually firmly based in sense of warm and placid emotion. Generally speaking, Shin Gyeongrim's poetry tends to display less of the pent-up anger and violent protest of the workers' poems by other poets, but it does not necessarily follow that Shin's farmer poems hold no significant message. In fact, the farming villages present in most of his poems can easily be understood as symbols for the national community, and, symbols aside, the same grievances that Shin sets forth in his poetry on behalf of his farmers could easily be extended to cover the grievances of the other laboring classes as well, with little to no stretch of the imagination. Always taking the side of the poor and oppressed, Shin displays more of a solemn ideology than a refined artistry, and composes verses reminiscent of folk songs in form and in that they are readily accessible to all readers. Shin actually did borrow some technical elements from traditional Korean folk songs, such as the familiar rhythm of four beats and the patterns of repetition and refrain.

Shin's various poetry collections, such as The Pass (Saejae), A Folksong Travel Diaries (Minyo Gihaeng), The South Han River (Namhangang), and The Path (Gil), further reveal his love of things Korean, and take as their subjects Korean folk songs and places. In particular, the narrative poem "The South Han River" (Namhangang) is an active attempt to observe history with farmers as the protagonists. It is an extensive work that displays an epic scale.

His prizes include the Han Yong-un literature prize, awarded in 1974 for Nongmu (Farmers' dance), the Korean literature writers award in 1981, the Isan literature prize in 1990, and the Ho-Am Prize 2009.

== Works in translation ==
- Variations: Three Korean Poets (3인 시선-사랑의 변주곡)
- Farmers' Dance (농무)
- A love song for the earnest (신경림 시선집)
- 『ラクダに乗って』申庚林詩選集 (신경림 시선집 '낙타를 타고')
- Le rêve d'un homme abattu (쓰러진 자의 꿈)

== Works in Korean (partial) ==
Poetry Collections

- Let's Cross Over the Moon, (Dal neomse, 1985)
- A Poor Love Song (Gananhan salangnolae, 1988)
- Dreams of the Fallen (Sseurujin Ja-ui kkum, 1993.

Collections of Criticism

- The Truth of Life and the Truth of Poetry, (Salmui Jinsilgwa Sijeok Jinsil, 1983)
- Understanding Our Poetry (Uli siui ihae, 1986).

== Awards ==
- Han Yong-un literature prize (1974 for Nongmu (Farmers' dance))
- Korean Literature Writers Award (1981)
- Isan Literature Prize (1990)
- Ho-Am Prize (2009)
