= Conch Awards =

Individual Award

The Conch Awards recognise UK companies and individuals who have made outstanding contributions in the field of audio post production.

The Awards are held annually in London, England and are funded by the UK Screen Association.

The first Conch Awards were held in 2006.

== Categories ==
=== People ===
- Film Re-Recording Mixer of the Year

This award recognises the UK's best re-recording mixer working in film.

- Film Sound Editor of the Year

This award is given to a person based in the UK (i.e. UK resident) that recognises his or her excellence in the field of film. The judging panel will take into consideration a number of factors such as: career and quality of work, contribution to the craft and audio profession. The following professions within the film industry can apply: editor, designer, dialogue editor, supervising sound editor.

- Most Promising Newcomer

This award recognises the most promising new British talent in the audio post-production industry in any field. This person must have been involved in the creative side of the industry for less than 3 years. This award will be determined by the audio committee.

- TV Dubbing Mixer of the Year

This award recognises the UK's best dubbing mixer working in TV.

- Sound Design & Editorial Team

For either film, TV or commercials. This award recognises a company whose predominant activity is in Sound Design and/or editorial. The award will recognise the team and the body of work. For either film, TV or commercials.

- Production Sound Mixer

This award will be presented to the UK's leading production sound mixer.

- TV Sound Recordist

This award recognises the UKs best sound recordist working in TV

- TV Sound Editor of the Year

This award is given to a person based in the UK (i.e. UK resident) that recognises his/her excellence in the field of television. The judging panel will take into consideration a number of factors such as: career and quality of work, contribution to the craft and audio profession.

The following professions within the TV industry can apply: editor, designer, dialogue editor, supervising sound editor.

=== Projects ===
- Audio on TV Drama

The winner of this award will be a programme that has shown audio excellence in TV drama. This category is open to both British and International TV drama providing that the audio post-production has (in full or part) been carried out in the UK.

- Audio on TV Entertainment

The winner of this award will have shown audio excellence in a British or International TV entertainment programme where the audio post-production has (in full or part) been carried out in the UK.

- Audio on TV/Film Documentary

The winner of this award will be a programme that has shown audio excellence in a British or International TV or Film documentary where the audio post-production has (in full or part) been carried out in the UK.

- Film Soundtrack of the Year - over £10 million

This award recognises sound excellence in a high budget feature film (>£10m) where the audio post-production has (in full or part) been carried out in the UK.

- Film Soundtrack of the Year - under £10 million

This award recognises sound excellence in a low budget feature film (<£10m) where the audio post-production has (in full or part) been carried out in the UK.

- Facilities
- Commercial / Promo Facility of the Year

This award will be given to the Commercial/Promo Sound Facility that is deemed to have delivered the most interesting, challenging or creative work throughout the year.

- Film Mix Facility of the Year

This award will be given to the Film Sound Facility that is deemed to have delivered the most interesting, challenging or creative work throughout the year. (It includes ADR, Foley, or mixing studios).

- TV Mix Facility of the Year

This award will be given to the TV Sound Facility that is deemed to have delivered the most interesting, challenging or creative work throughout the year.

== 2006 ==
Category	Winner
Best Audio on a TV Drama – Series	Life on Mars. Hackenbacker
Commercial of The Year	Honda, Choir. Angel Recording Studios / Jungle
Best Film Soundtrack of the Year – under £10m	Kinky Boots. Paul Davies PD Sounddesign
Best Audio on a TV Entertainment Programme	Later... With Jools Holland. Mike Felton
Most Promising Newcomer	Lindsey Green. Sumners
Best ADR/Foley Stage	Goldcrest
Best Audio on a TV Drama – One off	Krakatoa – The Last Days. Hackenbacker
Best UK Sound Editor/Designer	Andy Kennedy
The Audio Media Award for Unsung Hero	Andi Derick and Peter Burgis – Foley artists
Best TV/Film Documentary	Planet Earth. Films at 59 and Wounded Buffalo
The UK Screen Association Fellowship Award	Ray Merrin
Best UK Supervising Sound Editor	Eddy Joseph
Best UK Re-recording Mixer	Mike Prestwood-Smith
Best UK Sound Facility	Boom and De Lane Lea
Best Film Soundtrack – Over £10m	Wallace & Gromit: The Curse of the Were-Rabbit
