= Slovenian Good Toy Award =

Award for special toys

The Slovenian Good Toy Award (Slovene: dobra igrača) is an award given by the Slovenian Ministry of Education to toys meeting four different assessment procedures - toy safety; psycho-educational evaluation; technical and technological evaluation; and adequacy of design and aesthetics - to qualify for a grade of 'good toy'. The recognition is aimed at improving the quality of toys. The award-winning toys are suitable for toddlers and children, and for boys and girls.

The national toy evaluation committee responsible for selection was formed in 1984 and started presenting the Good Toy awards the same year.
