= Ho-Am Prize in Science =

- Description: Award recognizing individuals of Korean heritage who have furthered the welfare of humanity through distinguished accomplishments in the field of science
- Country: South Korea
- Presented by: Ho-Am Foundation / Samsung

The Ho-Am Prize in Science was established in 1990 by Kun-Hee Lee, the Chairman of Samsung, to honour the late Chairman, Lee Byung-chul, the founder of the company. The Ho-Am Prize in Science (previously the Ho-Am Prize in Science & Technology) is one of six prizes awarded annually, covering the five categories of Science, Engineering, Medicine, Arts, and Community Service, plus a Special Prize, which are named after the late Chairman's sobriquet (art-name or pen name), Ho-Am.

The Ho-Am Prize in Science is presented each year, together with the other prizes, to individuals of Korean heritage who have furthered the welfare of humanity through distinguished accomplishments in the field of Science.

== Prizewinners of Ho-Am Prize for Science ==
Source: Ho-Am Foundation

- 1991: Electronics and Telecommunications Research Institute
- 1992: Jihn E. Kim
- 1993: Choong-Ki Kim
- 1994: Sung-Hou Kim
- 1995: Sue-Goo Rhee
- 1996: Won-Yong Lee
- 1997: Hyuk Yu
- 1998: Peter S. Kim
- 1999: Myung-Hwan Whangbo
- 2000: Pill-Soon Song
- 2001: Edward C. Lim
- 2002: Mannque Rho
- 2003: Hongkun Park
- 2004: Hee-Sup Shin
- 2005: Young-Kee Kim
- 2006: Kimoon Kim
- 2007: Sang-Wook Cheong
- 2008: Philip Kim
- 2009: Jun-Muk Hwang
- 2010: Ryoo Ryong
- 2011: Taekjip Ha
- 2012: Minhyong Kim
- 2013: Harold Y. Hwang
- 2014: Hong Gil Nam
- 2015: Cheon Jinwoo
- 2016: Myungshik Kim
- 2017: Sookyung Choi
- 2018: Hee Oh
- 2019: Marvin M. Chun
- 2021: June Huh (Physics and Mathematics)
  Kaang Bong-Kiun (Chemistry and Life Sciences)
- 2022: Yong-Geun Oh (Physics and Mathematics)
  Sukbok Chang (Chemistry and Life Sciences)
- 2023: Jisoon Ihm (Physics and Mathematics)
  Kyoung-Shin Choi (Chemistry and Life Sciences)
- 2024: Sae Woo Nam (Physics and Mathematics)
  Heran Darwin (Chemistry and Life Sciences)
- 2025: Sug Woo Shin (Physics and Mathematics)
  Jongkyeong Chung (Chemistry and Life Sciences)
- 2026: Sung-Jin Oh (Physics and Mathematics)
  Tehshik Yoon (Chemistry and Life Sciences)

== See also ==
- List of general science and technology awards
- Ho-Am Prize in Medicine
- Ho-Am Prize in the Arts
- Ho-Am Prize in Engineering
- Ho-Am Prize in Community Service
- POSCO TJ Park Prize
