= The Weblog Awards (Wizbang) =

Logo

The Weblog Awards, presented by Kevin Aylward's Wizbang LLC, were a set of annual blog awards that were presented beginning in 2003. They were one of the largest blog awards, with winners determined through internet voting by the public, and were covered by many major news organizations. The awards have been described as a "right-wing response to the Bloggies."

The last year of the Weblog Awards was 2008. Owing to the cost of running the project, the awards have been discontinued.
