= Ho-Am Prize in Community Service =

South Korean humanitarian award

- Description: Award recognizing individuals of Korean heritage who have furthered the welfare of humanity through distinguished accomplishments in community service
- Country: South Korea
- Presented by: Ho-Am Foundation / Samsung

The Ho-Am Prize in Community Service was established in 1990 by Kun-Hee Lee, the Chairman of Samsung, to honour the late chairman, Lee Byung-chul, the founder of the company. The Ho-Am Prize in Community Service is one of six prizes awarded annually, covering the five categories of Science, Engineering, Medicine, Arts, and Community Service, plus a Special Prize, which are named after the late chairman's sobriquet (art-name or pen name), Ho-Am.

The Ho-Am Prize in Community Service is presented each year, together with the other prizes, to individuals of Korean heritage who have furthered the welfare of humanity through distinguished accomplishments in the field of Community Service.

== Prizewinners of Ho-Am Prize in Community Service ==
Source: Ho-Am Foundation

- 1991: Chang Kee-ryo
- 1992: Eul-Hee Yu
- 1993: Yong-Sung Kim
- 1994: Im-Soon Kim
- 1995: Kyong-Jae Lee
- 1996: Lois F. Linton
- 1997: Bok-Kyu Yang
- 1998: Sun Tae Kim
- 1999: Marianne Stöger
- 2000: Heide G. Brauckmann
- 2001: Hong Cho Kang
- 2002: Father Didier t'Serstevens
- 2003: Sunwoo Kyung Shik
- 2004: The Sisters of Mary
- 2005: Jee Deuk Yong
- 2006: Yoon Kee
- 2007: Emma Freisinger
- 2008: Holy Family Welfare Hospital
- 2009: Chung Soo Park
- 2010: World Vision Korea
- 2011: Korea Legal Aid Center For Family Relations
- 2012: Dong-han Lee
- 2013: Chong-man Rhee and Hyun-sook Kim
- 2014: Ha-Jong Kim (Bordo Vincenzo)
- 2015: Young-shim Baek
- 2016: Hyun Soo Kim and Soon Sil Cho
- 2017: Raphael Clinic
- 2018: Carla Kang (Lidia Tallone)
- 2019: Love Asia
- 2020: Soung Soo Kim
- 2021: Lee Sungno
- 2022: Heart to Heart Foundation
- 2023: Global Care
- 2024: Geradine Ryan
- 2025: Donghae Kim
- 2026: Dongchan Oh

== See also ==
- Ho-Am Prize in Science
- Ho-Am Prize in the Arts
- Ho-Am Prize in Engineering
- Ho-Am Prize in Medicine
- POSCO TJ Park Prize
