= Blog award =

A blog award is an award for the best blog in a given category. Some blog awards are based on a public vote and others are based on a fixed set of criteria applied by a panel of judges.

Blog awards are a descendant phenomenon from awards given by GeoCities users during the 1990s. These awards had titles such as "Top Site of the Nite" and were bestowed in the form of a gif embedded on the site's guestbook page.

== Process ==
Like film or television awarding committees, blog awards are started by a certain body, usually composed of blog enthusiasts. Since blogging is an Internet activity, most of the process is done online.

Nominees are usually accepted from anyone in the Internet as long as the one who nominates adheres to given policies and procedures. The nominated websites, varying from independent servers to provider hosted are scanned by a selected team of judges.

The filtered nominees are then announced online or by other means such as newspaper or radio stations. Other bloggers or Internet users are given the opportunity to vote for several categories such as Best Single Post, Best Blog Site, Best Design, and others. The winners are announced in a ceremonial night usually held in large venues and online.

There are also blog awards initiated by small groups of bloggers in certain locations. The nomination and selection process is usually the same with major awarding bodies but the awarding is usually less extravagant.

== Major awards ==
Among the major blog awards are The Weblog Awards (Bloggies), and the BOBs (Best of Blogs). The bestower of the BOBs, the German broadcaster Deutsche Welle, describes their awards as "the world’s largest international blog competition". Awarded since 2004, the BOBs are selected by an "international jury of independent journalists, media experts and blog experts".

The Weblog Awards (Wizbang) ran from 2003-2008.

== Defunct awards ==
The UK newspaper The Guardian ran a Best British Blog competition in 2002 and another in 2003, but then stopped because of limited enthusiasm from the UK blogging community and a few public boycotts.
