= The Weblog Awards (Bloggies) =

Blog award

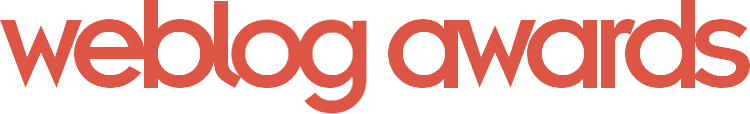

The Weblog Awards, nicknamed the Bloggies, was an annual non-profit blog awards that began in 2001. Until its end in 2015, it was the longest running and one of the largest blog awards, with winners determined through internet voting by the public. The Weblog Awards were presented by Nikolai Nolan, and was covered by many major news organizations.

In 2015, Nolan announced an end to the competition, stating that "Visitor participation has declined to the point where there just aren't enough nominees to form a broad enough spectrum of competition."

== Awards ==
Entries are alphabetical; winners are in bold:

=== 2001 ===
2001 was the first year that the Weblog Awards was held.

==== Culture ====
- Article or essay about weblogs: Deconstructing "You've Got Blog"; Ten Tips For Building A Bionic Weblog; Weblogs: A History and Perspective; **What the Hell Is a Weblog, and Why Won't They Leave Me Alone?**; You've Got Blog.
- Meme: **A Day With(out) Weblogs**; Hiding blog names in source code; The "A-List"; The "Little Girl On a Bike" story
- Web application for weblogs: **Blogger**; BlogVoices; GreyMatter; (Note: Not included in voting at author’s request) Manila; Pitas.com
- Weblog directory or update monitor: Blog.Start; **Blogger**; EatonWeb Portal; SubHonker Filter; Weblogs.com
- Weblog resource: **Blogger**; The Bling Dictionary; Weblog Madness; Weblog Resources FAQ; Weblog, Theory and Practice
- Weblog webring: Aussie Blogs; BlogCanada; BlogPhiles; Linksluts; **Webloggers**

===== Origin =====
- Asian weblog: Daily Bread; GMTPlus9; IritibilitaLog; Poppycock; **Weblog Wannabe**
- Australian or New Zealand weblog: Design Is Kinky; **Loobylu**; Virulent Memes; Waferbaby
- Canadian weblog: 2xy.org=f(ab); Have Browser, Will Travel; Pith and Vinegar; SuccaLand; **Weblog Shmeblog**
- European weblog: Kitsch...; LukeLog; Not.So.Soft; **PlasticBag.org**; Prolific
- Latin American weblog: Eduardo Arcos; PoseidonZone; **Pura Vida**; Rafael Nevarez: Ese Soy Yo; Zamorim

===== Accessory =====
- Designed weblog: EvHead; Kottke..org; **Loobylu**; NoahGreyCom; (Note: Not included in voting at author’s request) Saturn.org
- Non-weblog content of a weblog site: Fairvue Central; Harrumph; WaferBaby; Wetlog;**Zeldman.com**
- Tagline of a weblog: Blogger; Harrumph; MemePool; **MetaFilter: "More addictive than crack"**; Virulent Memes
- Webcam of a weblog site: EvHead; Fairvue Central; Kottke.org; **MegNut**

===== Theme =====
- Computers or technology weblog: Ars Technica; GeekNews; Hack the Planet; Kuro5hin; **Slashdot**
- Temporary or periodic weblog: Born, Eat, Shag, Die: The Mayfly Project; SurvivorBlog; SXSWb; **The 5K**; The Great Blog-Off
- Topical weblog: **Disturbing Search Requests**; Guardian Unlimited: The Weblog; Librarian.net; New York, London, Paris, Munich; U2Log.com
- Weblog about weblogs: Borrowed Blogs; **Haiku the Blog**; MetaCubed; The Dark Ages of Weblogging; Webloglog

===== Character =====
- GLBT weblog: 2xy.org=f(ab); Leather Egg; Must See HTTP; **PlasticBag.org**; Web Queeries
- Humorous weblogs: **Disturbing Search Requests**; Harrumph; RiotHero; Torrez.org; Wetlog
- Group or community weblog: Disturbing Search Requests; MemePool; **MetaFilter**; Slashdot; Web Queeries

===== Process =====
- Blogger-powered weblog: Harrumph; Prolific; Saturn.org; Swallowing Tacks; **/USR/Bin/Girl**
- Manila-powered weblog: **Disturbing Search Requests**; Doc Searls Weblog; Hack the Planet; Q; Scripting News
- PITAS-powered weblog: Catherine's Pita; Deletia; **Openlog**; Ribbit; Wisdom
- Programming of a website: CamWorld; Fairvue Central; Kottke.org; **MetaFilter**; WaferBaby

===== Quality =====
- Best-kept-secret weblog: A Curmudgeon Teaches Statistics; Consolation Champs; Digital Swirlee; Follow Me Here; **Wockerjabby**
- Lifetime achievement: Cameron Barrett; Dave Winer; **Jeffrey Zeldman**; Jorn Barger; Jason Kottke
- New weblog: Lines and Splines; **Little Yellow Different**; Re-run; ThinkDink; Weblog Wannabe
- Weblog of the year: Harrumph; MetaFilter; Not.So.Soft; PlasticBag.org; Saturn.org; **/Usr/Bin/Girl**
