= Giulia Tagliabue =

Italian mechanical engineer

Professor Giulia Tagliabue
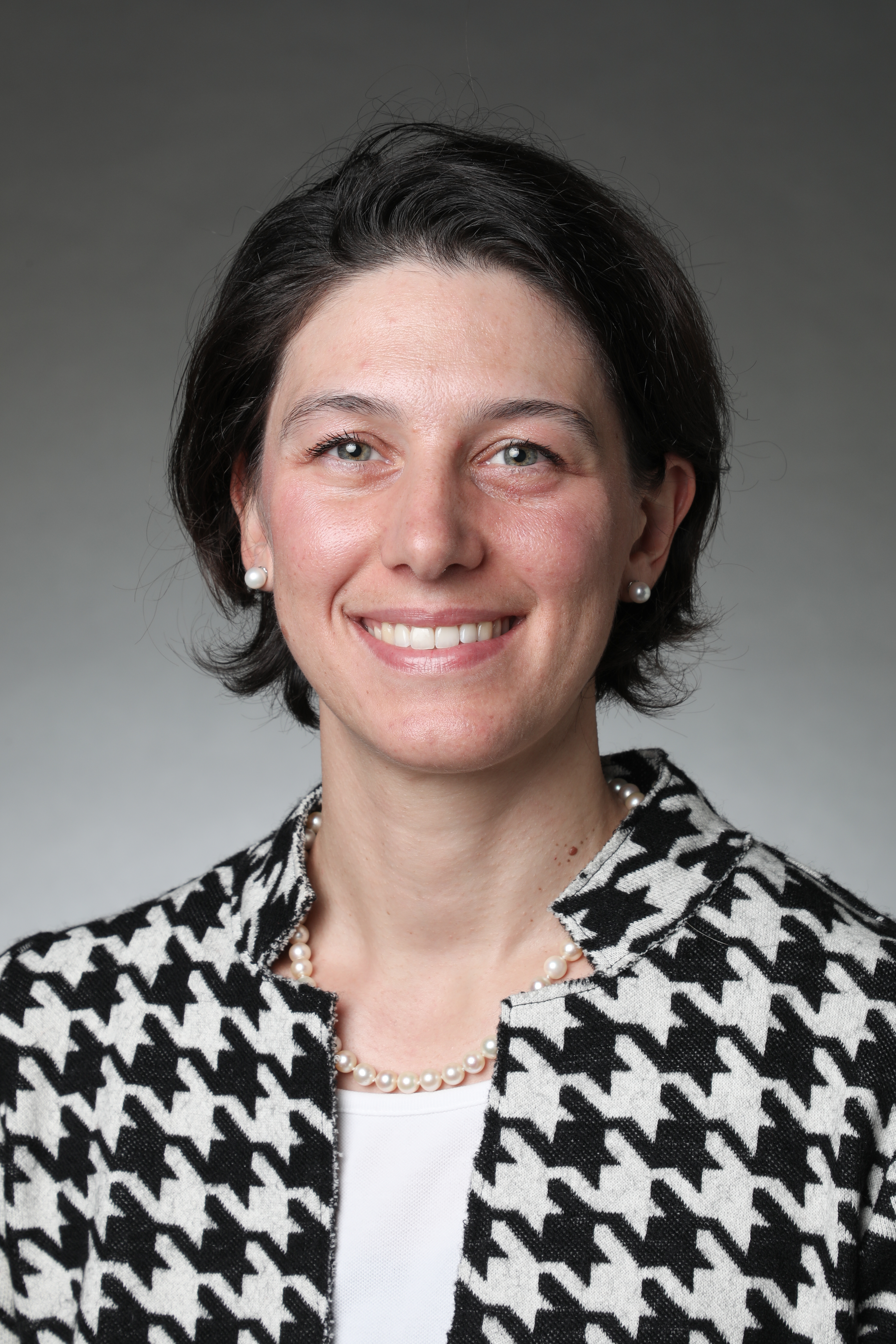
- Giulia Tagliabue in 2020
- Born: 1985 (age 40–41)
- Citizenship: Italy
- Known for: Nanophotonic engineering of perfect light absorbers Plasmonic hot carrier devices

Academic background
- Education: University of Udine; ETH Zurich
- Doctoral advisor: Dimos Poulikakos
- Other advisor: Harry Atwater

Academic work
- Institutions: EPFL (École Polytechnique Fédérale de Lausanne)
- Main interests: Nanophotonics; Energy devices

Giulia Tagliabue (born 1985) is an Italian engineer specialized in nanophotonics. She is a professor at EPFL's (École Polytechnique Fédérale de Lausanne) School of Engineering, where she leads the Laboratory of Nanoscience for Energy Technologies (LNET).

== Career ==
Tagliabue studied mechanical engineering at University of Udine and received her Master degree in 2009. The same year, she also received a Diploma from the School of Advanced Studies at the University of Udine. In 2009, she joined John Thome's laboratory at EPFL as a research assistant and then in 2010 moved to ETH Zurich to work as a graduate student with Dimos Poulikakos. She obtained a PhD in mechanical engineering in 2015 with a thesis on nanophotonic engineering for energy devices. Her work resulted in the measurement of the effect of plasmon absorption on the metal band-structure, the elucidation of the benefits of plasmonic absorbers for fast sensing devices, and the study of light-confinement in nano gap structures.

In 2015, Tagliabue joined Harry Atwater's group at Caltech as a postdoc researcher. Concurrently, she also joined the Joint Center for Artificial Photosynthesis. Here, her work focused on the fundamental understanding and proof of concept demonstration of plasmonic hot carrier devices for photodetection and photoelectrochemistry. In particular, she contributed to advancing the use of plasmonic hot carriers for solar fuels generation and she pioneered the development of plasmonic hot-hole devices. Among her results are the realization of a plasmonic photocathode for CO_{2} reduction in aqueous solution, the clarification of the role of the metal band structure and ballistic transport for hot carrier collection, the demonstration of plasmonic hot-hole photodetectors in the visible spectrum, in particular proving the feasibility of copper-based systems, the investigation of hot hole injection probability, and the analysis of thermalisation of hot electrons upon hot hole removal.

Since 2019 she has been Assistant Professor in the Institute of Mechanical Engineering at EPFL, where she leads the Laboratory of Nanoscience for Energy Technologies (LNET).

== Research ==
Tagliabue's research group focuses on the fundamental understanding and the proof-of-concept development of experimental devices for light-energy harnessing, conversion and storage. In particular, they study nanophotonic strategies to couple light to molecular dimensions and achieve control of charge-transfer, ion-transport and heat-generation processes. In 2020, they reported an ultra-broadband and omnidirectional perfect light absorber based on copper nanowire and carbon nanotube hierarchical structure, which could be employed as anti-reflective coating but also as photoelectrode for solar fuels. The same year they also demonstrated the importance of self-induced heating effects in dielectric nanoresonators.

== Distinctions ==
In 2020, Tagliabue was one of the recipients of the SNSF Eccellenza Grant. The same year she was awarded the Rising Star of Light Award 2020 (first prize) by the journal Light: Science & Applications. She received the SNSF Advanced Postdoc Mobility Fellowship (2016) and the SNSF Early Postdoc Mobility Fellowship (2014). She is a board member of the WISH Foundation, and a committee member of the OSA Optics for Energy Technical Group.

== Selected works ==
- Tsoulos, Ted V.; Tagliabue, Giulia (2020). "Self-induced thermo-optical effects in silicon and germanium dielectric nanoresonators". Nanophotonics. 9 (12): 3849–3861. Bibcode:2020Nanop...9..534T. doi:10.1515/nanoph-2019-0534. S2CID 219100024. Wikidata Q105745774.
- Tagliabue, Giulia; Duchene, Joseph S.; Abdellah, Mohamed; et al. (2020). "Ultrafast hot-hole injection modifies hot-electron dynamics in Au/p-GaN heterostructures". Nature Materials. 19 (12): 1312–1318. arXiv:1810.04238. Bibcode:2020NatMa..19.1312T. doi:10.1038/s41563-020-0737-1. PMID 32719510. S2CID 220809028. Wikidata Q97905698.
- Tagliabue, Giulia; Duchene, Joseph S.; Habib, Adela; Sundararaman, Ravishankar; Atwater, Harry A. (2020). "Hot Hole versus Hot Electron Transport at Copper/GaN Heterojunction Interfaces". ACS Nano. 14 (5): 5788–5797. doi:10.1021/acsnano.0c00713. PMID 32286797. S2CID 215774030. Wikidata Q91895577.
- Tagliabue, Giulia; Jermyn, Adam S.; Sundararaman, Ravishankar; Welch, Alex J.; Duchene, Joseph S.; Pala, Ragip; Davoyan, Artur R.; Narang, Prineha; Atwater, Harry A. (2018). "Quantifying the role of surface plasmon excitation and hot carrier transport in plasmonic devices". Nature Communications. 9 (1): 3394. arXiv:1708.02187. Bibcode:2018NatCo...9.3394T. doi:10.1038/s41467-018-05968-x. PMC 6107582. PMID 30140064. Wikidata Q58714462.
- Duchene, Joseph S.; Tagliabue, Giulia; Welch, Alex J.; Cheng, Wen-Hui; Atwater, Harry A. (2018). "Hot Hole Collection and Photoelectrochemical CO2 Reduction with Plasmonic Au/p-GaN Photocathodes". Nano Letters. 18 (4): 2545–2550. Bibcode:2018NanoL..18.2545D. doi:10.1021/acs.nanolett.8b00241. OSTI 1469320. PMID 29522350. S2CID 3928552. Wikidata Q51742220.
- Sá, Jacinto; Tagliabue, Giulia; Friedli, Peter; Szlachetko, Jakub; Rittmann-Frank, Mercedes H.; Santomauro, Fabio G.; Milne, Christopher J.; Sigg, Hans (2013). "Direct observation of charge separation on Au localized surface plasmons". Energy & Environmental Science. 6 (12): 3584. doi:10.1039/c3ee42731e. S2CID 97444659. Wikidata Q59410874.
- Tagliabue, Giulia; Eghlidi, Hadi; Poulikakos, Dimos (2013). "Facile multifunctional plasmonic sunlight harvesting with tapered triangle nanopatterning of thin films" (PDF). Nanoscale. 5 (20): 9957–9962. Bibcode:2013Nanos...5.9957T. doi:10.1039/c3nr03273f. PMID 23989122. S2CID 26468781. Wikidata Q46621738.
