= Shelley Claridge =

American chemist and academic

Shelley Ann Claridge
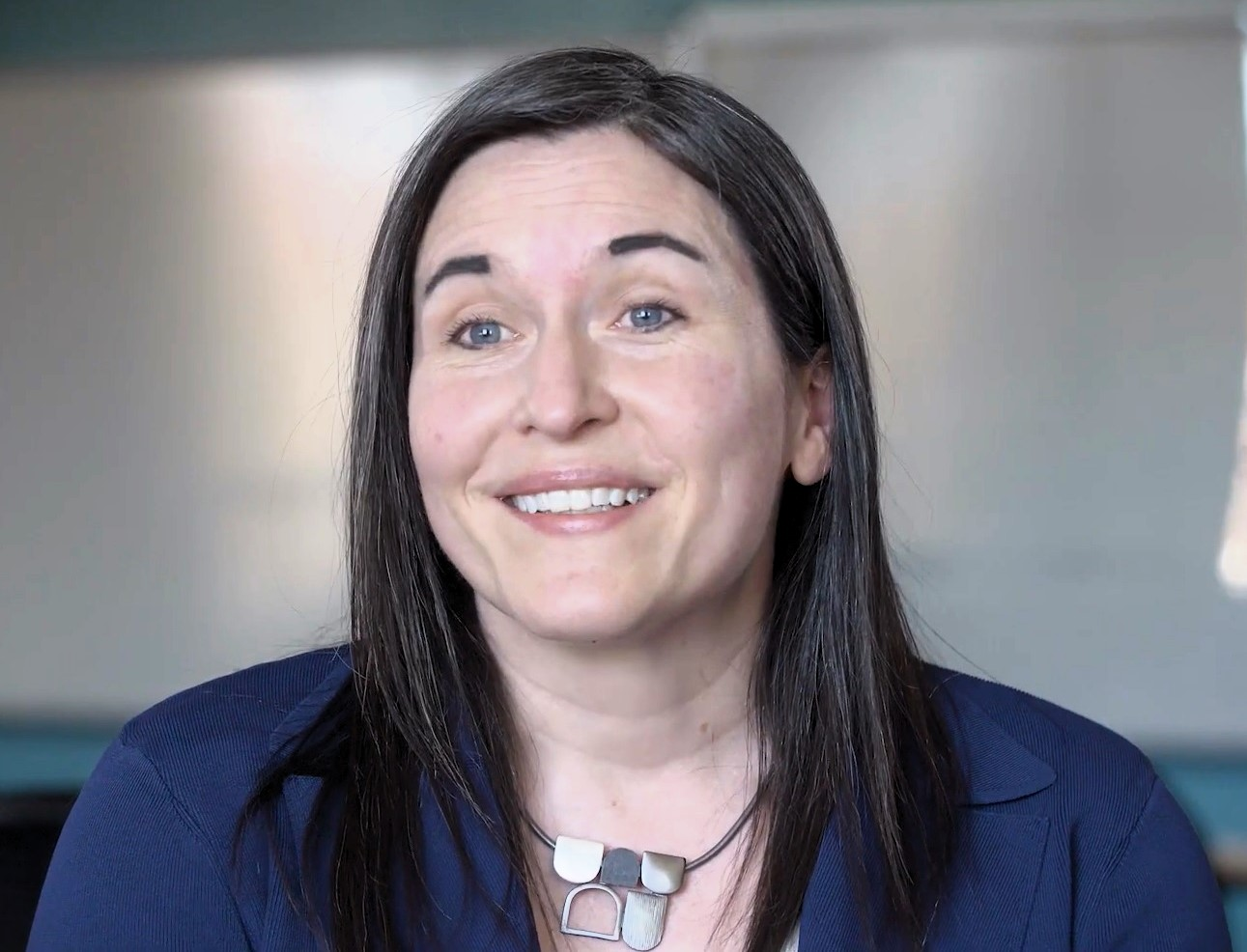
- Claridge in 2021
- Education: University of California, Berkeley
- Scientific career
- Workplaces: University of California, Los Angeles; Pennsylvania State University; Purdue University
- Thesis: Nanocrystal bioassembly : asymmetry, proximity, and enzymatic manipulation (2008)
- Website: Claridge Lab

Shelley Claridge is an American chemist who is an associate professor of chemistry at Purdue University. Her research considers the design of nanostructured materials and better understanding their physical and chemical properties. She was awarded a Schmidt Science Polymaths Award in 2022 and the American Chemical Society Women Chemists Committee Rising Star Award in 2023.

== Early life and education ==
Claridge says that her first experiment was baking bread with her mother. She studied mathematics and biochemistry at Texas A&M University. After graduating, she spent several years as a software engineer, before deciding that she wanted to pursue an academic career. moved to the University of California, Berkeley for her doctoral research, where she worked with Jean Fréchet and Paul Alivisatos. After earning her doctorate, Claridge joined Pennsylvania State University as a postdoctoral researcher with Paul Weiss.

== Research and career ==
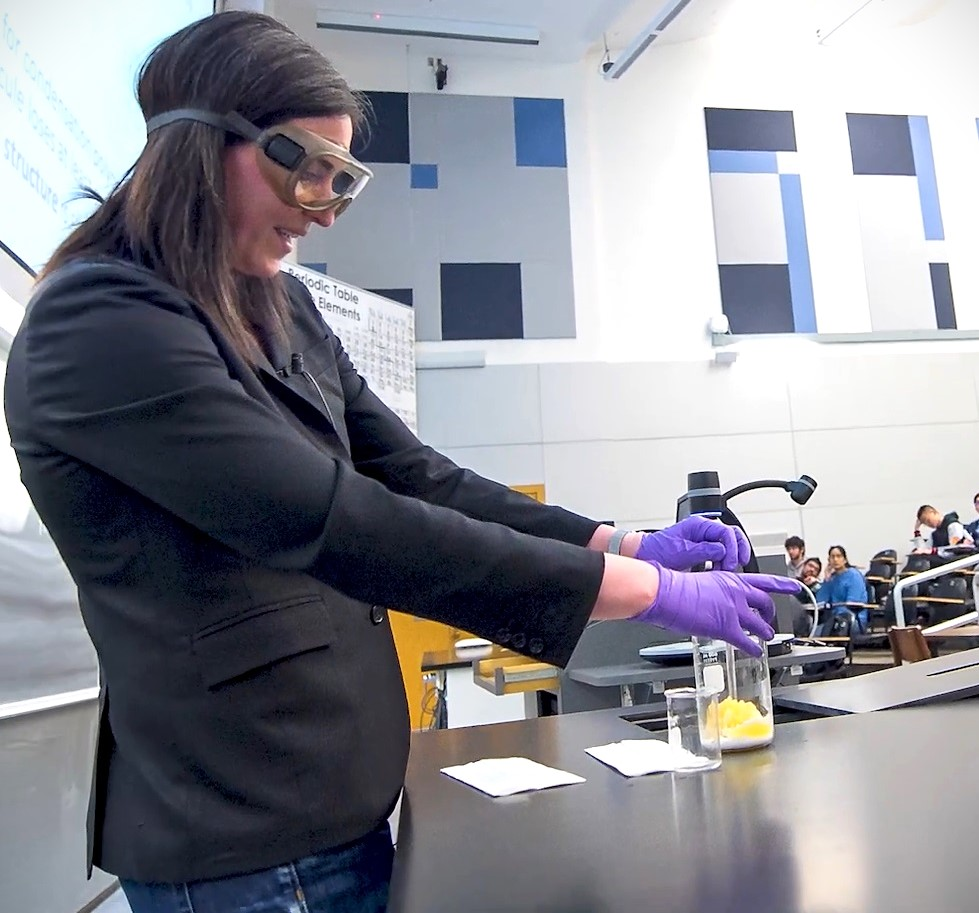
Claridge at a 2021 chemistry lecture at Purdue's College of Science

In 2013, Claridge joined Purdue University as an assistant professor, and was promoted to associate professor in 2019. Claridge is a physical chemist who works on the design of new materials and understanding how confinement impacts materials properties. In particular, she looks to recreate the structural diversity and function demonstrated in biology. Her group investigated plant membranes, and used their precise nanostructure to create efficient circuits of photovoltaic cells. Claridge developed a robust strategy to pattern materials based on amphiphilic striped phases, which can be assembled on 2D materials for soft-electronics.

== Awards and honors ==
- 2016 National Science Foundation CAREER Award
- 2016 DuPont Young Professor Award
- 2019 DARPA Director's Fellowship
- 2020 ACS Nano iCANX Rising Star Lecturer
- 2021 Charles B. Murphy Award for Undergraduate Teaching
- 2022 Schmidt Science Polymaths Award
- 2023 American Chemical Society Women Chemists Committee Rising Star Award

== Selected publications ==
- Shelley A Claridge; A W Castleman; Shiv N Khanna; Christopher B Murray; Ayusman Sen; Paul Weiss (1 February 2009). "Cluster-assembled materials". ACS Nano. 3 (2): 244–255. doi:10.1021/nn800820e. ISSN 1936-0851. PMID 19236057. Wikidata Q53515867.
- Alexander J Mastroianni; Shelley A Claridge; Paul Alivisatos (1 June 2009). "Pyramidal and chiral groupings of gold nanocrystals assembled using DNA scaffolds". Journal of the American Chemical Society. 131 (24): 8455–8459. doi:10.1021/ja808570g. ISSN 0002-7863. PMC 2767249. PMID 19331419. Wikidata Q37399351.
- Haimei Zheng; Shelley A Claridge; Andrew M Minor; Paul Alivisatos; Ulrich Dahmen (1 June 2009). "Nanocrystal diffusion in a liquid thin film observed by in situ transmission electron microscopy". Nano Letters. 9 (6): 2460–2465. doi:10.1021/nl9012369. ISSN 1530-6984. PMID 19408927. Wikidata Q33437822.
