= Jennifer Dionne =

American physicist and materials scientist

Jennifer Anne Dionne
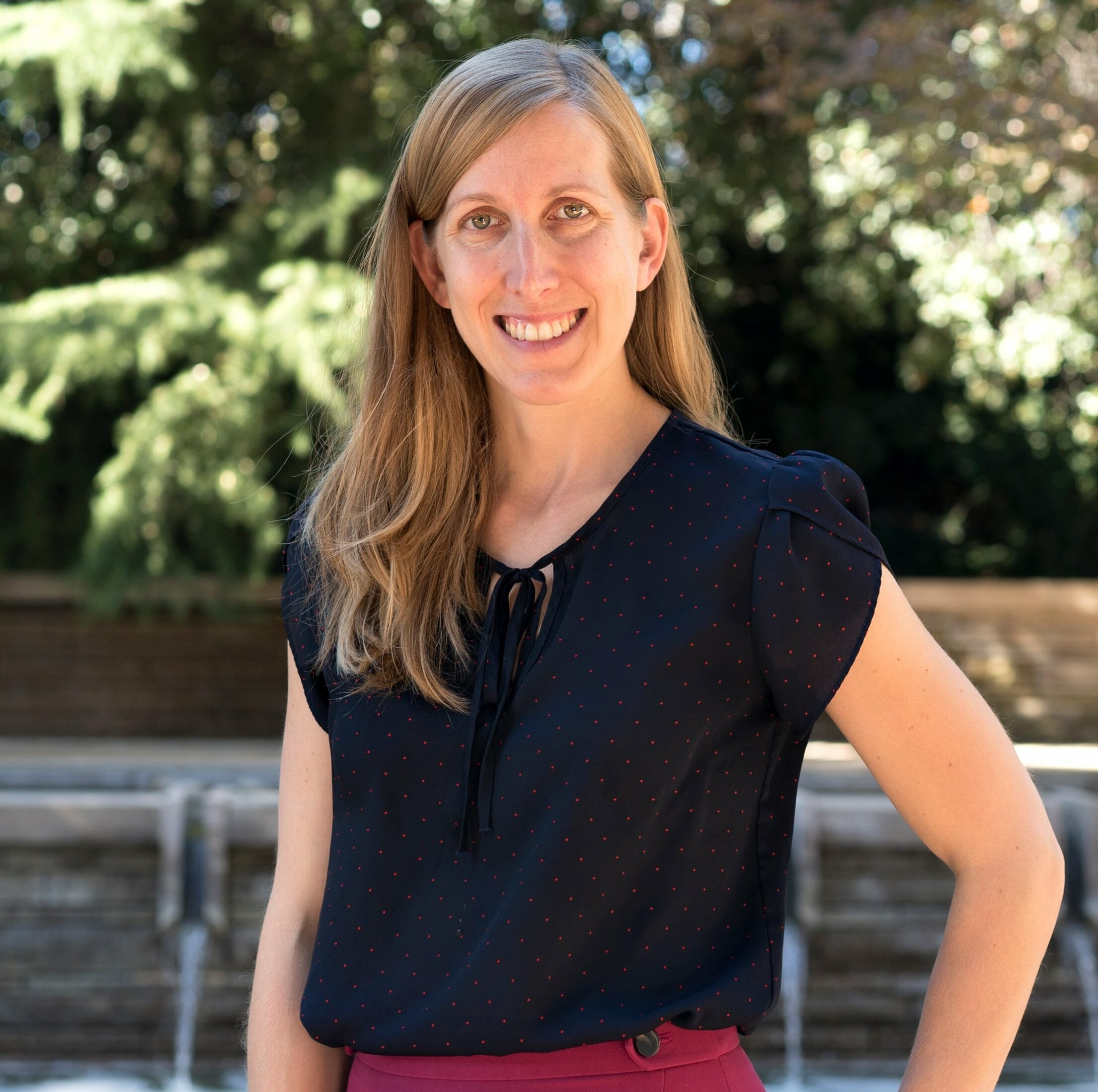
- Dionne in 2019
- Citizenship: American
- Education: California Institute of Technology (MS, PhD); Washington University (BS)
- Scientific career
- Fields: Physics, Materials Science, Radiology
- Workplaces: Stanford University
- Thesis: Flatland Photonics: Circumventing Diffraction with Planar Plasmonic Architectures (2009, Awarded Francis and Milton Clauser Prize for best Caltech PhD thesis)
- Doctoral advisor: Harry Atwater

Jennifer (Jen) Dionne is an American scientist and pioneer of nanophotonics. She is currently full professor of materials science and engineering at Stanford University and by courtesy, of radiology, and also a Chan Zuckerberg Biohub Investigator. She is deputy director of Q-NEXT, a National Quantum Information Science funded by the DOE. From 2020 to 2024, she served as Stanford's inaugural Vice Provost of Shared Facilities, where she advanced funding, infrastructure, education, and staff support within shared facilities. During this time, she also was Director of the Department of Energy's "Photonics at Thermodynamic Limits" Energy Frontier Research Center (EFRC), which strives to create thermodynamic engines driven by light. She is also an editor of the ACS journal Nano Letters. Dionne's research develops photonic materials and methods to observe and control chemical and biological processes as they unfold with nanometer scale resolution, emphasizing critical challenges in global health and sustainability.

== Early life and education ==
Dionne was born October 28, 1981, in Warwick, Rhode Island, to Sandra Dionne (Draper), an intensive care unit nurse, and George Dionne, a cabinet maker. She grew up figure skating, but also enjoyed science and math. As a student at Bay View Academy, she was selected to be a student ambassador to Australia. She also participated in the Washington University Summer Scholars Program and the Harvard University Secondary School Program.

She attended Washington University in St. Louis, where she received bachelor's degrees in physics and systems science and mathematics in 2003. There, she served on the Mission Control of Steve Fosset's first attempted solo hot air balloon circumnavigation. She also worked as student lead of the Crow Observatory.

She then received her master's and doctoral degrees in Applied Physics from Caltech in 2009, advised by Harry Atwater. At Caltech, she was named an Everhart Lecturer, and awarded the Francis and Milton Clauser Prize for Best Ph.D. Thesis, recognizing her work developing the first negative refractive index material at visible wavelengths and nanoscale Si-based photonic modulators. Before starting her faculty position at Stanford, she spent a year as a postdoctoral fellow in Chemistry at Berkeley and Lawrence Berkeley National Lab, advised by Paul Alivisatos.

== Career ==
Dionne began as an assistant professor at Stanford in March, 2010. In 2016, she was promoted to associate professor, and became an affiliate faculty of the Wu Tsai Neuroscience Institute, Bio-X, and the Precourt Institute for Energy. In 2019, she joined the department of radiology as a courtesy faculty. In 2019–2021, she was director of the TomKat Center for Sustainable Energy, and initiated their graduate student fellowship. In 2020, she became a senior fellow of the Precourt Institute and was appointed senior associate vice provost for shared facilities/research platforms. In her vice provost role, she helped Stanford to modernize shared research facilities across the schools of engineering, medicine, humanities and sciences, earth sciences, and SLAC. She initiated the Community for Shared Research Platforms (c-ShaRP), which has enabled improved education, instrumentation, organization, staffing, and translational efforts in the shared facilities.

In her research, Dionne is a pioneer in manipulating light at the atomic and molecular scale. Under Dionne's leadership, her lab helped to establish the field of quantum plasmonics. She also made critical contributions to the field of plasmon photocatalysis, including developing combined optical and environmental electron microscopy to image chemical transformations with near-atomic-scale resolution. Her work in plasmon catalysis could enable sustainable materials manufacturing, overturning the traditional trade-offs in thermal catalysis between selectivity and activity. Her group is also credited with developing the first high-quality-factor phase-gradient metasurfaces for resonant beam-shaping and beam-steering. Dionne uses this platform to detect pathogens, and view the intricacies of molecular-to-cellular structure, binding, and dynamics.

== Awards ==
- In 2011, MIT Technology Review Top Innovator under 35
- In 2012, Washington University in St. Louis Outstanding Young Alum Award
- In 2013, Oprah's 50 Things That Will Make You Say "Wow!"
- In 2014, the Presidential Early Career Award for Scientists and Engineers given by President Barack Obama
- In 2015, the Sloan Research Fellowship
- In 2015, the Dreyfus Teacher-Scholar Award
- In 2016, the Adolph Lomb Medal from Optica/the Optical Society of America
- In 2017, the Moore Inventor's Fellowship
- In 2019, the NIH Director's New Innovator Award
- In 2019, the Alan T. Waterman Award for top US Scientist under 40, National Science Foundation
- In 2021, a Fellow of The Optical Society

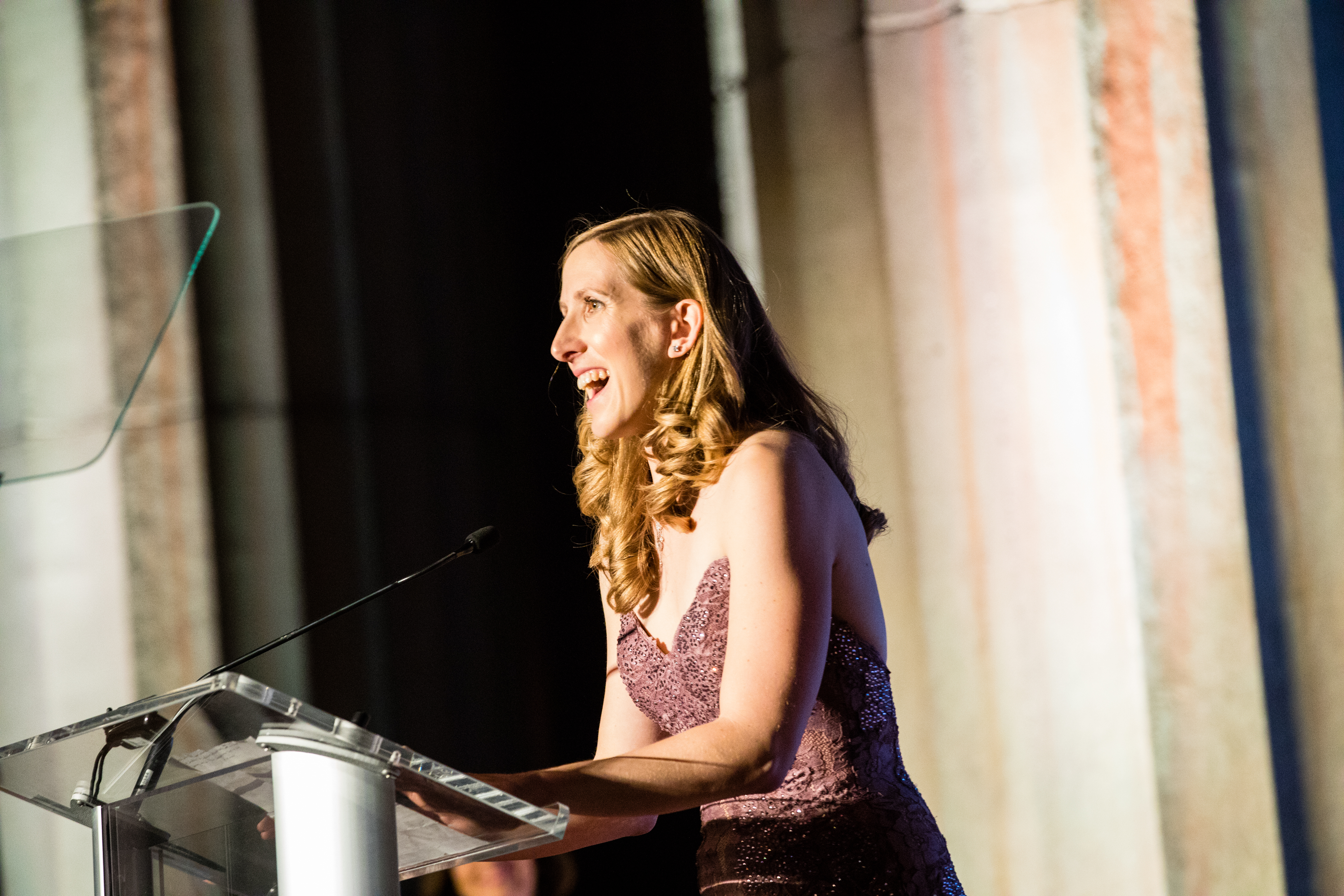
Dionne at the 2019 NSF Gala

== Patents ==
Patents include:

- Metal Oxide Si field effect plasmonic modulator
- Quantum converting nanoparticles as electrical field sensors
- Method and structure for plasmonic optical trapping of nanoscale particles
- Slot waveguide for color display
- Direct detection of nucleic acids and proteins
- Multiplexed nanophotonic microarray biosensor
- A method for compact and low-cost vibrational spectroscopy platforms
