= Julie Biteen =

American chemist and professor

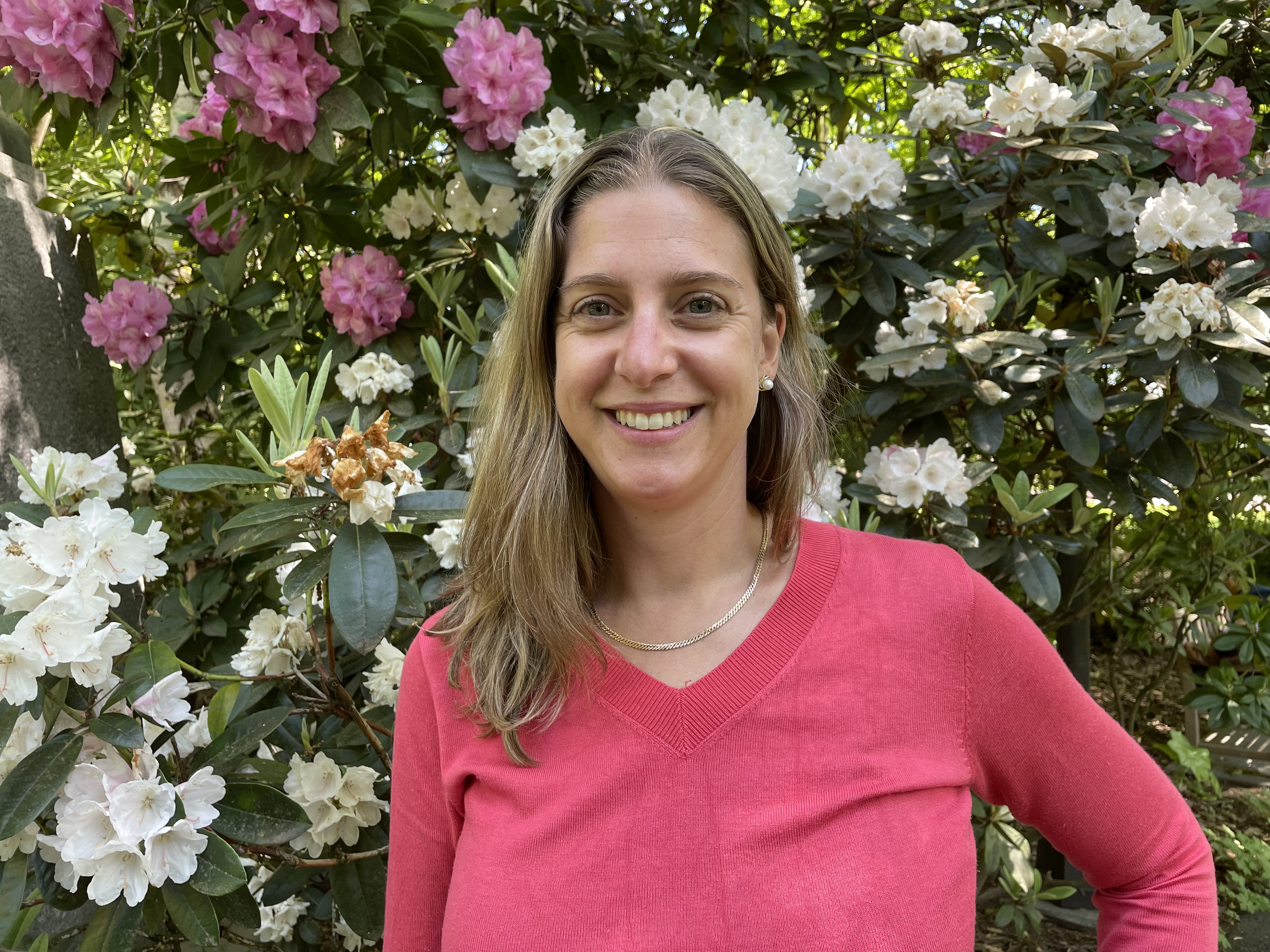
- Julie Biteen in the Grieg garden on the campus of the University of Washington, Seattle in 2022
- Born: Julie Suzanne Biteen
- Education: Caltech (M.S., Ph.D.); Princeton University (A.B.)
- Awards: Margaret Oakley Dayhoff Award (2017)
- Scientific career
- Institutions: Stanford University (2006–2009); University of Michigan (2010–)
- Thesis: Plasmon-Enhanced Silicon Nanocrystal Luminescence for Optoelectronic Applications (2006)
- Doctoral advisor: Harry Atwater (Applied Physics); Nathan Lewis (Chemistry)

Julie Suzanne Biteen is a Canadian-born American chemist who is professor of chemistry and biophysics at the University of Michigan. Her research considers the development of imaging systems for biological systems. She was named the Stanford University Sessler Distinguished Alumni Lecturer in 2021.

== Early life and education ==
Biteen was born in Montreal. Her father worked in Human Resources and her mother was a librarian. As a child, she enjoyed mathematics and thought that she might become a civil engineer. During her undergraduate studies, she became fascinated by fundamental scientific research. Biteen majored in chemistry at Princeton University and conducted research under the supervision of Hershel Rabitz by investigating maps for quantum control. After completing her bachelor's degree, she moved to the California Institute of Technology (Caltech), where she earned a master's in applied physics and completed her doctoral research with Harry Atwater and Nathan Lewis. In her doctoral research, she investigated nanoparticle plasmonics and quantum dot optoelectronics. She joined Stanford University as a postdoctoral scholar, where she used super-resolution imaging with William E. Moerner. As a postdoc, she developed photoactivated localization microscopy systems to image Caulobacter crescentus, acquiring the first images of MreB, a protein found in bacteria.

== Research and career ==
Biteen was appointed to the faculty at the University of Michigan in 2010. She investigates microbial cell biology using advanced imaging techniques such as single-molecule and super-resolution imaging. In particular, single-molecule microscopy can provide nanoscale information about biological processes. She has used these techniques to understand how proteins recognise and bind histones during transcriptional silencing and to reveal information about the gut microbiome. At the same time she has studied how plasmonic metal nanoantennas reshape the fluorescence of nearby molecules.

== Awards and honors ==
- 2009 University of Michigan Biological Sciences Scholar
- 2009 Burroughs Wellcome Fund Career Award
- 2013 National Science Foundation CAREER Award
- 2015 Moore Foundation Scialog Fellow
- 2016 Journal of Physical Chemistry B Lectureship Award
- 2017 Biophysical Society Margaret Oakley Dayhoff Award
- 2020 NSF Award for Special Creativity
- 2021 Sessler Distinguished Alumni Lectureship at Stanford
- 2023 University of Michigan Faculty Recognition Award
- 2026 University of Michigan Rackham Distinguished Mentoring Award

== Selected publications ==
- Sri Rama Prasanna Pavani; Michael A Thompson; Julie S Biteen; Samuel J Lord; Na Liu; Robert J Twieg; Rafael Piestun; W E Moerner (11 February 2009). "Three-dimensional, single-molecule fluorescence imaging beyond the diffraction limit by using a double-helix point spread function". Proceedings of the National Academy of Sciences of the United States of America. 106 (9): 2995–2999. Bibcode:2009PNAS..106.2995P. doi:10.1073/PNAS.0900245106. ISSN 0027-8424. PMC 2651341. PMID 19211795. Wikidata Q33408484.
- Julie S Biteen; Michael A Thompson; Nicole K Tselentis; Grant R Bowman; Lucy Shapiro; W E Moerner (15 September 2008). "Super-resolution imaging in live Caulobacter crescentus cells using photoswitchable EYFP". Nature Methods. 5 (11): 947–949. doi:10.1038/NMETH.1258. ISSN 1548-7091. PMC 2655310. PMID 18794860. Wikidata Q37127433.
- Julie S. Biteen; Domenico Pacifici; Nathan S Lewis; Harry A Atwater (1 September 2005). "Enhanced radiative emission rate and quantum efficiency in coupled silicon nanocrystal-nanostructured gold emitters". Nano Letters. 5 (9): 1768–1773. doi:10.1021/NL051207Z. ISSN 1530-6984. PMID 16159221. Wikidata Q44708121.
