= Vivian Ferry =

American nanophotonics researcher

Vivian Eleanor Ferry is an American researcher in nanophotonics and nanoplasmonics. Her research combines the use of colloidal chemistry to synthesize light-sensitive nanostructures, the use of techniques from materials science to characterize the properties of the resulting metamaterials, and their integration into optoelectronic devices and solar cells. She is a professor at the University of Minnesota, in its Department of Chemical Engineering and Materials Science, and director of graduate studies in materials science and engineering.

== Education and career ==
Ferry was an undergraduate at the University of Chicago, where she received a bachelor's degree in 2006. She continued her studies at the California Institute of Technology, and completed her Ph.D. there in 2011. Her doctoral dissertation, Light Trapping in Plasmonic Solar Cells, was supervised by Harry Atwater, and included research performed in the Netherlands at AMOLF and at Utrecht University.

Before joining the University of Minnesota faculty, she was a postdoctoral researcher at the Lawrence Berkeley National Laboratory and University of California, Berkeley, from 2011 to 2014.

== Recognition ==
Ferry's doctoral research on plasmonic solar cells won Caltech's Demetriades – Tsafka – Kokkalis Prize in Entrepreneurship. In 2016, she was named as an Air Force Office of Scientific Research Young Investigator and as a National Science Foundation Young Investigator.

She was one of five recipients of the 2019 Marion Milligan Mason Award for Women in the Chemical Sciences of the American Association for the Advancement of Science, and was the recipient of the 2020 SPIE Early Career Achievement Award – Academic Focus.

She was elected as an Optica Fellow, in the 2027 class of fellows, "for outstanding research on optical materials and light management for solar energy conversion".
