= Galen D. Stucky =

American chemist

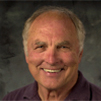
- Born: December 17, 1936 (age 89)
- Education: Iowa State University Ph.D. (1962)
- Scientific career
- Workplaces: University of California, Santa Barbara DuPont Central Research and Development; Sandia National Laboratory; University of Illinois at Urbana-Champaign Massachusetts Institute of Technology
- Thesis: Molecular Configurations of Some of the Solvated Compounds of the Grignard System ProQuest 288095659 (1962)
- Doctoral advisor: Robert E. Rundle
- Other academic advisors: Clifford G. Shull
- Doctoral students: Jerry L. Atwood; Angela Belcher; Shannon W. Boettcher; Tina Nenoff
- Other notable students: Kyoung-Shin Choi (postdoc); Sarah Tolbert (postdoc); Peidong Yang (postdoc)
- Website: www.chem.ucsb.edu/people/galen-stucky

Galen D. Stucky (born 17 December 1936) is an American inorganic materials chemist who is a Distinguished Professor and the Essam Khashoggi Chair In Materials Chemistry at the University of California, Santa Barbara. He is noted for his work with porous ordered mesoporous materials such as SBA-15. He won the Prince of Asturias Award in 2014, in the Scientific and Technological Research area. Stucky was elected a member of the American Association for the Advancement of Science in 1994, a member of the American Academy of Arts and Sciences in 2005, and a member of the National Academy of Sciences in 2013.

== Early life and education ==
Stucky was born on December 17, 1936, in McPherson, Kansas. He graduated with a Bachelor's of Science degree at McPherson College in 1957. Stucky pursued graduate studies at Iowa State University, where he worked under Prof. Robert E. Rundle on the synthesis and characterization of the diethyl ether-solvated phenylmagnesium bromide Grignard reagent, and an oxidation product formed from its exposure to oxygen. Stucky received his PhD in physical chemistry in 1962. From 1962 to 1963, he was a postdoctoral associate in the Department of Physics at the Massachusetts Institute of Technology under Prof. Clifford G. Shull.

== Career ==
Stucky began his independent academic career in 1964 as an assistant professor at the University of Illinois at Urbana-Champaign (UIUC), and was promoted to full professor in 1972. In 1980, he left UIUC to work at Sandia National Laboratory in Albuquerque, New Mexico, where he led the Solid State Materials Group there. From 1981 to 1985, he worked at the Central Research and Development Laboratory of E. I. du Pont de Nemours & Co. in Wilmington, Delaware, where he was a group and research leader.

In 1985, Stucky joined the faculty of the University of California, Santa Barbara. He is the E. Khashoggi Industries, LLC Professor in Letters and Science, Professor in the Department of Chemistry and Biochemistry (College of Letters and Science), Professor in the Materials Department (College of Engineering), and a member of the Interdepartmental Program in Biochemistry and Molecular Biology.

== Notability ==
Stucky has been ranked in the top five most-cited materials scientists in the world, according to Thomson Scientific's in-cites publication (more than 80 publications with over 60 citations). According to another publication by Thomson in late 2006, his work involving SBA was the most-cited paper in the Journal of the American Chemical Society. In 2007 his Hirsch index rating ranked in the top 40 among living chemists, and he was ranked in the top 30 most-cited scientists in chemistry by in-cites in late 2007. In June 2008, Sciencewatch.com featured "Mesoporous Materials" as a Special Topics analysis publication. He contributed research in the development of QuikClot, a lifesaving blood clotting drug with military and civilian applications.

He is also the co-chair of the Scientific Advisory Board of the Institute of Bioengineering and Nanotechnology (IBN), A*STAR, Singapore which is headed by Jackie Y. Ying (Executive Director of IBN and adjunct professor of chemical engineering at MIT).

== Research group ==
Alumni of Stucky's research group include Angela Belcher of MIT, Peidong Yang at UC Berkeley, Dongyuan Zhao at Fudan University, Yiying Wu at Ohio State, Kyong-Shin Choi at Wisconsin and Shannon Boettcher at the University of Oregon among many other notable scientists. In late 2006, former and current group members and colleagues gathered for a Symposium on Recent Advances in Nanoscale Materials Research at UCSB to celebrate Stucky's 70th birthday. The event was hosted by CNSI (Elings Hall) at UCSB.
