= Teri W. Odom =

American chemist and materials scientist

- Born: c. 1974 (age 51–52)
- Education: Stanford University; Harvard University
- Known for: Nanoscience; Nanotechnology
- Scientific career
- Fields: Chemistry, materials science
- Workplaces: Northwestern University
- Thesis: Electronic Properties of single-walled carbon nanotubes (2001)
- Doctoral advisor: Charles M. Lieber, George M. Whitesides

Teri W. Odom is an American chemist and materials scientist. She is the chair of the chemistry department, the Joan Husting Madden and William H. Madden, Jr. Professor of Chemistry, and a professor of materials science and engineering at Northwestern University. She is affiliated with the university's International Institute for Nanotechnology, Chemistry of Life Processes Institute, Northwestern Initiative for Manufacturing Science and Innovation, Interdisciplinary Biological Sciences Graduate Program, and department of applied physics.

== Education ==
Odom attended Stanford University, where she earned a BS in chemistry, was elected to Phi Beta Kappa, and received the Standford's Marsden Memorial Prize for Chemistry Research (1996). She obtained her PhD in chemical physics from Harvard University in 2001 under the guidance of Charles M. Lieber, then conducted post-doctoral research at Harvard with George M. Whitesides from 2001 to 2002.

== Career ==
Odom joined Northwestern University's department of chemistry in 2002 and became the department chair in 2018. In 2010, she became the founding chair of the Noble Metal Nanoparticles Gordon Research Conference Between 2016 and 2018, she was associate director of the International Institute for Nanotechnology. Odom has worked on the editorial advisory boards of ACS Nano, Bioconjugate Chemistry, Materials Horizons, Annual Review of Physical Chemistry Natural Sciences, Nano Futures, and Accounts of Chemical Research. Odom became an inaugural associate editor for Royal Society of Chemistry's Chemical Science journal in 2009, a position she held until 2013. She was on the editorial advisory board of Nano Letters beginning in 2010 and became editor-in-chief in 2019. In 2013, she became a founding Executive Editor for ACS Photonics.

== Research interests ==
Research in the Odom group focus on controlling materials at 100 nm scale and investigating their size and shape-dependent properties. Odom group has developed parallel, multi-scale pattering tools to generate hierarchical, anisotropic, and 3D hard and soft materials with applications in imaging, sensing, wetting and cancer therapeutics. As a result of Odom's nanofabrication tools, she has developed flat optics that can manipulate light at the nanoscale and beat the diffraction limit and tunable plasmon-based lasers. Odom also conducts research into nanoparticle-cell interactions using new biological nanoconstructs that offer imaging and therapeutic functions due to their shape (gold nanostar).

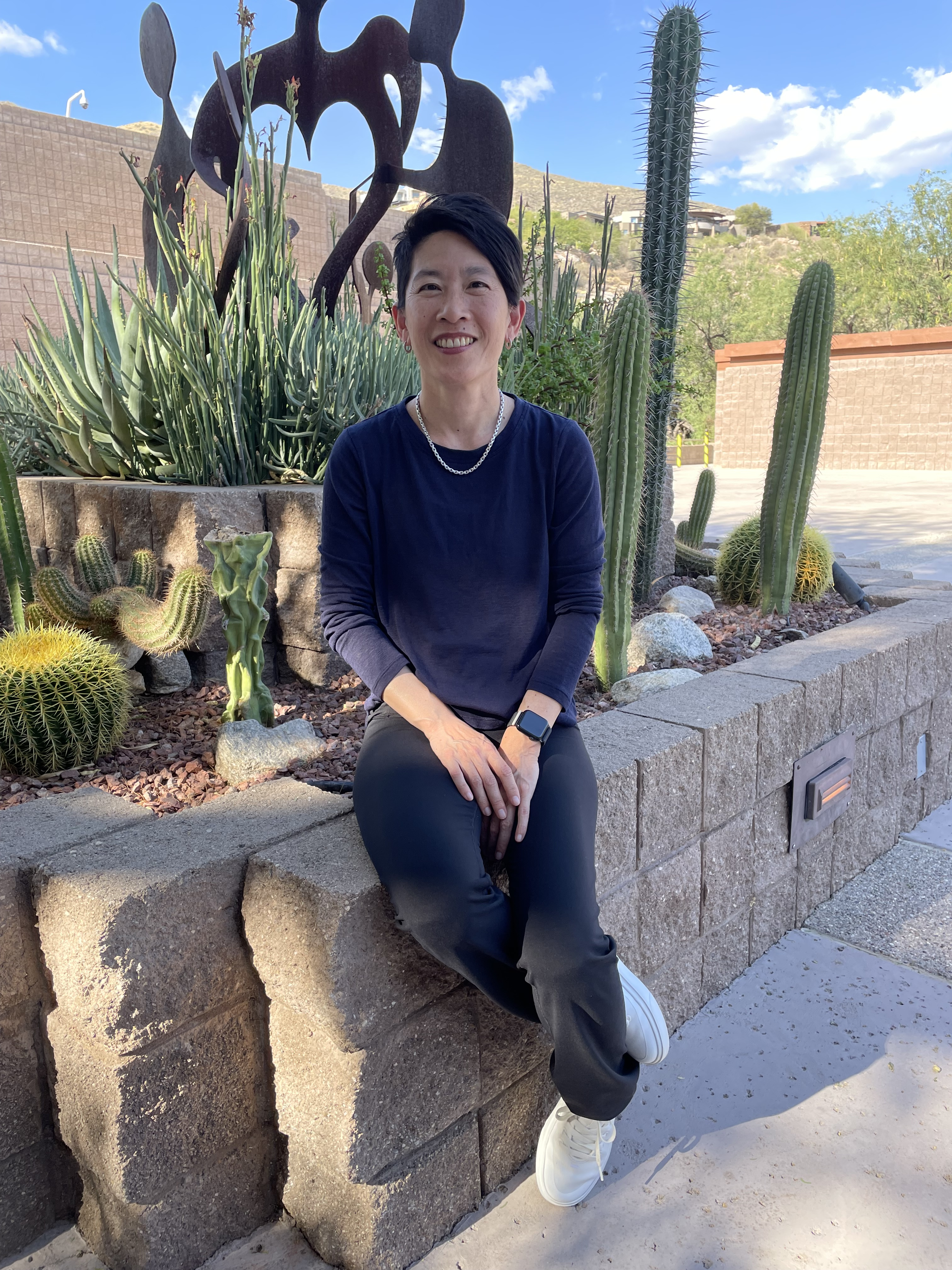
Odom at the 2026 Cottrell Scholars Conference in Tucson

== Personal life ==
Odom's husband Brian, now a physicist and astronomer at Northwestern University, piqued her interest in science by introducing her to the double-slit experiment while they were dating. He encouraged her to pursue undergraduate summer research, an experience that inspired her to continue studying physics and chemistry.

== Awards and recognition ==
- 1996-1999 - National Science Foundation Predoctoral Fellow, Harvard University
- 2001 - International Union of Pure and Applied Chemistry Young Chemists award for thesis
- 2001-2002 - National Research Service Award Postdoctoral Fellow, Harvard University
- 2002 - Research Corporation's Research Innovation Award
- 2002 - Dow Teacher-Scholar Award, inaugural recipient
- 2003 - American Chemical Society's Victor K. LaMer Award
- 2003 - David and Lucile Packard Foundation Fellow
- 2004 - National Science Foundation CAREER Award
- 2004 - MIT Technology Review Top 100 Innovators
- 2005 - Cottrell Scholar Award
- 2005 - DuPont Young Investigator Award
- 2005 - Alfred P. Sloan Research Fellow
- 2006 - ExxonMobil Solid State Chemistry Faculty Fellow
- 2007 - Rohm and Haas New Faculty Award
- 2008 - Phi Lambda Upsilon's National Fresenius Award
- 2008 - National Institutes of Health Director's Pioneer Award
- 2009 - Materials Research Society Outstanding Young Investigator Award
- 2010 - Institute for Defense Analyses's Defense Sciences Study Group (one year)
- 2011 - Radcliffe Institute for Advanced Study Fellow, Harvard University
- 2014 - Royal Society of Chemistry Fellow
- 2014 - Blavatnik Awards for Young Scientists Finalist
- 2014 - International Precious Metals Institute's Carol Tyler Award
- 2016 - Materials Research Society Fellow
- 2016 - Blavatnik Awards for Young Scientists Finalist
- 2017 - ACS Nano Lectureship Award
- 2017 - United States Department of Defense Vannevar Bush Faculty Fellow
- 2018 - American Physical Society Fellow
- 2018 - Research Corporation Cottrell Scholar TREE Award
- 2018 - Optica Senior Member
- 2020 - Royal Society of Chemistry's Centenary Prize
- 2020 - American Academy of Arts and Sciences Fellow
- 2020 - American Chemical Society's Award in Surface Chemistry
- 2022 - American Institute for Medical and Biological Engineering Fellow
- 2022 - American Chemical Society's Crano Memorial Lecture (Akron Section) at Malone University
- 2022 - American Association for the Advancement of Science Fellow
- 2023 - National Academy of Sciences Member - Department of Chemistry
- 2024 - SPIE Mozi Award
