= Miguel Modestino =

Venezuelan-born chemical engineer

Miguel A. Modestino is a Venezuelan-born chemical engineer and co-founder of Sunthetics along with Myriam Sbeiti and Daniela Blanco. Sunthetics uses artificial intelligence to optimize chemical reactions by inducing electrical pulses, from renewable energy, into the reaction instead of just heating them. Modestino is a part of the Joint Center for Artificial Photosynthesis, which is a group focused on reducing the need for fossil fuel by developing solar fuels as a direct alternative. Modestino also formed a group called the Modestino Group, which specialize in developing state of the art electrochemical devices to optimize and tackle the issues revolving renewable energy at New York University (NYU), where he is the Donald F. Othmer Associate Professor of Chemical Engineering and the Director of Sustainable Engineering Initiative.

== Education ==
Miguel Modestino earned his bachelor's degree in chemical engineering in 2007 and his M.S. in chemical engineering in 2008 from Massachusetts Institute of Technology (MIT), and a PH.D. in chemical engineering from University of California, Berkeley in 2013.

During his time at MIT, Modestino was a research assistant from October 2003 to June 2007 under the supervision of Paula Hammond, and worked on film assembly which used a layer-by-layer method for biomedical purposes, while he was working towards his B.S. in chemical engineering. He remained at MIT to complete his M.S. in chemical engineering while simultaneously being a Teaching Assistant for Chemical Engineering Projects Lab from February 2008 to May 2008. In between his M.S. and starting his Ph.D., Modestino was an intern at Novartis and BP in 2008 under David H. Koch School of Chemical Engineering Practice. After he obtained a Ph.D., Modestino did his postdoctoral research at École Polytechnique Fédérale de Lausanne (EPFL) from 2013 to 2016.

== Research and career ==
Modestino is the Donald F. Othmer Associate Professor of Chemical Engineering and the Director of Sustainable Engineering Initiative at New York University. His research focuses on multifunctional materials development and electrochemical engineering for renewable energy and sustainable chemical manufacturing, including the design and optimization of electrochemical devices used in energy conversation technologies.

=== Sunthetics ===
Modestino co-founded Sunthetics, along with NYU graduates Myriam Sbeiti and Daniela Blanco.

Sunthetics is a startup company whose goal is to reduce to reliance on fossil fuels for heating chemical reactions and instead using electrical pulses to supply energy for various chemical reactions to occur. Initially the idea was coined by Blanco as part of her PhD thesis at NYU. The goal was to apply this to nylon, however due to the lack of support from nylon manufacturing companies the idea pivoted to Artificial Intelligence to drive chemical reactions through renewable energy. This led to machine learning optimizing this technology to be applied across several industries.

=== Modestino Group ===
The Modestino Group focuses on the development of electrochemical devices, which are devices used in energy conversion technologies and chemical processes. Through these devices the group can address a wide range of issues such as carbon dioxide reduction, improving grip flexibility characterizing multiphase flow in reactors and developing sustainable clothing. The group has expertise in manufacturing, developing, processing and characterizing composite materials which they use to refine electrochemical reactors in industrial applications. The group has a number of projects under their hood such as solar textiles, materials for electrochemical catalyst layers, advanced electrolysis devices, and multiphase-flow micro-electrochemical reactors. The group consists of Modestino as the leader and head of team, and several Ph.D. students, M.S. students, B.S. students and Alumni.

=== Joint Center for Artificial Photosynthesis ===
While at Berkeley, Modestino participated in a project that harnessed solar energy to convert carbon-dioxide from the air into fuel similar to that of plants this process is call solar fuels as part of his Ph.D. program. At Berkeley, he joined a group called Joint Center for Artificial Photosynthesis (JCAP). JCAP's goal is to research and develop these solar fuels so that it can be used and applied in many facets of the world while also being cost efficient enough to actually challenge or be the better alternative to fossil fuels.

== Awards and recognition ==
In 2015, Modestino won the award for Energy and Environmental Science Reader's Choice Lectureship Award, for his publication of Design and cost considerations for practical solar-hydrogen generators, which was among the most downloaded and read articles of 2014.

In 2017, Modestino won the Global Change Award with Daniela Blanco and Myriam Sbeiti for their work on Sunthetics.

In 2017, Modestino won the MIT Technology Review Innovators Under 35 Award in the region Latin America, for his work in developing and optimizing the chemical industry to become safer for the environment.

In 2018, Modestino was awarded $110,000 in the Doctoral New Investigator Award by the American Chemical Society Petroleum Research Fund, to commemorate his work with Ionic Liquid-Polymer Gel Electrolytes for Electrochemical Olefin Separations.

In 2019, Modestino was awarded National Science Foundation Career Award.

In 2020, Modestino was included in MIT Technology Review magazine's "Innovators Under 35" list, for his team's innovation of using artificial intelligence to make chemical reactions more efficient using electrical pulses instead of heating while simultaneously having it adapt to different chemicals.

In 2020, Modestino was awarded the Goddard Junior Faculty Fellowship Award in New York University. Modestino earned the reward as a tenure-tract faculty member who has successfully pass their three-year review, the reward is either one course deduction to focus on research or scholarships or $5,000 towards their scholarship.

In 2021, Modestino was awarded the TED Idea Search Latin America.
