= Nathan Lewis (chemist) =

American chemist

Nathan S. Lewis
- Education: California Institute of Technology (BS, MS); Massachusetts Institute of Technology (PhD)
- Scientific career
- Fields: Chemistry
- Workplaces: Stanford University; California Institute of Technology
- Thesis: Manipulation and measurement of charge transfer kinetics at chemically modified electrodes (1981)
- Doctoral advisor: Mark S. Wrighton
- Other academic advisors: Harry B. Gray
- Doctoral students: Julie S. Biteen; Charles M. Lieber; SonBinh Nguyen; Emily Warren
- Other notable students: Post-Docs: Shannon W. Boettcher; Adam J. Matzger; Michael J. Sailor
- Website: nsl.caltech.edu/nslewis

Nathan S. Lewis is the George L. Argyros Professor of Chemistry at the California Institute of Technology (Caltech). He specializes in functionalization of silicon and other semiconductor surfaces, chemical sensing using chemiresistive sensor arrays, and alternative energy and artificial photosynthesis.

== Early life and education ==
Lewis obtained his B.S. and M.S. degrees at Caltech under Harry B. Gray in 1977 studying the redox reactions of inorganic rhodium complexes. After that, he moved to the Massachusetts Institute of Technology for his Ph.D. in 1981 under Mark S. Wrighton studying semiconductor electrochemistry.

== Career ==
=== Early career ===
Lewis worked at Stanford as an assistant professor from 1981 to 1985 and then as a tenured Associate Professor from 1986 to 1988, before returning to Caltech in 1988.

=== Cold Fusion and the 'Caltech Three' ===
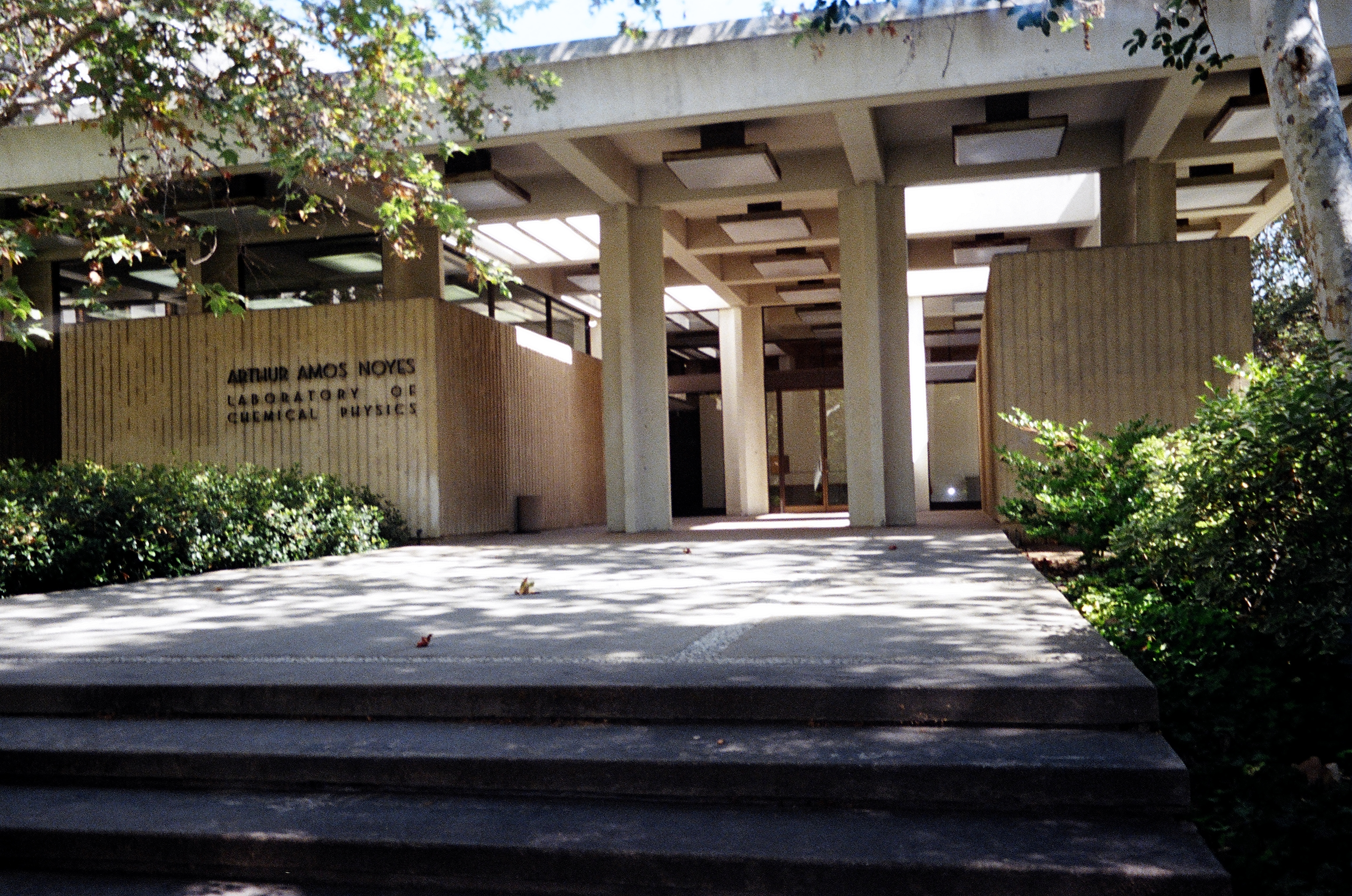
The Noyes Chemistry Laboratory at Caltech where Nathan Lewis and his group worked on cold fusion

In March of 1989, Stanley Pons and Martin Fleischmann announced their purported discovery of controlled cold fusion at a press conference. At Caltech, Lewis and his colleague, the physicist Charles Barnes, headed up a 17-member team that attempted to replicated the Pons-Fleishmann experiment. After investigation, Lewis and Barnes' cold fusion research group came to the conclusion that the Pons-Fleischmann electrochemical cells did not produce excess heat. The two scientists along with their colleague Steven E. Koonin became known as the "Caltech Three" after they began to publish and present the results of their research and refute the claims of Pons and Fleischmann

At the meeting of the American Physical Society in Baltimore in May of 1989 Lewis presented the findings of the Caltech group during a marathon session on cold fusion that ended up running for two nights. A week later a special session of the Electrochemical Society, Lewis appeared as one of ten speakers on a panel that included Pons and Fleischmann. He was the only speaker on the panel critical of their cold fusion research. In August of 1989, Lewis, Barnes, and their collaborators' research was published as a paper in Nature titled, "Searches for low-temperature nuclear fusion of deuterium in palladium". The research of the Caltech group revealed serious deficiencies in cold fusion research and ultimately led to mainstream science's rejection of cold fusion.

=== Research since the 1980s ===
External videos
- “Powering the Planet: Where in the World Will Our Energy Come From?”, Nate Lewis, 2005, Caltech
- “Big Think Interview With Nate Lewis ”, Nate Lewis, 2012
- “Breaking the Wall of the Global Energy Challenge”, Nate Lewis, 2014

Lewis became a full professor at Caltech in 1991. In 1992, he became the Principal Investigator of the Molecular Materials Resource Center at the Beckman Institute at Caltech.

His research interests include surface chemistry, particularly silicon surfaces and their photoelectrochemical performance. The study of electron transfer reactions, both at surfaces and in transition metal complexes, in response to light, has relevance for the creation of semiconductors and for artificial photosynthesis. A major focus of his research is solar energy. He is working on the development of components for a photoanode, photocathode, and ion-conducting membrane for a system for artificial photosynthesis that would use sunlight and water to produce hydrogen and oxygen. He is also engaged in "big-picture" thinking about the science and policy issues affecting solar conversion.

In addition, Lewis is involved in the creation and use of novel organic polymers and the creation of sensor arrays and pattern recognition algorithms for an "electronic nose" that can be used for detection of explosives and diagnosis of illness. The American Ceramic Society awarded him the 2003 Edward Orton, Jr. Memorial Lecture award for "An ‘Electronic Nose’ Based on Arrays of Conducting Polymer Composite Vapor Detectors".

In July, 2010 Lewis was named as director of a U.S. Department of Energy Energy Innovation Hub, the Joint Center for Artificial Photosynthesis, to develop revolutionary methods to generate fuels directly from sunlight. He has been appointed chair of the Editorial Board for Energy and Environmental Science. He was #17 in the 2009 Rolling Stone list of Agents of Change.

== Awards ==
- 1977, Hertz Fellowship
- 1985, Sloan Research Fellowship
- 1985, Camille Dreyfus Teacher-Scholar Awards
- 1988, Presidential Young Investigator Award
- 1990, Fresenius Award
- 1991, ACS Award in Pure Chemistry
- 2003, Edward Orton, Jr. Memorial Lecture award
- 2003, Princeton Environmental Award
- 2008, Michael Faraday Medal of the Royal Society of Electrochemistry
- 2017, National Academy of Inventors Fellow
