= JCAP =

JCAP may refer to:

- Joint Center for Artificial Photosynthesis, a DOE Energy Innovation Hub
- Journal of Cosmology and Astroparticle Physics, a peer reviewed scientific journal
