= Emily Warren (scientist) =

American physicist

Emily Lowell Warren
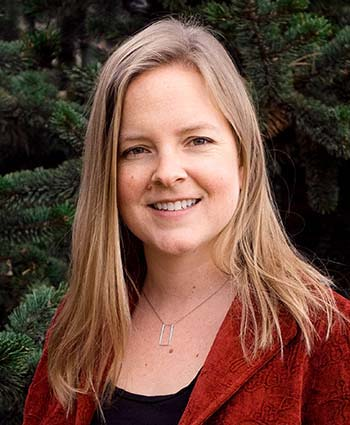
- Education: California Institute of Technology; Cornell University; University of Cambridge
- Scientific career
- Workplaces: National Renewable Energy Laboratory
- Thesis: Silicon Microwire Arrays for Photoelectrochemical and Photovoltaic Applications (2013)
- Doctoral advisors: Nathan Lewis; Harry Atwater

Emily Warren is an American chemical engineer who is a staff scientist at the National Renewable Energy Laboratory. Her research considers high efficiency crystalline photovoltaics.

== Early life and education ==
Warren became interested in science as a child. At elementary school, she campaigned to save the rainforest. Warren was an undergraduate student at Cornell University, where she studied chemical engineering and became aware of the energy industry. She travelled to Nigeria for a course on sustainable development. She was a graduate student at California Institute of Technology. Her research considered the growth of silicon microwire arrays using vapor–liquid–solid methods. These strategies could be used to produce high aspect ratio structures that are efficient in photovoltaics and have a high surface area for use in catalysis and as electrodes in water splitting. After earning her doctorate, she briefly considered working in industry, but instead joined the Colorado School of Mines to work on solar thermoelectric generator projects.

== Research and career ==
Warren joined the National Renewable Energy Laboratory in 2014, where she started working on electrochemical measurements of semiconductor materials. Her research considers heteroepitaxy of III-V semiconductors. In particular, she is interested in how the nanostructure impacts coalescence and performance.

Warren has worked on tandem solar cells, multi-layer devices that combine various photovoltaic materials of narrow and wide band gaps to form efficient multi-junction devices. Silicon is used as the bottom cell for many tandem solar cells owing to its high efficiency and well-established fabrication protocols. Warren used computational modelling to demonstrate that a three-terminal device, consisting of a top cell in series with an interdigitated back contact silicon cell with a conductive top contact, was more efficient than a two- or four-terminal device. She showed that it was possible to make highly efficient, highly stable all perovskite tandem solar cells.

== Selected publications ==
- Michael G Walter; Emily L Warren; James R McKone; Shannon W Boettcher; Qixi Mi; Elizabeth A Santori; Nathan S Lewis (November 1, 2010). "Solar water splitting cells". Chemical Reviews. 110 (11): 6446–6473. doi:10.1021/cr1002326. ISSN 0009-2665. PMID 21062097. Wikidata Q46232196.
- Shannon W. Boettcher; Emily L Warren; Morgan C Putnam; et al. (January 7, 2011). "Photoelectrochemical hydrogen evolution using Si microwire arrays". Journal of the American Chemical Society. 133 (5): 1216–1219. doi:10.1021/ja108801m. ISSN 0002-7863. PMID 21214239. Wikidata Q46460891.
- Emily L. Warren; James R. McKone; Harry A. Atwater; Harry B. Gray; Nathan S. Lewis (2012). "Hydrogen-evolution characteristics of Ni–Mo-coated, radial junction, n+p-silicon microwire array photocathodes". Energy & Environmental Science. 5 (11): 9653. doi:10.1039/c2ee23192a. ISSN 1754-5692. Wikidata Q59947162.
