= Elizabeth R. Gillies =

Canadian polymer scientist

Elizabeth Rachel Gillies is a Canadian polymer scientist known for her development of smart polymers whose degradation can be triggered by environmental changes, and their applications in drug delivery, agriculture, additive manufacturing, and as alternatives to the conventional uses of polymers such as packaging. She is a professor in the Department of Chemistry and Chemical and Biochemical Engineering at the University of Western Ontario (Western University), where she holds a tier 1 Canada Research Chair in Polymeric Biomaterials.

== Education and career ==
Gillies was an undergraduate student of chemistry at Queen's University at Kingston, graduating with honours in 2000. She completed a Ph.D. in 2004 at the University of California, Berkeley. Her dissertation, Macromolecules for drug delivery: New dendritic architectures and pH sensitive supramolecular assemblies, was supervised by Jean Fréchet.

She became a postdoctoral researcher at the European Institute of Chemistry and Biology from 2004 to 2006, supported as a Marie-Curie Postdoctoral Fellow. She joined Western University in 2006 as an assistant professor, joint between the Department of Chemistry and the Department of Chemical and Biochemical Engineering. After holding a tier 2 Canada Research Chair from 2006 to 2016, and a promotion to full professor in 2017, she was given her tier 1 Canada Research Chair in Polymeric Biomaterials in 2020.

== Recognition ==
Gillies was the 2006 recipient of the John Charles Polanyi Prize in Chemistry of the government of Ontario. NSERC gave Gillies their E.W.R. Steacie Memorial Fellowship in 2017. In 2018, she was named to the College of New Scholars, Artists and Scientists of the Royal Society of Canada. She was elected to the Canadian Academy of Engineering in 2023.
