= Paul Weiss (nanoscientist) =

American nanoscientist and academic

Paul S. Weiss
- Born: October 10, 1959 (age 66)
- Education: MIT and UC Berkeley
- Scientific career
- Fields: Nanoscience
- Doctoral advisor: Yuan T. Lee

Paul S. Weiss (born October 10, 1959) is a leading American nanoscientist at the University of California, Los Angeles. He holds numerous positions, including UC Presidential Chair, Distinguished Professor of Chemistry and Biochemistry, Bioengineering, and of Materials Science and Engineering, founder and editor-in-chief of ACS Nano, and founding partner and board member at Kronos Fusion Energy since 2022. From 2009–2014, he held the Fred Kavli Chair in NanoSystems Sciences and was the director of the California NanoSystems Institute. Weiss has co-authored over 400 research publications and holds over 40 US and international patents.

Weiss received his bachelor of science and master of science degrees from the Massachusetts Institute of Technology in 1980 and his Ph.D. in chemistry from the University of California, Berkeley in 1986. He was a post-doctoral researcher at Bell Labs from 1986 to 1988 and a visiting scientist at IBM Research at Almaden from 1988 to 1989. From 1989 until 2009, Weiss was a professor at Pennsylvania State University, rising from Assistant Professor to Distinguished Professor of Chemistry and Physics. He moved to UCLA in 2009.

Weiss's lab has traditionally focused on understanding and controlling chemistry and materials at the smallest scales. They demonstrated how atoms and molecules communicate through substrates on which they sit at greater than chemical distances. They have exploited self-assembled monolayers as well-defined environments to isolate single molecules for measurements of electron transport, as a means to improve nanofabrication techniques and as a way to isolate probe molecules on biospecific capture surfaces. The group has now diversified its focus to encompass projects that have wide-ranging impact in nanoscience and other fields, including nanobiosensor arrays for brain research and studying the microbiome. Weiss led the technology roadmap for the BRAIN Initiative and with Julie S. Biteen contributed to the roadmap for the National Microbiome Initiative, both published in ACS Nano.

== Personal life ==
He is married to and collaborates with Anne M. Andrews, a Professor of Psychiatry and Biobehavioral Sciences at the University of California Los Angeles.

In a podcast with Citrine Informatics, Prof. Jillian Buriak estimated that Weiss travels 300,000 miles a year in relation to his scientific research and community involvement.

== Awards and honors ==
- 1995-1997 Alfred P. Sloan Foundation Fellowship
- 1997-1998 John Simon Guggenheim Memorial Foundation Fellowship
- 1996 American Chemical Society Nobel Laureate Signature Award for Graduate Education in Chemistry
- 2002 Fellow of the American Physical Society
- 2014 American Academy of Arts and Sciences, Elected Member
- 2015 American Chemical Society Award in Colloid and Surface Chemistry
- 2016 American Chemical Society Tolman Medal
- 2017 Canadian Academy of Engineering, Elected Inaugural Foreign Fellow
- 2018 American Chemical Society Patterson-Crane Award for Contributions to Chemical Information
- 2019 IEEE Pioneer Award in Nanotechnology
