= Jean Fréchet =

French-American chemist

Jean M.J. Fréchet
- Born: August 19, 1944 (age 82); Burgundy, France
- Known for: Dendrimers; Contributions in the fields of polymer science, photolithography, molecular self-assembly, microfluidics, and nanotechnology.
- Awards: Dickson Prize (2007), Arthur C. Cope Award (2007), Japan Prize (2013), King Faisal International Prize (2019)
- Scientific career
- Fields: Chemistry
- Workplaces: King Abdullah University of Science and Technology; University of California, Berkeley; Lawrence Berkeley National Laboratory; Cornell University; University of Ottawa
- Thesis: Solid Phase Synthesis of Oligosaccharides (1972)
- Doctoral students: Shelley Claridge; Elizabeth R. Gillies; Karen L. Wooley
- Other notable students: Craig Hawker
- Website: chemistry.berkeley.edu/faculty/chem/emeriti/frechet, www.kaust.edu.sa/office-vp-research-jean-frechet.html

Jean M.J. Fréchet (born August 1944) is a French-American chemist and professor emeritus at the University of California, Berkeley. He is best known for his work on polymers including polymer-supported chemistry, chemically amplified photoresists, dendrimers, macroporous separation media, and polymers for therapeutics. He has authored nearly 900 scientific paper and 200 patents including 96 US patents. His research areas include organic synthesis and polymer chemistry applied to nanoscience and nanotechnology with emphasis on the design, fundamental understanding, synthesis, and applications of functional macromolecules.

Fréchet is an elected fellow of the American Association for the Advancement of Science, the American Chemical Society, and the American Academy of Arts and Sciences, and an elected member of the US National Academy of Sciences, the US National Academy of Engineering, and the Academy of Europe (Academia Europaea).

== Education and academic career ==
Fréchet received his first university degree at the Institut de Chimie et Physique Industrielles (now CPE) in Lyon, France, before coming to the US for studies in organic and polymer chemistry under Conrad Schuerch at the State University of New York College of Environmental Science and Forestry, and at Syracuse University (Ph.D. 1971). He was on the Chemistry Faculty at the University of Ottawa in Canada from 1973 to 1987, when he became the IBM Professor of Polymer Chemistry at Cornell University. In 1997 Fréchet joined Chemistry faculty at the University of California, Berkeley and was named the Henry Rapoport Chair of Organic Chemistry in 2003 and Professor of Chemical and Biological Engineering in 2005. From 2010 to 2019 he served as the first Vice President for Research, then Senior Vice-President for Research, Innovation, and Economic Development at the King Abdullah University of Science and Technology.

== Research ==
Fréchet’s early work focused on polymer-supported chemistry with the first approach to the solid-phase synthesis of oligosaccharides and pioneering work on polymeric reagents and polymer protecting groups. In 1979 Working with C.G. Willson at IBM during a sabbatical leave, he invented chemically amplified photoresists for micro and nanofabrication. This widely used patented technology which enables the extreme miniaturization of microelectronic devices is now ubiquitous for the fabrication of the very powerful computing and communication equipment in worldwide use. The addition of photogenerated bases led to additional advances in chemically amplified resists. In 1990 working with Craig Hawker at Cornell, he developed the convergent synthesis of dendrimers as well as approaches to hyperbranched polymers. In 1992, working with F. Svec at Cornell, he reported the first preparation of macroporous polymer monoliths that are now used in a variety of chemical separations. Later work at Berkeley saw the development of polymers and dendrimers as carriers for targeted therapeutics and successful approaches to new organic materials for transistors and solar cells.

== Honors and awards ==
- 2020 National Academy of Engineering Charles Stark Draper Prize in Engineering
- 2019 King Faisal International Prize in Chemistry
- 2013 Japan Prize for the "Development of chemically amplified resist polymer materials for innovative semiconductor manufacturing process"
- 2010 Grand Prix de la Maison de la Chimie (Paris)
- 2010 Erasmus Medal of the Academia Europaea
- 2010 Society of Polymer Science of Japan, International Award for the "Development of functional polymers from fundamentals to application"
- 2010 University of California Department of Chemistry Teaching Award
- 2010 Fellow of the American Chemical Society
- 2009 Elected to the Academy of Europe (Academia Europaea)
- 2009 Nagoya Gold Medal
- 2009 Arun Guthikonda Memorial Award, Columbia University.
- 2009 Society of Polymer Science of Japan, International Award for the "Development of functional polymers from fundamentals to applications".
- 2009 Carothers Award for "Outstanding contributions and advances in industrial applications of chemistry".
- 2009 Herman Mark Award, American Chemical Society.
- 2008 D.Sc. (Honoris Causa), University of Liverpool, UK
- 2007 Dickson Prize in Science, Carnegie Mellon University
- 2007 Arthur C. Cope Award (American Chemical Society award for outstanding achievement in the field of Organic Chemistry)
- 2006 Macro Group UK Medal (joint Royal Society for Chemistry and Society of Chemical Industry) for Outstanding Achievement in the field of Macromolecular Chemistry
- 2005 Esselen Award for Chemistry in the Service of the Public
- 2005 Chemical Communications 40th Anniversary Award
- 2004 Docteur de L'Université, Université d'Ottawa, Canada
- 2003 Henry Rapoport Chair of Organic Chemistry, University of California, Berkeley
- 2002 Docteur (Honoris Causa), Université de Lyon I, France
- 2001 American Chemical Society, Salute to Excellence Award
- 2001 American Chemical Society, A.C. Cope Scholar Award
- 2000 Elected Fellow of the American Academy of Arts and Sciences
- 2000 Elected Member of the US National Academy of Engineering
- 2000 Elected Fellow of the PMSE Division of the American Chemical Society
- 2000 Elected Fellow of the American Association for the Advancement of Science
- 2000 Elected Member of the US National Academy of Sciences
- 2000 American Chemical Society, ACS Award in Polymer Chemistry
- 2000 Myron L. Bender & Muriel S. Bender Distinguished Summer Lectureship
- 1999 Society of Imaging Science and Technology, Kosar Memorial Award
- 1996 American Chemical Society, ACS Award in Applied Polymer Science
- 1995 Peter J. Debye Chair of Chemistry, Cornell University, NY
- 1994 American Chemical Society, Cooperative Research Award in Polymer Science
- 1987 IBM Professor of Polymer Chemistry
- 1986 American Chemical Society, Doolittle Award in Polymer Materials Science & Engineering
- 1986 Polymer Society of Japan Lecture Award
- 1983 IUPAC Canadian National Committee Award
