= Shannon W. Boettcher =

American chemist and educator (born 1973)

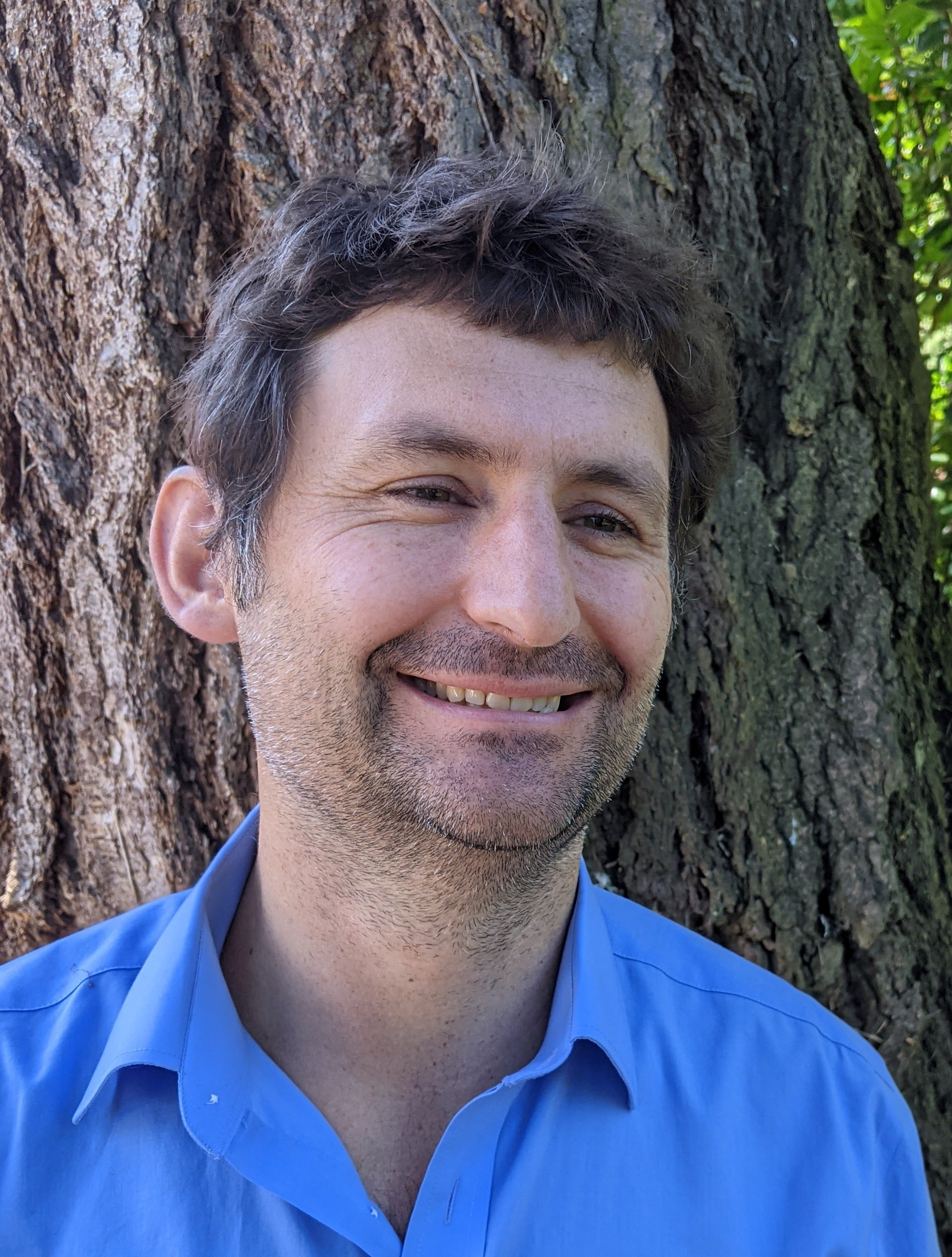
- Boettcher (2021)
- Born: 1981 (age 44–45)
- Education: California Institute of Technology (postdoctoral work); University of California, Santa Barbara (2008, PhD); University of Oregon (2003, B.A)
- Scientific career
- Thesis: Synthesis, characterization, and electronic tuning of nanostructured materials (2008)
- Doctoral advisor: Galen D. Stucky
- Website: chemistry.berkeley.edu/people/shannon-boettcher

Shannon W. Boettcher (born 1981) is an American chemist and chemical engineer, and professor. He is the Theodore Vermeulen Professor in the Departments of Chemical and Biomolecular Engineering and Chemistry at UC Berkeley and was previously in the Department of Chemistry and Biochemistry at the University of Oregon. His research is at the intersection of materials science and electrochemistry, with a focus on fundamental aspects of energy conversion and storage. He has been named a DuPont Young Professor, a Cottrell Scholar, a Sloan Fellow, and a Camille Dreyfus Teacher-Scholar. An ISI highly cited researcher (top 0.1% over past decade), in 2019, he founded the Oregon Center for Electrochemistry and, in 2020, launched the nation's first targeted graduate program in electrochemical technology. In 2021, he was named a Blavatnik National Award Finalist and in 2023 the Blavatnik National Award Laureate.

== Academic career ==
Boettcher earned his B.A. from the University of Oregon in 2003. He performed his undergraduate work performing research with Prof. Mark Lonergan on electronically conductive ionomers and conjugated-polymer/semiconductor interfaces. His PhD work (2003–2008) in inorganic materials chemistry was at the University of California, Santa Barbara with Prof. Galen Stucky where he was a National Science Foundation Graduate Research Fellow and a UC Chancellors Fellow. His work spanned the synthesis and study of porous transition metal oxides, photoelectrochemistry, and detailed studies of nanoparticle film electrochemistry and nanoparticle/semiconductor interfaces.

He completed postdoctoral work at the California Institute of Technology as a Kavli Nanoscience Institute Prize Postdoctoral Fellow working with Prof. Nathan Lewis (Chemistry) and Prof. Harry Atwater (Applied Physics) studying three-dimensional semiconductor architectures for solar photoelectrochemical and photovoltaic applications. He started as an assistant professor at the University of Oregon in 2010. In the spring of 2012, a profile appeared on Boettcher's work, his background, and perspective in The Oregon Quarterly.
