= Tina Nenoff =

American materials scientist and chemical engineer

Tina M. Nenoff (born 1965) is an American materials scientist and chemical engineer who works as a senior scientist and Sandia Fellow at Sandia National Laboratories, on leave from Sandia for a two-year term as deputy and science advisor to Jill Hruby, the Under Secretary of Energy for Nuclear Security. Her research concerns nanoporous materials such as zeolites and metal–organic frameworks, and their applications including reverse osmosis, water splitting for the hydrogen economy, and the detection and sequestration of radioactive iodine produced as nuclear waste. She also developed use of crystalline silicotitanates (discovered by Anthony and Dosch) to remove radioactive cesium from contaminated seawater after the Fukushima nuclear accident.

== Education and career ==
Nenoff was born on December 7, 1965, in Orange, New Jersey, the daughter of a biologist and a physician. After attending an all-girls high school, she majored in chemistry at the University of Pennsylvania, graduating in 1987. Originally intending to go into medicine, she shifted direction under the mentorship of Alan MacDiarmid. Instead, after a year and half working at Ciba-Geigy, she returned to graduate study. She earned a PhD in chemistry from the University of California, Santa Barbara in 1993, supervised by Galen D. Stucky, and has worked at Sandia since then.

== Recognition ==
Nenoff was elected as a Fellow of the American Chemical Society in 2011 and as a Fellow of the American Association for the Advancement of Science in 2019. The Society of Women Engineers gave her an achievement award in 2022 "for groundbreaking research in nanoporous materials; and for instilling in others the ethics and integrity for guiding future discoveries in chemistry and chemical engineering". She was elected to the National Academy of Engineering in 2024, "for translating fundamental understanding of nanoporous materials into applications with societal and national security impact".
