= Daniela Blanco =

Venezuelan chemical engineer and entrepreneur

Daniela Blanco is a Venezuelan-born chemical engineer. She is co-founder and CEO of Sunthetics, a sustainable materials startup company seeking to move the chemical industry away from its reliance on fossil fuels, such as gas and oil. Sunthetics focuses on electrochemical processes and utilizes its own proprietary Artificial Intelligence software to increase the efficiency of reactions that are powered using electricity. These chemical reactions are driven by "complex pulses of electrical current" using renewable energy as opposed to the traditional method requiring heat, which is dependent on the use of fossil fuels. Beyond the sustainability of Sunthetics, Blanco emphasizes the profitability of the company. In 2020, Blanco was named a Top Innovator under 35 in Latin America by MIT Technology Review.

== Early life and education ==
Blanco attended the highest ranked science secondary school in Venezuela, which opened doors to opportunities like attending the International Chemistry Olympiads. She initially wanted to study medicine after high school and become a neurosurgeon. However, she decided against this path after witnessing a surgery during a vocational internship and having a negative reaction to the sight of blood. She chose to pursue chemical engineering after shadowing a chemical engineer at a Venezuelan chemical company.

Blanco earned her bachelor's degree in chemical engineering from Universidad Simón Bolívar in Venezuela.

She moved to the United States in 2017 to attend New York University. Blanco has discussed initially feeling "so behind and so out of place" at NYU because, due to a lack of funding, the university she previously attended in Venezuela didn't have the up-to-date laboratory equipment and technology that the NYU research labs had.

Blanco earned her PhD in chemical engineering from New York University in 2020.

== Career and contributions ==
Blanco has received numerous prizes throughout her career so far, including the following: the $100,000 Technology Venture Prize at the NYU Stern $300K Entrepreneurship Challenge, the $20,000 top prize in the InnoVention Competition at Tandon, a $20,000 Stage II VentureWell grant, the title of 2019 Global Student Entrepreneur of the Year, and the Lemelson-MIT Student Prize in 2020.

Blanco was featured in the 2021 documentary Own the Room co-directed by Cristina Costantini and Darren Foster. The film follows five student entrepreneurs competing in the 2019 Global Student Entrepreneur Awards with the finals taking place in Macau, China. Blanco, representing the United States, won the title of Global Champion with its accompanying $100,000 grand prize.

Blanco has contributed to research papers, including these:

Number	Title	Number of citations	Year published
1	Controlling Selectivity in the Electrochemical Reduction of Acrylonitrile: Towards a Solar-Driven Nylon 6, 6 Production Process		2018
2	Trends Chem. 2019, 1, 8–10; g) A. Wiebe, T. Gieshoff, S. Möhle, E. Rodrigo, M. Zirbes, SR Waldvogel	5	2018
3	Optimizing organic electrosynthesis through controlled voltage dosing and artificial intelligence	91	2019
4	Organic electrosynthesis for sustainable chemical manufacturing DE Blanco, MA Mo	61	2019
5	Enhancing selectivity and efficiency in the electrochemical synthesis of adiponitrile	42	2019
6	Enhancing Organic Electrosynthesis through Artificial Intelligence: The Case of Adiponitrile Electrohydrodimerization		2019
7	Design Guidelines for Membrane-separated Organic Electrosynthesis: The Case of Adiponitrile Production		2019
8	Process Intensification Approaches to Organic Electrosynthesis: Towards Sustainable Nylon Production		2019
9	Enhancing Organic Electrosynthesis through Artificial Intelligence: The Case of Adiponitrile Electrohydrodimerization		2019
10	Design considerations of sunlight-driven organic electrosynthetic processes		2019
11	Insights into membrane-separated organic electrosynthesis: the case of adiponitrile electrochemical production	22	2020
12	Controlling selectivity in the electrocatalytic hydrogenation of adiponitrile through electrolyte design	15	2020
13	Effect of electrolyte cations on organic electrosynthesis: The case of adiponitrile electrochemical production	14	2020
14	Enhancing Selectivity and Energy Conversion Efficiency in Organic Electrosynthesis		2020
15	Spearheading the Electrification of Chemical Manufacturing with Smart Organic Electrosynthesis		2021
16	Enhancing Performance of Organic Electrosynthesis through Electrolyte Engineering and Mass Transport Control		2021
17	Electrohydrogenation of nitriles		2022
18	Systems and methods for integrated solar photodialysis	4	2023

=== Sunthetics ===
Blanco co-founded Sunthetics, along with fellow NYU graduate, Myriam Sbeiti, and NYU professor of Chemical and Biomolecular Engineering, Miguel Modestino.

The idea for Sunthetics was born while Blanco was a PhD student at NYU working on her PhD thesis. Her goal was to find a way to efficiently power chemical reactions using electricity rather than heat which relies on the burning of fossil fuels. She was initially focused on applying this idea to part of the development process for the widely used material, nylon. When faced with a lack of interest from Nylon manufacturing companies, the Sunthetic's co-founders decided to pivot their companies focus to the Artificial Intelligence (AI) algorithms behind the process. The AI tools that had been developed were the key to making the renewable energy driven chemical reactions as efficient as possible. Blanco also found there was significantly more interest in the AI technology she and the Sunthetics team had developed and it was this technology that could be applied to many different industries. Sunthetics now focuses on further developing and perfecting that AI-driven machine learning platform. As of 2022, Sunthetics has six employees. In November 2024, Sunthetics raised $4 million from investors to help grow their team and improve their artificial intelligence technology that speeds up how new chemicals and medicines are made.

== Recognition ==
- 2022, Rising Star in Sustainability
- 2021, Forbes 30 Under 30 on its Energy list
- 2020, MIT Technology Review award for Top Innovator under 35 in Latin America
- 2020, Top Female Founder by Inc Magazine
- 2020, Top Graduate Inventor by Lemelson-MIT
- 2019, Global Champion at Global Student Entrepreneur Awards
- 2019, named Brightest AI-CI Mind by the MIT Center for Collective Intelligence
- 2019 United States Student Entrepreneur of the Year
- 2018, New York Student Entrepreneur of the Year

== Personal life ==
Blanco was raised in Venezuela by her mother, Maria Eugenia Blanco. Blanco recounts that being raised by a single-mom made her believe that "women can do anything".

She credits her resiliency and motivation, in part, to her Venezuelan upbringing stating: "...Venezuelans are always incredibly optimistic. They focus on what is going right. They laugh at the things that are not going so well."

Blanco credits a science experiment she witnessed during her preschool class as being the source of her initial inspiration to become a scientist.

She currently lives in Temple, Texas.
