= Kyoung-Shin Choi =

Korean American chemist

- Education: Seoul National University B.S. (1993) M.S. (1995); Michigan State University Ph.D. (2000)
- Awards: Electrochemistry, Materials chemistry, Inorganic chemistry, Nanoscience
- Scientific career
- Fields: Alfred P. Sloan Research Fellowship
- Workplaces: University of Wisconsin-Madison (2012-present); Purdue University (2002-2012); University of California, Santa Barbara (2000-2002)
- Thesis: Studies on the multinary antimony chalocogenides and related compounds prepared by the molten salt method (2000)
- Doctoral advisor: Mercouri G. Kanatzidis
- Other academic advisors: Jin-Ho Choy, Galen D. Stucky, Eric W. McFarland
- Website: choi.chem.wisc.edu

- Kyoung-Shin Choi
- Hangul: 최경신
- RR: Choe Gyeongsin
- MR: Ch'oe Kyŏngsin

Kyoung-Shin Choi (Korean: 최경신) is a professor of chemistry at the University of Wisconsin-Madison. Choi's research focuses on the electrochemical synthesis of electrode materials, for use in electrochemical and photoelectrochemical devices.

== Early life and education ==
Choi studied piano at Yewon Middle School, Korea's first middle school dedicated to the arts. In high school, Choi liked Chemistry and Physics classes tremendously and decided to become a scientist. Choi attended college at Seoul National University in South Korea, earning her B.S. (major in Food and Nutrition and minor in Chemistry) in 1993 and M.S. in 1995. She worked with Jin-Ho Choy on the crystal structure, pressure-induced phase transitions, and magnetism of chromium-niobium oxide materials that adopt the double perovskite structure.

For her doctoral study, Choi came to the United States in 1995. She worked at Michigan State University in the laboratory of Mercouri G. Kanatzidis, earning her Ph.D. in chemistry in 2000. Her graduate work focused on the synthesis of various solid state antimony and bismuth-containing chalcogenides using the "molten polychalcogenide salt method."

Choi then conducted postdoctoral studies from 2000 to 2002 at the University of California, Santa Barbara with Galen D. Stucky and Eric W. McFarland. Her postdoctoral research concerned the electrochemical synthesis of nanostructured thin films.

== Independent career ==
Choi began her independent career at Purdue University as an assistant professor in 2002, and was later promoted to associate professor. She was a visiting scholar at the National Renewable Energy Laboratory in 2008. In 2012, she moved to University of Wisconsin-Madison as a full professor of chemistry.

Choi has served as an associate editor of the journal Chemistry of Materials since 2014.

== Research ==
The Choi research group studies electrodes and catalysts for use in photoelectrochemical and electrochemical applications. Earlier work in the group has included the crystallization of cuprous oxide in various morphologies, in which the authors utilized electrochemistry to control the crystallization process and resultant crystal morphologies.

The Choi group has extensively studied bismuth vanadate, a photoanode for light-driven water splitting. This material suffers from facile bulk electron-hole recombination, but by combining the bismuth vanadate catalyst with oxygen-evolution catalysts such as FeOOH and NiOOH, Choi and coworkers were able to minimize this deleterious process and achieve higher catalytic efficiencies. The Choi group has also studied the stability of the bismuth vanadate catalyst, as well as the effects of surface composition on the interfacial energetics of photoelectrochemical catalysis.

In one report, Choi and coworkers developed a photoelectrochemical cell (PEC), a device that can split water into hydrogen and oxygen given inputs of light and electricity. PECs are promising devices for hydrogen production, for use in a hydrogen economy. However, the anodic reaction, the oxygen evolution reaction (OER), is slow and limits the overall process. To sidestep this problem, Choi and coworkers paired the hydrogen evolution reaction (HER) with oxidation of 5-hydroxymethylfurfural (HMF) to 2,5-furandicarboxylic acid (FDCA). This allows them to generate FDCA, a valuable commodity chemical used in plastic production, from HMF, which can be derived from cellulose.

== Awards ==
- 2006 Alfred P. Sloan Research Fellowship, Alfred P. Sloan Foundation
- 2006 ACS PROGRESS/Dreyfus Lectureship award, American Chemical Society
- 2007 ACS-ExxonMobil Solid State Chemistry Faculty Fellowship
- 2008 Purdue College of Science Outstanding Undergraduate Teaching Award by an Assistant Professor
- 2010 Iota Sigma Pi Agnes Fay Morgan Research Award
- 2011 University Faculty Scholar, Purdue University
- 2011 Volume Organizer of Materials Research Society Bulletin
- 2011 Chair, ACS-Division of Inorganic Chemistry, Solid State Subdivision
- 2013 Kavli Frontiers of Science Fellow (National Academy of Sciences)
- 2014 Chair, Gordon Research Conference-Electrodeposition
- 2014 Speaker for the Stanford Distinguished Women in Science Colloquia Series
- 2014 University Housing Honored Instructor
- 2015 Camille and Henry Dreyfus Environmental Chemistry Mentor
- 2015 Wisconsin Alumni Research Foundation (WARF) Innovation Award
- 2016 UW-Madison Villas Associate Award
- 2017 MIT Student-Invited Inorganic Seminar Speaker
- 2018 Student Selected ECS Speaker (Indiana University)
- 2018 Michigan State University Alumni Lectureship Award
- 2019 UW-Madison Villas Faculty Mid-Career Investigator Award
- 2023 American Association for the Advancement of Science Fellow
- 2023 Ho-Am Prize in Science Chemistry and Life Sciences
- 2024 American Academy of Arts and Sciences Fellow
