= Jerry L. Atwood =

American chemist (1942-)

Jerry Lee Atwood
- Born: 1942 (age 83–84); Springfield, Missouri
- Education: Southwest Missouri State College; University of Illinois at Urbana-Champaign
- Scientific career
- Fields: Chemistry
- Workplaces: University of Alabama; University of Missouri

Jerry Lee Atwood (born 1942) is an American supramolecular chemist. He is currently a Curators' Distinguished Professor in Chemistry at the University of Missouri. He is an international leader in Supramolecular chemistry. He has developed the field by his research and by writing a text book on Supramolecular Chemistry.

== Education and early life ==
Jerry Atwood was born in Springfield, Missouri. He attended Southwest Missouri State College, graduating with a Bachelor of Science degree in 1964. He received his PhD from the University of Illinois at Urbana–Champaign in 1968.

== Career and research ==
Atwood was appointed as an assistant professor at the University of Alabama and was named a full professor in 1978. In 1994, he was appointed as a chair and professor in the department of chemistry with the University of Missouri.

== Awards and honors ==
Atwood is a recipient of the most prestigious Izatt-Christensen International Macrocyclic Chemistry Award. He has also received an honorary doctor of science degree from the University of South Florida. Atwood also received an honor PREFACE from the University of Georgia.
