= Harry Atwater =

Professor of applied physics / materials science

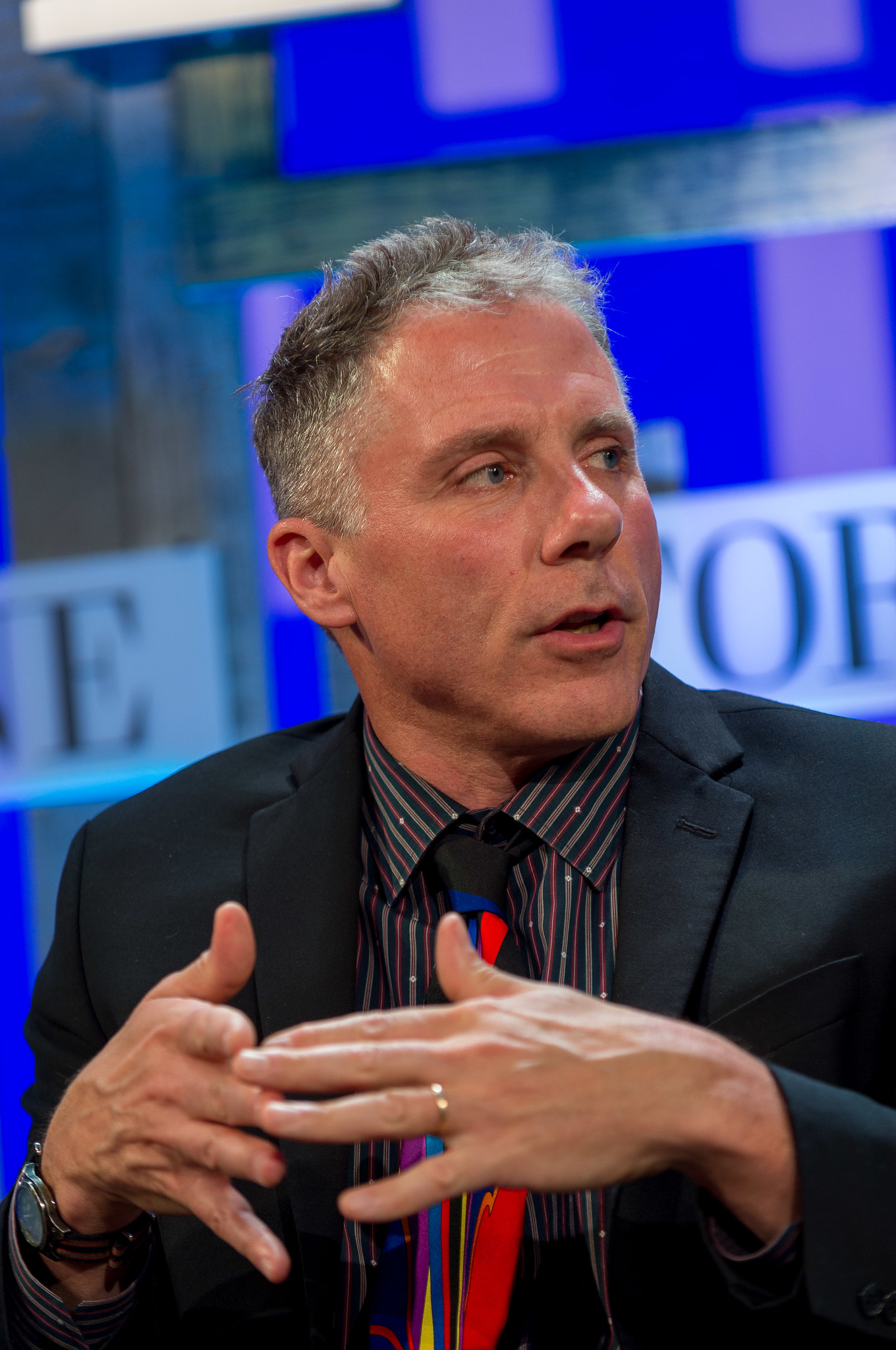
- Atwater in 2014
- Born: Harry Albert Atwater, Jr.
- Education: Massachusetts Institute of Technology
- Scientific career
- Fields: Photonics; Metamaterials; Plasmonics
- Workplaces: California Institute of Technology
- Thesis: Ion beam enhanced grain growth in thin films (1987)
- Doctoral advisors: Henry I. Smith; Carl V. Thompson
- Doctoral students: Jennifer Dionne; Prineha Narang; Emily Warren; Vivian Ferry

Harry Albert Atwater Jr. is an American physicist and materials scientist and is the Otis Booth Leadership Chair of the division of engineering and applied science at the California Institute of Technology. Currently he is the Howard Hughes Professor of Applied Physics and Materials Science and the director for the Liquid Sunlight Alliance (LiSA), a Department of Energy Hub program for solar fuels. Atwater's scientific effort focuses on nanophotonic light–matter interactions and solar energy conversion. His current research in energy centers on high efficiency photovoltaics, carbon capture and removal, and photoelectrochemical processes for generation of solar fuels. His research has resulted in world records for solar photovoltaic conversion and photoelectrochemical water splitting. His work also spans fundamental nanophotonic phenomena, in plasmonics and 2D materials, and also applications including active metasurfaces and optical propulsion.

From 2014 to 2020, Atwater served as director of the Joint Center for Artificial Photosynthesis (JCAP), the DOE Energy Innovation Hub for solar fuels. Atwater was an early pioneer in nanophotonics and plasmonics; he gave the name to the field of plasmonics in 2001. Atwater is a Member of US National Academy of Engineering, and a Web of Science Highly Cited Researcher. He is also founder of 5 early-stage companies, including Captura, which is developing scalable approaches to carbon dioxide removal from oceanwater, and Alta Devices, which set world records for photovoltaic cell and module efficiency. He is also a Fellow of the SPIE as well as APS, MRS, Optica, and the National Academy of Inventors. He is also the founding editor in chief of the journal ACS Photonics, and chair of the LightSail Committee for the Breakthrough Starshot program. He is the recipient of numerous awards, including the 2021 Von Hippel Award of the Materials Research Society.

== Biography ==
Atwater received his S.B. (1981), S.M. (1983), and Ph.D. (1987) in electrical engineering from the Massachusetts Institute of Technology. He serves as director of the DOE Energy Frontier Research Center on Light-Material Interactions in Solar Energy Conversion and was named director of the Resnick Institute for Science, Energy and Sustainability, Caltech's largest endowed research program focused on energy. Atwater is founder and chief technical advisor for Alta Devices, a venture-backed company in Santa Clara, CA developing a transformational high efficiency/low cost photovoltaics technology, and Aonex Corporation, a compound semiconductor materials company. He has also served an editorial board member for Surface Review and Letters. Professor Atwater has actively served the materials community in various capacities, including Materials Research Society Meeting Chair (1997), Materials Research Society President (2000), AVS Electronic Materials and Processing Division Chair (1999), and board of trustees of the Gordon Research Conferences. In 2008, he served as chair for the Gordon Research Conference on Plasmonics. Since 2014, he has served as the editor-in-chief of the journal ACS Photonics, published by the American Chemical Society. In 2015, Atwater was elected as a member into the National Academy of Engineering for his contributions to plasmonics.

== Research ==
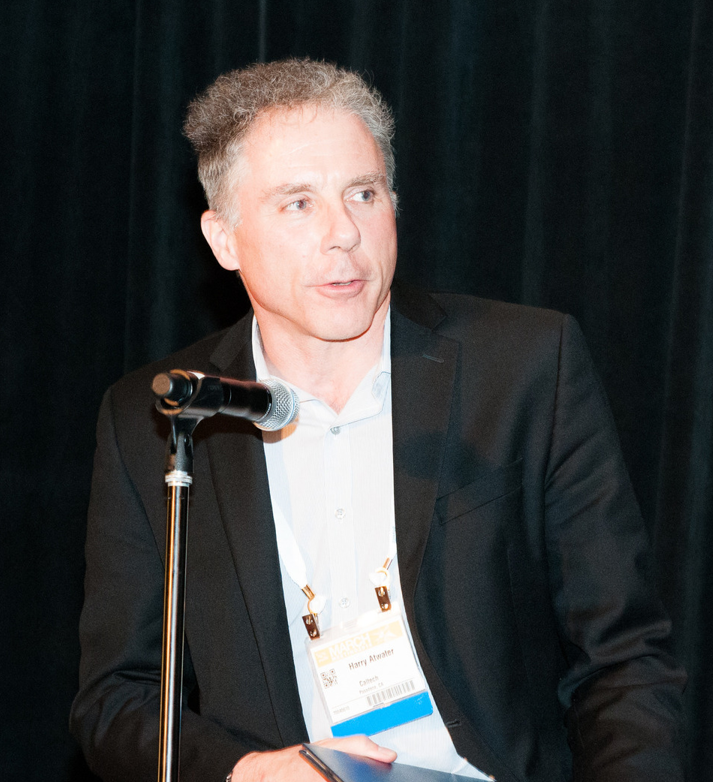
Harry Atwater presenting at the annual American Physical Society Conference in 2018

Atwater's research interests center around two interwoven research themes: photovoltaics and solar energy; and plasmonics and optical metamaterials. Atwater and his group have been active in photovoltaics research for more than 20 years. Together, Atwater and his group have created new photovoltaic devices, including the silicon wire array solar cell, and layer-transferred fabrication approaches to III-V semiconductor III-V and multijunction cells, as well as making advances in plasmonic light absorber structures for III-V compound and silicon thin films. His research group's developments in the solar and plasmonics fields have been featured in Scientific American and in research papers such as Science, Nature Materials, Nature Photonics and Advanced Materials.

Recently, his research has expanded to include the study of artificial photosynthesis to design fully-integrated photoelectrochemical (PEC) device for the production of renewable fuels. Additionally, Atwater's group is currently investigating the distinctive material characteristics of graphene as they relate to plasmonics that can be adjusted. Through the process of designing Fabry–Perot nanoresonators (small optical structures that consist of two parallel mirrors or reflectors separated by a nanoscale gap) onto a graphene sheet that has been doped and patterned, the Atwater group aims to observe a plasmonic resonance that changes in accordance with the size of the resonator.

== Awards ==
Atwater is a member of the National Academy of Engineering and an MRS Fellow. He has been honored by awards including

- Von Hippel Award from the Materials Research Society 2021;
- 2021 ENI award for Renewable and Non-Conventional Energy;
- MRS Kavli Lecturer in Nanoscience in 2010;
- Popular Mechanics Breakthrough Award, 2010;
- Joop Los Fellowship from the Dutch Society for Fundamental Research on Matter in 2005;
- A.T. & T. Foundation Award, 1990;
- NSF Presidential Young Investigator Award, 1989;
- IBM Faculty Development Award, 1989–1990;
- Member, Bohmische Physical Society, 1990;
- IBM Postdoctoral Fellowship, 1987.

== Selected publications ==
- Enright, Michael J.; Jasrasaria, Dipti; Hanchard, Mathilde M.; Needell, David R.; Phelan, Megan E.; Weinberg, Daniel; McDowell, Brinn E.; Hsiao, Haw-Wen; Akbari, Hamidreza; Kottwitz, Matthew; Potter, Maggie M.; Wong, Joeson; Zuo, Jian-Min; Atwater, Harry A.; Rabani, Eran (2022-05-05). "Role of Atomic Structure on Exciton Dynamics and Photoluminescence in NIR Emissive InAs/InP/ZnSe Quantum Dots". The Journal of Physical Chemistry C. 126 (17): 7576–7587. doi:10.1021/acs.jpcc.2c01499. ISSN 1932-7447
- Sullivan, Ian; Goryachev, Andrey; Digdaya, Ibadillah A.; Li, Xueqian; Atwater, Harry A.; Vermaas, David A.; Xiang, Chengxiang (November 2021). "Coupling electrochemical CO2 conversion with CO2 capture". Nature Catalysis. 4 (11): 952–958. doi:10.1038/s41929-021-00699-7. ISSN 2520-1158
- Digdaya, Ibadillah A.; Sullivan, Ian; Lin, Meng; Han, Lihao; Cheng, Wen-Hui; Atwater, Harry A.; Xiang, Chengxiang (2020-09-04). "A direct coupled electrochemical system for capture and conversion of CO2 from oceanwater". Nature Communications. 11 (1): 4412. doi:10.1038/s41467-020-18232-y. ISSN 2041-1723
- Ilic, Ognjen; Atwater, Harry A. (2019–04). "Self-stabilizing photonic levitation and propulsion of nanostructured macroscopic objects". Nature Photonics. 13 (4): 289–295. doi:10.1038/s41566-019-0373-y. ISSN 1749-4893
- R. Shaner, Matthew; A. Atwater, Harry; S. Lewis, Nathan; W. McFarland, Eric (2016). "A comparative technoeconomic analysis of renewable hydrogen production using solar energy". Energy & Environmental Science. 9 (7): 2354–2371. doi:10.1039/C5EE02573G
- Callahan, Dennis M.; Munday, Jeremy N.; Atwater, Harry A. (2012-01-11). "Solar Cell Light Trapping beyond the Ray Optic Limit". Nano Letters. 12 (1): 214–218. doi:10.1021/nl203351k. ISSN 1530-6984
- Yokogawa, Sozo; Burgos, Stanley P.; Atwater, Harry A. (2012-08-08). "Plasmonic Color Filters for CMOS Image Sensor Applications". Nano Letters. 12 (8): 4349–4354. doi:10.1021/nl302110z. ISSN 1530-6984.
- Aydin, Koray; Ferry, Vivian E.; Briggs, Ryan M.; Atwater, Harry A. (2011). "Broadband polarization-independent resonant light absorption using ultrathin plasmonic super absorbers." Nature Communications. 2 (1): 517.
- Boltasseva, A.; Atwater, H. A. (2011). "Low-Loss Plasmonic Metamaterials". Science. 331 (6015): 290–291. Bibcode:2011Sci...331..290B. doi:10.1126/science.1198258. ISSN 0036-8075. PMID 21252335. S2CID 206530073.
- Atwater, Harry A.; Polman, Albert (2010). "Plasmonics for improved photovoltaic devices". Nature Materials. 9 (3): 205–213. Bibcode:2010NatMa...9..205A. doi:10.1038/nmat2629. ISSN 1476-1122. PMID 20168344. S2CID 15160240.
- Ferry, Vivian E.; Munday, Jeremy N.; Atwater, Harry A. (2010-11-16). "Design Considerations for Plasmonic Photovoltaics". Advanced Materials. 22 (43): 4794–4808. doi:10.1002/adma.201000488
- Ferry, Vivian E.; Verschuuren, Marc A.; Li, Hongbo B. T.; Verhagen, Ewold; Walters, Robert J.; Schropp, Ruud E. I.; Atwater, Harry A.; Polman, Albert (2010-06-21). "Light trapping in ultrathin plasmonic solar cells". Optics Express. 18 (102): A237–A245. doi:10.1364/OE.18.00A237. ISSN 1094-4087.
- Dionne, Jennifer A.; Diest, Kenneth; Sweatlock, Luke A.; Atwater, Harry A. (2009-02-11). "PlasMOStor: A Metal−Oxide−Si Field Effect Plasmonic Modulator". Nano Letters. 9 (2): 897–902. doi:10.1021/nl803868k. ISSN 1530-6984.
- Ferry, Vivian E.; Sweatlock, Luke A.; Pacifici, Domenico; Atwater, Harry A. (2008-12-10). "Plasmonic Nanostructure Design for Efficient Light Coupling into Solar Cells". Nano Letters. 8 (12): 4391–4397. doi:10.1021/nl8022548. ISSN 1530-6984.
- Atwater, Harry A. (2007). "The Promise of Plasmonics". Scientific American. 296 (4): 56–62. Bibcode:2007SciAm.296d..56A. doi:10.1038/scientificamerican0407-56. ISSN 0036-8733. PMID 17479631.
- Lezec, H. J.; Dionne, J. A.; Atwater, H. A. (2007). "Negative Refraction at Visible Frequencies". Science. 316 (5823): 430–432. Bibcode:2007Sci...316..430L. CiteSeerX 10.1.1.422.9475. doi:10.1126/science.1139266. ISSN 0036-8075. PMID 17379773. S2CID 35189301.
- Pacifici, Domenico; Lezec, Henri J.; Atwater, Harry A. (2007). "All-optical modulation by plasmonic excitation of CdSe quantum dots". Nature Photonics. 1 (7): 402–406. Bibcode:2007NaPho...1..402P. doi:10.1038/nphoton.2007.95. ISSN 1749-4885. S2CID 14915006.
- Atwater, Harry A. (2007). "The Promise of PLASMONICS". Scientific American. 296 (4): 56–63. ISSN 0036-8733.
- Walters, Robert J.; Bourianoff, George I.; Atwater, Harry A. (2005). "Field-effect electroluminescence in silicon nanocrystals". Nature Materials. 4 (2): 143–146. Bibcode:2005NatMa...4..143W. CiteSeerX 10.1.1.422.8799. doi:10.1038/nmat1307. ISSN 1476-1122. PMID 15665836. S2CID 42069839.
- Maier, Stefan A.; Kik, Pieter G.; Atwater, Harry A.; Meltzer, Sheffer; Harel, Elad; Koel, Bruce E.; Requicha, Ari A.G. (2003). "Local detection of electromagnetic energy transport below the diffraction limit in metal nanoparticle plasmon waveguides". Nature Materials. 2 (4): 229–232. Bibcode:2003NatMa...2..229M. doi:10.1038/nmat852. ISSN 1476-1122. PMID 12690394. S2CID 680268.

== External links/sources ==
- Atwater's profile at Caltech
- Atwater Research Group Website
- Light-Material Interactions in Energy Conversion Energy Frontier Research Center
- Resnick Institute
- ENI Award homepage
- Harry A. Atwater: SPIE Photonics West plenary presentation: Tunable and Quantum Metaphotonics
