= Prineha Narang =

American scientist

- Born: September 27, 1989 (age 37)
- Education: Drexel University; California Institute of Technology
- Scientific career
- Fields: Computational Physics; Condensed Matter Physics; Theoretical Chemistry; Computational Materials Science; Photonics; Quantum Information Science; Plasmonics
- Workplaces: University of California, Los Angeles; Harvard University
- Thesis: Light-Matter Interactions in Semiconductors and Metals: From Nitride Optoelectronics to Quantum Plasmonics (2015)
- Doctoral advisors: Harry Atwater
- Other academic advisors: Postdoctoral Advisors: Marin Soljacic; John Joannopoulos

Prineha Narang (born September 27, 1989) is an American physicist and computational material scientist. She is a Professor of Physical Sciences and Electrical and Computer Engineering, and Howard Reiss Chair, at the University of California, Los Angeles (UCLA), where she studies computational science, condensed matter theory, quantum photonics, and quantum information science.

Narang's work has been recognized with the Mildred Dresselhaus Prize, the 2021 IUPAP Young Scientist Prize in Computational Physics, a Friedrich Wilhelm Bessel Research Award (Bessel Prize) from the Alexander von Humboldt Foundation, and a Max Planck Sabbatical Award from the Max Planck Society. Narang also received a National Science Foundation CAREER Award in 2020, was named a Moore Inventor Fellow by the Gordon and Betty Moore Foundation for the development for a fundamentally new strategy for using picoscale quantum sensors, CIFAR Azrieli Global Scholar by the Canadian Institute for Advanced Research, and a Top Innovator by MIT Tech Review (MIT TR35). Narang was awarded a Guggenheim Fellowship in 2023 and elected a Fellow of the American Physical Society (APS) in 2024.

In 2023, she was appointed a United States Science Envoy by the United States Department of State, a role to which she was reappointed in 2024. In this capacity, she works to advance American quantum science, technology, and innovation on the international stage.

In 2025, Narang joined DCVC, as the Silicon Valley-based deep-tech venture capital firm doubled down on quantum tech leadership.

== Early life and education ==
Narang earned her Bachelor's degree at Drexel University where she worked with Yury Gogotsi on nanomaterials. She received an M.S. and Ph.D. in Applied Physics from the California Institute of Technology (Caltech) in 2015 working with Harry A. Atwater on light–matter interactions.. Her Ph.D thesis was titled "Light-Matter Interactions in Semiconductors and Metals: From Nitride Optoelectronics to Quantum Plasmonics." At Caltech, Narang was a Resnick Fellow and a NSF Graduate Research Fellow.

Narang began her career as a Fellow at Harvard University Center for the Environment and then an Assistant Professor in the John A. Paulson School of Engineering and Applied Sciences at Harvard University.

== Academic career ==
Narang was elected to the Caltech Board of Trustees in 2023.

Narang was appointed to the Science Advisory Council of arXiv, a research-sharing platform.

Narang is an Associate Editor at ACS Nano of the American Chemical Society, an Associate Editor at Applied Physics Letters of the American Institute of Physics, and on the Editorial Advisory Boards of Nano Letters, APL Quantum, and Advanced Photonics.

== Research focus ==
Narang joined Harvard University as a Ziff Environmental Fellow in the Harvard University Center for the Environment. In 2016, Narang joined Massachusetts Institute of Technology and worked as a Research Scholar at MIT with Marin Soljacic and John Joannopolous in condensed matter theory, where she worked on the development of computation models to predict quantum interactions. In particular, Narang looks to better understand excited state and non-equilibrium phenomena. These findings are used to inform the design of new materials and devices. Narang is interested in the bottom-up design of optimised materials, which requires atom-by-atom engineering.

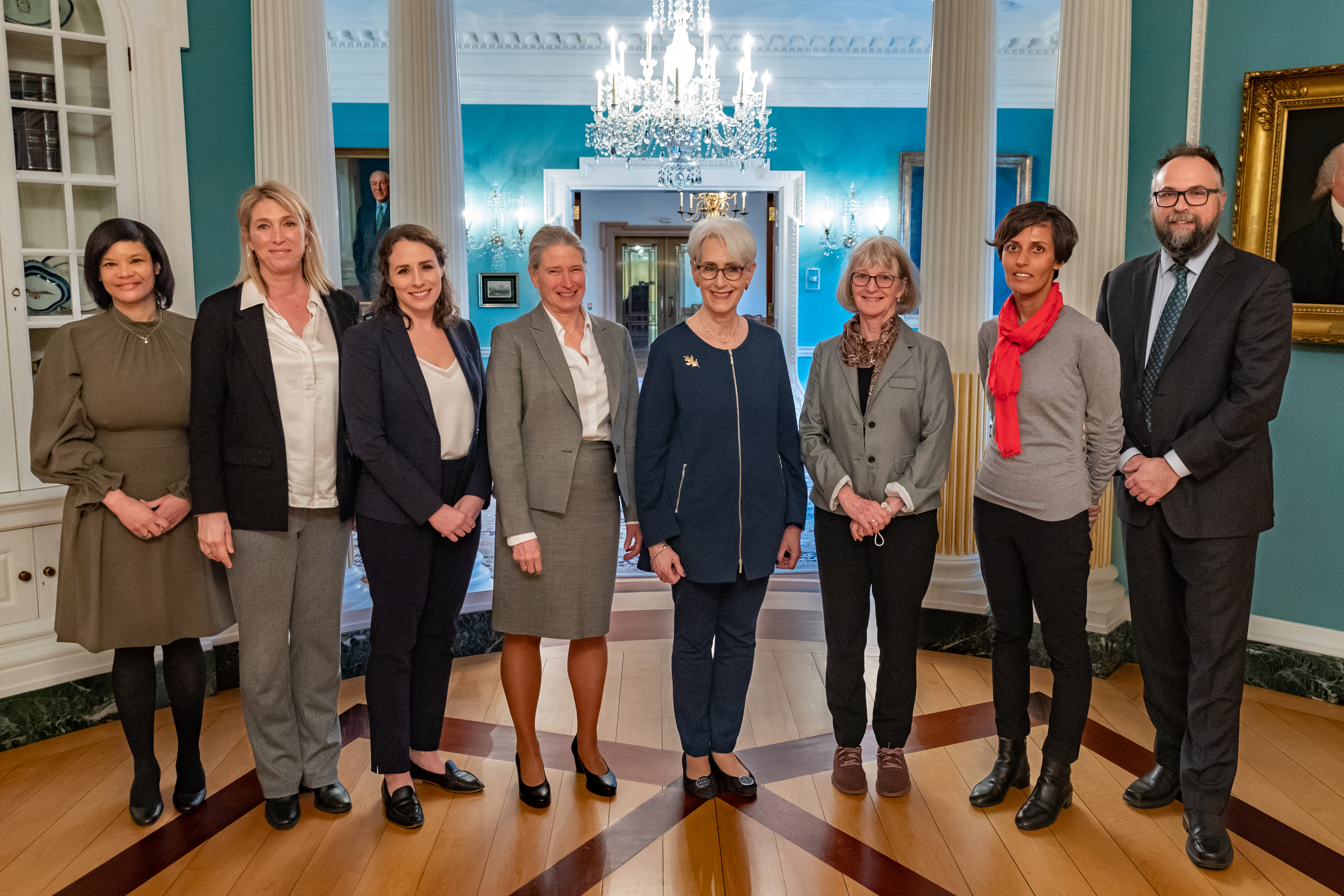
Narang with a cohort of science envoys meeting with Wendy Sherman in 2023

In 2017, Narang was appointed to the faculty of the Harvard John A. Paulson School of Engineering and Applied Sciences. She designed a quantum sensing device that can detect and identify isolated molecules. Beyond light–matter interactions, Narang has pioneered development of solid-state quantum repeaters, nanoscale devices that can store quantum information and convert it into photons by predicting color centers in 2D and 3D materials. A precise understanding of light–matter interactions might allow the design of novel catalytic systems, where energy transfer pathways and the energetic landscape of chemical reactions can be manipulated through the coupling of light and matter.

As an assistant professor of computational materials science at Harvard, Narang studied the optical, thermal, and electronic behavior of materials at the nanoscale to enable a new generation of technologies. Since 2022, her interdisciplinary group, NarangLab, moved to UCLA, where she and her team continue to explore topics at the intersection of computational science, condensed matter theory, quantum photonics, and quantum information science. Her upcoming move was recently covered by Inside Quantum Technology. Narang's work builds on decades of advances in nanoscience that have brought the field closer to a long-held goal: the ability to engineer materials atom by atom.

In 2023 she was appointed a U.S. Science Envoy by the Secretary of State; she was reappointed to the role in 2024 advancing American quantum science, technology, and innovation internationally.

In 2025, Narang joined DCVC, as the Silicon Valley-based deep-tech venture capital firm doubled down on quantum tech leadership.

Narang holds leadership roles in various Department of Energy, Department of Defense and National Science Foundation centers, and her service work includes Chairing the Materials Research Society (MRS) Spring Meeting (2022) and the MRS-Kavli Foundation Future of Materials Workshop: Computational Materials Science (2021), as an Associate Editor for ACS Nano, and most recently a leadership role in APS' Division of Materials Physics.

Narang developed an undergraduate program in quantum engineering.

== Awards and honors ==
- 2017 Forbes 30 Under 30
- 2018 World Economic Forum Young Global Leaders
- 2018 MIT Technology Review TR35 Innovator
- 2018 CIFAR Azrieli Global Scholar
- 2018 Gordon and Betty Moore Foundation Moore Inventor Fellow
- 2020 National Science Foundation CAREER Award
- 2021 IUPAP Young Scientist Prize in Computational Physics for her "pioneering achievements in computational nanophotonics, quantum plasmonics and ab initio descriptions of ultrafast dynamics in quantum materials"
- 2021 Max Planck Sabbatical Award from the Max Planck Society
- 2021 Friedrich Wilhelm Bessel Research Award (Bessel Award) from the Alexander von Humboldt Foundation
- 2021 Mildred Dresselhaus Prize for her "outstanding contributions to the field of quantum science and technology".
- 2022 Outstanding Early Career Investigator Award from the Materials Research Society. Narang was selected "for critical advances in the understanding of materials physics, optical sciences and topology for the prediction and design of quantum materials."
- 2023 Maria Goeppert Mayer Award from the American Physical Society for "For pioneering the development of ab initio computational physics approaches to light-matter coupling and non-equilibrium dynamics and their application to the understanding, prediction, and design of quantum materials."
- 2023 Guggenheim Fellowship from the John Simon Guggenheim Memorial Foundation in Physics.
- 2024 American Physical Society (APS) Fellowship elected Fellow of the American Physical Society (APS), where her award citation reads 'For important theoretical and computational approaches to nonequilibrium dynamics and ab initio quantum electrodynamical control of condensed matter, as well as prominent public advocacy for quantum sciences.'

== Selected publications ==
- Ana M Brown; Ravishankar Sundararaman; Narang, Prineha; William A Goddard; Atwater, Harry (2015). "Nonradiative Plasmon Decay and Hot Carrier Dynamics: Effects of Phonons, Surfaces, and Geometry". ACS Nano. 10 (1): 957–966. doi:10.1021/acsnano.5b06199. PMID 26654729. Wikidata Q45959898.
- Ravishankar Sundararaman; Narang, Prineha; Adam S Jermyn; William A Goddard; Atwater, Harry (2014). "Theoretical predictions for hot-carrier generation from surface plasmon decay". Nature Communications. 5: 5788. Bibcode:2014NatCo...5.5788S. doi:10.1038/ncomms6788. PMC 4284641. PMID 25511713. Wikidata Q30421009.
- Emiliano Cortés; Wei Xie; Javier Cambiasso; Adam S Jermyn; Ravishankar Sundararaman; Narang, Prineha; Sebastian Schlücker; Maier, Stefan (2017). "Plasmonic hot electron transport drives nano-localized chemistry". Nature Communications. 8 14880. Bibcode:2017NatCo...814880C. doi:10.1038/ncomms14880. PMC 5379059. PMID 28348402. Wikidata Q42292925.
- Flick, J., and Narang, P. (2018). "Cavity-correlated electron-nuclear dynamics from first principles." Physical Review Letters, 121 (11), 113002.
- Coulter, J., Sundararaman, R., and Narang, P. (2018). "Microscopic origins of hydro-dynamic transport in the type-II Weyl semimetal WP2". Physical Review B, 98 (11), 115130
- Rivera, N., Flick, J., and Narang, P. (2019). "Variational theory of non-relativistic quantum electrodynamics." Physical Review Letters, 122 (19), 193603
- "Quantum Information and Algorithms for Correlated Quantum Matter"Kade Head-Marsden, Johannes Flick, Christopher J. Ciccarino, and Prineha Narang Cite this: Chem. Rev. 2021, 121, 5, 3061–3120
- Prineha Narang, Christina A. C. Garcia & Claudia Felser, "The topology of electronic band structures Nature Materials volume 20", pages 293–300 (2021) (link)
- Varnavides, G., Jermyn, A.S., Anikeeva, P., Felser, C., & Narang, P. (2020). "Electron hydrodynamics in anisotropic materials. Nature Communications" 11, 4710.
- Vool, U., Hamo, A., Varnavides, G., Wang, Y., Zhou, T.X., Kumar, N., Dovzhenko, Y., Qiu, Z., Garcia, C.A.C., Pierce, A.T., Gooth, J., Anikeeva, P., Felser, C., Narang, P. & Yacoby, A. (2021). "Imaging phonon-mediated hydrodynamic flow in WTe2 with cryogenic quantum magnetometry." Nature Physics.
