= ACS Photonics =

- Discipline: Optical science, Material science, Nano science
- Language: English
- Edited by: Romain Quidant

Publication details
- History: 2014–present
- Publisher: American Chemical Society (United States)
- Frequency: Monthly
- Impact factor: 6.7 (2024)

Standard abbreviations
- ISO 4: ACS Photonics

Indexing
- CODEN: APCHD5
- ISSN: 2330-4022

Links
- Journal homepage

ACS Photonics is a monthly, peer-reviewed, scientific journal, first published in January 2014 by the American Chemical Society. The current editor in chief is Romain Quidant (ETH Zurich). The interdisciplinary journal publishes original research articles, letters, comments, reviews and perspectives.

== Scope ==
The focus of ACS Photonics is the science of photonics and light–matter interactions. The areas of research reported in the journal are:

- Nanophotonics, including plasmonics and polaritonics
- Optical materials, including quantum/topological materials, 2D materials and phase change materials
- AI for photonics (e.g. Inverse design) and photonics for AI (e.g. optical computing)
- Integrated photonics
- Light sources, including new classes of lasing devices and LED with improved performance and new integration strategies
- Photodetection, including new device principles, device physics and device architectures
- Nonlinear optics
- Quantum photonics
- Photonics-based wearables
- Virtual and augmented reality
- Photonics for energy, including photonic enhancement to solar energy harvesting, waste heat harvesting (thermophotovoltaics), and wireless photonic energy transmission
- Biophotonics, advanced optical imaging, photonics-based biosensing
- Optical trapping and optical manipulation
- Optomechanics
- Fundamentals of light–matter interaction
- Electron-beam spectroscopies and ultrafast electron microscopy
- Terahertz photonics, including devices, imaging and spectroscopy

== Abstracting and indexing ==
ACS Photonics is indexed in the following databases:

- Chemical Abstracts Service – CASSI
- Chemistry Citation Index
- Science Citation Index Expanded
- Current Contents – Engineering, Computing & Technology
- Current Contents - Physical, Chemical & Earth Sciences
- Scopus
- MEDLINE/PubMed

According to the 2015 Journal Citation Reports published by Thomson Reuters on June 13, 2016, ACS Photonics has received its first impact factor of 5.404. According to the Journal Citation Reports, the journal has a 2023 impact factor of 6.5.
