= Joint Center for Artificial Photosynthesis =

The Joint Center for Artificial Photosynthesis (JCAP), founded in 2010, is a (DOE) Energy Innovation Hub whose primary mission is to find a cost-effective method to produce fuels using only sunlight, water, and carbon-dioxide. The program has a budget of $122M over five years, subject to Congressional appropriation.

The Director of JCAP is Professor Harry Atwater and its two main centers are located at the California Institute of Technology and the Lawrence Berkeley National Laboratory. In addition, JCAP has partners from Stanford University, the University of California, Berkeley, University of California, Santa Barbara, University of California, Irvine, the University of California, San Diego, and SLAC National Accelerator Laboratory. In addition, JCAP also serves as a hub for other solar fuels research teams across the United States, including 20 DOE Energy Frontier Research Center.

In Obama's 2011 State of the Union address, he mentioned the Joint Center for Artificial Photosynthesis. Specifically, he said, "We're issuing a challenge. We're telling America's scientists and engineers that if they assemble teams of the best minds in their fields, and focus on the hardest problems in clean energy, we'll fund the Apollo projects of our time. At the California Institute of Technology, they're developing a way to turn sunlight and water into fuel for our cars".

== See also ==
- Artificial Photosynthesis
