= Nanophotonics =

Study of light on the nanometer scale

Nanophotonics or nano-optics is the study of the behavior of light on the nanometer scale, and of the interaction of nanometer-scale objects with light. It is a branch of optics, optical engineering, electrical engineering, and nanotechnology. It often involves dielectric structures such as nanoantennas, or metallic components, which can transport and focus light via surface plasmon polaritons.

The term "nano-optics", just like the term "optics", usually refers to situations involving ultraviolet, visible, and near-infrared light (free-space wavelengths from 300 to 1200 nanometers).

== Background ==
Normal optical components, like lenses and microscopes, generally cannot normally focus light to nanometer (deep subwavelength) scales, because of the diffraction limit (Rayleigh criterion). Nevertheless, it is possible to squeeze light into a nanometer scale using other techniques like, for example, surface plasmons, localized surface plasmons around nanoscale metal objects, and the nanoscale apertures and nanoscale sharp tips used in near-field scanning optical microscopy (SNOM or NSOM) and photoassisted scanning tunnelling microscopy.

== Application ==
Nanophotonics researchers pursue a very wide variety of goals, in fields ranging from biochemistry to electrical engineering to carbon-free energy. A few of these goals are summarized below.

=== Optoelectronics and microelectronics ===
If light can be squeezed into a small volume, it can be absorbed and detected by a small detector. Small photodetectors tend to have a variety of desirable properties including low noise, high speed, and low voltage and power.

Small lasers have various desirable properties for optical communication including low threshold current (which helps power efficiency) and fast modulation (which means more data transmission). Very small lasers require subwavelength optical cavities. An example is spasers, the surface plasmon version of lasers.

Integrated circuits are made using photolithography, i.e. exposure to light. In order to make very small transistors, the light needs to be focused into extremely sharp images. Using various techniques such as immersion lithography and phase-shifting photomasks, it has indeed been possible to make images much finer than the wavelength—for example, drawing 30 nm lines using 193 nm light. Plasmonic techniques have also been proposed for this application.

Heat-assisted magnetic recording is a nanophotonic approach to increasing the amount of data that a magnetic disk drive can store. It requires a laser to heat a tiny, subwavelength area of the magnetic material before writing data. The magnetic write-head would have metal optical components to concentrate light at the right location.

Miniaturization in optoelectronics, for example the miniaturization of transistors in integrated circuits, has improved their speed and cost. However, optoelectronic circuits can only be miniaturized if the optical components are shrunk along with the electronic components. This is relevant for on-chip optical communication (i.e. passing information from one part of a microchip to another by sending light through optical waveguides, instead of changing the voltage on a wire).

=== Solar cells ===
Solar cells often work best when the light is absorbed very close to the surface, both because electrons near the surface have a better chance of being collected, and because the device can be made thinner, which reduces cost. Researchers have investigated a variety of nanophotonic techniques to intensify light in the optimal locations within a solar cell.

=== Controlled release of anti-cancer therapeutics ===
Nanophotonics has also been implicated in aiding the controlled and on-demand release of anti-cancer therapeutics like adriamycin from nanoporous optical antennas to target triple-negative breast cancer and mitigate exocytosis anti-cancer drug resistance mechanisms and therefore circumvent toxicity to normal systemic tissues and cells.

=== Spectroscopy ===
Using nanophotonics to create high peak intensities: If a given amount of light energy is squeezed into a smaller and smaller volume ("hot-spot"), the intensity in the hot-spot gets larger and larger. This is especially helpful in nonlinear optics; an example is surface-enhanced Raman scattering. It also allows sensitive spectroscopy measurements of even single molecules located in the hot-spot, unlike traditional spectroscopy methods which take an average over millions or billions of molecules.

=== Microscopy ===
One goal of nanophotonics is to construct a so-called "superlens", which would use metamaterials (see below) or other techniques to create images that are more accurate than the diffraction limit (deep subwavelength). In 1995, John M. Guerra demonstrated this by imaging a silicon grating having 50 nm lines and spaces with illumination having 650 nm wavelength in air. This was accomplished by coupling a transparent phase grating having 50 nm lines and spaces (metamaterial) with an immersion microscope objective (superlens).

Near-field scanning optical microscope (NSOM or SNOM) is a quite different nanophotonic technique that accomplishes the same goal of taking images with resolution far smaller than the wavelength. It involves raster-scanning a very sharp tip or very small aperture over the surface to be imaged.

Near-field microscopy refers more generally to any technique using the near-field (see below) to achieve nanoscale, subwavelength resolution. In 1987, John M. Guerra (while at the Polaroid Corporation) achieved this with a non-scanning whole-field Photon tunneling microscope. In another example, dual-polarization interferometry has picometer resolution in the vertical plane above the waveguide surface.

=== Optical data storage ===
Nanophotonics in the form of subwavelength near-field optical structures, either separate from the recording media, or integrated into the recording media, were first used by John M. Guerra and his team to achieve optical recording densities much higher than the diffraction limit allows. This work began in the 1980s at Polaroid Optical Engineering (Cambridge, Massachusetts), and continued under license at Calimetrics (Bedford, Massachusetts) with support from the NIST Advanced Technology Program.

=== Band-gap engineering ===
In 2002, John M. Guerra (Nanoptek Corporation) demonstrated that nano-optical structures of semiconductors exhibit bandgap shifts because of induced strain. In the case of titanium dioxide, structures on the order of less than 200 nm half-height width will absorb not only in the normal ultraviolet part of the solar spectrum, but well into the high-energy visible blue as well. In 2008, Thulin and Guerra published modeling that showed not only bandgap shift, but also band-edge shift, and higher hole mobility for lower charge recombination. The band-gap engineered titanium dioxide is used as a photoanode in efficient photolytic and photo-electro-chemical production of hydrogen fuel from sunlight and water.

=== Silicon nanophotonics ===
Silicon photonics is a silicon-based subfield of nanophotonics in which nano-scale structures of the optoelectronic devices realized on silicon substrates and that are capable to control both light and electrons. They allow to couple electronic and optical functionality in one single device. Such devices find a wide variety of applications outside of academic settings, e.g. mid-infrared and overtone spectroscopy, logic gates and cryptography on a chip etc.

As of 2016 the research of in silicon photonics spanned light modulators, optical waveguides and interconnectors, optical amplifiers, photodetectors, memory elements, photonic crystals etc.

Efficiently generating electrical energy from solar light (for solar panels) is an area of particular interest for silicon nanostructures.

== Principles ==
=== Plasmons and metal optics ===
Metals are an effective way to confine light to far below the wavelength. This was originally used in radio and microwave engineering, where metal antennas and waveguides may be hundreds of times smaller than the free-space wavelength. For a similar reason, visible light can be confined to the nano-scale via nano-sized metal structures, such as nano-sized structures, tips, gaps, etc. Many nano-optics designs look like common microwave or radiowave circuits, but shrunk down by a factor of 100,000 or more. After all, radiowaves, microwaves, and visible light are all electromagnetic radiation; they differ only in frequency. So other things equal, a microwave circuit shrunk down by a factor of 100,000 will behave the same way but at 100,000 times higher frequency. This effect is somewhat analogous to a lightning rod, where the field concentrates at the tip. The technological field that makes use of the interaction between light and metals is called plasmonics. It is fundamentally based on the fact that the permittivity of the metal is very large and negative. At very high frequencies (near and above the plasma frequency, usually ultraviolet), the permittivity of a metal is not so large, and the metal stops being useful for concentrating fields.

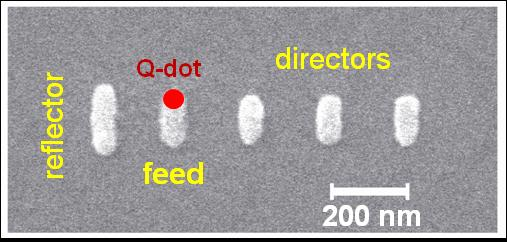
Scanning electron microscopy (SEM) image of a five-element Yagi-Uda antenna consisting of a feed element, one reflector, and three directors, fabricated by e-beam lithography.

For example, researchers have made nano-optical dipoles and Yagi–Uda antennas following essentially the same design as used for radio antennas.

Metallic parallel-plate waveguides (striplines), lumped-constant circuit elements such as inductance and capacitance (at visible light frequencies, the values of the latter being of the order of femtohenries and attofarads, respectively), and impedance-matching of dipole antennas to transmission lines, all familiar techniques at microwave frequencies, are some current areas of nanophotonics development. That said, there are a number of very important differences between nano-optics and scaled-down microwave circuits. For example, at optical frequency, metals behave much less like ideal conductors, and also exhibit interesting plasmon-related effects like kinetic inductance and surface plasmon resonance. Likewise, optical fields interact with semiconductors in a fundamentally different way than microwaves do.

=== Near-field optics ===
Fourier transform of a spatial field distribution consists of different spatial frequencies. The higher spatial frequencies correspond to the very fine features and sharp edges.

In nanophotonics, strongly localized radiation sources (dipolar emitters such as fluorescent molecules) are often studied. These sources can be decomposed into a vast spectrum of plane waves with different wavenumbers, which correspond to the angular spatial frequencies. The frequency components with higher wavenumbers compared to the free-space wavenumber of the light form evanescent fields. Evanescent components exist only in the near field of the emitter and decay without transferring net energy to the far field. Thus, subwavelength information from the emitter is blurred out; this results in the diffraction limit in the optical systems.

Nanophotonics is primarily concerned with the near-field evanescent waves. For example, a superlens (mentioned above) would prevent the decay of the evanescent wave, allowing higher-resolution imaging.

=== Metamaterials ===
Metamaterials are artificial materials engineered to have properties that may not be found in nature. They are created by fabricating an array of structures much smaller than a wavelength. The small (nano) size of the structures is important: That way, light interacts with them as if they made up a uniform, continuous medium, rather than scattering off the individual structures.

== See also ==
- ACS Photonics
- Photonics
- Photonics Spectra journal
- Ultraperformance Nanophotonic Intrachip Communications
