= Nano Letters =

- Discipline: Nanoscience, nanotechnology, materials science, chemistry
- Language: English
- Edited by: Teri W. Odom

Publication details
- History: 2001–present
- Publisher: American Chemical Society (United States)
- Frequency: Monthly
- Open access: Hybrid
- Impact factor: 9.6 (2023)

Standard abbreviations
- ISO 4: Nano Lett.

Indexing
- CODEN: NALEFD
- ISSN: 1530-6984 (print); 1530-6992 (web)
- LCCN: 00215436

Links
- Journal homepage; Online access; Online archive

Nano Letters is a monthly peer-reviewed scientific journal published by the American Chemical Society. It was established in January 2001. The editor-in-chief is Teri W. Odom (Northwestern University). The journal covers all aspects of nanoscience and nanotechnology and their subdisciplines.

== Abstracting and indexing ==
The journal is currently abstracted and indexed in Chemical Abstracts Service, Scopus, EBSCOhost, Index Medicus/MEDLINE/PubMed, Science Citation Index, and Current Contents/Physical, Chemical & Earth Sciences.
