= Junsuk Rho =

South Korean mechanical engineer and academic

- 노준석
- Born: 1981 (age 44–45)
- Education: Seoul National University (BS, 2007); University of Illinois Urbana-Champaign (MS, 2008); University of California, Berkeley (PhD, 2013)
- Known for: Metasurfaces, scalable manufacturing of metalenses
- Awards: Young Scientist Award (2019); NAEK Young Engineer Award (2022); Hong Jin-Ki Creator Award (2022); Highly Cited Researcher (2023, 2024); Fellow of SPIE (2026)
- Scientific career
- Fields: Mechanical engineering, nanophotonics, metamaterials
- Workplaces: Pohang University of Science and Technology
- Doctoral advisor: Xiang Zhang
- Website: photonics.postech.ac.kr

Junsuk Rho (Korean: 노준석; Hanja: 魯埈錫; born 1981) is a South Korean mechanical engineer. He is a professor of mechanical engineering, chemical engineering and electrical engineering at Pohang University of Science and Technology (POSTECH), where he also holds a professorship in the Graduate School of Quantum Science and Technology. He holds the Yeon-San and Mu-Eun-Jae endowed chair professorships.

His research concerns metamaterials and metasurfaces, and methods for mass-producing metalenses and their use in displays. In 2026, he published two papers as the corresponding author in the same April issue of Nature, one being about a roll-to-roll process for mass-producing metalenses and the other being about a display that uses metalenses to switch between 2D and 3D images; it was the first time a Korean researcher had published two different studies as corresponding author in a single issue.

Clarivate named Rho a Highly Cited Researcher in 2023 and 2024, and he became a Fellow of SPIE in 2026. From 29 June to 1 July that year, he was invited as the youngest of 25 leading metamaterials researchers to the Nobel Symposium held at Umeå University in Sweden, where he presented his research on the mass production of metamaterials.

== Early life and education ==
Rho graduated from Myungduk Foreign Language High School in Seoul in 1999, where he majored in English and minored in French and Chinese. He received a BS in mechanical and aerospace engineering from Seoul National University in 2007 and an MS in mechanical science and engineering from the University of Illinois Urbana-Champaign in 2008. He completed a PhD in mechanical engineering at the University of California, Berkeley in 2013 under Xiang Zhang, supported by a Samsung Lee Kun-hee Fellowship from 2008 to 2012.

During his doctoral studies Rho was first author of a 2010 study demonstrating a spherical hyperlens for two-dimensional sub-diffraction imaging at visible frequencies, and he contributed to work on three-dimensional indefinite optical cavities at the nanoscale and on the photonic spin Hall effect at metasurfaces.

== Career ==
After a postdoctoral appointment at Lawrence Berkeley National Laboratory in 2013, Rho was an Argonne Scholar and Ugo Fano Fellow at Argonne National Laboratory from August 2013 to August 2014, where he worked as a principal investigator.

He joined POSTECH in August 2014 as an assistant professor in the departments of mechanical engineering and chemical engineering. He became an associate professor in 2018 and a full professor in 2022, and added an appointment in electrical engineering in 2024. He was appointed Mu-Eun-Jae Endowed Chair Professor in June 2019 and Yeon-San Endowed Chair Professor in December 2024.

Since July 2021 Rho has directed the POSCO-POSTECH-RIST Convergence Research Center for Flat Optics and Metaphotonics. He also directs two centers funded by the National Research Foundation of Korea: a Pioneer Research Center for Smart Optical Security (since 2022) and a Global Research Center for META-Bio-Imaging/Sensing (since 2024). From August 2022 to August 2023 he was a Fulbright Visiting Professor at Northwestern University.

In 2022 he became an associate member of the National Academy of Engineering of Korea in its mechanical engineering division.

Rho was an associate editor and later managing editor of Nanophotonics from 2021 to 2026. He is an editor of Light: Science & Applications and Microsystems & Nanoengineering (since 2021), and an associate editor of npj Nanophotonics (since 2023) and Optics and Photonics Research (since 2025) and Opto-Electronic Plus (since 2025) and Applied Physics Letters (since 2026) and PIER Photonics ( since 2026).

== Research ==
Rho's research concerns metamaterials and metasurfaces, arrays of structures smaller than the wavelength of light that are used to control its phase and polarization. His group develops flat optical components such as lenses, holograms, displays and sensors, together with nanoimprint lithography processes for manufacturing them at scale.

=== Scalable manufacturing of metalenses ===
In 2023 Rho's group reported a method for mass-producing visible-light metasurfaces by coating nanoimprinted polymer structures with a thin high-index film grown by atomic layer deposition. In 2025 the group reported roll-to-plate printed metalenses that focus red, green and blue light to the same point, and applied them to wide-field-of-view holographic near-eye displays. In 2026 he and groups led by Gyoujin Cho and Inki Kim at Sungkyunkwan University reported in Nature a roll-to-roll process that manufactures visible metalenses at 300 units per second.

=== Displays ===
In 2025 Rho and collaborators described a single-layer waveguide display that uses achromatic metagratings to produce full-colour images for augmented reality glasses. In 2026 his group and researchers at Samsung Electronics reported a display that switches between two- and three-dimensional modes using a metasurface lenticular lens.

=== Sensing and other applications ===
In 2024 Rho co-authored work that used metasurfaces designed with machine learning to project structured light across a 360-degree field for three-dimensional sensing. The same year his group reported a water-soluble metasurface label intended to reduce food packaging waste and counterfeiting, and a transparent glass coating that combines a triboelectric nanogenerator with a radiative cooler. In 2026 his group reported a gradient metasurface biosensor that reads resonance shifts directly from a single camera image, detecting proteins and DNA without labels or a spectrometer, and an ultrasonic fingerprint identification scheme in which sound waves are processed by a metasurface-based diffractive neural network, replacing digital postprocessing and template matching.

=== Collaborative work ===
Rho contributed to a 2018 Nature cover study with Ki Tae Nam and colleagues on the amino-acid- and peptide-directed synthesis of chiral plasmonic gold nanoparticles, and to a 2021 Nature study on three-dimensional nanoprinting with charged aerosol jets.

== Recognition ==
According to his laboratory, Rho has authored or co-authored more than 350 journal papers. In June 2026 he was an invited speaker at a Nobel Symposium on metamaterials held at Umeå University in Sweden.

=== Selected honors ===
- Fellow of SPIE (2026)
- Scientist and Engineer of the Month Award, Ministry of Science and ICT (July 2024)
- ACS Nano Lectureship (2024), the first Korean recipient
- Highly Cited Researcher, Clarivate (2023, 2024)
- Hong Jin-ki Creator Award, science and technology category (2022)
- Young Engineer Award, National Academy of Engineering of Korea (2022)
- Haerim Photonics Award, Optical Society of Korea (2021)
- Young Scientist Award, engineering category (2019)
- SPIE Rising Researcher Award (2017)

== See also ==
- Ki Tae Nam
- Superlens
