= NAEK Award =

Engineering and technology award of South Korea

- Country: South Korea
- Presented by: National Academy of Engineering of Korea
- Rewards: KRW 400 million (main award); KRW 100 million (young engineer)
- First award: 1996
- Website: NAEK awards

- NAEK Award
- Hangul: 한국공학한림원 대상
- Hanja: 韓國工學翰林院 大賞
- RR: Hanguk gonghak hallimwon daesang
- MR: Han'guk konghak hallimwŏn taesang

NAEK Young Engineer Award
- Hangul: 한국공학기술상 젊은공학인상
- Hanja: 韓國工學技術賞 젊은工學人賞
- RR: Hanguk gonghak gisulsang jeolmeun gonghaginsang
- MR: Han'guk konghak kisulsang chŏlmŭn konghaginsang

The NAEK Award (Korean: 한국공학한림원 대상) is a lifetime achievement award presented by the National Academy of Engineering of Korea with a cash prize of KRW 400 million from 2025. The NAEK Young Engineer Award (한국공학기술상 젊은공학인상) is presented in conjunction with the NAEK Award and is given to two individuals under the age of 50; one recipient is from industry and the other is from academia. The second award comes with KRW 100 million.

== NAEK Award laureates ==
| Year | Laureate | Affiliation | Citation |
|---|---|---|---|
| 1997 | Choi Hyeong-seop (최형섭) | Federation of Science and Technology Societies | Contributed to the establishment of academic theories, including theory of secondary ferriticism and a new Zr smelting method; and the establishment of Korea Institute of Science and Technology, Daedeok Research Complex, and the Korea Science Foundation. |
| 1997 | Kim Seon-hong (김선홍) | Kia | Contributed greatly to the development of the automobile industry through the development of new products, new technologies, and export of industrial products. |
| 1998 | Lee Man-young (이만영) | Hanyang University | Contributed to the development of the electronics and information industries by writing academic books; disseminating cryptography technology; and developing electronic telephone exchanges, guided missiles, and Korea's first analog electronic calculator. |
| 1998 | Oh Myeong (오명) | The Dong-A Ilbo | Was the organizing committee chairman of Expo '93, and while serving as minister, contributed to the communication revolution and the establishment of an information society through the establishment of various policies and the promotion of projects. |
| 1999 | Lee Bu-seop (이부섭) | Dongjin Chemical Industry | Established Korea's first foaming agent manufacturer, securing a 35% share of the global organic foaming agent market, and contributing to increased exports and the development of domestic precision chemicals through the development of semiconductor encapsulants and semiconductor mold waxes. |
| 2000 | Park Song-bae (박송배) | KAIST | Contributed significantly to the development of industry-academia cooperation by supporting groundbreaking technological advancements in circuit and system design and ultrasound imaging, and the establishment of six venture companies, including Medison Co., Ltd. |
| 2001 | Kim Sang-joo (김상주) | Seoul National University | Introduced advanced subjects for the first time in Korea, establishing a foundation for a graduate-focused university, and making innovative contributions to the research and development of low-alloy structural and functional steel materials. |
| 2002 | Seo Jeong-wook (서정욱) | World Internet Youth Federation | Completed the TDX project, a digital switchboard development project, participated in the development of the world's first CDMA mobile phone, and made a decisive contribution to its commercialization success. |
| 2003 | Lee Jae-seong (이재성) | Seoul National University | A pioneer of chemical engineering education in Korea, he founded and served as president of the Korean Institute of Chemical Engineers. He introduced the concept of "industry-academia cooperation" to Korea, and contributed significantly to the advancement of Korean engineering education. |
| 2004 | Yeo Jong-gi (여종기) | LG Chem Technology Research Center | Contributed to the development of the domestic chemical industry through numerous research achievements, including engineering plastics. |
| 2005 | Lee Jae-young (이재영) | KAIST | Contributed to a study on hydrogen embrittlement of steel using hydrogen thermal analysis |
| 2006 | Park Seung-deok (박승덕) | Korea Institute of Machinery and Materials | As the director of the Research and Development Coordination Office of the Ministry of Science and ICT, he laid the foundation for the domestic semiconductor industry by planning and supporting the 4MD RAM prototype development project. He contributed significantly to improving the Korea Research Institute of Standards and Science. |
| 2007 | Lee Jong-hoon (이종훈) | Korea Electric Power Corporation | Achieving self-reliance in nuclear power plant construction technology, establishing a bridgehead for overseas expansion in the electric power sector, selected as one of the "60 Outstanding Engineers who Built Korea," and on behalf of KEPCO, he received the Edison Award (Edison Electric Institute) which was the first time the award was bestowed in Asia. |
| 2008 | Jeong Seok-gyu (정석규) | Shinyang Cultural Foundation | Pioneered the domestic rubber industry. Developing and supplying functional rubber parts for key industries including electronics and automobiles. Contributed to a culture of giving (KRW 20 billion in scholarships and donations). |
| 2009 | Lee Hyeon-sun (이현순) | Hyundai Motor Company | Development of the Alpha Engine, Korea's first independent model. Development of high-performance engines, including the Theta World Engine and export of engine design technology. Contribution to improving the design and development capabilities of domestic small and medium-sized enterprises. Establishment of the world's first automotive environmental technology research center. |
| 2010 | Go Hong-sik (고홍식) | Samsung Total Senior Advisor | After the foreign exchange crisis, Samsung General Chemicals was revived from bankruptcy and developed into a world-class company. Through field-oriented TPM and Six Sigma activities, a zero-accident, world-class energy-efficient petrochemical plant was realized. By integrating chemical industry-related organizations and launching the Korea Federation of Chemical Industries, a firm position in the global chemical industry was established, contributing to the sustainable development and internationalization of the Korean chemical industry. |
| 2011 | Oh Won-cheol (오원철) | Former Senior Economic Affairs Secretary to the President | In the 1970s, he restructured the industrial structure to focus on heavy and chemical industries, leading Korea's industrialization and rapid growth. To overcome the crisis following the 1973 oil crisis, he entered the Middle Eastern construction market and fostered the plant engineering industry. He contributed to the reform of the science and technology education system to train technicians, technicians, engineers, and scientists, the establishment of various research institutes, and the construction of the Daedeok Research Complex. |
| 2012 | Kang Chang-oh (강창오) | POSTECH | Development of the next-generation innovative steelmaking process, FINEX process technology. Development of the next-generation innovative hot-rolled steel plate manufacturing process. |
| 2013 | Kim Jong-hoon (김종훈) | Hanmi Global | In the mid-1990s, he introduced an advanced construction management technique to Korea. As the first generation of high-rise building experts in Korea, he contributed to the practical application of high-rise construction technology by carrying out more than 70% of high-rise building projects in Korea and training approximately 200 experts. He established the Construction Industry Vision Forum to seek innovation in the construction industry. And as the chairman of the Construction Industry Advancement Committee, he established 'Construction Advancement 2020,' the future vision for Korean construction. |
| 2014 | Yoon Bu-geun (윤부근) | Samsung Electronics | Played a pivotal role in making Samsung the top seller of TVs globally. Continued to develop display products, including Full HD LED TV, 3D TV, and SMART TV. Expanding domestic and international design research centers and continuing design innovation. |
| 2015 | Byun Dae-gyu (변대규) | Humax Holdings | Founded the venture company Humax in 1989 and over 21 years, grew it have annual sales of KRW 1 trillion, which resulted in over KRW 800 billion in foreign currency annually. Developed the first set-top box for digital satellite broadcasting reception in Asia and third globally. Received the Gold Tower Order of Industrial Service Merit, selected as one of the "60 Outstanding Engineers who Built Korea" and as a next generation leader in Asia. |
| 2016 | Kim Yun-geun (김윤근) | Iljin Electric Co. | By applying university laborator research results electrolytic copper foil to industry, he contributed to Korea's leap forward as an electronics powerhouse. He developed the world's thinnest and highest-performing electrolytic copper foil for lithium-ion secondary batteries. He domestically produced the "aluminum alloy bobbin," a synthetic fiber spool that had been entirely dependent on imports. |
| 2017 | Park Jin-soo (businessman) (박진수) | LG Chem | Contributed to Korea's development and commercialization of lithium-ion secondary batteries. Successfully developed and commercialized automotive lithium-ion secondary batteries for the first time in Korea, achieving global leadership in the mid- to large-sized secondary battery market. Laying the foundation for a "small nation on the island, technological powerhouse" through increased R&D investment. Enhanced international competitiveness through fostering an autonomous and creative R&D culture. |
| 2018 | Kim Ki-nam (businessman) (김기남) | Samsung Electronics | Substantial improvements to semiconductor technology. Developed the world's first 20nm and 10nm class DRAM products, and is leading the development of new application design technology that compensates for low-capacity capacitors and new technologies for high-speed, low-power devices. |
| 2019 | Lee Sang-yup (이상엽) | KAIST | By pioneering systems metabolic engineering and developing numerous core technologies and world-first bioprocesses, he have significantly contributed to the advancement of the global biochemical industry, thereby elevating Korea's status globally. Using systems metabolic engineering, he have developed and transferred to industry numerous microorganisms and production processes for gasoline, engineering plastic raw materials, spider silk proteins stronger than steel, biodegradable and biocompatible non-natural plastics, and aromatic polyesters, all for the first time. |
| 2020 | Jo Seong-jin (조성진) | LG Electronics | Improvements in home appliance industry technologies, including domestic production of washing machines (1987), development of the first washing machine Direct Drive System (1998), the first dual steam drum washing machine (2005), and turbo wash (2013). Increased efficiency in R&D and production methods through modular design of home appliances. Leading the market by launching new brands, including LG Signature and Signature Kitchen Suite. Focusing on strengthening future capabilities through preemptive investment in robots, artificial intelligence, autonomous driving, and big data, and the formation of dedicated organizations such as the Robot Business Center. |
| 2021 | Seo Jung-jin (서정진) | Celltrion | The world's first antibody biosimilar, Remsima, has received regulatory approval from the US (FDA) and Europe (EMA). Development and production of second-generation antibody biosimilar. Development of Remsima SC, the first subcutaneous infliximab formulation. Related patent applications were filed in approximately 130 countries. |
| 2022 | Hyeon Taeghwan (현택환) | Seoul National University | The first temperature-assisted method for mass-synthesizing uniform nanoparticles without size separation was developed and is now a standard nanoparticle synthesis method. Development of a number of low-cost, high-efficiency, eco-friendly catalysts necessary for innovation in energy storage and conversion processes. Suggestion of potential applications of nanomaterials as MRI contrast agents and therapeutic antioxidants. |
| 2023 | Han Jong-hee (한종희) | Samsung Electronics | Development of core technologies for B2C and B2B display products and leading in image technology. Contributed to the development of the domestic display industry through industry-academic cooperation with domestic universities, including technologies related to MicroLED, image quality, and QLED materials. |
| 2024 | Park Nam-Gyu (박남규) | Sungkyunkwan University | Development of a stable and highly efficient solid-state perovskite solar cell using a light-absorbing material with a perovskite structure; a significant development to perovskite photovoltaics and transformation of the domestic solar cell industry. |
| 2025 | Cha Gi-cheol (차기철) | InBody | Development of 'Inbody', a body composition analyzer with simultaneous direct measurement and multi-frequency measurement technology for each body part. Establishment of 13 local corporations around the world, export of products and services to 110 countries, and significant contribution the exports market. |

== NAEK Young Engineer Award laureates ==
| Year | Laureate | Affiliation | Citation |
|---|---|---|---|
| 1997 | Chin Dae-je (진대제) | Samsung Electronics | Contributed to the advancement of semiconductor technology, including the development of 4M and 16M DRAMs, Korea's first 64M, and the world's first 256M DRAM. |
| 1998 | Lee Min-hwa (이민화) | Samsung Medison | Contributing to the national economy by developing and importing high-quality ultrasound diagnostic equipment, and contributing to the revitalization of domestic venture companies as the president of the Venture Business Association. |
| 1999 | Ahn Young-kyung (안영경) | Handysoft | After founding a venture company, he developed the groupware product Handysoft and distributed it to over 300 public institutions at home and abroad, contributing to national informatization. |
| 2000 | Choi Seung-bok (최승복) | Inha University | Their research on smart structures and system control contributed significantly to improving related domestic technology and replacing existing control systems. |
| 2000 | Ahn Cheol-soo (안철수) | AhnLab | The company provides free anti-virus programs to eradicate computer viruses which has contributed significantly to the revitalization of the domestic software market. |
| 2001 | Kim Do-yeon (researcher) (김도연) | Seoul National University | Contributed significantly to the advancement of materials engineering through material microstructure research and applied the research results through the establishment of a venture company. |
| 2001 | Park Wan-cheol (박완철) | Korea Institute of Science and Technology | Developed new technologies and methods for livestock wastewater treatment which will contribute to import substitution and increased exports. Approximately 15,000 high-efficiency wastewater treatment facilities will be installed in residential homes. |
| 2002 | Lee Tae-sik (이태식) | Hanyang University | Established a knowledge management system (KMS, PMIS) for construction management and a research network (VERN) for information management in construction projects. |
| 2002 | Byun Dae-gyu (변대규) | Humax | Developed a leading company with the largest market share in digital satellite broadcast receivers (set-top boxes), and was selected as a leader in Asia by Newsweek. |
| 2003 | Kim Nak-jun (김낙준) | POSTECH | Developed a lightweight, high-strength, and ductile alloy for environmental conservation and energy conservation. He also developed the first continuous plate manufacturing technology for amorphos alloy and conducted a technology transfer overseas. |
| 2003 | Lee Dae-seong (이대성) | Korea Aerospace Research Institute | Contributed significantly to establishing the foundation for domestic independent development of gas turbines and made a decisive contribution to the successful launch of scientific rockets. |
| 2004 | Kwon Oh-kyung (권오경) | Hanyang University | Contributed to the development of flat panel displays and driving technology. |
| 2004 | Lee Kunwoo (이건우) | Seoul National University | As a domestic leader in CAD, he founded the CAD/CAM Society and contributed to the training of key personnel. |
| 2005 | Lee Sang-yeop (이상엽) | KAIST | A global leader in biotechnology through metabolic engineering research and published Korea's first organism genome paper in Nature. |
| 2005 | Kim Ki-hwan (김기환) | Korea Railroad Research Institute | The director of Korean High-Speed Rail Technology Development. |
| 2006 | Hong Guk-seon (홍국선) | Seoul National University | Development of a new material related to dielectric ceramic materials for low-temperature homogeneous firing without adding glass. Active industry-academia cooperation through the establishment of the University Industrial Technology Support Group. |
| 2006 | Park Hee-jae (박희재) | S&U Freedom | Developed TFT-LCD nano-measurement technology and securing the largest market share in the field. Established a university laboratory and listing on KOSDAQ. |
| 2007 | Jeong Deok-gyun (정덕균) | Seoul National University | Development and commercialization of an oversampled data recovery circuit using a multi-phase clock. Proposal of an international standard for DVI and co-founding of Silicon Image and its listing on NASDAQ. |
| 2007 | Park Sang-il (박상일) | Park Systems | Development of the XE-Series atomic force microscope. Startup and success of venture companies in Korea and the US. |
| 2008 | Cha Guk-heon (차국헌) | Seoul National University | Design and development of low-k materials for semiconductors with excellent physical properties. Establishment of a method for analyzing the pores and nanostructure of polymer thin films using neutron and X-ray scattering. Establishment of a venture company to secure basic technology for producing polymer thin films. |
| 2009 | Park Jae-geun (박재근) | Hanyang University | Development of the first amorphous silicon wafer. Development of the first super silicon wafer. Successful domestic production of "CMP slurry" for semiconductors. |
| 2009 | Kim Tae-song (김태송) | Korea Institute of Science and Technology | Developed and exported the second capsule-type endoscope. Development of piezoelectric thin-film/thick-film driven resonant MEMS devices. Development of MEMS devices for micro-blood diagnosis/analysis. |
| 2010 | Min Sang-ryeol (민상렬) | Seoul National University | Established the foundation for system software technology mounted on flash memory. Developed and commercialized the fastest solid state disk and the first hybrid hard disk that combines the advantages of flash memory and hard disks. |
| 2010 | Yang Jun-ho (양준호) | Korea Aerospace Industries | Developed the KAI T-50 Golden Eagle supersonic advanced trainer aircraft, the first in Korea and the 12th in the world. Developed KAI KUH-1 Surion; South Korea's first utility helicopter. Established the first integrated fixed-wing/rotary-wing 3D digital design and development infrastructure. |
| 2011 | Han Jong-hoon (한종훈) | Seoul National University | Developed and transferred process optimization technology in multiple fields. Lead the establishment of the Korea Carbon Capture and Storage Association (KCCS). |
| 2011 | Ji Yo-han (지요한) | Hyundai Motor Company | Developed the first passenger diesel engine in Korea using proprietary technology and installed it in passenger cars. Captured over 50% of the diesel passenger car market in Western Europe by developing a diesel engine with superior performance compared to competitors. Developed the first diesel engine in Korea to meet Euro 4 and 5 emission regulations. |
| 2012 | Mun Su-bok (문수복) | KAIST | Developed a 40-gigabit software router utilizing general-purpose PC-based GPUs. |
| 2012 | Jang Jun-geun (장준근) | NanoenTek | Independently developed bio-MEMS-based lab-on-a-chip technology and successfully commercialized the startup. 84 patents were registered developing the lab-on-a-chip platform technology. Contributed to the establishment of national policies for nano-bio convergence. |
| 2013 | Jung Woo-sik (정우식) | Korea Atomic Energy Research Institute | Developed FORTE and FTREX, software that quantifies and analyzes the risk of nuclear power plants, and exported them overseas. He developed VIPEX, software that identifies key areas essential for the physical protection of nuclear power plants, and donated it to the International Atomic Energy Agency. Domestically, it is planned to be used to identify key areas of nuclear power plants in operation in Korea. |
| 2013 | Lee In-gyu (이인규) | Korea University | Conducted leading research on multi-antenna techniques and published over 80 papers in SCI international journals and over 100 papers in international conferences which have been cited over 2,000 times. Multi-antenna based Bit Interleaved Coded Modulation method was applied as a basic structure of 4th generation LTE telecommunications and WiBro. |
| 2014 | Seok Hyeon-gwang (석현광) | Korea Institute of Science and Technology | Developed the first low-decomposition/high-strength biodegradable metal composed of bone components. Developed technology to manufacture thick-film nanocoatings with the same quality as thin films at high production speeds, and transferred the technology to small and medium-sized enterprises. Increased annual sales by five times in two years of commercialization. |
| 2014 | Kim Yong-hwan (김용환) | Seoul National University | Contributed to reducing research service costs and preventing the outflow of domestic design drawings overseas. He fostered specialized personnel in the shipbuilding and marine field and contributed to enhancing national technological competitiveness. |
| 2015 | Lee Jong-ho (이종호) | Seoul National University | Invented the first 3D semiconductor device, Bulk FinFET, and secured domestic and international patents. Granted a non-exclusive license to the leading semiconductor company that mass-produces CPUs, resulting in the highest royalty income among those working at public institutions. |
| 2015 | Kim Byeong-gu (김병구) | LG Display | Developed high-resolution LCD products based on AH-IPS to achieve standardization and contribute to the growth of the mobile LCD market. Developed various display products that meet market demands, such as LCD panels equipped with Touch Solutions and glasses-free 3D technology. |
| 2016 | Lee Jae-seok (이재석) | cafe24 | Cafe24, an e-commerce platform, allows users to create their own online shopping mall. The company is driving e-commerce by establishing over 930,000 domestic online shopping malls and over 50,000 overseas. |
| 2016 | Sim Sang-jun (심상준) | Korea University | Development of a core process technology that converts carbon dioxide, a cause of global warming, into a high-value-added useful substance called astaxanthin through photosynthesis. Over 150 SCI academic papers were published through R&D on the early diagnosis of intractable diseases and the kinetic elucidation of life phenomena, such as protein synthesis processes, centered on single nanoparticles. |
| 2017 | Kang Byeong-yeong (강병영) | Amorepacific Corporation | Developed ginseng cosmetics through the development of ginsenoside, a ginseng-derived ingredient with excellent anti-aging properties, and developing formulation technology to effectively deliver it to the skin, generated KRW 240 billion in sales in 2015. Localizing the stabilization capsule technology for retinol, a leading anti-aging ingredient, improved profitability through cost reduction. Selected as a world-class product for masks/packs and sunscreens in 2014 and 2015. |
| 2017 | Son Hoon (손훈) | KAIST | Development of structural health monitoring and also nondestructive testing technologies. He developed an advanced smart sensor, monitoring system, and nondestructive technology capable of real-time, automatic detection of micro-damage in various structures. Application and commercialization of research results were carried out in 18 industry-academic projects worth over KRW 1.6 billion. |
| 2018 | Sim Tae-bo (심태보) | KIST Chemical Kinomics Research Center | Conducted technology transfers of drug candidates. The technology transfer resulted in development of a new inhibitor (FLT3-IN-1/acute myeloid leukemia AML targeted treatment candidate) that strongly inhibits the FLT3 triple mutant (drug resistance inducer). Contributed to drug discovery and development by securing a large number of intellectual property rights with the goal of creating new drugs. |
| 2018 | Kwon Sunghoon (권성훈) | Seoul National University | Lead academic research for personalized medical diagnosis and pharmaceutical technology using biochips and functional particles. Development and commercialization of ultra-fast antibiotic susceptibility testing technology for emergency sepsis patients. Development and commercialization of technology for capturing and sequencing cancer genes using DNA laser printing technology. |
| 2019 | Kim Jong-hee (김종희) | POSCO | Development and commercialization of the first super ferritic stainless steel (Poss470FC) with high corrosion resistance and high conductivity for use as a metal separator for hydrogen electric vehicles and home proton-exchange membrane fuel cells and core manufacturing process technology. Developed precision molding technology for automobile companies and home fuel cell companies. Participated in joint cooperation with the Hyundai Nexo. |
| 2019 | Chae Chan-byoung (채찬병) | Yonsei University | Lead development of core technology research for "molecular communication systems." Served as Editor-in-chief of IEEE Transactions on Molecular, Biological and Multi-Scale Communications. Development of core technologies for 5G communication elements (full duplex, millimeter wave, etc.) and real-time demonstrations. Published over 70 SCI papers, with over 7,000 total citations, and won multiple awards from the Institute of Electrical and Electronics Engineers. |
| 2020 | Park Gwang-il (박광일) | Samsung Electronics | Contributed to the development of next-generation DRAM technologies, including the first, second and third generation 10nm class, and established a timely mass production system. 2018 DRAM sales exceeded $40 billion, surpassing Intel in memory sales in the first half of 2018, contributing to strengthening the status of the ultra-gap memory business. |
| 2020 | Kang Ki-seok (강기석) | Seoul National University | Through a quantum computing-based new electrode design method, he developed a source electrode material for secondary batteries. Developed a new concept for high-performance electrodes that overcome the limitations of existing lithium secondary battery cathode materials, sodium battery electrodes, and lithium-air electrodes. Developed the first artificial metabolic battery that mimics biological metabolism. Developed next-generation lithium battery element technology. |
| 2021 | Jeong Dae-yeol (정대열) | HD Hyundai Heavy Industries | As a development engineer for Himsen Engine, the only independently developed engine in Korea, he has developed 4 types of diesel engines, 1 type of gas engine, and 5 types of dual-fuel engines. He helped cement the competitiveness of the domestic shipbuilding industry, and also contributed to the revitalization of the domestic parts industry through localization of parts. Through his efforts, domestic dual-fuel engine output and efficiency matched that of European engine makers. He applied for numerous patents (37 domestic, 2 overseas) and has created a paper (H35/40G engine development) with CIMAC. |
| 2021 | Han Seung-yong (한승용) | Seoul National University | Developed the first non-insulated high-temperature superconducting magnet (no-insulation HTS magnet) technology, securing a patent and achieving commercialization of high-temperature superconducting magnets. First commercial sale of high-temperature superconducting magnets and first application to industrial equipment using domestic technology. His paper on non-insulated high-temperature superconducting magnets was the most cited paper of 2016 as noted by Superconductor Science and Technology. Achieved a world record for DC magnetic field and was lead author in a paper published in Nature. Selected as one of the "Top 10 Breakthroughs 2019" by Physics World. |
| 2022 | Kim Ik-jae (김익재) | Korea Institute of Science and Technology | Advanced technology in the field of scientific security by developing the first AI-based age-conversion 3D montage and facial recognition technology and secured key patents. Contributed to the localization of digital actor technology through the development and transfer of photo-based high-definition modeling technology. |
| 2022 | Noh Jun-seok (노준석) | POSTECH | Introduced innovative design techniques by introducing artificial intelligence in the fields of nanostructures and nano-optics in Korea. Lead research in next-generation displays and ultra-thin flat panel science based on metamaterials. |
| 2023 | Kim Hyung-soo (김형수) | SK Hynix | Development and launch of the first DDR5 DRAM (1ynm-class 16Gb). Contributed to the development of the Korean semiconductor industry by securing technological capabilities, including development and mass production of the highest-performance HBM3. |
| 2023 | Jang Jun-hyuk (장준혁) | Hanyang University | Independent development of Korean speech recognition technology based on AI deep learning technology. Commercialization of Samsung Electronics' Bixby, LG Electronics' Think Q, and SK Telecom's NuGU, and independent development of AI speaker Pluto at Hanyang University. |
| 2024 | Ha Jung-woo (하정우) | Naver Corporation | HyperCLOVA, the third AI with over 100 billion parameters, is the first Korean language AI developed in Korea. CLOVA Studio was developed and released to enable easy use of HyperCLOVA in API form by external companies, schools and individuals. |
| 2024 | Choi Jang-wook (최장욱) | Seoul National University | Advancements in several fields, including molecular pulleys and polymer binders for high-capacity secondary batteries. As the director of the Hyundai Motor Company-Seoul National University Joint Battery Research Center, developed new models of industry-academia cooperation, including creating various industry-academia cooperation projects and establishing joint startups. |
| 2025 | Oh Hyeong-seok (오형석) | KIST Clean Energy Research Center | Development of foundational technologies and systems for mass production of high-value-added compounds through electrochemical CO2 conversion and technology transfers to LG Chem worth KRW 1.17 billion. Contributed to the advancement of basic and original research by developing various real-time analysis platforms such as Operando. |
| 2025 | Hong Won-bin (홍원빈) | POSTECH | Contributed to the development and commercialization of core technologies for 5G terminal antennas. Transferring 5G technology, establishing Korea's first 5G antenna startup, and attracting over KRW 9 billion in investment. |

== See also ==
- National Academy of Sciences Award
- Korea Engineering Award
