= Irudayaraj =

Irudayaraj or Iruthayaraj (Tamil: இருதயராஜ்) is a Tamil Christian surname and masculine given name meaning Sacred Heart. It is most commonly found in Tamil Nadu state in South India. Notable people with the name include:

- Inigo S. Irudayaraj (fl. 2020s), Indian politician
- Joseph Irudayaraj (born 1961), American engineer and chemist
- Joseph Anthony Irudayaraj (1935–2019), former bishop of the Roman Catholic Diocese of Dharmapuri, India
- Savarinathen Iruthayaraj (1927–2001), former Bishop of the Roman Catholic Diocese of Palayamkottai, India
