= Nikolay Zheludev =

British scientist

Nikolay Zheludev FRS
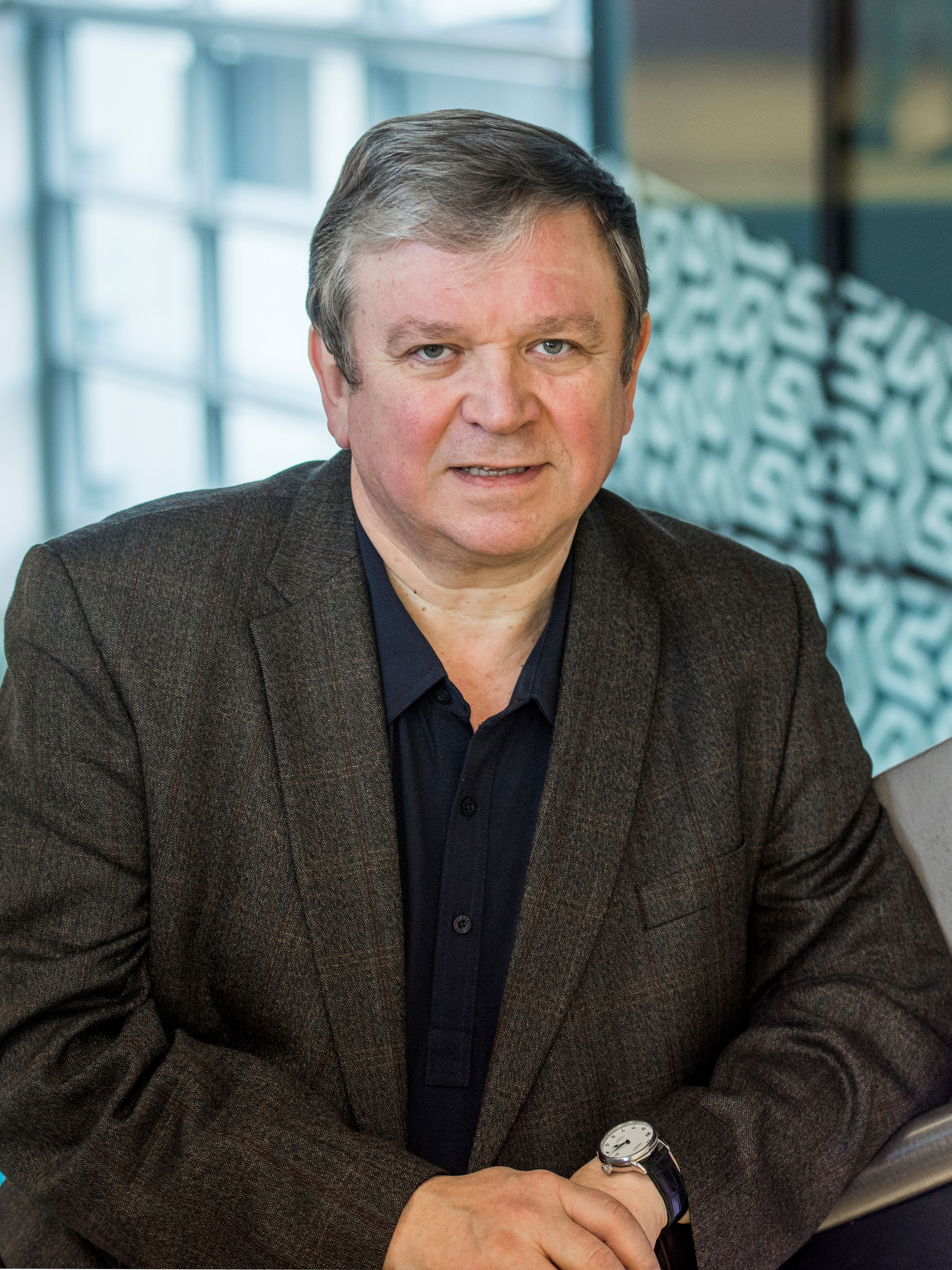
- Born: Nikolay I. Zheludev; April 23, 1955 (age 71); Moscow, Russia
- Education: Moscow State University
- Spouse: Tanya Nousinova
- Children: Ilya Ivan
- Awards: Young Medal and Prize (2015); President's Science and Technology Award (2020); Michael Faraday Medal and Prize (2022)
- Scientific career
- Fields: Nanophotonics; Metamaterials; Nonlinear Optics
- Workplaces: University of Southampton; Nanyang Technological University; Moscow State University
- Doctoral advisors: A. I. Kovrigin (PhD 1981); S. A. Akhmanov (DSc 1992)
- Website: www.nanophotonics.org.uk www.nanophotonics.sg

Nikolay Ivanovich Zheludev FRS NAE (born 23 April 1955) is a Professor of Physics and Deputy Director of the Optoelectronics Research Centre at the University of Southampton, UK. Concurrently with his appointment at the University of Southampton, he has held the post of President’s Professor of Physics at the Nanyang Technological University Singapore from 2012 to 2024. He is a Hagler Fellow, Hagler Institute for Advanced Study, Texas A&M University, USA and a Distinguished Fellow, Institute of Advanced Studies, Nanyang Technological University, Singapore. He is a fellow of the Institute of Physics, American Physical Society, European Physical Society and Optica. He was elected a fellow of the Royal Society in 2018 and a Member of the US National Academy of Engineering in 2019.

== Career and research ==
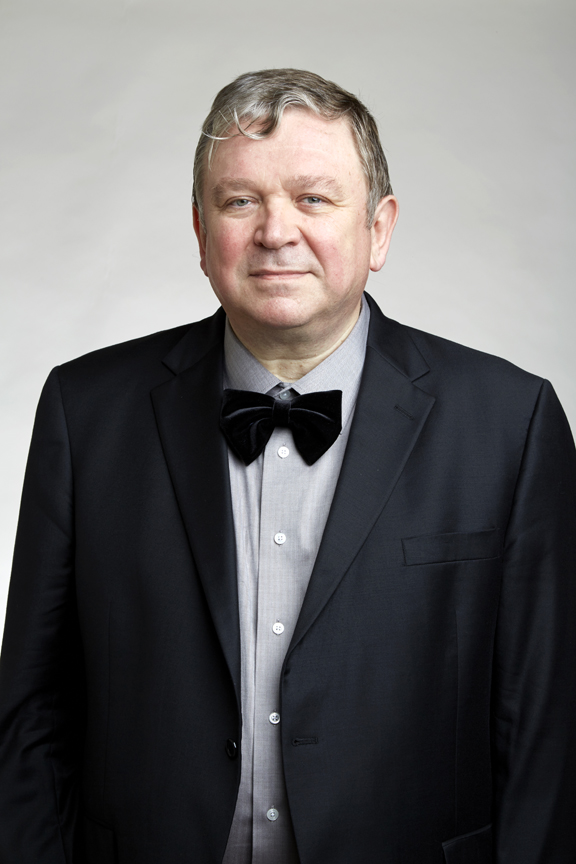
Nikolay Zheludev at the Royal Society admissions day in London, July 2018

Nikolay Zheludev is one of the founding members of the closely interlinked fields of metamaterials and nanophotonics that emerged at the dawn of the 21st century at the crossroads of optics and nanotechnology.

Nikolay Zheludev started his academic career at the Lomonosov Moscow State University, where he obtained MSc (1978), PhD (1981) and DSc (1992). He moved to the UK in 1991, taking a lecturer position at the University of Southampton, where in 2007 he became Deputy Director of the Optoelectronics Research Centre, one of the world's leading institutes for photonics research and the largest photonics group in the UK. Concurrently with his post at the University of Southampton in 2012 he founded and directed the Centre for Disruptive Photonic Technologies at Nanyang Technological University, which he directed from 2012 to 2024. Since 2014 he has been the founding co-director of The Photonics Institute, Asia's leading photonics research organisation at Nanyang Technological University, Singapore.

As a principal investigator, Zheludev has led research programmes in the UK and Singapore with total PI funding exceeding £60M. His funding profile includes major research programmes funded by UK EPSRC, European Research Council, Ministry of Education and A*STAR Singapore, DARPA and Office of Naval Research in the USA.

He is known for his works on photonic and microwave metamaterials, plasmonics, toroidal electrodynamics, optical superoscillations, and optical metrology.

This includes pioneering observations of asymmetric transmission of light, electromagnetically induced transparency in metamaterials, optical manifestations of two-dimensional chirality, Fano resonances and sharp closed modes, negative index due to chirality, optical activity without chirality and realization of classical continuous time crystal.

In the field of toroidal electrodynamics he provided the first observation of the fundamental electromagnetic toroidal moment electromagnetic anapole and toroidal light pulses, propagating counterparts of localized toroidal excitations and predicted the exitance of toroidal transitions in atoms.

Zheludev observed the fundamental optical effect of superoscillations of light that allows the focusing of light into sub-diffraction hotspots and mapped topological and structural properties of superoscillatory light. He developed a new super-resolution imaging paradigm based on the super-oscillation of light and topological optical metrology for macroscopic and nanoscopic objects with resolution reaching a fraction of the atomic diameter.

He is a pioneer of “metamaterials with optical properties on demand”. He pioneered reconfigurable nano-opto-mechanical nanostructured matter, controlled its optical properties with temperature, electric, magnetic, sound and optical signals, through nanomechanical actuation. He developed ground-breaking techniques for mapping movements in reconfigurable matter with atomic-scale resolution and reported observation of ballistic thermal motion in nanostructures. He coined the term “metadevice” where device functionality is achieved by the structuring of the material, pioneered hybrid metamaterials with superconductors, carbon nanotubes, graphene, chalcogenides, topological insulators, perovskites, and liquid mercury microfluidics. He developed controlling light with light in coherent quantum metadevices.

Zheludev was one of the first who recognised the potential of phase-change phenomena for nanophotonics, with nanoparticles and metamaterials and developed phase change reconfigurable photonic metadevices. He coined the term “active plasmonics”, and reported femtosecond switching of surface plasmons.

He demonstrated the generation of plasmon-polaritons by free-electron impact and laid the foundations of the plasmonic-enabled metamaterial laser, “Lasing Spaser”. He developed a free-electron-driven nanophotonic holographic light source and free-electron driven “light well” and metamaterial light sources on a chip.

He served as the editor-in-chief of the Journal of Optics from 2010 until 2020, and he is currently an Advisory Board Member for Nanophotonics and ACS Photonics. In 2007, he established the European Physical Society international biennial meeting for nanophotonics and metamaterials, the NANOMETA conference.

=== Awards and honours ===
Zheludev was awarded the Thomas Young Medal and Prize in 2015 for “Global Leadership and Pioneering, Seminal Work in Optical Metamaterials and Nanophotonics”. In 2022, he was awarded the Michael Faraday Medal and Prize for ""For international leadership, discoveries and in-depth studies of new phenomena and functionalities in photonic nanostructures and nanostructured matter". In 2020, he was awarded the President's Science and Technology Award, the highest honours bestowed on research scientists in Singapore. Zheludev has also been awarded the Leverhulme Trust Senior Research Fellowship (2000); Senior Research Professorship of the EPSRC (2002); and The Royal Society Wolfson Research Merit Award & Fellowship (2009). He is a Fellow of the European Physical Society (EPS), The Optical Society (OSA), The Institute of Physics (IOP) and the American Physical Society (APS).

In 2018, he was elected as a Fellow of the Royal Society, a fellowship of many of the world's most eminent scientists and the oldest scientific academy in continuous existence. In 2019, he was elected as a foreign member of the United States of America National Academy of Engineering. In 2021, he became a laureate of the Asian Scientist 100 by the Asian Scientist.

== Personal life ==
Nikolay was born in Moscow, Russia. His father physicist and crystallographer Prof. Ivan S. Zheludev worked at the Institute of Crystallography Russian Academy of Sciences, Moscow, Russia and combined his academic work with the post of the Deputy Director General of International Atomic Energy Agency, Austria, Vienna. His mother Dr. Galina Zheludeva was a faculty at Moscow State University. Nikolay's sister, Prof. Svetlana Zheludeva worked at the Russian Academy of Sciences and his brother Andrey is professor at ETH Zurich. Nikolay is married to linguist Tanya Nousinova, daughter of playwright Ilya Nousinov. They have two sons, Ilya and Ivan.
