= Chin Dae-je =

South Korean businessman (born 1952)

- Hangul: 진대제
- Hanja: 陳大濟
- RR: Jin Daeje
- MR: Chin Taeje

Chin Dae-je (Korean: 진대제; born January 20, 1952) is a South-Korean businessman and former politician.

== Biography ==
He was born on January 20, 1952, in Uiryeong, South Gyeongsang Province.

He attended Gyeonggi High School and then studied Electrical Engineering at Seoul National University (B.S. and M.S.), the University of Massachusetts Amherst (M.S.) and Stanford (Ph.D.). From 1985 he worked for Samsung, and served as president of their Digital Media Business from 2000 to 2003.

He became Minister of Information and Communication in February, 2003.

He resigned from the government in early 2006, and ran for the governorship of Gyeonggi Province on the ruling Uri Party ticket. However he lost to Kim Moon-soo, the candidate of Grand National Party, as part of the widespread electoral revolt against the incumbent ruling party. He was however the only candidate to collect more than 30% of the votes by a ruling Uri-party candidate in all of the contests in the whole nation, except Governor Kim Wan-ju of North Jeolla Province.

He gave a plenary talk at International Solid State Circuit Conference (ISSCC), 2005.

== Awards and honors ==
In 1997, he became a recipient of the NAEK Award by the National Academy of Engineering of Korea. Chin was elected a member of the National Academy of Engineering in 2020 for innovations and industry leadership in semiconductor technology. In the same year, became a laureate of the Asian Scientist 100 by the Asian Scientist.
