= Ki Tae Nam =

South Korean material scientist

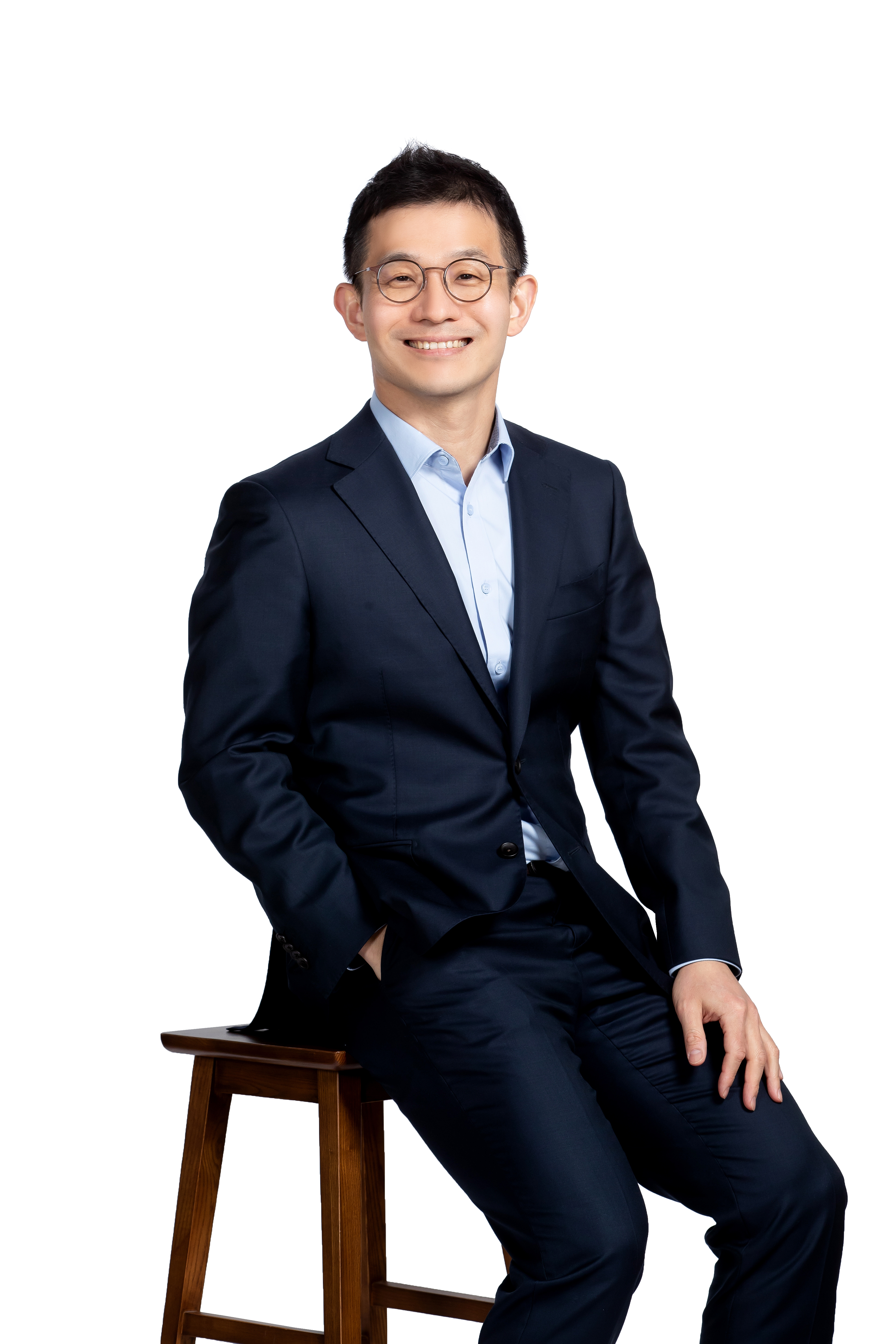
- Education: Seoul National University (B.S, M.S); Massachusetts Institute of Technology (Ph.D)
- Known for: electrochemical CO₂ utilization
- Awards: POSCO TJ Park Prize (2022); Presidential Young Scientist Award (2018)
- Scientific career
- Fields: Materials science
- Workplaces: Seoul National University; Lawrence Berkeley National Laboratory
- Thesis: Multifunctional Virus Scaffolds for Energy Applications: Nanomaterials Synthesis and Two Dimensional Assembly (2007)
- Doctoral advisor: Angela Belcher

Korean name
- Hangul: 남기태
- RR: Nam Gitae
- MR: Nam Kit'ae

Ki Tae Nam (Korean: 남기태) is a South Korean materials scientist, engineer, and professor in the Department of Materials Science and Engineering at Seoul National University (SNU). He is known for his research in bioinspired materials, chiral nanomaterials, and electrochemical CO₂ utilization. He received the POSCO TJ Park Prize and Presidential Young Scientist Award

== Early life and education ==
Nam earned his B.S. and M.S. degrees in Materials Science and Engineering from Seoul National University. He received his Ph.D. in the same field from the Massachusetts Institute of Technology (MIT), where he was awarded the Outstanding PhD Thesis Award in 2007 for his dissertation on virus-based electrochemical devices, including the first virus-based lithium-ion battery.

== Career ==
Following his doctorate, Nam conducted postdoctoral research at Lawrence Berkeley National Laboratory's Molecular Foundry from 2007 to 2010. There, under Ron Zuckermann's guidance, he developed sequence-specific peptoid nanosheets—a breakthrough in peptide-mimetic materials published in Nature Materials.

In 2010, he joined SNU's faculty. His work has since spanned bioinspired synthesis of chiral plasmonic nanomaterials, electrochemical CO₂ conversion, and advanced optoelectronic applications.

Nam also contributes to national science and technology policy. In 2022 and 2023, he served on South Korea's Presidential Advisory Council on Science and Technology, among other strategic roles.

== Research ==
Nam's research spans several interconnected areas within bioinspired nanomaterials, chiral plasmonics, and electrochemical CO₂ utilization. In the field of bioinspired nanomaterials and energy applications, he co-authored a 2006 Science paper reporting the first battery built using genetically engineered viruses to assemble oxide nanowires for lithium-ion electrodes. In 2010, as a postdoctoral researcher, he advanced peptide-mimetic two-dimensional materials through the development of free-floating peptoid nanosheets, published in Nature Materials.

His contributions to chiral nanomaterials include a 2018 Nature study demonstrating amino-acid-directed synthesis of plasmonic gold nanoparticles with tailored chiral optical properties.

In 2022, he developed chiral sensors based on collective circular dichroism for enantioselective molecular detection, followed in 2024 by a Nature Materials publication elucidating the mechanistic pathways of chiral nanoparticle formation using generative approaches.

In electrochemical CO₂ utilization, Nam achieved the first electrochemical synthesis of dimethyl carbonate directly from CO₂ in a 2021 Nature Energy paper, and in 2024 reported the electrochemically initiated conversion of CO₂ into ethylene carbonate in Nature Synthesis. He has also advanced methods for CO₂ capture and conversion, including paired electrosynthesis and catalyst development, reinforcing his leadership in applied CO₂ electrochemistry.

== Awards ==
- Outstanding PhD Thesis Award, MIT (2007)
- Presidential Young Scientist Award (2018)
- Shinyang Engineering Academy Award (2021)
- POSCO TJ Park Prize (2022)

== Selected publications ==
- Nam, Ki Tae; Kim, Dong-Wan; Yoo, Pil J.; Chiang, Chung-Yi; Meethong, Nonglak; Hammond, Paula T.; Chiang, Yet-Ming; Belcher, Angela M. (2006-05-12). "Virus-Enabled Synthesis and Assembly of Nanowires for Lithium Ion Battery Electrodes". Science. 312 (5775): 885–888. Bibcode:2006Sci...312..885N. doi:10.1126/science.1122716. ISSN 0036-8075. PMID 16601154.
- Nam, Ki Tae; Shelby, Sarah A.; Choi, Philip H.; Marciel, Amanda B.; Chen, Ritchie; Tan, Li; Chu, Tammy K.; Mesch, Ryan A.; Lee, Byoung-Chul; Connolly, Michael D.; Kisielowski, Christian; Zuckermann, Ronald N. (2010-04-11). "Free-floating ultrathin two-dimensional crystals from sequence-specific peptoid polymers". Nature Materials. 9 (5): 454–460. Bibcode:2010NatMa...9..454N. doi:10.1038/nmat2742. ISSN 1476-1122. PMID 20383129.
- Lee, Hye-Eun; Ahn, Hyo-Yong; Mun, Jungho; Lee, Yoon Young; Kim, Minkyung; Cho, Nam Heon; Chang, Kiseok; Kim, Wook Sung; Rho, Junsuk; Nam, Ki Tae (2018). "Amino-acid- and peptide-directed synthesis of chiral plasmonic gold nanoparticles". Nature. 556 (7701): 360–365. Bibcode:2018Natur.556..360L. doi:10.1038/s41586-018-0034-1. ISSN 0028-0836. PMID 29670265.
- Kim, Ryeong Myeong; Huh, Ji-Hyeok; Yoo, SeokJae; Kim, Tae Gyun; Kim, Changwon; Kim, Hyeohn; Han, Jeong Hyun; Cho, Nam Heon; Lim, Yae-Chan; Im, Sang Won; Im, EunJi; Jeong, Jae Ryeol; Lee, Min Hyung; Yoon, Tae-Young; Lee, Ho-Young (2022-12-14). "Enantioselective sensing by collective circular dichroism". Nature. 612 (7940): 470–476. Bibcode:2022Natur.612..470K. doi:10.1038/s41586-022-05353-1. ISSN 0028-0836. PMID 36517715.
- Lee, Kyu Min; Jang, Jun Ho; Balamurugan, Mani; Kim, Jeong Eun; Jo, Young In; Nam, Ki Tae (2021-07-08). "Redox-neutral electrochemical conversion of CO2 to dimethyl carbonate". Nature Energy. 6 (7): 733–741. doi:10.1038/s41560-021-00862-1. ISSN 2058-7546.
- Jang, Jun Ho; Kim, Changsoo; Nayal, Onkar S.; Yeo, Jia Bin; Kim, Gyu Ri; Kim, Jinju; Jo, Young In; Lee, Ung; Kwon, Min Sang; Nam, Ki Tae (2024-05-23). "Electrochemically initiated synthesis of ethylene carbonate from CO2". Nature Synthesis. 3 (7): 846–857. doi:10.1038/s44160-024-00543-3. ISSN 2731-0582.
