= Hyeon Taeghwan =

South Korean chemist (born 1964)

Taeghwan Hyeon
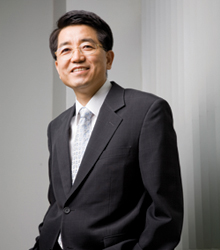
- Born: 1964 (age 61–62); Dalseong County, Daegu, South Korea
- Education: Seoul National University (B.S. 1987, M.S. 1989); University of Illinois at Urbana-Champaign (Ph.D. 1996)
- Known for: Nanotechnology
- Awards: 2008 POSCO TJ Park Prize; 2010 SNU Distinguished Fellow; 2012 Ho-am Prize in Engineering; 2020 Clarivate Citation Laureate
- Scientific career
- Fields: Chemistry, material science, nanoscience
- Workplaces: Northwestern University; Seoul National University; Institute for Basic Science
- Thesis: Nanostructured Catalytic and Magnetic Materials: Sonochemical Synthesis and Characterization
- Doctoral advisor: Kenneth S. Suslick

Korean name
- Hangul: 현택환
- Hanja: 玄澤煥
- RR: Hyeon Taekhwan
- MR: Hyŏn T'aekhwan

Taeghwan Hyeon (Korean: 현택환; born in 1964) is a South Korean chemist. He is SNU distinguished professor in the School of Chemical and Biological Engineering at Seoul National University, director of Center for Nanoparticle Research of Institute for Basic Science (IBS), and an associate editor of the Journal of the American Chemical Society.

Hyeon is recognized by his pioneering work in chemical synthesis of uniformly sized nanocrystals and various applications of functional nanomaterials. In 2011, he was listed as the 37th most cited chemist and the 19th in materials science among "Top 100 Chemists" of the decade by UNESCO&IUPAC. He has published over 350 papers in prominent international journals with more than 70,000 citations and an h-index of 137. Since 2014, he has been listed as a Highly Cited Researcher in chemistry and materials science by Clarivate Analytics and became a Clarivate Citation Laureate in 2020.

== Biography ==
Hyeon was born in Dalseong County, Daegu, South Korea. He received his B.A. degree in 1987 and M.S. in 1989 from Chemistry Department of Seoul National University, and Ph.D. in inorganic chemistry from University of Illinois at Urbana-Champaign in 1996 under the supervision of Kenneth S. Suslick. At Illinois Hyeon studied sonochemical synthesis of nanostructured catalytic and magnetic materials. From June 1996 to July 1997, he was a postdoctoral research associate in the Wolfgang M. H. Sachtler group at Northwestern University. He joined the faculty of the School of Chemical and Biological Engineering at Seoul National University in 1997.

== Career ==
Hyeon is a leading scientist in the area of synthesis, assembly, and biomedical applications of uniformly sized nanoparticles. In particular, his research group developed a new generalized synthetic strategy, called "heat-up process", for producing uniform-sized nanoparticles of many transition metals and oxides without a size selection process. With this simple and inexpensive method, his group went on to design and fabricate multifunctional nanostructured materials for biomedical applications. Hyeon developed a new T1 MRI contrast agent using biocompatible manganese oxide (MnO) nanoparticles, exhibiting detailed anatomic structures of mouse brain. His group reported on the fabrication of monodisperse magnetite nanoparticles immobilized with uniform pore-sized mesoporous silica spheres for simultaneous MRI, fluorescence imaging, and drug delivery. The first demonstration of high-resolution in vivo three-photon imaging using biocompatible and bright Mn^{2+} doped ZnS nanocrystals was published in 2013. Uniformly sized iron oxide nanoclusters could be successfully used as T1 MR contrast agent for high-resolution MR angiography of macaque monkeys.

His research interests also includes engineering the architecture of nanomaterials and utilizing them in lithium-ion batteries, fuel cell electrocatalysts, solar cells, and thermoelectrics. The group reported in 2013 the first demonstration of galvanic replacement reactions in metal oxide nanocrystals, and were able to synthesize hollow nanocrystals of various multimetallic oxides including Mn_{3}O_{4}/γ-Fe_{2}O_{3}. (Ref)

He has delivered more than 30 invited lectures in conferences sponsored by the Materials Research Society, American Chemical Society, and Gordon Research Conferences, and more than 20 invited lectures at UC-Berkeley, Stanford, Harvard, MIT, Cornell, and Columbia.

== Honors and awards ==
- 2025: Madhuri and Jagdish N. Sheth International Alumni Award for Exceptional Achievement, University of Illinois Urbana-Champaign
- 2024: International Member, National Academy of Engineering
- 2023: International Fellow of Royal Swedish Academy of Engineering Sciences
- 2022: NAEK Award, National Academy of Engineering of Korea
- 2020: Korea's Top 5 Bio-Field Research Results and News
- 2020: Clarivate Citation Laureate
- 2017: SNU Distinguished Professor
- 2016: Top Scientist and Technologist Award of Korea, Korean Federation of Science and Technology Societies
- 2016: IUVSTA Prize for Technology (International Union for Vacuum Science, Technique and Applications)
- 2014–: Highly Cited Researcher, Clarivate Analytics, chemistry (2014–2019), materials science (2014–2019)
- 2013: Fellow of Materials Research Society
- 2012: Member of National Academy of Engineering of Korea
- 2012: Ho-Am Prize in Engineering, Samsung Hoam Foundation
- 2011: 100 Leaders in Korea, The Dong-A Ilbo
- 2000–2010: "Top 100 Chemists" of the decade, Thomson Reuters (2011)
- 2010: Member of Korean Academy of Science and Technology
- 2010: SNU Distinguished Fellow
- 2008: POSCO TJ Park Prize, POSCO TJ Park Foundation
- 2007: Shinyang Science Award, Shinyang Foundation
- 2006: Fellow of Royal Society of Chemistry, UK
- 2005: Excellent Researcher Award, Division of Inorganic Chemistry of the Korean Chemical Society
- 2005: The 4th DuPont Science and Technology Award, DuPont Korea
- 2002: Scientist of the Month, Ministry of Science and Technology, Korea
- 2002: 5th Korean Young Scientist Award, Awarded to one researcher in a given field per every other year by the President of South Korea
- 2001: Korean Chemical Society-Wiley Young Chemist Award, Korean Chemical Society
- 2001: Young Scientist Award, Korean Academy of Science and Technology
- 1996: T. S. Piper Award, University of Illinois at Urbana-Champaign, Inorganic Chemistry
- 1993–1996: University of Illinois Chemistry Department Fellowship
- 1991–1996: Korean Government Overseas Fellowship
