= Sunghoon Kwon =

Biomedical engineer and an entrepreneur

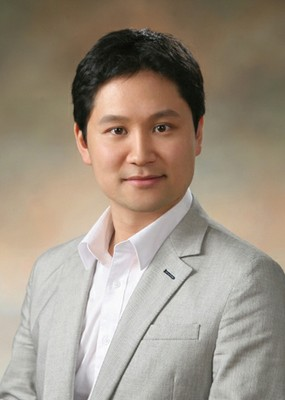
- Sunghoon Kwon
- Born: December 23, 1975 (age 50)
- Education: University of California, Berkeley
- Known for: BioMEMS, Lab on a Chip, Single cell sequencing, Immune Profiling
- Awards: 2011 Young Scientist Award 2012 SNU Creative Leading Researcher; 2013 The Jin-gi Hong Creativity Award; 2013 The 4th annual Yumin Awards; 2014 Lectureship Award on Chemical Society of Japan; 2016 IT Young Engineer Award; 2018 NAEK Young Engineer Award; 2018 The 13th Pioneers of Miniaturization Lectureship; 2019 Jin-Pok Kim's Award for the Best Cancer Research in Korea 2019 National R & D Performance Evaluation Merit Award
- Scientific career
- Fields: Medical Engineering, Bioengineering, Electrical Engineering and Computer Science
- Workplaces: Seoul National University
- Doctoral advisor: Luke Pyungse Lee

Sunghoon Kwon (born 23 December 1975) a Korean biomedical engineer and an entrepreneur. He is the professor of Electrical and Computer Engineering at Seoul National University in Republic of Korea and the CEO of Quantamatrix.

== Education and early life ==
Sunghoon Kwon was born on 23 December 1975 in Seoul; he studied at Yeoksam Middle School and Sangmun High School; he studied at the Department of Electrical Engineering at Seoul National University to become a programmer because he was interested in computer programming since he was a child. In the third year of college, he was admitted to the hospital due to a serious traffic accident, and his dream changed to biomedical engineering as he saw electronic and electrical technologies such as Computed Tomography (CT) and Magnetic Resonance Imaging (MRI) play an important role in medicine. Sunghoon Kwon studied medical devices mainly for doctors at the Department of Medical Engineering at Seoul National University and received a master's degree with the theme of developing a wireless mouse that moves according to eye movements for the disabled. Later, he entered the doctoral program at UC Berkeley, where he studied bio / optical MEMS and lab on a chip system for biomaterial analysis. In 2003, he completed his Ph.D. under the supervision of Luke Pyungse Lee. in three and a half years and studied nanomaterials and nanoprocessing at the Lawrence Berkeley National Laboratory.

== Career ==
Ever since he was appointed professor of the Department of Electrical and Computer Engineering at Seoul National University, he wanted to give tools or devices to life scientists and medical doctors that they needed at the cutting edge of their research to enable innovations. Therefore, for the last 14 years, he and his group have worked towards realization of personalized medicine under the motto: "helping life scientist with technology." and have made technological breakthroughs in personalized medicine that resulted in 80 scientific literatures, 130 patents and 2 spun-off companies hiring more than 200 full-time employees. He focused on developing technologies for life scientists and medical doctors to improve personalized therapeutics to reduce the breakdown cost for disease treatment.

Kwon's research includes work on multiplex bio assay platform, single cell analysis and algorithm for immune profiling

=== Awards and honors ===
Sunghoon Kwon was invited to deliver a plenary talk in IEEE OMN (2020) and delivered invited lectures in international conferences including TEDx talk in Korea Foundation for Advanced Studies (KFAS) (2018) and IEEE MEMS (2017).

He was appointed as one of the eight SNU Creative Distinguished Professors of Seoul National University in 2012. He gained academic recognition of his excellence from both engineering and science by winning many awards including the Young Scientist Award (2011), Korean Young Scientist Award (2012), IEEK/IEEE Joint Awards IT Young Engineer Award (2016), NAEK Young Engineer Award from the National Academy of Engineering of Korea (2018) and the Jin-Pok Kim Award for Best Cancer Research in Korea from Korea Cancer Research Foundation (2019). Kwon is one of few scientists who has early career awards from both National Science Academy and National Engineering Academy at the same time. He is the first Korean winner of the 13th Pioneers of Miniaturization Lectureship, Lab on a Chip Journal (2018). In 2022, he was a Scientist of the Month.

Kwon is a member of the National Academy of Engineering of Korea (NAEK, 2020) and a member of the Young Korean Academy of Science and Technology (Y-KAST, 2017). Kwon served in technical program committees in several societies, including MicroTAS, IEEE MEMS, and Transducers.

== Selected publications ==
1. Lim, D. K.; Jeon, K. S.; Hwang, J. H.; Kim, H.; Kwon, S.; Suh, Y. D.; & Nam, J. M. (2011). Highly uniform and reproducible surface-enhanced Raman scattering from DNA-tailorable nanoparticles with 1-nm interior gap. Nature nanotechnology, 6(7), 452. doi:https://doi.org/10.1038/nnano.2011.79
2. Kim, H.; Ge, J.; Kim, J.; Choi, S. E.; Lee, H.; Lee, H.; Park, W.; Yin, Y.; & Kwon, S. (2009). Structural colour printing using a magnetically tunable and lithographically fixable photonic crystal. Nature Photonics, 3(9), 534–540. doi:https://doi.org/10.1038/nphoton.2009.141
3. Chung, S. E.; Park, W.; Shin, S.; Lee, S. A.; & Kwon, S. (2008). Guided and fluidic self-assembly of microstructures using railed microfluidic channels. Nature materials, 7(7), 581–587. doi:https://doi.org/10.1038/nmat2208
4. Chan, S.; Kwon, S.; Koo, T. W.; Lee, L. P.; & Berlin, A. A. (2003). Surface‐Enhanced Raman Scattering of Small Molecules from Silver‐Coated Silicon Nanopores. Advanced Materials, 15(19), 1595–1598. doi:https://doi.org/10.1002/adma.200305149
5. Lee, H.; Kim, J.; Kim, H.; Kim, J.; & Kwon, S. (2010). Colour-barcoded magnetic microparticles for multiplexed bioassays. Nature materials, 9(9), 745–749. doi:https://doi.org/10.1038/nmat2815
6. Kim, J.; Chung, S. E.; Choi, S. E.; Lee, H.; Kim, J.; & Kwon, S. (2011). Programming magnetic anisotropy in polymeric microactuators. Nature materials, 10(10), 747-752. doi:https://doi.org/10.1038/nmat3090
7. Ge, J.; Lee, H.; He, L.; Kim, J.; Lu, Z.; Kim, H.; Goebl, J.; Kwon, S.; & Yin, Y. (2009). Magnetochromatic microspheres: rotating photonic crystals. Journal of the American Chemical Society, 131(43), 15687–15694. doi:https://doi.org/10.1021/ja903626h
8. Chung, S. E.; Park, W.; Park, H.; Yu, K.; Park, N.; & Kwon, S. (2007). Optofluidic maskless lithography system for real-time synthesis of photopolymerized microstructures in microfluidic channels. Applied Physics Letters, 91(4), 041106. doi:https://doi.org/10.1063/1.2759988
9. Choi, J.; Yoo, J.; Lee, M.; Kim, E. G.; Lee, J. S.; Lee, S.; Joo, S.; Song, S. H.; Kim, E.; Lee, J. C.; Kim, H. C.; Jung, Y.; & Kwon, S. (2014). A rapid antimicrobial susceptibility test based on single-cell morphological analysis. Science translational medicine, 6(267), 267ra174-267ra174. doi:10.1126/scitranslmed.3009650
10. Bae, H. J.; Bae, S.; Park, C.; Han, S.; Kim, J.; Kim, L. N.; Kim, K.; Song, S.; Park, W.; & Kwon, S. (2015). Biomimetic Microfingerprints for Anti‐Counterfeiting Strategies. Advanced Materials, 27(12), 2083–2089. doi:https://doi.org/10.1002/adma.201405483
