= Luke Pyungse Lee =

American bioengineer (born 1959)

- Born: March 22, 1959 (age 67)
- Education: University of California, Berkeley
- Known for: bionanophotonics, microfluidics, optofluidics, molecular diagnostics, nanomedicine,
- Awards: 2003 National Science Foundation Career Award 2005 Lester John and Lynne Dewar Lloyd Distinguished Professorship; 2009 IEEE The William J. Morlock Award; 2010 Arnold and Barbara Silverman Distinguished Professorship 2010 The Ho-Am Prize
- Scientific career
- Fields: Biophysics, Bioengineering, Electrical Engineering and Computer Science
- Workplaces: National University of Singapore

Korean name
- Hangul: 이평세
- RR: I Pyeongse
- MR: I P'yŏngse

Luke Pyungse Lee (born March 22, 1959) is the Arnold and Barbara Silverman Distinguished Professor of Bioengineering, Biophysics, Electrical Engineering and Computer Science, at University of California, Berkeley. He is founding director of the Biomedical Institute for Global Health Research and Technology (BIGHEART) at the National University of Singapore.

Lee was elected Fellow of the Royal Society of Chemistry in 2010 and the American Institute of Medical and Biological Engineering in 2012. Lee received the 2009 IEEE William J. Morlock Award in 2009 and the 2010 Ho-Am Prize for his discovery of PRET and the development of quantum nanobiophotonics for optical gene regulations and molecular imaging (photonic RNA switch and gene circuit).

== Selected publications ==
1. Lee, L. P.; Char, K.; Colclough, M. S.; Zaharchuk, G. (1991-12-02). "Monolithic 77 K dc SQUID magnetometer". Applied Physics Letters. 59 (23). AIP Publishing: 3051–3053. Bibcode:1991ApPhL..59.3051L. doi:10.1063/1.105790. ISSN 0003-6951.
2. Lee, L. P. (2005-11-18). "Inspirations from Biological Optics for Advanced Photonic Systems". Science. 310 (5751). American Association for the Advancement of Science (AAAS): 1148–1150. Bibcode:2005Sci...310.1148L. doi:10.1126/science.1115248. ISSN 0036-8075. PMID 16293752. S2CID 41731247.
3. Ionescu-Zanetti, C.; Shaw, R. M.; Seo, J.; Jan, Y.-N.; Jan, L. Y.; Lee, L. P. (2005-06-20). "Mammalian electrophysiology on a microfluidic platform". Proceedings of the National Academy of Sciences. 102 (26): 9112–9117. Bibcode:2005PNAS..102.9112I. doi:10.1073/pnas.0503418102. ISSN 0027-8424. PMC 1166618. PMID 15967996.
4. Hung, Paul J.; Lee, Philip J.; Sabounchi, Poorya; Lin, Robert; Lee, Luke P. (2004). "Continuous perfusion microfluidic cell culture array for high-throughput cell-based assays". Biotechnology and Bioengineering. 89 (1). Wiley: 1–8. doi:10.1002/bit.20289. ISSN 0006-3592. PMID 15580587.
5. Jeong, K.-H. (2006-04-28). "Biologically Inspired Artificial Compound Eyes". Science. 312 (5773). American Association for the Advancement of Science (AAAS): 557–561. Bibcode:2006Sci...312..557J. doi:10.1126/science.1123053. ISSN 0036-8075. PMID 16645090. S2CID 32656751.
6. Liu, Gang L.; Kim, Jaeyoun; Lu, Yu; Lee, Luke P. (2005-12-18). "Optofluidic control using photothermal nanoparticles". Nature Materials. 5 (1). Springer Science and Business Media LLC: 27–32. doi:10.1038/nmat1528. ISSN 1476-1122. PMID 16362056. S2CID 28584842.
7. Carlo, Dino Di; Wu, Liz Y.; Lee, Luke P. (2006). "Dynamic single cell culture array". Lab on a Chip. 6 (11). Royal Society of Chemistry (RSC): 1445–1449. Bibcode:2006LChip...6.1445C. doi:10.1039/b605937f. ISSN 1473-0197. PMID 17066168.
8. Liu, Gang L.; Yin, Yadong; Kunchakarra, Siri; Mukherjee, Bipasha; Gerion, Daniele; Jett, Stephen D.; Bear, David G.; Gray, Joe W.; Alivisatos, A. Paul; Lee, Luke P.; Chen, Fanqing Frank (2006). "A nanoplasmonic molecular ruler for measuring nuclease activity and DNA footprinting". Nature Nanotechnology. 1 (1). Springer Science and Business Media LLC: 47–52. Bibcode:2006NatNa...1...47L. doi:10.1038/nnano.2006.51. ISSN 1748-3387. PMID 18654141. S2CID 16715844.
9. Liu, Gang Logan; Long, Yi-Tao; Choi, Yeonho; Kang, Taewook; Lee, Luke P (2007-11-18). "Quantized plasmon quenching dips nanospectroscopy via plasmon resonance energy transfer". Nature Methods. 4 (12). Springer Science and Business Media LLC: 1015–1017. doi:10.1038/nmeth1133. ISSN 1548-7091. PMID 18026109. S2CID 27480676.
10. Choi, Yeonho; Park, Younggeun; Kang, Taewook; Lee, Luke P. (2009-09-06). "Selective and sensitive detection of metal ions by plasmonic resonance energy transfer-based nanospectroscopy". Nature Nanotechnology. 4 (11). Springer Science and Business Media LLC: 742–746. Bibcode:2009NatNa...4..742C. doi:10.1038/nnano.2009.258. ISSN 1748-3387. PMID 19893511.
11. Yan, Ruoxue; Park, Ji-Ho; Choi, Yeonho; Heo, Chul-Joon; Yang, Seung-Man; Lee, Luke P.; Yang, Peidong (2011-12-18). "Nanowire-based single-cell endoscopy" (PDF). Nature Nanotechnology. 7 (3). Springer Science and Business Media LLC: 191–196. doi:10.1038/nnano.2011.226. ISSN 1748-3387. OSTI 1223022. PMID 22179570. S2CID 18728241.
12. Lee, Kyuwan; Cui, Yi; Lee, Luke P.; Irudayaraj, Joseph (2014-04-20). "Quantitative imaging of single mRNA splice variants in living cells". Nature Nanotechnology. 9 (6). Springer Science and Business Media LLC: 474–480. Bibcode:2014NatNa...9..474L. doi:10.1038/nnano.2014.73. ISSN 1748-3387. PMC 4426190. PMID 24747838.
