= POSCO TJ Park Prize =

Annual award in South Korea

- Country: South Korea
- Presented by: POSCO TJ Park Foundation
- Rewards: Plaque and 200 million KRW
- First award: 2007
- Prizes given: 59 as of 2023

Korean name
- Hangul: 포스코청암상
- Hanja: 포스코청암賞
- RR: Poseuko Cheongamsang
- MR: P'osŭk'o Ch'ŏngamsang

POSCO TJ Park Prize (Korean: 포스코청암상), also known as the ChungAm Prize (Korean: 청암상), is an annual award presented by the POSCO TJ Park Foundation in four categories; science, education, community development and philanthropy, and technology. The science prize is given to Korean scientists in natural science or engineering. The education prize, community development and philanthropy prize, and technology prize are given to an individual and/or an organization. Only the community development and philanthropy prize is not restricted by nationality. Recommendations are received from June to September, candidates are screened from October to December, the winners are announced in January and the prize presentation ceremony happens in April.

== Laureates ==
Year	Science	Education	Community Development and Philanthropy	Technology
2007	Ihm Jisoon (임지순)	Nonsan Daegeon High School (논산대건고등학교)	Wardah Hafidz (와르다 하피즈)	–
2008	Hyeon Taeghwan (현택환)	Yang Hee-Kyu (양희규)	Buddhist Priest Dobub (도법)	–
2009	Nam Hong Gil (남홍길)	Sunrin Internet High School and Cheon Kwarig-Ho (선린인터넷고등학교와, 천광호)	Abdul Sattar Edhi (압둘 사타르 에디)	–
2010	Park Jong-il (박종일)	Chang Byung-Ho (장병호)	Kim Hae-Sung (김해성)	–
2011	Lee Sangyeop (이상엽)	Namhansan Elementary School (남한산초등학교)	Pomnyun (법륜)	Alola Foundation in East Timor (알로라재단)
2012	Cheon Jinwoo (천진우)	Kwang Jong-Moon (곽종문)	Somaly Mam (소말리맘)	–
2013	Kim Eunjoon (김은준)	Yoon Byeong-hun (윤병훈)	Seo Yeong-nam (서영남)	–
2014	Kim Bum-sig (김범식)	Canaan Farmers School (가나안 농군학교)	Rainbow Community (사회복지법인 무지개공동회)	–
2015	Park Bae-ho (박배호)	Handong Global University (한동대학교)	Bina Swadaya (비나 스와다야 재단)	–
2016	Cho Yoon-jea (조윤제)	Kumoh Technical High School (금오공업고등학교)	Raphael Clinic (라파엘클리닉)	–
2017	Lee Jong-heun (이종흔)	Kyungpook National University’s Attached Middle School (경북대학교 사범대학 부설중학교)	Jimmy Pham (지미 팸)	Kim Myung-hwan (김명환)
2018	Son Young-Woo (손영우)	Posan High School (포산고등학교)	Won Ju-hee (원주희)	Hwang-Cheol-ju (황철주)
2019	Jung Hee Cheon (천정희)	Yeomyeong School (여명학교)	Angkor Hospital for Children (앙코르어린이병원)	Lim Tae-won (임태원)
2020	Hong Song-You (홍성유)	Don Bosco Vocational School (돈보스코 직업전문학교)	Lee Ran Joo (이란주)	Heo Yeom (허염)
2021	Baik Mu-hyun (백무현)	Yongnam Middle School (용남중학교)	Children’s Welfare Action Association Seum (아동복지실천회 세움)	Han Chung (정한)
2022	Ki Tae Nam (남기태)	Yoo Hae-geun (유해근)	Cho Jin-kyung (조진경)	Cha Ki-chul (차기철)
2023	Park Je-geun (박제근)	Choe Jae-Chun (최재천)	Seo Jung-Hwa (서정화)	Park Han-oh (박한오)
2024	Jeong Se-young (정세영)	Park Young-do (박영도)	Lee Ho-taeg (이호택)	–
2025	Moon J. Park (박문정)	Pohang Myeongdo School (포항명도학교)	Chu Hye-in and Lee Cheol-yong (추혜인, 이철용)	Kim Jin-dong 김진동

== See also ==
- Ho-Am Prize in Science
- Ho-Am Prize in Community Service
