= Bina Swadaya =

Indonesian NGO for development

Bina Swadaya (Yayasan Pengembangan Swadaya Masyarakat) is a large Indonesian NGO focused on development.

== History ==
Bina Swadaya was founded by the Ikatan Petani Pancasila (Pancasila Farmers Association) on 24 May 1967. It was initially named the Yayasan Sosial Tani Membangun (Peasant Socio-economic Development Foundation). The establishment of Bina Swadaya was thereby related to the existence of Gerakan Sosial Pancasila (Pancasila Social Movement) made up of laborers, farmers, fishermen, paramedics, and entrepreneurs. The goal of the Pancasila Social Movement was to empower the community in accordance with the Pancasila ideals of independence of the Republic of Indonesia. As an independence and community empowerment vehicle, Bina Swadaya aims to work within the context of existing challenges. For its optimum performance and impact, the organization and approach of Bina Swadaya aids to undertake work which is suitable in the local social, economic and political environment.

- Social Movement Era (1954–1973)

Particularly during the period of Old Order Regime, Bina Swadaya was a mass organization, characterized with activities mainstreaming the empowerment of the community in political decision.

- Socio-Economic Development Institution Era (1974–1998)

During the period of New Order Regime, Bina Swadaya particularly appeared as a socio-economic development institution. Bina Swadaya was a managed social laboratory and its lesson learned being used to cooperate with Government as well as other non governmental organizations for wider impact.

- Social Entrepreneurship Era (1999–current)

Following the marked movement toward democratization and decentralization in Indonesia beginning in 1999, Bina Swadaya transformed into a social entrepreneurship developing self-supporting community empowerment organization.

== Foot prints ==
In performing the mission, Bina Swadaya has conducted many programs in cooperation with various stakeholders who care for the poor:

- Developing 650,00 community-based groups for income generating activities (UPPKS) in collaboration with BKBN.
- Developing 120,00 Self-Help Groups (SHGs) in collaboration with National Development Planning Board (Bappenas) and the Ministry of Home Affairs, Republic of Indonesia.
- Developing 60,000 marginal fisherman groups in collaboration with Ministry of Agriculture.
- Developing Program for Linking Bank and Self-Help Group (PHBK) in collaboration with Bank Indonesia, BRI, and GTZ.
- Developing Program of Social Forestry in collaboration with Perum Perhutani and the Ford Foundation.
- Developing Integrated Irrigation Program in collaboration with Ministry of Public Works.

== Activities ==
To reach its vision and to carry out its missions Bina Swadaya diverts its activities into seven categories as follows:

- Community Empowerment. In the form of regional development activities, Public Health, Sanitation, Environment, Farming, and Labor by way of: research, training, consultation, and facilitation. (Educational and Training Center, Center of Studies, Consultancy and Branch Office)
- Micro Finance Development. Micro Finance Services is carried out through Banking Financial Institution and Non-Banking institution; reaching the poor and the marginalized. (Bina Arta Swadaya, Rural Banks, Micro Finance Institution)
- Agribusiness Development. By way of product marketing activities and farm production facilities, developing farm shop toward franchise system (Trubus Mitra Swadaya).
- Development Communication. Supply information to different field of development area through publishing magazine, book, radio and TV program, VCD. (Trubus Swadaya, Penebar Swadaya, Puspa Swara, Trubus Media Swadaya and Niaga Swadaya).
- Alternative Tourism Development. Organize Tour Program orientated to education, environment, culture and development (Bina Swadaya Tours).
- Printing Service. Managing printing industry to support development communication activities and increase institutional income. (Penebar Swadaya Printing House)
- Wisma Hijau Training Centre. Provide facilities for meeting, training, workshop and seminar. (Wisma Hijau – Kampus Diklat Bina Swadaya)

== Viewpoint ==
Bina Swadaya views the problem of poverty in a slightly different light. Instead of coming up with solutions by itself, the foundation considers the poor as subjects rather than objects of anti-poverty programs. Since the poor in this region are viewed as 'the have little' type, Bina Swadaya believes that by organizing their resources and developing in a collective way to form a self-reliant group, the poor themselves will be able to come up with their own solutions to their own problems which at the same time gives them a sense of achievement and making them independent in the process. As Bambang Ismawan who is the founder and director of Bina Swadaya says, "We do not offer a solution. We only listen to the people and help them find the best solution. It is really something to see their faces light up when they find a solution to their problems,".

== Approach & Efforts ==
Bina Swadaya has chosen micro finance as a tool to empower the poor in Indonesia. According to the foundation, Self-Help Groups (SHG) forms the foundation for micro finance development. It is because these groups teach them how to be self-reliant and how to conduct savings and credit activities which is essential for the poor in time to come when they begin their own micro businesses.

An example of such a SHG would be Arta Mekar Mulya Group which is located in Sidamulya village, the District of Subang, the province of West Java where 91.5% of the village population are peasants where the majority of the land owners possess less than 0.5 hectares. The first successful project of Bina Swadaya in Sidamulya village was the pump irrigation project that was started in 1985. Its main objective was to increase the productivity of uncultivated wet rice fields and it was achieved when the rice production increased from three tons to eight tons per hectare.

Since the sustainability of the pump irrigation project was a problem due to high operational costs, Bina Swadaya changed its approach in 1994. Its new objectives were to strengthen the existing SHGs and to increase the availability of the micro finance scheme to the villagers. And a rural bank, BPR Abdiarta Swadaya was established by Bina Swadaya as a course of action to achieve its new objectives. The majority members of Arta Mekar Mulya Group who were micro entrepreneurs and peasants now could borrow up to Rp. 400.000 without any form of physical collateral allowing them to expand their micro businesses or further improving their rice farming which will aid in increasing the productivity as well. The success of the SHG attracted villagers from other villages to become members of Arta Mekar Mulya Group and this greatly freed many villagers from heavy debts as now instead of borrowing from money lenders who charged exorbitant rates of interest, they can seek financial help from Arta Mekar Mulya Group. Another attribute of this SHG is that instead of only focusing on the well-being of its group members, the profits which were the fruits of their success were channeled to address other social needs of the village as well which resulted in shops, bridges and the establishment of other community infrastructures.

== Awards ==
- 2015: POSCO TJ Park Prize, POSCO TJ Park Foundation
