= Chung Joon-yang =

South Korean businessman and former POSCO chief executive officer

Chung Joon-Yang
- Born: February 3, 1948 (age 78); Su-won, South Korea
- Occupation: Chairman of National Academy of Engineering of Korea
- Known for: CEO of POSCO

- Korean name
- Hangul: 정준양
- Hanja: 鄭俊陽
- RR: Jeong Junyang
- MR: Chŏng Chunyang

Chung Joon-Yang (born February 3, 1948) is a South Korean businessman, former POSCO chief executive officer, who presently serves as Chairman of National Academy of Engineering of Korea.

== Biography ==
Chung joined POSCO as an associate in 1975. He has contributed to the improvement of the competitiveness of POSCO, leading the development of major technology. He served as chief of Po-hang Iron and Steel Company's branch in Belgium and later served as vice manager of Iron and Steel Making Plant Group at Gwang-yang steelwork in 2003 and was promoted to the chief of Gwang-yang steelwork in 2004. Also, he was the director of the manufacturing technology department and the vice-president of POSCO in 2006. Furthermore, he was appointed as the CEO of POSCO E&C in 2008 and rose to the CEO of POSCO in February, 2009. In addition, he has been the 8th executive director of POSTECH from April, 2011. Moreover, he was appointed as the chief of National Academy of Engineering of Korea.

== Education ==
- 1966 Seoul National University High School
- 1975 Seoul National University, Technical Education bachelor's degree
- 1999 Sunchon National University, Metal Engineering master's degree

== Career ==
- 1975.03 Joining Pohang Iron & Steel Co.
- 1975.04~1984.09 Manager of Steel Manufacture Technology at Pohang Iron & Steel Company in Pohang
- 1984.10~1991.07 Chief of 1st Steel Manufacture at Pohang Iron & Steel Company's in Gwangyang
- 1991.07~1998.12 Chief of Steel Production Technology at Pohang Iron & Steel Company
- 1999.01~2002.03 Chief of Pohang Iron & Steel Company in EU Branch
- 2002.03~2003.03 Director of POSCO in EU Branch
- 2003.03~2004.03 Vice Director of the Iron & Steel Making Department in Gwangyang
- 2004.03~2006.02 Director of POSCO in Gwangyang
- 2006.02~2007.02 Vice President of POSCO in the Manufacturing Technology
- 2007.02~2008.11 President POSCO in the Manufacturing Technology
- 2008.11~2014.03 CEO of POSCO
- 2009.03~ Present Chairman of 7th Korea Iron & Steel Association
- 2009.10~ Present Member of the executive committee in International Iron and Steel Institute
- 2011.03~Present, Representative of multi-cultural families forum
- 2011.06~ Present, President of National Academy of Engineering of Korea

== Major activities ==
- 2004.03~ Present, International Iron and Steel Institute, technical subcommittee, regular member
- 2006.03~ Present, The Federation of the Korean Industries, Small And Medium Business Collaboration Center, director
- 2007.10~ Present, The Federation of the Korean Industries, Korea-Australia Economic Cooperation, chairman
- 2008.02~ Present, National Academy of Engineering of Korea, regular member
- 2008.10~ Present, Korean Institute of Metal and Materials, President

== Awards ==
- 1992.10 A presidential citation (benefits for construction)
- 1994.04 Korean Institute of Metal, technological prize
- 2007.05 Gold Tower Order of Industrial Service Merit
- 2008 The 8th prize of honored citizen
- 2009 CEO of this year selected by MAEGYEONG Economy
- 2011 The 9th most honored enterpriser
- 2011 Grand prized CEO of Korea in manufacturing industry
- 2012 The figure of moving Korean economy

== Performance ==
When he was chief of Gwangyang steel mill, he oversaw domestic production of advanced automotive steel sheet, which became a major profit center for POSCO. He also supervised the development of equipment and technology for automotive steel production at the Gwangyang lant, which had an annual production capacity of 6.5 million tons.
