= Cheon Jinwoo =

South Korean chemist

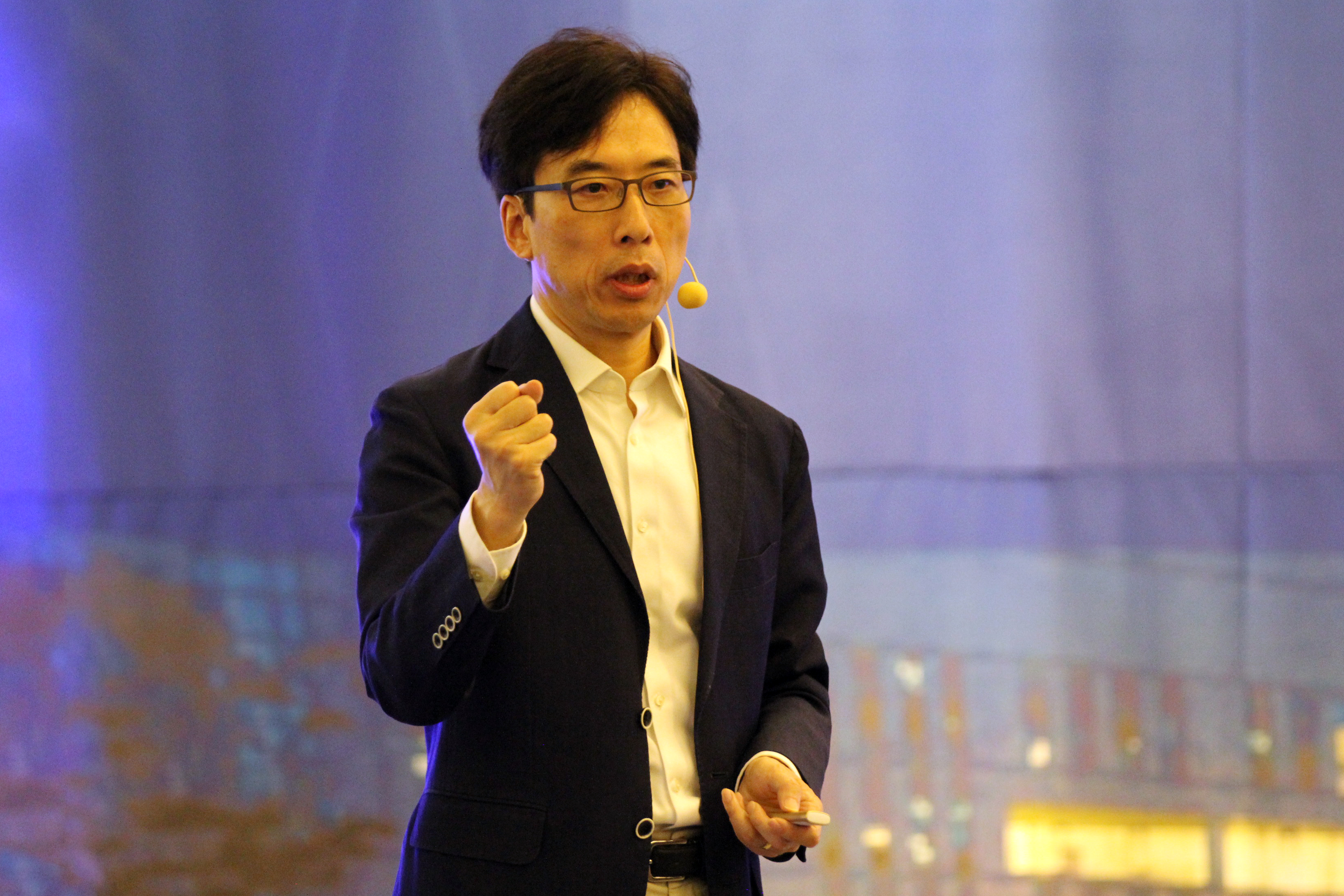
- Born: 1962 (age 63–64)
- Education: Yonsei University, University of Illinois at Urbana-Champaign
- Known for: Nanoscience and nanomedicine
- Awards: 2010 Inchon Award (Inchon Memorial Foundation) 2012 Korea's 100 Most Influential Person for Next 10 Years (DongA Daily News); 2012 POSCO TJ Park Prize (POSCO TJ Park Foundation) 2015 Ho-Am Prize in Science (Ho-Am Foundation)
- Scientific career
- Fields: Inorganic chemistry, materials chemistry, nanoscience, nanocrystals
- Workplaces: Yonsei University, Institute for Basic Science, Center for Nanomedicine
- Theses: Ethylenediamine-N, N'-di-S-α-Isohexanoic acid 및 관련 ONNO-Type 리간드의 코발트(III) 착물 (1987); Mechanistic Studies of the Chemical Vapor Deposition of Ceramic and Metal Films From Organometallic Precursors (1993)
- Doctoral advisors: Gregory S. Girolami

Korean name
- Hangul: 천진우
- RR: Cheon Jinu
- MR: Ch'ŏn Chinu
- Website: cheongroup.yonsei.ac.krㅤ ibs.yonsei.ac.kr

Cheon Jinwoo is a South Korean chemist and nanomedicine researcher. He is the H. G. Underwood Professor of Chemistry at Yonsei University, the founding director of the Center for Nanomedicine at the Institute for Basic Science (IBS), and the director of the Max Planck–Yonsei IBS Center for Nanomedicine Deep Tissue Control (MPYIC).

Cheon is recognized for his contributions to inorganic materials chemistry and nanomedicine. His research focuses on developing chemical principles for the synthesis of inorganic nanoparticles and nanoprobes, and on their application to imaging, sensing, and controlling cellular functions in deep tissues of living systems.

Cheon is a fellow of the American Chemical Society, the Royal Society of Chemistry, and the Korean Academy of Science and Technology. He serves as an associate editor of the Journal of the American Chemical Society(JACS) and previously served as a senior editor of Accounts of Chemical Research(ACR). He is also a member of the editorial advisory boards of several leading scientific journals, including C&EN.

Throughout his career, he has received numerous awards, including the Inchon Award, the POSCO TJ Park Prize, and the Ho-Am Prize in Science. He has also been named a Clarivate Analytics Highly Cited Researcher and received the Glenn T. Seaborg Memorial Lectureship in Chemistry.

== Education ==
Cheon began his academic studies in chemistry at Yonsei University in 1981, where he earned his Bachelor of Science and Master of Science degrees in 1985 and 1987, respectively. He received his Ph.D. in chemistry in 1993 from the University of Illinois at Urbana–Champaign under the supervision of Professor Gregory S. Girolami.

== Career and Research ==
After completing his doctoral studies, Cheon conducted postdoctoral research at the UC Berkeley, and worked as a research associate at the UCLA. He later returned to South Korea, where he joined the KAIST, serving as an assistant and then associate professor.

In 2002, he joined Yonsei University as a faculty member and later became the H. G. Underwood Professor of Chemistry. From 2010 to 2016, he served as the director of the National Creative Research Initiative Center for Evolutionary Nanoparticles. In 2015, he became the founding director of the IBS Center for Nanomedicine at Yonsei University. In 2025, he co-founded Asia’s second Max Planck Center, the Max Planck–Yonsei IBS Center for Nanomedicine Deep Tissue Control, serving as co-director alongside Professor Joachim Spatz of the Max Planck Institute for Medical Research.

Cheon’s research has contributed to the development of nanomaterial-based biomedical technologies, including highly sensitive magnetic resonance imaging (MRI) contrast agents and nanoscale toolkits for cellular manipulation. In 2004, he experimentally demonstrated size-dependent MRI contrast effects using nanoparticles, which led to the development of magnetism-engineered iron oxide nanoparticles as ultra-sensitive MRI contrast agents with potential applications in early cancer detection.

He has also developed magnetic nanomachines composed of mechanically functional components at the submicrometer scale, enabling remote and precise control of nanostructures using external magnetic fields. These systems have been explored for applications such as targeted drug delivery and minimally invasive therapeutic approaches.

Since 2021, Cheon’s work has significantly advanced the field of magnetogenetics, particularly for wireless control of deep tissue and brain activity in vivo. Magnetogenetics employs magnetic nanoparticles to generate mechanical forces or torque that activate mechanosensitive ion channels, such as Piezo1, enabling non-invasive and long-distance modulation of neuronal circuits. This approach offers new tools for studying brain function and has potential implications for the treatment of neurological disorders.

== Awards and honors ==
- 2026: Top Scientist and Technologist Award of Korea, Korean Federation of Science and Technology Societies
- 2025: NAS Prize (National Academy of Science of Korea)
- 2024: Glenn T. Seaborg Memorial Lecture in Inorganic Chemistry
- 2024: Humboldt Research Award
- 2018: Madhuri and Jagdish N. Sheth International Alumni Award for Exceptional Achievement (University of Illinois)
- 2015: Ho-Am Prize in Science (HOAM Foundation)
- 2014: The World's Most Influential Scientific Minds (Thomson Reuters)
- 2013: KCS Academic Achievement Award (Korean Chemical Society)
- 2012: POSCO TJ Park Prize (POSCO TJ Park Foundation)
- 2012: Korea's 100 Most Influential Person for Next 10 Years (DongA Daily News)
- 2010: Inchon Award (Inchon Memorial Foundation)
- 2007: Song-Gok Science Prize (Korea Institute of Science and Technology)
- 2004: KCS Award in Inorganic Chemistry (Korean Chemical Society)
- 2002: Young Scientist Award, Korean Academy of Science and Technology
- 2001: Wiley Young Chemist Award (Korean Chemical Society-Wiley & Sons)

== Selected recent publications ==
- Choi, SH.; Cheon, J.; et al. “In vivo magnetogenetics for cell-type-specific targeting and modulation of brain circuits” Nat. Nanotechnol. 2024, 19, 1333.
- Lin, M.; Lungerich, D.; Cheon, J.; et al. “A magnetically powered nanomachine with a DNA clutch” Nat. Nanotechnol. 2024, 19, 646.
- Kim, W.-S.; Shapiro, M.G.; Cheon, J.; et al. “Magneto-acoustic protein nanostructures for non-invasive imaging of tissue mechanics in vivo” Nat. Mater. 2024, 23, 290.
- Lee, J. U.; Cheon, J.; et al. "Non-contact long-range magnetic stimulation of mechanosensitive ion channels in freely moving animals" Nat. Mater. 2021, 20, 1029.
- Shin, T.-H.; Cheon, J.; et al. "High-resolution T1 MRI via renally clearable dextran nanoparticles with an iron oxide shell" Nat. Biomed. Eng. 2021, 5, 252.
- Cheong, J.; Lee, H.; Cheon, J.; et al. "Fast detection of SARS-CoV-2 RNA via the integration of plasmonic thermocycling and fluorescence detection in a portable device" Nat. Biomed. Eng. 2020, 4, 1159.
- Choi, J.; Kim, S.; Cheon, J.; et al. "Distance-dependent magnetic resonance tuning as a versatile MRI sensing platform for biological targets" Nat. Mater. 2017, 16, 537.
- Seo, D.; Southard, K.M.; Cheon, J.; Jun, Y-w.; et al. "A Mechanogenetic toolkit for interrogating cell signaling in space and time" Cell, 2016, 165, 1507.
- Cho, M. H.; Cheon, J.; et al. “A Magnetic Switch for the Control of Cell Death Signaling in in vitro and in vivo Systems” Nat. Mater. 2012, 11, 1038.
- Lee, J.; Cheon, J.; et al. "Exchange-coupled Magnetic Nanoparticles for Efficient Heat Induction" Nat. Nanotechnol. 2011, 6, 418.
- Lee, J.; Cheon, J.; et al. "Artificially Engineered Magnetic Nanocrystals for Ultra-Sensitive Molecular Imaging" Nat. Med. 2007, 13, 95.
