= Sol Chin =

South Korean conductor (born 1987)

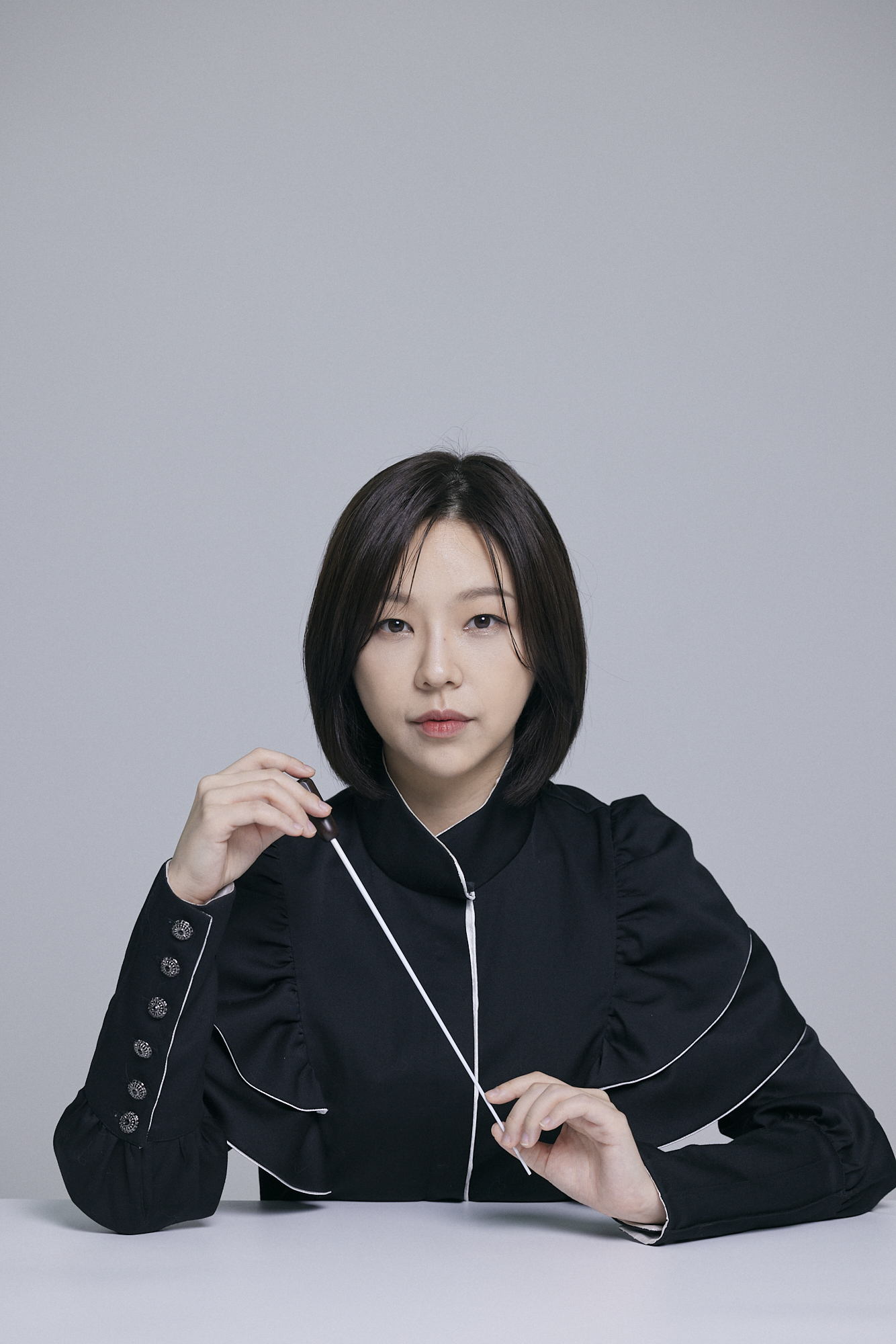
- Sol Chin in 2023

Background information
- Born: 21 July 1987 (age 39); Seoul, South Korea
- Occupation: Conductor
- Website: sol-chin.com

Korean name
- Hangul: 진솔
- RR: Jin Sol
- MR: Chin Sol

Sol Chin (Korean: 진솔, [dʒin sol]; born 21 July 1987) is a South Korean conductor.

== Early life and education ==
Sol Chin was born in Seoul, South Korea, and received early musical training in piano, composition, and vocal music from her parents, both music professors in South Korea. Chin furthered her studies in conducting at the Korea National University of Arts and Hochschule für Musik und Darstellende Kunst Mannheim.

== Career ==
Chin has conducted orchestras in Europe and Asia, including the Philharmonie Baden-Baden and Südwestdeutsche Philharmonie Konstanz in Germany, and the State Opera Plovdiv Orchestra in Bulgaria. In South Korea, she has conducted the KBS Symphony Orchestra, National Orchestra of Korea, and Daejeon Philharmonic Orchestra, among others. In 2019, Chin was invited by the Eskisehir Metropolitan Municipality Symphony Orchestra in Turkey, where her concerts were positively received by local media.

Chin has been invited to conduct at major festivals such as the ARKO Korean Contemporary Music Festival, Daegu International Contemporary Music Festival and Seoul International Music Festival. She serves as the artistic director and CEO of Flasic, a platform company specializing in planning and producing game music orchestra concerts. Through Flasic, Chin works with game companies like Blizzard Entertainment, 2K, and Game Freak to promote concerts and copyright protection.

Since 2016, Chin has led the Mahlerian project, dedicated to performing Gustav Mahler's complete symphonies. She holds positions as chief conductor of the Daegu International Symphony Orchestra, artistic director of the Artisee Orchestra, and adjunct professor at Korea National University of Arts. In recent years, Chin has conducted the Berliner Symphoniker at the Amsterdam Concertgebouw, North Czech Philharmonic Teplice at the Rudolfinum Dvorak Hall, and Prague Symphony Orchestra at the Musikverein in Vienna. Also in 2023, she was a consultant for the drama Maestra: Strings of Truth, about a female conductor, and taught conducting to actress Lee Young-ae. In recognition of her contributions, she was honored with the 2024 Hong Jin-Ki Creator Award in the Culture and Arts sector.

== Awards ==
- 2024 Hong Jin-Ki Creator Award, Culture and Arts sector (2024)
