= Magnetogenetics =

Manipulation of cells using magnetic fields

Magnetogenetics is a medical research technique whereby magnetic fields are used to affect cell function.

== History ==
The development of genetic technologies that can modulate cellular processes has greatly contributed to biological research. A representative example is the development of optogenetics, which is a neuromodulation tool kit that involves light-sensitive proteins such as opsins. This progress provided the grounds for a breakthrough in linking the causal relationship between neuronal activity and behavioral outcome.

The foremost strength of the genetic toolkits used in neuromodulation is that it can provide either spatially or temporally, or both, precise modulation of the brain nervous system. To date, several technologies are adapted with genetics (e.g. optogenetics, chemogenetics, etc.), and each technology has strengths and limits. For example, optogenetics has advantages in that it can provide temporally and spatially precise manipulation of neurons. On the other hand, it involves light stimulation, which cannot penetrate tissues effectively and requires implanted optical devices, limiting its applications for in vivo live animal studies

Techniques that rely on the magnetic control of cellular process are relatively new. This technique may provide an approach that does not require implantation of invasive electrodes or optical devices. This method will allow penetration in to the deeper region of the brain, and may have lower response latency. In 1980, Young and colleagues have shown that magnetic fields with magnitudes in millitesla range are able to penetrate into the brain without attenuation of the signal or side effects because of the negligible magnetic susceptibility and low conductivity of biological tissue. Early attempts to manipulate electrical signaling within brain using magnetic fields was performed by Baker et al., who later developed devices for transcranial magnetic stimulation (TMS) in 1985.

To apply magnetogenetics in biological and neuroscientific research, fusing TRPV class receptors with a paramagnetic protein (typically ferritin) was suggested. These paramagnetic proteins, which typically contain iron or have iron-containing cofactors, are then magnetically stimulated. How this technique can modulate neuronal activity remains unclear but it is thought that the ion channels are activated and opened either by mechanical force exerted by the paramagnetic proteins, or by heating of these via magnetic stimulation. However, availability of such paramagnetic proteins as a transducer for magnetic field to mechanical or temperature stimuli is controversial.

On the other hand, nanoparticles have been suggested as possible candidates that can function as the transducer of magnetic field to the stimulus cue. Based on this concept, next generation of magnetogenetics technique is being developed. In 2010, Arnd Pralle and colleges showed that the first in vivo magneto-thermal stimulation of heat sensitive ion channel TRPV1 that employs magnetic nanoparticles as a transducer in C. elegans. In 2012, Seung Chan Kim showed gene expression profile change of total human genome approximately 30,000 genes using 0.2T static magnetic fields. In 2015, Polina Anikeeva's research group demonstrated that similar concept can enhance the neuronal signals in mammalian brain. In 2021, Jinwoo Cheon's research group has successfully developed the magneto-mechanical genetics which uses magnetic stimulation derived mechanical force in mammalian. In this study, magnetic torque by rotating magnetic field was employed to activate the mechanosensitive cation channel Piezo1. Results of this study show that remote, in vivo manipulation of behavior of mice can be done using magnetogenetics. Cheon's group further developed a magnetogenetic system enables cell-type-specific modulation of deep brain neural circuits. This was achieved by combining Piezo1 ion channels and Cre-loxP technology, allowing precise, reversible, and wireless control of neuronal activity in freely moving animals. The study demonstrated significant potential for neuroscience research by demonstrating several applications such as feeding behavior modulation, long-term obesity control, and social interaction studies. This torque-based system developed by Cheon is anticipated to be valuable not only for neuroscience research but also for various deep tissue in vivo applications and therapeutics.

== Issues ==
=== Physical limitation of the ferritin ===
One of the main issues in magnetogenetics is related the physical properties of the ferritin. The ferritin is composed of 24 subunits of protein complex and a small iron oxide core. The core of the ferritin is in the form of ferric hydroxide which has antiferromagnetic properties. Some researchers have reported that ferritin has remnant magnetization due to their intrinsic defect and impurities. However, even with optimistic calculations, the magnetic interaction energy for heat or force generation is several orders below than thermal fluctuation energy. Recently, other researchers hypothesized that there are other possible mechanisms for activating the ion channels, but these studies remain inconclusive.

== See also ==
- Deep brain stimulation
- Magnetic nanoparticles
- Regenerative medicine
- Tissue engineering
- Transcranial magnetic stimulation
