= Hong Jin-Ki Creator Award =

Academic award of South Korea

- Date: 2010
- Country: South Korea
- Presented by: Joongang Hwadong Foundation
- Rewards: KRW 100 million, medal and plaque
- First award: 2010
- Website: Joongang Hwadong Foundation

- Hong Jin-Ki Creator Award
- Hangul: 홍진기 창조인상
- Hanja: 洪璡基 創造人賞
- RR: Hong Jingi changjoinsang
- MR: Hong Chin'gi ch'angjoinsang

Alternative name
- Hangul: 유민상
- Hanja: 維民賞
- RR: Yuminsang
- MR: Yuminsang

The Hong Jin-Ki Creator Award (Korean: 홍진기 창조인상), sometimes referred to as the Yumin Award (유민상), is given every May to individuals or groups who have achieved creative achievements in the fields of science and technology, social sciences, and culture and arts. The award was made in honor of Hong Jin-ki and is funded and given by the Joongang Hwadong Foundation.

== Laureates ==
| Year | Science and Technology | Social Sciences | Culture and Arts | Special Prize | Contribution Award |
|---|---|---|---|---|---|
| 2010 | Hong Byung-hee (홍병희); Sungkyunkwan University | Voluntary Agency Network of Korea (반크); Cyber Diplomatic Mission | Kim Young-joon (김영준); Urban architecture | – | – |
| 2011 | Kim Eunseong (김은성); KAIST | McGee Youth Social Education Center (맥지청소년사회교육원) – | Park Jong-seon (박종선); Furniture designer | – | – |
| 2012 | Kim Jinhyun (김진현); Korea Institute of Science and Technology | Lee Guk-jong (이국종); Ajou University Hospital | Lee Ja-ram (이자람); Performing artist | – | – |
| 2013 | Kim Seung-geun (김승근); Composer | Psy (싸이); Musician | Kwon Sunghoon (권성훈); Seoul National University | – | – |
| 2014 | Jeong Gwang-hoon (정광훈); Massachusetts Institute of Technology | Jeju Olle Association (사단법인 제주올레) – | Seo Jin-seok (서진석); Daehan Space Loop | – | – |
| 2015 | Kim Dae-Hyeong (김대형); Seoul National University | Yoon Tae-ho (윤태호); Cartoonist, Korea Cartoonist Association | Jo Min-seok (조민석); Mass Studies | – | – |
| 2016 | Hanmi Pharm Research Center (한미약품연구센터); Hanmi Pharm | Lee Saedol (이세돌); Engineer | Kim Daljin (김달진); Daljin Art Museum | – | – |
| 2017 | Kim Jin-soo (김진수); Institute for Basic Science/ Seoul National University | Choi In-cheol (최인철); Seoul National University | Moon Yeong-dae (문영대); Art critic | – | – |
| 2018 | Park Yong-geun (박용근); KAIST and Tomocube | Women's Curling Olympic Team (여자 컬링 올림픽 대표팀); Korean national team | Ryu Jae-jun (류재준); Seoul International Music Festival | – | – |
| 2019 | Choi Jangwook (최장욱); Seoul National University | Park Eunjung (박은정); Kyung Hee University | Son Yeol-eum (손열음); Pianist | – | – |
| 2020 | Jang Hyesik (장혜식); Seoul National University | – | Ko Seon-woong (고선웅); Theater director | Lee O-young (이어령); Ministry of Culture | – |
| 2021 | Kim Sujong (김수종); Innospace | lee Sooin (이수인); Enuma | Kim Boram (김보람); Ambiguous Dance Company | – | Song Seung-hwan (송승환); Actor, artistic director |
| 2022 | Noh Jun-seok (노준석); Pohang University of Science and Technology | Tongyeong International Music Festival (통영국제음악제); Tongyeong International Music Foundation | Anton Hur (허정범); Translator | Lee Hong-gu (이홍구); Prime Minister | – |
| 2023 | Kang Ki-seok (강기석); Seoul National University | Kim Seongmin (김성민); Brother Keeper | Ryu Seong-hie (류성희); Film director and production designer | – | – |
| 2024 | Cha Meeyoung (차미영); Institute for Basic Science | Hanmaeum Education Volunteer Group (한마음교육봉사단) – | Sol Chin (진솔); Conductor | – | – |
| 2025 | Bak Jinyeong (박진영); New York University | Byeon Hyeondan (변현단); Tojong Seedream (토종씨드림) | Lee Hanurij (이하느리); Composer | – | – |

== See also ==
- Kyung-Ahm Prize
- Korea Science Award
