= Cho Seong-jin =

Cho Seong-jin (Korean: 조성진) is a Korean name consisting of the family name Cho and the given name Seong-jin, and may also refer to:

- Cho Sung-jin (born 1985), South Korean footballer
- Seong-Jin Cho (born 1994), South Korean pianist
