= Yadong Yin =

Chinese chemist

Yadong Yin is a Chinese chemist.

Raised in rural China, Yin's interest in science began when his parents asked him to fix radios. Yin earned his Bachelor of Science and Master of Science in chemistry at the University of Science and Technology of China in 1996 and 1998, before moving to the United States for a PhD at the University of Washington, where he was advised by Younan Xia. From 2003 to 2005, Yin pursued postdoctoral research at the University of California, Berkeley, guided by Paul Alivisatos. Yin then joined the Lawrence Berkeley National Laboratory as a staff scientist for one year, before accepting a faculty position at the University of California, Riverside, where he was promoted to full professor in 2014. In 2026, Yin was appointed deputy editor of ACS Nanoscience Au, and elected a fellow of the American Association for the Advancement of Science.
