= Nature Materials =

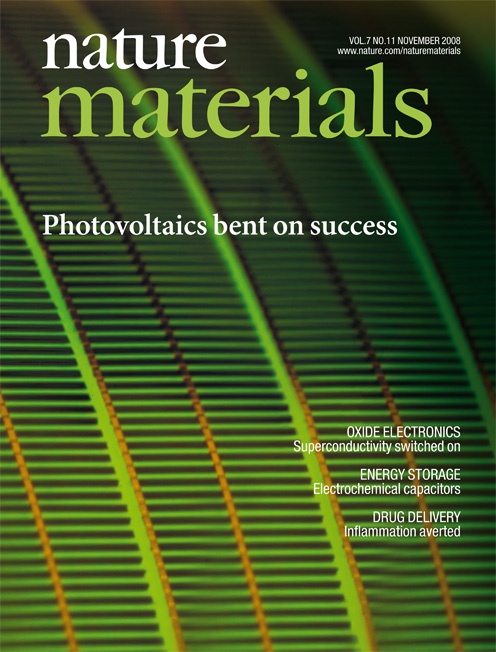
- Discipline: Materials science
- Language: English
- Edited by: Vincent Dusastre

Publication details
- History: 2002–present
- Publisher: Nature Portfolio (United Kingdom)
- Frequency: Monthly
- Open access: Hybrid
- Impact factor: 38 (2025)

Standard abbreviations
- ISO 4: Nat. Mater.

Indexing
- CODEN: NMAACR
- ISSN: 1476-1122 (print); 1476-4660 (web)
- LCCN: 2003260101
- OCLC no.: 51211555

Links
- Journal homepage; Online archive

Nature Materials is a monthly peer-reviewed scientific journal published by Nature Portfolio. It was launched in September 2002. Vincent Dusastre is the launching and current chief editor.

== Aims and scope ==
Nature Materials is focused on all topics within the combined disciplines of materials science and engineering. Topics published in the journal are presented from the view of the impact that materials research has on other scientific disciplines such as (for example) physics, chemistry, and biology. Coverage in this journal encompasses fundamental research and applications from synthesis to processing, and from structure to composition. Coverage also includes basic research and applications of properties and performance of materials. Materials are specifically described as "substances in the condensed states (liquid, solid, colloidal)", and which are "designed or manipulated for technological ends."

Furthermore, Nature Materials functions as a forum for the materials scientist community. Interdisciplinary research results are published, obtained from across all areas of materials research, and between scientists involved in the different disciplines. The readership for this journal are scientists, in both academia and industry involved in either developing materials or working with materials-related concepts. Finally, Nature Materials perceives materials research as significantly influential on the development of society.

== Coverage ==
Research areas covered in the journal include:

- Engineering and structural materials (metals, alloys, ceramics, composites)
- Organic and soft materials (glasses, colloids, liquid crystals, polymers)
- Bio-inspired, biomedical and biomolecular materials
- Optical, photonic and optoelectronic materials
- Magnetic materials
- Materials for electronics
- Superconducting materials
- Catalytic and separation materials
- Materials for energy
- Nanoscale materials and processes
- Computation, modelling and materials theory
- Surfaces and thin films
- Design, synthesis, processing and characterization techniques

In addition to primary research, Nature Materials also publishes review articles, news and views, research highlights about important papers published in other journals, commentaries, correspondence, interviews and analysis of the broad field of materials science.

== Abstracting and indexing ==
Nature Materials is indexed in the following databases:

- Chemical Abstracts Service – CASSI
- Science Citation Index
- Science Citation Index Expanded
- Current Contents – Physical, Chemical & Earth Sciences
- BIOSIS Previews
