= Park Systems =

South Korean scientific instrument manufacturer

Park Systems Corp.
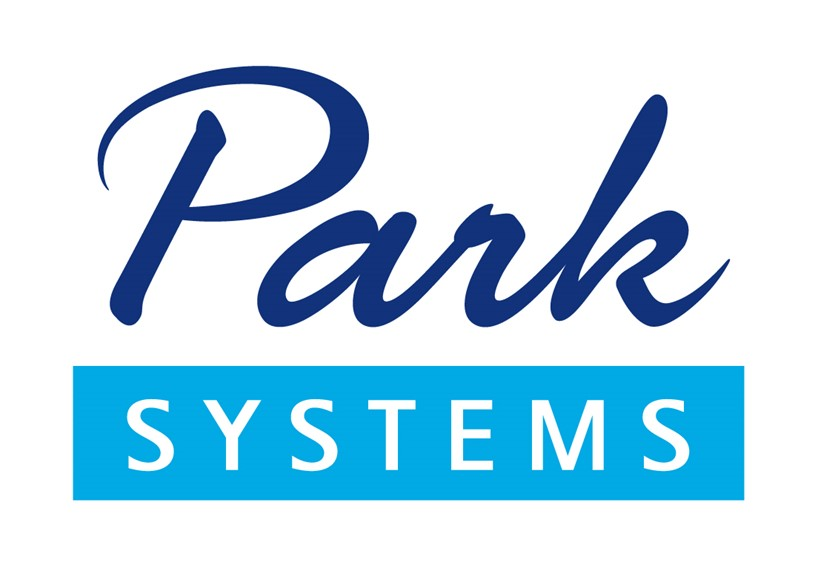
- Native name: 파크시스템스 주식회사
- Formerly: PSIA (Korean: 피에스아이에이)
- Company type: Public
- Traded as: KRX: 140860
- Founded: April 7, 1997; 29 years ago
- Founder: Sang-il Park
- Headquarters: 109 Gwanggyo-ro, Yeongtong-gu, Suwon-si, Gyeonggi-do, South Korea
- Area served: Worldwide
- Key people: Sang-il Park (chairman and CEO)
- Products: Atomic Force Microscope (AFM); Imaging spectroscopic ellipsometer (ISE); Active vibration isolation table (AVI); Digital holographic microscope (DHM)
- Revenue: ▲KRW ₩175,059,840,000 (FY 2024)
- Net income: ▲KRW ₩42,803,660,000 (FY 2024)
- Number of employees: 545 (including subsidiaries) (FY 2024)
- Website: www.parksystems.com

Park Systems Corp. (Korean: 파크시스템스 주식회사) is a South Korean manufacturer of scientific instruments. Park Systems is best known for its atomic force microscopes (AFM). The company is headquartered in Suwon, Gyeonggi Province, with branch offices in the United States, Japan, Singapore, Taiwan, Germany, and Switzerland.

Park Systems was originally established as PSIA (Korean: 피에스아이에이) on April 7, 1997. The company changed its name to Park Systems in 2007.

== History ==
=== Pre-foundation ===
Dr. Sang-il Park, the founder of Park Systems, was a doctoral student of Professor Calvin Quate at Stanford University. In 1986, while Park was working in Quate’s lab, Quate, Gerd Binnig, and Christoph Gerber achieved the first experimental implementation of atomic force microscopy (AFM). After graduating from Stanford, Dr. Park founded Park Scientific Instruments (PSI) in 1988, a Silicon Valley manufacturer of atomic force microscopes. Dr. Park returned to South Korea in 1997 after selling PSI to Thermo Electron.

=== Company formation and early days ===
On April 7, 1997, PSIA was founded by Sang-il Park. The "A" in PSIA stood for "Advanced," reflecting the company's goal of developing more advanced technology than PSI. In its early days, PSIA relied on selling imported PSI products, but soon began developing and manufacturing industrial atomic force microscopes on its own. In 2002, PSIA released XE-100, the first research AFM in Korea. In 2006, PSIA moved its headquarters to Korea Advanced Nano Fab Center (KANC; Korean: 한국나노기술원).

=== After changing name to Park Systems ===
On April 6, 2007, PSIA changed its name to Park Systems, following its tenth anniversary. On March 23, 2015, Park Systems and IMEC launched a joint development project (JDP) to develop industrial AFM technology for semiconductor manufacturing. Later that year, on December 17, Park Systems went public on the KOSDAQ stock exchange under the ticker symbol KRX: 140860. On February 17, 2020, the company launched a second joint development project with IMEC.

On September 6, 2022, Park Systems announced its acquisition of Accurion GmbH, a German manufacturer of imaging spectroscopic ellipsometers and active vibration isolation tables. In early 2025, Park Systems acquired Lyncée Tec, a Swiss manufacturer of digital holographic microscopes.

== Technology ==
Park Systems' AFM products use a decoupled flexure scanner architecture, in which the XY scanner moves the sample horizontally while a separate Z scanner moves the probe vertically.

The company's AFMs can operate in non-contact mode, marketed as "True Non-Contact," in which the probe tip does not contact the sample surface.

In 2010, the company's industrial AFM technology was designated as a National Core Technology by the South Korean government.

== Products ==
Park Systems produces atomic force microscopes (AFM), imaging spectroscopic ellipsometers (ISE), active vibration isolation (AVI) tables, and digital holographic microscopes (DHM).
