= SKS (brand) =

Luxury kitchen appliance brand

- Type: Subsidiary
- Industry: Kitchen appliances
- Founded: 2016; 10 years ago
- Headquarters: Englewood Cliffs, New Jersey, United States
- Area served: United States, Canada, Mexico, Italy, UK, Korea
- Products: Ranges, wall ovens, cooktops, refrigeration, microwaves, wine refrigerators, dishwashers, ventilation
- Brands: SKS
- Parent: LG Electronics

SKS (formerly Signature Kitchen Suite) is a luxury built-in kitchen appliance brand, owned by LG Electronics. The brand was introduced in 2016 at the National Kitchen & Bath Association's Kitchen & Bath Industry Show (KBIS) in Las Vegas, Nevada. In February 2025, LG rebranded Signature Kitchen Suite to SKS at KBIS 2025. The brand's US headquarters are in Englewood Cliffs, New Jersey.

== History ==
SKS was introduced by LG Electronics in January 2016 as its luxury built-in kitchen appliance brand. In early 2019, LG opened its first SKS appliance showroom for trade professionals, including architects, interior designers, general contractors and appliance retailers, called the "Experience & Design Center," in Napa, California. In 2023, SKS opened its second showroom to trade professionals in Englewood Cliffs, New Jersey, inside LG's North American headquarters, called the "Skyline Showroom."

At KBIS 2025, LG announced that the brand name would be shortened to SKS. SKS also debuted new branding and products at the same show, including a 36-inch induction cooktop, the first released in industry. In November 2025, SKS opened its first showroom open to consumers in Chicago, at the Merchandise Mart.

== Products ==
SKS produces several categories of built-in kitchen appliances. Its cooking products include professional-grade ranges, wall ovens, cooktops, microwave ovens and kitchen ventilation products, like kitchen hoods. Its refrigeration offerings consist of French door, column (refrigerator and freezer) and under-counter refrigerators and wine-storage appliances. The brand also manufactures built-in dishwashers.

In 2018, SKS introduced a professional-style range with an integrated sous vide cooking module, a first in the industry. In 2020, SKS expanded the sous vide module to four cooktops and wall ovens. In 2024, SKS released a series of 30-inch combination, single and double wall ovens with AI-powered internal cameras, which could identify food in the oven and automatically suggest the proper cooking time and temperature, as well as share a live feed of the oven cavity via LG's ThinQ mobile app. As of November 2025, all SKS appliances are Wi-Fi enabled and connect to the ThinQ app for remote control and diagnostics.

== Awards ==
In 2018, SKS received a Red Dot Design Award for its 48-inch dual-fuel cooktop. In 2021, SKS won best home technology and best indoor product awards at KBIS for its 36-inch cooktop. In 2023, the brand's 48-inch built-in French door refrigerator won awards from KBIS (Gold), American women's magazine Good Housekeeping (Best Kitchen Gear) and Good Design. At the 2024 CES Innovation Awards, a part of the CES trade show (formerly known as the Consumer Electronics Show), the brand was named an honoree for its 30-inch "combi" (or combination) wall oven and 30-inch induction cooktop. In 2024, American news magazine Time listed the combination wall oven with an AI camera among its "Best Inventions of 2024." In 2025, SKS received a Red Dot Design Award for its 36-inch induction range.
