= CIMAC =

Trade association

CIMAC: Conseil International des Machines à Combustion
- Formation: 1950
- Type: Industry Trade Group
- Headquarters: Frankfurt, Germany
- Members: approx. 500 / 15 associations, 16 enterprises
- Key people: Rick Boom (President); Peter Müller-Baum (Secretary General)
- Website: www.cimac.com

CIMAC provides a forum for technical interchange with all parties interested in piston engines, gas turbine systems, non-shaftline propulsion systems, automation and controls, system integration and digitalisation solutions. The akronym originates from its French name: Conseil International des Machines à Combustion. CIMAC is a registered association that represents the worldwide interests of the industry in power, drives and propulsion as an umbrella association in dealings with regulatory authorities and standardization bodies. CIMAC was founded in Paris in 1950 and moved its secretariat from London to Frankfurt in 1996. CIMAC is made up of approximately 500 national associations and large companies from 27 countries in America, Asia and Europe. In addition to manufacturers of large engines and their suppliers, its members also include users of large engines (including shipowners, power plant operators, railway operators), fuel and lubricant manufacturers, universities and development service providers. In July 2024, CIMAC was officially granted consultative status with the International Maritime Organization (IMO).

== Organizational structure ==
The CIMAC Board prepares decisions which must be approved by the CIMAC Council. The CIMAC Council is composed of delegates from the 15 National Members Associations (NMAs) and 18 direct corporate members. This body also elects the President of CIMAC, who has been elected every 3 years since 1993. Below the management there are 12 permanent working groups which deal with questions and developments in the various areas of the large engine industry and develop position papers, guidelines and technical recommendations. In addition, there is a strategy group greenhouse gas as well as a strategy group digitalization. In 2025, for example, the Working Group System Integration issued a guideline on digital twins in the maritime industry. The technical papers produced by the CIMAC working groups are used by organisations such as the International Association of Classification Societies (IACS), the UN International Maritime Organization (IMO) and others in matters of standardisation. The results of the working groups are regularly presented at international seminars, workshops and the CIMAC Congress.

== Congress ==
The central platform for exchange within the large engines industry is the CIMAC Congress. It takes place every 3 years on different continents and at different locations. The latest developments in drive technologies are presented and discussed at the congress. The last CIMAC Congress was held in Vancouver in 2019 and three years earlier in Helsinki. The next CIMAC Congress was scheduled for 2022 in Busan, Korea, but had to be postponed to 2023 due to the COVID-19 pandemic. It took place in May 2023. The last Congress took place in May 2025 in Zurich/Switzerland The next Congress is schedulded for 2028 in Antwerp/Belgium

== History ==
CIMAC was founded in 1950. The acronym CIMAC is derived from the French Congrès International des Moteurs A Combustion Interne in adaptation to the place of foundation Paris. In the years following the end of the World War II, reconstruction and growth were high on the agenda of many countries. The demand for energy was correspondingly high. The internal combustion engine was regarded as a central component in providing the necessary energy. Technical developments were needed, but nobody knew exactly who in the world was working on what. CIMAC was therefore founded as a forum for greater transparency and mutual exchange in the industry. CIMAC has in spring 2024 changed its name slightly. The well-known word mark CIMAC, which has been used from the outset, has been retained, but the subsequent explanation “International Council on Combustion Engines” has been dropped. The reason is easy to understand: Although combustion engines are still the core element, in the younger past they have increasingly developed into integral parts of functional systems. CIMAC has taken this into account and widened the scope. Accordingly, CIMAC is the leading global non-profit association promoting the development of ship propulsion, train drive and power generation. The association consists of National Member Associations and Corporate Members in America, Asia and Europe. CIMAC provides a forum for technical interchange with all parties interested in piston engines, gas turbine systems, non-shaftline propulsion systems, automation and controls, system integration and digitalization solutions.

== Presidents ==
Since 1951 CIMAC has had 24 presidents:

No.	Name	Country	From	Until
1	Paul C. Tharlet	France	May 1951	June 1957
2	Haakon Andresen	Denmark	June 1957	Oct 1961
3	Roberto de Pieri	Italy	Oct 1961	Aug 1964
4	Max Zwicky	Switzerland	Dec 1964	Oct 1969
5	Siegfried Meurer	Germany	Oct 1969	Oct 1973
6	Waheeb Rizk	Great Britain	Oct 1973	Nov 1977
7	Alberto Guglielmotti	Italy	Nov 1977	Nov 1981
8	Lars Th. Collin	Sweden	Nov 1981	Nov 1983
9	Cecil C.J. French	Great Britain	Nov 1983	Nov 1985
10	Masutaro Shibata	Japan	Nov 1985	Nov 1987
11	Meinrad K. Eberle	Switzerland	Nov 1987	Nov 1989
12	Hans H. Wesselo	The Netherlands	Nov 1989	Nov 1991
13	Helmut W.K. Maghon	Germany	Nov 1991	Nov 1993
14	Georg Lustgarten	Switzerland	Nov 1993	Nov 1995
15	Peter S. Pedersen	Denmark	Nov 1995	May 1998
16	Stephan G. Dexter	Austria	May 1998	May 2001
17	Nikolaos P. Kyrtatos	Greece	May 2001	May 2004
18	Matti E. Kleimola	Finland	May 2004	May 2007
19	Karl Wojik	Austria	May 2007	May 2010
20	Yasuhiro Itoh	Japan	May 2010	May 2013
21	Christoph Teetz	Germany	May 2013	June 2016
22	Klaus Heim	Italy	June 2016	June 2019
23	Donghan Jin	China	June 2019	June 2023
24	Rick Boom	Netherlands	June 2023	
