= Young Scientist Award =

South Korean award

- Country: South Korea
- Presented by: Korean Academy of Science and Technology
- First award: 1997
- Website: Korean Academy of Science and Technology

- Young Scientist Award
- Hangul: 젊은과학자상
- Hanja: 젊은科學者賞
- RR: Jeolmeun gwahakjasang
- MR: Chŏlmŭn kwahakchasang

The Young Scientist Award is a Korean award for young scientists under the age of 40 with research and development achievements in the natural sciences and engineering fields. Four recipients are selected on an annual basis. While the award is organized by the Korean Academy of Science and Technology, it is given on behalf of the president of Korea, and comes with prize money of initially KRW 30 million, and later KRW 50 million. Candidates for the award must be Korean or working within Korea at a university or research institute. The award is presented to natural science researchers in even-numbered years and engineering in odd-numbered years.

Awards are given in four categories. Within natural science these categories are mathematics, physics, chemistry, and life science, accordingly. Within engineering, category 1 is electricity, electronics, computers, and information and communications technology; category 2 is machinery, metals, ceramics, aviation, shipbuilding, industrial engineering, and electronic materials; category 3 is chemical engineering, food, polymers, textiles, biotechnology, and industrial chemistry; and category 4 is energy, architecture, civil engineering, environment, resources, and urban engineering.

Many of the winners were affiliated with SKY, KAIST, or POSTECH at the time of the award and later frequently work for KAIST or the Institute for Basic Science.

== Recipients ==
| Year | Category 1 | Category 2 | Category 3 | Category 4 |
|---|---|---|---|---|
| 1997 | Seo Daesik (서대식); Soongsil University | Choe Haecheon (최해천); Seoul National University | Lee Sangyeop (이상엽); KAIST | Bak Jongmun (박종문); POSTECH |
| 1998 | Gang Seokjin (강석진); Seoul National University | An Gyeongwon (안경원); KAIST | Cho Minhaeng (조민행); Korea University | Jo Yunje (조윤제); Korea Institute of Science and Technology |
| 1999 | Song Ikho (송익호); KAIST | Lee Hyeokmo (이혁모); KAIST | Kim Jaejeong (김재정); Seoul National University | – |
| 2000 | Oh Yong-Geun (오용근); Korea Institute for Advanced Study | Lee Gyeongjin (이경진); Korea University | Nam Wonu (남원우); Ewha Womans University | Kim Jaeseop (김재섭); KAIST |
| 2001 | Lee Byeongho (이병호); Seoul National University | Bang Hyochung (방효충); KAIST | Hyeon Taeghwan (현택환); Seoul National University | Kim Dong-soo (김동수); KAIST |
| 2002 | Kim Beomsik (김범식); POSTECH | Kim Daesik (김대식); Seoul National University | Cheon Jinwoo (천진우); Yonsei University | An Gwangseok (안광석); Korea University |
| 2003 | Bak Namgyu (박남규); Seoul National University | Hwang Cheolseong (황철성); Seoul National University | Seong Yeongeun (성영은); Gwangju Institute of Science and Technology | Lee Jaehong (이재홍); Sejong University |
| 2004 | Byeon Jaehyeong (변재형); POSTECH | Shin Junghun (신중훈); KAIST | Choe Inseong (최인성); KAIST | Kim Eunjoon (김은준); KAIST |
| 2005 | Gwon Yeongu (권영우); Seoul National University | Lee Jeonghun (이정훈); Seoul National University | – | Choe Wonyong (최원용); POSTECH |
| 2006 | Kim Ingang (김인강); Seoul National University | Bak Dongsu (박동수); University of Seoul | Ihee Hyotcherl (이효철); KAIST | Kim V. Narry (김빛내리); Seoul National University |
| 2007 | Choe Seonghyeon (최성현); Seoul National University | Gang Jeonggu (강정구); KAIST | Lee Taeu (이태우); Samsung Advanced Institute of Technology (삼성종합기술원) | Son Hun (손훈); KAIST |
| 2008 | Kim Yeonghun (김영훈); Seoul National University | Kang Seongjun (강성준); Korea Research Institute of Standards and Science | Choe Huicheol (최희철); POSTECH | Baek Sung-hee (백성희); Seoul National University |
| 2009 | Jo Gwanghyeon (조광현); KAIST | Seo Gapyang (posthumous) (서갑양); Seoul National University | Kim Sanguk (김상욱); KAIST | Jo Gyechun (조계춘); KAIST |
| 2010 | Ha Seungyeol (하승열); Seoul National University | Choe Seokbong (최석봉); Seoul National University | Bak Seungbeom (박승범); Seoul National University | Kim Yungi (김윤기); Korea University |
| 2011 | Kwon Sunghoon (권성훈); Seoul National University | An Jonghyeon (안종현); Sungkyunkwan University | Jeong Unryong (정운룡); Yonsei University | Kim Sumin (김수민); Soongsil University |
| 2012 | Oum Sang-il (엄상일); KAIST | Choe Gyeongsu (최경수); Korea Institute of Science and Technology | Nam Jwamin (남좌민); Seoul National University | Cho Nam Hyuk (조남혁); Seoul National University |
| 2013 | Bak Jeonguk (박정욱); Yonsei University | Gang Giseok (강기석); Seoul National University | Bak Sujin (박수진); UNIST | Yun Taeseop (윤태섭); Yonsei University |
| 2014 | Hyeon Donghun (현동훈); POSTECH | Jo Gyeongnam (조경남); Korea Institute of Geoscience and Mineral Resources | Choe Taerim (최태림); Seoul National University | Kim Hyeongbeom (김형범); Hanyang University |
| 2015 | Kim Seonguk (김선국); Kyung Hee University | Jeon Seoku (전석우); KAIST | Choe Janguk (최장욱); UNIST | Kim Donghun (김동훈); Inha University |
| 2016 | Oh Seongjin (오성진); Korea Institute for Advanced Study | Lee Seongjae (이성재); Korea Institute for Advanced Study | Bak Munjeong (박문정); POSTECH | Go Jaewon (고재원); Yonsei University |
| 2017 | An Chungi (안춘기); Korea University | Nam Gitae (남기태); Seoul National University | Kim Daehyeong (김대형); Seoul National University | An Yungyu (안윤규); Sejong University |
| 2018 | Lee Jiun (이지운); KAIST | Yu Seonghun (우성훈); Thomas J. Watson Research Center | Byeon Hyeryeong (변혜령); KAIST | Kim Ho Min (김호민); KAIST |
| 2019 | Kim Sinhyeon (김신현); KAIST | Yu Woojong (유우종); Sungkyunkwan University | Noh Junseok (노준석); POSTECH | Noh Junhong (노준홍); Korea University |
| 2020 | Seo Inseok (서인석); Seoul National University | Hahm Yugeun (함유근); Chonnam National University | Bak Jeongwon (박정원); Seoul National University | Ju Yeongseok (주영석); Korea Science Academy of KAIST |
| 2021 | Lee Hyeongu (이현구); Sookmyung Women's University | Kim Yeongjin (김영진); KAIST | Choe Mingi (최민기); KAIST | Ryu Duyeol (류두열); Hanyang University |
| 2022 | Choe Gyeongsu (최경수); Korea Institute for Advanced Study | Lee Gilho (이길호); POSTECH | Hahn Sungyu (한순규); KAIST | Jeong Chungwon (정충원); SNU |
| 2023 | Kang Jihyeong (강지형); KAIST | Im Jongu (임종우); SNU | Bak Seongjun (박성준); KAIST | Kim Minjin (김민진); Korea Institute of Energy Research (KIER) |
| 2024 | Kang Jeong-soo (강정수); Seoul National University | Lee Seung-joo (이승주); Institute for Basic Science | Choi Chang-hyeok (최창혁); POSTECH | Kim Yu-sik (김유식); KAIST |
