= Joseph Irudayaraj =

American engineer and chemist (b. 1961)

Joseph Maria Kumar Irudayaraj (born 1961) is an American engineer and chemist; he is a professor of bioengineering at University of Illinois at Urbana Champaign. He is active in the field of bionanotechnology, molecular sensing and drug discovery core.

== Awards ==
- College of Engineering Research Excellence Award, Purdue University (2015)

== Web-sources ==
- "Joseph Irudayaraj: Deputy Dir of Bindley and Professor, Agricultural & Biological Engineering". Purdue University.
- "Joseph Maria Kumar Irudayaraj: Founder Professor in Bioengineering, Associate Head of Graduate Programs". Bioengineering: University of Illinois at Urbana-Champaign.
