= Nanophotonics (journal) =

- Discipline: Nanotechnology
- Language: English
- Edited by: Stefan Maier

Publication details
- History: 2012–present
- Publisher: Walter de Gruyter / Science Wise Publishing
- Frequency: 16/year
- Open access: Yes
- License: CC BY
- Impact factor: 6.6 (2023)

Standard abbreviations
- ISO 4: Nanophotonics

Indexing
- ISSN: 2192-8614

Links
- Journal homepage; Official website

Nanophotonics is a peer-reviewed open access scientific journal published by De Gruyter and Science Wise Publishing. It covers recent international research results, specific developments, and novel applications in the field of nanophotonics, such as carbon nanotubes, nano metal particles, nanocrystals, semiconductor nanodots, photonic crystals, tissue, and DNA. Its editor-in-chief is Stefan Maier (LMU Munich) and founding editor is Federico Capasso (Harvard University).

== History ==
In 2010, Nanophotonics was initiated by founding editor Federico Capasso and publishing editor Dennis Couwenberg. The first issue was published in 2012.

== Abstracting and indexing ==
The journal is abstracted and indexed in:

- Astrophysics Data System
- Chemical Abstracts Service
- Directory of Open Access Journals
- EBSCO
- J-Gate
- ProQuest
- ReadCube
- SCImago
- Scopus
- Ulrich's Periodicals Directory
- Web of Science
- WorldCat

According to the Journal Citation Reports, the journal has a 2024 impact factor of 6.6.
