= National Academy of Engineering of Korea =

South Korean nonprofit

- Formation: April 1996; 30 years ago
- Type: NGO
- Headquarters: Seoul, Gangnam-gu, Yeoksam-dong 701-7, Korea Technology Center, 15th floor
- Coordinates: 37.5032937°N 127.0437705°E
- Members: 1,359
- Official language: Korean
- Chairman: Kim Kinam
- President: Kwon Oh-Kyong
- Website: naek.or.kr

- National Academy of Engineering of Korea
- Hangul: 한국공학한림원
- Hanja: 韓國工學翰林院
- RR: Hanguk gonghak hallimwon
- MR: Han'guk konghak hallimwŏn

The National Academy of Engineering of Korea (NAEK; Korean: 한국공학한림원) is a South Korean nonprofit, non-governmental organization founded to support engineering and technology development in academia, industry, and national institutions; and to contribute to the development and sustainable development of engineering technology through academic research. The Academy was founded in 1996 in accordance with Article 40 of the Industrial Technology Innovation Promotion Act.

== History ==
The Korean Association for Engineering Deans petitioned the government to establish the National Academy of Engineering of Korea in December 1993. The Association was included in the Industrial Technology Innovation Promotion Act and then approved by the Ministry of Industry and Energy. The Board of Directors, chairman, and initial members were determined in April 1996 followed by the first president two months later.

== Objectives ==
There are four stated objectives of the National Academy of Engineering of Korea:

- Conduct research and propose policies in regards to engineering technologies
- Strengthen international activities of engineering technologies through international network of the International Council of Academies of Engineering and Technological Sciences (CAETS), the East Asia Round Table Meetings, etc.
- Create and promote engineering culture
- Acknowledge and honor engineers who brought about innovation for society

== Membership ==
Membership is divided into members, associate members, emeritus members, and foreign members both in academia and the private sector. Engineering divisions include electrical and electronic engineering; mechanical engineering; architectural, civil and environmental engineering; chemical and biological engineering; material and energy engineering; technology, management and policy; computer science and engineering; and biomedical engineering.

== Leadership ==
=== Chairmen ===
- Rieh Chong Hun (April 1996–September 1998)
- Yun Jong Yong (September 1998–February 2005)
- Huh Chin Gyu (February 2005–June 2015)
- Kwon Oh Joon (June 2015–June 2015)
- Kim Kinam (June 2019–current)

=== Presidents ===
- Lee Ki Jun (June 1996–January 2005)
- Yun Jong Yong (January 2005–December 2010)
- Kim Doh-Yeon (December 2010–June 2011)
- Chung Joon-yang (June 2011–January 2015)
- Oh Young Ho (January 2015–January 2017)
- Kwon Oh-Kyong (January 2017–current)

== Awards ==
The NAEK Award was started in 1996 to honor engineers who have made significant contributions to the development of the engineering and technology field at universities, institutions, and industries. It is awarded annually to one or formerly two recipients for the primary award and also two young engineers. Other awards include the Iljin Award, Haedong Award and Wonik Award.
