= Elsword =

2007 video game

- Developer: KOG Studios
- Publishers: KOR: Nexon; TW: Gamania; HK: Gamania; JP: NHN Japan; NA: KOG Games; CHN: Giant Interactive; THA: PlayPark; EU: Gameforge
- Platform: Microsoft Windows
- Release: KOR: December 27, 2007; TW: October 23, 2009; HK: November 9, 2009; JP: March 17, 2010; NA: March 23, 2011; CHN: December 9, 2011; THA: October 18, 2012; EU: July 24, 2013; PHL: October 9, 2013
- Genres: Fantasy, action, MMORPG
- Mode: Multiplayer

Elsword (Korean: 엘소드) is a free-to-play, 2.5D action MMORPG developed by the South Korean company KOG Studios. It features real-time action gameplay and includes both player vs. environment and player vs. player modes. There are fifteen playable characters within the game, each with unique backstories and distinct abilities. While playing the game is free, some items and costumes can be purchased through an in-game "Item Mall" using real currency. The game was originally made with the intention of being the spiritual successor to Grand Chase by upgrading the graphics from 2D to 2.5D.

== Gameplay ==
Elsword features skill-based action gameplay combined with role-playing elements and community features typical of an MMORPG, such as guilds, chat, and item trading. Gameplay can be controlled using either a keyboard and mouse or a gamepad. It is based on arcade Beat 'em ups, and require the player to properly execute combos within the specific range of their character much akin to a fighting game, mixing the elements to provide a side-scrolling beat 'em up fighter.

=== Characters ===
In the world of Elsword, player are able to choose classes by choosing a character, each with their own backgrounds and characteristics. Each character is able to choose from four job paths, each with their own fighting mode and personalities. There are currently fifteen playable characters players can choose from.

As of August 2025, all classes can advance to the "Transcendence mode" where they gain two new passives, one active, and three special actives starting from level 70, and two additional skill slots. Transcendence is also considered as a third job advancement, despite being a same class.

When characters achieve level 99 and having Transcended, they can advance to 3rd job, by either purchasing an item from the mall (this applies to all jobs) or completing the quest provided by an NPC. The quest is the same across classes and characters.

Once characters achieve 3rd job and then enter Rigomor by completing the final Varnimyr region dungeon, they can advance to Master Class, by either purchasing an item from the mall (this applies to all jobs) or completing the quest provided by an El Master NPC. The quest is the same across all characters and classes.

=== Skills ===
Different types of skills are automatically unlocked as a player levels up. The player can also choose skill traits for a skill (only Special Active, Active, and Buff), which grants additional buff like damage increase, mana usage decrease, and anti-mana break skill, with some cost, a sacrifice like cool down skill or mana usage increase.

Elsword's skills except Passives and Hyper Actives are also divided into four types: Flexibility (Active skills), Tenacity (50~120MP), Strength (150~200MP), and Bravery (250~300MP).

- Passive – an always-on effect without any mana cost, as long as the conditions are met. There are many types of Passives, e.g. increases attack or defense, gives special effects, or enhances other skills.
- Active – requires some mana to activate; mana cost and cooldown is very low but does not do significant damage. Actives may damage an opponent, may help the player's allies, or even restore health or mana. Mana cost ranges from 0~100, and cooldown ranges from 0~65 and can be modified using other skills.
- Buff – gives the player and allies a special effect or a power boost for a limited time when activated. Its activation can be easily interrupted, so it has a very short cooldown. There are also skills called De-Buff Skills that weaken an enemy for a short time. Mana cost ranges from 50~80, cooldown ranges from 10~30, and buff duration ranges from 3~100.
- Special Active – has a special skill image when activated. The damage is relatively powerful, so it has a very high mana cost. Most Special Actives cannot be used in a combo, but there are some that can. Special Actives have a very low chance of being interrupted as character gained invincibility frame, but if it is, its mana will not be refunded and its cooldown will start. Mana cost ranges from 35~300 and cooldown ranges from 5~30
- Locked Skills – require completing a quest to be unlocked. After completing the quest, Camilla gives the player a skill unlocking book that can unlock a certain type of Locked Skill. Due to this downside, they are usually stronger than most skills. Once unlocked, it can become a Passive, Active or a Special Active. There are four locked skills for every character: Basic, Intermediate, Advanced and Expert, unlocked at level 30, 40, 45, and 60, respectively. The higher the Seal Level, the harder it is to unlock.
- Chain Skill – Exclusively for Ara, she is able to 'cancel' a skill and resume it with another skill. A chain skill has four skills in it. If the skill succeeds, she will perform the fifth skill, which is not available in her skill tree. Royal Guard and Noblesse are also able to use Chain Skill, linked a skill each performed by Lu and Ciel, and resume it by performing a Combination Skill.
- Combination Skill – only available for Lu/Ciel. It is a skill that utilizes them both to do a strong attack. It does not require any mana, but it requires a full Switch Gauge and depletes it completely. There is also no cooldown, as it takes a long time to gain full Switch Gauge.
- Hyper Actives – They are locked skills and can be unlocked at level 65 and the second one after Third Job Advancement at level 99. Hyper Actives may decrease an enemy player's life to half or even cause a One-Hit Kill when landed successfully. They require 300 MP to use and have a 180-second cooldown. Additionally, Hyper Actives use up one or more El Essence, which can be obtained from El stones (one elemental El Shard yields three El Essences). The 180 second requirement can be lowered down by 60 seconds (leaving 120-seconds) with the usage of Concentrated El Essence. These have their own special skill slot, meaning they can be equipped alongside the 10 normal skill tiers without overlapping.
- Master Skills – This is a single, evolving skill that is only usable by players at the Master Class advancement. It starts out at Stage 1 and can be evolved through chain quests to a Stage 4 counterpart. They cost (100 x Stage Level) Mana per usage and feature their own unique skill cut-ins. These have their own special skill slot, meaning they can be equipped alongside the 10 normal skill tiers without overlapping.

=== Background ===
Players traverse the land of Elrios, defeating enemies and leveling-up to unlock new job classes and skills. As players explore the world, they travel to eighteen unique regions, most containing a "hub" town and around six dungeons. In towns, players can receive quests from NPCs, purchase items, and interact with other players. Dungeons are instanced, usually offering co-op play for up to four players in general dungeons, six players in raids, and eight players split into two parties of four in the new striker raids. Some dungeons feature branching paths, light puzzle-solving, and interactive elements such as collapsing buildings. The game also features a number of special dungeons. Presently, there is a total of 91 different levels.

There are fourteen different playable characters as of March 2023, each with four different job class paths that can be chosen starting at level 15. Each job class path offers specialization in a different play style along with unique skills.

=== PVP ===
Player vs. player (PvP) takes place in a special sparring arena designed for different numbers of players. Up to eight players can brawl at the same time. Both "survival" (i.e. everyone vs. everyone) and "team" modes are available, with team battles supporting up to 4 vs. 4. Servers have the option to fight 1 vs. 1, 2 vs. 2, and 3 vs. 3 matches. In the Korean version of Elsword, 2 vs. 2 was removed due to its unpopularity. This option was also removed later in the North American and European version, but was re-installed on July 14, 2014 for the North American version and on July 30, 2014 for the European version.

== Development and release ==
Elsword was developed by KOG Studios. Open beta was launched in South Korea on 27 December 2007.

Elsword was originally a reboot of Grand Chase, another MMORPG created by KOG Studios. The two shared many similarities, such as Elsword, Aisha, and Rena, formerly named Elesis, Arme, and Lire, respectively, who were a few of the main characters of Grand Chase. The original Elesis was also eventually released. The obvious identical traits were scrapped when Elsword came out of beta testing, as the two games were hosted by different companies. However, there are many similarities between the two games, such as similar skill systems, names, character stories, traits, and monsters.

In 2010, KOG Studios partnered with Philippine company Level Up! Games, the publisher of Grand Chase in South America, to found Kill3r Combo, a subsidiary company headquartered in Irvine, California, with the objective of bringing KOG's games to North America. Their first game was Elsword, which began open beta testing in North America on April 27, 2011, and released on July 2, 2014. The Steam version of the game was released on July 24, 2013, after players voted for it through Steam Greenlight.

== Server merge ==
As of December 4, 2015 Elsword servers for the Philippines, Indonesia and India have now been merged into the Elsword International Server, which is published by KOG Games.

== Reception ==
Although Elsword received some criticism for pay to win systems, the game was generally well-received, and peaked with 2,500 active players on Steam in August 2013.

In 2008, reviewing the open beta version, ThisIsGame criticized the weak character customization system and graphical bugs.

The concurrent player number reached 13,000 on 27 December 2008, the service's first anniversary.

== Media ==
=== Manhwa ===
There are a series of manhwa based on the game, published by Korean publisher Haksan Culture Company in a series of magazines called ElType. The magazines are published by KOG Studios, the creators of Elsword. They involve a main story in each magazine with short comic gags at the beginning and end. After the first four volumes were released, the series went on a hiatus due to the main artist of Elsword leaving. KOG later created a short series of manhwas different from ElType, involving Chung and his transformation into his second job advancement. During the release of Ara, ElType was rebooted with a new team of artists, entitled ElType Season 2. The first volume introduced Ara and her lore, along with numerous different short comics, each illustrated by several different artists. Add was later featured in Eltype Season 3.

=== Official guidebook ===
An official guide was released on October 8, 2010.

=== Japanese-style webcomic ===
In 2014, an Elsword manga-style webcomic was released in Brazilian territory, exclusive to the website. It was written by Fábio Yabu, responsible for the already established series Combo Rangers, and is freely available. The webcomic is aimed at children. There are twelve volumes of the webcomic and one special volume.

There is a seven-page mini manga about Lu and Ciel.

=== Animation ===
An animation version of the game titled Elsword: El Lady adapts the story from Hamel to Lanox. DR Movie produced the series while NZ wrote the story. The series is scheduled to have 12 episodes, each 12 minutes long. The first episode released on a screening event on December 10, 2016, following the online release 3 days after. The original cast from the game voiced their original character with the exception of Aisha.

=== Light novel ===
A light novel series focuses on Add, set in an alternate reality from the game. The story is written by NZ and illustrated by Takoman, and is titled Elsword: Time Trouble. The first volume was released on August 7, 2015. So far, eight volumes were released. Each comes with an in-game accessory.
