= Hero: 108 =

- Genre: Action; Adventure; Science fantasy Comedy drama
- Created by: Yang-Ming Tarng
- Written by: Kent Redeker; Thomas Pugsley; Greg Klein; Nicole Dubuc; John Tellegen
- Directed by: Trevor Wall; Pongo Kuo
- Voices of: Eric Bauza; Ian James Corlett; Andrew Francis; Brian Drummond; Scott McNeil; Adrian Petriw; Kelly Sheridan; Tabitha St. Germain
- Narrated by: Ian James Corlett
- Theme music composer: John McPhillips
- Composer: John McPhillips
- Countries of origin: United States; Taiwan; Ireland; China; United Kingdom; Canada
- Original language: English
- No. of seasons: 2
- No. of episodes: 52 (104 segments) (list of episodes)

Production
- Executive producers: Mike Young Liz Young Albert Liu Rita Street Paul Cummins Bill Schultz (season 1) Nicolas Atlan (season 2); For Cartoon Network Europe: Daniel Lennard Suzanne Berman
- Producers: Lolee Aries; Sanvy Hsieh; Siobhán Ní Ghadhra; Zhang Wenqi (season 1); Ju Weiqin (season 2)
- Running time: 22 minutes (11 minutes per segment)
- Production companies: MoonScoop Entertainment (Note: Credited as Mike Young Productions and Taffy Entertainment for season 1.); Gamania Entertainment Digital Co., Ltd. Hong Ying Anime Entertainment Limited; Telegael Teoranta Limited

Original release
- Network: Cartoon Network
- Release: 1 March 2010 – 9 July 2012

Hero: 108 is an animated television series created by Yang-Ming Tarng for Cartoon Network Europe. It was broadcast on Cartoon Network in the United States and aired on the Cartoon Network international channels elsewhere. The series is co-produced by MoonScoop Entertainment, Gamania, Hong Ying Animation and Telegael Teoranta for Cartoon Network Europe. It premiered on 1 March 2010.

The show was renewed for another season, which began airing on 7 May 2012, on Cartoon Network (Russia and Southeastern Europe), UK, April 30 on Cartoon Network Too, and on Cartoon Network in the United States on 4 June 2012. The series ended its run on 9 July 2012.

== Synopsis ==
Many years ago in the Hidden Kingdom, animals and humans lived in perfect harmony until an evil trickster named HighRoller arrived and fooled the animals into thinking humans were their enemies. Chaos reigned in the Hidden Kingdom until Commander ApeTrully formed a task force called Big Green to reunite the animals and humans while fighting the forces of HighRoller and the Zebra Brothers.

The storyline in a typical episode follows a formula, although the formula varies and several episodes depart from it: Commander ApeTrully goes on a mission to the castle of an animal kingdom to make peace and ask its inhabitants to join Big Green, bringing a gift of gold as a token of goodwill. The animals generally dismiss the gift, and usually capture ApeTrully who calls for help from First Squad. Members of First Squad (usually everyone except Mr. No Hands, who does come along on occasion) deploy by descending through a maze of tubes and landing on turtles fitted with tank treads, and then are launched through a tunnel and out over the water. When they arrive where ApeTrully is being held, a battle or contest ensues, during which special talents or abilities of the animals are revealed, often something based on their nature. After the battle or contest, the animals usually concede to First Squad's skills saying through translation by ApeTrully (unless the animal rulers can talk) that they would be honored to join Big Green. After joining, the animals often are assigned a particular duty at Big Green based on their demonstrated skills, which may help solve a problem introduced in a subplot.

The show is very loosely based on the ancient Chinese novel Water Margin focusing on the exploits of First Squad and Second Squad.

== Episodes ==
Season	Episodes	Segments	Originally released	
Season	Episodes	Segments	First released	Last released
1	26	52	March 1, 2010	April 5, 2010
2	26	52	May 6, 2012	June 8, 2012

== Characters ==
=== Big Green ===
Big Green is a peacemaking force with goals to restore peace between the humans and animals:

- Commander ApeTrully (voiced by Ian James Corlett) – Commander ApeTrully is the eccentric, well-meaning leader of Big Green. He is based on Song Jiang.
- Woo the Wise (voiced by Adrian Petriw) – Woo the Wise is a human inventor who was the first person to be convinced to join Big Green. He is based on Wu Yong.

==== First Squad ====
Big Green's elite warriors and the series' main characters. Among its members are:

- Lin Chung (voiced by Andrew Francis) – Based on Lin Chong.
- Jumpy Ghostface (voiced by Brian Drummond) – Based on Du Xing.
- Mystique Sonia (voiced by Kelly Sheridan) – Based on Sun Erniang.
  - Yaksha – Based on the spirit of the same name.
- Mighty Ray (voiced by Ian James Corlett) – Based on Lei Heng.
- Mr. No Hands (voiced by Ian James Corlett) – Based on Dai Zong.

==== Second Squad ====
The Big Green's secondary warriors. They are jealous of First Squad and constantly at odds with them to prove their worth. Among its members are:

- Alpha Girl Latifah (voiced by Tabitha St. Germain) – Based on Gu Dasao.
- Golden Eye Husky (voiced by Brian Drummond) – Based on Shi En.
- Kowloon (voiced by Ian James Corlett) – Based on Shi Jin.
- Hurricane Lee (voiced by Scott McNeil) – Based on Li Kui.
- Archer Lee (voiced by Tabitha St. Germain in Season 1) – Based on Hua Rong.

==== Big Green Air Force ====
A part of Big Green's army that specializes in air battles. They dress in white and use large jet-shaped firecrackers as jets and giant afros inside their hats as air brakes and parachutes. Among the members are:

- Master Chou (voiced by Brian Drummond) – Based on Zhou Tong.
- Rosefinch (voiced by Kelly Sheridan) – Based on Wang Dingliu.
- Burly (voiced by Ian James Corlett) – Based on Li Gun.

==== Other members ====
- Red-Face Kwan (voiced by Eric Bauza) – Based on Guan Sheng.
- The Sailor Brothers (voiced by Brian Drummond) – Based on Ruan Xiao'er, Ruan Xiaowu, and Ruan Xiaoqi.
- Rattle Diva (voiced by Tabitha St. Germain) – Based on Yang Chun.
- Sammo the Whale (voiced by Andrew Francis) – Based on Shan Tinggui.
- Wu Sung (voiced by Eric Bauza) – Based on Wu Song.
- Gardener Ching (voiced by Andrew Francis) – Based on Zhang Qing.
- The Fruiter – Based on Lu Zhishen.
- Origin Man (voiced by Brian Drummond) – Based on Meng Kang.
- Lady Green (voiced by Kathleen Barr) – Based on Hu Sanniang.
- Yan Ching (voiced by Vincent Tong) – Based on Yan Qing.
- The Zebra Brothers (voiced by Adrian Petriw and Brian Drummond) – Based on Kong Ming and Kong Liang.
- Bearstomp – Based on Ling Zhen.
- The Commander of Darkness (voiced by Brian Drummond in season 1, Scott McNeil in season 2) – Based on Li Li.
- Bronze Giant - Based on Duan Jingzhu.

=== Villains ===
- Twin Masters (voiced by Scott McNeil)
- HighRoller (voiced by Brian Drummond) – Based on Gao Qiu.
- Spotter the Rabbit (voiced by Trevor Devall)
- Minotaur (voiced by Kwesi Ameyaw)
- Nain (voiced by Trevor Devall)

== Production and animation ==
Hero: 108 is co-produced by American studio MoonScoop Entertainment, Taiwanese studio Gamania Digital Entertainment, Irish studio Telegael Teoranta and Chinese studio Hong Ying Animation for Turner Entertainment Networks International Limited. Filipino studio Toon City provided the animation for the show with their CelAction2D workstation engines.

== Broadcast and release ==
The show aired on Cartoon Network in the United States from March 1, 2010 to June 21, 2013. It also aired on Boomerang from February 4, 2013 to May 30, 2014, before later picking up on by their production company Splash Entertainment’s on-demand streaming service app, Kabillion Channel on YouTube, for re-runs after their run ended on Cartoon Network.

== In other media ==
=== Advertisements ===
Hero: 108 has appeared in many Beanfun! commercials to sponsor Gamania which featured many flash-animated clips of previous episodes, in which an event occurred which featured a big bean appearing being pixelated, then the character disappears which features the bean transforming into a question mark and an exclamation point. None of the characters have any dialog at all in the commercials except Mighty Ray in one commercial where he says "Okay, Banana?".

An American toy commercial was made to sponsor the Hero: 108 action figures that are available in Toys "R" Us. The commercial aired rarely, mostly on Cartoon Network, making it the only Hero: 108 commercial to air in television.

=== Video game ===
An MMORPG based on the series titled Hero: 108 Online had the players play as First Squad and Second Squad. This MMORPG game was developed by Gamania's RedGate Games subsidiary. Its servers are now closed.

== See also ==
- Pucca
