= Grand Chase =

2003 video game

- Developer: KOG Studios
- Publishers: Netmarble, Asiasoft, Nexon, Gamania, SG Interactive, Level Up! Games, Megaxus, Kill3rCombo, Axeso5
- Engine: Gamebryo
- Platform: Microsoft Windows
- Release: KOR: August 2003; NA: February 7, 2008
- Genre: Action MMORPG
- Mode: Multiplayer

Grand Chase (Korean: 그랜드체이스) is a free-to-play, two-dimensional side-scrolling MMORPG, developed by the South Korean company KOG Studios. Alternative names for Grand Chase included Three Young Heroes (Chinese: 3小俠), Eternal Adventures (Chinese: 永恆冒險), both used in Taiwan prior to its closure, as well as Rainbow Warriors (Chinese: 彩虹骑士) on the Mainland Chinese server.

The game initially launched for South Korea in 2003. After becoming a large success, the game expanded to most of Asia, the Americas and Europe. Grand Chase broke the record of most played online game in Brazil and earned the "most popular online game" award in Indonesia on 2011.

In 2015, the original game ceased development and terminated its service worldwide, with the Korean server being the last to close. Elsword, another game developed by KOG, was created as the spiritual successor to Grand Chase. In 2018, the main game received an official sequel in form of the mobile game Grand Chase: Dimensional Chaser. A spin-off borrowing some characters and taking place in a parallel universe, KurtzPel, is currently under Steam early access.

KOG has also announced a relaunch of the game for personal computers in 2021, retitled Grand Chase Classic, which started in closed beta testing. By 2022 the beta test phase was ended and it was open free to play for all on Steam.

== Plot ==
The story was focused on the adventures of the Grand Chase, a group of heroes from the region of Bermesiah, who departed on a quest to chase down the evil queen Kaze'aze, a witch who used her magic powers to cause a civil war between Bermesiah's kingdoms of Serdin and Kanavan. The players control of one of the members of the Grand Chase, and fights through dungeons and Kaze'aze minions to get stronger and track the evil queen.

From the very start, there were three main characters available: the knight Elesis, the magician Arme, and the elven archer Lire. More characters were added to the available roster with subsequent updates, each adding a different play style from the rest, and were unlockable by either performing a difficult free mission or by purchasing the character with real money. The final version of Grand Chase included 20 playable characters.

== Gameplay ==
Because of the game's use of combos and special abilities, Grand Chase is similar to other side-scrolling fighting games such as Double Dragon, while the appearance and design of the backdrops, as well as the characters and monsters, put the game in an anime-esque setting. While it was an action game, the designers took care to not make it a "button masher".

The game was free-to-play, where players earned a currency known as Game Points (or GP) from completing dungeon quests, individual missions, or defeating other users in player versus player combat. Players could use Game Points to buy better equipment and items, although there were some items that could only be purchased with real-world currency. Users would start the game with one character and could eventually unlock three additional characters. Players were able to own more than four characters, but were required to buy additional character slots to do so.

Each character was leveled and equipped separately; Equipment was character-specific, although a few accessories could be used by all characters. The player might freely switch among the characters they had unlocked before entering combat, each with their own specific equipment, abilities and experience level.

=== Player versus environment ===
A screenshot of a player character attacking a boss monster

Grand Chase was centered around player versus environment gameplay. Players would have a number of dungeons available to complete. These dungeons consisted of branching levels filled with enemies, usually with a stronger boss on the final one. When entering a dungeon, a player might form a 4-player group (or party) to complete it. When choosing a dungeon to play, the player was given the option to create a party of their own, or join one created by other players. Players could repeat dungeons as many times as they liked.

After each expedition into a dungeon, characters would gain experience points. While the amount of experience gained was partially dependent on the player's performance and character level, every player would gain some amount experience after completing a dungeon. When sufficient experience was obtained, the player's character would advance by one level. Higher levels improved statistics, granted access to better equipment, and unlocked more difficult dungeons. Characters stopped leveling up when they reached level 85.

Items required to complete quests would automatically be given to the players at a certain rate. All other items were distributed to different party members by a "dice" system. When an item was picked up by any party member, each member of the party would roll their own set of dice; the player with the highest number would then gain the item. The size of the player's inventory was limited, but could be increased by purchasing space with paid currency or through events. To encourage group play, players would get a slight experience boost when working together.

Relay Dungeons were a unique type of dungeon, only available during certain events. In a Relay Dungeon, the players fought through every boss of a certain dungeon group (or continent) in order. The bosses in the Relay Dungeon had increased statistics, making them more difficult to defeat. After a boss was defeated, a chest containing valuable items, possibly including paid items, was opened. Any boss that was available in that continent's dungeons could be chosen.

=== Player versus player ===
Players could also compete against each other in player versus player (or PVP) combat. There were three types of PVP combat in Grand Chase: Team Battles, Survival and Honor Guard. Win/loss statistics for each of the player's characters were recorded for these matches.

- Team battles consisted of two, four, or six players. Players would be divided in two teams, and their goal was to defeat the opposing team by knocking out all the other team's characters. Team battles encouraged players to plan their attack strategies and co-operate with one another to defeat the opposing team.
- Survival was a mode where anywhere between two and six players battled one another until only one player was left alive. The surviving player was given first place, and the other players were ranked based on their number of kills. The rounded-down, top ranked half of the Players in the room would get a win. This was done to encourage players to fight, instead of hide or run from the others until he or she was the only player left alive.
- Honor Guard was similar to a Team Battle. At the start of the match, one member of each team was randomly selected as a 'Warlord', shown by a red/blue marker. The aim of the game was to successfully defeat the opposing team's Warlord twice. Warlords were given double regular stats to help defend themselves from the opposing team. Furthermore, a Warlord had only two lives, whereas other players could re-spawn after defeat endlessly. When a Warlord was defeated once, the other team's Warlord suffered from a drastically lowered level of defense for 10 seconds. Warlords could not regenerate health.

Alongside the regular match types, players could choose special modifiers to make fights more interesting: Tag and Item Mode.

- Tag matches allowed players to play with two characters of their choice. By pressing a button, they could switch characters during the course of the fight. However, if one of the characters was killed, the player could no longer switch to that character. When one of the player's characters was knocked out, the player was automatically switched to their other character.
- Item Mode matches had "power ups" dropped onto the battlefield at regular intervals throughout the match, that could be used by the player that picked them up. These power ups granted the player special abilities, such as invisibility or invincibility, for a short duration of time. Each player could store up to three power ups at any time. If a player was killed while holding power ups, they would be dropped on their feet and would become available to be picked up by other players.

== Closure ==
From 2013 to 2015, all of the Grand Chase servers ceased operations; the North American server was shut down on April 15, 2015, after eight years of operations, as KOG encouraged its players to migrate to Elsword. The Philippine publisher Level Up! Games, with support of the Brazilian and Philippine community, offered to buy the rights of the game, but KOG Studios refused. The Asian servers were shut down on December 31, 2015.

=== Legacy ===
On July 30, 2015, only a few months after the closure of Grand Chase in North America, the South Korean company Eyedentity Games published Grand Chase M, a short-lived mobile port of the game developed by Da Vinci Games, for Android and iOS systems. According to the publisher, Grand Chase M hit 2 million downloads 1 week after its release globally.

== Grand Chase: Dimensional Chaser ==
In 2016, KOG Studios announced a mobile game made by itself. KOG Studios and Kakao Games released the game Grand Chase for Kakao in 30 January 2018. In July 2018, the game was released internationally and renamed Grand Chase: Dimensional Chaser in Japan and the Philippines. A Taiwanese server is later opened to form the Asian server alongside Japan and the Philippines, which is also open to other countries in Southeast Asia.

On November 23, 2019, a KOG was no longer part of the game's continuity decisions.

International servers use English, Japanese and Portuguese language voice-overs.

The game serves as the sequel for the PC game, while introducing new characters and setting. The game has different mechanics compared to the original game; The player has to use a team of up to four characters with different classes to run dungeons and defeat monsters and bosses strategically.
