= Virtual tax =

Proposed tax on internet gamers

Virtual tax is a proposed USA tax on internet gamers for items bought or traded solely within the virtual world (Internet game worlds). The tax on a transaction would be considered as if it were a purchase or sale (if real currency is involved) or barter (if not). Virtual property, on the death of the owner, would be considered as if it were any other intangible property for the purpose of estate or inheritance tax. The Joint Economic Committee of the U.S. Congress has investigated taxing such transactions. This tax might include items bought with virtual currency, virtual items traded for other virtual items, real items traded for virtual items, and real currency traded for virtual items.

== Examples ==
The online game MapleStory, which displays the rate of in-game currency collected whenever a trade is conducted successfully between two players

Many online games, like Maple Story, have implemented a tax system to curb the inflation rate of in-game items. The tax is collected whenever a trade is conducted between two players. A small percentage of in-game money paid by the buyer is collected as tax before reaching the hands of the seller. The game developer claims that by taking out a small amount of game money in each trade, it will curb the inflation.

However, many users stated that this is the biggest push factor to inflate, as the sellers now demand higher prices before selling an item (in order to make up for the loss of in-game money through tax system). Also, some users state that the inflation will eventually stop without the interference of the game developer. They claim that as more players achieve high levels, they would be able to hunt more monsters and deliver more equipment. Like the real world, the economy of online games are based on supply and demand. When more items are released into the market, it pushes the supply up, resulting in cheaper goods.

== Recent restrictions and changes ==
eBay, in order to protect virtual property and avoid legal action against them, has banned all sales from virtual sites. The only exception to the ban is Second Life which in the eyes of many, including eBay representatives, is not a game. Many of the major virtual world (e.g. EverQuest II) providers have also started their own virtual trading shops. Players will be able to trade virtual items with other players for real cash, and the providers will receive a small tax charged on every transaction.

The government has also stated that they want to start taxing online game transactions; however, charging these new taxes will require new equipment.

== See also ==
- Taxation in the United States
