= Elsword: El Lady =

2016–2017 South Korean animation

- Hangul: 엘소드: 엘의 여인
- RR: Elsodeu: Erui yeoin
- MR: Elsodŭ: Erŭi yŏin
- Genre: web animation
- Based on: Elsword by KOG Studios
- Developed by: DR Movie
- Written by: NZ
- Directed by: Gim Dongjun
- Creative director: Nexon
- Theme music composer: Opening theme: Gim Dalu; Ending theme: Chae Hana; Gim Dalu
- Opening theme: Runner's High
- Ending theme: Hope Beyond
- Country of origin: South Korea
- Original language: Korean
- No. of episodes: 12

Production
- Executive producers: Manager of production: Jeong Jeonggyun; Jeong Yeongmok; Character design and drawing director: Gim Dongsik
- Producers: Producer: Yi Jeonghyeon; Gim Yongdae; Gim Seongtae; Bak Jaemin; Art director: Gang Seungchan; Gim Miyeon; Director of photography: Bak Jangho; Music director: Gim Jeonga; Sound director: Choe Oksun
- Editor: Nam Jonghyeon

Original release
- Network: YouTube
- Release: November 3 – December 29, 2017

Elsword: El Lady is an aeni (South Korean animation) based on the South Korean online game Elsword. It adapts the story of the gamefrom Hamel to Lanox. DR Movie produced the series while NZ wrote the story. The series consists of 12 episodes, each 12 minutes long. The first episode released on a screening event on December 10, 2016, following the online release 3 days after. The original cast from the game voiced their original character with the exception of Aisha.

== Episodes ==
No.	Official English title (Original Korean title)	Original air date	Note
1	"The Adventure Begins!" "Moheomui Sijak!" (모험의 시작!)	December 10, 2016	
2	"Suspicious Company" "Susanghan Donghaeng" (수상한 동행)	July 9, 2017	
3	"Water Temple" "Mului Sinjeon" (물의 신전)	November 3, 2017	
4	"The Priestess of Lanox" "Ranokseuui Sinnyeo" (라녹스의 신녀)	November 10, 2017	
5	"Scar's Objective" "Majokui Mokjeok" (마족의 목적)	November 17, 2017	
6	"For Those We Cherish" "Sojunghan Sarameul Wihae" (소중한 사람을 위해)	November 24, 2017	
7	"Hidden Truth" "Gamchwodun Jinsil" (감춰둔 진실)	December 1, 2017	
8	"Meaning of Friendship" "Dongnyoui Uimi" (동료의 의미)	December 8, 2017	
9	"Troubled Mind" "Heundeullineun Maeum" (흔들리는 마음)	December 15, 2017	
10	"You are Not Alone" "Honjaga Aniya" (혼자가 아니야)	December 22, 2017	
11	"Final Retaliation" "Choehuui Ban-gyeok" (최후의 반격)	December 29, 2017	
12	"A New Beginning" "Saeroun Chulbal" (새로운 출발)	December 29, 2017	

== Music ==
=== Opening theme ===
Title	Artist	Release date	Note
"Runner's High"	Asteria (vocal by Jeong Hyeonmo)	October 30, 2017	

=== Ending theme ===
Title	Artist	Release date	Note
"Hope Beyond" "Dasi Mannan Huimang" (다시 만난 희망)	Asteria (vocal by Eunto)	October 30, 2017	

== See also ==
- Aeni
