= KOG Studios =

South Korean video game company

KOG Co.
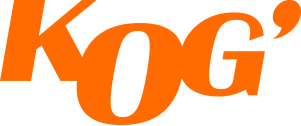
- Type: Private
- Industry: Video games
- Founded: May 1, 2000; 26 years ago
- Headquarters: Daegu, South Korea
- Key people: Dong Gyu Lee (CEO)
- Subsidiaries: KOG Games
- Website: www.kog.co.kr

KOG Co., better known as KOG Studios, is a South Korean video game developer based in Daegu. They specialize in producing online free-to-play games, and currently publish the side-scrolling action MMORPG, Elsword and the early access action MMORPG, KurtzPel: Bringer of Chaos. They have also developed the game Grand Chase.

== History ==
KOG Co. was founded on May 1, 2000. Their first game, Grand Chase, an action side-scrolling MMORPG, launched in August 2003. After being a large success in South Korea, the game expanded to mainland China and Japan, as well as the Americas in 2006. It was notable for reaching mass popularity in South America, breaking the record of most played online game in Brazil. Ntreev Soft began publishing Grand Chase for North America in early 2008. KOG ceased support for the game in 2015, 12 years after its initial release.

In 2010, KOG Studios partnered with Philippine company Level Up! Games, the publisher of Grand Chase in South America, to found Kill3r Combo, a subsidiary company headquartered in Irvine, California, with the objective of bringing KOG's games to North America. Their first game was Elsword, which began open beta testing in North America on April 27, 2011,and released on July 2, 2014.

In June 2012, KOG Studios purchased LevelUp!’s interest in Kill3rCombo to become the sole owner, and officially changed the company's name to KOG Games Inc. Since then, KOG Games has been responsible for publishing their games in the Americas.

Although Elsword received some criticism for pay to win systems, the game was generally well-received, and peaked with 2,500 active players on Steam in August 2013.

KurtzPel Bringer of Chaos was first announced in the South Korean game exhibition G-Star 2017. It entered worldwide Steam early access on April 30, 2019.

=== KOG Games ===
KOG Games (previously as Kill3r Combo from 2010 to 2012) is a subsidiary company of KOG Co., and since 2012, publishes games from KOG in the Americas. It is headquartered in Irvine, California and currently publishes Elsword and KurtzPel on the Steam store. KOG Games also briefly published HeroWarz, a MMORPG developed by A.Storm, in July 2016, but the servers were closed a few months later.

== Games ==
Year	Title	Platform(s)	Genre	Publisher(s)	Status
2003	Grand Chase	PC	Action Side-scrolling 2D MMORPG	Ntreev Soft (2008–2015) (NA); KOG Games (2021–) (WW) List: KOR: Netmarble (2003–2015); TW/HK: Gamania (2006–2013); BR/PHL: Level Up! Games (2006–2015); SEA: AsiaSoft (2009–2013); IDN: PT Megaxus (2010–2015)	Active
2007	Elsword	PC	Action Side-scrolling 2.5D MMORPG	KOG Games (2011–) (NA) List: KOR: Nexon (2007–); TW/HK: Gamania (2008–); JP: NHN Japan (2009–); EU: Gameforge (2010–); CHN: Giant Interactive (2011–); TH: AsiaSoft (2012–); BR/PHL: Level Up! Games (2013–)	Active
2012	Fighters Club	PC	Brawler Action MMORPG	Nexon (2012–2015) (KOR) List: JP: NHN Japan (2012–2015); TW: Garena (2014–2017)	Closed
2014	Ultimate Race	PC	Racing MMORPG	Nexon (KOR) Good Game Thailand (2016 - 2017)	Closed
2015	AIMA Online	PC	Action MMORPG	Nexon (2015–2016) (KOR)	Closed
2018	Grand Chase: Dimensional Chaser	Android, iOS	Mobile Real-time strategy MMORPG	KOG Games (2018–) (WW)	Active
2020	KurtzPel: Bringer of Chaos	PC	Action	KOG Games (TBA) (WW)	Active
2024	Return Alive	PC	Top-down Extraction	KOG Games (TBA) (WW)	Closed
