= Zevo-3 =

- Genre: Superhero; Action; Adventure; Science fiction
- Created by: John Massé
- Directed by: Trevor Wall
- Voices of: Bryton James; Dante Basco; Kari Wahlgren; Mark Hamill; Kevin Michael Richardson; Grey DeLisle; Pamela Adlon
- Opening theme: "Zevo-3"
- Composer: Judith Gruber-Stitzer
- Country of origin: United States
- Original language: English
- No. of seasons: 1
- No. of episodes: 26

Production
- Executive producers: Kristen Van Cott; Gary Patrick; Christopher Allen; Elizabeth Daro
- Producer: Lolee Aries
- Running time: 22 minutes
- Production companies: Maslen Entertainment; MoonScoop Entertainment; Skechers Entertainment

Original release
- Network: Nicktoons
- Release: October 11, 2010 – May 7, 2011

Zevo-3 is an American animated television series co-produced by Maslen Entertainment, MoonScoop Entertainment and Skechers Entertainment for Nicktoons. It premiered on October 11, 2010 and ended on May 7, 2011 after one season. It features the superheroes Z-Strap, Kewl Breeze, and Elastika, characters that appeared in Skechers children's sneaker commercials.

== Premise ==
The show is about three teens who get powers in a lab when Zevo compound covers them, due to an experiment done by the evil Stankfoot. Together they fight off mutant monsters that arise while dealing with their own teenage problems, including school, friends, and feelings.

== Cast and characters ==
=== Main characters ===
- Jason James/Z-Strap (voiced by Bryton James): A loner that loves to go free running over in Stankville. He met Ellie/Elastika and her brother Matt/Kewl Breeze when he almost ran them over at the chemical plant. He controls metal objects, and can turn his appendages into metal objects (spears, cages, blocks, etc.). After being Zevoed he began to hang out with the siblings and has become a friend and older sibling to them both from time to time. It might seem like Ellie and Matt annoy him, and sometimes they do, but deep down he cares; showing compassion is just hard for him since he's still bitter about his parents leaving him. He lives on a barge outside of New Eden City with his Grams. It is revealed in “Welcome to Paradise Bay” that his greatest fear is being alone; however, he is able to overcome that. He also seems to harbor awkward, romantic feelings for Ellie; this was shown when they nearly kissed before Matt interrupted to inform them of Mayor Bronson's status as a mutant. He's an urban sports enthusiast, and is an excellent skate boarder and free runner. He's also an artist, something he seemed to get into when his parents were killed in action.
- Matt Martin/Kewl Breeze (voiced by Dante Basco): Matt is the younger brother to Ellie/Elastika and looks up to Jason/Z-Strap like a role model and older brother. His powers involve manipulation of ice; and so far he's shown to be extremely powerful and skilled in their use. An example of his power level is shown when he instantly flash freezes a wall of ice taller and wider than the 50 ft tall robot brought to life by Jason's mutated blood. He's also nearly completely flash frozen Jason's barge, and has shown the ability to generate levels of cold close enough to liquid nitrogen that he can shatter metal. He was the one who accidentally released the Zevo Compound infecting him, Ellie and Jason. In the episode Welcome to “Paradise Bay”, it is revealed that his greatest fear is heat. Despite being the youngest of the group, Matt is easily the smartest, and shows super genius level intellect. So far he's invented a device that allowed Z-Strap to shrink himself to microscopic size due to his metal manipulation, an advanced communication system, a Heads Up Display for his shades, and more. Although many of his technological wonders seem to be trial and error, it's more of his lack of resources than anything that hinders him.
- Ellie Martin/Elastika (voiced by Kari Wahlgren): Ellie is a sporty busybody that always has something to do or somewhere to be. She seems to be involved in everything possible, and almost never has time for fun. Her hair has become incredibly strong and durable after her exposure to the Zevo Compound. Her hair can be spun around like a rotor blade and fly her through the air like a helicopter, compressed into a giant eardrum to enhance her hearing; her hair is even strong enough to toss a city bus and temporarily slow down a giant robot. Ellie is a talented gymnast. In the episode “Welcome to Paradise Bay”, it is revealed that her worst fear is failing. She is the older sister to Matt/Kewl Breeze and is good friends with Jason/Z-Strap. There seem to be hints of romantic feelings between Jason and Ellie, although they both deny them whenever anything about it is mentioned.
- Grams (voiced by Sheryl Lee Ralph): She is Jason's grandmother who took care of him after his parents were sent out on their missions only to not return. She knows that Jason, Ellie, and Matt have super powers. She admits in the episode “Welcome to Paradise Bay” that she has already faced all her greatest fears. In the episode “Shutterbug”, she says that she likes Ellie and Jason as a romantic couple. It is later revealed she knows more about Jason's parents and Operation Z than she is letting on.

=== Villains ===
- Stankfoot (voiced by Mark Hamill): Stankfoot was originally named Dr. Stanley K. Foot, the heir to the legacy of the Foot family who founded Footville. A scientist working on the Zevo Compound, he caused the accident changing many people to mutants and turning him to stone. When he was revived by the Zevo Compound decades later, he realized his city had been demolished by Ronson in favor of New Eden City and made it his goal to reclaim his birthright from Ronson. He has shown the ability to create new Lifeforms (Blacktop and Dark Materia) to mutating someone (Mutating Ronson's aide to an insect humanoid like mutant). During his battle with Ronson in the season finale, Stankfoot was hit with Anti-Zevo and is reduced to slime, resulting him to retreat through a sewer drain and swearing his return to Ronson.
  - Blacktop: A brainless but powerful shape shifting mutant intentionally from the slime from the bottom of Stankfoot's foot. Being Stankfoot's first creation, Black is devotedly loyal and server as his creator' enforcer. He is constantly destroyed by Zevo-3, but is always getting recreated by Stankfoot, who views him as a kind of son, from whatever remained of him.
- Dark Materia (voiced by Beverly Ann Myers): Dark Materia is a mutant-like homunculus made by Stankfoot from a combination of Dark Matter and pure Zevo compound to keep him company. However, extremely prideful and arrogant, Dark Materia saw Stankfoot as nothing than incompetent fool and harbored a deep hatred for the mad scientist to the point of killing him when given the chance. As a result, she allied herself Ronson a few times in order to perfect her unexpected ability to manipulate all Zevo-affected mutants. However, in the events of "Mutation Termination", she is killed by Stankfoot.
- Mayor Brett Ronson III (voiced by Kevin Michael Richardson): Brett is the one who led the creation of New Eden City, the second of the two main antagonists in the series. Knowing Stankfoot, Ronson may have played a hand in the Zevo Compound. As mayor of New Eden City, he spends time with the community, campaigns of a new city, and hires his city enforcers to aid in his propaganda against all mutants and mutant-related incidents, including the Zevo-3 team. However, Ronson hides a variety of dark secrets that only his enforcers know about: One being that he is a mutant with a tumor-like creature emerging from his back that he treats as a separate entity despite being an aspect of himself. Another dark secret is his master plan is brainwashing people to share his views, his workers being among them. Though unaware of Stankfoot's return at first, Ronson later learns of it while attempting to capture Dark Materia for his agenda before she is killed off. During his own battle with Stankfoot in the season finale, Ronson was hit with Anti-Zevo and becomes a normal human again as he resumes his agenda with Stankfoot no longer a hindrance and continues his rivalry against Zevo-3.

=== Supporting characters ===
- Sagacity Acumen (voiced by Kevin Michael Richardson): The guru-like owner of the 6/10 convenience store in New Eden City. He and Grams have been friends for many years and acted as her eyes and ears in New Eden City. He also acts as an advice guru to Jason when he has a problem. He also owns a small piece of hardened Zevo Compound, which, once held, can give brief visions of the future.
- Florence "Flo" Cara (voiced by Grey DeLisle): A brave-hearted paramedic in New Eden City, who occasionally helps out Zevo-3. She seems to know more about Zevo-3 than she appears to be letting on.
- Cotilla (voiced by Grey DeLisle): Ellie's best friend and the local gossip. She is very boy-crazy and frequently calls cute boys "hotties". In the episode “Welcome to Paradise Bay”, it is revealed that her worst fear is having no boys around at all. She also seems to harbour schoolgirl feelings for Jason and his alter-ego, Z-Strap.
- Angel (voiced by Pamela Adlon): Ellie's other best friend and a gloomy Goth girl. Not much is known about her, except that in the episode “Welcome to Paradise Bay”, it is revealed that her worst fear is wearing something colorful.
- The Moloks: A group of mutants who were fused to parts of the Footville Subway by the Zevo Compound. They live underground and act quite primitively,
  - Bug (voiced by Benjamin Diskin): A green bug-like mutant who lives in Stankville and is the son of the leader of the Moloks. He is very skilled and a bit of a loner, he left the Moloks some time ago. But after being forced to help Z-Strap and Elastika, he returned to them. Now he is an ally to Zevo-3 and continues to have feelings for Ellie, as shown in episode Heart of Darkness.
  - Bobby (voiced by Benjamin Diskin): A small blue mutant with metallic limbs and helmet. He and Bug share a "Big-Brother/Little Brother" relationship and he seems to relate to Kewl Breeze. At first, all he could do was make the sound of a Subway stop signal, but thanks to Grams and Matt, he gained the ability to talk.
- The Mengalsons: A family of strange-looking, but quite sentient mutants, who live in a rundown old motel in an old part of Footville. Brett Ronson III tried to tear down their motel, but thanks to Zevo-3, he failed.
  - George: The patriarch of the family, a green, slime mutant wearing a white shirt and blue pants.
  - Beatrice: George's wife, a tentacled, worm-like mutant with a pink dress and headband
  - Thomas and Thomas: George and Beatrice's twin sons, both of them round purple, ball-like mutants with short arms and long legs. They both appear to be very immature and goofy.
  - Granny: George's mother and grandmother to his kids, when the Zevo Compound mutated the family, she was fused into the floor and gives the appearance of a green shag rug with a face.
  - Caroline (voiced by Tara Strong): George and Beatrice's daughter and Thomas and Thomas' sister, roughly around Matt/Kewl Breeze's age it seems. Of all the Mengalsons, she is the most unusual. For one thing, she seems the most humanoid (not counting her tail, pointed ears and green coloring) and for another, like Zevo-3, the Zevo Compound gave her special powers. She is able to heal any injury (but not always completely). She is very polite and grateful for when Zevo-3 saved her home and family. Matt developed a crush on Caroline the moment he saw her and from what is seen in her appearances so far, the feeling appears to be mutual (In both her appearances, she gave him a kiss on the cheek).

=== Additional voices ===
- Eric Bauza - Brad
- Daran Norris
- Jeff Bennett - Barry Brite
- Charlie Schlatter
- Ian James Corlett - Goon Squad Captain
- Jennifer Hale - Laura Lebraun
- Nicole Sullivan
- Kimberly Brooks

== Episodes ==
No.	Title	Directed by	Written by	Original release date
1	"Zevo-3"	Trevor Wall	Michael Ryan	October 11, 2010
Jason, Ellie, and Matt recount how Matt "ruined their lives" by accidentally turning them into superheroes. However, they must step up when a resurgent Stankfoot unleashes his newly-created minion Blacktop.
2	"Control"	Trevor Wall	Michael Ryan	October 16, 2010
When Jason contemplates quitting the superhero business when he has trouble controlling his powers, he seeks help to figure how out from Sagacity Acumen. Meanwhile, Stankfoot creates a companion to rule by his side only to end up with Dark Materia, who is crazier and more power hungry than he is.
3	"Daddy Dearest"	Trevor Wall	Temple Mathews; Danielle Mentzer	October 18, 2010
On his father's birthday, Stankfoot fondly remembers fishing with his dad. But when he discovers the old fishing river has been dammed, Stankfoot decides to blow up the dam and destroy the city. Meanwhile, Ellie attempts to balance being a superhero and her fondness for the new boy in school while Matt tries to perfect an early danger warning device.
4	"A Matter Of Time"	Trevor Wall	David Skelly & Jennifer Skelly	October 25, 2010
When Stankfoot's sleep is disturbed, he orders Blacktop to silence the noise by spreading a dangerous virus. In doing so, Blacktop infects the residents of Eden City, including Ellie. Realizing Blacktop is the key to helping Ellie, Jason and Matt devise a plan for Jason to shrink and hunt inside Blacktop for the cure.
5	"Night Terror"	Trevor Wall	Kevin Hopps	November 1, 2010
Jason, Ellie, and Matt struggle to work together as a real superhero team when Stankfoot unleashes a giant carnivorous plant that grows over New Eden City, absorbing half the population in one night.
6	"Sacrifice"	Trevor Wall	Danielle Mentzer; Ben Schwartz	November 6, 2010
Jason gets a dose of his own medicine when he encounters a loner mutant named Bug in Stankville. Together with Ellie, they have to rescue Matt after he has been captured by a race of underground mechanical mutants who want to offer him up as a sacrifice.
7	"Beneath The City"	Trevor Wall	Eugene Son	November 7, 2010
Zevo-3 must rescue a benevolent mutant fish named Fishy and stop a mass of Zevo-infected earthworms from destroying the city. Meanwhile, Brett Ronson III attempts to persuade the Olympic committee to hold the games in New Eden City. Note: This episode was shown as a sneak peek for the series on Nicktoons on August 22, 2010.
8	"Mutant Hotel"	Trevor Wall	Bart Jennett	November 8, 2010
Zevo-3 must stop Ronson from demolishing a rickety old hotel in Stankville when they learn that it houses the Manglesons, a family of strange but sentient mutants.
9	"Date with Darkness"	Trevor Wall	David McDermott	November 13, 2010
Ronson throws a party for the families of New Eden City, accompanied by Dark Materia. But when the party gets crashed by Stankfoot and his forces, Grams, Matt, and Ellie attempt to hold them off while Jason does some spying and discovers a connection between Ronson, Stankfoot, and even Jason's parents.
10	"Which Came First?"	Trevor Wall	Joelle Sellner	November 15, 2010
Jason and his classmates are given Zevo-infused eggs to take care of for a responsibility assignment. They end up hatching into cute, purple, fluffy mutants, but is there more to the Curples than what meets the eye?
11	"Some Wounds Cut Deep"	Trevor Wall	Michael Ryan	November 20, 2010
When Zevo-infused blood from a cut on Jason's hand gets on one of his childhood toys it turns into a 50-foot tall robot. While Ellie and Matt try to stop this unstoppable robot, they learn about a possible connection between Jason and the robot from an unexpected source.
12	"Delirious"	Trevor Wall	Danielle Mentzer	November 28, 2010
When Jason mistakes Matt's new food experiment for his breakfast, it results in some very strange behavior. As Dark Materia takes advantage of Jason's situation in a bid to overthrow Stankfoot, Matt and Ellie learn that the food's effect may be worse than they realized.
13	"Normal"	Trevor Wall	David Skelly & Jennifer Skelly	November 28, 2010
After Matt's new invention goes awry, the group loses their powers and must adjust back to having normal lives. When they begin to realize that helping people is more important than getting a few extra hours of sleep they get their powers back to get rid of an even more powerful Stankfoot and Dark Materia.
14	"Sidekick"	Trevor Wall	Bart Jennett; Kevin Seccia	December 9, 2010
Cotilla regards Kewl Breeze and Elastika as Z-Strap's sidekicks and posts a video of the group on her blog, causing Z-Strap's popularity to go through the roof. After getting into a fight with Jason, Ellie ends up getting captured by Ronson as part of a "Divide and Conquer" scheme to eliminate Zevo-3.
15	"Testing 1,2,3"	Trevor Wall	David McDermott	December 9, 2010
As Ronson High School's standardized testing day approaches, Zevo-3's Zevo energy is mysteriously increasing off the charts, causing them to suddenly manifest new powers. Unless they can find a way to stop the process, they are all ticking time bombs waiting to go off.
16	"Operation Z"	Trevor Wall	Len Uhley	January 17, 2011
Suspicious of Stankfoot's connection to his late parents, Jason's search for clues leads him to a deep secret within Ronson Tower and a surprising new outlook on his Grams.
17	"De-Mutation"	Trevor Wall	Kevin Hopps; Danielle Mentzer	January 18, 2011
Cotilla's online blog about mutated animals running wild in New Eden gets her into trouble with Ronson, who has painful memories of the original Zevo explosion. Zevo-3 must rescue Cotilla, Matt's pet Trippy, and the other mutant creatures before Ronson disposes of them all.
18	"Career Week"	Trevor Wall	Joelle Sellner	January 19, 2011
During Career Week at Ronson High School, Jason works at the 6–10 convenience store with Sagacity, Ellie rides along with paramedic Florence, and Matt uncovers some strange goings-on at his parents' workplace. Meanwhile, Ronson decides to fight fire with fire and hires a trio of mutant bounty hunters to bring down Zevo-3.
19	"Future Tense"	Trevor Wall	David Skelly & Jennifer Skelly	January 20, 2011
While Jason tries to prevent the horrible future he saw in a vision from happening, Ellie's driving lessons take a turn for the worse when she gets Stankfoot's old car.
20	"Heart of Darkness"	Trevor Wall	Kurt Weldon	January 22, 2011
When Bobby the Molok witnesses Ronson's forces rescue Dark Materia from Stankfoot's lair, he and Bug enlist the help of Zevo-3. Ronson's actions are anything but chivalrous, as he wants access to Dark Materia's unique powers over Zevo energy for his own nefarious purposes.
21	"Living the Dream"	Trevor Wall	Kevin Rubio	January 29, 2011
Jason struggles with his grasp on reality when he wakes up one morning in a world where the Zevo accident never happened, his parents are alive, and Zevo-3 is just a comic book creation of his own imagination.
22	"Blood Feud"	Trevor Wall	David McDermott	April 9, 2011
While helping Florence with a blood drive, Zevo-3 learns of a break-in where the blood bags were actually drained and people are getting snatched off the streets of New Eden in the middle of the night.
23	"Welcome to Paradise Bay"	Trevor Wall	David Skelly & Jennifer Skelly	April 16, 2011
Zevo-3 attempt to enjoy spring break as Ellie goes to New Eden City's public beach, where Jason, Matt, and Grams are coincidentally camping. However, Dark Materia crashes in to eliminate Zevo-3.
24	"Shutterbug"	Trevor Wall	David Skelly & Jennifer Skelly	April 23, 2011
An embarrassing picture taken by Matt of Jason and Ellie "kissing" unexpectedly reveals Ronson is secretly a mutant. However, it also makes Jason and Ellie question the nature of their "relationship".
25	"Mootant"	Trevor Wall	Danielle Mentzer	April 30, 2011
When a mishap causes Matt to swap bodies with one of Stankfoot's missing mutant cows, Jason and Ellie must find an antidote before Matt becomes a mutant cow forever whilst contending with Ronson's assistant.
26	"Mutation Termination"	Trevor Wall	Kevin Rubio	May 7, 2011
When the Zevo Compound is unleashed throughout New Eden City, Zevo-3 must find a way to save the city and stop a three-way war between Ronson, Stankfoot, and Dark Materia. Note: This episode is regarded as the series finale.
