= List of Hero: 108 episodes =

This is a list of episodes from Hero: 108, an animated series created by Yang-Ming Tarng for Cartoon Network.

Note: All the episodes are directed by Trevor Wall and Pongo Kuo; John Fountain co-directed instead nine episodes, and are: "Elephant Castle", "Liger Castle", "Camel Castle", "Parrot Castle", "Turtle Cannon Competition", "Pandaffe Castle", "Eagle Castle", "Baboon Castle", and "Folk Game Competition".

== Series overview ==
Season	Episodes	Segments	Originally released	
Season	Episodes	Segments	First released	Last released
1	26	52	March 1, 2010	April 5, 2010
2	26	52	May 6, 2012	June 8, 2012

== Episodes ==
=== Season 1 (2010) ===
No. overall	No. in season	Title	Written by	Storyboarded by	Original release date	Prod. code
1a	1a	"Rabbit Castle"	Kent Redeker	John Fountain, Peter Ferk, Mark Maxey, and Trevor Wall	March 1, 2010	101a
Commander ApeTrully is captured by the Rabbit King Jumpy Ghostface while trying to make peace with him and the rabbits. When Mighty Ray and Mystique Sonia get captured, Lin Chung comes to the rescue and later goes against Jumpy in a jump rope battle. After Lin Chung wins the competition by beating him, Jumpy and the rabbits join Big Green.
1b	1b	"Elephant Castle"	Kent Redeker	John Fountain, Peter Ferk, Mark Maxey, and Trevor Wall	March 1, 2010	101b
During a heat wave, Big Green hears that the Elephants are using their party whistles to whip humans. While going to save Commander ApeTrully, First Squad are forced to blow a giant whistle more straight than the Elephant King while Lin Chung paints a tree using a bird's footprints. However, the Elephant King destroys his painting, angering him and making him blow the whistle very straight, destroying it.
2a	2a	"Liger Castle"	Kent Redeker	Tom Nesbitt	March 2, 2010	102a
A big surprise, Sonia gets a pimple on her face. However, Yaksha's desire to pop her zit proves to be a problem when it comes to making peace with the Ligers and their king, Golden Eye Husky, which he is burnt to ashes. Meanwhile, Sonia is mad when her friends do not care for her.
2b	2b	"Camel Castle"	Kent Redeker	Dan Kubat and Peter Ferk	March 2, 2010	102b
Lin Chung, despite being the leader of the team, has horrible drawings. His team lies positive things about them. Meanwhile, when he's trying to make peace with the Camels, Commander ApeTrully is captured and used as a drawing model. First Squad tries to save him but fails due to the Camels' foul smelling saliva. Luckily, Woo the Wise decides to freshen their saliva using mint flavored gum.
3a	3a	"Parrot Castle"	Kent Redeker	Gloria Jenkins	March 3, 2010	103a
After Parrot King learns Commander ApeTrully is Monkey King, he accepts his offer to join Big Green, but both of them are captured by the Zebra Brothers.
3b	3b	"Turtle Cannon Competition"	Kent Redeker	Tyree Dillihay	March 3, 2010	103b
First Squad and Second Squad compete in a Turtle Tank race for the Golden Cup of the Turtle and the right to be called First Squad.
4a	4a	"Pandaffe Castle"	Ford Riley	Dan Kubat and Peter Ferk	March 4, 2010	104a
First Squad attends singer and guitarist Rattle Diva's concert, which goes horribly wrong when Mighty Ray and Mystique Sonia sneak on stage and perform with her. Upset by this, Rattle Diva assists the Pandas and Giraffes at Pandaffe Castle. Commander ApeTrully watches half of the show, then "criticises" it. The Pandas and Giraffes despise this and entrap Commander ApeTrully under the weight of one of the Pandas. After First Squad gets captured trying to save him, Rattle Diva manages to save them and forms a band with the Panda and Giraffe Kings after the two join Big Green.
4b	4b	"Eagle Castle"	Jack Monaco	Tom Nesbitt, Peter Ferk, and Tim Maltby	March 4, 2010	104b
While trying to make peace with the Eagles, Commander ApeTrully ends up trapped in a large metal skeleton created by the Zebra Brothers and operated by the Eagles.
5a	5a	"Baboon Castle"	Kent Redeker	Gloria Jenkins	March 5, 2010	105a
Since Commander ApeTrully has hurt his foot, Woo the Wise and the Parrot King are sent to cover for him when it comes to making peace with the Baboons who have been brainwashed by evil fleas causing them to steal water from the humans. Meanwhile, a lack of laundry work at Big Green results in a bad smell that causes the females there to faint.
5b	5b	"Folk Game Competition"	Kent Redeker	Tyree Dillihay and Peter Ferk	March 5, 2010	105b
Unable to find a solution to increased traffic and decreased housing in East Citadel during his plans to conquer the Moon, HighRoller holds a Folk Game Competition to try to acquire Big Green and goes up against Jumpy Ghostface. If Jumpy wins, HighRoller gives up Bear Castle. If HighRoller wins, he gets Big Green. Despite Jumpy losing the competition, Woo comes up with a solution to fix HighRoller's problems.
6	6	"Pitched Battle of the Tank Army"	Kent Redeker	Gloria Jenkins (Part I) Sandra Frame (Part II)	March 8, 2010	106
To compete against Big Green's Turtle Tanks in a plot to obtain a box containing two demons (who are said to have the power to turn humans into animals), HighRoller equips Chameleon Queen and her subjects with shell-shaped armors made from the ruins of an old bell tower.
7a	7a	"Camel Castle II"	Kent Redeker	Tom Nesbitt and Tim Maltby	March 9, 2010	107a
Camel King finds that he is a great artist if he's hit on the head. After beating Lin Chung in an art contest, Camel King takes his confidence too far by believing that Camels are superior artists and once again has them mistreat the humans. With Lin Chung depressed upon being defeated, the other members of First Squad try to stop Camel King without him. Thankfully, Lin Chung manages to defeat the Camel King with the help of Elephant King.
7b	7b	"Turtle Cannon Competition II"	Kent Redeker	Rafael Navarro and Tim Maltby	March 9, 2010	107b
First Squad and Second Squad compete in another Turtle Cannon Competition. This time, both teams end up using turtles of different sizes for each event. For the first event, giant turtles are used to shoot each team's captain and for the second event, the Tiny Turtle tanks are used as Roller Skates.
8a	8a	"Elephant Castle II"	Kent Redeker	Tim Maltby	March 10, 2010	108a
Elephant King, while taking a walk to find some creativity to make his job better, is hurt when he overhears a mean trick by the Zebra Brothers about Big Green and has the humans create tanks for the Elephants. Commander ApeTrully ends up captured trying to get Elephant King back. With Lin Chung having a cold from too much cold air, the rest of First Squad has to rescue Commander ApeTrully without him. Ultimately, the Elephant King gets muddy, Mystique Sonia cleans him and then reveals the Zebra Brothers, whom Elephant King throws into the mud.
8b	8b	"Peacock Castle"	Cate Lieuwen	Gloria Jenkins and Tim Maltby	March 10, 2010	108b
When Mystique Sonia does not fall under the spell of the Peacock Queen's beauty and obey her, she challenges Sonia to a beauty contest which involves having to use fans to extinguish the nearby volcano's flames.
9	9	"The Pitched Battle of the Navies"	Kent Redeker	Andrew Dickman and Tim Maltby (Part I) Tom Nesbitt and Tim Maltby (Part II)	March 11, 2010	109
First Squad and the Big Green Navy compete against HighRoller's Navy to be the first to find a large soil-based creature which has emerged from a meteor that crashed in the ocean.
10a	10a	"Dog Castle"	Kent Redeker	David Zweig, Tim Maltby, and Gloria Jenkins	March 12, 2010	110a
When First Squad is sent to the frozen areas to make peace with the Dog King, Mighty Ray also helps dentist Wu Sung find his long-lost brother. First Squad soon discovers that the Dog King is a human who was raised by the dogs.
10b	10b	"Rhino Castle"	Laura McCreary	Tim Maltby	March 12, 2010	110b
After receiving trash as tribute from the Rhinos, HighRoller equips the Rhinos' horns with stamps telling them that whatever they stamp, the Rhinos claim what they marked for themselves and HighRoller. Meanwhile, Mighty Ray learns how the Turtles react when he mistreats his turtle.
11a	11a	"Lion Castle"	Holly Huckins	Trevor Wall	March 15, 2010	111a
Mystique Sonia eats too many of her strength buns, causing her to become obese, large and bulky. When Commander ApeTrully gets captured when trying to make peace with the Lions, First Squad and the Infantry must fight on even if Mystique Sonia's current condition may come in handy.
11b	11b	"Crocodile Castle"	Kent Redeker	Garrett Ho and Tim Maltby	March 15, 2010	111b
Not knowing that the slot machines are rigged by the Zebra Brothers, Commander ApeTrully tries to win a jackpot (3 yo-yos in a row) to gain an audience with Crocodile King. When Mighty Ray discovers this, he ends up fighting the Crocodiles. When Mighty Ray does an impossible yo-yo trick, he winds up having the Crocodile King join Big Green to help fix the broken lantern in his room.
12a	12a	"Cat Castle"	Kent Redeker	Tom Nesbitt and Tim Maltby	March 16, 2010	112a
The Cat King and his subjects tear-gas humans who laugh, which is banned by the Cat King, by throwing chili firecrackers at them. Then Commander ApeTrully is captured by the Cats for laughing after seeing the Zebra Brothers cry in pain from the firecrackers' dust. Luckily, after First Squad finds out the hairballs are the reason behind the Cat King's law, Jumpy manages to cheer him and the other Cats up by using his jump rope to project Mighty Ray's comedy act.
12b	12b	"Cheetah Castle"	Kent Redeker	Tom Nesbitt and Tim Maltby	March 16, 2010	112b
A "Cocky Alien" crashes First Squad's Shuttlecock Competition with the King and Queen of Cheetahs, though First Squad fails to recognize it at first. Note: The Cheetahs are one of few animals that did not capture or attack ApeTrully during his visit to the animal's castle.
13a	13a	"Air Battle"	Kent Redeker	Andrew Dickman	March 17, 2010	113b
The Zebra Brothers send the Eagles to attack Big Green and end up overwhelming the Air Force and Anti-Air Troops. Meanwhile, Mighty Ray and Sonia are jealous of Lin Chung.
13b	13b	"Shark Castle"	Hadley Hudson	Todd Waterman and Marcus Williams	March 17, 2010	113b
The Sharks have taken a boat full of people hostage. Meanwhile, First Squad admires Lin Chung's "accidental art", which makes Lin Chung frustrated.
14a	14a	"Parrot Castle II"	Rico Gagliano	Rafael Navarro	March 18, 2010	114b
The Soldiers of Darkness capture the Parrots and Jumpy Ghostface (who was protecting Parrot King). The Zebra Brothers use their Ghost Lantern powers against the Soldiers of Darkness as part of a plot to capture Jumpy Ghostface and Parrot King in order to turn them over to HighRoller for a reward. Absents: Mr. No Hands, Lin Chung, Mighty Ray, and Mystique Sonia
14b	14b	"Folk Game Competition II"	Kent Redeker	Marcus Williams	March 18, 2010	114b
After having a bad dream over a school flashback where he and HighRoller argued that studying is better than comics, Woo creates textbooks for Big Green. Annoyed that his followers are reading Big Green's textbooks, HighRoller orders the Zebra Brothers to destroy all of the books, and holds a Folk Game Competition to distract Big Green from this undertaking. As HighRoller goes up against Lin Chung, the Zebra Brothers unknowingly take HighRoller's comic books as well.
15a	15a	"Snake Castle"	Kent Redeker	Luke Cormican	March 19, 2010	115a
Mystique Sonia receives a bamboo flute as a gift from the Panda King, which makes Yaksha jealous. Snake King and his subjects turn anyone who looks at them into eggs kept inside Snake King's box. When Commander ApeTrully, the Zebra Brothers, Yaksha and most of First Squad end up being turned into eggs, Sonia must overcome her fear of Snakes to defeat Snake King.
15b	15b	"Octopus Castle"	Kent Redeker	David Earl	March 19, 2010	115b
Jumpy Ghostface's ability to draw others into his daydreams comes in handy when making peace with the Octopi who have stolen the color from Big Green's shell on the Zebra Brothers' orders, as well as Mighty Ray's colours.
16a	16a	"EgretOx Castle"	Kent Redeker	Jay Baker	March 22, 2010	116a
The Egrets and the Oxen torment humans by tempting them with fried rice, then throwing lead balls at them. A swarm of locusts attack the rice crops while First Squad attempts to make peace. Jumpy is hurt by Ox King when he tries to befriend the locusts.
16b	16b	"Firework Festival of East Citadel"	Kent Redeker	Lonnie Lloyd	March 22, 2010	116b
HighRoller holds a firework display contest to see if anyone is a better "fireworker" than he is. To draw some challengers from Big Green to East Citadel, he has Bearstomp and the Zebra Brothers capture humans for hostages who may be freed by the winner.
17a	17a	"Chameleon Castle"	Kent Redeker	Marcus Williams	March 23, 2010	117a
HighRoller, Bearstomp, and the Zebra Brothers capture Commander ApeTrully and the Tank Army when Commander ApeTrully tries to make peace with the Chameleons.
17b	17b	"Bald Eagle Castle"	Kent Redeker	Tom Nesbitt	March 23, 2010	117b
The Eagles (now Bald Eagles following their previous encounter with Big Green) want revenge on Big Green. They work with the Zebra Brothers who have captured Commander ApeTrully, Master Chou and Burly. Lin Chung must save them alone due to the other members of First Squad becoming too dazed after their attempt at the parachute test.
18a	18a	"Crab Castle"	Catherine Lieuwen	Marcus Williams	March 24, 2010	118a
This episode shows how Commander ApeTrully got Sammo the Whale on his side and how Sammo helped First Squad, Commander ApeTrully, and the Sailor Brothers get to Crab Castle to save the captive humans.
18b	18b	"Fierce Battle of the Pig and Skunk Armies"	Kent Redeker	Leah Waldron	March 24, 2010	118b
Tired of the Zebra Brothers arguing against each other, HighRoller splits them up so that they can lead the Pig Army and the Skunk Army in attacking Big Green. Meanwhile, Big Green deals with a termite infestation problem.
19	19	"Pitched Battle of the Great Wall Train"	Kent Redeker	Luke Cormican (Part I) David Earl (Part II)	March 25, 2010	119
The Tigers capture humans to power their Great Wall Train to cure HighRoller's toothache by using the Great Wall Train's ability to travel through time. First Squad heads to the Rocky Desert to save them and dentist Wu Sung (who has also been captured while gathering ingredients to his toothpaste). When the train moves, everyone (including First Squad) turn old and Lin Chung falls off the train and they need to figure out how to turn him back to normal. Absent: Commander ApeTrully and Mr. No Hands
20a	20a	"Turtle Cannon Competition III"	Kent Redeker	Luke Cormican	March 26, 2010	120a
Angered that they weren't nominated in the Big Green Awards, Second Squad leaves Big Green and teams up with Chameleon Queen after she had been kicked out of East Citadel upon being accused of eating HighRoller's candy. Second Squad then challenges First Squad to a Turtle Tank Race within Chameleon Queen. Meanwhile, HighRoller discovers that the Zebra Brothers were actually eating his candy all along.
20b	20b	"Scorpion Castle"	Kent Redeker	Tom Nesbitt	March 26, 2010	120b
While trying to make peace with the Scorpions, Commander ApeTrully accidentally rips one of their paper ornaments. When most of First Squad are poisoned and forced to stand upside down, Yaksha is the only one to get the antidote from the Zebra Brothers. However, when the Scorpions make peace with Big Green, the Zebra Brothers use their lanterns to merge into their monster form.
21a	21a	"Table Soccer Competition"	Kent Redeker	David Earl	March 29, 2010	121a
HighRoller challenges Big Green to a Table Soccer Competition. HighRoller makes a bet with Commander ApeTrully where the loser has to drink all of the watermelon juice.
21b	21b	"Groundhog Castle"	Kent Redeker	Leah Waldron	March 29, 2010	121b
The Big Green Restaurant is suffering a vegetable shortage due to the Groundhog King and his subjects stealing vegetables from human farmers. First Squad goes up against the Groundhogs and the Bogwah to determine the fate of the stolen vegetables. After Jumpy Ghostface lands on O, First Squad has a competition to find the stolen vegetables before the Groundhogs do.
22a	22a	"Duckbill Castle"	Kent Redeker	Darin McGowan	March 30, 2010	122a
After accidentally wrecking Lin Chung's drawing of them due to their argument over where it should go, the Cheetah King and Queen accompany Lin Chung to the castle of Duckbill King to get the picture fixed.
22b	22b	"Ostrich Castle"	Kent Redeker	Tom Nesbitt	March 30, 2010	122b
The Bald Eagles (now transformed into Ostriches after an inept rescue by the Zebra Brothers) still team up with them for revenge against First Squad when the Zebra Brothers say they have a method to change them back into Bald Eagles. The Zebra Brothers pretend to join Big Green so they can get First Squad's alarm system and train the Bald Eagles to come to their aid just like First Squad goes to save Commander ApeTrully when he gets captured.
23a	23a	"Deer Castle"	Kent Redeker	Marcus Williams	March 31, 2010	123a
The Deer are capturing the humans near the Magnetic Mountains as the Zebra Brothers frame them for ruining the Deer King's card stacks. When Mighty Ray loses his eyeballs in his messy room, the other members of First Squad have to go on without him.
23b	23b	"Porcupine Castle"	Kent Redeker	Leah Waldron	March 31, 2010	123b
HighRoller and the Zebra Brothers capture Big Green's Air Force at the Spikey Mountains in a plot to give First Squad a humiliating defeat with the help of the Porcupine King. Meanwhile, Mystique Sonia and Mighty Ray are disagreeing with each other due to Mighty Ray claiming that Mystique Sonia's buns "taste like dirt", much to Lin Chung's annoyance.
24a	24a	"Sheep Castle"	Kent Redeker	Luke Cormican	April 1, 2010	124a
The Sheep have trapped Commander ApeTrully in wool sweaters that shrunk on him when it got wet. Due to Mystique Sonia's paper-cutting accident on a sleeping Jumpy Ghostface caused by Yaksha's jealousy which resulted in Jumpy losing some of his fur, First Squad must rescue Commander ApeTrully without him. The Sheep also trap First Squad with wool sweaters that shrink when they get wet, but Baboon King comes to their rescue with his washers to get rid of the sheep's oils, making them shrink.
24b	24b	"Penguin Castle"	Kent Redeker	Tom Nesbitt	April 1, 2010	124b
A bad day gives First Squad a hard time when dealing with the Penguins. When First Squad fails the Ice Bowling challenge, they end up going up against their Mirror Clones summoned by Penguin King from a piece of the Northern Lights. However, they find that their mirror clones do exactly what they do so Penguin King creates an army of mirror Penguin clones which can be juggled to make them dizzy.
25a	25a	"Frog Castle"	Kent Redeker	Darin McGowan	April 2, 2010	125a
The Do-Re-Mi Band's latest concert ends up disrupted when news of the Frogs tormenting humans reaches Big Green. When the Frogs' music is too much for First Squad, The Do-Re-Mi Band is called in to help fight the Frogs.
25b	25b	"Cheetah Castle II"	Kent Redeker	Tom Nesbitt	April 2, 2010	125b
After hearing of a group of Cocky Aliens attacking Cheetah Castle and trapping its inhabitants in a crystal barrier, HighRoller plans to trick them to his side in a plot to defeat Big Green. This backfires, though, as the Cocky Aliens take control of his body, as well as the Zebra Brothers and Bearstomp.
26	26	"Pitched Battle of the Air Force"	Kent Redeker	Mark Maxey (Part I) David Earl (Part II)	April 5, 2010	126
Inspired by Lin Chung's hybrid art of the animals on Big Green's side, HighRoller has the Bald Eagles, Bats, and Hens form the Ultimate Flying Force in an attempt to stop Big Green. Also inspired by Lin Chung's hybrid art, Woo the Wise invents a technology to combine animals which comes in handy when it comes to fighting HighRoller's Black Dragon, which is actually a puppet operated by the Bald Eagles. After defeating the Black Dragon, Mighty Ray messes with Woo the Wise's invention, which results in a monstrous creature made of HighRoller, the Zebra Brothers, Bearstomp and some Bald Eagles, which captures Mighty Ray, Mystique Sonia and Jumpy Ghostface. Lin Chung saves them, defeats the creature, which returns HighRoller and his minions to normal, and Woo the Wise destroys his invention because it's too dangerous.

=== Season 2 (2012) ===
No. overall	No. in season	Title	Written by	Storyboarded by	Original release date	Prod. code	
27	1	"The Rise of Lin Chung"	Thomas Pugsley, Greg Klein, and Kent Redeker	Atomic Cartoons and Fred Reyes	May 6, 2012	June 4, 2012	201
During a battle with the Firefly Army, Lin Chung has visions about his late master Tien Kwan, telling him to complete his training. After the battle, Lin Chung leaves First Squad and HighRoller goes to talk with his own master, Twin Masters. Tien Kwan teaches Lin Chung to discover and use new powers called "Harmonic Energy". After that, he goes to help his friends and Second Squad member Kowloon (who was filling in for him) against HighRoller, who has once again captured Commander ApeTrully. After Command ApeTrully is freed, Twin Masters appears and blasts HighRoller far away for his failures and throws a negative energy ball inside the volcano making it erupt. Lin Chung realizes that he must use his new power to turn the negative into positive energy, and uses this knowledge to stop the volcano, turning it into a large purple crystal. Commander ApeTrully and Mr. No Hands decide that Lin Chung should be the new leader of First Squad. In the end, Twin Masters talks to himself about his future plans.
28a	2a	"Terra Cotta Warriors"	Eugene Son	Atomic Cartoons and Fred Reyes	May 7, 2012	June 5, 2012	202a
Woo the Wise invents a device in an attempt to cure Mr. No Hands' self tickling. It appears to succeed, and Mighty Ray struggles to think up a new name for him. The Zebra Brothers set up a trap to lure out First Squad before using their lanterns to create a Terracotta army. During the battle Mr. No Hands gradually loses control of his hands.
28b	2b	"Punch & Kick"	John Tellegen	Atomic Cartoons and Fred Reyes	May 7, 2012	June 5, 2012	202b
Mystique Sonia and Mighty Ray have a big argument after which Mystique Sonia leaves the Big Green base and is ambushed and captured by the Zebra Brothers with the Gorilla & Kangaroo Kings.
29a	3a	"Stingray"	Eugene Son	Kenneth Laramay	May 8, 2012	June 6, 2012	203a
The Zebra Brothers get caught dumping garbage in the ocean by the Stingray Warriors, but they manage to frame First Squad when they are sent out to clear up the mess.
29b	3b	"Pangolin Castle"	Tony Schillaci	Clint Taylor	May 8, 2012	June 6, 2012	203b
The Pangolin Queen is capturing humans to keep as pets and captures Commander ApeTrully. First Squad are sent to rescue him. Mystique Sonia tries to keep a Raccoon named Black-eye as a pet but Mighty Ray is sceptical about this because he thinks Black-eye ate his Peanut butter when it was actually Yaksha.
30a	4a	"The Lizard King"	Thomas Pugsley and Greg Klein	David Schwartz	May 9, 2012	June 7, 2012	204a
The Lizard King pretends to join Big Green. First squad get upset over Lin Chung's artistic impressions of them and Woo the Wise invents a 4D image creator. While Lin Chung is training outside of Big Green, however, The Lizard king uses Woo's 4D image creator combined with his freezing powers to capture First squad so he can turn them over to Twin Masters.
30b	4b	"Prince of Seagulls"	Thomas Pugsley and Greg Klein	Tom Nesbitt	May 9, 2012	June 7, 2012	204b
The Seagulls join Big Green, but the King is disappointed by his son, so First Squad take it upon themselves to train him. Later First Squad goes and battles the Flying Squirrel Army, with help from the Seagulls. In the end, Seagull Prince lures them into a tree and Lin Chung traps them in with a rock.
31a	5a	"The Fruiter"	John Tellegen	Stephen Sandoval	May 10, 2012	June 8, 2012	205a
The Zebra brothers poison Mystique Sonia while First Squad are fighting the Wasp army. She starts to grow hair uncontrollably, so First Squad go to find the antidote from the Humbada trees that no one has ever found before. HighRoller send the Barbets to follow them. First Squad fights the Barbets and lets them join Big Green and they get the sap and give it to Mystique Sonia. Unfortunately, this causes all her hair to fall out.
31b	5b	"Star Nosed Moles"	Thomas Pugsley and Greg Klein	Atomic Cartoons	May 10, 2012	June 8, 2012	205b
ApeTrully has a nightmare about First Squad disbanding if they discover he's the Monkey King due to Crab King betraying Big Green, so he decides to wear a suit of armor instead of his usual disguise. He goes with First Squad to investigate some human disappearances caused by a group of Star-nosed moles who are covered in mud.
32	6	"Big Baby Turtles"	Nicole Dubuc	Peter Ferk and Theron Smith (Part I) John Eng and Tim Maltby (Part II)	May 11, 2012	June 11, 2012	206
First Squad fail to retrieve the Owl amulet from the Zebra brothers after their turtles get tired. First Squad decide to give the Turtles a vacation, but they run away from Big Green. HighRoller uses the Owl Amulet, which combined with Twin Masters power, turns the Turtles into giant monsters while Mighty Ray himself turns into a Turtle after swallowing one of their eggs.
33a	7a	"Shadow Monster"	John Tellegen	John Eng and Kenneth Laramay	May 14, 2012	June 12, 2012	207a
The Zebra Brothers use their lanterns to create a shadow monster which steals First Squad's powers and Commander ApeTrully's ability to speak fluently. They have to race to get their powers back before they are transferred to HighRoller.
33b	7b	"Duo Cannon"	Thomas Pugsley and Greg Klein	Alex Basio and Eduardo Soriano	May 14, 2012	June 12, 2012	207b
HighRoller uses the Rock Caterpillars silk to create an impenetrable shell on anything covered by it and plans to use it on First Squad. Woo the Wise invents a corn machine gun, which Mighty Ray uses and accidentally destroys one of the Turtle's shells. First Squad then have to fight the Chameleon tanks which all have HighRollers new coating for ammunition.
34a	8a	"Second to None"	Kent Redeker	Scott Jeralds and Fred Reyes	May 15, 2012	June 13, 2012	208a
First and Second Squad start fighting over who is best, again. First Squad is sent to fight the Flying Squirrel Army while Second Squad is sent to fight the Yaks. All heck breaks loose when Second Squad get possessed by Twin Master's chaos energy.
34b	8b	"The Hamster King"	Thomas Pugsley and Greg Klein	Tom Nesbitt	May 15, 2012	June 13, 2012	208b
The Zebra Brothers trick Hamster King into fighting First Squad by making him believe First Squad harm children. Mighty Ray is ordered to be the baby turtle's babysitter while the adult turtles are away.
35a	9a	"The Return of the Pterodactyls"	Thomas Pugsley and Greg Klein	Clint Taylor	May 16, 2012>	June 14, 2012	209a
The Bald Eagles turn into Pterodactyls and gain the ability to turn anything they hit with the purple goop they spit into prehistoric versions of themselves. Jumpy Ghostface gets turned into a prehistoric rabbit while First Squad, the Air Force and Tank Army try to fight off the Pterodactyls.
35b	9b	"White Crane"	Thomas Pugsley and Greg Klein	Alex Basio and Scott Jeralds	May 16, 2012	June 14, 2012	209b
The Zebra Brothers turn Lin, No Hands, Ray and Jumpy into girls and also makes their personalities more passive. They then trick the Crane King into thinking First Squad want to pluck the Crane's feathers to make dresses with.
36	10	"The Eyes of Mighty Ray"	Nicole Dubuc	Vic Dal Chele and Chuck Patton (Part I) Rafael Rosado and Eduardo Soriano (Part II)	May 17, 2012	June 15, 2012	210
Mighty Ray's eyes are stolen by the Flying Fish army and given to Twin Masters, who uses them to create a storm of chaos energy. First Squad return to where Mighty Ray first received his eyes to restore his connection to them, before they can stop Twin Masters plan: to create a deadly chaotic storm which turns anything its lightning hits into monster versions of themselves. First Squad thwarts Twin Masters' plan by feeding Mighty Ray lots of bananas to overload his eyes (Just like he did when he was about to take down HighRoller one time). Note: This episode reveals the origins of Mighty Ray and Mr. No Hands.
37a	11a	"Animal Collector"	Tony Schillaci	Tim Maltby and Fred Reyes	May 18, 2012	June 18, 2012	211a
The Slug King is capturing animals and humans to keep in his collection. Sparky White is captured, so Sparky Black asks First Squad to help him after HighRoller refuses to help him. When Commander ApeTrully, the tank army and most of first squad are also captured, Lin Chung and mighty Ray use come citrus fruits to dissolve the Slug King's slime he uses to hold his collected victims. After all of Slug King's collected people are freed, the Zebra brothers use their ghost lanterns to create a slime monster which traps everyone (including the Zebra brothers) in its belly except Mighty Ray and Lin Chung. They defeat it by having it trap Lin Chung so he can use his harmonic energy to protect everyone from Mighty Ray's blasts.
37b	11b	"Resurrection of T-Rex"	Thomas Pugsley and Greg Klein	Scott Jeralds, Thomas Riggin, and Rafael Rosado	May 18, 2012	June 18, 2012	211b
Mighty Ray and Crocodile King start arguing about who is better and have a competition to find out who is the best blaster in Hidden Kingdom. Twin Masters resurrects a T-Rex and a caveman to fight First Squad. When First Squad fight them, the T-Rex and the caveman become First Squad's friends when Lin Chung saves Crocodile King. However, they still have to deal with Twin Masters.
38a	12a	"Revenge of the Commander of Darkness"	Eric Trueheart	Patrick Archibald and John Eng	May 21, 2012	June 19, 2012	212a
Using earwax harvested from a Giant Centipede, the Commander of Darkness transforms his minions into six-armed giants and disguises himself as the Koala King in an attempt to take revenge on First Squad when they arrive to ask the Koala King to join Big Green.
38b	12b	"The Sword of Dark Fire"	Kent Redeker	Peter Ferk and Melissa Suber	May 21, 2012	June 19, 2012	212b
The Sword of Darknesses' location is revealed so First Squad with the Air Force have to hurry to stop it falling into the wrong hands. First Squad finds that HighRoller (without the Zebra Brothers) is trying to get the Sword before First Squad, with Beetle King as his sidekick. Ultimately, the Sword is sucked into a vortex and Beetle King joins Big Green while HighRoller is chased away by Wolf Eels.
39a	13a	"Enter the Dragon"	Thomas Pugsley and Greg Klein	Ashley Lenz and Fred Reyes	May 22, 2012	June 20, 2012	213a
The Commander of Darkness manages to take control of the Dragons and kidnaps Mystique Sonia. First Squad and the Air Force go to rescue her using upgraded Planes that shoot water to counter the Dragons' fire. Mystique Sonia escapes from the Commander of Darkness' clutches by charming the Mother Dragon with her flute.
39b	13b	"Ninja Fight"	Thomas Pugsley and Greg Klein	John Eng and Olaf Miller	May 22, 2012	June 20, 2012	213b
Spotter the Rabbit attacks Rabbit Castle with the Mantis army to try and take the throne from Jumpy Ghostface, as well as holding several rabbits hostage. He demands a 1-on-1 fight with Jumpy, but First Squad turn up anyway and with the help of the Beetle army, fight off the Mantis while Jumpy fights Spotter.
40a	14a	"Fox King and the Arachno Tanks"	Thomas Pugsley and Greg Klein	Tom Nesbitt and Rafael Rosado	May 23, 2012	June 21, 2012	214a
HighRoller kidnaps Fox King's Family, and commands Fox King and Spider King to attack First Squad.
40b	14b	"The Ghost Ship"	Thomas Pugsley and Greg Klein	Clint Taylor	May 23, 2012	June 21, 2012	214b
After a hypnotic sound on the Octopus and Stingray King, First Squad goes to look at what hypnotized them. But then they find a Lantern Fish who hypnotizes the Sea Kings and captured Commander ApeTrully. While First Squad is rescuing Commander ApeTrully, Mystique Sonia is uncomfortable when they are joined by the Big Green Navy's best warrior, Lady Green.
41a	15a	"Jellyfish Jam"	Nicole Dubuc	Scott Jeralds and Mark Howard	May 24, 2012	June 22, 2012	215a
While sealing up volcanic vents in the ocean, First Squad is shrunken down to size by some Jellyfish and captured by the Zebra Brothers. Upon First Squad being brought to HighRoller, it is shown that the Jellyfish are actually tiny aquatic humanoids led by Yan Ching who have been tricked by HighRoller. When Yan Ching joins Big Green, he calls it "Little Green", to which Mighty Ray replies by correcting him, which he thinks doesn't matter. It is unknown how First Squad got back to their normal size.
41b	15b	"Demon Heartland"	Nicole Dubuc	Joe Sichta and Eduardo Soriano	May 24, 2012	June 22, 2012	215b
Under the orders of Twin Masters, HighRoller sends the Sea Elephant Army and the Hermit Crab Army to a secret island to recover Twin Masters' heart. At the same time when First Squad and the Infantry are out to destroy Twin Master's heart, Mystique Sonia has some doubts about Yan Ching. When First Squad finds Twin Masters' heart, it is revealed to be a chaotic bomb.
42a	16a	"Leech King"	Matt Wayne	Andrew Austin and Rick Hoberg	May 25, 2012	June 25, 2012	216a
The leeches invade Big Green and impersonate most of First Squad, the King of Lions and Commander ApeTrully. Only Lin Chung and Yaksha can put a stop to it.
42b	16b	"The Third Squad"	Thomas Pugsley and Greg Klein	Alex Que and Fred Reyes	May 25, 2012	June 25, 2012	216b
HighRoller uses the Amulets of Chi Gong to fuse several captured Cheetahs, Oxen, and Pythons with himself, Bearstomp, and the Zebra Brothers creating his own equivalent to First Squad (who once again sides with Second Squad). As Lin Chung and Alpha Girl go after HighRoller, the others steal the Amulets of Chi Gong and fuse with each other as well. They defeat HighRoller by using the Amulets to fuse him with the Zebra Brothers, much to his annoyance.
43a	17a	"The Seahorse Temptation"	Nicole Dubuc	Larry Houston and Clint Taylor	May 28, 2012	June 26, 2012	217a
The Seahorses, after helping First Squad to defeat Flying Fish army, join Big Green to give them special fighting abilities. But are they planning something evil? It turns out they are as HighRoller has got another Seahorse and both are feeding off their negative energy and handing it to Twin Masters.
43b	17b	"Sloth King"	Dean Stefan	Larry Houston and Ashley Lenz	May 28, 2012	June 26, 2012	217b
Something really fast attacks the human village but no one has seen what. The First Squad sets out traps to find out who's attacking the humans. Meanwhile, Mystique Sonia has taken some advice from Crane King (Chanting "Power, Energy, Power") to become faster, but she continuously abuses it.
44	18	"Animals Inside"	Nicole Dubuc	Llyn Hunter and Stephen Sandoval (Part I) Scott Jeralds and Douglas Lovelace (Part II)	May 29, 2012	June 27, 2012	218
Commander ApeTrully receives a message that an unknown animal king wants to join Big Green. But, it's a trick and they are ambushed by the Bearstomp and his Bears. When First Squad fights the Bears, the Zebra brothers capture ApeTrully and bring him to the East Citadel. Lin Chung, Mystique Sonia and Mighty Ray come up with a plan to infiltrate East Citadel by using the Spirit Cave to become their inner animals (A Panther, a Swan and a Boar, respectively). Even if they find Commander ApeTrully, they also would have to fight Twin Masters who was also involved in Commander ApeTrully's capture, as well as their toughest opponent yet, Commander ApeTrully (because Twin Masters blasted him with a huge amount of chaotic energy).
45a	19a	"The Dark Below"	Thomas Pugsley and Greg Klein	Barry Caldwell and Eric McConnell	May 30, 2012	June 28, 2012	219a
Twin Masters hires the Oyster-Rahmas to widen a trench at the bottom of the ocean in an attempt to drain Hidden Kingdom's oceans. Upon enlisting Lantern Fish King's help, First Squad, Commander ApeTrully, the Sailor Brothers, Sammo the Whale, and Lady Green go underwater to stop Twin Masters.
45b	19b	"Gladiators"	Dean Stefan	Rick Hoberg and Olaf Miller	May 30, 2012	June 28, 2012	219b
First Squad, Bearstomp and some other people get kidnapped and are forced to fight like gladiators for a Minotaur's enjoyment. Even when they make their escape, they must navigate through the labyrinth while evading the Minotaur's minions.
46a	20a	"Monster Castle"	Thomas Pugsley and Greg Klein	Ashley Lenz, Joe Sichta, and Eduardo Soriano	May 31, 2012	June 29, 2012	220a
After Jumpy Ghostface is zapped by Twin Masters, Jumpy's dreams start coming to life and Jumpy Ghostface's dreams are mostly about evil monsters (consisting of Moosey Ghostface and Tri-Puppy) and a dream version of Beastomp. Jumpy Ghostface banishes the dream monsters by dreaming up a giant version of himself and forcing them back to Woo the Wise's new invention that sends the monsters back to the dream world.
46b	20b	"The Yeti & Phoenix"	Thomas Pugsley and Greg Klein	Andrew Austin and Larry Houston	May 31, 2012	June 29, 2012	220b
Lin Chung has lost his power of Harmonic energy while battling the Twin Masters after a fight with Twin Masters' enhanced Gila Monsters and speaks to Tien Kwan. Meanwhile, Twin Masters turns Polar Bear King into a Yeti and Bald Eagle King into a Phoenix so they can destroy First Squad. Lin Chung regains his harmonic energy from the other members of First Squad and uses it to return Polar bear king and Bald Eagle King to normal, much to Twin Masters' dismay. Note: This is the episode where Big Green finally makes peace with the Bald Eagles.
47a	21a	"Collision Course"	Thomas Pugsley and Greg Klein	Tom Nesbitt	June 1, 2012	July 2, 2012	221a
Twin Masters controls an asteroid to crash in Hidden Kingdom. First Squad has to go to space with Woo the Wise's new invention, a space rocket.
47b	21b	"Cyber Animals"	Thomas Pugsley and Greg Klein	Clint Taylor and Fred Reyes	June 1, 2012	July 2, 2012	221b
HighRoller teams up with his old school friend (who was also a rival of Woo the Wise) to create robot versions of Groundhog King and his Groundhog Army to destroy First Squad. Woo the Wise also takes part in the fight where he duels his high school rival.
48a	22a	"Roto-Wolves"	Thomas Pugsley and Greg Klein	Llyn Hunter and Alex Que	June 4, 2012	July 3, 2012	222a
Lin Chung is lost in the forest after the Air Force's fight with Roto-Wolves. With Mr. No Hands on a mission, the rest of the First Squad has to find him now in the Roto-Wolves' forest.
48b	22b	"Teammates"	Kent Redeker	Mark Howard and Eric McConnell	June 4, 2012	July 3, 2012	222b
Mr. No Hands trains the rest of First Squad in a forest to build up their teamwork skills. Meanwhile, Twin Masters turns ants into big ants to activate the magma inside the earth to destroy the Hidden Kingdom. Mystique Sonia and Mighty Ray get lost in the ants' underground tunnels and must work together to return to the surface.
49a	23a	"HighRoller Hydra"	Thomas Pugsley and Greg Klein	Llyn Hunter, Scott Jeralds, and Chuck Patton	June 5, 2012	July 4, 2012	223a
After HighRoller stole a powerful Orb from a temple, he turns himself into a Hydra so he can destroy Big Green and First Squad. Later, HighRoller thinks that with his new powerful body and powers he can destroy Twin Masters. HighRoller goes and fights with Twin Masters. In the end, Twin Masters says that the day of Wreckining is coming soon.
49b	23b	"Time to Go Home"	Thomas Pugsley and Greg Klein	Rick Hoberg and Chuck Patton	June 5, 2012	July 4, 2012	223b
Lin Chung is blasted in a fire tornado by Twin Masters which sends him 1000 years in the past. In the past of Hidden Kingdom, it is revealed that Lin Chung was responsible for the rise of Twin Masters, as Twin Masters was once a human named Prince Yang Tu, who wanted complete and total control of the Hidden Kingdom. Lin Chung tried to prevent Yang Tu from walking the path of evil. Unfortunately, instead of changing Yang Tu's fate, Lin Chung became the one that caused Yang Tu to become the Twin Masters we all know, thus creating a time paradox.
50a	24a	"Marine Mine"	Thomas Pugsley and Greg Klein	Frank Forte and Douglas Lovelace	June 6, 2012	July 5, 2012	224a
HighRoller plans to attack Big Green with the Blowfish army, and his plan is to sink Big Green under the ocean.
50b	24b	"About Faces"	Thomas Pugsley and Greg Klein	Barry Caldwell and Llyn Hunter	June 6, 2012	July 5, 2012	224b
HighRoller uses a transference sceptre to switch bodies with Lin Chung. While Lin Chung is HighRoller, he hears about Twin Masters' plan that the Hidden Kingdom can't unite to fight with him when he will be at his full power and it's coming soon. Will First Squad find out that Lin Chung isn't Lin Chung?
51a	25a	"The Professionals"	Thomas Pugsley and Greg Klein	Tom Nesbitt and Alex Que	June 7, 2012	July 6, 2012	225a
Twin Masters tells HighRoller to kidnap First Squad. While HighRoller enlists Yak King, Lizard King, and the Flying Squirrels to attack Big Green, he doesn't know that Twin Masters also got some bounty hunters to do it. When the bounty hunters successfully capture First Squad, HighRoller plans to capture First Squad from them as he will not let them take the credit for First Squad's capture.
51b	25b	"Swamp Hippos"	Richard Pursel and Paul Kozlowski	Scott Jeralds and Fred Reyes	June 7, 2012	July 6, 2012	225b
The Swamp Hippos start terrorizing villages and blame the Dogs. So First Squad and Wu Sung have to stop them. At the same time, Wu Sung tells First Squad that his brother Dog King hasn't been comfortable living amongst humans. When First Squad defeats the Swamp hippos, the Swamp Hippo King tells them that Twin Masters put 2 chaotic gems in his mouth.
52	26	"The Bronze Giant"	Thomas Pugsley and Greg Klein	Tim Maltby and Rafael Rosado (Part I) Larry Houston and Clint Taylor (Part II)	June 8, 2012	July 9, 2012	226
When Twin Masters plans to get the ultimate power for himself, Lin Chung feels it and tells all of Big Green about his plan. Woo the Wise remakes Big Green Base like a turtle so Big Green can both walk and shoot projectiles, hoping it will be enough to destroy Twin Masters. In the forest, Big Green is stopped by HighRoller, Chameleon Queen, the Zebra Brothers, and Bearstomp, keeping First Squad from stopping Twin Masters. First Squad goes into Twin Masters' cave but they are too late because he has broken the shell and evolved. He now has a new body and is more powerful than ever. Twin Masters shoots and destroys Big Green Base. All hopes of defeating Twin Masters are gone, until Lin Chung talks to Tien Kwan and he draws a Bronze Giant without thinking. Bronze Giant is a combination of all the heroes of Hidden Kingdom. It's Hero 108 and it has to have 107 Animal King/Queens and the Heroes of Big Green to combine it. Twin Masters starts destroying Hidden Kingdom and says that he will destroy all life and even HighRoller. After that, the Zebra Brothers, Bearstomp, Chameleon Queen, and Seahorse Prince join Big Green to form the Bronze Giant. After they have formed it, they go to finish off Twin Masters before they have destroyed the Hidden Kingdom. Later the Bronze Giant absorbs all the positive energy from Hero 108 and it causes Twin Masters to explode, killing him and avenging Big Green Base's destruction. With Twin Masters' reign of terror finally put to an end, everyone is happy and peace with the humans and animals is restored. But HighRoller, the Zebra Brothers, and Bearstomp go back to the East Citadel (a.k.a. Bear Castle) because they don't want to stay with the heroes. Commander ApeTrully then says it is time to rebuild Big Green. The series ends with Tien Kwan telling Lin Chung that many challenges lay ahead for Big Green and Lin telling his master that they will always be ready.
