= Norm of the North =

2016 animated film by Trevor Wall

- Theatrical release poster
- Directed by: Trevor Wall
- Written by: Daniel R. Altiere; Steven M. Altiere; Malcolm T. Goldman
- Produced by: Nicolas Atlan; Ken Katsumoto; Steve Rosen; Liz Young; Mike Young
- Starring: Rob Schneider; Heather Graham; Ken Jeong; Colm Meaney; Loretta Devine; Gabriel Iglesias; Michael McElhatton; Bill Nighy
- Edited by: Richard Finn
- Music by: Stephen McKeon
- Production companies: Splash Entertainment; Assemblage Entertainment; Telegael
- Distributed by: Lionsgate (United States); Signature Entertainment (Ireland)
- Release date: January 15, 2016
- Running time: 90 minutes
- Countries: United States; Ireland
- Language: English
- Budget: $7-18 million
- Box office: $30.5 million

Norm of the North is a 2016 animated adventure comedy film directed by Trevor Wall. The film features the voices of Rob Schneider, Heather Graham, Ken Jeong, Colm Meaney, Loretta Devine, Gabriel Iglesias, Michael McElhatton, and Bill Nighy, and is an international co-production of the United States and Ireland.

Norm of the North was theatrically released in the United States on January 15, 2016, by Lionsgate. The film received overwhelmingly negative reviews from critics, with criticism going towards its animation, humor and plot. Despite this, the film grossed $30 million against a budget of $7–18M. It spawned three direct-to-video sequels: Norm of the North: Keys to the Kingdom, Norm of the North: King Sized Adventure, and Norm of the North: Family Vacation.

== Plot ==
Norm, a polar bear, is the son of the King of the Arctic. In his youth, he realizes his ability to speak to humans, a trait shared only by his grandfather. Because of this, he is made an outcast from the other animals, only being accepted by Socrates, a wise seagull, and Elizabeth, a female polar bear whom Norm is in love with.

Years later, Norm's grandfather has disappeared, and human tourists are filling the Arctic. Socrates shows Norm and three Arctic lemmings a luxury condo that has been installed on the ice. Inside this condo is Vera, a representative for wealthy developer Mr. Greene. After Vera is saved by Norm from an avalanche, Mr. Greene calls her to find a polar bear mascot for their commercial, campaigning to sell houses at the Arctic. Alarmed, Socrates convinces Norm and the lemmings to stow away on a ship to New York City.

In the city, Norm, pretending to be an actor dressed as a polar bear, auditions for Mr. Greene's commercial and is taken to dinner by Vera. Mr. Greene, who realizes that Norm is a real bear, suspects that Norm has come to free his grandfather, whom he has captured. He confronts him at the restaurant with a tranquilizer gun, but Norm subdues him. After the outburst garners the media's attention and heightens Mr. Greene's approval ratings, however, he decides to hire Norm as his mascot.

Before going on a television show, Norm meets Vera's genius daughter Olympia, who knows that Norm is a real bear, and advises him to wait for the right moment to speak out against Mr. Greene and his campaign so he can save the Arctic. Norm's popularity further increases the approval ratings, but his plan is sabotaged by Mr. Greene, who uses recorded dialogue to claim that Norm supports his developments.

Defeated, Norm is comforted by Vera and Olympia, who reveal that Mr. Greene is developing more homes to install in the Arctic. He and the lemmings discover that Mr. Greene is bribing a high-ranking member of the Polar Council, and exposes this to Pablo, one of Greene's investors. Vera resigns her position and is hired by Pablo, while Norm and the lemmings chase the truck holding the houses.

The animal control sends the truck carrying Norm's grandfather, and Norm is captured as well. After being freed by the lemmings, Norm and his grandfather get to the boat carrying the houses to the Arctic, and they are able to detach the houses, but Norm gets separated from his grandfather.

Norm awakens in the Arctic and is reunited with the lemmings and the other animals. Because of his heroism, Norm is crowned the King of the Arctic, but not before his grandfather arrives. Meanwhile, Mr. Greene's reputation is ruined after his bribery is publicly revealed, Vera and Olympia are happy with Pablo as their new boss, and Norm and Elizabeth later get married, and have three cubs together named Maria, Chase, and Quinn.

== Cast ==
- Rob Schneider as Norm. Ken Katsumoto stated that the film's writing and production team wanted Norm to be like Rudolph the Red-Nosed Reindeer; much like how Rudolph perceived his red nose as a disadvantage for him but later helped Santa and saved Christmas, Norm sees his ability to communicate with humans as a negative, but it later ultimately saves the Arctic from Mr. Greene. According to Lionsgate's press release, Schneider was cast by the producers for the role of Norm due to his "vocal warmth and spot-on comedic instincts". Katsumoto explained that they "immediately fell in love with Rob's voice. His vocal dexterity was amazing. He also did a great job of embellishing lines to make them funnier. Many of those ad-libs made it into the film". As Schneider himself described Norm: "I always play the guy you can laugh at and say, 'My life's not that great, but look at that guy!' I think in this movie, other bears look at Norm that way. No one takes him seriously, but he follows his heart and it ends up saving their home. It's fun to play somebody who tries to achieve something big and ends up getting rewarded because he's not doing it for himself. That's a nice lesson for kids".
- Heather Graham as Vera Brightly. The producers listened through numerous actress auditions for the part of Vera, looking for, in Katsumoto's words, a performance that was "fierce but sensitive at the same time".
- Ken Jeong as Mr. Greene. Jeong voiced Mr. Greene because he wanted to show his twin daughters a film that he starred in: "Most of the movies I do I can't show my kids yet. With Norm of the North, they'll finally be able to watch one of Daddy's movies. That was kind of a big incentive for me to be part of this project". Katsumoto explained why Jeong was chosen for the role: "We fell in love with the fact that Ken can be villainous and likable at the same time. He's got incredible comic timing and spontaneity. Ken also has a lot of great subtext in his voice. Some people at advance screenings of the movie have cited Mr. Greene as their favorite character. That's rare for a villain". Jeong described Mr. Greene as "a 50-year-old billionaire with a ponytail, and that's pretty much all you need to know. He's this misguided person who starts out with good intentions. He loves to meditate. He tries to incorporate these New Age concepts into his thinking until things go horribly awry".
- Maya Kay as Olympia Brightly, Vera's teenage daughter. Kay previously did voice acting for another animated film by Lionsgate, Alpha and Omega (2010). Kay said that she enjoyed voicing the character and working with Graham: "I was super excited to have Heather Graham play my mom – just like Vera, she's one of the sweetest people you'll ever meet". She also explained that "it was really awesome to play somebody so smart, with good intentions to help Norm save his home".
- Colm Meaney as Norm's grandfather
- Loretta Devine as Tamecia
- Gabriel Iglesias as Pablo and Stan
- Michael McElhatton (US) and James Corden (UK) as Laurence
- Bill Nighy as Socrates, an intelligent seagull
- Salome Jens as Councilwoman Klubeck
- Charlie Adler as Forebear
- G.K. Bowes as Female Tourist
- Debi Derryberry as Daughter
- Ben Diskin as Chef Kozawa
- Keith Ferguson as Human Tourist
- Dan Gordon as Nigel, Henchman #1, PA
- Jess Harnell as Male Tourist
- Kate Higgins as Elizabeth
- Mikey Kelley as Henchman #2
- Rove McManus as Junior Investor
- Emily Polydoros as Bratty Girl
- Eric Price as Caribou #1, Caribou #2
- Nick Shakoour as Costumed Bear
- Max Spitz as Teen Bear #1
- Janet Varney as Janet
- Rick D. Wasserman as Henchman #3
- James Corden as Employee #1

Director Trevor Wall provides the voice for the three main lemmings in the film, although he is not credited. As Nicolas Atlan described the lemmings: "We thought it would be hysterical to combine Norm, the largest creature in the Arctic, with lemmings that are small and indestructible. They can get squashed, they can get stomped on, they can have an elevator close on them, but like Silly Putty, they bounce right back into their original shape".

== Development and production ==
Lionsgate and Crest Animation Studios announced the project in February 2010, as part of a three-film deal between both parties. Steven and Daniel Altiere were set to write the film, based on their own original story. The same year in July, Rob Schneider was cast in the film as the titular character, with Ken Jeong and Loretta Devine also being cast around the same time. Anthony Bell, who previously co-directed Alpha and Omega, was originally set to direct the film, but ultimately left the project after Crest Animation Studios filed for bankruptcy and closed its doors in 2015. The film sat in development hell for over four years, until Splash Entertainment took over production (as the studio's first project from its feature animation unit) with Good Universe handling international sales. That same year, the film added Bill Nighy, Gabriel Iglesias, Colm Meaney and Michael McElhatton to the cast, and Trevor Wall was hired to direct. Ginny McSwain was hired to voice direct Jeong's lines and was only given a limited amount of time to prepare. She described her time working on the film as unbearable and found Jeong, whom she initially admired, very off putting and rude to work with.

== Marketing ==
Two mobile apps were released to promote the film as well as four clips on Lionsgate's YouTube channel and two theatrical trailers. Television commercials were played on several channels.

== Reception ==
=== Box office and release ===
Norm of the North grossed $17 million in North America and $13.5 million in other territories, for a worldwide total of $30.5 million, against a budget of anywhere from $7-18 million.

The film was released on January 15, 2016, alongside 13 Hours: The Secret Soldiers of Benghazi and Ride Along 2 and was projected to gross around $5 million for its first four days. It grossed $9.3 million from 2,411 theaters over its opening four-day Martin Luther King Jr. Day weekend, finishing 6th at the box office and beating modest projections.

International pre-sale rights to the film were acquired by Good Universe, who pre-sold the film to distributors across the world, including Signature Entertainment in the United Kingdom and Ireland.

=== Home media ===
Norm of the North was released on DVD, Blu-ray, and digital HD on April 19, 2016.

=== Critical response ===
On Rotten Tomatoes, the film has an approval rating of 6% based on 70 reviews and an average rating of 3.10/10. The site's critical consensus read: "A pioneering feat in the field of twerking polar bear animation but blearily retrograde in every other respect, Norm of the North should only be screened in case of parental emergency". Shortly after its theatrical release on January 15, 2016, it temporarily had a rating of 0% on Rotten Tomatoes based on 35 reviews at the time. On Metacritic, as of August 2020, the film had a score of 21 out of 100, based on 18 critics, indicating "generally unfavorable" reviews. Audiences polled by CinemaScore gave the film an average grade of "B−" on an A+ to F scale.

Critic Mark Dujsik gave the film 1 out of 4 possible stars, writing that "Norm of the North doesn't care about the environment, the animals of the Arctic, or even kids for that matter. It wants to be 'cute and marketable' as cheaply as possible". James White of Empire gave the film 1 out of 5 possible stars, writing that "we wouldn't recommend you watch it even after you've burned through every other possibility – and that includes a blank screen". Mark Kermode of The Observer called the film a "dull ... below-par Ice Age-style tale in which the highlight is a group of vulgar lemmings". Michael Rechtshaffen of the Los Angeles Times called the film "blandly uninspired", and Soren Andersen of The Seattle Times called the film an "idiotic animated comedy", writing that "no child should be exposed to this".

Geoff Berkshire of Variety called the film a "blandly executed pic" that "will quickly head south to an ancillary afterlife". Katie Rife of The A.V. Club gave the film a "D" grade, writing that "this is a movie for children. But using that as a justification for lazy work, as if kids are inherently too dumb to know the difference, isn't just condescending. In a post-Pixar world, where audiences have become accustomed to quality animated family films, it's a waste of money". Stephen Schaefer of the Boston Herald gave the film a grade of "B−", writing that, despite being "hardly original ... 'Norm' has oodles of charm, a razor-sharp wit, and pacing that should keep even preschoolers attentive".

Edwin L. Carpenter of The Dove Foundation gave the film its Family-Approved seal, writing that "your kids will enjoy Norm's company–he's funny and a role model for doing the right thing".

== Sequels ==
Following the release of the film, three direct-to-video sequels were released. Norm of the North: Keys to the Kingdom had a limited theatrical release in January 2019, with a home release on February 12. Norm of the North: King Sized Adventure was released for home release and on digital on June 11, 2019, while Norm of the North: Family Vacation was released on February 25, 2020.

Maya Kay is the only cast member to return for the sequels, while Norm is voiced by Andrew Toth.
