= MapleStory Adventures =

Social network game

- Developer: Nexon
- Publisher: Nexon America
- Platform: Facebook
- Release: July 27, 2011
- Genres: Fantasy, social game, massively multiplayer online role-playing game
- Mode: Single-player with asynchronous multiplayer interaction

MapleStory Adventures was a free-to-play, 2D, side-scrolling social network game developed by the South Korean company Nexon for Facebook and launched in July 2011. MapleStory Adventures was a simplified version of MapleStory's basic gameplay and included creating an avatar, fighting monsters and completing quests. Although the gameplay was altered for the social networking conventions and includes freemium content, the main storyline of the game remained the same. MapleStory Adventures was free to play, but players had the option of purchasing premium content. The game was shut down and removed from Facebook on July 31, 2013.

== Gameplay ==
MapleStory Adventures was a 2D scrolling social network game on Facebook. At the start of the game, players could create a customizable avatar and select a class. Players could choose to play as either a Warrior, a Magician, and a bowman/woman or thief. During the game, players could move anywhere they wished across a 2D side scrolling representation of "Maple World". The game was composed of "quests", which usually consisted of killing a certain number of monsters and collecting various items dropped from their corpses. Players could receive some quests automatically, and others could be obtained by clicking on various NPCs (Non-Player Characters). By clicking on a monster, the player delivered strikes which caused the monster a certain amount of damage, dependent upon the player's level and the equipment they wield. Each strike cost a certain amount of energy, drawn from a pool that slowly replenished in real time. Also, the energy bar decreased as the players took damage from monsters. As players leveled up, the energy gauge was growing.

=== Levels and skills ===
When a player killed a monster, various items were dropped from the corpse. These included blue stars, which could be collected to increase a player's experience level, quest items, collection items, gold coins, and "mystery boxes". As a player's level increased, they could purchase better weapons, challenge stronger monsters, obtain more crafting cauldrons, and more. As a player's experience level rose, their power increased and they could use gold coins to purchase various skills. For higher-leveled skills, players were required to obtain Skill Permits, available from monster drops and also from player's friends. Those skills were used to kill more difficult monsters in order to acquire better treasures.

=== Equipment and items ===
As a player leveled up, they had the opportunity to use gold coins to purchase various pieces of equipment that increased their attack power in the game. They could also purchase items that they had purely cosmetic rare value. Other items that dropped from monsters were a part of a "game collection". Collections were turned in for extra energy or other prizes at the shop. Monster collections, which were filled up as the players could slay more and more of those monsters allow them to get special powers over that monster such as the ability to tame it, the ability to summon it, and extra EXP from that monster.

Mystery boxes provided a random gift when opened. These gifts included a quantity of gold, consumables, or cosmetic clothing which did not increase attack power, and were for fashion only.

=== Map ===
MapleStory Adventures was played on a simplified version of Maple World. Areas in MapleStory Adventures that corresponded to those in the original MapleStory game included Henesys, Ellinia, Perion, Kerning City, Florina Beach and Skyscraper.

== Social interaction ==
Like other Facebook games, MapleStory Adventures incorporated social networking aspects into the gameplay. Players could invite their friends to become adventuring companions. When they accepted, each person could hire the other to fight alongside them in the game. This granted the players extra energy during monster battles.

=== Gifts ===
Players could send each other free gifts. These included items that provide extra energy, keys to open mystery boxes, or objects that allowed them to access higher level skills.

=== Linking ===
In the open beta phase of the game, players were allowed to link their MapleStory Adventures character to their PC version of MapleStory game to gain rewards for playing the Facebook version.

== Beta tests ==
Nexon America held a closed beta test for MapleStory Adventures from June 15 to June 26, 2011. Closed beta keys were given to those who completed a survey on the MapleStory Adventures Facebook page within a designated period. Each participant was given five keys and encouraged to use the extras to invite friends to play. Additional keys were also given out periodically to Facebook fans throughout the closed beta. After closed beta was finished, Nexon released MapleStory Adventures open beta on July 27.

== Reception ==
The 11-day closed beta for MapleStory Adventures proved popular, quickly reaching its 30,000 player cap. The title became the fastest growing Korean social game by surpassing 3,000,000 monthly active users just seven weeks into its open beta.
