= Terror Man =

2016–2020 South Korean webtoon

- Manhwa cover of Terror Man volume 1

^테러_맨
- Genre: Action, adventure, Science fiction
- Author: Han Dong-Woo
- Illustrator: Ko Jin-Ho
- Publisher: Naver Corporation
- English publisher: NA: Ablaze Publishing
- Webtoon service: Naver Webtoon (Korean)
- Original run: January 14, 2016 – May 22, 2020
- Volumes: 5

Terror Man
- Country of origin: South Korea
- Original language: Korean

Production
- Production companies: Studio BAZOOKA; DR Movie

Original release
- Network: TVING

Terror Man (Korean: 테러맨) is a South Korean manhwa released as a webtoon written by Han Dong-Woo and illustrated by Ko Jin-Ho. It was serialized via Naver Corporation's webtoon platform Naver Webtoon from January 2016 to May 2020, with the individual chapters collected and published into 5 volumes in the first season. An aeni series adaptation by Studio BAZOOKA and DR Movie has been announced, and it aired on the OTT streaming platform TVING.

== Media ==
=== Manhwa ===
In December 2022, Ablaze Publishing announced that they licensed the manhwa in English.
