= Trevor Wall =

Canadian animator and director

- Occupations: Animator, storyboard artist, and television & film director
- Years active: 1997–present

Trevor Wall is a Canadian animator, storyboard artist, and television & film director. He is best known for directing Puppy Dog Pals, Norm of the North, Sabrina: Secrets of a Teenage Witch, and Zevo-3.

== Early life and education ==
He started his career as a storyboard artist, and then in the late 1990s he was hired by Warner Bros. Animation.

== Career ==
In 2006, Wall was a storyboard director on the farewell season of Jakers! The Adventures of Piggley Winks.

In 2010, Wall directed a few episodes of animated television series Hero: 108 and Zevo-3.

In 2013-14, Wall directed another animated television series titled Sabrina: Secrets of a Teenage Witch, with Ashley Tisdale voicing the lead character.

In 2016, Wall made his feature film directing debut with the animated adventure Norm of the North, with the voices of Rob Schneider and Heather Graham. Lionsgate released the film on January 15, 2016.

== Filmography ==
=== As director ===
- Hero: 108 (2010, TV series)
- Zevo-3 (2010, TV series)
- Sabrina: Secrets of a Teenage Witch (2013–14, TV series)
- Norm of the North (2016, film)
- Puppy Dog Pals (2017–2023, TV series)

=== As a storyboard artist ===
- Detention (1999, TV series; "Shareena Takes the Cake", "The Contest", "Breaking Out", "Comedy of Terrors", "Capitol Punishment", "The Blame Game", "A Friend In Greed", & "Rule The School")
- Baby Blues (2000, TV series; "World's Greatest Dad" & "Teddy-Cam")
- Time Squad (2001, TV series; "Keepin' It Real with Sitting Bull", "A Thrilla at Attila's", "Hate and Let Hate", "Child's Play", & "Ex Marks the Spot")
- Grim & Evil (2001, TV series; "Everyone Loves Uncle Bob")
- My Life as a Teenage Robot (2002, TV series; "Grid Iron Glory")
- Larryboy: The Cartoon Adventures (2002, TV series; "Leggo My Ego!" & "The Yodelnapper!")
- Evil Con Carne (2003, TV series; "Everyone Loves Uncle Bob" & "Go Spork")
- The Grim Adventures of Billy & Mandy (2003, TV series; "The Grim Show")
- Clifford's Puppy Days (2003, TV series; "Flo-Motion", "Best Nest", & "Fall Feast")
- Pet Alien (2005, TV series; "The Guest Who Wouldn't Leave... Ever", "The Thing with the Ugly Face")
- Growing Up Creepie (2006, TV series; "Bug It On", "Roaché Motel", "Field of Screams", "Mom Under Glass" "Goth To Have Better Friends", "Headless Roach Man", "Bad Karma Chameleon", "Home is Where the Haunt Is", "Are You Afraid of the Moths?", "Revenge of the Water Bug", "Nightmare on Locust Lane", "Night of A Thousand Legs", & "Creepie Cousin")
