= Bright Shadow =

- Movie Poster
- Persian: سايه روشن
- Directed by: Hossein Shahabi
- Written by: Hossein Shahabi
- Produced by: Hossein Shahabi
- Starring: Samin gholami; Nader Parchami; Mahmood Shirazi; Sara Kermani; Azar Roohi
- Cinematography: Hamid Angaji
- Edited by: Hossein Shahabi
- Music by: Hossein Shahabi
- Production company: Baran film house
- Distributed by: Baran Film House
- Release date: 1997
- Running time: 90 min
- Country: Iran
- Language: Persian

Bright Shadow (Persian: سايه روشن) is a 1997 Iranan drama film written and directed by Hossein Shahabi (Persian: حسین شهابی)

== Starring ==
- Samin Gholami
- Nader Parchami
- Mahmood Shirazi
- Karim Nobakht
- Sara Kermani
- Azar Roohi
- Nader Karimian Sedaghat

== Crew ==
- cinematography: Hamid Angaji
- Sound Recorder: Sasan Salimi
- Production manager: Nima Poutrhajar
- Editor: Shahin Karimi
- Music: Hossein Shahabi
- Production: Baran film house 1997
