= DR Movie =

South Korean animation studio

DR Movie Co., Ltd. (주)식회사 디알무비
- Industry: Animation studio and production enterprise
- Founded: November 1990
- Headquarters: Main: Seoul, South Korea; Others: Los Angeles, United States; Tokyo, Japan; Qingdao, China
- Area served: South Korea, United States, Japan, China
- Key people: Jeong Jeong-Gyun (CEO); Jung Young-Mok (CFO)
- Number of employees: 350 (approximately) (2007)
- Subsidiaries: Busan DR; DR Tokyo (Note: Japanese branch.)
- Website: www.drmovie.co.kr

DR Movie Co., Ltd. (주식회사 디알무비) is a South Korean animation studio that was established in Seoul in 1990 and frequently works with Japanese companies on anime titles. Since 1991, the studio has been in an exclusive partnership with the Japanese animation studio Madhouse, and in 2001, Madhouse became a partial owner/investor. In 2006, Madhouse's parent company at the time, Index Holdings, invested 600 million yen. DR Movie has been responsible for the animation production end of several Madhouse anime, starting with Tenjho Tenge in 2004 and continuing notably with Claymore in 2007. DR Movie has also been looking to make partnerships with Chinese animation companies for future productions, and as of March 2007 entered into a joint venture studio in Qingdao, China.

Besides Madhouse, DR Movie also has worked extensively with Nickelodeon, Sunrise, Warner Bros Animation, Gonzo, and Studio Ghibli. DR Movie is the only Korean contract studio with which Ghibli has worked.

Additionally, DR Movie maintains a production facility in Busan, known as Busan DR.

== Works ==
=== Original productions ===
- Elsword: El Lady
- Flowering Heart (2016–2017; co-production with Bridge and Busan DR)
- Guardian Fairy Michel
- Metal Fighter T-Boys
- Robotech: The Shadow Chronicles
- Paboo Infinity Force
- The Rising of the Shield Hero (Season 2; co-produced with Kinema Citrus)
- Terror Man

=== As an outsource studio for American production ===
- Avatar: The Last Airbender - (19 episodes)
- Avengers Assemble
- The Batman
- Batman: Mystery of the Batwoman
- Batman and Harley Quinn
- Batman Unlimited: Animal Instincts
- Batman vs. Two-Face
- Castlevania: Nocturne
- Godzilla: The Series (Seasons 1 and 2)
- Guardians of the Galaxy
- Hellboy: Sword of Storms
- Hellboy: Blood and Iron
- High Guardian Spice
- Hulk and the Agents of S.M.A.S.H.
- Hulk Vs
- Justice League
- Justice League Action
- Justice League Dark
- Loonatics Unleashed (Main Title Production)
- Masters of the Universe: Revelation
- Men in Black: The Series
- Onyx Equinox
- The Simpsons (Season 34 episode "Treehouse of Horror XXXIII" "Death Tome" segment)
- Todd McFarlane's Spawn
- Suicide Squad: Hell to Pay
- Teen Titans ("Switched")
- X-Men: Evolution
- Young Justice (Season 3)
