= MapleStory =

2003 video game

- Developers: Wizet (2003–2005); Nexon (2005–present)
- Publishers: Nexon (South Korea, Japan, North America, Europe, Thailand); Shengqu Games (China); AsiaSoft (Singapore, Malaysia, Vietnam); Gamania (Taiwan, Hong Kong); Level Up! Games (Brazil)
- Composers: CODA SOUND (CODASOUND, LedZeper); Moonsoo Park (LoudBell Studio); Studio EIM; M2U; Creed Sound; S.I.D-Sound; SQUARE MUSIQ; ASTERIA (NECORD); ESTIMATE (ESTi); Initium SoundLab
- Platforms: Microsoft Windows, macOS
- Release: KOR: April 29, 2003; JPN: December 3, 2003; CHN: July 23, 2004; NA: May 11, 2005; TWN: June 1, 2005; SEA: June 23, 2005; EU: April 12, 2007; THA: August 16, 2005
- Genre: Massively multiplayer online role-playing game
- Mode: Multiplayer

MapleStory (Korean: 메이플스토리 meipeulseutoli) is a free-to-play, 2D, side-scrolling massively multiplayer online role-playing game, developed by South Korean company Wizet and published by Nexon. Several versions of the game are available for specific countries or regions, published by various companies (such as Nexon).

Players traverse various worlds, including Maple World, the Arcane River between worlds, and the extraterrestrial world of Grandis, defeating monsters and developing their characters' skills and abilities as is typical in role-playing video games. Players can interact with others in many ways, including chatting and trading. Groups of players can band together in parties to hunt monsters and share rewards, and can also form guilds to interact more easily with each other. Players additionally have the option to visit the in-game "Cash Shop" to purchase a variety of character appearances or gameplay enhancements with real money or in-game currency obtained through various means.

In July 2010, the Korean version of the game was revised in a patch named the "Big Bang". Other versions followed suit and have since received the Big Bang update. Later in the year, the Korean version received the Chaos update which introduced player versus player (PvP) and professions to the game. Its sequel, MapleStory 2, was released in July 2015 and features updated 3D graphics and a similar storyline. As of 2020, MapleStory has reached over 180 million registered users worldwide and grossed over $3 billion in lifetime revenue.

== Plot ==
The plot of MapleStory takes place across several different worlds, such as Maple World, Arcane River, and Grandis. Created by these people with powers called the Overseers, they assigned each world with three guardians to look over both worlds: the Transcendent of Time, the Transcendent of Life and the Transcendent of Light. The first major arc revolves around the antagonist of Maple World, the Black Mage. The Black Mage was once the Transcendent of Light and was called the White Mage until an experiment went wrong and his pure light core was corrupted. The six heroes managed to seal the Black Mage for the next few centuries at the cost of being sealed away themselves. In the present day, the Black Mage's forces called the Black Wings, began resurfacing and attempted to revive him. Fearing his resurrection, Empress Cygnus created the Cygnus Knights in order to stop the Black Wings and the Black Mage's Commanders. As the seal on the Black Mage began weakening, the heroes of legend began returning as well. After the Black Mage broke free of his seal, Cygnus created the Maple Alliance, which banded together the free-spirited Explorers, the Cygnus Knights, the Resistance against the Black Wings, the six Heroes of Maple, and several brave adventurers from other worlds.

The Alliance continued fighting the Black Wings and won a decisive victory in the battle of Black Heaven, during which time, a hero of the Alliance awakened as the Adversary, a champion imbued with divine energy. Soon after, the Black Mage created a dimension called the Arcane River in an attempt to destroy the world and recreate it in his image. The Adversary journeyed through the Arcane River and battled the last of the Black Mage's Commanders before the Alliance launched a final offensive to stop the Black Mage from ending their world. The Adversary successfully killed the Black Mage and saved Maple World from annihilation.

With the Black Mage's death, the second major arc began in the realm of Grandis, which had slowly fused with Maple World due to the Black Mage's machinations. The antagonist of Grandis, Gerand Darmoor, believed that his race, the High Flora, was superior to all others, and so he sought to remake all life in his image. In order to stop him, several factions of Grandis had joined the Maple Alliance. After the Black Mage's death, the Alliance sent its forces to battle Darmoor and his Apostles.

== Gameplay ==
MapleStory is a 2D scrolling platform game. The controls for the game are executed using the keyboard and mouse. The keyboard is used for many game functions, and much of it can be rearranged to suit users' needs. The mouse is mainly used to trigger non-player characters and manipulate items. Gameplay centers on venturing into dungeons and combating monsters and instanced bosses in real time. The players combat monsters and complete quests, in the process acquiring in-game currency called "Mesos", experience points, and various items. Players are able to acquire in-game professions, allowing them to craft equipment, accessories or potions.

Players have a variety of options when interacting with others online: they can form parties where loot and experience are distributed from a monster; in-game marriages where the game will recognize the two players as a heterosexual couple; guilds which is indicated with a guild's name listed under their character name; or families, an architecture gathering of juniors and seniors. Players are able to raise or lower the in-game popularity stat entitled Fame of other players and compete with other players in minigames, such as Gomoku or Concentration. They may engage in trading activities for "Mesos" or other in-game items.

=== Characters ===
MapleStory characters exist in worlds or servers. Players are able to create multiple characters in each world, though the characters in different worlds can not interact with each other. Each world is similar in content with each other. The worlds are divided into channels, among which characters are allowed to freely switch. The ability to transfer entire characters between worlds was added in December 2007 to Global MapleStory, with restrictions placed on items. In May 2012, this option was removed as it caused a negative impact on character gameplay.

When creating a new character, there are ten branches of classes currently available to choose from with two classes that have no specific branches currently: Explorers (denizens of Maple Island who depart for Victoria Island), Cygnus Knights (servants of Maple World's Cygnus who protect her and their home world), Heroes (the original heroes who fought and sealed the antagonistic Black Mage), Resistance (denizens of the high-tech city of Edelstein who fight against the militaristic Black Wings cult), Sengoku (warriors of Maple World's version of Japan who aim to fight against a fictionalized Oda Nobunaga), Nova (a dragon-like race of people who are denizens of Grandis), Flora (elf-like denizens of Grandis), Anima (animal-like denizens of Grandis), Jianghu (denizens of a forest-like continent in Maple World) and Shine (extraterrestrial denizens originated from MapleStory M). Zero, Kinesis, and Lethe are classes that currently have no specific branches. Some classes are currently not available in other regions while others are only available at certain times of year.

Explorer characters start on Maple Island and begin as a Beginner class. The Beginner is able to advance into one of the five classes: Warrior, Bowmen, Magician, Thief, and Pirate. After choosing their class, further class progression is only allowed within the scope of the first class advancement with advancements at level 30, 60, 100, 200, and 260. Three separate classes, under the Explorer branch, are created differently from normal Explorers: Dual Blade (Thief), Pathfinder (Bowman), and Cannoneer (Pirate).

Cygnus Knight characters begin as the Noblesse class and begin their journey in Ereve. At level 10, they are allowed to class advance into five Cygnus Knight classes.

Six Hero classes are available: Aran, Evan, Mercedes, Phantom, Luminous and Shade. The Hero classes are characters with background stories related to the antagonist of the game, the Black Mage. Aran has the Combo System, a unique feature to the class, allowing them to generate combo counts by hitting monsters, giving them buffs and allowing them to cast combo-consuming skills. Evan is similar to Magicians, but uses a dragon, which fights alongside them. Mercedes is an elven archer who uses dual bowguns. Phantom is a Thief character with the ability to mimic skills from Explorer characters. Luminous is a magician of light who can also use dark magic which they absorbed from the Black Mage. Shade is the sixth and forgotten hero, whose existence was erased during the sealing of the Black Mage. They use spirits to aid them in battle.

Resistance characters begin in Edelstein, a town taken over by the Black Mage's followers, the Black Wings. The characters created under the Resistance branch begin as Citizens and have four available job advancements: Battle Mage, Wild Hunter, Blaster and Mechanic. A Battle Mage uses a staff for physical attacks, a Wild Hunter rides a jaguar while wielding a crossbow, a Blaster uses an arm cannon and a Mechanic uses a robotic suit to fight. Demon, a separate class, under the resistance branch, is created differently from the normal Resistance. A Demon character can become a Demon Slayer, who uses one-handed blunt weapons and axes, or the Demon Avenger, who uses a specialised weapon called the Desperado. Xenon, another separate resistance character, is a human-turned-cyborg who escaped from the Black Wings' laboratories who uses Whip Blades in combat.

There are three main continents common to all versions in the MapleStory world: Maple Island, Victoria Island, and Ossyria. Maple Island is where adventurers start off their characters. Victoria Island contains eight cities, and is where most classes begin. Ossyria features seven distinct regions with varying environments: El Nath Mountains, Ludus Lake, Aqua Road, Minar Forest, Mu Lung Garden, Nihal Desert, and Temple of Time. Ereve and Rien are separated from another land which is the beginning of another job of the game.

The Cash Shop is an in-game shop where players use real-life currency to purchase unique virtual goods such as avatars, digital pets and other in-game items. Most Cash Shop items expire after a period of time. The Cash Shop also offers a shop permit, allowing players to set up a store in the in-game market location called the Free Market, exclusively for the classic game mode.

== Music ==
The current main composer for MapleStory is NECORD (ASTERIA). In 2016, Nexon established its own music production team, ASTERIA, and sound team, NECORD, and started producing music and releasing albums on its own. In 2017, they recorded music with an orchestra in Budapest, Hungary.

The game's music received positive reviews, and as the game has been on the service for a long time, it has stimulated memories for those who have stopped playing. Some music such as Lith Harbor village music, Eos Tower/Helios Tower of Ludibrium music, Blockbuster: Black Heaven music, Chu Chu Island music, Lachelein the Dreaming City music has been played in South Korean broadcast programs. The "Aquarium" music in the Aquarium which is a village of Aqua Road has been included in some South Korean music textbooks.

The music from 2006 to 2015 was composed by Studio EIM, and since 2014, official sound sources began to be released starting with FriendStory and Blockbuster: Black Heaven. At this time, M2U, who was outsourced from Studio EIM, composed Ariant Coliseum music and Ereve music.

In 2010, Kim Eun-bi, who was in the top 6 of Superstar K 2, became a Maple Girl, a promotional model for MapleStory, and unlike other Maple Girls, she released a song called I'm My Fan. In 2015, incumbent professional singer Taru sang a song, and from 2017, Second Moon began to play songs in offline events related to MapleStory, because they were in charge of music for the hologram musical Comic MapleStory in 2016. From 2018, Ha Hyun-woo of Guckkasten and the Guckkasten band themselves began to sing songs related to that game. In 2021, Bewhy also sang a song.

S.I.D-Sound composed some music such as MapleStory 8th anniversary event in 2011, the RED theme song in 2013, and the OST for FriendStory in 2014.

In 2015, SQUARE MUSIQ composed some songs such as Violeta Over Flowers which is a promotion song and vocal of "Promise of Heaven", which is a song of Blockbuster: Black Heaven.

In 2020, ESTIMATE and ESTi composed some music such as some Yum Yum Island music, theme of Adele's music, some Ristonia music, some Grand Athenaeum Episode VI: Sharenian Knights music and some Hotel Arcus music.

== Development ==
MapleStory was originally developed and released in South Korea and was localized to ten different regions as of 2003. As other publishers license the game for their region, proxy blocks are put in place (excluding the Korean version, it requires a KSSN), forcing players to play their localized version. In 2011, LevelUp! Games did not renew the contract for localization in Brazil.

An update entitled Big Bang was released in Korean MapleStory in July 2010 with other regional servers following suit soon after. Big Bang changed the game's core coding, and changed many aspects of the game. An update entitled Chaos features the introduction of professions, and PvP.

An update for Master's North American server was released on March 11, 2015, entitled Black Heaven. Players that registered prior to the update and before March 9 received a free Ignition Pack if they logged in before March 14 and after the update went live.

Nexon released the MapleStory Reboot update for its North American server in December 2015, which allows access to the Reboot world. This world has disabled trading, increased Meso drop rates, and weapon/equipment drops that are specific to the player's class. Reboot has the same monsters as other worlds, but with increased stats and experience points awarded.

Another update to the game, the 5th Job Advancement, was released in December 2016. When players reach Level 200 in the game, they would need to complete their job advancement quests before they are able to fully access their 5th Job skills. Different from the first four Job skills, the 5th Job skills come in three types of skills. The first one called the Shared Skills are skills that all characters share and have that they are able to use. The second one is called the Class-Specific, which are skills that only specific classes can use and the third one called the Job Skills which are skills that only that specific Job can use.

In July 2022, Nexon released the Destiny: Remastered update for its North American server. This update revamped all the Explorer classes (excluding the newest Explorer class, Pathfinder) by updating their skills and adding new storyline content for them while streamlining their original storylines. A new boss, Kalos, was also added to the game.

Nexon released an update named 6th Job Advancement in October and November 2023, featuring new skills for all classes. On April 16, 2025, Nexon America announced the development of a Global MapleStory Classic World during their 20th anniversary event. According to Miyoung Oh, one of the original game's early lead developers, MapleStory Classic World will be a "faithful recreation of the early MapleStory experience" while also adding in "some quality of life additions" from the modern GMS client. Nexon America's Chief Product Officer Hanbyeol Oh did not give a release date for Classic World, but stated that more details would be announced in the latter half of 2025.

In 2024, Nexon was fined ₩11.6 billion (US$8.9 million) for a violation of South Korea's Consumer Protection in Electronic Commerce Act, allegedly for changing the appearance rate of certain items in MapleStory without notifying players. At the time, this was the largest penalty issued for a violation of the act and the company's second violation of the act, following a 2018 fine connected to its game Sudden Attack.

== Reception ==
In Global MapleStory (GMS), more than a million players bought items in the Cash Shop, by 2010. By 2006, MapleStory had a combined total of 39 million user accounts worldwide. MapleStory Global had over 8 million users by 2011. As of 2014, it was among the top ten MMOs by worldwide revenue. As of 2020, the game has reached over 180 million registered users worldwide.

=== Sales ===
Up until 2011, the game grossed $1.8 billion. Between 2013 and 2017, the game grossed $1.181 billion, including $326 million in 2013, $240 million in 2014, $253 million in 2015, $83 million in 2016, and $279 million in 2017. As of 2020, the game has grossed over $3 billion worldwide in lifetime revenue.

== Related games ==
=== MapleStory DS ===
MapleStory DS is a game based on MapleStory and is a single-player game. The game was released for the Nintendo DS on April 15, 2010, in Korea.

=== MapleStory: Thief Edition and MapleStory: Cygnus Knights Edition ===
MapleStory: Thief Edition and MapleStory: Cygnus Knights Edition were single-player versions of MapleStory released for iOS in 2011. Each of these mobile games limited players to one or two jobs. In Thief Edition, players could only play as the Thief, and in Cygnus Knights Edition, players could only play as the Blaze Wizard and Dawn Warrior.

=== MapleStory - The Girl's Fate ===
MapleStory - The Girl's Fate is a spinoff for the Nintendo 3DS and is a single-player game, featuring a new character named Mugi. The game was released on April 25, 2013 in Korea and Japan. It's known as Maplestory: Girl of Destiny internationally, following the fan-made English translation.

=== MapleStory M ===
MapleStory M is a mobile game released for iOS and Android, in South Korea on October 13, 2016 and then overseas on May 28, 2018.

=== MapleStory 2 ===
The sequel, MapleStory 2, was released in Korea on July 7, 2015. Unlike its predecessor, MapleStory 2 took place on a 3D voxel-based plane at an often isometric angle.

=== MapleStory R: Evolution ===
MapleStory R: Evolution is an idle-game mobile RPG game. It was officially released in Southeast Asia on July 28, 2023, and is a vertical screen RPG. Its launch was promoted with live events held in Malaysia and Vietnam.

=== MapleStory Universe / MapleStory N ===
MapleStory Universe is a blockchain-based extension of the MapleStory intellectual property, developed by NEXPACE, an Abu Dhabi-based blockchain subsidiary of Nexon established in 2023. The project was originally announced at the Game Developers Conference in March 2023 as a project built on the Polygon network, before migrating to a custom Avalanche Layer 1 blockchain in 2024.

The ecosystem's first game, MapleStory N, is a PC massively multiplayer online role-playing game that retains the 2D side-scrolling gameplay of the original MapleStory while introducing fixed-supply, blockchain-based in-game items that can be converted to non-fungible tokens. The game launched on 15 May 2025, alongside the platform's native cryptocurrency token, NXPC, which was listed on multiple major exchanges including Binance, Bybit, Upbit and Bithumb.

NXPC is used for in-game functions including item crafting, NFT creation and player rewards, and that the platform applies issuance and supply limits intended to mirror real-world economic principles. NESO, the in-game currency, is earned through gameplay. MapleStory N is not available in South Korea due to domestic regulations restricting play-to-earn games.

== Other media ==
The Japanese anime entitled MapleStory (メイプルストーリー, Meipuru Sutōrī) was adapted of the game and produced by Madhouse. It aired on TV Tokyo between October 7, 2007, and March 30, 2008, spanning 25 episodes. The plot revolves around a warrior as he journeys to revive the world tree.

Nexon America released a MapleStory trading card game on November 6, 2007. Nexon Korea and Nexon Japan have since released similar trading card games, while Nexon America has since discontinued this service.

Nexon released a public beta of a MapleStory Adventures on July 27, 2011 as an adaptation for Facebook gaming format. The game consisted of mainly single-player play, but incorporated the main goals and themes of the full MapleStory game, which included creating an avatar, fighting monsters and completing quests. This version was discontinued on July 31, 2013.
