= Lolee Aries =

American television producer

Lolee Aries (April 18, 1957 – July 10, 2018) was a television producer specializing in animated series. Aries was an executive producer of Rugrats, Hey Arnold!, King of the Hill, CatDog, Family Guy, Dora the Explorer, The Fairly OddParents, Invader Zim, Oswald, and ChalkZone, and among other shows like The Simpsons, The Angry Beavers, SpongeBob SquarePants, and The Oblongs. Aries also worked for Film Roman Inc. also as an animation executive producer.

Aries died of complications stemming from lymphoma on July 10, 2018 at age 61.
