= Gamania =

Taiwanese video game developer

Gamania Digital Entertainment Co., Ltd. 遊戲橘子數位科技股份有限公司
- Type: Digital Entertainment Agency
- Industry: Online game
- Founded: 12 June 1995
- Headquarters: Taipei, Taiwan
- Key people: CEO: Albert Liu
- Products: Lineage, Maple Story...etc
- Revenue: NT$2,882.1 Million (2008)
- Number of employees: 1,200 (2009)
- Website: www.gamania.com

Gamania Digital Entertainment Co., Ltd. (Gamania) is a PC online game and digital entertainment corporation with its headquarters located in Taipei, Taiwan. It was the first Taiwanese online game brand to expand globally, with overseas branch offices publishing and developing digital entertainment contents in Seoul, Shanghai, Tokyo, Beijing, and Hong Kong. Gamania has over 10 million registered members around the world, built from Korean PC online games such as Lineage, MapleStory, Counter-Strike Online and KartRider. Its subsidiary development companies produce MMOGs such as Bright Shadow and Zodiac (Lucent Heart in Japan), which was awarded the Best New Game in 2008 by WebMoney Awards.

Gamania's core business is currently PC online gaming, but it aims to diversify into other fields of digital entertainment. Its creative center has been producing multiple award-winning animation projects. An animation series co-produced with Cartoon Network, Hero: 108, launched in North America and Europe in 2010.

As of 2012, Gamania has changed focus from overseas to the local market of South Korea, Taiwan and Japan and as such, closed down US/Europe Beanfun services.

== Subsidiaries ==
Sources:

- Gamania Digital Entertainment (H.K.) Co., Ltd.: Established in 2000–11.
- Gamania Digital Entertainment (Japan) Co., Ltd.: Established in 2001–08.
- Gamania Digital Entertainment (China) Co., Ltd. (北京游戏橘子数位科技有限公司): Established in 2002–07.
- Gamania Cheer Up Foundation (遊戲橘子關懷基金會): Established in 2008.
- Gamania Digital Entertainment (U.S.) Co., Ltd.
- Gamania Holdings Ltd.
- Gamania Korea Co., Ltd.
- ? (亞橘投資股份有限公司): 100% stake subsidiary of Gamania Digital Entertainment Co., Ltd.
- Gamania Digital Entertainment Labuan Holdings, Ltd.
- Foundation Digital Entertainment Co., Ltd. (放電人文數位科技股份有限公司): A print publishing and web media company. Established in 2007-02 as a media business subsidiary of Gamania Digital Entertainment Co., Ltd.
- TWO TIGERS CO., Ltd. (兩隻老虎股份有限公司): Established in 2010.
- Gameastor Digital Entertainment Co., Ltd. (東遊玩子數位科技股份有限公司): Taiwan Index Corporation (台灣易吉網股份有限公司) became a subsidiary of Gamania Digital Entertainment Co., Ltd. in 2004–03. Taiwan Index Corporation was renamed to Gameastor Digital Entertainment Co., Ltd. in 2010-09-03.
- GASH PLUS Company Limited (樂點卡數位科技股份有限公司): A virtual currency company. Established in 2011-05-03.
- ? (全球倍術股份有限公司):

=== Developer studios ===
- Alibangbang Digital Games Co., Ltd./Fantasy Fish Studio (飛魚數位遊戲股份有限公司): Acquired by Gamania Digital Entertainment Co., Ltd. in 2002. Web site defunct.
- Seedo Studio (果核數位股份有限公司): A Taiwan-based developer. Established in 2009.
- RedGate Games (紅門數位科技股份有限公司): A Taiwan-based developer. Established in 2009.
- PlayCoo Corporation (玩酷科技股份有限公司): A Taiwan-based developer. In 2008–07, it became a developer for Gamania.
- Firedog Studio Company Limited (火狗工房股份有限公司): A Hong Kong-based developer. Became a subsidiary of Gamania Digital Entertainment Co., Ltd. in 2010–08.
- Gamania RD center:
- Tornado Studio Co., Ltd.: Gama Games Co., Ltd. became a fully owned subsidiary in 2011. Gama Games Co., Ltd. was renamed to Tornado Studio Co., Ltd. in 2011–08.

=== Former subsidiaries ===
- Gamania Korea Digital Entertainment Co., Ltd.: Established in 2000–01, and closed in 2012–11.
- Extreme Digital Technology Co., Ltd.? (極刻數位科技股份有限公司): As of 2012 Q2, Gamania Digital Entertainment Co., Ltd. no longer has stock for the subsidiary.

== History of Gamania ==
1995

- Established as FullSoft on 1995-06-12, debut in-house title "Eclipse".

1999

- Renamed to Gamania Digital Entertainment Co., Ltd (遊戲橘子數位科技股份有限公司).
- "Convenience Store" broke the sales record of more than 1,200,000 copies over five areas in Asia (The sale number of the most famous game in Asia then was over 100,000 copies). It was the most successful console game in Asia in 1999.

2000

- Entered the Korean market and established Gamania (Korea).
- "Convenience Store 1" Korean edition was published and became very popular, selling 150,000 copies.
- Gamania's corporate logo was awarded the Gold Award for Creative Logo Design and Judges' Pick at the Taipei International Creative Design Exhibition.
- Expanded into the media industry to publish the digital leisure magazine "Mania" in Taiwan. It immediately became the top-selling magazine of its type with a circulation of 200,000 copies.
- Established the largest online game server center in Asia.
- Published the Korean edition of "Fast Food Store" in Korea. Over 50,000 copies were sold and the game was selected by the Pusan University in Korea as assigned case study.
- Acquired the Chinese edition license for the online game "Lineage". Just two weeks after its release in Taiwan, membership swelled to 200,000.
- Established Gamania (Hong Kong). "Convenience Store 2" simultaneously launched in Taiwan, Hong Kong and Korea.

2001

- Gamania's corporate logo won the gold award in the "Top 10 National Design Awards."
- Established Gamania (Japan) in Tokyo.

2002

- Gamania formally listed on the Taiwan Stock Exchange.
- Established Gamania (Beijing).
- Acquired AliBangBang Digital Games, bringing its self-developed game "Xian Mo Dao" into Gamania group.

2003

- Self-developed game "Cococan" launched in Taiwan bundled with the Single of game soundtrack. Within just two weeks membership passed the 250,000 mark.
- Integration of game portal Gamania.com completed, making it the most viewed portal website and standard-setter for Taiwan's online game industry.
- Gamania's corporate logo was awarded the gold medal at the National Creative Awards and was included in the "China CIS Yearbook."
- The membership of "Lineage" in Taiwan reached over 3.5 million, making it the online game with the largest player base in Taiwan.
- "Hero: 108" and "What a Hell!" granted the animation prototype award at the "2003 International Digital Content Prototype Awards."

2004

- Acquired Taiwan Index, bringing its online games "Seal Online", "N-Age" and "Crusade" into the Gamania group.
- Launched Gamania mobile phone payment system in Taiwan, allowing all users to purchase GASH points through their mobile phones. This made Gamania the first game company in Taiwan to offer an integrated virtual payment system.
- First musical online game "O2JAM" launched in Taiwan.
- The "Piggy to..." animation targeted at the Western audience and "Who's Next Door" both won the animation prototype award at the "2004 International Digital Content Prototype Awards."

2005

- Acquired license to "Maple Story", the first free casual online game in Taiwan, which successfully opened up the young online game players' market and set a new gaming trend.

2006

- Gamania's "COCOCAN Ver 3.0" was awarded "Best Casual Game" at the "2006 Game Star Award."
- Launched five self-developed online games at the Tokyo Game Show: "Super Rich", "Bright Shadow", "Xian Mo Dao", "Zodiac" and "AOW " and gained immediate popularity among players.

2007

- Established Media Subsidiary Company, "Foundation Digital Entertainment," to develop online game and entertainment media industry.
- Acquired license to "KartRider," which became the largest casual game in Taiwan with the membership up to 3.8 million.
- "Zodiac Online" was granted "International Digital Content Prototype Award" at the 2006 Digital Contents Awards organized by the Industrial Development Bureau of the Ministry of Economic.
- Launched the first self-developed online game "Bright Shadow" and achieved over 30,000 concurrent players online.
- The very first representative animation work of Gamania, "Hero:108," signed a contract deal with Cartoon Network UK.

2008

- Established "Gamania Cheer Up Foundation" to encourage 16- to 22-year-old teenagers - "Dare to Dream and Stay True to Be Oneself."
- Won 2008 Taiwan Superior Brand award from Taiwan External Trade Development Council.
- Established Gamania E-Sports team, Gama Bears, to officially join professional E-Sports.
- Gamania Japan officially reached profit point with revenue heights by self-developed online game Bright Shadow and Zodiac.

2009

- Established R&D subsidiary companies "PLAYCOO Corporation", "SEEDO Games" and "RedGate Games" to reach the goal of Gamania Group.
- Gamania was awarded "2009 Top Taiwan Golden Brand" hosted by Taiwan External Trade Development Council

== Marketing ==
The company's F.A.M.I.L.Y. slogan stands for Fun, Adventure, Mind-Inspiring, Innovation, Laurels, Youth.

== See also ==
- List of companies of Taiwan
