= NHN Japan Corporation =

Japanese technology company

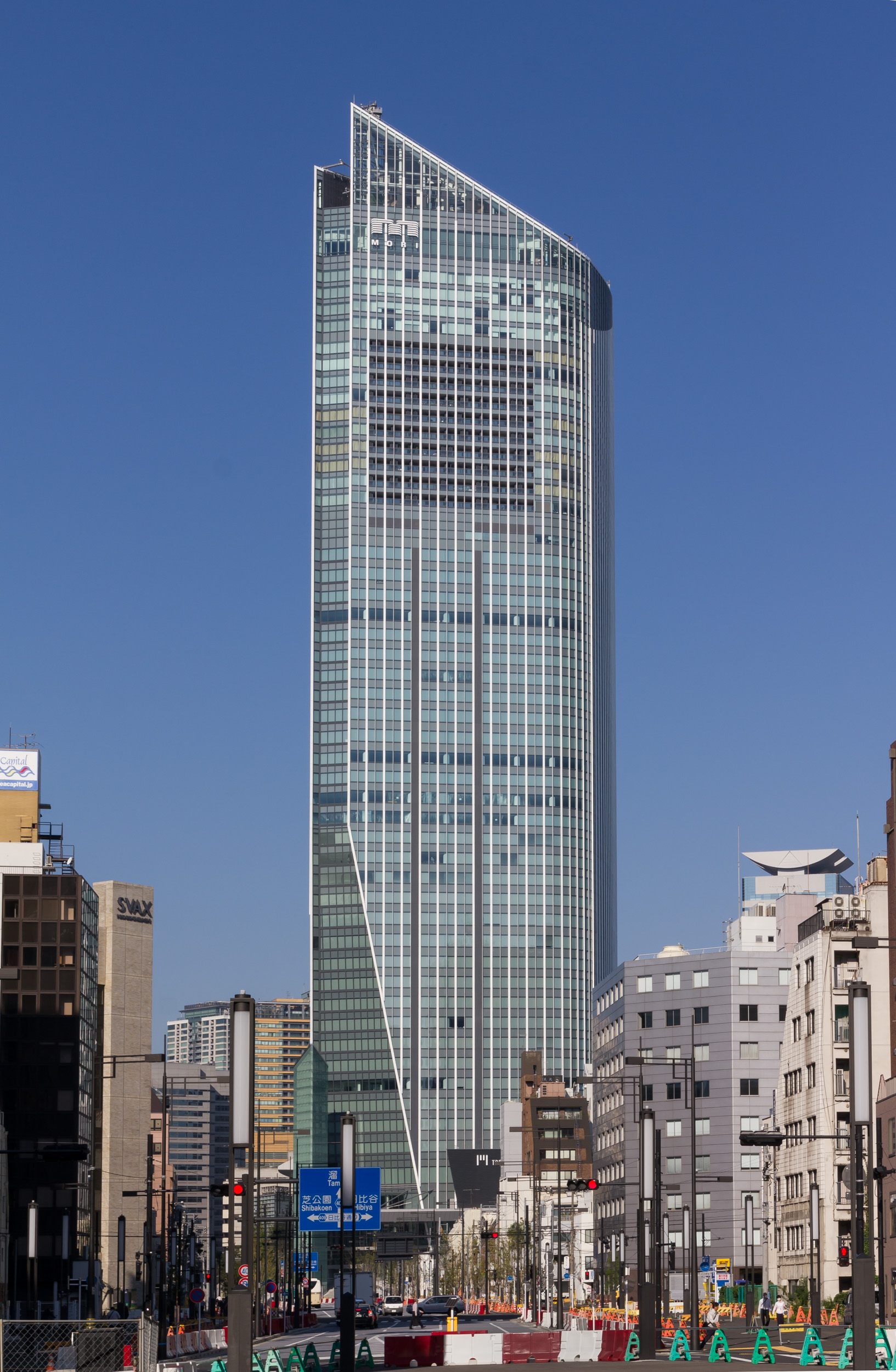
- Native name: NHN JAPAN株式会社
- Type: Public
- Founded: Tokyo, Japan (August 1, 2013)
- Area served: Worldwide
- Owner: NHN Entertainment Corporation
- Subsidiaries: NHN Comico; NHN PlayArt
- Website: Official Website

NHN Japan Corporation is the Japanese subsidiary of NHN Entertainment Corporation.

== Products ==
=== NHN Comico ===
NHN Comico operates Comico, a webtoon portal that is available in Japan, South Korea, Taiwan, and Thailand.

=== NHN PlayArt ===
NHN PlayArt is video game developer who specialize in smartphone games.
