= Going Seventeen (web series) =

South Korean web series

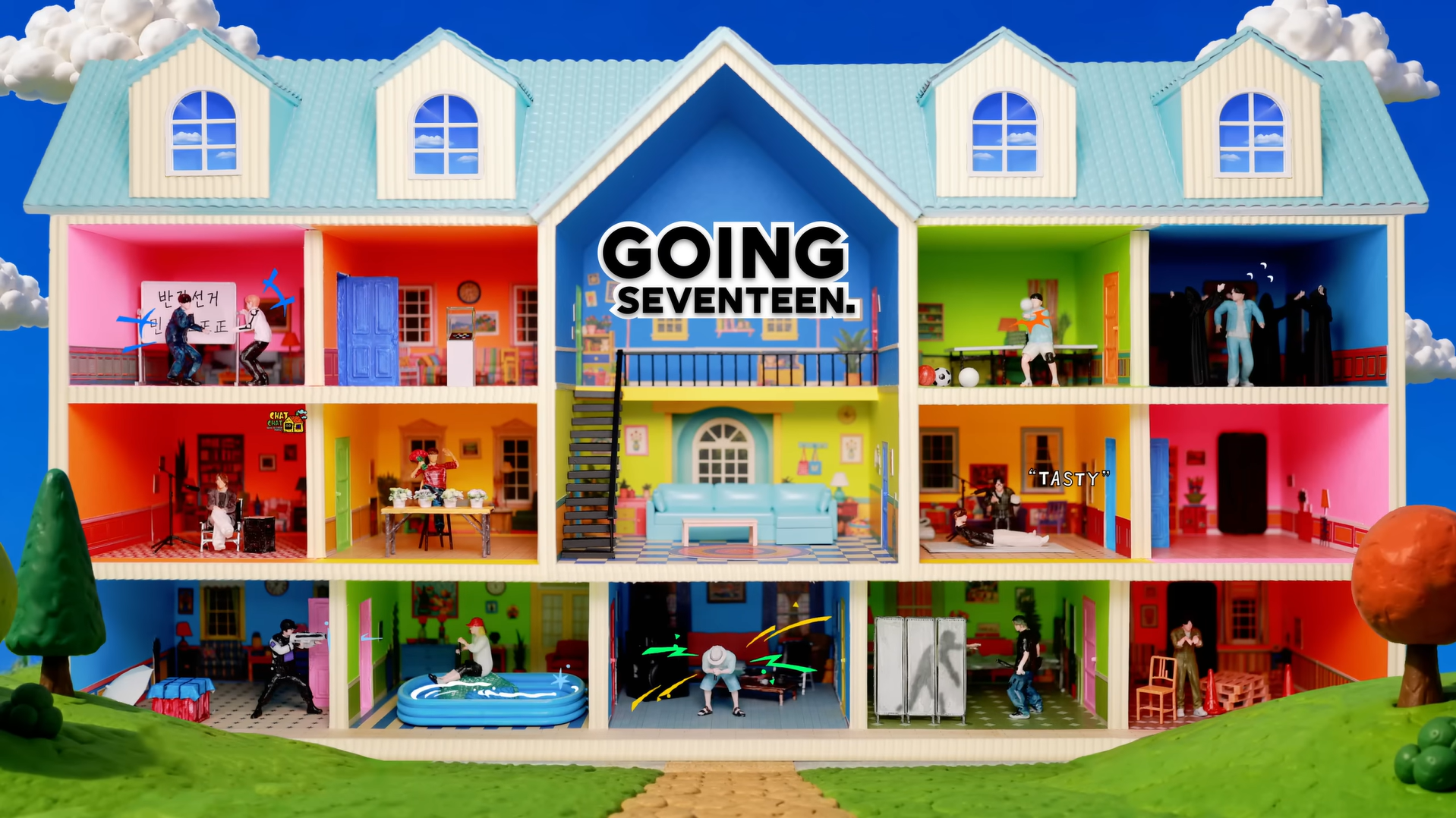
- The title card for Going Seventeen in 2026
- Hangul: 고잉 세븐틴
- RR: Going sebeuntin
- MR: Koing sebŭnt'in
- Genre: Variety show
- Starring: Seventeen
- Opening theme: "Going Seventeen Opening Song" by Seventeen
- Ending theme: "Going Seventeen Ending Song" by Seventeen
- Country of origin: South Korea
- Original language: Korean
- No. of seasons: 5
- No. of episodes: 291

Production
- Camera setup: Multi-camera
- Running time: around 30 minutes
- Production company: Pledis Entertainment

Original release
- Network: YouTube; Weverse; V Live (2017–2022); JTBC (2021)
- Release: June 12, 2017 – present

Going Seventeen (Korean: 고잉 세븐틴, also known as GoSe) is a South Korean variety web series starring boy band Seventeen. The series has been offered for free viewing on YouTube and V Live (then later, on Weverse) since its premiere on June 12, 2017. It features the band members participating in a variety of activities depending on an episode's main concept, ranging from games or completing challenges to skits, role playing, get-togethers and MTs.

The show started primarily with a video blog / behind-the-scenes format in its first seasons, featuring the band's various activities across their career with intermittent variety-type episodes. In 2019, it formally transitioned to the variety show format, and it aired weekly on Mondays at 22:10 KST since January 2020. It began airing on Wednesdays at 21:00 KST since the start of its fifth season in April 2021. Starting from October 2023, the band released a comeback special to celebrate and promote every new album, compilation album or extended play.

Throughout its broadcast history, the show garnered positive reviews for providing quality content that can be enjoyed by anyone in and outside the band's fandom, with cumulative views exceeding 270 million as of January 2022.

== Cast ==
=== Main ===
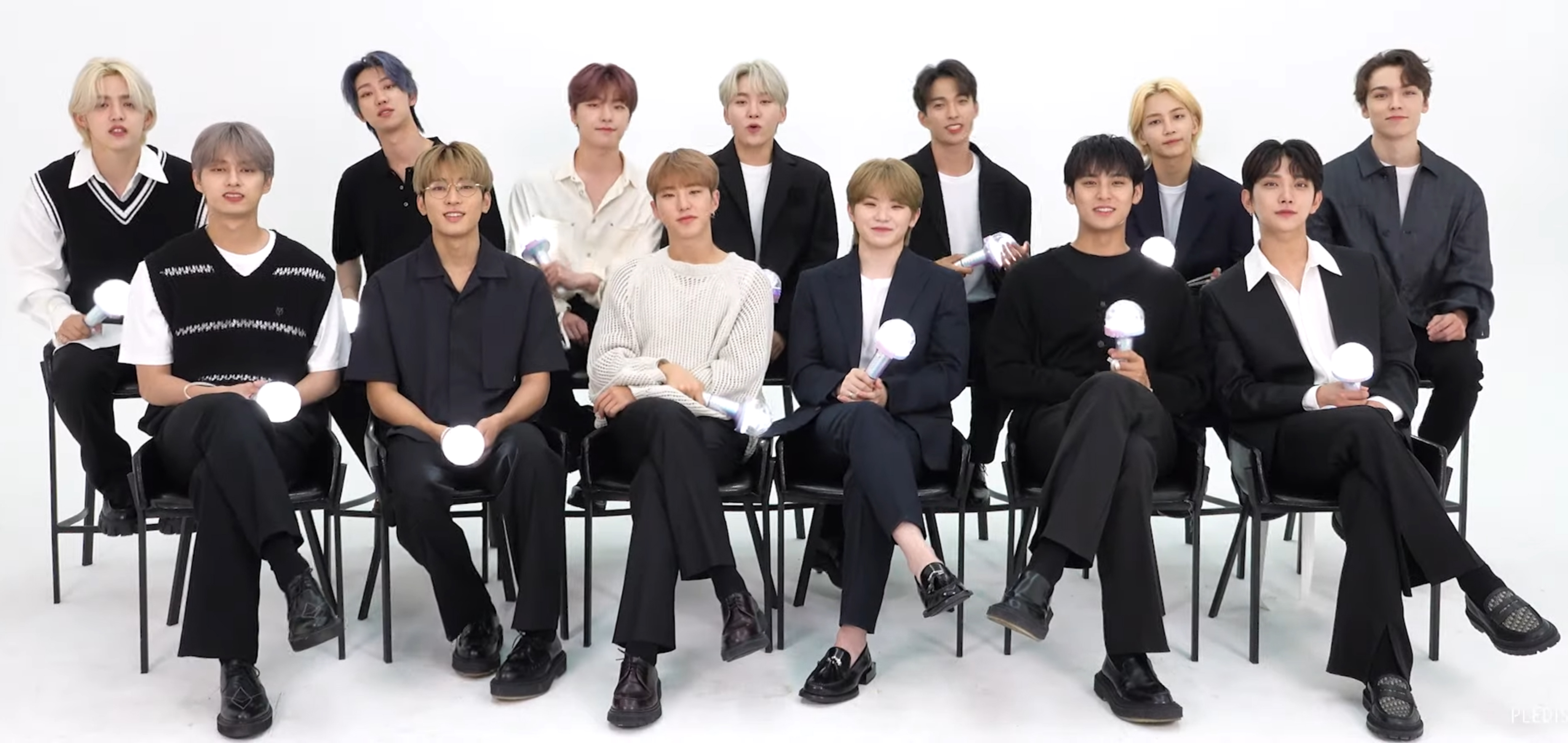
South Korean boy band Seventeen

Seventeen

- Choi Seung-cheol (S.Coups)
- Yoon Jeong-han (Jeonghan)
- Hong Joshua (Joshua)
- Wen Junhui (Jun)
- Kwon Soon-young (Hoshi)
- Jeon Won-woo (Wonwoo)
- Lee Ji-hoon (Woozi)
- Xu Minghao (The8)
- Kim Min-gyu (Mingyu)
- Lee Seok-min (Dokyeom/DK)
- Boo Seung-kwan (Seungkwan)
- Hansol Vernon Chwe (Vernon)
- Lee Chan (Dino)

=== Special appearance ===
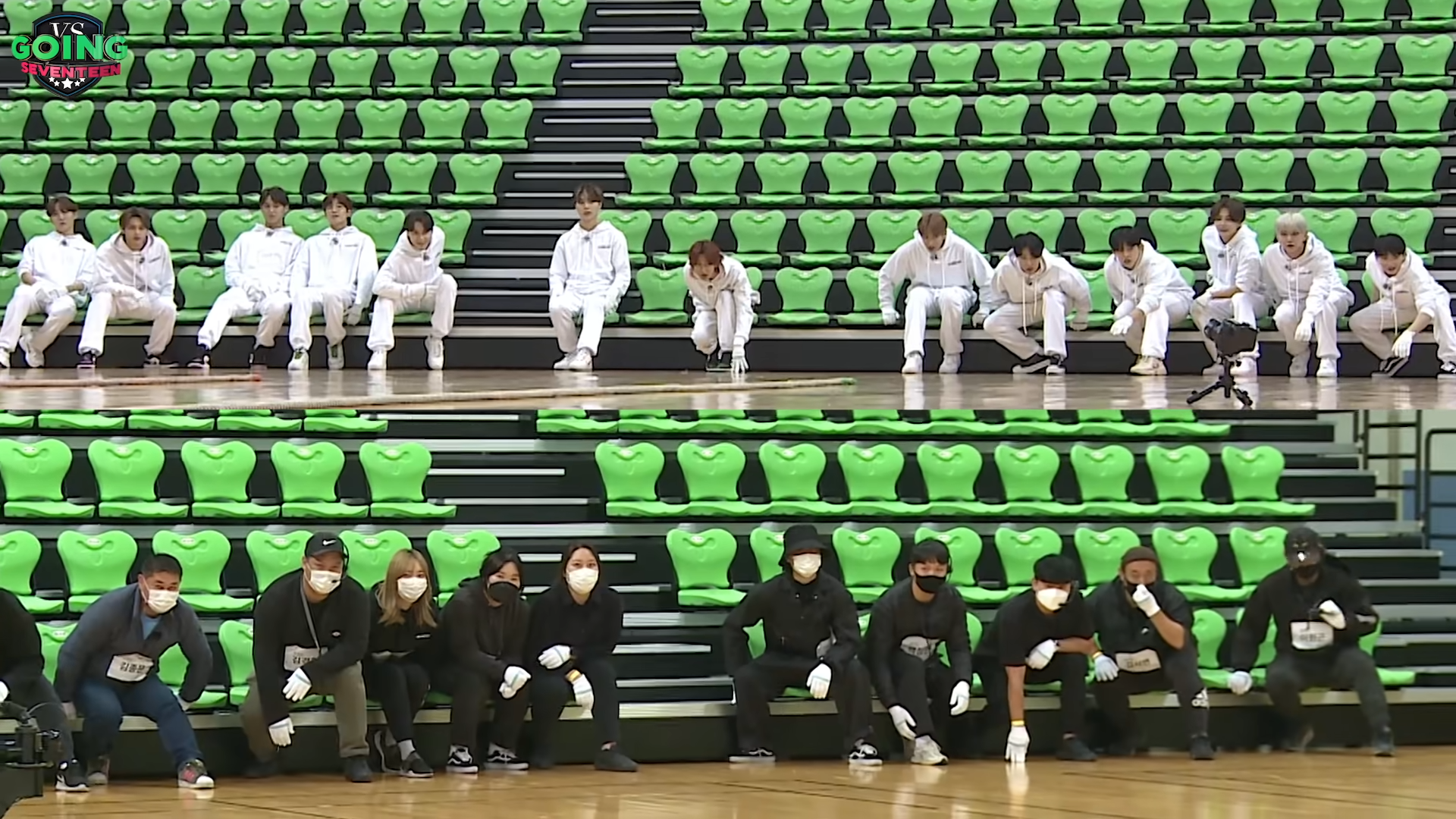
Seventeen (top, in white) and some members of the Going Seventeen production team (bottom, in black) in the 43rd episode of Going Seventeen 2020

- Going Seventeen production team

Headed by director Kim Hyun-seok and producer Lee Eun-song, members of the Going Seventeen production team made a special appearance in Episodes 42–43: "Going vs. Seventeen" of Going Seventeen 2020, the first ever instance of such participation in the show.

- Relatives of the members of Seventeen

A few relatives of some members of Seventeen made special appearances in the show. They include Hoshi's parents and Dino's grandmother in Episodes 36–37: "How to Eat Rice the Perfect Way" of Going Seventeen (2021–present).

- Pets of the members of Seventeen

Hoshi's pet dog Latte made a special appearance in Episode 118: "Going Production: Don't Laugh" and Episode 119: "Going Production" of Going Seventeen (2021–present).

- Park Mun-ki

A referee from the Korea Council of Sport for All (KOCOSA) who was a regular cast member in the 2005–2018 MBC reality show Infinite Challenge, in which he participated as the show's official referee. Park appeared in Episode 39: "Infinite Going" (Part 2) of Going Seventeen (2021–present).

- Lee Eun-jae (Jaejae)

Television producer and presenter who is the host of the SBS variety web series MMTG. Lee appeared and co-hosted in a special collaborative episode between Going Seventeen and MMTG.

== Series overview ==
Series overview
Season	Episodes		Originally released	
Season	Episodes		First released	Last released
1	29		June 12, 2017	December 25, 2017
2	24		February 5, 2018	December 24, 2018
3	28		March 11, 2019	January 6, 2020
4	47		January 27, 2020	January 18, 2021
5	163	35	April 14, 2021	December 15, 2021
5	163	29	February 9, 2022	September 28, 2022
5	163	34	March 1, 2023	November 23, 2023
5	163	25	May 15, 2024	December 11, 2024
5	163	26	June 25, 2025	December 17, 2025
5	163	14	July 8, 2026	—

Note: Special episodes are not counted towards the total.

== Episodes ==
=== Going Seventeen 2017 ===
All episodes in this season except for the final episode (Episode 29) are in video blog / behind-the-scenes format, featuring Seventeen's various activities across their career. Episode 29 is in a talk show format.

No. overall	No. in season	Title	MC	Teams	Original release date
—	0	"Prologue"	—	—	June 5, 2017
The behind-the-scenes of the music video of Seventeen's single "Don't Wanna Cry"
1	1	"In L.A."	—	—	June 12, 2017
Members of Seventeen documenting their free time in Los Angeles
2	2	"In L.A."	—	—	June 19, 2017
(cont'd from Ep. 1) Members of Seventeen documenting their free time in Los Angeles
3	3	"Show Champion"	—	—	June 26, 2017
The behind-the-scenes of Seventeen's appearance in Show Champion, where they performed "Don't Wanna Cry"
4	4	"Happy Birthday to Hoshi"	—	—	July 3, 2017
The behind-the-scenes of Seventeen's appearances in Show Champion and M Countdown and their celebration of Hoshi's birthday
5	5	"Concert Poster Shoot Behind"	—	—	July 10, 2017
The behind-the-scenes of a photoshoot of Seventeen's concert poster
6	6	"Fan Sign Meeting in Daegu & Daejeon"	—	—	July 17, 2017
The behind-the-scenes of a Seventeen's fan sign meeting with their fans in Daegu in Daejeon
7	7	"Concert VCR Shoot Behind"	—	—	July 24, 2017
8	8	"Diamond Edge Concert Practice Behind"	—	—	July 31, 2017
9	9	"Diamond Edge Concert" (Part 1)	—	—	August 7, 2017
10	10	"Diamond Edge Concert" (Part 2)	—	—	August 14, 2017
11	11	"1st World Tour Diamond Edge in Japan" (Part 1)	—	—	August 21, 2017
12	12	"1st World Tour Diamond Edge in Japan" (Part 2)	—	—	August 29, 2017
13	13	"4th Mini Album Al1 Jacket Behind"	—	—	September 4, 2017
14	14	"Behind of Behind"	—	—	September 11, 2017
(cont'd from Ep. 13)
15	15	"1st World Tour Diamond Edge in Thailand & Hong Kong"	—	—	September 18, 2017
16	16	"1st World Tour Diamond Edge in North America" (Part 1)	—	—	September 25, 2017
17	17	"1st World Tour Diamond Edge in North America" (Part 2)	—	—	October 2, 2017
18	18	"1st World Tour Diamond Edge in Chile & 'My I' M/V Behind"	—	—	October 9, 2017
19	19	"1st World Tour Diamond Edge in Jakarta & Singapore"	—	—	October 16, 2017
20	20	"1st World Tour Diamond Edge in Taipei"	—	—	October 23, 2017
21	21	"1st World Tour Diamond Edge in Kuala Lumpur"	—	—	October 30, 2017
22	22	"1st World Tour Diamond Edge in Manila"	—	—	November 6, 2017
23	23	"1st World Tour Diamond Edge Behind" (Part 1)	—	—	November 13, 2017
24	24	"1st World Tour Diamond Edge Behind" (Part 2)	—	—	November 20, 2017
25	25	"The Making of the Album Teen, Age"	—	—	November 27, 2017
26	26	"The Behind of Mnet Present Special & Showcase"	—	—	December 4, 2017
27	27	"Show Champion & 1st Fan Sign Meeting"	—	—	December 11, 2017
28	28	"Fan Meeting & Music Bank Behind"	—	—	December 25, 2017
29	29	"Special Going Seventeen"	Wonwoo · DK · Hoshi	—	December 25, 2017

=== Going Seventeen Spin-off (2018) ===
The episodes in this season are in video blog format unless noted otherwise.

No. overall	No. in season	Title	MC	Teams	Original release date
30	1	"Episode 1" (Note: This episode is in variety show format.) (Note: This episode is untitled.)	Mingyu	The Prize is Mine (Jeonghan, S.Coups, Jun & Seungkwan) · DK, Good Job! (DK, Joshua, Wonwoo & Woozi) · Rose Quartz is Your Serenity (The8, Hoshi, Vernon & Dino)	February 5, 2018
New Year Special: Members of Seventeen compete in teams of 4 to make the best rice cake soup. Each team has 30 seconds to choose their ingredients. Mingyu is the judge of the competition. Result Team "The Prize is Mine wins", Team "Rose Quartz is Your Serenity" comes second, and Team "DK, Good Job!" comes last.
31	2	"Time Letter"	—	—	February 19, 2018
Seventeen reads the letters sent to their future selves.
32	3	"Episode 3" (Note: Episodes 3 – 10 are untitled.)	—	—	March 5, 2018
The making of the Special Album Director's Cut & Thanks M/V Behind
33	4	"Episode 4"	—	—	March 19, 2018
Music show promotions for Thanks & Seventeen Director's Cut Special GV (Guest Visit) Behind
34	5	"Episode 5"	—	—	April 2, 2018
The making and promotions of Seventeen sub-unit BooSeokSoon's single Just Do It
35	6	"Episode 6"	—	—	April 17, 2018
2018 Japan Arena Tour 'SVT' (Part 1)
36	7	"Episode 7"	—	—	April 30, 2018
2018 Japan Arena Tour 'SVT' (Part 2)
37	8	"Episode 8"	Jun	—	May 14, 2018
Spring Special (Part 1): Seventeen members S.Coups, Jeonghan, Jun, Wonwoo, DK and Seungkwan learn how to make flower garlands.
38	9	"Episode 9"	Mingyu	—	May 28, 2018
Spring Special (Part 2): Seventeen members Joshua, Hoshi, Woozi, The8, Mingyu, Vernon and Dino learn how to draw croquis and caricatures.
39	10	"Episode 10"	—	—	June 11, 2018
Seventeen 3rd Anniversary Exhibition - 17's Cut
40	11	"Call Call Call to CARATs through the Behind-the Scenes of Seventeen's Japan Debut"	—	—	June 25, 2018
41	12	"Seventeen Preparing for the Ideal Cut Concerts"	—	—	July 9, 2018
42	13	"Seventeen and CARAT's Ideal Cut"	—	—	July 23, 2018
43	14	"Promotions for You Make My Day" (Part 1)	—	—	August 7, 2018
44	15	"Promotions for You Make My Day" (Part 2)	—	—	August 20, 2018
45	16	"Seventeen's Free Time" (Part 1)	—	Futsal court: Team S.Coups (S.Coups, Hoshi, Woozi & Seungkwan) · Team Jeonghan (Jeonghan, DK, Mingyu & Dino); Arcade: Joshua, Jun, Wonwoo, The8 & Vernon	September 3, 2018
46	17	"Seventeen's Free Time" (Part 2)	—	Futsal court: Team S.Coups (S.Coups, Hoshi, Woozi & Seungkwan) · Team Jeonghan (Jeonghan, DK, Mingyu & Dino); Arcade: Joshua, Jun, Wonwoo, The8 & Vernon	September 17, 2018
47	18	"2018 Ideal Cut Tour" (Part 1)	—	—	October 1, 2018
48	19	"2018 Ideal Cut Tour" (Part 2)	—	—	October 15, 2018
49	20	"2018 Ideal Cut Tour" (Part 3)	—	—	October 29, 2018
50	21	"TTT (MT SVT Reality)" (Part 1)	—	Team S.Coups (S.Coups, Wonwoo & Dino) · Team Jeonghan (Jeonghan, The8 & Mingyu) · Team Woozi (Jun, Hoshi, Woozi & Vernon) · Team Seungkwan (Joshua, DK & Seungkwan)	November 12, 2018
51	22	"TTT (MT SVT Reality)" (Part 2)	—	Team S.Coups (S.Coups, Wonwoo & Dino) · Team Jeonghan (Jeonghan, The8 & Mingyu) · Team Woozi (Jun, Hoshi, Woozi & Vernon) · Team Seungkwan (Joshua, DK & Seungkwan)	November 26, 2018
52	23	"TTT (MT SVT Reality)" (Part 3)	—	Team S.Coups (S.Coups, Wonwoo & Dino) · Team Jeonghan (Jeonghan, The8 & Mingyu) · Team Woozi (Jun, Hoshi, Woozi & Vernon) · Team Seungkwan (Joshua, DK & Seungkwan)	December 10, 2018
53	24	"Year-End Special"	—	—	December 24, 2018

=== Going Seventeen 2019 ===
This season marks Going Seventeen's change of format, transitioning from video blog (Episodes 1, 2, 5, 8, 9, 12 and 13) to variety show (Episodes 3, 4, 6, 7, 10, 11, 14 and onwards). It is also in this season when the show first used its opening and ending theme songs.

No. overall	No. in season	Title	MC	Teams	Original release date
54	1	"Episode 1" (Note: Episodes 1 – 3 are untitled.)	—	—	March 11, 2019
55	2	"Episode 2"	—	—	March 25, 2019
56	3	"Episode 3"	—	—	April 8, 2019
57	4	"Presenting the New Employees of Going Entertainment"	—	—	April 21, 2019
58	5	"Carat Land Behind"	—	—	April 21, 2019
59	6	"Making the Going Seventeen Opening Song"	—	—	May 20, 2019
60	7	"Making the Going Seventeen Opening Video"	—	—	June 3, 2019
61	8	"Japan Haru Concert" (Part 1) (Note: This episode marks Going Seventeen’s first use of its opening and ending theme songs.)	—	—	June 17, 2019
62	9	"Japan Haru Concert" (Part 2)	—	—	July 1, 2019
63	10	"Dang-Dang-Gam-Che" (Part 1) (Note: The episode's original (Korean) title 당.당.감.체 (RR: Dang.dang.gam.che) is a shortening of the phrase 당연한 것들을 당연하게 만들어주시는 감사한 분들의 일을 체험하는 (RR: Dang-yeonhan geotdeureul dang-yeonhage mandeureojusineun gamsahan bundeurui ireul cheheomhaneun, lit. "experiencing the work of people who make common things possible").)	Hoshi	Milk Team (Jeonghan, Joshua, Jun, Hoshi, The8, DK, Seungkwan & Vernon) · Coffee Team (S.Coups, Hoshi, Wonwoo & Dino)	July 15, 2019
64	11	"Dang-Dang-Gam-Che" (Part 2)	Hoshi	Milk Team (Jeonghan, Joshua, Jun, Hoshi, The8, DK, Seungkwan, Vernon) · Coffee Team (S.Coups, Hoshi, Wonwoo, Dino)	July 29, 2019
65	12	"SVT Trip" (Part 1)	—	—	August 12, 2019
66	13	"SVT Trip" (Part 2)	—	—	August 26, 2019
67	14	"MBTI of SVT" (Part 1)	—	—	September 9, 2019
68	15	"MBTI of SVT" (Part 2)	—	—	September 23, 2019
69	16	"MBTI of SVT" (Part 3)	—	—	September 30, 2019
70	17	"Escape Singing Room" (Part 1)	—	— (Note: An initial grouping setup was made by the production team, but it is decided later that all members of Seventeen will take on the challenge together as one team.)	October 7, 2019
71	18	"Escape Singing Room" (Part 2)	—	—	October 21, 2019
72	19	"Debate Night" (Part 1) (Note: Korean title: 논리나잇; RR: Nollinait; lit. "Logic night")	Wonwoo	Team Interstellar (S.Coups, Joshua, Jun, Mingyu, Seungkwan & Dino) · Team Currently (Jeonghan, Hoshi, Woozi, The8, DK & Vernon)	October 28, 2019
73	20	"Debate Night" (Part 2)	Wonwoo	Team Interstellar (S.Coups, Joshua, Jun, Mingyu, Seungkwan & Dino) · Team Currently (Jeonghan, Hoshi, Woozi, The8, DK & Vernon)	November 4, 2019
The members of Seventeen form teams and debate on various nonsense topics.
74	21	"TTT (Camping Ver.)" (Part 1)	—	—	November 4, 2019
75	22	"TTT (Camping Ver.)" (Part 2)	—	—	November 18, 2019
76	23	"TTT (Camping Ver.)" (Part 3)	—	—	December 2, 2019
77	24	"SVT Playground" (Part 1)	—	—	December 9, 2019
78	25	"SVT Playground" (Part 2) "SVT Secret Santa" (Part 1)	—	—	December 16, 2019
79	26	"SVT Secret Santa" (Part 2)	—	—	December 23, 2019
—	—	"TTT Compilation"	—	—	December 29, 2019
80	27	"The Secret Life of Going Sevong" (Part 1) (Note: Korean title: 세봉이의 상상은 현실이 된다; RR: Sebong-i-ui sangsang-eun hyeonsiri doenda; lit. "Sevong's imagination becomes reality.")	Jeonghan	—	December 30, 2019
81	28	"The Secret Life of Going Sevong" (Part 2)	Jeonghan	—	January 6, 2020
In the last two episodes of Going Seventeen 2019, Jeonghan leads a meeting among members of Seventeen to discuss ideas and concepts for next year's Going Seventeen 2020, for which they will be implementing a project dubbed "Monthly Seventeen"—each of the members' ideas will be featured per month. Each member is also interviewed one by one by the production team about their ideas for next year's Going Seventeen 2020.

=== Going Seventeen 2020 ===
This season consists of episodes that are part of Seventeen's "Monthly Seventeen" project (from Going Seventeen 2019's Eps. 27-28: "The Secret Life of Going Sevong"), wherein each member contributes an episode concept that will be featured per month within the season's period.

No. overall	No. in season	Title	Host	Teams	Original release date
82	1	"Mystery Mystery" (Part 1)	DK	—	January 27, 2020
Seventeen takes on the challenge of eating traditional Korean dishes in various ways depending on the kind of utensil to be used, the additional ingredient added to the food, and the permitted duration and loudness of eating.
83	2	"Mystery Mystery" (Part 2)	DK	—	February 3, 2020
(cont'd from previous episode) Each member is challenged to choose among 20 drinking cups which contain either sikhye, vinegar or dissolved salt.
84	3	"Don't Lie" (Part 1) (Note: Korean title: 돈't Lie; RR: Don't Lie The Korean word 돈 (don) literally means "money".)	—	Citizens S.Coups, Joshua [as Doctor], Jun, Wonwoo, Woozi, DK, Mingyu, Seungkwan [as Police], Vernon & Dino Mafia Jeonghan, Hoshi & The8	February 10, 2020
85	4	"Don't Lie" (Part 2)	—	Citizens S.Coups, Joshua [as Doctor], Jun, Wonwoo, Woozi, DK, Mingyu, Seungkwan [as Police], Vernon & Dino Mafia Jeonghan, Hoshi & The8	February 17, 2020
Seventeen play a hybrid of the Mafia and treasure hunt games. The Citizens have to deduce the identities of and eliminate the three Mafias hiding amongst them while they hunt for a bundle of ₩500,000 cash that was concealed somewhere within the game area by the Mafias themselves. Before treasure hunting, they have to play a mini-game to determine the extra time added to the regular 5-minute searching time. Result The Mafia wins.
86	5	"Boo Seung-kwan's Past Life Destiny" (Part 1) (Note: Korean title: 부승관의 전생연분; RR: Buseunggwanui jeonsaeng-yeonbun The episode is a spin-off of the 2002–2003 MBC variety show Match Made in the Heaven (강호동의 천생연분; Ganghodong-ui cheonsaeng-yeonbun; lit. 'Kang Ho-dong's Soulmates'))	Seungkwan	various (Note: In this episode, the members of Seventeen form pairs that will change (i.e. they will be allowed to change partners) in the latter parts of the episode.)	February 24, 2020
87	6	"Boo Seung-kwan's Past Life Destiny" (Part 2)	Seungkwan	various	March 2, 2020
88	7	"Boo Seung-kwan's Past Life Destiny" (Part 3)	Seungkwan	various	March 9, 2020
Members of Seventeen form pairs by making themselves appealing to a fellow member of their choice. The pairs play various games and the members are later given a chance to change partners. Result Vernon and Dino win.
89	8	"Insomnia-Zero" (Part 1)	Hoshi	—	March 16, 2020
90	9	"Insomnia-Zero" (Part 2)	Hoshi	—	March 23, 2020
Members of Seventeen take on the challenge of trying to fall asleep, or at least maintain a stable heart rate while lying down, within three minutes for three rounds. While a member tries to sleep, his fellow members shall try distracting him by teasing him (round 1), making jokes (round 2), and live recording absurd food ASMR and letting him listen to it through earphones (round 3). In each round, three members with the most stable heart rate can go home while losers proceed to the next round and repeat the challenge. Result Woozi, who lost the challenge, has to try sleeping for the final time, leaving the set last.
91	10	"Seventeen Brain Survival" (Part 1)	—	Why Bother With? (Jun, Woozi, Seungkwan & Vernon) · Kwon-Kyu-Soo (Joshua, Hoshi & Mingyu) · Brainstorming (Wonwoo, The8, DK & Dino)	March 30, 2020
92	11	"Seventeen Brain Survival" (Part 2)	—	Why Bother With? (Jun, Woozi, Seungkwan & Vernon) · Kwon-Kyu-Soo (Joshua, Hoshi & Mingyu) · Brainstorming (Wonwoo, The8, DK & Dino)	April 6, 2020
Seventeen tries to determine who has the "best brain" in the group by playing different games. Result Mingyu wins.
93	12	"SVT Escape Room" (Part 1)	Jun	Mad scientist theme (Joshua, Jun, Hoshi & The8) · Murder case theme (Jeonghan, Wonwoo, DK & Mingyu) · Depressed pianist theme (Woozi, Seungkwan, Vernon & Dino)	April 14, 2020
94	13	"SVT Escape Room" (Part 2)	Jun	Mad scientist theme (Joshua, Jun, Hoshi & The8) · Murder case theme (Jeonghan, Wonwoo, DK & Mingyu) · Depressed pianist theme (Woozi, Seungkwan, Vernon & Dino)	April 20, 2020
In 3 separate groups, Seventeen tries completing themed escape rooms. The members from the team that takes the longest time to escape will participate individually in the upcoming "The Tag" episode (Eps. 27-28). 10 minutes is added to a team's total escape time for each hint used. Result Woozi, Seungkwan, Vernon & Dino finishes first and wins the challenge. Joshua, Jun, Hoshi & The8 took the longest time to escape and will participate individually in the upcoming "The Tag" episode (Eps. 27-28).
95	14	"Delivery Food Fighter" (Part 1)	—	—	April 27, 2020
Members of Seventeen eat various takeout foods around Gangnam while only telling lies (any factual information accidentally mentioned during the filming is intentionally edited out). They visit Nonhyeon-dong for Korean food, and Yeoksam-dong for Mexican and American food.
96	15	"Delivery Food Fighter" (Part 2)	—	—	May 4, 2020
(cont'd from previous episode) They visit Samseong-dong for Chinese food, and Cheongdam-dong for dessert.
97	16	"Human Chess" (Part 1)	Wonwoo	Team Wonwoo (S.Coups, Jun, Wonwoo, Woozi, DK & Seungkwan) · Team Mingyu (Jeonghan, Joshua, Hoshi, The8, Mingyu, Vernon & Dino)	May 11, 2020
98	17	"Human Chess" (Part 2)	Wonwoo	Team Wonwoo (S.Coups, Jun, Wonwoo, Woozi, DK & Seungkwan) · Team Mingyu (Jeonghan, Joshua, Hoshi, The8, Mingyu, Vernon & Dino)	May 18, 2020
Seventeen plays a modified version of human chess, wherein a player on the chessboard shall play the secret game of the attacking player and the losing player is eliminated. Result Team Wonwoo wins.
99	18	"Debate Night II" (Part 1)	Wonwoo	Hold Up (S.Coups, Jun, Woozi, Mingyu, Seungkwan & Dino) · Kkikkikki (Jeonghan, Joshua, Hoshi, The8, DK & Vernon)	June 1, 2020
100	19	"Debate Night II" (Part 2)	Wonwoo	Hold Up (S.Coups, Jun, Woozi, Mingyu, Seungkwan & Dino) · Kkikkikki (Jeonghan, Joshua, Hoshi, The8, DK & Vernon)	June 8, 2020
In the 2nd installment of "Debate Night", Seventeen forms new teams and debate on various nonsense topics.
101	20	"Pie in the Sky"	—	—	June 15, 2020
Summary (with spoiler) The winning team of Seventeen's human chess (Team Wonwoo) in Episodes 16-17 have a nice meal while the losing team (Team Mingyu) serves the dishes. To be able to join Team's Wonwoo's winning meal, Hoshi and Jeonghan used the wish coupons they won from Going Seventeen 2019's Episodes 17-18 ("Escape Singing Room") and Episode 24 ("SVT Playground" Part 2), respectively.
102	21	"Four-wheeled Rider" (Part 1)	Jeonghan	S.Coups, Jeonghan, Hoshi, Woozi, DK & Mingyu · Joshua, Jun, Wonwoo, The8, Seungkwan, Vernon & Dino	June 29, 2020
103	22	"Four-wheeled Rider" (Part 2)	Jeonghan	S.Coups, Jeonghan, Hoshi, Woozi, DK & Mingyu · Joshua, Jun, Wonwoo, The8, Seungkwan, Vernon & Dino	July 6, 2020
In Gimpo, Seventeen divides into two teams and compete in Kartrider-style go-kart racing. Result S.Coups, Hoshi and Mingyu win 3rd, 2nd and 1st place, respectively. Joshua, The8 and Vernon face the penalty of washing Seventeen's minivan.
104	23	"Ad-lib: Seventeen's Got Talent" (Part 1) (Note: The episode's title alludes to the British TV talent show franchise Got Talent.)	—	Judges (S.Coups, Jeonghan & Seungkwan) · Auditionees (all other members of Seventeen)	July 13, 2020
105	24	"Ad-lib: Seventeen's Got Talent" (Part 2)	—	Judges (S.Coups, Jeonghan & Seungkwan) · Auditionees (all other members of Seventeen)	July 20, 2020
Members of Seventeen play a skit wherein ten of them act as auditionees for a talent show while the remaining three members act as the audition's judges. An EMS massager is attached to each of them and will attack a member once he laughs.
106	25	"The8 and the 12 Shadows" (Part 1)	The8	—	July 27, 2020
107	26	"The8 and the 12 Shadows" (Part 2)	The8	—	August 3, 2020
Members of Seventeen play a game wherein they move in file around the game area and the 2nd up to the 13th (last) player in the queue—collectively called the Shadows—shall imitate the actions and words of the Leader, the 1st player in the queue. Starting with The8, the Leader changes every after five minutes until all thirteen members have become Leaders.
108	27	"The Tag" (Part 1)	Jun	1st Entrant (Jun, Woozi, Vernon & Dino) · 2nd Entrant (Jeonghan & Wonwoo) · 3rd Entrant (Mingyu & Seungkwan) · 4th Entrant (Joshua & Hoshi) · 5th Entrant (The8) · Last Entrant (S.Coups & DK)	August 10, 2020
109	28	"The Tag" (Part 2)	Jun	1st Entrant (Jun, Woozi, Vernon & Dino) · 2nd Entrant (Jeonghan & Wonwoo) · 3rd Entrant (Mingyu & Seungkwan) · 4th Entrant (Joshua & Hoshi) · 5th Entrant (The8) · Last Entrant (S.Coups & DK)	August 17, 2020
With a dark abandoned factory as the game area, Seventeen plays a modified game of tag wherein each group of players shall search the game area for the exit door key and avoid getting tagged by the game's three It's who are cosplaying various horror fiction antagonists. Though an original grouping set-up was determined through Episodes 12-13 ("SVT Escape Room"), the faint-hearted members either use wish coupons they won from previous episodes or negotiate with other members, resulting to a slightly different grouping set-up.
110	29	"Christmas in August" (Part 1)	Vernon	Super Bunny Man (S.Coups, The8, Mingyu, Vernon & Dino) · Getting Over It (Joshua, Jun, Wonwoo & DK) · Stilt Fella (Jeonghan, Hoshi, Woozi & Seungkwan)	August 24, 2020
111	30	"Christmas in August" (Part 2)	Vernon	Super Bunny Man (S.Coups, The8, Mingyu, Vernon & Dino) · Getting Over It (Joshua, Jun, Wonwoo & DK) · Stilt Fella (Jeonghan, Hoshi, Woozi & Seungkwan)	August 31, 2020
Forming three teams, members of Seventeen play video games within three hours inside rooms warmed up to 30°C while the members wear Santa suits. Result The Super Bunny Man Team finishes first, while the Getting Over It Team remains unfinished by the end of the time limit.
112	31	"Mousebusters" (Part 1) (Note: The episode's title alludes to the 1984 American film Ghostbusters.)	—	Rats (Jun, Hoshi, Wonwoo & Woozi) · Mousebusters (all other members of Seventeen)	September 7, 2020
113	32	"Mousebusters" (Part 2)	—	Rats (Jun, Hoshi, Wonwoo & Woozi) · Mousebusters (all other members of Seventeen)	September 14, 2020
114	33	"Mousebusters" (Part 3)	—	Rats (Jun, Hoshi, Wonwoo & Woozi) · Mousebusters (all other members of Seventeen)	September 21, 2020
Seventeen plays a modified hide-and-seek game wherein nine players called Mousebusters shall find and eliminate four Rats hiding within the game area. Result The Rats win. After negotiations, it is decided that only one Mousebuster shall receive the penalty. DK, who lost the penalty mini-games, face the penalty of being smacked with a pillow showered with flour.
115	34	"Bad Clue" (Part 1)	Woozi	—	September 28, 2020
116	35	"Bad Clue" (Part 2)	Woozi	—	October 5, 2020
Members of Seventeen (except Seungkwan) play a role-playing game wherein the twelve players assume the roles of characters in a narrative about twelve guests attending a secret party hosted by Park Tae-san, the Chairman of bSK Group. The players have to deduce the secrets of the Park family as they run into shocking hints within the venue and guests start disappearing one by one. Result As the game verges to a chilling end, Mingyu (as Chairman Park Tae-san's grandson Park Min-gyu) is the only one left within the venue until he himself disappears. In the epilogue, Seungkwan (as a TV anchor) reports about the "bSK Group massacre" and reveals that Park Min-gyu, who is afflicted with dissociative identity disorder and is believed to be both the incident's sole survivor and prime suspect, is missing. In the post-credits scene, it is revealed that Park Min-gyu is indeed the culprit behind the party massacre, killing off each guest in his other personality, that of his father Park Joon-gi who, according to the game's narrative, committed suicide due to severe physical abuse from his father, Chairman Park Tae-san. During the final moments of the game, Min-gyu's original self is said to have succumbed to this other personality which then urged him to ultimately kill himself, thus player Mingyu's disappearance from the game area. To carry out the "killings" (i.e. elimination from the game), the production staff had all players "guess" the order of player eliminations by writing a list of the players' names on a sheet of paper before the game officially starts—the staff then followed Mingyu's list.
117	36	"SVTside Out" (Note: The episode's title (read as Seventeen-side Out) alludes to the 2015 animated film Inside Out.)	—	—	October 12, 2020
Members of Seventeen (except Seungkwan) play inside an indoor sports playground in Hanam while they pretend to be inside Seungkwan's mind by behaving according to Seungkwan's six emotions (joy, sadness, timidity, rage, surprise, sentimentality).
118	37	"Bungee Jump" (Part 1) (Note: The episode's original Korean title 천고마비 (Hanja: 天高馬肥; RR: Cheon-gomabi; lit: "High sky, fat horse" or "The sky is high and the horse is fat") is a Sino-Korean expression used to describe autumn as a season of abundance. However, the last two syllables of this expression (—마비, —mabi) has exactly the same sound to another Sino-Korean word (痲痺→마비, mabi) which means "to be paralyzed" or "paralysis". Going Seventeen uses this word play to establish the expression's meaning in the context of this episode: "High sky paralysis" or "Getting paralyzed while high up (in the sky)".)	Dino	—	October 26, 2020
119	38	"Bungee Jump" (Part 2)	Dino	—	November 9, 2020
Seventeen plays various mini-games to determine who among them shall proceed to bungee jumping.
120	39	"Carnival" (Note: The title alludes to the brand of the minivan used in this episode. The mention of this brand was not a product placement, though the vehicle played a central role in the episode.)	Joshua	—	November 23, 2020
In the first ever "failure" of Going Seventeen to produce content, members of Seventeen are given a chance to release their stress and protest against the production team who are hanging their heads down in apology.
121	40	"Don't Lie II" (Part 1)	—	Citizens S.Coups, Jeonghan [as Broker], Joshua, Jun, Hoshi, Wonwoo [as Doctor], Woozi [as Police], DK, The8 & Seungkwan Mafia Mingyu, Vernon & Dino	November 30, 2020
122	41	"Don't Lie II" (Part 2)	—	Citizens S.Coups, Jeonghan [as Broker], Joshua, Jun, Hoshi, Wonwoo [as Doctor], Woozi [as Police], The8, DK & Seungkwan Mafia Mingyu, Vernon & Dino	December 7, 2020
In the second installment of the "Don't Lie" episode series, an additional role called "Broker" is added to the game's participants. Determining the amount of time added to the regular searching time (5 minutes) is determined through a "liar game", i.e. a player should make a untruthful statement without the other players noticing the lie. Result The surviving Citizens successfully eliminate all Mafiosi and decide to share the prize among them.
123	42	"Going vs. Seventeen" (Part 1)	S.Coups	Seventeen · Going Seventeen Production Team	December 14, 2020
124	43	"Going vs. Seventeen" (Part 2)	S.Coups	Seventeen · Going Seventeen Production Team	December 21, 2020
Seventeen engages in a friendly tournament against the Going Seventeen production team. The games to be played and the players from the two sides for each game are chosen through drawing lots, and a team should win three games out of a total of five in order to win the tournament. If Seventeen wins, the Going Seventeen production team's contract will be extended by a number of years (to be determined through Seventeen's discretion). If the Going Seventeen production team wins, Seventeen will edit the episode's post-credits scene and pay for the production team's dinner. Result Seventeen wins (3-2) and secures their victory through an additional game which also resulted to their win.
125	44	"TTT (Hyperrealism Ver.)" (Part 1)	—	—	December 28, 2020
126	45	"TTT (Hyperrealism Ver.)" (Part 2)	—	—	January 4, 2021
In Going Seventeen's third "TTT", Seventeen enjoys the company of each other in an unscripted, "hyperrealistic" year-end MT.
127	46	"Going" (Part 1)	Mingyu	—	January 11, 2021
128	47	"Going" (Part 2)	Mingyu	—	January 18, 2021
Mingyu leads Seventeen in self-producing their photo magazine Going. Mingyu acts as the main photographer, along with his assistants S.Coups and Dino. Joshua and The8 as fashion stylists; Jun and Woozi as hair stylists; Wonwoo as the videographer in-charge for documenting the shoot's behind-the-scenes; and Seungkwan, DK and Hoshi as DJs for the shoot's after-party.
—	—	"Going Seventeen 2020 CARAT Awards"	Seventeen	—	April 7, 2021
Seventeen presents the top 13 episodes of Going Seventeen 2020 as ranked by their fans. The Top 13 Episodes of Going Seventeen 2020: 1. "TTT (Hyperrealism Ver.)" (Eps. 44-45) - 19.5%; 2. "Don't Lie II" (Eps. 40-41) - 8.4%; 3. "The Tag" (Eps. 27-28) - 8.0%; 4. "Bad Clue" (Eps. 34-35) - 6.7%; 5. "Insomnia-Zero" (Eps. 8-9) - 5.7%; 6. "Four-wheeled Rider" (Eps. 21-22) - 5.2%; 7. "Ad-lib: Seventeen's Got Talent" (Eps. 23-24) - 5.2%; 8. "Don't Lie" (Eps. 3-4) - 4.8%; 9. "Carnival" (Ep. 39) - 4.7%; 10. "Mousebusters" (Eps. 31-33) - 3.7%; 11. "Boo Seung-kwan's Past Life Destiny" (Eps. 5-7) - 3.7%; 12. "Going" (Eps. 46-47) - 3.5%; 13. "Debate Night II" (Eps. 18-19) - 3.5%

=== Going Seventeen (2021–present) ===
Since 2021, new seasons of Going Seventeen have continued sequentially from the previous year, although the title card is changed to mark the beginning of a new season.

==== Part 1 (April 2021–January 2022) ====
No. overall	No. in season	Title	Host	Teams	Original release date
129	1	"Ad-lib: Going Company" (Part 1)	—	—	April 14, 2021
130	2	"Ad-lib: Going Company" (Part 2)	—	—	April 21, 2021
Members of Seventeen play a skit wherein they act as employees of "Going Company" while being interrupted from time to time by an EMS massager attached to each of them. The things or ideas mentioned in the skit will be used by the Going Seventeen production team in developing concepts for future episodes.
131	3	"One Million Won" (Part 1)	—	Jeonghan · All other members of Seventeen	April 28, 2021
132	4	"One Million Won" (Part 2)	—	Jeonghan · All other members of Seventeen	May 5, 2021
12 members of Seventeen engage in a game of wits and loyalty against Jeonghan: the 12 members have to safekeep their ₩1,000,000 award money as Jeonghan talks privately to each of them to convince them to side with him by handing over their award money to him. Pressured by game conditions favorable to Jeonghan, the 12 members can either give to or steal money from Jeonghan by writing an amount (ranging from ₩0 to ₩1,000,000) on a blank check. Result The 12 members win against Jeonghan, successfully keeping most of the award money for themselves (₩959,999 – ₩40,001 in favor of the 12 members).
133	5	"Let's Go, Seventeen!" (Part 1) (Note: Korean title: 출발 세븐틴; RR: Chulbal sebeuntin The episode is a spin-off of the 1999–2016 KBS game show Let's Go, Dream Team! (출발 드림팀; RR: Chulbal deurimtim).)	Woozi (Note: Woozi is given the privilege to choose which team to join.)	Like the 'Carnival', You're Always in the Same Place (S.Coups, Joshua, Wonwoo, Seungkwan, Vernon & Dino) (Note: Korean name: 카니발전이 없는 너는 평생 제자리걸음; RR: Kanibaljeoni eomneun neoneun pyeongsaeng jejarigeoreum This team name alludes to Going Seventeen 2020's Episode 39: "Carnival".) · Jihoon-ah (Jeonghan, Jun, Hoshi, Woozi, The8, Mingyu & DK) (Note: Korean name: 지훈아; RR: Jihuna; lit. "Ji-hoon!" This team name uses Woozi's real given name Ji-hoon (지훈) in the vocative case (–아, RR: –a), as if addressing or calling Woozi.)	May 12, 2021
134	6	"Let's Go, Seventeen!" (Part 2)	Woozi	Like the 'Carnival', You're Always in the Same Place (S.Coups, Joshua, Wonwoo, Seungkwan, Vernon & Dino) · Jihoon-ah (Jeonghan, Jun, Hoshi, Woozi, The8, Mingyu & DK)	May 19, 2021
Seventeen divides into two teams that compete in a race through an inflatable obstacle course. Result Team "Like the 'Carnival', You're Always in the Same Place" wins.
135	7	"Treasure Island: 13 Raiders" (Part 1) (Note: The episode's title alludes to the 1981 film Raiders of the Lost Ark, the first entry of the Indiana Jones film series.)	—	—	June 2, 2021 (Note: "Treasure Island: 13 Raiders" pts. 1 and 2 were pre-released on JTBC2 on May 27, 2021 and June 3, 2021, respectively. This led to the two episodes being released on Going Seventeen's major platforms (YouTube, VLive and Weverse) a week later than the regular schedule.)
136	8	"Treasure Island: 13 Raiders" (Part 2)	—	—	June 9, 2021
In an island, Seventeen engages in a treasure hunt game while finding the missing pieces of the map that will lead them to the prize. Result Wonwoo and The8 successfully find the treasure box, but the treasure itself is nowhere to be found. In the closing part, it is revealed that the treasure was taken by intruders who entered the island while the episode was being filmed.
137	9	"Don't Lie III" (Part 1)	—	Citizens All members of Seventeen [Doctor: Dino; Police: S.Coups; Brokers: Jeonghan & The8] Mafia Going Seventeen production team	June 16, 2021
138	10	"Don't Lie III" (Part 2)	—	Citizens All members of Seventeen [Doctor: Dino; Police: S.Coups; Brokers: Jeonghan & The8] Mafia Going Seventeen production team	June 23, 2021
In the third installment of the "Don't Lie" episode series, an additional Broker is added to the game's participants, i.e. 3 Mafia and 10 Citizens (with 1 Doctor, 1 Police and 2 Brokers). Determining the amount of time added to the regular searching time (5 minutes) is determined through a lie detection test. Result As the game verges to its end, the Citizens correctly deduce that there is actually no Mafia among the 13 players. It is revealed later that the Going Seventeen production team has taken the role of Mafia while the 2 Brokers were given the privilege to be aware of this set-up; thus, the game set-up has been Brokers versus the other Citizens. Mingyu, who found the ₩500,000 cash prize first, wins the game.
139	11	"Ad Genius Seventeen"	Joshua	—	June 30, 2021
Employing free product placement, the members of Seventeen make hilarious skits wherein they enact television advertisements that showcase "new features" in various products presented to them by the production team, in order to appeal to advertisers who might see them as prospects for acting in their TV ads.
140	12	"Roulette Life" (Part 1)	Jeonghan	Hotel Suite Room (S.Coups, Jun, Woozi, DK & Mingyu) · Mt. Bukhan (Joshua, Hoshi & Wonwoo) · Incheon Airport (The8, Seungkwan & Vernon) · Hybe Corporation's new office building (Jeonghan & Dino)	July 7, 2021
141	13	"Roulette Life" (Part 2)	Jeonghan	Hotel Suite Room (S.Coups, Jun, Woozi, DK & Mingyu) · Mt. Bukhansan (Joshua, Hoshi & Wonwoo) · Incheon Airport (The8, Seungkwan & Vernon) · Hybe Corporation's new office building (Jeonghan & Dino)	July 14, 2021
Members of Seventeen take on various challenges that they have to do in a specific place and in a specific manner. The "what" and "where" of each member's challenge is chosen by shooting sticky darts at two vertical roulette wheels. After grouping according to the place where they will do their challenges, each team shall choose the "how" of their challenges by shooting at a third roulette. The team who violates their chosen "how" condition the most number of times will face a penalty. Result The Mt. Bukhansan team, who violated their chosen "how" condition (no laughing) the most number of times, faced the penalty: they shall return to the episode's main venue and snap the ending clapperboard, leaving the set last along with the production team.
142	14	"Planting Rice and Making Bets" (Part 1) (Note: Korean title: 버논에서 모처럼 모내기를 하며 모든 내기를 해보았다; RR: Beononeseo mocheoreom monaegireul hamyeo modeun naegireul haeboatda; lit. "Making every bet while planting rice in 'Ver-Paddy'" The first word 버논(에서) [beonon(eseo); (at the) Ver-Paddy] is a word play the combines Seventeen member Vernon's stage name as written in Korean (버논, Beonon) and the word 논 (non), which literally means "paddy".)	—	—	July 21, 2021
143	15	"Planting Rice and Making Bets" (Part 2)	—	—	July 28, 2021
Seventeen plants rice while being challenged every 10 minutes with bets the members have to win in order to be able to leave the paddy field.
144	16	"Kickball" (Part 1)	—	Umpire (The8) · Chicken Scratch (S.Coups, Jeonghan, Joshua, Wonwoo, Woozi & Seungkwan) · Samseong-dong Cutlassfish Kickball (Jun, Hoshi, DK, Mingyu, Vernon & Dino)	August 4, 2021
145	17	"Kickball" (Part 2)	—	Umpire (The8) · Chicken Scratch (S.Coups, Jeonghan, Joshua, Wonwoo, Woozi & Seungkwan) · Samseong-dong Cutlassfish Kickball (Jun, Hoshi, DK, Mingyu, Vernon & Dino)	August 11, 2021
Seventeen divide into two teams and play a modified version of kickball that includes various advantageous and handicap items. Result Team "Samseong-dong Cutlassfish Kickball" wins.
146	18	"Dive into TTT (Water Sports Ver.)" (Part 1)	—	—	August 18, 2021
147	19	"Dive into TTT (Water Sports Ver.)" (Part 2)	—	—	August 25, 2021
148	20	"Dive into TTT (Water Sports Ver.)" (Part 3)	—	—	September 1, 2021
In Going Seventeen's fourth "TTT", Seventeen enjoys the company of each other in another unscripted MT done in the summer in a resort in Gapyeong.
149	21	"Debate Night III" (Part 1)	Wonwoo	various (Note: The members of Seventeen are allowed to choose which side of the debate they prefer, so the lineup of the two debate teams vary per round.)	September 8, 2021
150	22	"Debate Night III" (Part 2)	Wonwoo	various	September 15, 2021
In the 3rd installment of "Debate Night", Seventeen forms new teams and debate on various nonsense topics.
151	23	"Tribal Games" (Part 1) (Note: Korean title: 부족오락관; RR: Bujogorakgwan, lit. "Tribal entertainment")	Seungkwan	Camel Team (S.Coups, Woozi, The8, DK, Vernon & Dino) · Tiger Team (Jeonghan, Joshua, Jun, Hoshi, Wonwoo & Mingyu)	September 22, 2021
Seventeen are grouped into two teams and compete in various popular games from the 1984–2009 KBS variety show Family Entertainment. (Note: Korean title: 가족오락관; RR: Gajogorakgwan) The winning group will get a set of top-grade Hanu beef. For the first half, the two teams play: 1. One Voice (Igudongseong) — The playing team is given a four-syllable keyword. Four players shall shout in unison a different syllable from the keyword, while the remaining players just have to move their lips, i.e. faking to shout a syllable. The opposing team have to guess the keyword by trying to discern the syllables being shouted and string them together into one word while making sure they will not be fooled by those who are only pretending to shout.; 2. Mysteriously Who Gets His Turn (Alssongdalssong bokbulbok) — The members of the playing team are tasked to do apparently similar tasks except for one player who is doing a task different from the rest. The opposing team has to guess the odd man out who must pretend to be doing the same task as his co-members so as not to get caught. To add difficulty to the playing team, they are not told in advance which among the items they will take is the odd one out.; 3. Between Rooms (Banggwa bang sai) — A hybrid of message relay and charades, the game sees the members of the playing team forming a line and passing the keyword from the first player to the last player by miming, i.e. acting out the keyword without speaking or vocal sounds. The last player in the line makes a guess of the keyword to the MC (Seungkwan); if he fails, the preceding players try to guess the keyword one by one but with point deductions.; Result During halftime, the Camel Team wins (450–430).
152	24	"Tribal Games" (Part 2)	Seungkwan	Camel Team (S.Coups, Woozi, The8, DK, Vernon & Dino) · Tiger Team (Jeonghan, Joshua, Jun, Hoshi, Wonwoo & Mingyu)	September 29, 2021
(cont'd from previous episode) For the second half, the two teams play: 1. Shouting in Silence (goyosogui oechim) — A message relay game with a twist, this requires the members of the playing team to form a line and pass the keyword from the first player to the last player while wearing headphones that play music loud enough to cancel out the players' voices. The last player in the line then verifies the keyword to the MC.; 2. Bonus Game: Shouting in Silence (New Journey to the West version) — The modern variation of the original Family Entertainment's version, this game is played by pairs and the keyword must be described or explained (instead of simply shouting out the keyword itself) by the first player to the second player who shall guess the keyword. One member from each of the two teams are chosen to play this game against the MC.; 3. 99 Seconds on Standby, Cue! (Gusipgucho seutaenbai, kyu!) — The playing team is challenged to accomplish a set of seven missions within just 99 seconds. When the playing team fails, the opposing team will be given a chance to try the challenge.; Result The Tiger Team wins the entire competition (850–570).
153	25	"Catch Stock" (Part 1)	—	Jun Team (S.Coups, Jeonghan, Jun, Woozi, The8, Vernon & Dino) · Mingyu Team (Joshua, Hoshi, Wonwoo, DK, Mingyu & Seungkwan)	October 6, 2021
154	26	"Catch Stock" (Part 2)	—	Jun Team (S.Coups, Jeonghan, Jun, Woozi, The8, Vernon & Dino) · Mingyu Team (Joshua, Hoshi, Wonwoo, DK, Mingyu & Seungkwan)	October 13, 2021
Seventeen plays a modified game of tag wherein the offense team, acting like investors, search for and catch members of the defense team who are scattered within the game area, each of them representing a stock of certain value. Result Jun Team wins.
155	27	"Ego" (Part 1) (Note: The episode, introduced as a "Going Original Series", contains themes of horror and some scenes may trigger photosensitive epilepsy to those who are susceptible. Viewer discretion is advised.)	—	1st Entrant (Hoshi & Dino) · 2nd Entrant (S.Coups & Joshua) · 3rd Entrant (Jeonghan & DK)	October 20, 2021
156	28	"Ego" (Part 2)	—	4th Entrant (Wonwoo & Woozi) · 5th Entrant (Seungkwan & Vernon) · 6th Entrant (Mingyu)	October 27, 2021
Seventeen engages in a role-playing game wherein the members wake up in pairs per round and find themselves in an abandoned research center filled with gory remnants of a series of failed human experimentations. In each round, the playing pair of players try to find their way out of the abandoned research center while deducing the truth behind it before they are caught by a masked man lurking in the dark corners of the building. After the elimination of a previous pair, the next pair are given clues from the previous pair's discoveries and the mistakes that led to their capture. Result The first up to the third pairs all fail to escape the building. The fourth and fifth pairs both fail to escape the building but are closer to their escape than the previous pairs. The last player Mingyu, who ventures out alone for the mission, correctly deduces that he and all of the previous players were clones, and he was able to escape from the building. But it is portrayed in the final seconds of the episode that he himself is eliminated from the game by the masked man who unmasks himself and is revealed to look exactly like Mingyu. The narrative of the game is completed in the final seconds of the episode and in the post-credits. A group of eleven mad scientists immersed themselves in a research on human cloning, resorting to unethical human experimentations that mostly ended in failure and casualties. Later, they successfully made clones of themselves which inadvertently developed self-awareness. The scientists, by pairs (except for their leader Dr. Arthur Kim), tested each of their respective clones' capacity to retain memories and consciousness in an experiment that allowed them to gather clues towards their escape out of the building (the "Ego" escape game). As the experiment progressed, they captured and shot down their clones as they get closer and closer to their escape, including the one who successfully broke out of the building (Dr. Kim's clone). For this episode, the members of Seventeen played double roles: as Dr. Kim and his fellow scientists, and their clones (the roles of the players in the game).
157	29	"Insomnia-Zero II" (Part 1)	Hoshi	Seventeen · Going Seventeen Production Team (Sound Team, Lighting Team and Filming Team)	November 3, 2021
In the 2nd installment of "Insomnia-Zero", members of Seventeen once again take on the challenge of trying to fall asleep, or at least maintain a stable heart rate while lying down, within three minutes for three rounds. In each round, three members with the most stable heart rate can go home while losers proceed to the next round and repeat the challenge. Also, the Going Seventeen production staff joins the challenge by offering one member from the sound team, lighting team and filming team in the 1st, 2nd and 3rd rounds, respectively. If the representative staff member clears the challenge, his/her team can go home (leaving Seventeen with less production staff members in the set for the next rounds); otherwise, the team remains. While a Seventeen member and a production staff member try to sleep, the other band members shall try distracting the two challengers by teasing them (round 1).
158	30	"Insomnia-Zero II" (Part 2)	Hoshi	Seventeen · Going Seventeen Production Team (Sound Team, Lighting Team and Filming Team)	November 10, 2021
(cont'd from previous episode) For the next rounds, the members of Seventeen try distracting the playing co-member and staff member by live recording "stream of consciousness" jokes (round 2) and freestyle recording (round 3) while letting them listen to it through earphones. Result Once again, Woozi loses the challenge and has to try sleeping for the final time, leaving the set last.
159	31	"Best Friends" (Part 1)	—	—	November 17, 2021
In a tribute to graduating high school students taking the South Korean College Scholastic Ability Test (CSAT), members of Seventeen play a comedy skit wherein they act as 10th grade students in their first day at "Sebong High School". Dino plays a double role as a student (Lee Chan) and as homeroom teacher Mr. Lee Soon-eung who prefers having 10-minute classes and 50-minute recesses. During recess, the students engage in a hilarious, highly-modified play of table tennis.
160	32	"Best Friends" (Part 2)	—	—	November 24, 2021
(cont'd from previous episode) During the next two recesses, the students play Red Light, Green Light (Mugunghwa kkochi pi-eosseumnida.) (Note: Mugunghwa kkochi pi-eosseumnida (무궁화 꽃이 피었습니다, "The roses of Sharon have blossomed.") is a version of the popular children's game Statues originating from Korea.) and don-gaseu. (Note: Don-gaseu (돈가스), also known as donkkaseu (돈까스), is a Korean foot-stepping game wherein players leap into a circle drawn on the ground (don) and jump out of it, landing on both feet (gaseu). On each individual turn, a player tries to tag (eliminate) another player by stepping on that player's feet upon the gaseu exit landing.) Before the last class of the day ends, the students elect Chan as class president, and Chan leads his classmates in saying goodbye to Mr. Lee.
161	33	"SVT's Kitchen for Two" (Part 1)	—	Cooks (S.Coups & Jeonghan) · Customers (All other members of Seventeen)	December 1, 2021
Seventeen's eldest members S.Coups and Jeonghan become partners in tackling a "tough project": opening a Korean cuisine restaurant with their younger co-members as both their customers and evaluators of their performance.
162	34	"SVT's Kitchen for Two" (Part 2)	—	Cooks (S.Coups & Jeonghan) · Customers (All other members of Seventeen) · Part-Timers (Mingyu & DK)	December 8, 2021
(cont'd from previous episode) S.Coups and Jeonghan serve lunch to their co-members and pick out two of them as their "part-timers" who will help in preparing dinner.
163	35	"SVT's Kitchen for Two" (Part 3)	—	Cooks (S.Coups & Jeonghan) · Customers (All other members of Seventeen) · Part-Timers (Mingyu & DK)	December 15, 2021
(cont'd from previous episode) The duo are joined by their "part-timers" Mingyu and DK in preparing and serving ramen dishes for dinner for the remaining members. As reward, the production staff grants S.Coups and Jeonghan two wish coupons each and one wish coupon each for Mingyu and DK.
—	—	"Going Seventeen Special: Going Commentary"	Seventeen	—	January 19, 2022
Seventeen engages in a lively year-end commentary on Going Seventeen, (Note: Jun and The8, who were in China during the filming, present their thoughts on Going Seventeen through pre-recorded video messages.) reflecting on the show's performance throughout its broadcast history. The band also answers various questions from the viewers (crowdsourced through Seventeen's social media accounts in December 1–3, 2021).

==== Part 2 (February 2022–January 2023) ====
No. overall	No. in season	Title	Host	Teams	Original release date
164	36	"How to Eat Rice the Perfect Way" (Part 1)	—	—	February 9, 2022
165	37	"How to Eat Rice the Perfect Way" (Part 2)	—	—	February 16, 2022
The members of Seventeen compete in making what each of them think is the "perfect way" to consume rice. Scored based on the members and the production team's votes, the winner of the competition will be given the privilege for the whole 2022 to choose the kind of food/snacks that the staff shall prepare during the filming of Going Seventeen. Result Woozi wins; Jeonghan uses his wish coupon in order to take possession of Woozi's snack privilege.
166	38	"Infinite Going" (Part 1) (Note: Korean title: 무모한 고잉; RR: Mumohan going; lit. "Reckless Going [Seventeen]" The episode is a spin-off of the 2005–2018 MBC reality show Infinite Challenge (무한도전; Muhandojeon).)	Woozi	—	February 23, 2022
167	39	"Infinite Going" (Part 2)	Woozi (with Park Mun-ki as referee)	S.Coups & Joshua · Jeonghan & Vernon · Hoshi & Woozi · Wonwoo & Mingyu · DK & Director Kim Hyun-seok · Seungkwan & Dino	March 2, 2022
The members of Seventeen divide into pairs to compete in a very difficult challenge: each pair shall push a large motor vehicle running in neutral gear and race to a 50-meter finish line against another vehicle of exactly the same type but is in driving mode. Before the official start of the competition, the members undergo various physical and mental trainings. Result S.Coups and Joshua win.
168	40	"The Truman Show of Mr. SVT’s We Live Alone" (Part 1) (Note: The episode's title and concept alludes to the 1998 American film The Truman Show and the MBC reality show I Live Alone.)	—	S.Coups, Jeonghan, Wonwoo, Mingyu & DK	March 9, 2022
169	41	"The Truman Show of Mr. SVT’s We Live Alone" (Part 2)	—	Joshua, Hoshi, Woozi, Seungkwan, Vernon & Dino	March 16, 2022
The members of Seventeen play the role of "Mr. Seventeen" whose solo life inside his residence is filmed for the Viewers to see, akin to The Truman Show and I Live Alone. Each member switches roles every 20 minutes, while the remaining members who are waiting for or have finished their turn wait at a separate room and act as the Viewers.
170	42	"SVTside Out II" (Part 1)	—	—	March 23, 2022
171	43	"SVTside Out II" (Part 2)	—	—	March 30, 2022
Members of Seventeen play inside a bowling alley while switching behaviors from time to time according to a set of thirteen emotions (joy, sullenness, love, sadness, annoyance, excitement, meanness, sentimentality, rage, bluffing, timidity, surprise and "tiger-like").
172	44	"GSVT E-Triathlon Championship 2022" (Part 1)	Seungkwan	You Mad? (S.Coups, The8 & DK) · Shinbangbboongbang (Jeonghan, Jun & Woozi) · ENFJ (Joshua, Mingyu & Dino) · SVT T1 (Hoshi, Wonwoo & Vernon)	April 13, 2022
The members of Seventeen are divided into four teams and compete for the most points in an esports "triathlon" in order to win ₩3,000,000. Each game is played as a tournament, with the ability to have Seungkwan (the host) play in place of one of the team members for a game if needed. In the first stage, all teams play Crazy Arcade. Result Team "SVT T1" wins 1st place.
173	45	"GSVT E-Triathlon Championship 2022" (Part 2)	Seungkwan	You Mad? (S.Coups, The8 & DK) · Shinbangbboongbang (Jeonghan, Jun & Woozi) · ENFJ (Joshua, Mingyu & Dino) · SVT T1 (Hoshi, Wonwoo & Vernon)	April 20, 2022
(cont'd from previous episode) In the second stage, all teams play Sudden Attack. Result Team "You Mad?" wins 1st place.
174	46	"GSVT E-Triathlon Championship 2022" (Part 3)	Seungkwan	You Mad? (S.Coups, The8 & DK) · Shinbangbboongbang (Jeonghan, Jun & Woozi) · ENFJ (Joshua, Mingyu & Dino) · SVT T1 (Hoshi, Wonwoo & Vernon)	April 27, 2022
(cont'd from previous episode) In the third and final stage, all teams play KartRider. Result Once again, Team "You Mad?" wins 1st place. Overall, Team "You Mad?" comes in 1st place and wins ₩3,000,000, while Team "Shinbangbboongbang" finishes 2nd, Team "SVT T1" 3rd and Team "ENFJ" last.
175	47	"Runner-Up Sports Day" (Part 1)	Wonwoo	various (Note: The members of Seventeen play quick games, such as rock paper scissors, to choose which teams they will be in for each round.)	May 4, 2022
176	48	"Runner-Up Sports Day" (Part 2)	Wonwoo	various	May 11, 2022
Members of Seventeen play various games but should only aim for second place; the player/s who finishes second will get the most points while those who finish first will get zero points. In reality, the members and the production staff play a prank on Jun: the members should furtively play the games in a way that it will lead to Jun's victory. If Jun wins the games (by finishing second place in the overall tally) without noticing their ruse, every member will receive a gift for Children's Day whereas only Jun will receive a gift if he wins and realizes he is being pranked. If Jun loses (by finishing either first place or third, fourth, etc. overall), no one receives a gift. Result The members succeed in secretly making Jun the games' overall winner.
—	—	"Going Seventeen Special: Going SVT X MMTG"	Seungkwan & Jaejae	"Insomnia-Zero" (Joshua, Jun, Woozi & DK) · "Debate Night" (S.Coups, Jeonghan & Dino) · "Don't Lie" (Hoshi, The8, Mingyu & Vernon)	June 1, 2022 (Note: Going Seventeen took a two-week break for Seventeen's promotion of their fourth studio album Face the Sun.)
The members of Seventeen expose MMTG host Jaejae to three of their best Going Seventeen contents ("Insomnia-Zero", "Debate Night" and "Don't Lie") and compete on which of these contents raises her heart rate the most.
177	49	"Seventeen Going Radio Show" (Part 1)	S.Coups · Joshua & Vernon · Mingyu	Classy Conversation for a Classy Life (Host: S.Coups; Guests: Wonwoo, Woozi, The8 & DK) · Hey, You Can Speak English Too (Hosts: Joshua & Vernon; Guests: Jeonghan & Dino) · Don't Frown (Host: Mingyu; Guests: Jun, Hoshi & Seungkwan)	June 8, 2022
178	50	"Seventeen Going Radio Show" (Part 2)	S.Coups · Joshua & Vernon · Mingyu	Classy Conversation for a Classy Life (Host: S.Coups; Guests: Wonwoo, Woozi, The8 & DK) · Hey, You Can Speak English Too (Hosts: Joshua & Vernon; Guests: Jeonghan & Dino) · Don't Frown (Host: Mingyu; Guests: Jun, Hoshi & Seungkwan)	June 15, 2022
The members of Seventeen are divided into three groups and pretend to be DJs and guests in three radio shows. In Classy Conversation for a Classy Life, S.Coups and his guests discuss the "worst examples" of behavior that they can reflect on to become better people. In Hey, You Can Speak English Too, Joshua and Vernon teach basic English to their native Korean guests. In Don't Frown, Mingyu and his guests discuss their listeners' problems in life and suggest ways to solve them.
179	51	"Know Thyself" (Part 1)	—	—	June 29, 2022 (Note: Going Seventeen took a one-week break due to internal circumstances.)
Seventeen "retakes" the Myers–Briggs Type Indicator (MBTI) test by letting the members take the test in behalf of other member/s with a different MBTI personality type, thus allowing the member/s being examined to know how they are perceived by their co-members.
180	52	"Know Thyself" (Part 2)	—	—	July 6, 2022
After doing a "retake" of their MBTI test, the members of Seventeen learn more about each of their personalities through the more accurate Temperament and Character Inventory (TCI) test which they took before the start of the filming. Renowned psychologist Dr. Song Hyung-seok gives detailed explanations of the members' TCI test results.
181	53	"Hide n Seek"	Wonwoo	Hot Pack (S.Coups, Jeonghan, Joshua, Jun, Hoshi & Seungkwan) · Not Logical (Woozi, The8, Mingyu, DK, Vernon & Dino)	July 13, 2022
The members of Seventeen divide into two teams and play a hybrid of the scavenger hunt, hide-and-seek and tag games. In each 20-minute round, the team playing defense is given ten minutes to scatter five items around the game area, making sure that the items are in plain sight. As the defense team temporarily exits the game area, the team playing offense enters and is given three minutes to seek for the defense team's items by taking pictures of any object within the game area. Afterwards, the defense team reenters and are given seven minutes to capture members of the offense team. After each round, the offense team submits the final photos of the five items they suspect to belong to the defense team. Result Team "Hot Pack", who finds the most number of opponent items, wins.
182	54	"Wonwoo's Diary" (Part 1)	—	—	July 20, 2022
The members of Seventeen play a skit that tells the story of the people in a fictional village of Sebong 2-ri preparing for the National Singing Contest. Wonwoo plays the titular character Jeon Won-woo, a high school student who documents the various scenes in the village prior the event. Cast: Wonwoo as Jeon Won-woo, an 18-year-old high school student who wants to become a documentary film director; Dino as Pi Cheol-in, a 54-year-old native of Sebong 2-ri; Seungkwan as Pi Doo-baek, a native of Sebong 2-ri and Cheol-in's younger brother; Hoshi as Jo Eul-ho, a 34-year-old newbie trot singer who wants to win in the National Singing Contest; Mingyu as Yeon Ye-in, Eul-ho's 33-year-old manager; Jeonghan and Joshua as Yoon Ni-eun and Jo Gi-yeok, a duo of slothful natives in Sebong 2-ri
183	55	"Wonwoo's Diary" (Part 2)	—	—	July 27, 2022
(cont'd from previous episode) Additional Cast: Jun as Ha Sung-in, a 14-year-old eccentric native of Sebong 2-ri who likes stargazing and is searching for aliens; Woozi, DK and Vernon as Dung Gi-duk, Koong and Duh-ruh-ruh-ruh, three aliens who landed in Sebong 2-ri and are trying to blend among the human villagers; The8 as Yoo Dan-ja, the eldest native of Sebong 2-ri, a 100-year-old master in martial arts
184	56	"Christmas in August II" (Part 1)	Vernon	Door 1 (Jun, Vernon & Dino) · Door 2 (Hoshi, Woozi & Seungkwan) · Door 3 (Joshua, Wonwoo, The8 & Mingyu) · Door 4 (S.Coups, Jeonghan & DK)	August 3, 2022
185	57	"Christmas in August II" (Part 2)	Vernon	Door 1 (Jun, Vernon & Dino) · Door 2 (Hoshi, Woozi & Seungkwan) · Door 3 (Joshua, Wonwoo, The8 & Mingyu) · Door 4 (S.Coups, Jeonghan & DK)	August 10, 2022
Forming four teams, the members of Seventeen play horror-themed video games within three hours while wearing Santa suits. Result Joshua, Wonwoo, The8 and Mingyu finish first, while Jun, Vernon and Dino cannot finish the game by the end of the time limit.
186	58	"Good Offer" (Part 1)	—	—	August 17, 2022
187	59	"Good Offer" (Part 2)	—	—	August 24, 2022
The members of Seventeen participate in an auction with an entrance fee. The member with the highest total assets wins. Result Jeonghan wins.
188	60	"Talk Get-Together" (Part 1)	—	various (Note: The members of Seventeen play ghost leg to decide which teams they will be in for each round.)	August 31, 2022
189	61	"Talk Get-Together" (Part 2)	—	various	September 7, 2022
The members of Seventeen talk freely in teams during a "talk dinner".
190	62	"Bad Clue II" (Part 1)	—	—	September 14, 2022
191	63	"Bad Clue II" (Part 2)	—	—	September 21, 2022
192	64	"Bad Clue II" (Part 3)	—	—	September 28, 2022
—	—	"Going Seventeen Special: I Know & Don't Know" (Part 1)	Jeonghan (Referee)	Team I Know (Lee I Know (Dino), S.Coups, Hoshi, Wonwoo, Seungkwan & Vernon) · Team Don't Know (Kim Don't Know (Mingyu), Joshua, Jun, Woozi, The8 & DK)	December 28, 2022
The members of Seventeen play a comedy skit wherein they act as students in their winter break at "SEVONG Middle School". In the first episode, the psychological test club "Know It All" and marathon club "Let's Go" led by Lee I Know (Dino) and Kim Don't Know (Mingyu) respectively play against each other in shoe-toss and the scarecrow game.
—	—	"Going Seventeen Special: I Know & Don't Know" (Part 2)	Jeonghan (Referee)	Team I Know (Lee I Know (Dino), S.Coups, Hoshi, Wonwoo, Seungkwan & Vernon) · Team Don't Know (Kim Don't Know (Mingyu), Joshua, Jun, Woozi, The8 & DK)	January 4, 2023
(cont'd from previous episode) In the second episode, the two clubs battle against each other in a variant of baseball and a hilarious, highly-modified play of dodgeball.

==== Part 3 (March 2023–May 2024) ====
No. overall	No. in season	Title	Host	Teams	Original release date
193	65	"Going Company Outing"	—	—	March 1, 2023
194	66	"Surprise Don't Lie" (Part 1)	—	Citizens Jeonghan [as Doctor], Joshua, Jun, Hoshi [as Thief], Wonwoo, The8, DK, Seungkwan [as Police], Vernon & Dino Mafia S.Coups, Woozi & Mingyu	March 8, 2023
195	67	"Surprise Don't Lie" (Part 2)	—	Citizens Jeonghan [as Doctor], Joshua, Jun, Hoshi [as Thief], Wonwoo, The8, DK, Seungkwan [as Police], Vernon & Dino Mafia S.Coups, Woozi & Mingyu	March 15, 2023
196	68	"Don't Lie : CLUE" (Part 1)	—	Citizens S.Coups, Jeonghan, Joshua, Jun, Hoshi, Woozi, The8, Mingyu [as Doctor], DK [as Police] & Seungkwan Mafia Wonwoo, Vernon & Dino [as Murderer]	March 22, 2023
197	69	"Don't Lie : CLUE" (Part 2)	—	Citizens S.Coups, Jeonghan, Joshua, Jun, Hoshi, Woozi, The8, Mingyu [as Doctor], DK [as Police] & Seungkwan Mafia Wonwoo, Vernon & Dino [as Murderer]	March 29, 2023
198	70	"Don’t Lie : The CHASER" (Part 1)	—	Citizens S.Coups, Jeonghan, Joshua [as Police], Jun, Hoshi, Woozi, Mingyu, Seungkwan [as Doctor], Vernon & Dino Mafia Wonwoo, The8 & DK	April 5, 2023
199	71	"Don’t Lie : The CHASER" (Part 2)	—	Citizens S.Coups, Jeonghan, Joshua [as Police], Jun, Hoshi, Woozi, Mingyu, Seungkwan [as Doctor], Vernon & Dino Mafia Wonwoo, The8 & DK	April 12, 2023
200	72	"Court : Eyes That See The Truth" (Part 1)	Vernon (Judge)	Defendants (S.Coups & Hoshi) · Prosecutors (all other members of Seventeen except Vernon)	April 19, 2023
Sequel of "Surprise Don't Lie" episodes: S.Coups and Hoshi were accused of revealing their roles and the theme of the episodes to other members. A trial was held in court to give penalty to them.
201	73	"Court : Eyes That See The Truth" (Part 2)	Vernon (Judge)	Defendants (S.Coups, Jeonghan, Joshua, Jun, Hoshi & Seungkwan) · Prosecutors (Woozi, The8, Mingyu, DK & Dino) · Witness (Wonwoo)	April 26, 2023
Sequel of "Hide and Seek" episode: Team Hot Pack were accused of cheating by posting photos in prison. S.Coups, Jeonghan, Joshua, Jun, Hoshi and Seungkwan were sentenced to the Point of Omniscient Interfere Penalty. The court also set up laws regarding cheating and rule-breaking.
202	74	"Finding KSY" (Part 1)	—	Hoshi · Team Seungkwan (Joshua, Jun, Seungkwan & Dino) · Team Mingyu (S.Coups, Mingyu, Woozi & Vernon) · Team Jeonghan (Jeonghan, Wonwoo, The8 & DK)	May 3, 2023
203	75	"Finding KSY" (Part 2)	—	Hoshi · Team Seungkwan (Joshua, Jun, Seungkwan & Dino) · Team Mingyu (S.Coups, Mingyu, Woozi & Vernon) · Team Jeonghan (Jeonghan, Wonwoo, The8 & DK)	May 10, 2023
204	76	"A Company Dinner for EveryWON"	—	—	May 17, 2023
Summary (with spoiler) After Wonwoo won the latest Don't Lie series, he held a company dinner for the members and staff to thank their hard work.
205	77	"Everything Possible in the White Zone" (Part 1)	—	—	May 24, 2023
206	78	"Everything Possible in the White Zone" (Part 2)	—	—	May 31, 2023
The original plan could not be carried out due to the rainy weather. Instead, the members were given a list of games to play in the White Zone.
207	79	"GOING Vol.2" (Part 1)	—	—	June 7, 2023
208	80	"GOING Vol.2" (Part 2)	—	—	June 14, 2023
209	81	"TOUR SEV SEV" (Part 1)	—	Leisure Team (S.Coups, Jeonghan & Jun) · Scenery Tour (Wonwoo, Woozi, Seungkwan & Vernon) · Food Tour (The8, Mingyu & Dino)	June 22, 2023
210	82	"TOUR SEV SEV : Gullibles’ Travels"	—	S.Coups, Jeonghan, Joshua & Jun	June 28, 2023
211	83	"TOUR SEV SEV: Sentimental Short-form Tour"	—	Hoshi, Wonwoo, Woozi & Vernon	July 5, 2023
212	84	"TOUR SEV SEV : To eat or not to eat"	—	The8, Mingyu, DK & Dino	July 12, 2023
213	85	"BOOmily Outing" (Part 1)	Seungkwan	Team Seok (Joshua, DK & Vernon) · Team Woo (Jeonghan, Hoshi, Wonwoo & Woozi) · Team Di (S.Coups, Mingyu & Dino)	July 19, 2023
Seungkwan's old variety show series returned after 2 years. Jun and The8 acted as the owners of a village house and asked the members to perform some chores while they were away. In the first episode of BOOmily Outing, the members divided into teams by playing the strawberry game. The three teams then picked up strawberries wearing a cone. Based on the weight of the strawberries collected by each team, they rested, prepared ingredients or did grocery shopping.
214	86	"BOOmily Outing" (Part 2)	Seungkwan	—	July 26, 2023
215	87	"BOOmily Outing" (Part 3)	Seungkwan	—	August 2, 2023
216	88	"BOOmily Outing" (Part 4)	Seungkwan	—	August 9, 2023
217	89	"The Guest Who Left Secretly" (Part 1)	—	—	August 16, 2023
218	90	"The Guest Who Left Secretly" (Part 2)	—	—	August 23, 2023
219	91	"Point of Omniscient Interfere Penalty" (Part 1)	Wonwoo (Mediator)	Hot Pack (S.Coups, Jeonghan, Joshua, Jun & Hoshi (Note: Seungkwan also belonged to team Hot Pack but he did not participate in this episode.)) · Not Logical (Woozi, The8, Mingyu, DK, Vernon & Dino)	August 30, 2023
As a punishment for violating the game rules in "Hide n Seek" (also see "Court : Eyes That See The Truth"), S.Coups, Jeonghan, Joshua, Jun and Hoshi have to collect 100 grape stickers each by satisfying requests of other members.
220	92	"Point of Omniscient Interfere Penalty" (Part 2)	Wonwoo (Mediator)	Hot Pack (S.Coups, Jeonghan, Joshua, Jun & Hoshi) · Not Logical (Woozi, The8, Mingyu, DK, Vernon & Dino)	September 6, 2023
Continuing from the last episode, members who collect 100 grape stickers can now make requests and give out grape stickers. Members who fail to collect 100 grape stickers have to tidy up the venue afterwards.
221	93	"Rock Scissors Paper" (Part 1)	—	Hand and Chips (S.Coups, Jeonghan, DK & Dino) · Yeah (Joshua, Jun, Wonwoo & The8) · Muksabal (Hoshi, Woozi, Mingyu & Vernon)	September 13, 2023
222	94	"Rock Scissors Paper" (Part 2)	—	Hand and Chips (S.Coups, Jeonghan, DK & Dino) · Yeah (Joshua, Jun, Wonwoo & The8) · Muksabal (Hoshi, Woozi, Mingyu & Vernon)	September 20, 2023
—	—	"Comeback Special: God of Light Music" (Part 1)	—	—	October 18, 2023
—	—	"Comeback Special: God of Light Music" (Part 2)	—	—	October 25, 2023
223	95	"Grudge" (Part 1) (Note: The episode, introduced as the second chapter of the "Going Original Series", may contain frightening imagery. Viewer discretion is advised.)	—	1st Group (Jeonghan, Joshua & The8) · 2nd Group (Hoshi & Dino)	November 1, 2023
224	96	"Grudge" (Part 2)	—	3rd Group (Woozi, Mingyu & Vernon) · 4th Group (Wonwoo & Seungkwan)	November 8, 2023
225	97	"2023 Best of GOING SEVENTEEN" (Part 1)	—	—	November 15, 2023
226	98	"2023 Best of GOING SEVENTEEN" (Part 2)	—	—	November 22, 2023
—	—	"Going Seventeen Special: ETC"	Various	Joshua, Wonwoo, The8, Mingyu, DK & Seungkwan · Jun, Hoshi, Woozi, Vernon & Dino (for Tease Your Heart Out only)	March 13, 2024
This episode is made up of a collection of shorter video clips, including the following: Bunny Bunny Update Update (hosted by Seungkwan): The members provided an update regarding their recent activities; Tease Your Heart Out (hosted by Jun): The members played Alkkagi while teasing the opposing team; I Want To See You Do This (hosted by The8): The members first wrote down what they wanted the others to do in the new year. They then played a game of hats to determine the person who would perform the specified action; But (hosted by Mingyu): The members had a debate of whether it was better to live as Seungkwan or Dino; and; Zone Out (no host): The members tried to stay calm while watching a video of sheep and random people jumping over a fence.; Result Wonwoo lost. He would go skydiving, as suggested by The8.
—	—	"Going Seventeen Special: ETC"	Various	The8 VS Vernon · Hoshi VS Mingyu · Joshua VS DK (for Get Out only)	March 20, 2024
This episode is made up of another collection of shorter video clips, including the following: DINO Name Change to Pi Cheolin? (no host): The members and staff played a hidden camera prank on Dino. They tried to persuade him to change his stage name to Pi Cheolin.; Delivery Food Fighter (hosted by Woozi): The members tried foreign food while only telling lies about the origins of the food. The format was the same as that of Episodes 14-15 in Going Seventeen 2020.; The Gourmet Solitude (no host): Wonwoo tried fried chicken, which was served by Dino and DK, while other members acted as the inner voices of Wonwoo.; Get Out (hosted by DK): The members tried to eat potato chips in pairs without exceeding a noise level of 60dB. Otherwise, they will be hit by the other member with a toy hammer.; Detective VERNON (hosted by Vernon): Vernon tried to guess which member poked him in the neck.; Cheers to a New Year (hosted by Joshua): The members made concluding remarks for the episode.; Result Vernon succeeded in 4 guesses. The culprit was The8.
—	—	"Comeback Special: The Musical Heirs" (Part 1)	—	—	April 24, 2024
—	—	"Comeback Special: The Musical Heirs" (Part 2)	—	—	May 1, 2024
As part of the promotion of their new compilation album 17 Is Right Here, the members of Seventeen play a skit wherein they act as students at "SEVONG Arts High School". Maestro (played by DK) joins the school as a music teacher and recruits members for his orchestra.

==== Part 4 (May 2024–June 2025) ====
No. overall	No. in season	Title	Host	Teams	Original release date
227	99	"Going Rangers" (Part 1)	—	Dr. Woo (Woozi) · Team 1 (S.Coups, Joshua, Wonwoo, The8, DK & Dino) · Team 2 (Jeonghan, Jun, Hoshi, Mingyu, Seungkwan & Vernon)	May 15, 2024
228	100	"Going Rangers" (Part 2)	—	Dr. Woo (Woozi) · Team 1 (S.Coups, Joshua, Wonwoo, The8, DK & Dino) · Team 2 (Jeonghan, Jun, Hoshi, Mingyu, Seungkwan & Vernon)	May 22, 2024
The members played various hilarious games to avoid being included in the final lineup of Going Rangers. Result The final lineup included S.Coups, Jeonghan, Wonwoo, Mingyu, DK and Seungkwan.
229	101	"13 Angry Men" (Part 1)	Jeonghan	—	May 29, 2024
The members debated whether killing Pinocchio should be considered an act of murder or vandalism.
230	102	"13 Angry Men" (Part 2)	Jeonghan	—	June 5, 2024
The members debated (1) whether happiness you are not aware of at the moment count as happiness and (2) whether good intentions can exonerate one from bad outcomes.
231	103	"Liar Liar" (Part 1)	Woozi	—	June 12, 2024
232	104	"Liar Liar" (Part 2)	Woozi	—	June 19, 2024
The members participated in a special quiz show at which they had to deceive others to gain an advantage. Result Jeonghan won.
233	105	"Insomnia-Zero III" (Part 1)	Hoshi	—	June 26, 2024
234	106	"Insomnia-Zero III" (Part 2)	Hoshi	—	July 3, 2024
In the 3rd installment of "Insomnia-Zero", the members of Seventeen once again took on the challenge of maintaining a stable heart rate while lying down for three minutes. In each round, the three members with the most stable heart rate can go home while losers proceeded to the next round and repeated the challenge. While a member closed his eyes, his fellow members distracted him by gossiping (round 1), answering questions from carats (their fans) on his behalf (round 2), and letting him listen to their honest confessions through earphones (round 3). Result For the third time in a row, Woozi lost the challenge and had to try falling asleep at the end of the episode after all members left.
235	107	"Class President Election" (Part 1)	—	—	July 10, 2024
236	108	"Class President Election" (Part 2)	—	—	July 17, 2024
An election was held to decide the class president of Going Seventeen. Result Mingyu was elected as class president.
237	109	"Grrreuk kak kak TTT" (Part 1)	—	—	July 25, 2024
238	110	"Grrreuk kak kak TTT" (Part 2)	—	—	July 31, 2024
239	111	"Grrreuk kak kak TTT" (Part 3)	—	—	August 7, 2024
In Going Seventeen's fifth "TTT", Seventeen enjoyed the company of each other in another unscripted MT done in Pocheon.
240	112	"Trap" (Part 1)	—	—	September 4, 2024 (Note: Going Seventeen took a three-week summer break.)
241	113	"Trap" (Part 2)	—	—	September 11, 2024
The members tried to escape from an abandoned hospital that was occupied by zombies.
242	114	"Boss" (Part 1)	—	Team Yellow (Wonwoo, The8 & Vernon) · Team Red (Joshua, Seungkwan & Dino) · Team Blue (S.Coups, Jeonghan, Jun & Mingyu) · Team Green (Hoshi, Woozi & DK)	September 18, 2024
243	115	"Boss" (Part 2)	—	Team Yellow (Wonwoo, The8 & Vernon) · Team Red (Joshua, Seungkwan & Dino) · Team Blue (S.Coups, Jeonghan, Jun & Mingyu) · Team Green (Hoshi, Woozi & DK)	September 25, 2024
The members played a modified version of the board game I'm the Boss!. Result Jeonghan won.
—	—	"Comeback Special: CHOI & BOO's Very Good Morning" (Part 1) (Note: S.Coups did not participate in this episode despite the name.)	Seungkwan	—	October 9, 2024 (Note: Going Seventeen took a one-week break.)
In the first part of the show, the host Seungkwan introduced the panelists and guests who were played by other members of Seventeen. Panelists: (Fixed panelist) Hoshi as Jo Eul-ho, (Note: Jo Eul-ho first appeared in Wonwoo's Diary (Part 1), an earlier episode of Going Seventeen.) a trot singer; (Fixed panelist) Mingyu as Pyo Soo-yong, a profiler; (Special guest) Wonwoo as himself, a member of Seventeen; (Special guest) Vernon as Chwe Han-sol, a professional audience member; Guests: Woozi as Heo Eo-jun, a 54-year-old holistic therapy expert; Dino as Jung Soon-gu, a 40-year-old laughter therapist; The8 as Kim Dan-bi, a 63-year-old beekeeper; Joshua as Aiden Hong, a 29-year-old sold-out show host; DK as Jang Ppoong, a 30-year-old energy blast master
—	—	"Comeback Special: CHOI & BOO's Very Good Morning" (Part 2)	Seungkwan	—	October 16, 2024
(cont'd from previous episode) In the second part of the show, the panelists had to identify the guest who faked his identity. Result Kim Dan-bi, who was played by The8, turned out to be the father of a producer of the show.
244	116	"We Have to Cross Over in a Day? Are You Being Serious Right Now?!" (Part 1)	—	Team The8 (S.Coups, Hoshi, Wonwoo, Woozi, The8 & Vernon) · Team Dino (Jeonghan, Joshua, Mingyu, DK, Seungkwan & Dino)	October 23, 2024
245	117	"We Have to Cross Over in a Day? Are You Being Serious Right Now?!" (Part 2)	—	Team The8 (S.Coups, Hoshi, Wonwoo, Woozi, The8 & Vernon) · Team Dino (Jeonghan, Joshua, Mingyu, DK, Seungkwan & Dino)	October 30, 2024
The members attempted to cross a wave pool using their self-made boats. Result Team Dino succeeded but Team The8 failed.
246	118	"Going Production: Don't Laugh"	—	S.Coups, Jeonghan, Joshua, Hoshi, Seungkwan & Dino	November 6, 2024
In this short episode, the members tried making one another laugh.
246	118	"Going Production: Interview With The Zombie"	—	Wonwoo, Woozi, The8, Mingyu, DK & Vernon	November 6, 2024
In this short episode, the members played table tennis while they were pretending to be zombies.
247	119	"Going Production"	—	S.Coups, Jeonghan, Joshua, Hoshi, Seungkwan & Dino · Wonwoo, Woozi, The8, Mingyu, DK & Vernon	November 13, 2024
The members attempted to produce 7-minute content. This episode contained the behind-the-scenes of the previous episode.
248	120	"GOING Millionaire" (Part 1) (Note: This episode's title and concept allude to the game show Who Wants to Be a Millionaire?)	Kim Jaehyung (External Host)	Team Wen Junhui Special Forces (Jun, Woozi, Mingyu, Vernon & Dino) · Team GoZzang (Note: The team name "GoZzang" is an abbreviation for "Going Seventeen is the best". Zzang (짱) means awesome.) (Joshua, Hoshi, Wonwoo, The8 & DK)	November 20, 2024
249	121	"GOING Millionaire" (Part 2)	Kim Jaehyung (External Host)	Team Wen Junhui Special Forces (Jun, Woozi, Mingyu, Vernon & Dino) · Team GoZzang (Joshua, Hoshi, Wonwoo, The8 & DK)	November 27, 2024
The members split into two teams and competed against each other by answering questions related to Going Seventeen. Result Team Wen Junhui Special Forces won.
250	122	"SEVONG Elementary School" (Part 1)	—	—	December 4, 2024
In this school special, the members of Seventeen played a comedy skit wherein they acted as students of "SEVONG Elementary School". They became friends and engaged in different activities. The first two class activities were "Secret friends" and "Human Bingo".
251	123	"SEVONG Elementary School" (Part 2)	—	—	December 11, 2024
(cont'd from previous episode) The members of Seventeen played the "Vampire game", which was the last class activity, followed by sports activities "Wall dodgeball" and "A raccoon, look".
—	—	"Comeback Special: Seventeen TV" (Part 1)	—	—	May 21, 2025
—	—	"Comeback Special: Seventeen TV" (Part 2)	—	—	May 28, 2025
—	—	"Comeback Special: Seventeen TV Behind"	—	—	June 4, 2025
To celebrate their 10th anniversary and release of their fifth album Happy Burstday, the members of Seventeen prepared a fake documentary of the team facing a crisis of team rebranding.

==== Part 5 (June 2025–December 2025) ====
No. overall	No. in season	Title	Host	Teams	Original release date
252	124	"Where's Seventeen?" (Part 1)	—	Dino · All other members of Seventeen (Note: Jeonghan and Jun were absent.)	June 25, 2025
253	125	"Where's Seventeen?" (Part 2)	—	Dino · All other members of Seventeen	July 2, 2025
Dino had to identify all other members of Seventeen from a crowd who wore cloaks in two rounds. Result Dino failed the mission. He can only identify S.Coups, Joshua, Hoshi and Mingyu in the first round. He further identified Wonwoo, DK and Seungkwan in the second round but still failed to identify Woozi, The8 and Vernon.
254	126	"The Rebellion of the Moles" (Part 1)	—	Team Human Joshua, Woozi, Mingyu & Seungkwan Team Mole S.Coups, Jun, Hoshi, The8, DK, Vernon & Dino	July 9, 2025
255	127	"The Rebellion of the Moles" (Part 2)	—	Team Human S.Coups [spy mole], Joshua, Hoshi [captured mole], Woozi & Mingyu Team Mole Jun, The8, DK, Seungkwan [pet human], Vernon & Dino	July 16, 2025
In a battle between the humans and moles, the moles must move all objects from the human house to the mole house within four rounds. During the second round, the moles discovered that there was a spy hidden among them. Result Team Human won with the help of S.Coups, the spy mole.
256	128	"MC BOO's Dangerous Invitation" (Part 1)	Seungkwan	—	July 23, 2025
257	129	"MC BOO's Dangerous Invitation" (Part 2)	Seungkwan	—	July 30, 2025
In the latest episode of Seungkwan's old variety show series, the members of Seventeen played the "Flying chair game" from the 2002–2003 KBS variety show Dangerous Invitation. (Note: Korean title: 위험한 초대; RR: Wiheomhan chodae, lit. "Dangerous invitation")
258	130	"Water Battlegrounds" (Part 1) (Note: This episode's title and concept allude to the video game PUBG: Battlegrounds)	—	—	August 6, 2025
259	131	"Water Battlegrounds" (Part 2)	—	—	August 13, 2025
The members took part in a real-life battle royale game. The last surviving member would be the winner. The member with the most steps logged would be crowned MVP. Result Mingyu was the winner. DK was crowned MVP, and he became the second class president because of that.
260	132	"None Of This Is True: Our Connection" (Part 1)	Woozi & Seungkwan	—	August 20, 2025
261	133	"None Of This Is True: Our Connection" (Part 2)	Woozi & Seungkwan	—	August 27, 2025
In these two episodes in which everything was made up, the members tried recovering lost connections.
262	134	"The Gejang" (Part 1)	—	—	September 3, 2025
263	135	"The Gejang" (Part 2)	—	—	September 10, 2025
The members tried identifying the gejang dishes made by Seungkwan's mother and Dino's grandmother.
264	136	"Seventeen, How The Pack Rests" (Part 1)	—	—	September 17, 2025
265	137	"Seventeen, How The Pack Rests" (Part 2)	—	—	September 24, 2025
These two episodes are an observational documentary of Seventeen resting near a valley.
266	138	"Good Offer 2" (Part 1)	—	—	October 1, 2025
267	139	"Good Offer 2" (Part 2)	—	—	October 8, 2025
In the 2nd installment of "Good Offer", the members of Seventeen once again participated in an auction with an entrance fee. Unlike the first season, the market values of art pieces might fluctuate and the members were allowed to resell these art pieces. Each member also received a secret piece of information. The member with the highest total assets won. Result Seungkwan won. Dino was crowned MVP.
268	140	"Boo Seungkwan and Ball Sports" (Part 1) (Note: This episode's concept alludes to the Japanese anime Haikyu!!)	—	Seungkwan · All other members of Seventeen	October 15, 2025
269	141	"Boo Seungkwan and Ball Sports" (Part 2)	—	Seungkwan · All other members of Seventeen	October 22, 2025
In the setting of Bibigo High School, Seungkwan competed against the other members of Seventeen in various ball sports. Result Seungkwan won.
270	142	"Innocent Until Proven Guilty" (Part 1)	Jung Jaemin (External Judge)	Defendant (S.Coups) & Lawyers (Jun, Hoshi, The8, Mingyu & Seungkwan) · Prosecutors (Joshua, Woozi, Vernon & Dino) · Witness (DK)	October 29, 2025
271	143	"Innocent Until Proven Guilty" (Part 2)	Jung Jaemin (External Judge)	Defendant (S.Coups) & Lawyers (Jun, Hoshi, The8, Mingyu & Seungkwan) · Prosecutors (Joshua, Woozi, Vernon & Dino) · Witness (DK)	November 5, 2025
In a fictional court case, S.Coups, who played the role of a model prisoner, was accused of murdering a physician by acute drug intoxication. Result The defendant was acquitted, although he was responsible for the murder.
272	144	"Let's Go Home" (Part 1)	—	Team Black (S.Coups, Joshua, Woozi, The8, Seungkwan, Vernon) · Team White (Jun, Hoshi, Mingyu, DK, Dino)	November 12, 2025
273	145	"Let's Go Home" (Part 2)	—	various	November 19, 2025
The members and staff split into Team Black and Team White and played games. The winning team can go home, and the remaining members will split into new teams and play new games until there is one member left. Result Jun was the last member to leave.
274	146	"Chat, Chat" (Part 1)	—	—	November 26, 2025
275	147	"Chat, Chat" (Part 2)	—	—	December 3, 2025
The members talked freely in their own podcast.
276	148	"Mafiapoly" (Part 1) (Note: This episode's title and concept allude to the board game Monopoly)	—	Citizens S.Coups, Joshua [as Golden Bat], The8, Mingyu, DK, Seungkwan & Vernon Mafia Jun & Dino	December 10, 2025
277	149	"Mafiapoly" (Part 2)	—	Citizens S.Coups, Joshua [as Golden Bat], The8, Mingyu, DK, Seungkwan & Vernon Mafia Jun & Dino	December 17, 2025
The members played a board game that was a combination of Mafia and Monopoly. The citizens had to catch all the Mafia while buying land, and they had to avoid being misled by the Golden Bat. Result The Mafia and Golden Bat won.

==== Part 6 (July 2026–present) ====
No. overall	No. in season	Title	Host	Teams	Original release date
278	150	"Digging Clams and Making Bets" (Part 1)	—	—	July 8, 2026
279	151	"Digging Clams and Making Bets" (Part 2)	—	—	July 15, 2026
The members dug clams while being challenged every 10 minutes with bets that they had to win to leave the mudflat.
280	152	"No Rules" (Part 1)	—	—	July 22, 2026
281	153	"No Rules" (Part 2)	—	—	July 29, 2026
The members acted as prisoners. They had to avoid being the final owners of the three hidden spoons to avoid the penalty. Result Joshua, Seungkwan and Dino were the final owners of the three spoons. They had to receive a penalty in a later episode.
282	154	"Red Ball" (Part 1) (Note: This episode's title and concept allude to the game show Golden Balls)	—	various	August 5, 2026
283	155	"Red Ball" (Part 2)	—	Joshua & Seungkwan · Mingyu, DK & Dino · Jun, The8 & Vernon	August 12, 2026
The members played a psychological game where they must choose either a red ball or blue ball in each round. Based on their choices, they would split the money, take all the money or get no money. Result All members were eliminated and lost all the money earned in the previous rounds.
284	156	"Ad-lib: High Society" (Part 1)	The8	—	August 19, 2026
285	157	"Ad-lib: High Society" (Part 2)	The8	—	August 26, 2026
The members played a skit wherein they acted as the guests of a party for aristocrats while being interrupted from time to time by an EMS massager attached to each of them.
286	158	"21" (Part 1)	—	Team A (Joshua, DK, Vernon) · Team B (S.Coups, The8, Seungkwan) · Team C (Jun, Mingyu, Dino)	September 2, 2026
287	159	"21" (Part 2)	—	Team A (Joshua, DK, Vernon) · Team B (S.Coups, The8, Seungkwan) · Team C (Jun, Mingyu, Dino)	September 9, 2026
The members played a game that combined blackjack and a chase. Instead of drawing cards, the players had to catch the runners carrying the cards. Result Team A won.
288	160	"Happiness in 12,317 won" (Part 1)	—	—	September 16, 2026
289	161	"Happiness in 12,317 won" (Part 2)	—	—	September 23, 2026
290	162	"What Happened On The Set: Don't Lie" (Part 1)	—	various	September 30, 2026
291	163	"What Happened On The Set: Don't Lie" (Part 2)	—	various	October 7, 2026

== Related ==
A related show is Going BooSeokSoon. This show features DK, Hoshi and Seungkwan, the three members of the sub-unit BooSeokSoon. This show only has two episodes.

No. overall	No. in season	Title	Original release date
—	—	"Comeback Time" (Part 1)	February 1, 2023
—	—	"Comeback Time" (Part 2)	February 8, 2023
BooSeokSoon play a skit wherein they perform various activities for their comeback. They are joined by Woozi and Dino who make a special appearance in the first and second episode respectively.

Another related show is Going DxS. This show features DK and Seungkwan, the members of the sub-unit DK X Seungkwan. This show only has two episodes.

No. overall	No. in season	Title	Original release date
—	—	"Villains BBOODO" (Part 1)	January 7, 2026
—	—	"Villains BBOODO" (Part 2)	January 14, 2026
DK and Seungkwan form a villain duo to destroy the world's music.

== Soundtrack ==
The soundtrack of Going Seventeen includes the show's opening and ending theme songs which are both composed by Seventeen band members Woozi, Jeonghan, Hoshi, DK and Seungkwan. Both are performed by the entire band and debuted on 17 June 2019 in the eighth episode of Going Seventeen 2019.

The production of the opening theme song (and its corresponding title sequence for the season) and the ending theme song were documented and featured in the sixth and seventh episodes of Going Seventeen 2019. In Episode 6: "Making the Going Seventeen Opening Song" (aired 20 May 2019), it was revealed that Woozi pre-produced four instrumentals and let his co-composers choose which among them will be fitting to be the opening and ending theme music. The composers then wrote the lyrics and recorded demo versions of the songs, with Woozi handling the production. Later, the entire band unanimously approved the songs and discussed the production of the songs' final versions and the filming of the show's title sequence. The behind-the-scenes of the recording of the songs and the filming of the title sequence are featured in Episode 7: "Making the Going Seventeen Opening Video" (aired 3 June 2019).

== Reception ==
=== Television ===
On April 1, 2021, South Korean cable television network JTBC announced a 10-week long Spring special programming block of content from Hybe Labels artists. Going Seventeen was included in the lineup for Seventeen. In addition, two new episodes from the series, 'Treasure Island: 13 Raiders', premiered on television first, and later on YouTube and Weverse.

Title	Channel	Air Date	Ref.
Don't Lie II (Part 1)	JTBC2	May 13, 2021	
Don't Lie II (Part 2)	JTBC2	May 20, 2021	
Treasure Island: 13 Raiders (Part 1)	JTBC2	May 27, 2021	
Treasure Island: 13 Raiders (Part 2)	JTBC2	June 3, 2021	
Insomnia-Zero (Parts 1 & 2)	JTBC4	June 6, 2021	

=== Accolades ===
Going Seventeen has been praised for being content that can be enjoyed by anyone regardless of generation, nationality, and fandom. It breaks the notion of 'K-pop content enjoyed only by fans' and is expanding the audience enough to build a fandom of its own. The show has often been labeled 'National Web Variety Show' and even 'K-pop's Infinite Challenge' by various media outlets.

As of January 2022, Going Seventeen surpassed 270 million cumulative views with just two seasons in 2020 and 2021, and averaged over 3.62 million and 2.44 million views per episode, respectively.

== Notes ==
SEVENTEEN+CARATS=♥️
