= PC bang =

Type of LAN gaming center in South Korea

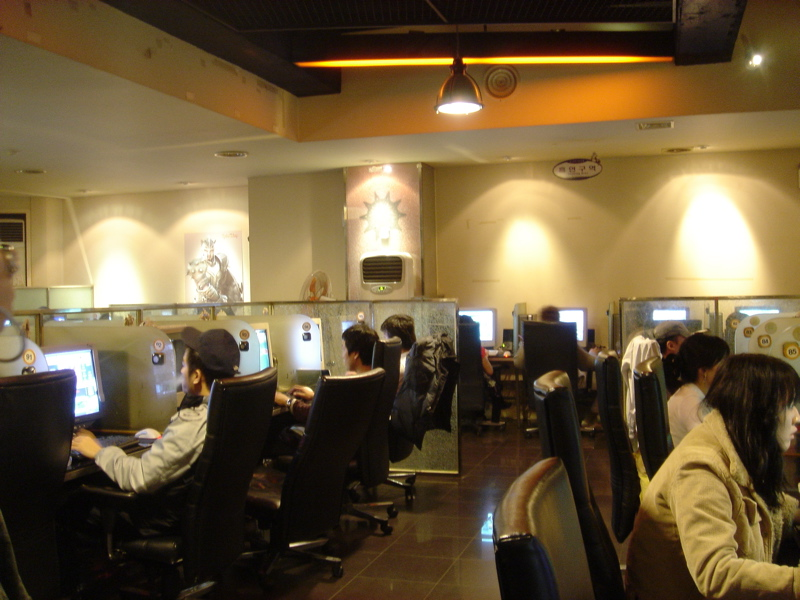
- A PC bang in 2006

PC bang
- Hangul: PC방; 피시방; 피씨방 (Note: "PC방" is the usual transcription in South Korea. "피시방" and "피씨방" are transcription of exclusive use of Hangul. The former corresponds to South Korean standard orthography for writing loan words (외래어 표기법), but many South Koreans wrote as the latter when using Hangul exclusively.)
- Hanja: PC房; 피시房; 피씨房
- RR: PCbang; pisibang; pissibang
- MR: PCpang; p'isibang; p'issibang

A PC bang (Korean: PC방; lit. 'PC room') is a type of internet cafe or LAN gaming center in South Korea. Patrons can use computers, often to play video games in person with friends, for an hourly fee.

Although the per capita penetration of personal computers and broadband internet access in South Korea is one of the highest in the world, PC bangs remain popular as they provide a social meeting place for gamers (especially school-aged gamers) to play together with their peers. Aside from the social aspect, PC bangs' ability to offer access to expensive and powerful high-end personal computers (better known as gaming PCs), designed specifically for video gaming, at a comparatively low price has also bolstered their popularity.

== History ==
The origin of PC bang starts with '전자카페' ('Jeonja Kape', which literally translates to 'Electronic Cafe') in South Korea opened in March 1988, which was then closed in 1991. The original creators of the '전자카페,' Ahn Sang-soo (Professor of Hongik University) and Gum Nu-ri (Professor of Kookmin University), launched this electronic cafe next to Hongik University.

At the time, people were able to use two 16-bit computers, which were connected by a telephone line. However, it was only known to locals and not widely known, yet.

== Industry ==
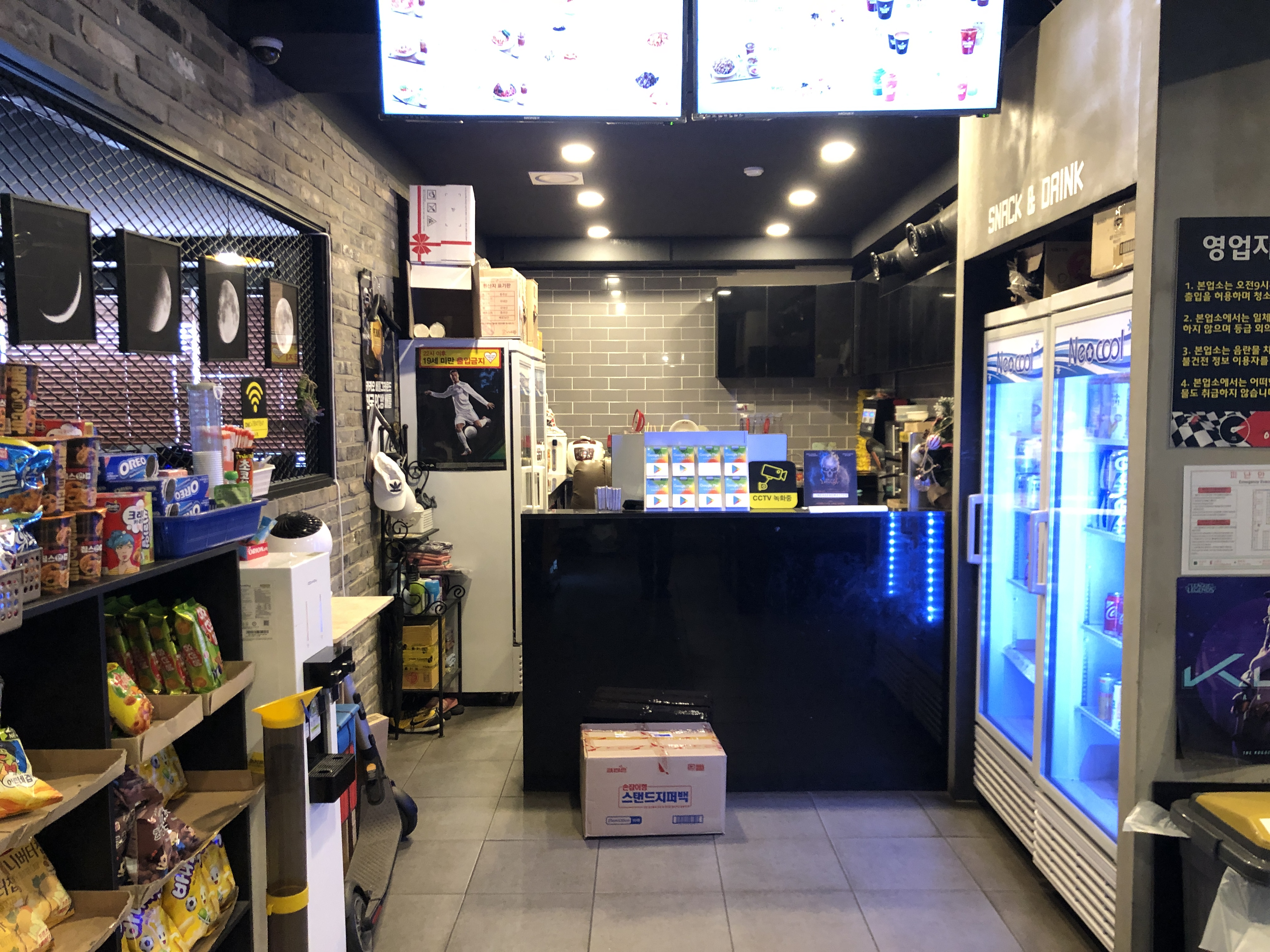
Food and drink sold in a PC bang (2020)

The most played games in PC bangs are known as massively multiplayer online role-playing games, in which more than 100,000 people around the globe can play at the same time. PC bangs rose to popularity following the release of the PC game StarCraft in 1998. At the time, South Korea had a thriving computer industry with Internet use reaching over 50% of the population. As of 2002, 25 million citizens were using the Internet, and 14.4 million Korean homes were equipped with Internet access. Accompanying this high rate of home Internet access, it is estimated the number of PC bangs grew from 100 to 25,000 between 1997 and 2011. Many popular South Korean multiplayer games provide players with incentives which encourage them to play from a PC bang. For example, the Nexon games Kart Rider and BnB reward players with bonus "Lucci" — the games' virtual currencies—when they log on from a PC bang.

== Demographics ==
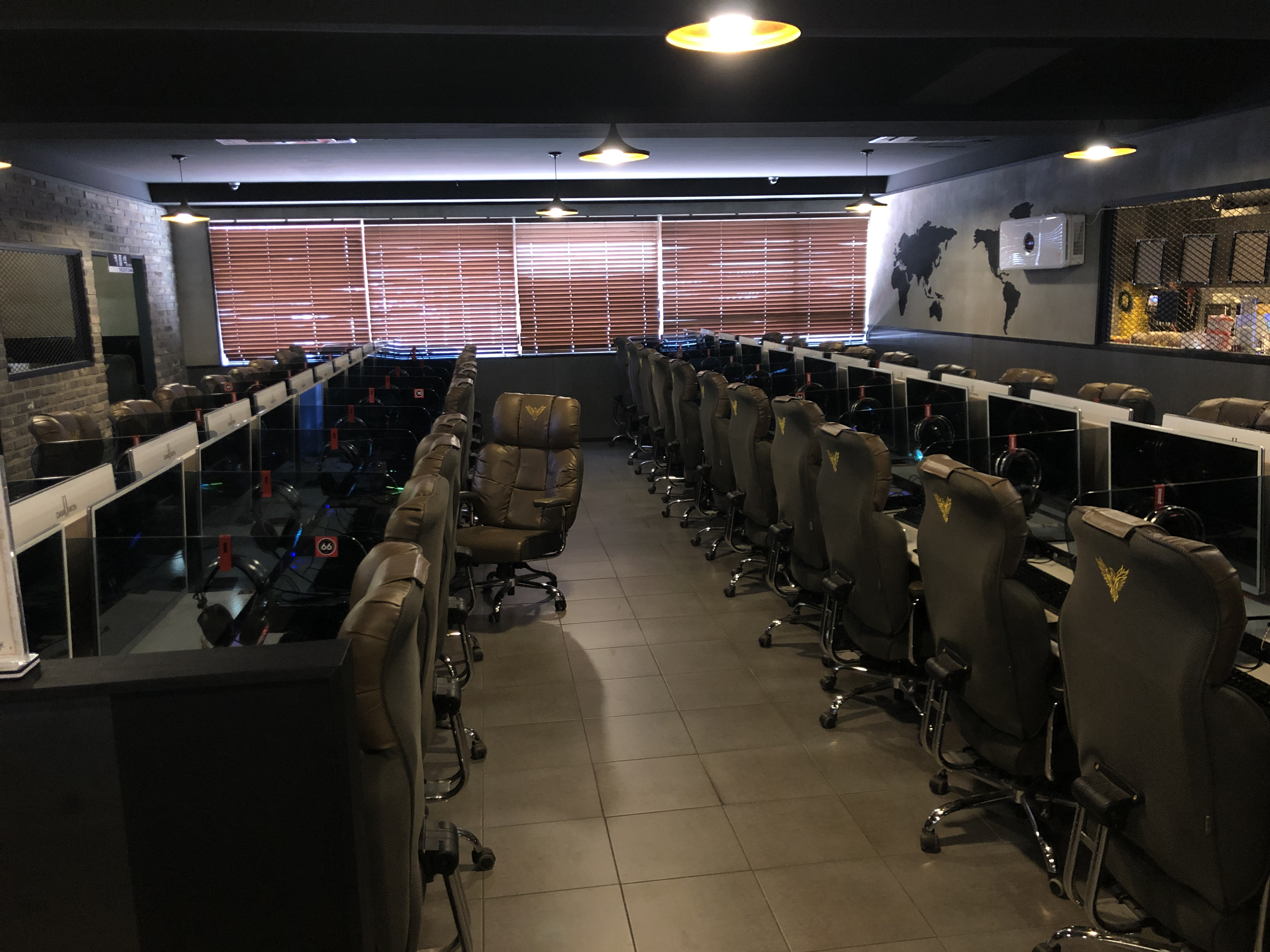
A PC bang (2020)

Although PC bangs are used by all ages and genders, they are most popular with male gamers in their teens and twenties. Throughout the day, the demographics of the PC room change. Most PC rooms are open 24 hours. In the mornings, the primary type of user is an adult male, between 30 and 50. During the afternoons, young males come in groups between 1-3 pm. During this time is when PC bangs are the noisiest. Around dinner time, teenagers and young adults come in. They usually play online card games, arcade games, or MMORPGs. Competitive game players (ages 18 and up) start coming in at 8pm and usually stay for several hours or all night. League of Legends, Lineage II, Sudden Attack and StarCraft are the most popular games for late-night players.

== Social aspect ==
The PC bang industry has created a culture that is participated in by most youth in South Korea. Gamers have turned the PC bang into a socialization facility, becoming a huge part in the lives of South Korean youths today. Many students have suggested that the PC-Bang provides a stress-free, fun, and youth-dominated environment where groups of friends can meet and engage in a cooperative game. They have suggested that the games themselves may promote a social environment by promoting the development of squads or groups of players to play the game more effectively.

The social aspect also can tie into the local's country support for esports. For example, like in America, you would sit around a TV to watch a major sport like football. As for South Korea, due to their booming success in the E-SPORTS scene they provide the same type of experience by going to a local PC BANG to watch their favorite League of Legends team or Dota team participate in the world or national level events or competitions.

== Addiction ==
With computer and Internet access so readily available to the public, both at home and at PC bangs, gaming addiction has become a concern. The consequences of several hours spent at the PC bang gaming and the strong need to compete cause increased addiction and displacement problems for South Korean PC bang users. The biggest displacements due to addiction include sleep, school, homework, promises to meet with friends, and time spent with friends. As part of its efforts to battle online game addictions among teenagers, South Korea introduced a law in 2011 that prohibits those aged 16 and under from playing online games between midnight and 6 a.m. The law mainly targets PC online games as well as consoles with online features. It allows a two-year grace period for smartphone and tablet PC games before reconsidering if they should be included, as online game addictions on those platforms are not currently considered a serious problem.

== Industry impact ==
South Korean PC bangs have been identified as the source of a large number of players that use software tools to cheat in the video game Overwatch, effectively making play on Asian servers for the game unenjoyable for others. The game's publisher, Blizzard Entertainment has arranged deals with many PC bangs to allow anyone using the site to play Overwatch without purchasing the game as part of the hourly fee. Because of the competitive and youthful nature of the average PC bang user, many of these players use tools like aimbots to gain the upper edge in Overwatch matches so as to show off to friends. While Blizzard does ban accounts from using these types of hacks, PC bang users can quickly make a new Battle.net account and jump back into the game, using the same tools. Blizzard reports handling thousands of such bans a day from South Korea. From February 2017 onward, Blizzard requires South Korean players to log into a Battle.net account in order to play Overwatch and other Blizzard games. As creating a Battle.net account requires unique personal information, including difficult-to-spoof South Korean social security numbers, Blizzard anticipates this will limit the creation of throwaway accounts and alleviate the situation.
