= Production team =

Technical staff who produce a play, television show, music recording or film

A production team is the staff who produce a play, television show, recording, or film. A media production team can be divided into creative staff and technical crew. For example, in a theatrical performance, the production team includes not only the running crew, but also the theatrical producer, designers and theatre direction.

A production company in filmmaking is composed of a film crew and a television crew in video production.

In music, the term production team typically refers to a group of individuals filling the role of "record producer" usually reserved for one individual. Some examples of musical production teams include Matmos and D-Influence.

== See also ==
- Executive producer
- Hip hop production
- Impresario
