= Crazy Arcade =

2001 video game

- Developer: Nexon Corporation
- Publishers: NEXON Korea; Nexon America (North America); Shanda (China); DigiCell (Taiwan) - formerly Gamania (Taiwan); VNG (Vietnam); INNOVA (Russia)
- Designer: Nexon
- Platform: Microsoft Windows
- Release: 16 October 2001
- Genres: Maze, strategy
- Mode: Multiplayer

Crazy Arcade (Korean: 크레이지 아케이드) is a free South Korean online multiplayer game developed by Nexon. It was first published in 2001. It was released in North America as PopTag!.

It has offered up to five different game modes throughout its history: Bomb and Bubbles (BnB), Tetris, Hidden Catch, Dizzy Pang, and Bz, but the latter four were eventually removed from the game. BnB, which takes on the classic Bomberman series, adds its own twist to the game by replacing Bomberman's bombs with water balloons. Crazy Arcade's success spawned a franchise, having been followed by the release of the spin-off games CrazyRacing KartRider, CrazyShooting BubbleFighter, and CrazyRacing AirRider.

== Gameplay ==
Players must kill their opponents by setting water balloons that pop and release water both vertically and horizontally. Being exposed to the water causes characters to become trapped in a bubble. If a teammate makes contact with a trapped player, the player is released from the bubble. If an opponent does the same, however, or if the player does not make any contact within a short period of time, the player dies, which may or may not remove the player from play, depending on the mode of gameplay.

Up to eight people can battle in a room either by Manner or Free mode, but in other cases, there is a limit. For example, in Village 10, there can only be six people at a time, as there is no more room to spawn in that area. In Manner mode, teams are evenly divided by color. Free mode allows teams to be arranged in any way that suits the players.

Experience points are awarded for completing a match, more for a victory than a draw which gives more experience points than a loss, and gaining enough points will result in a level-up. Different channels are available for specific groups of levels.

=== Characters ===
There are eight default playable characters in Crazy Arcade and they are Dao, Dizni, Ethen, Uni, Mos, Kephi, Marid and Bazzi. Two additional characters, Lodumani and Santa Claus, may also have a chance of being playable when a player selects Random on the character select screen. Furthermore, an upgraded version of Evie called "Luxury Marid" (Posh Evie in America) and a different version of Plunk called "Luxury Kephi" can be purchased at the game shop for cash. Currently, "Luxury Dao", the upgraded version of Dao is in Sale in Korea, too.

Each character possesses a different set of initial and maximum stats. Count refers to how many water balloons the character can carry at once. Power refers to his or her balloons' burst radius. Speed refers to how fast he or she moves. Normal denotes well-roundedness in all areas. The characters are listed along with their primary advantage, as specified on the game's official Korean website.

=== Ranking system ===
Crazy Arcade uses a level and exp-based ranking system. There are currently 720 distinct levels. Each level is represented by four elements of categorization. From the most general to most specific, these elements are: the medal's shape, the medal's color, the stripes' color, and the stripes' number. Specific shop items, maps, and channels can only be accessed by players of certain levels.

In addition to the medal system, there is a ladder system. Ladder ranks take precedence over levels.

=== Map themes ===
BnB features at least twenty differently themed regions, each containing a number of playable maps. Winning conditions vary among each region; while in most maps a player can win by eliminating all opponents, some regions encourage players to win by clearing specific "missions" that are unique to each region.

A series of upgraded regions (indicated by an "Ex" prefix) can only be accessed by playing at a participating PC bang or purchasing a room upgrade from the game's online shop.

=== Mobile Crazy Arcade(M) ===
The mobile version, Mobile Crazy Arcade(M), is similar to the original Crazy Arcade but has more skills.

== Development and release ==
Crazy Arcade was developed and published by Nexon. It was released on 16 October 2001.

In 2003, Hudson Soft claimed that Nexon had plagiarized its video game Bomberman to create Crazy Arcade, thereby committing copyright infringement. Nexon reportedly conceded on 2 April 2003 and paid royalties to Hudson. However, Nexon later disputed Hudson's claim, arguing the latter does not have rights to exercise copyright infringement over Crazy Arcade, and filed a lawsuit against the Japanese company. The case was concluded in 2007 as the Seoul Central District Court ruled it in Nexon's favor. The court stated that there is no practical similarities between Bomberman and Crazy Arcade due to their substantially different levels, characters, and overall colors, and thus Crazy Arcade did not violate Bomberman's copyright. Nexon also stated that the earlier reports about Nexon conceding to Hudson is incorrect, as while Nexon paid a small amount of settlement to the company, it never admitted to copyright infringement.

Nexon planned to bring Crazy Arcade, as well as Dragon Nest and Mabinogi Heroes to America in 2010 under their new game portal, Block Party. Nexon America launched the official website for PopTag!, which is the North American name of Crazy Arcade. Nexon decided to forgo the closed beta testing phase and jump right into an open beta. The open beta of PopTag! began on January 26, 2010, and ended a month later. PopTag! was closed by publisher Nexon America in July 2011 due to "multiple factors including the [in]ability to deliver new content regularly due to the limited resources [...] available for the game". On 11 June 2026, Nexon announced the game would shut down on 13 August.

== Reception ==
By 17 October 2002, Crazy Arcade was a commercial success, gathering a total of 35 million players and 330 thousand concurrent users at maximum.

GameZone's Michael Splechta gave the game an 8/10: "PopTag! is a fun game that doesn't require players to invest a ton of time into it to enjoy themselves. It has fun modes that let players enjoy the game on their own, and short VS. matches that can get extremely competitive".

== Sequels ==
Crazyracing KartRider was a kart racing game spin-off released in August 2004. It was shut down in 2022 and replaced by a sequel KartRider: Drift released in 2023. KartRider: Drift was a commercial failure and its server was terminated in 2025.

Another racing game spin-off, CrazyRacing AirRider, was released on 21 July 2009. A third-person shooter named Crazy Shooting Bubble Fighter was released in 2009. It shut down on 24 June 2026. A mobile spin-off titled Crazy Arcade BnB M was released on 21 March 2019.

== See also ==
- Crazyracing KartRider
- Online Bomberman
