= Membership Training in Korea =

University orientation events in South Korea

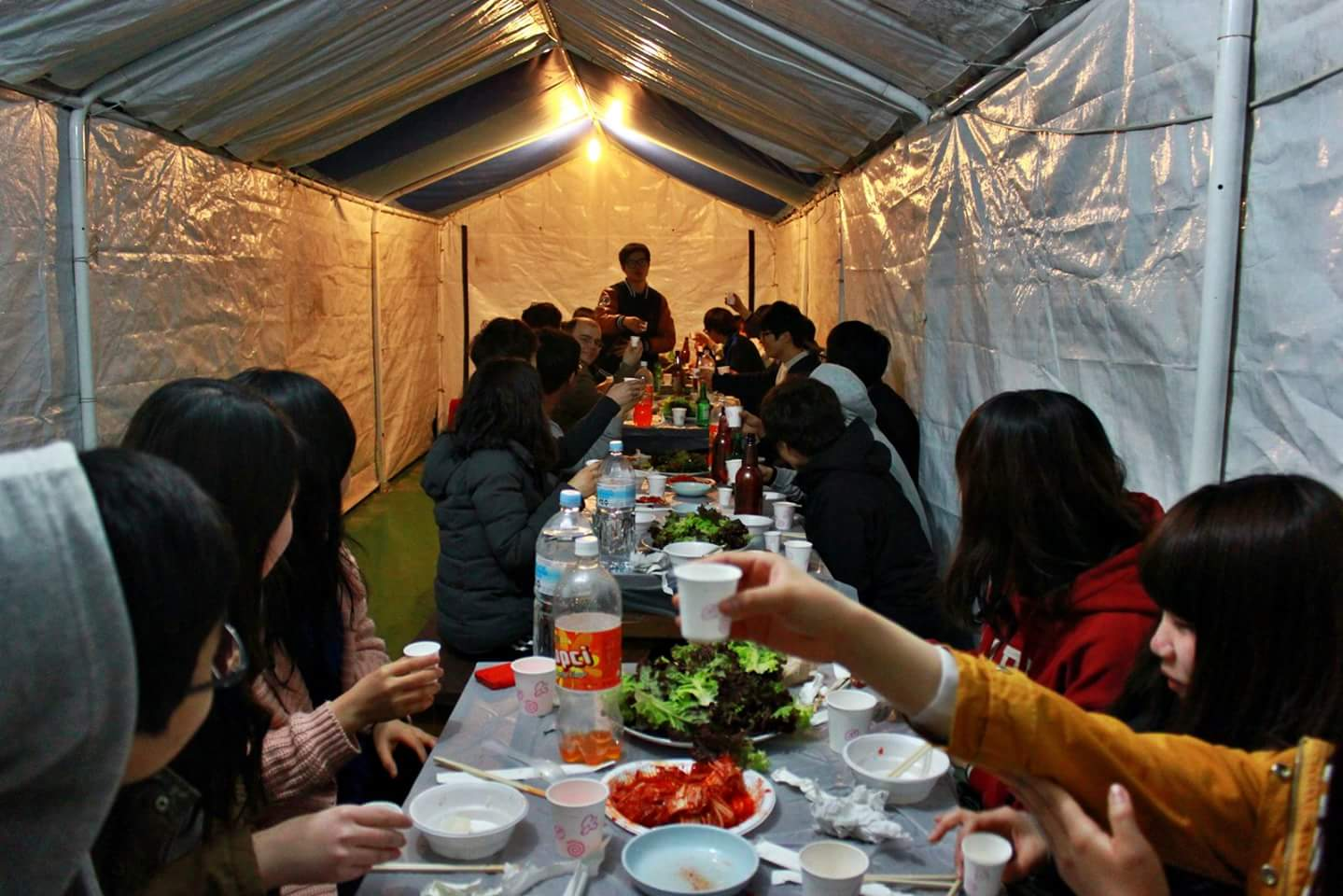
Scene of MT

Membership Training (MT) is an event held among university students in South Korea. These events last roughly two days and are considered a free-form training session, where students spend time socializing with peers in the same academic majors or clubs, often at a remote location.

== Overview ==
MTs are designed especially to establish esprit de corps among university students within the same academic year, major or club, and to encourage students and teachers of these groups to become familiar with each other. They are generally scheduled at the beginning of the school year when there is a large influx of newcomers.

The purpose of these "ice-breaking" events is to help freshman students become accustomed to campus life, to establish connections within the major or club, for members to exchange information, and to boost morale. Participants stay at resorts, often in remote locations, boarding overnight for a couple of days.

Organization of the event rests upon the student leaders. Their responsibilities include: recruiting participants, arranging recreational activities, and making reservations. The organizer's primary job is to make the event interesting and unique by applying creative flair.

== Varieties of membership training ==
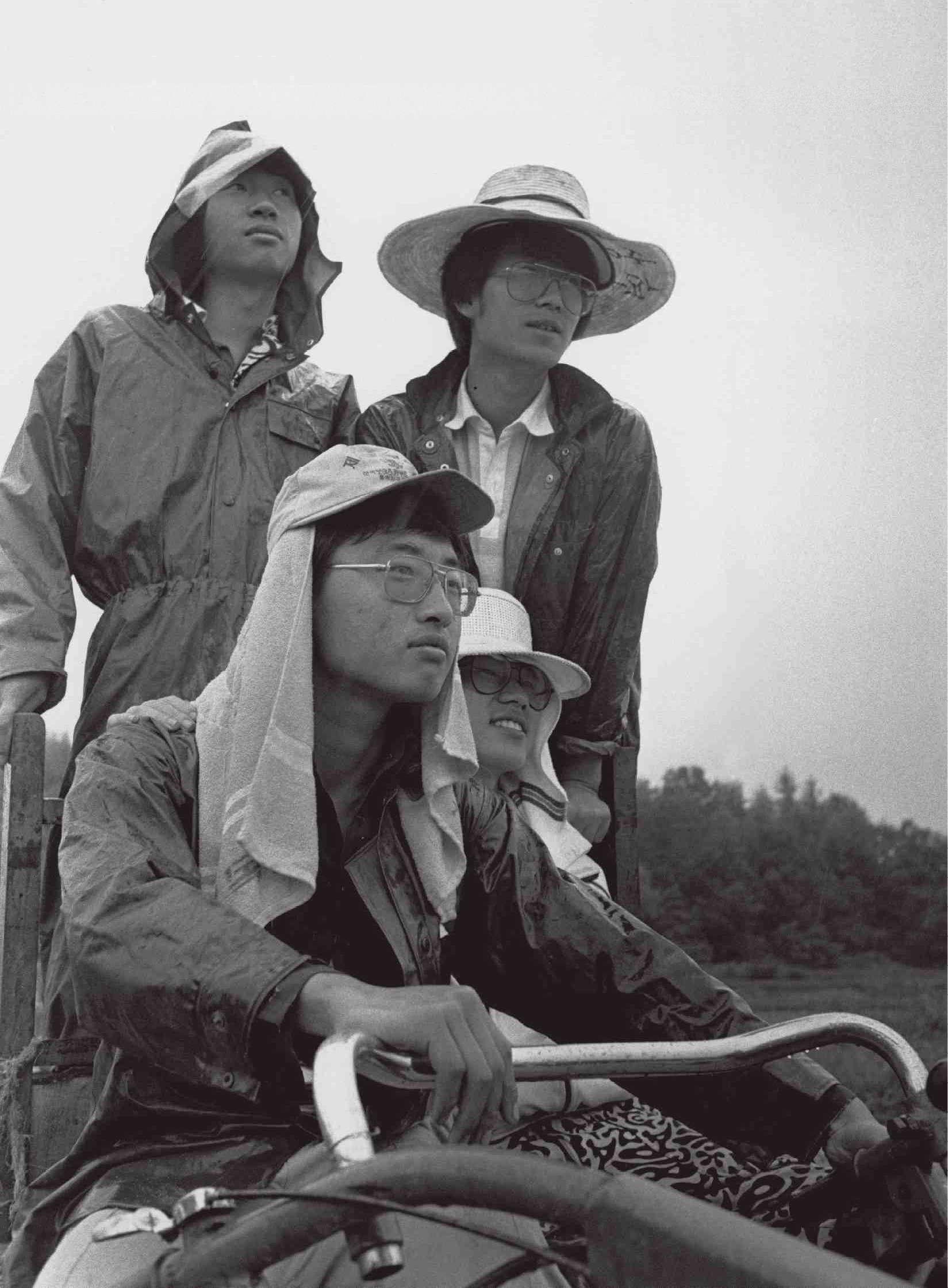
Nonghwal

There are several types of membership training.

Sae-teo (Korean: 새터) is an MT that helps freshman students learn the basics of campus life and gives them a chance to get to know other freshmen. These sessions open before lectures start, and are focused on building relationships.

"OT" is orientation for the people within the same university department. OTs are centred on conveying the necessary information about campus life, such as course registration, specific classes, and annual events. The students are introduced to the department's professors.

Students may also attend an activity called ''Nonghwal'', which is conducted by volunteers who want to help Korea's rural communities during summer vacation.

Beyond these official MTs, students also often organize unofficial MTs. They are planned by various campus clubs whose members want to create groups of like-minded friends.

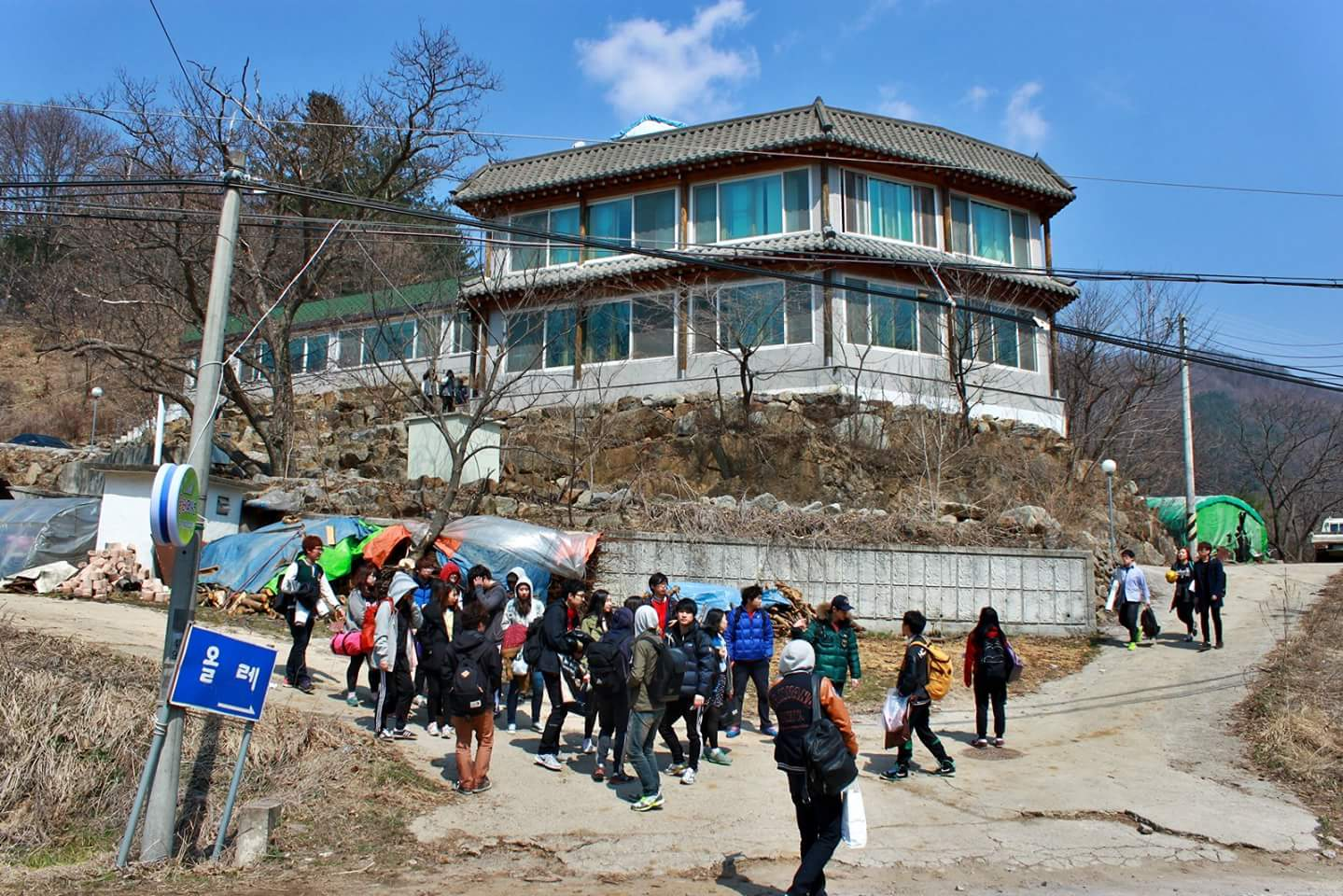
Students arriving at an MT.

== Common experiences in membership training ==
Students often travel to their destination using chartered buses.

Upon arriving, the student union prepares dinner while other students talk with professors or play games. Students sit in a circle while sharing dinner. After dinner, the student union arranges a group game to increase the students' congeniality. Some common games include quiz games, cross-dressing games, and couple games. Occasionally, student-leaders invite professional singers to perform. Leaders may then prepare an activity called "Moonlight Dating", in which students randomly choose a boy or girl counterpart and fulfill random missions outside of the resort under the moonlight.

Early the next day, the student union prepares light meals. After students complete packing their bags, they gather to take a group photo before boarding the bus and returning to school. This marks the end of the official MT; however, some students continue to meet.

== Membership training issues ==
During Membership Training, upperclassmen students may mistreat or haze underclassmen students by pressuring them to drink alcoholic beverages, such as soju or makgeolli, or by forcing them to behave in an embarrassing manner.

There have also been a few reported cases of sexual assault. The Ministry of Education has made efforts to impose restraints on these sessions, and students found committing human rights abuses can be held legally responsible, and could face severe punishments.

== See also ==
- Education in South Korea
