= Crazyracing KartRider =

2004 video game

- Developers: Lodumani Studio (2004–2011); Nexon (2011–2020, 2025-present); Nitro Studio (2020–2025)
- Publishers: Nexon (South Korea); Tiancity (China); Gamania (Taiwan)
- Platform: Microsoft Windows
- Release: KOR: June 1, 2004; CHN: October 1, 2006; TW: December 19, 2006
- Genre: Kart racing
- Modes: Single-player, multiplayer

Crazyracing KartRider (Korean: 크레이지레이싱 카트라이더) is an online multiplayer kart racing game developed by Nexon. It is part of the Crazy Arcade franchise. It earns revenue by selling virtual items within the in-game shop, including different types of vehicles and spraypaints. KartRider features fictitious fantasy vehicles and branded game models based on real-life cars, developed in collaboration with companies such as BMW Korea. The service was shut down in 2023 in South Korea but continues to operate in China.

== Gameplay ==
The game offers a variety of game modes, primarily based around collecting items or requiring the player to drift to gain boost items.

== Development and release ==
The initial South Korean service started on June 1, 2004. Localized releases launched in Mainland China as PopKart (Chinese: 跑跑卡丁车) on March 18, 2006, and Taiwan (Chinese: 跑跑卡丁車) on January 4, 2007.

A closed beta for an English release of KartRider began in America on May 1, 2007, and ended on May 31. The open beta began on October 2 and ended on March 19, 2008. All references to the game were subsequently removed from Nexon America's website without further statement.

Later localizations, which are no longer serviced, were released in Thailand, Vietnam (as BoomSpeed), Russia, Indonesia, and Japan.

The Taiwan release was shut down on January 31, 2023, followed by the South Korean service on March 31. This leaves the Chinese localization the only in operation. A relaunch of the South Korean service was announced on June 23, 2026.

== Other versions ==
Nexon America released a mobile version of KartRider for the Apple App Store under the name KartRider Rush on March 11, 2011. This version closed later on as well. A KartRider client released for Facebook called KartRider Dash was shut down in April 2014.

In May 2020, KartRider Rush+ was released on Google Play and the iOS App Store, the latter already having provided a Chinese version the year before in 2019.

A sequel, KartRider: Drift, was released in 2023. The game was a commercial failure and shut down on October 16, 2025.

== Reception ==
KartRider is widely recognized as a game inspired by the Mario Kart series. Although it was initially criticized for being a rip-off of Mario Kart, Nintendo stated that they want to maintain a constructive relationship with Nexon, just like with other game development companies in Korea.

By 2007, about 25% of South Koreans had played the game at least once. As of 2020, the game has reached a total of over 380 million registered users worldwide on the PC platform, including over half of the Korean population and over 45% of the Taiwanese population.

The mobile version KartRider Rush+ surpassed 10 million downloads globally after its first two weeks of release. It has also topped the Google Play ranking of South Korea.

By 2020, the franchise had grossed over $700 million worldwide in lifetime revenue. As of 2021, it had grossed over $1 billion worldwide.

Termination of the original South Korean service in 2023 generated noticeable backlash from its players, who saw it as an attempt to forcefully migrate them to the KartRider: Drift client, which previously failed to impress and ultimately closed two years later.
