= Mabinogi (disambiguation) =

Mabinogi may refer to:

- The Four Branches of the Mabinogi, a group of interrelated medieval Welsh prose tales
- Mabinogi (video game), a Korean video game
- Mabinogi (album), an arrange album of music from the visual novel Clannad
- Y Mabinogi, a 2003 Welsh film

== See also ==
- Mabinogion, a collection of eleven prose stories collated from medieval Welsh manuscripts
- Mabinogi Heroes (video game), a spin-off of the video game Mabinogi
