= Nexus: The Kingdom of the Winds =

1996 video game

- Developer: Nexon
- Publishers: Nexon (Korea); Kru Interactive (North America)
- Platform: Microsoft Windows
- Release: KOR: 5 April 1996; NA: 1998
- Genre: MMORPG
- Mode: Multiplayer

- Nexus: The Kingdom of the Winds
- Hangul: 바람의 나라
- RR: Baramui nara
- MR: Paramŭi nara
- IPA: [paɾamɰi naɾa]

Nexus: The Kingdom of the Winds (Korean: 바람의 나라, lit. 'country of wind') is a pay to play massively multiplayer online role-playing game. Nexus began as a US version of the Korean game 바람의 나라 (Baramue Nara) developed by Nexon Inc., and is loosely based on Korean mythology and on a series of graphic novels by an artist named Kim Jin. Development of Baram began in Korea in 1994 and the game was released on April 5, 1996. One year later, it also entered beta in the United States, going commercial in 1998. In 2005, the US subsidiary of Nexon changed its name to Kru Interactive and took over running Nexus, Dark Ages, and Shattered Galaxy as an independent company.

A few features that distinguish Nexus from other MMORPGs are its 2D tile graphics, intense player involvement, a central storyline, and its manhwa-like style. The game Lineage was based on a fork of the Nexus server software; its developer, Jake Song, was one of the original developers of Baram.

== Gameplay ==
Several characters of different types appear in the Kugnae Courtyard.

NexusTK has a flexible character development system. There are four "basic" paths to choose from: warrior, rogue, mage, and poet. Each path has one non-player-controlled subpath and three player-controlled subpaths. When a player reaches a certain level, the player may also choose one of three alignments: Kwi-Sin, Ohaeng or Ming-ken (symbolizing death, balance or life, respectively).

The four basic paths players are able to choose from each have their own styles of play. Warriors and rogues, while both damage dealers, work in slightly different ways. For example, rogues may go invisible while warriors cannot; on the other hand, warriors have the ability to "overflow" their attacks to multiple monsters while rogues cannot. Mages are excellent for soloing with their ability to paralyze creatures. The poet class has the most powerful healing spells as well as buffs and debuffs to strengthen allies and weaken creatures.

The player can choose one of four totem animals, supernatural creatures who are patrons of the primary paths. They are Chung Ryong (blue dragon), Ju Jak (red fire bird), Baekho (white tiger), and Hyun Moo (black turtle). They are based on Four Symbols in the Chinese constellations. Chung Ryong means the Azure Dragon, Ju Jak means the Vermilion Bird, Baekho means the White Tiger, and Hyun Moo means the Black Tortoise.

Leveling up is not the only aspect of character development, however. Nexus: TKOTW has a tight-knit social structure, and has many different social cliques. The Nexus community has been the lifeblood of the game to many of its players. Unlike many other MMORPGs, in NexusTK most players are known by others and are treated with a general amount of respect by the average player.

Like in nearly every MMORPG, there are different armor dyes, armor types, hair choices, hair colors, and character models to choose from. Some players choose to wear items that assemble a certain 'look' that defines who that character is. Others simply choose to wear functional outfits, and still others choose to display wealth by wearing many expensive items.

Unlike many other RPGs, character development does not end when the level cap (level 99) is reached. Players can continue to hunt and gain experience, which can then be traded in for permanent gains in health, mana, strength (with cap), magic (with cap) and agility (with cap) capacities.

== Setting ==
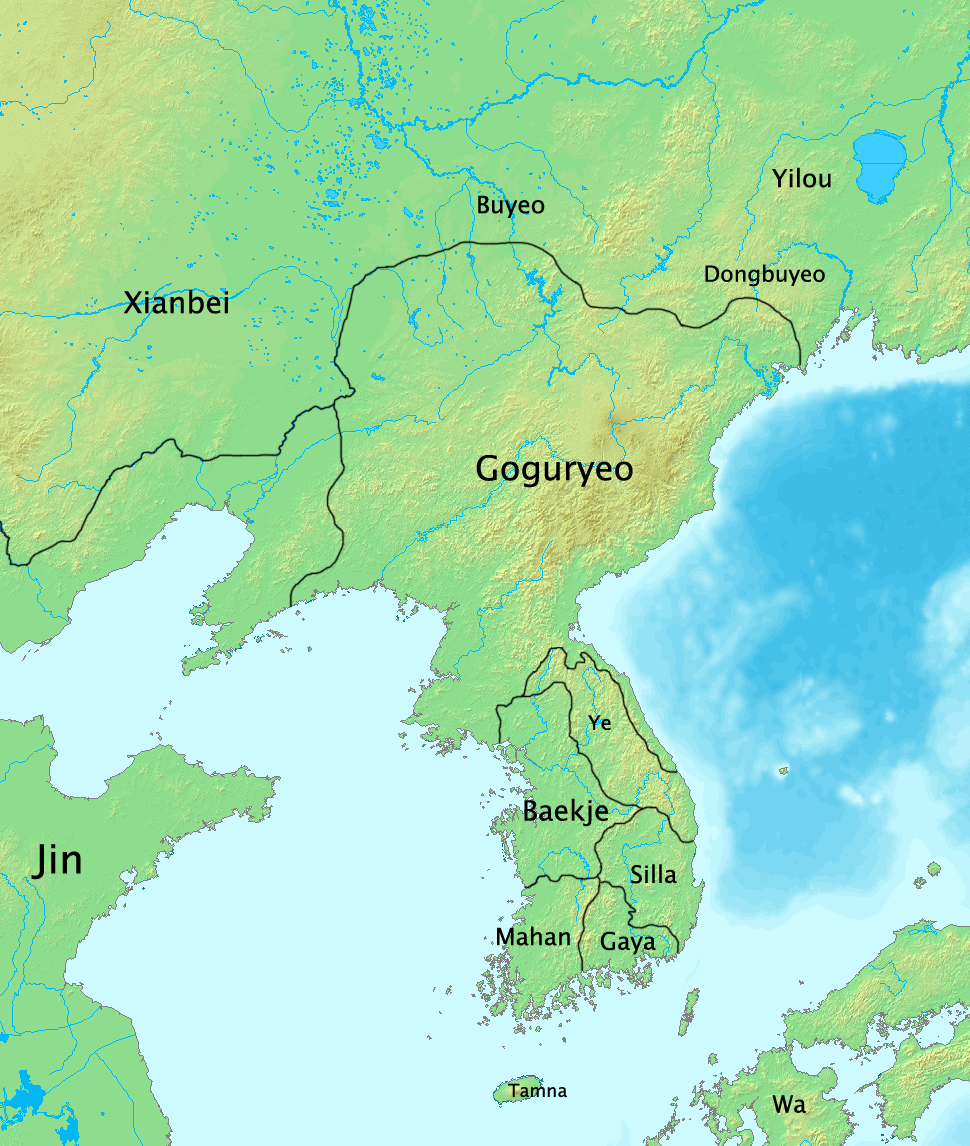
Map of the Three Kingdoms of Korea (in AD 315), on which the world of Nexus: The Kingdom of the Winds is based

Nexus is set in a land similar, geographically, to the Three Kingdoms of Korea, which existed between the 1st century BC and 6th century AD. Other lands such as Han and Ilbon, though not present in the game itself, are often referenced. In addition to the three kingdoms, there are nine villages in which a player may live. Three exist for each kingdom, containing houses which players may rent for a fee. Homes may be customized as a player sees fit using "floor plans" offered for homes of different sizes.

== Reception ==
As of 2020, Nexon reported Nexus as having a lifetime total of 21 million registered users. It claims to be the longest-running graphic MMORPG, having been in service for over 26 years.
