= Nexon =

South Korean-Japanese video game company

Nexon Co., Ltd.
- Native name: 넥슨 (Korean); ネクソン (Japanese)
- Type: Public
- Traded as: TYO: 3659
- Industry: Video games
- Founded: December 26, 1994; 31 years ago Seoul, South Korea
- Founders: Kim Jung-ju
- Headquarters: Minato-ku, Tokyo, Japan
- Key people: Junghun Lee (president and CEO); Shiro Uemura (CFO)
- Revenue: ¥274.5 billion (2021)
- Operating income: ¥91.5 billion (2021)
- Net income: ¥114.9 billion (2021)
- Owner: NXC (60.2%)
- Number of employees: 7,067 (Dec. 2021)
- Parent: NXC
- Subsidiaries: § Organization
- Website: nexon.com

Nexon Co., Ltd. (formerly Korean: 넥슨) is a South Korean–Japanese video game developer and publisher specializing in live service games. It develops and publishes titles including MapleStory, Crazyracing Kartrider, Sudden Attack, Dungeon & Fighter, The First Descendant, and Blue Archive. Headquartered in Japan, the company has offices in South Korea, the United States, Taiwan, and Thailand.

Nexon was founded in Seoul, South Korea, in 1994 by Kim Jung-ju. In 2005, the company moved its headquarters to Tokyo, Japan. However, its largest shareholder is NXC, an investment and holding company headquartered in Jeju Province, South Korea.

== History ==
First logo (1994–2009)

Nexon was established on December 26, 1994, in Seoul, South Korea. It developed and published its first title, Nexus: The Kingdom of the Winds, in 1996, which the company continues to service. Numerous other games followed, such as Dark Ages: Online Roleplaying, Elemental Saga, QuizQuiz, KartRider, Elancia, and Shattered Galaxy; some of which are maintained by a company spun off of Nexon, Kru Interactive.

=== Acquisition of Wizet ===
Wizet's logo

In April 2001, Wizet, a game development company, was established in Seoul, South Korea. The company was initially led by Seung-chan Lee, who was previously a lead developer for Nexon's QuizQuiz. Wizet would develop and eventually release MapleStory for Korea in April 2003. Shortly after its release, the game reached a milestone of 100,000 concurrent users and 2 million registered users, according to the company's now-defunct website. Wizet would launch MapleStory in Japan later that year with similar claims of success. In 2004, Nexon acquired Wizet and since then has maintained active development and publishing of MapleStory.

=== Acquisition of Neople ===
Nexon is also the developer of Dungeon & Fighter, through its wholly owned subsidiary, Neople. Dungeon & Fighter is one of the most popular free-to-play online PC games in China.

=== 2010s ===
Nexon went public on the Tokyo Stock Exchange on December 14, 2011, in an initial public offering, the largest in Japan for 2011 and the second largest by a technological company for 2011 worldwide. In April 2013, the programmer "DrUnKeN ChEeTaH" was sued by Nexon America for operating GameAnarchy, a popular subscription-based cheat provider for Combat Arms. Nexon was awarded $1.4 million in damages.

On March 9, 2016, Nexon acquired Big Huge Games, a mobile game developer in Maryland. In October 2018, a labor union was established at Nexon. On January 3, 2019, The Korea Economic Daily reported that Nexon founder Kim Jung-ju and associates had put their 98.64 percent stake up for sale. However, on July 8, 2019, Reuters reported that the plan was abandoned. On November 25, 2019, The Lego Group announced the acquisition of Bricklink, a Lego fan community from Nexon's parent company NXC, for an unknown price, which is expected to finish before the end of 2019.

In 2019, the company announced plans to acquire Embark Studios, a studio founded by Patrick Söderlund, the former Chief Design Officer of Electronic Arts.

=== 2020s ===
On June 2, 2020, Nexon announced plans to invest $1.5 billion in listed entertainment companies. By March 2021, Nexon had deployed $874 million of that amount on investments into Hasbro, Bandai Namco Holdings, Konami, and Sega Sammy Holdings. Nexon stated that it had no interest in outright acquiring or taking activist investor positions in these companies.

Blue Archive, a real-time strategy role-playing game developed by MX Studio (under Nexon Games) and IO Division, was published by Yostar in Japan on February 4, 2021, and worldwide on November 8 of the same year by Nexon.

In February 2021, Nexon announced significant pay increases for new and existing development talent in the company's Korean studios. In July 2021, Nexon announced the formation of Nexon Film and Television. The division is based in Los Angeles. In a 2021 earnings call in August, Nexon CEO Owen Mahoney declined to offer hard launch targets for highly anticipated games. In January 2022, Russo brothers-owned film production company AGBO sold a $400 million minority stake to Nexon, which is valued at $1.1 billion as Nexon takes a 38% stake. In February 2022, it was reported by Bloomberg that Saudi Arabian-based Public Investment Fund had purchased just over a 5% stake in Capcom and Nexon, reportedly worth US$883 million, while American investment company KKR acquired an 8.5% stake.

In May 2022, Nexon announced the launch of Mintrocket, a sub-brand and division of Nexon that specializes on games "focusing on the essence of fun". Its first game, Dave the Diver, was a commercial hit, selling one million copies within ten days of launch. According to its own report, the Korean region earned the company the most in Q1–Q2 2022. In late 2023, Nexon announced that CEO Owen Mahoney will be succeeded by Nexon Korea CEO Junghun Lee in 2024. Nexon announced the development of The Kingdom of the Winds 2 on October 30, 2024, the sequel to its first-ever release 28 years ago. Nexon made Mintrocket a wholly owned subsidiary in September 2024.

In July 2024, Pixelberry Studios was acquired to Series Entertainment, for an undisclosed amount.

== Lawsuits ==
In 2018, the company was fined ₩939 million (about US$717,000) for giving players false probability information surrounding microtransactions gambling for loot boxes in Sudden Attack. Nexon Korea stated that the phrase "random provision" was to suggest that the odds of obtaining each item were different, not that all of them have equal odds.

In early 2023, Nexon filed a cease and desist letter and a lawsuit against video game studio Ironmace, alleging that it stole files and ideas from Nexon's canceled project called "P3" and used them in its game called Dark and Darker. Nine "P3" project members had left the company and joined Ironmace, which was started soon after the project's cancellation in 2021. According to Ironmace, it is one of these former Nexon employees (who is alleged to have leaked the assets) who is the sued party, and not the company itself. A police complaint filed by Nexon reportedly led to a police raid of Ironmace's offices in March 2023. After the game was removed from Steam, Ironmace distributed it via BitTorrent, made available on the game's Discord server. Nexon also filed a copyright infringement lawsuit in the United States on April 20, 2023. This lawsuit was dismissed on August 17, 2023. The game is subsequently once again available on Steam.

In 2021, a MapleStory user, Kim, sued Nexon for its failure to provide detailed probability information. The Korea Fair Trade Commission reported that Nexon, for a decade, has lowered the probability of players drawing certain character equipment when spending real cash on Cubes ("and setting the probability of winning some Cubes to zero") in MapleStory. The Supreme Court ended up ruling in favor of Kim; they ordered Nexon to give back five percent of the spent money to Kim. Nexon then accepted the Korea Consumer Agency's recommendation to compensate the damaged 800,000 users; the amount of compensated in-game cash equaled to about ₩21.9 billion (US$19.1 million). In 2024, the company was fined by the Korea Fair Trade Commission for a record-breaking ₩11.6 billion (US$8.9 million) fee for misleading players over microtransactions in MapleStory, which violated South Korea's Act on Consumer Protection in Electronic Commerce.

== Organization ==
Nexon maintains various offices around the world that engage in the publishing and/or development of Nexon's games. Each region's local consolidated subsidiaries are independently managed and are responsible for developing its own strategy for its products and services.

Major Nexon group companies
Region	Company name
Japan	Nexon Co., Ltd.; gloops, Inc.
Korea	Nexon Korea Corporation; Neople Inc.; Nexon Games Co., Ltd.; JoongAng Pangyo Development Co., Ltd.; Mirae Asset Global Innovation Growth Focus Equity Privately Placed Investment Trust; VIP Global Super Growth Hedge Fund
China	Lexian Software Development (Shanghai) Co., Ltd.
North America	Nexon America Inc.; Big Huge Games, Inc.
Other	Nexon Europe GmbH; gloops Vietnam Co., Ltd.; Nexon Taiwan Ltd.; Nexon Thailand Co., Ltd.

=== Studios ===
Studios		Location	Founded/acquired	Notes
Nexon Korea		Seoul, Korea	December 1994	
Nitro Studios		Seoul, Korea	2020	previously Nexon Korea Internal Teams
devCat		Seoul, Korea	2020	previously Nexon Korea Internal Teams
Mintrocket		Seoul, Korea	2024	previously Nexon Korea Internal Teams
Nexon Games	Nexon Games Seoul	Seoul, Korea	July 2010	previously known as NAT Games
Nexon Games	MX Studio		2020 (earliest known)	previously under NAT Games prior to the restructure
Nexon Games	RX Studio		2024	Immediately formed under IO Division
Nexon Games	IO Division		2024	Acts as an umbrella company to help other Nexon games that target "subculture", as well as direct management for both MX Studio and RX Studio's live service bishoujo games.
Nexon Games	Nexon Games Pangyo	Pangyo-dong, Seongnam, Gyeonggi Province, Korea	June 2018	previously Nexon GT
Neople		Jeju City, Korea	August 2008	
Embark Studios		Stockholm, Sweden	July 2019	
Big Huge Games		Timonium, Maryland, United States	March 2016	

=== Free-to-play online virtual worlds ===
As of August 2022, Nexon Virtual Worlds' most valuable entertainment franchises are:

Franchise	Launch date	Registered players	Lifetime revenue
Dungeon & Fighter	2005	+ 850 million	> $20 billion
MapleStory	2003	+ 180 million	> $3 billion
KartRider	2004	+ 380 million	> $1 billion
Sudden Attack	2005	+ 23 million	> $0.7 billion
Nexus: The Kingdom of the Winds	1996	+ 26 million	N/A
Mabinogi	2004	+ 20 million	> $0.6 billion

=== Games for mobile and consoles ===
Nexon began as a developer and publisher of PC games. However, in 2020, the company announced plans to begin releasing both console and mobile versions of key franchises.

In 2017, Nexon previously published LawBreakers for PlayStation 4 from Boss Key Productions. In July 2020, the South Korean launch of The Kingdom of the Winds: Yeon for mobile was the top-grossing title on the Apple App Store and #2 on Google Play, 24 years after the launch of the initial The Kingdom of the Winds game in 1996. In August 2020, the release of Dungeon & Fighter Mobile in China generated more than 60 million pre-registrations before it was delayed.

Nexon operates in over 190 countries, but revenue and consumer engagement are concentrated in Asian markets. In 2021, the company announced a series of games in development for global release – with a focus on Europe and North America. Mahoney stated that it hoped to launch big titles with a 'Western sensibility', such as the game ARC Raiders from Embark Studios. In March 2022, Dungeon & Fighter Mobile was released in South Korea, and later in China in May 2022. It has announced that it will be publishing ARC Raiders, The First Descendant, Project AK, and KartRider: Drift for both PlayStation 4 and Xbox in around 2025.

== Games ==
Year	Title	Developer	Publisher	Platform	Ref.
1996	Nexus: The Kingdom of the Winds	Nexon		Microsoft Windows	
1999	Elancia	Nexon		Microsoft Windows	
1999	Dark Ages	Nexon		Microsoft Windows	
2001	Asgard	Nexon		Microsoft Windows	
2001	Crazy Arcade	Nexon		Microsoft Windows	
2003	MapleStory	Wizet	Nexon; Playpark; Gamania; Shengqu Games	Microsoft Windows	
2003	TalesWeaver	Softmax	Nexon	Microsoft Windows	
2004	Crazyracing Kartrider	Nexon		Microsoft Windows	
2004	Mabinogi	Devcat	Nexon	Microsoft Windows	
2005	Sudden Attack	Nexon GT	Nexon	Microsoft Windows	
2005	Dungeon Fighter Online	Neople	Nexon	Microsoft Windows	
2007	Elsword	KOG Studios	Nexon	Microsoft Windows	
2008	Counter-Strike Online	Nexon; Valve	Nexon	Microsoft Windows	
2008	Combat Arms	Nexon		Microsoft Windows	
2009	Crazy Shooting Bubble Fighter	Nexon		Microsoft Windows	
2010	Vindictus	Devcat	Nexon	Microsoft Windows	
2010	Dragon Nest	Eyedentity Games	Nexon	Microsoft Windows	
2011	Cyphers	Neople	Nexon	Microsoft Windows	
2012	FIFA Online 3	Electronic Arts	Nexon	Android, iOS, Microsoft Windows	
2013	ArcheAge	XL Games	Nexon	Microsoft Windows	
2013	Counter-Strike Online 2	Nexon; Valve	Nexon	Microsoft Windows	
2014	FreeStyle 2	JOYCITY	Nexon	Microsoft Windows	
2014	Closers	Naddic Games	Nexon	Microsoft Windows	
2014	Monster Squad	Nexon GT; Timecast	Nexon	Android, iOS	
2015	DomiNations	Nexon; Big Huge Games	Nexon	Android, iOS	
2015	MapleStory 2	NSquare	Nexon	Microsoft Windows	
2016	Tree of Savior	IMC Games	Nexon	Microsoft Windows	
2016	Sudden Attack 2	Nexon GT	Nexon	Microsoft Windows	
2016	Titanfall Online	Nexon		Microsoft Windows	
2016	Ghost in the Shell: Stand Alone Complex – First Assault Online	Neople	Nexon	Microsoft Windows	
2017	Dynasty Warriors: Unleashed	XPEC Entertainment	Nexon	Android, iOS	
2017	Dark Avenger 3	Boolean Games	Nexon	Android, iOS	
2017	LawBreakers	Boss Key Productions	Nexon	Microsoft Windows, PlayStation 4	
2017	Alliance vs Empire	Nexon RED	Nexon	Android, iOS	
2018	Darkness Rises	Nexon		Android, iOS	
2018	Durango: Wild Lands	Nexon; What! Studio	Nexon	Android, iOS, Microsoft Windows	
2018	FIFA Online 4	EA Spearhead	Nexon	Android, iOS, Microsoft Windows	
2018	MapleStory M	Nexon		Android, iOS	
2019	KurtzPel	KOG Studios	Nexon	Microsoft Windows	
2019	Godzilla Defense Force	Neople; Studio 42	Nexon	Android, iOS	
2019	Crazy Arcade BnB M	Nexon		Android, iOS	
2020	KartRider Rush+	Nexon		Android, iOS	
2020	V4	NAT Games	Nexon	Android, iOS, Microsoft Windows	
2020	The Kingdom of the Winds: Yeon	Nexon Korea		Android, iOS	
2020	FIFA Mobile	EA Mobile	Nexon	Android, iOS	
2021	Blue Archive	IO Division; MX Studio	Nexon; Yostar	Android, iOS, Microsoft Windows	
2021	KonoSuba: Fantastic Days	Sumzap	Nexon	Android, iOS	
2022	Dungeon & Fighter Mobile	Neople	Nexon	Android, iOS	
2022	DNF Duel	Arc System Works; Eighting; Neople	Nexon	Microsoft Windows, PlayStation 4, PlayStation 5	
2022	Argent Twilight: Secrets Of The Dark Orbs		Nexon	Android, iOS	
2022	TalesWeaver: Second Run		Nexon	Android, iOS	
2022	MapleStory Worlds	Nexon		Android, iOS, Microsoft Windows	
2023	KartRider: Drift	Nitro Studios	Nexon	Android, iOS, Microsoft Windows, PlayStation 4, Xbox One	
2023	Dave the Diver	Mintrocket		Microsoft Windows, MacOS, Nintendo Switch, Nintendo Switch 2, PlayStation 4, PlayStation 5, Xbox One, Xbox Series X/S	
2023	Warhaven	Nexon		Microsoft Windows	
2023	EA Sports FC Mobile	EA Mobile	Nexon	Android, iOS	
2023	EA Sports FC Online	EA Spearhead	Nexon	Android, iOS, Microsoft Windows	
2023	The Finals	Embark Studios	Embark Studios	Microsoft Windows, PlayStation 4, PlayStation 5, Xbox Series X/S	
2023	Dynasty Warriors M	Neobards Entertainment	Nexon	Android, iOS	
2023	Veiled Experts	Nexon		Microsoft Windows	
2024	The First Descendant	Nexon		Microsoft Windows, PlayStation 4, PlayStation 5, Xbox One, Xbox Series X/S	
2025	The First Berserker: Khazan	Neople	Nexon	Microsoft Windows, PlayStation 5, Xbox Series X	
2025	ARC Raiders	Embark Studios	Embark Studios	Microsoft Windows, PlayStation 5, Xbox Series X/S	
2026	Sudden Attack: Zero Point	Nexon		Microsoft Windows	
TBA	Nakwon: Last Paradise	Mintrocket		TBA	
TBA	Wakerunners	Mintrocket		TBA	
TBA	Mabinogi Mobile	Devcat	Nexon	TBA	
TBA	Overkill	Neople	Nexon	TBA	
TBA	MapleStory N		Nexon	TBA	
TBA	Vindictus: Defying Fate		Nexon	TBA	
TBA	Fareidolia	IO Division; RX Studio	Nexon	TBA	
TBA	Azur Promilia	Shanghai Manjuu	Nexon KR	TBA	
TBA	Embers of the Uncrowned	Nexon	Nexon	TBA	

== See also ==
- Nexon Computer Museum
