= David Kennerly =

David Kennerly may refer to:

- David Hume Kennerly (born 1947), Pulitzer Prize–winning photographer
- David Ethan Kennerly, role-playing game author
