= Jeon Min-hee =

South Korean fantasy writer (born 1975)

Jeon Min-Hee
- Born: October 22, 1975; Seoul, South Korea
- Citizenship: South Korea
- Occupation: Novelist
- Writing career
- Genre: Fantasy
- Notable work: The Stone of Days
- Website: blog.naver.com/enjolas

Jeon Min-hee (Korean: 전민희) is a South Korean fantasy writer. She was born in 1975, on October 22 and graduated Konkuk University. She has received a bachelor's degree in Politics and Diplomacy. Her debut novel, The Stone of Days, part of the Arund Chronicles, was written in 1999. It appeared in a series on Nownuri, and was published by Consonants and Vowels, then republished by Zeu Media. She has also worked on Talesweaver and Children of the Rune.

== List of novels ==
=== The Arund Chronicles ===
- 1999–2000 The Stone of Days was published by Consonants and Vowels (자음과 모음), in 10 parts.
- 2000–2001 The Tower of the Sun was published by Consonants and Vowels up to book 5, then was canceled by cover illust plagiarism of Publisher Company.
- 2004–2005 The Stone of Days was edited and republished in eight parts by Zeu Media.
- 2009– The Tower of the Sun is being edited and being republished by Zeu Media.

The Stone of Days and the Tower of the Sun belong to the same world story that will lead to the name Arund Chronicles. It will be treated in a five-part series. She wrote " The Tower of the Sun " after writing " The Stone of Days, " but stopped at book 5 because of a breach of contract by a publisher, and began writing the Children of the Rune Chronicles and revising the Stone of Days. Since then, as the revision project was completed in April 2009, the tower has been remodeled since 2009.

=== The Children of the Rune Chronicles ===
- 2001–2002 Children of the Rune, Winterer was published by Zeu Media (제우 미디어) in 7 parts.
- 2003–2004 Children of the Rune, Demonic was published by Zeu Media in 8 books.
- 2018- Children of the Rune, Blooded is on serial publication in KakaoPage

The children of Rune are the titles of a large series like the Arund Chronicles and include several novels within the series. The Children of Rune : Winterer is a novel starring Boris Jinneman, and it is complete with seven books. The Children of Rune : Demonic is a novel starring Joshua von Arnim, and it has eight books that are complete on February 20, 2007. The Children of the Rune : Blooded is about few years after the Winterer and the Demonic, starring Ispin Charles.

=== The ArcheAge Chronicles ===
- 2011 The Snowbird (눈의 새) was published online. (Later included in The Fir and the Hawk)
- 2011 The Fir and the Hawk (전나무와 매) was published in South Korea and China (2012) as novelization and backstory for the upcoming MMORPG.
- 2012 The Heirs(I) (상속자들(상)) was published in South Korea, as a sequel to The Fir and the Hawk.
- 2013 The Heirs(II) (상속자들(하)) will be published in South Korea in spring.

=== Other versions ===
- 2003 Winterer was published in Hong Kong and Taiwan, later published in China (2005), Japan (2006), and Thailand (2011).
- 2006 Demonic was published in Taiwan, later published in Japan (2007).
- ArcheAge.

== Related contents ==
Almost every piece of work by the author has a structure similar to " Pararel. " On the stone of days, the events of 200 years ago and present are similar, and in " Children of Rune : Demonic, the main characters ' stories are similar to ancestor. Both works are closely related to the ancestors of the main character. This structure adds depth to the work. The parts of the " fortuneteller ", " star " and " tarot " are shown in chronological order on the stone of the ages, Children of Rune - Demonic, and The tower of the Sun. In " The Stone of days, " the vague portion about a fortuneteller that has not appeared in detail, goes through "The tower of the Sun" and "Demonic" becomes increasingly concrete. This is closely associated with the content of the novel. Each chapter of "the tower of the Sun" is titled after the names of several of tarot cards ' Major Arcana cards, which show a connection between the meaning of each card and the content of the novel.
