= David Ethan Kennerly =

American video game developer

David Ethan Kennerly directed five massively multiplayer games in the US and Korea. He localized Korea's first world, Nexus: The Kingdom of the Winds, and designed the social system of Dark Ages. Before joining Nexon in 1997, he designed The X-Files Trivia Game for 20th Century Fox, and troubleshot US Army networks in Korea.

David encourages creativity among developers and players. He helped organize MUD-Dev Conferences, and founded an online library of fan fiction. David has authored on game design for Charles River Media, ITT Tech, Westwood College, Gamasutra.com, GameDev.net, and IGDA.

After a stint designing board games at TableStar Games, David is now doing video game design in Utah.
