= SoundTeMP =

Korean team of video game music composers

SoundTeMP is a Korean team of video game music composers. Formed in 1992, they have been creating soundtracks for MMORPG computer games. By 2002, their work in Ragnarok Online (a highly acclaimed early MMORPG) made them famous. Their most recent work is in the MMORPG Tree of Savior.

Another international MMORPG using game music from SoundTeMP since 2003 is FlyFF, which comes from Korea as well.

== SoundTeMP Members ==
- Kwon Goo-Hee (Goopal)
- Jang Seong-Woon (Nikacha)
- Park Jin-Bae (Silhouetti, ESTi)
- Park Soo-Il
- Nam Goo-Min (Nauts)

== Previous SoundTeMP Members ==
- Lee Seock-Jin (BlueBlue) (1992–2015)
- Kwak Dong-Il (Sevin) (1993–2004)

== Additional information ==
Track number 191 on Ragnarok Online's OST titled "Remembering BlueBlue" was written as a eulogy to commemorate the work of the late Lee Seock-Jin (BlueBlue), who died in 2015. BlueBlue was revealed to be the primary composer of SoundTeMP.

Due to a difference of views on music, Sevin resigned from SoundTeMP in 2004 to establish Sound Fashion Advisor (S.F.A.) S.F.A. was invited to work on music for Granado Espada, another title by Gravity. Currently, Sevin is the sound director of Tree of Savior. He leads the entire sound team, which is composed of both current and previous members of S.F.A., SoundTeMP, ESTi, Questrosound, Joon Sung Kim and Symphonix.

Park Jin-Bae (ESTi) has a YouTube channel (KR) in which he posts independent music and music related to projects he has worked on in the past or is currently working on.

== List of MMORPGs featuring music from SoundTeMP ==
- Flyff
- Granado Espada
- Ragnarok Online
- Neo Steam: The Shattered Continent
- 4leaf (2000・SOFTMAX)
- Talesweaver
- La Tale
- Tree of Savior
- Seal Online
- Corum Online (2003・Netclue)
- Yogurting (2004・Neowiz)
- Silkroad Online (2004・Joymax)
- RF Online (RF Online, 2004・CCR)

== List of other games featuring music from SoundTeMP ==
- Ys II Special (1994・Mantra, arrange)
- Lychnis (1994・Softmax, arrange)
- Genocide 2 (1995・Mantra, arrange)
- Metin2 (2004)
- Astrocounter of CRESCENTS (1996・S&T On-Line/Samsung)
- Icekiss (1997・Object Square, freeware)
- The Rhapsody of Zephyr (1998・Softmax)
- Ant Man 2 (1998・Gravity)
- Merturl Wizard (1998・OSC)
- Leithian (1999・Kama Digital Entertainment)
- The War of Genesis III (1999・Softmax)
- Fortress series (CCR)
- Arcturus (2000・Sonnori/Gravity)
- Narsillion (2002・Grigon Entertainment)
- Dream Chaser (2002・SOFTMAX)
- Cheollang Yeoljeon (2003・Grigon Entertainment)
- Magna Carta (2004・SOFTMAX)
- PangYa (2004・Ntreev Soft)
- DJ MAX / DJ MAX online
- Princess Maker series

== Musical style ==
Their soundtracks in MMORPG ranged from trance/techno, electronic to instrumental, ambient and new-age. SoundTeMP are often acclaimed for their wide experimentation with game audio styles, mixing various genres together to produce unique tracks.
