= QuizQuiz (video game) =

1999 video game

QuizQuiz (Korean: 퀴즈퀴즈), also known as Quiz Quiz, was a massively multiplayer online (MMO) quiz video game created by Nexon which used a super deformed type anime graphical style to portray the players and the few environments or non-player characters (NPCs) it contained. The game was released as a free beta download off of the Nexon Inc. website but was later discontinued in North America due to low playerbase. Released in 1999, it was one of the first free-to-play games using a microtransaction revenue model. The game remained available in South Korea, Japan, and Singapore but the Singapore and Japan servers were later shut down as well in December 2004. It consisted of over 1000 questions.

== General gameplay ==
After signing up and logging in, players would be redirected to a lobby, where they could chat (limited, a more full-featured chat was available in player-created chat rooms) with other online players and view the currently open games. The games all were trivia-oriented or puzzle games such as Reversi. Once the game they wished to play was open, all interested players could join the game by clicking on its button. Games supported anywhere between two and thirty-two players. Players were rewarded for doing well in the games with an in-game currency which they could use to buy items and clothes for their characters. Most items did nothing but make player's avatar look good and show how smart they are, thus allowing player to gain the respect of other players. Other items, however, powered the player up in some of the games, such as sunglasses in the true-false game. A player's overall score in the games was measured by an IQ meter. Most items required a certain IQ score to be attained before the player was allowed to purchase that item.

== Games ==
Note: None of the names may be accurate, this is due to the lack of a current English website.

Several games were available in QuizQuiz, most of them involving trivia or puzzle elements. Several versions of the games were available.

=== Survival Olla Olla Game ===
The Survival Olla Olla Game consisted of nine players all lined up in buckets hanging over a body of water containing crocodiles for the trivia game, or sharks for the typing game. The buckets would all start in the middle of the screen and when the game began. In the trivia game, multiple choice questions would be asked by the server and would be answered by the players using the function keys (f1-f4). If a player got the question right, his or her bucket would be raised, otherwise, it would be lowered. If the player's bucket reached the water, that player would be eliminated and booted back to the lobby with a slight IQ deduction. If a player reached the top, that player would be considered the winner, but in some versions, if nobody reached the top, the last player alive would win. The winner would gain IQ. The game would continue until all players had either reached the top or the bottom. Players would often share the answers with each other in an effort for all players to gain IQ. There would also be an incentive for players who know the right answers to give false answers on purpose so as to cause other players to fall. The typing game had pretty much the same concept, except instead of answering trivia questions, a sentence would be shown on the screen and the players would compete to see who could type it out the fastest. If the players had a typing error in their sentence, the player's bucket would drop. If they typed the sentence correct, their bucket would rise. The person who typed the sentence the fastest could see their buckets rise faster than the others.

=== Survival OX ===
In OX, thirty-two players would enter a large board as small light-blue bubble avatars. The board would have a large X on one side and a large O on the other. After a time the game would begin, whether thirty-two players were present or not. 'True or False' questions would be asked and players would need to click on the side they wished to go to, X for false and O for true. Certain items would allow player's avatar to move much faster, allowing last minute decisions, or more commonly, switch answers at the last minute fooling other players. Newer players would often follow other players who took the initiative to move first, so faster and crueler players would purposely fool the newbies for fun. An alternate version was available where the opposite answer must be selected, called XO. In this version, the board was Halloween themed and evil laughter could be heard at the start of the game.

=== Virus ===
Virus was a game similar to Reversi or Ataxx where four players, two on each team would face off, taking turns with their teammate to outwit the other team. Players could chat privately with their teammate or publicly with the everyone.

=== MediaMedia Gameshow ===
In a game which looked similar to a StarCraft themed Jeopardy! stage, three players would stand behind podiums which were themed like the Terran, Protoss, and Zerg HUDs in StarCraft and be asked questions about computer and video games of all genres from all eras.

=== Love Love ===
Another game was Love Love, a dating game where users would be put with someone who they voted for, and when that was over the user would start quizzes.

== QuizQuiz North American community ==
Despite the player base of the North American beta version being low, there was a community surrounding the game that mostly resembled a clique structure. Like many other massively multiplayer games, clans were formed in QuizQuiz. Unlike other games where clans are used as a way to obtain people to hunt with or gain experience with, clans in the North American version of QuizQuiz were social hubs where a newcomer to the game could meet new people and chat. This is due to QuizQuiz's large social component and relatively weak gaming component. In the heyday of QQ North America there were many clans, notably:

- PABM (Pink And Blue Mentos, QQ's first clan)
- The Super Squirtle Squad
- Tang Bang Calao
- Team Rocket
- Legendary 7
- Legendary Birds

The majority of the clan websites are no longer online. There was also a petition that had upwards of 500 people sign to get Nexon to add new features or maintain the North American version.

== Aftermath ==
QuizQuiz has evolved into the Korean online game Q-Play and has been dropped from all servers outside of South Korea. The Japanese version of QuizQuiz, which remained similar to the North American beta version, was dropped in December 2004.

The character sprites were later put into a Nintendo DS game called Ping Pals. This game allowed users to purchase clothes similar to the way clothes are collected in QuizQuiz.

== QuizQuiz R ==
In April 2011, Nexon Korea made a CBT for QuizQuizR that lasted until May 19. It featured a new mode and made a raffle for real life games (Blue Marble Game, HalliGalli Game and 2 more prizes).
