= Sudden Attack =

2005 video game

- Developer: Nexon GT
- Publisher: Nexon
- Director: Kim Taehyun
- Platform: Windows
- Release: KOR: August 23, 2005
- Genre: First-person shooter
- Mode: Multiplayer

Sudden Attack (Korean: 서든어택) is a free-to-play multiplayer first-person shooter online game developed by the South Korean company GameHi. The North American service for Sudden Attack was terminated on January 29, 2014.

By June 2020, the game had over 23 million registered users worldwide and grossed over $500 million in lifetime revenue. By December 2021, the game grossed over $600 million.

A sequel, Sudden Attack 2, was launched in 2016.

== Gameplay ==
There are two teams in the game, red and blue. The red team is the Tanzirilo Independence Force, and the blue team is the United Great Force. There are various types of game play matches in different maps. Deathmatch, Destruction, capture the flag, or custom modes (sniper only, pistol only, or knife only). Both teams must satisfy certain conditions, such as defusing a bomb, successful planting and detonation, or achieving a certain number of kills.

There are two types of currencies: Cash and Points. Cash is based on real money and can be charged in exchange for a monetary payment, cell phone billing, or home phone billing and by bank transfer. Points can be earned from playing games. Points and cash can be spent at the in-game shop. Points are used for buying weapons. Cash enables the purchase of in-game boosts (i.e. +50% points) and special bonus items, along with special team-specific outfits. Cash and points can also be earned through participation in promotions.

In July 2018, a new event currency SP was added, which stands for Sudden Point, and is a new commodity needed to purchase items at SP stores or flea markets. SP can be obtained through various events in the game.

== Development and release ==
Sudden Attack was developed by Nexon. It was launched on 23 August 2005. It was released during the time first-person shooters were on trend, with competition from Special Force and Karma Online.

By September 2011, Sudden Attack's Taiwanese publisher, Gamon, did not renew its contract with Nexon to operate the game in Taiwan. A few months later, Gamania, which had published many of Nexon's games including Counter-Strike Online, obtained the rights. The game was renamed "S.A. STORM" (Chinese: 突擊風暴). The game's closed beta started on February 22, 2012 and became fully operational on April 18.

== Sequel ==
A sequel, Sudden Attack 2, was released on 6 July 2016. It closed down on 29 September 2016.
