= Children of the Rune =

South Korean novel series

- Author: Jeon Min-hee
- Original title: 룬의 아이들
- Language: Korean
- Genre: Fantasy
- Publisher: Jeu Media, Elixir
- Publication date: 2001
- Publication place: South Korea
- Media type: Print (22 volumes)
- ISBN: 89-5465-622-6

Children of the Rune (Korean: 룬의 아이들) is a South Korean novel series by Jeon Min-hee. It is set in the same world found in the online video game TalesWeaver, but has a different storyline. The world first appeared in a Korean online chatting program, 4Leaf. It has three parts; the first is Winterer and the second is Demonic. The third part is Blooded.

== Publishing ==
The novel was first published by Jeu Media (제우미디어), a publishing company of South Korea. The novel was second published by Elixir (엘릭시르), which is a brand created by Munhakdongne (문학동네), a publishing company in South Korea. This was published in web novel form.

By mid-2000s, official translations of the book had been published in Chinese (Simplified, Traditional), Japanese, and Thai language.

- Part 1: Winterer
- Part 2: Demonic
- Part 3: Blooded

Part 1, Winterer, consists of seven volumes and mainly focuses on the growth period of the main character, Boris Jineman. Winterer is the family sword given to Boris and a mission to protect, and at the same time, it has the meaning of 'one who survives the winter', symbolizing Boris himself.

Part 2, Demonic, consists of a total of nine volumes and mainly tells the story of the main character, Joshua von Arnim. Joshua is a 'demonic', possessing a demonic genius that appears over several generations as a unique characteristic of the Arnim family. The story unfolds when a person who is jealous of Joshua creates a doppelganger doll.

Part 3, Blooded, with volume one published on November 21, 2018, is a new work for the first time in about 11 years. The main character, Charlotte Bietris de Orlanne, is on an adventure to find traces of her missing brother, a book she inherited from her mother. It is a story about developing one's own ability, 'Blooded', and establishing one's self-identity. 'Bloody' is also Charlotte's unique ability, and is presumed to be a word that symbolizes her ego.

== Geography ==
All nations are on a single continent shaped like Australia. The middle of the continent is dominated by a desert named "Mortal Land" (필멸의 땅), literally "a land that when entered guarantees death". To the west is Anomarad, the main area of TalesWeaver. The Anomarad area has a milder climate, compared to the northern areas such as Orlanne or Lemme. Before Ganapoly was founded, the whole continent was said to be an endless wasteland. Far to the south lies Ichabon Islands, and to the far north lies the Moon Island.

== Kingdoms and their history ==
Anomarad (아노마라드): The capital city is Keltica (켈티카). It is the main area of TalesWeaver, and the Nenyaffle Institute is situated here. It has a mild climate. A few years before the novel, the republic government had fallen, and the political situation is still unstable. It is governed by royalty, and the republic resistance has a major hub here.

Travaches (트라바체스): It is the south area of the continent, and is in a basin. This causes cold, dry winds from the mountains to sink down. The capital is Ron. It is the homeland of Boris Jineman, the main character of the first book, Winterer. The government is a titular republic, but in reality the governor is elected by political ties.

Mortal Land, an area of the ancient magic kingdom of Ganapoly (필멸의 땅, 가나폴리): Now a desert filled with ghosts and ruins, before the historical age it was an area of Ganapoly.

Rugdurnense Union (루그드넨스 연방): South-eastern area. It is a union of city-states. It has passed its peak of prosperity, and the capital is changed annually.

- Durnensa (두르넨사): A city-nation infamous for piracy and trading
- Lekordable (레코르다블): Due to the proximity to Mortal Land, there are many mercenaries
- Rugran (루그란): The oldest nation in the union. Culture hub of the whole continent, and origin of the Silver Skull
- Palshue (팔슈): Separated from Durnensa
- Haiakan (하이아칸): South-eastern coastal area. The beautiful shores and sunny skies encourage rich people to buy vacation houses there.

Ichabon Islands (이카본 군도): The Arnim family owns this area. They are descendants of the Ganapoly. To prove their loyalty to Arnim family, they regularly pay tribute. The Anomarad people believe the islands are deserted. Two notable islands are Perriwinkle (페리윙클) and Red Sky Island (노을섬).

Moon Island (달의 섬): Currently is independent of the nations of the continent. The only way to reach the island is by stopping at Ebb Island (썰물섬), between the continent and the Moon Island. The people worship the Goddess of the Moon and want to reconstruct 'the ancient kingdom'. Many things resemble Ganapoly. The names of people are said to predict their life. People on the continent don't know the island exists.

Sansruria (산스루리아): Northeastern area of the continent, isolated by the sea and Mortal Land. One of this country's customs is it practices theocracy. They worship the god Sansru (which is the name of Sansruria's capital); only the high priestess can become Queen. The princess cannot marry before being enthroned.

Lemme (렘므): Northern area of the continent. Barbarians and civilized people coexist, yet the air is tense. The capital is Eltivo.

Orlanne (오를란느): The northwestern area of the continent. It is ruled by the Orlanne family. The capital is Orlie.

=== Ganapoly ===
An ancient kingdom of magic which fell due to the Weapons of Evil (악의 무구). It is said that everyone, including children and beggars, could use magic. The strongest magician was to take the throne and rule over Ganapoly. Ganapoly was situated in a great desert. Mortal Land was created because of the failed magic Prayer of Extinguishment (소멸의 기원), which not only eradicated the evil scourging the land, but also whisked away the bodies (but not the souls) of the magicians casting the spell, causing them to become deranged ghosts.

== Characters ==
Characters original to Children of the Rune do not have official romanization.

=== Episode 1: Winterer ===
(윈터러, which is also the name of Boris's sword)

Boris Jineman (보리스 진네만) – The main character in Winterer. His name means 'warrior'. He is from Travaches and is the second son of Jurken Jineman. He learned the holy chant in the Moon Island, but is unable to use it because of a vow he took before leaving the islands for the final time. His sword fighting style is called Tigris, and is one of Ganapoly's styles. His other name is Daphnen, meaning 'laurel tree', or 'peace', which he uses in the Moon Island.

Yevgnen Jineman (예프넨 진네만) – Brother of Boris. After realising that his wound is slowly affecting his sanity and causing him to attack his brother, he kills himself.

Lucian Kaltz (루시안 칼츠) – Friend of Boris. His father is a wealthy merchant. He is compared to spring (while Boris is compared to winter).

Nayatrei (나야트레이) –The last survivor of her tribe. She followed a red-haired man because he saved her life. Her weapons are daggers, knives, and axes, and she can disarm other people. Her tribe is related to Ganapoly.

Issaac Dukastel (이자크 듀카스텔) – He helps Boris and Isolet, while escaping two of the Four Wings. Also known as Sigonu.

Ispin Charles/Charlotte Bietris de Orlanne (이스핀 샤를/샤를로트 비에트리스 드 오를란느) – She briefly appears during the Silver Skull competition.

Lanziee Rosenkranz (란지에 로젠크란츠) – A republicanist from Keltica, the capital city of Anomarad. Friend of Boris. Helps boris to escape from Count of Bellnore (spelling is not certain).

Moon Island

Isolestie (이솔레스티) – Her name is usually shorted to Isolet. She is the daughter of Ilios, previous Priest of Sword. She is the only person who knows Tiella (a fighting style that uses two swords). She taught the Holy Chant to Boris. Her name means 'Noble Isolation'. Isolet and Boris have emotion similar to love to each other.

Nauplion (나우플리온) – Teacher of Boris. In the island of the Moon, he is the Priest of swords. Because of the rules of the island, he has many fictitious names: Walnut, Isilder San, and others. His name means 'Navigator'.

Liliope (리리오페) – Daughter of the ruler of the Moon Island. Her name means 'Voice of a Lily'. She causes the banishment of Boris.

Endymion (엔디미온) – Ghost, living in the ghost's layer of the island. He gave a dice to Boris that can cast illusion spells. He is called as 'Your High-ness' from other ghosts.

Mortal Land (Ganapoly)

Epiviono (에피비오노) – The only survivor of the Prayer of Destruction, a failed spell that was attempted to prevent the fall of Ganapoly. Neither dead or alive, he cannot die. When he is in Ganapoly, he kills the adventurers who come to steal the ancient treasures. He doesn't know how he survived and became immortal. When he was young he was known as the child genius because of his aptitude in magic, that remains unchanged. After becoming immortal, his body is turned into a skeletal state but his face remains unchanged. His name means 'To Survive'.

=== Episode 2: Demonic ===
Many characters from the first book also appear in the second.

Joshua Von Arnim (조슈아 폰 아르님) – Son of Duke Franz Von Arnim from Keltica. He is also known as "Demonic" because of his genius, even young age, he could plan critical strikes to the democratics. He is the main character of part 2.

Maximin Liebkne (막시민 리프크네) – He is the best friend of Joshua. He had an unhappy childhood because his father ran away; now he doesn't believe in fathers. Even compared to the Demonics, he has great logical skills—sometimes over a Demonic's level. He also has good instincts. His violin, 'Capriccio', can play Holy Chants, but the violin is difficult to play. He is afraid of Juspian's family and runs away from them, and hates learning about magic in the Nenyaffle.

Clariche de Avril (클라리체 데 아브릴) – Riche is her nickname. Her other name is Riche Mongpleine. She worked as a seamstress before meeting Joshua. Although it was not directly mentioned, she went back to being a seamstress after the events in book 8.

Lanziee Rozenkranz (란지에 로젠크란츠) – After sending Boris away, Lanziee became a republican. He planned the fall of the Arnim family, which played a critical role in the fall of the Keltica Republic. When he failed to kill Duke Arnim, he was captured by the kingdom's 8th Corp. After suffering immense torture, he escaped prison with the help of the Arnim family itself. He goes into hiding at Neyaffle.

Evenoa von Arnim (이브노아 폰 아르님) – Elder sister of Joshua. She is intellectually disabled, but she sometimes wins against Joshua at chess. Both she and Joshua like each other, and Joshua is shocked when she died of poisoning.

Hispanie von Arnim (히스파니에 폰 아르님) – Grandfather of Joshua. He is a demonic, but he can't see any ghosts.

Alberike Juspian (엘베리크 쥬스피앙) – Father of Tichel. He ages extremely slowly compared to regular humans. He made a flying ship based on Ganapoly's ships.

Tichiel Juspian (티치엘 쥬스피앙) – Born into a magician family. She is very pure and naive. She is the teacher of Maximin.

Cloe Da Pontina (클로에 다 폰티나) – Daughter of Duke Fontina from Keltica. Renowned for being perfect in every aspect among the nobles. Briefly appeared in both Winterer and Demonic.

Anarose Tikaram (아나로즈 티카람) – She was the greatest magician after the Ganapoly fell. She sealed a fragment of the "Bleeding Spear", one of the artifacts that brought about the fall the Ganapoly.

Aurellie Tikaram (아우렐리에 티카람) – a beautiful girl with long all-white hair and a little blonde. Her grandmother is the late Weatheren Tikaram. The only alive descendant of Anarose and Ichabon. She is the master of necromancy and her tactics are more skillful than that of Joshua. She later became a necromancy teacher to him for a while.

The Promised Ones (약속의 사람들) – They were the right arm of Ichabon von Arnim, first of the Arnim family and the first Demonic. When their promise didn't come true, they became ghosts after death. They follow Joshua, a descendant of Icavone. In the end, their promise is fulfilled and they pass into the Promised land, north of the continent.

Kelslity Balmiad (켈스니티 발미아드) – Best friend of Ichabon von Arnim, and one of the Promised Ones. Many years after his death, he meets Joshua and becomes his friend.

Teostid da Moro (테오스티드 다 모로) – Husband of Evenoa. He loves only Evenoa and doesn't care for Joshua.

Annistan Voelf (애니스탄 뵐프) – Friend of Teo, and a mage. He made the main part of Teo's plan, Max Cardi.

Max Cardi (막스 카르디) – He is a clone of Joshua. He was given the name by Joshua, to be used as a stage name.

Salaryman (샐러리맨) – An assassin for hire. He is a top-class fighter. He chased Joshua, nearly killing him every time they met. His right hand was enchanted with a fragment of the Bronze Shield, one of the Weapons of Evil. He has a slight agoraphobia.

== Special items and abilities ==
Winterbottom Kit
A piece of plate armor and a bastard sword. They are magical items of the Jineman family, and was found in the Ganapoly ruins. Their power is second only to the Four Evil Weapons when they were whole.

Snowguard – A white chain armor. It was buried with Yevgnen, and exists no more.

Winterer – A white bastard sword. The sword only tries to achieve the wielder's wish. Many souls are trapped in it.

Weapons of the Evil
Cause of the fall of the Ganapoly. The easiest way to destroy them is to implant them into the body of a living being; however, the being is controlled by and can use the power of the Weapon, thus making it hard to destroy. Another way to destroy them is to use the Prayer of Extinction. This method requires more than one highly skilled Ganapolian magician, and they must sacrifice their lives.

Bleeding Spear (피흘리는 창) – The largest fragment, the Spear was sealed in the underground of Twilight Island, part of Perriwinkle Islands. Anarose keeps the spear head sealed.

Brass Shield (황동빛 방패) – The Brass Shield was said to be shattered into countless pieces by Evgenis.

Silver Helm (은빛 투구)

Green-blue Cuirass (녹청의 장갑)

Dolls

Normal type: It looks like a human, yet only has enough intelligence to do simple, repetitive tasks.

Clone type: It is a complete clone, including memories, of a single person. It is usually controlled by a 'core' that is stored separately from the doll.

Magic Mirrors

Common type: Door to its "pair" mirror.

Wish Mirror: Door to anywhere, including other dimensions or imaginary realms. They read the user's wish. Only two mirrors are known to have existed; one is in the capital city ruin of Ganapoly, and the other disappeared from Perriwinkle Island.

Talents

Demonic – It is talent in every field: magic, playing music, singing, logic, even ruling over and communicating with ghosts. Except Ichabon, Hispanie, and Joshua, all demonics ultimately went mad.

Tiella, Tigris – A swordfighting style from Ganapoly. Tiella is a duel-wielding style, and Tigris uses one long sword. Because these swordsmanships are close to magic, they have special abilities. One skill of the Tiella strikes life energy directly, while in Tigris the speed of sword accelerates and the sword seemingly arcs in useless directions, only to strike at the weak points of the enemy. The sword style is described as "breaking the rhythm of the fight".

Holy Chant – Magical songs that realizes magic from the music. Maximin's violin can play it, but he doesn't have sheet music. "Demonic" Joshua can sing it without training, but he doesn't know the theory for composing it. Only Isolestie and Boris know the theory and can compose and sing it. Evipiono can also sing, but he is a Ganapolian.

== Media franchise ==
An audio drama adaptation was released on April 3, 2020. A webcomic adaptation launch on Webtoon on July 1, 2024.

In 2000, Softmax recruited novelist Jeon Min-hee to create 4LEAF, based on the universe. Originally, TalesWeaver was planned to completely share the universe envisioned by Jeon Min-hee. However, in 2001, Softmax suddenly decided that it would not be possible to tie the story and the actual game progress as many limitations were revealed during the production of the actual game, and announced that it would proceed with the novel and the game in different universe. As Softmax gave up on media mix, she gradually began to write differently from the same universe for novels and games. She published her independently written this novel in 2001, which tells the story of a prequel to 4LEAF in a dark and lyrical atmosphere. This filled the setting that was not revealed during the 4LEAF era with a harsh and political drama. The main content was a growth period in which the teenage protagonists matured personally after a long adventure.
