= Sudden Attack 2 =

2016 video game

- Developer: Nexon GT
- Publisher: Nexon
- Engine: Unreal Engine 3
- Platform: Windows
- Release: July 6, 2016
- Genre: First-person shooter
- Mode: Multiplayer

Sudden Attack 2 (Korean: 서든어택 2) was a free-to-play multiplayer first-person shooter online game developed by the South Korean company GameHi (Nexon GT) as a sequel to the original Sudden Attack.

Launched in July 2016, Sudden Attack 2 was shut down 23 days later due to an end of contract with the game developer.

== Gameplay ==
The game featured much of the same modes and play styles from the original game with added customization for characters and a newer game engine which allowed for more updated graphics.

== Development and release ==
Sudden Attack 2 was developed by Nexon GT, and is a sequel to Sudden Attack (2005). It was produced by Lee Gwangho and An Seongwon. The team consisted of approximately 100 developers and the overall production took 4 years.

After its initial launch, the developers had decided to cancel their contract with Nexon to publish the game resulting in the game's development halting. Besides the contract cancellation, the over sexualization of the game's main female characters resulted in backlash from gamers who felt it was inappropriate and over the top. The reaction led to the studio apologizing for the appearance of the characters and removing them entirely from the game.

Sudden Attack 2 was launched on 6 July 2016. Nexon announced on 30 July that it would shut down the game's server. The game's technical issues and negative player response to free-to-play model were discussed as the reasons for its failure. The game's service was terminated on 29 September. Plans for a Japanese launch of the game were never realized due to the abrupt shutdown of its servers.
