= Vindictus =

2010 video game

- Cover featuring Lann, one of the playable characters
- Developer: devCAT
- Publisher: Nexon
- Director: Eun-Seok Yi
- Engine: Source
- Platform: Microsoft Windows
- Release: January 21, 2010: KOR: January 21, 2010; NA: October 13, 2010; EU: October 5, 2011; JP: November 30, 2011; CHN: December 22, 2011; TW: December 23, 2011; AU: November 15, 2012; THA: December 12, 2015
- Genres: Action MMORPG, hack and slash
- Mode: Multiplayer

Vindictus is a free-to-play massively multiplayer online role-playing game (MMORPG) created by devCAT, an internal studio of Nexon. The story follows the player character joining a group of mercenaries and going on a series of missions to battle monsters. The gameplay has players exploring dungeons, fighting monsters, and upgrading their characters.

The game was originally released on January 21, 2010 as Mabinogi Heroes (Korean: 마비노기 영웅전) in South Korea, and then later in North America and other regions. It is a prequel to devCAT's previous MMORPG Mabinogi set in the same world, although the two games have different gameplay. Vindictus is a live service game with new content being added in free updates over time. On release the game received generally positive reception, particularly for its combat.

== Gameplay ==
Gameplay of playable character Evie fighting the Gnoll Chieftain boss from season 1.

Vindictus features hack and slash combat where players can perform a variety of attacks, combos, and specials moves while dodging or blocking enemy attacks. The combat also has a physics system where players can pickup and attack with various objects, grapple and throw enemies, and destroy parts of the environment. Unlike other MMORPGs, Vindictus does not have an open world. Instead, players start in a central hub town, and can select combat missions from a list. New missions are unlocked as the player levels up and progresses through the story. Missions will typically have the player progress through several rooms of a themed dungeon fighting monsters and avoiding traps, and then end with a boss fight. Most missions can be played in a group of 1-4 players, with some raid missions allowing groups of 8 or more players. In the hub town between missions players can upgrade their equipment, learn new skills, and complete side quests for NPCs.

Instead of creating a custom character and selecting a class, Vindictus has preset characters with unique appearances and abilities. For example, Lann is a male fighter who dual wields melee weapons, and Evie is a female magician who casts spells in combat. At launch the game had only 3 playable characters, but over 20 additional characters have been added in updates since then. Players select one of these existing characters to play as, but have some freedom to customize their appearance with different clothing, hairstyles, makeup, etc. Some characters can swap between two different weapon types with distinct gameplay and abilities. For example, Evie can either wield a staff to cast long range magic spells, or equip a battle scythe and use a mixture of spells and melee attacks.

== Plot ==
Vindictus is a prequel to Mabinogi, set in the same world several hundred years earlier. The lore is inspired by Celtic mythology. The story is primarily told through visual novel segments with the player character talking to different NPCs in the game's towns to progress the plot. Some major story moments also have animated cutscenes and voice acting.

The story of Vindictus is released episodically with new content being added over time. These episodes are grouped into larger seasons. In season 1 the player character is a new member of the crimson blade mercenaries, who get caught up in a war between humans and fomors. Season 2 has the player travel to the island town of Malina and join a group of treasure hunters called the coffer chasers. Season 3 takes the player to the underground city Berbhe, as they investigate everyone losing their memories of the previous seasons. Season 4 is a direct continuation of season 3 as the player and their allies continue to face new threats.

== Development ==
Vindictus was developed and published by Nexon. It was developed in the Source engine. Director Eun-Seok Yi explained in an interview that they chose the Source physics engine in order to make the entire world more realistic and interactive. Vindictus is a prequel to the MMORPG Mabinogi which was also developed by devCAT. A third game in the series titled Mabinogi II: Arena was also in development, but canceled in 2014.

In 2015 an update was released for Vindictus containing artwork from Diablo III: Reaper of Souls. Nexon removed the image and apologized.

== Release ==
Vindictus was officially announced at G-Star 2007 with release window for 2008, but delayed several times. It was released in South Korea on January 21, 2010. In North America Vindictus launched as an open beta on September 15, followed by the full release one month later. The game was originally distributed through Nexon's website, and was later released on Steam in 2012. From 2011 to 2015 the game was also released in Europe, Australia, and other parts of Asia, although some of those regional versions have since been shut down, or merged with the North American server.

== Reception ==
Reception

Aggregate score
Aggregator	Score
Metacritic	76/100

Review scores
Publication	Score
Eurogamer	7/10
PC Gamer (US)	82/100

Vindictus received "generally favorable" reception, according to review aggregator Metacritic.

John Bedford of Eurogamer rated Vindictus 7/10 praising the game's graphics, combat, and controls, but criticized its microtransactions. Mike Splechta from GameZone also praised the combat and called Vindictus "a huge advancement" in free-to-play MMOs but complained about repetition in the dungeons which "constantly recycle rooms from previous areas".

Vindictus won awards at the 2010 Korea Game Awards for its planning/scenario, graphics, character, and sound while also receiving the "Popular Game Award" and "Grand Prize" for a total of 6 awards won.

== Sequels ==
A mobile MMORPG developed by Tiancity, luòqíyīngxióngchuán: Yǒnghéng, was released on 2 August 2017 for iOS and Android.

In February 2024, Nexon revealed Vindictus: Defying Fate, a new game developed in Unreal Engine. Defying Fate is an action RPG set in the same universe as Vindictus, and features returning characters from the original game including Lann and Fiona, the first two playable characters. The game had a public pre-alpha test one month later. It is set to be released for PlayStation 5 and Windows in 2027.
