= Dungeon & Fighter =

- Genre: Role-playing game
- Developer: Neople
- Publishers: Nexon; Tencent (mobile)
- Platforms: Microsoft Windows, Xbox 360, PlayStation 4, PlayStation 5, Nintendo Switch, Xbox Series X/S, iOS, Android
- First release: Dungeon Fighter Online; August 10, 2005
- Latest release: The First Berserker: Khazan; March 27, 2025

Dungeon & Fighter, sometimes abbreviated to DNF, is a series of video games created by Neople, a subsidiary of Nexon. While early games were only developed and published by Neople, Nexon began to publish other entries in the series as well as outsource the development to other companies.

== Games ==
Release timeline
2005	Dungeon Fighter Online
2006
2007
2008
2009
2010
2011
2012	Dungeon Fighter Live: Fall of Hendon Myre
2013
2014
2015
2016	Dungeon & Fighter: Spirit
2017
2018
2019
2020
2021
2022	Dungeon & Fighter Mobile; DNF Duel
2023
2024
2025	The First Berserker: Khazan

=== Dungeon & Fighter ===
Dungeon & Fighter, the first game in the series, was released for Microsoft Windows on August 10, 2005. The game is an online multiplayer side-scrolling beat 'em up that features multiple classes to choose from. The game underwent a name change when it was localized to other markets. In Japan, the game was renamed to Arad Senki while in the west it was titled Dungeon Fighter Online.

=== Dungeon Fighter Live: Fall of Hendon Myre ===
Dungeon Fighter Live: Fall of Hendon Myre was the first spin-off in the series and was released exclusively for the Xbox 360 on July 13, 2012, for the Xbox Live Arcade. The game offered the same gameplay as the original but with some added graphical upgrades to the sprites. It featured online co-op with up to 4 players who could drop in and drop out. The game had 3 playable classes. The game was delisted and removed from the Xbox Live Arcade marketplace in 2015.

=== Dungeon & Fighter: Spirit ===
Dungeon & Fighter: Spirit was the first mobile release of the series released in Korea in 2016. The game followed the same formula as the original with the game being a side-scrolling beat 'em up game but unlike the original game, Dungeon & Fighter: Spirit utilized 3D graphics instead of 2D sprites for the character models while much of the background was still in 2D. Shortly after its release, the game was shut down in 2017 in favor of releasing another mobile game in the series. There were plans to launch the game in Japan as Arad Senki Mobile but these were cancelled with the shutdown of the Korean version.

=== Dungeon & Fighter Mobile ===
Dungeon & Fighter Mobile is the second mobile entry in the series released on March 24, 2022. Just like previous games, it features the same side-scrolling gameplay but with the same 2D sprite graphics as previous entries. This game serves as a replacement for the previous entry, Dungeon & Fighter: Spirit.

=== DNF Duel ===
DNF Duel is a 2.5D fighting game co-developed by Arc System Works, Eighting, and Neople, and published by Nexon. The game was released on Windows, PlayStation 4, and PlayStation 5 on June 28, 2022, and Nintendo Switch on 28 April 2023. Two open betas for PlayStation platforms were hosted prior to release; the first from December 17 to December 20, 2021, and the second from April 1 to April 4, 2022.

=== The First Berserker: Khazan ===
In 2018, Nexon announced "Project BBQ", the working title for a 3D Dungeon Fighter Online video game. A gameplay video was revealed that December, demonstrating fast 3D action combat. A second trailer for "Project BBQ" was released in December 2020. The game was revealed with the full title Arad Chronicle: Khazan with a trailer at G-Star 2022. In 2023 the game was officially titled The First Berserker: Khazan with a trailer at The Game Awards 2023. A demo was available on January 16, 2025. The game was released on March 27, 2025, on PlayStation 5, Xbox Series, and Windows.

=== Upcoming games ===
==== Overkill ====
In April 2021, the upcoming Dungeon Fighter Overkill, also known as Dungeon & Fighter Overkill, was announced. The gameplay uses a 2.5D perspective and runs on the Unreal Engine 4.

==== Dungeon & Fighter: Arad ====
In January 2023, Nexon announced Project DW, the working title for a new open-world action role-playing game. In October 2024, the game was officially titled Dungeon & Fighter: Arad with a trailer at G-Star 2024.

== Other media ==
- Dungeon & Fighter
- Anime television series

Slap-up Party: Arad Senki
- Directed by: Takahiro Ikezoe; Lee Jin-hyung
- Produced by: Kim Bong-suk; Kenji Inoue; Kazuo Oonuki; Junichi Takagi
- Written by: Kazuki Yamanobe
- Music by: Takeshi Nakatsuka
- Studio: GK Entertainment; Gonzo
- Original network: TV Tokyo, TVh, TVQ, TV Aichi, TSC, TVO, AT-X
- Original run: April 3, 2009 – September 26, 2009
- Episodes: 26
- Manga

Arad Senki: Slap-up Party
- Written by: Kiku Ueda
- Published by: Gentosha
- Magazine: Monthly Comic Birz
- Original run: June 2009 – November 2009
- Volumes: 1
Further information
Original net animation
The Fate of Arad
Directed by	Masahiro Hosoda (chief); Hideaki Ooba
Produced by	Ma Xiaotie; Cheng Shi
Written by	Ken Takano
Studio	Dangun Pictures
Released	April 28, 2017 – September 1, 2017
Episodes	20
Original net animation
Arad Senki: The Wheel of Reversal
Directed by	Noriyuki Abe
Produced by	Yang Ming; Feng Sheng; Zhu Zhengrong; Zhang Ge; Eom Jeong-hyeon
Written by	Aoi Akashiro; Mayori Sekijima
Music by	Kenji Ito
Studio	Liden Films
Released	April 23, 2020 – July 30, 2020
Episodes	13 + 3 Specials
icon

=== Anime ===
An anime adaption of the game, titled as Slap-up Party: Arad Senki (スラップアップパーティ −アラド戦記−, Surappuappu Pāti -Arado Senki-; lit and titled in original Korean as Dungeon and Fighter: Slap-up Party (던전 앤 파이터 슬랩업 파티). Slap-up Party: Record of the Arad War), was produced by Gonzo and GK Entertainment and directed by Takahiro Ikezoe. The anime premiered on TV Tokyo on April 3, 2009, and ran for 26 episodes. It is loosely based on material from the official webcomic, The Vagrants in Arad (Korean: 아라드의 방랑파티, Japanese: アラドの放浪パーティー, lit. The Wandering Party of Arad), and features several of the same characters.

A new anime adaptation titled "Reversal of Fate S2" was produced by Liden Films, directed by Noriyuki Abe, and written by Mayori Sekijima and Aoi Akashiro. The series was set to premiere in 2019, but was delayed until its premiere on April 23, 2020.

Main voice cast:

- Takashi Kondō as Baron Abel
- Sakura Nogawa as Ryunmei Ranka
- Kenichi Suzumura as Capensis
- Ayumi Tsuji as Ixia Jun
- Takaya Kuroda as Jeda Raxpa
- Ryōtarō Okiayu as Irbek
- Rie Tanaka as Hiria
- Mitsuo Iwata as Harsen
- Akeno Watanabe as Roxy
- Shiro Tsubuyaki as Willy

The first opening theme of the anime, "Party Play" by Sakura Nogawa, and the ending theme "Hateshinai Sekai" (果てしない世界; lit. 'Endless World') by YMCK were used from episodes 1 to 13. From episodes 14 to 26, "Sokujin no Pandora" (塞塵のパンドラ; lit. 'The Pandora of Dust ') by Sakura Nogawa was the opening theme while "LEVEL∞" by Akiko Hasegawa became the ending theme from episodes 14 to 25.

=== Donghua ===
A donghua directed by Masahiro Hosoda and animated by Dangun Pictures premiered in 2017.

=== Manga ===
A manga based on the game titled Arad Senki: Slap-up Party (アラド戦記 −スラップアップパーティ−), written and illustrated by Kiku Ueda, premiered on May 30, 2009, in the June issue of Gentosha's Monthly Comic Birz magazine.
