= Kru Interactive =

Video game company

- Industry: Video game developer
- Founded: 1994
- Headquarters: Santa Clara, California
- Website: http://www.kru.com/

Kru Interactive (spun off from Nexon Co., Ltd) is a company that operates and manages online gaming and MMORPGs. Its headquarters is located in Santa Clara, California.

== KRU or Kru Interactive ==
The South Korea-based game company made a name for itself in the early 1990s. Nexon launched Nexus: The Kingdom of the Winds in 1998, and Dark Ages in 1999. Shattered Galaxy, the award winning and first massive online RTS game, was introduced in 2001. The company has recently expanded into other Asian countries, notably Japan, Malaysia, and Singapore; along with the United States. For a short time, Shattered Galaxy was sold in stores in the United States but never sold well because it was offered for free in a long-term open beta and then made available as a pay for play, only four months after commercial launch, from the Shattered Galaxy website. Shattered Galaxy has also been awarded the Seumas McNally Grand Prize, Audience Choice Awards, Technical Excellence Award, and Best Game Design at the 2001 Independent Games Festival Awards.

Nexon has also released a few unsuccessful games to the North American audience in beta form which have since been dropped. They include Elemental Saga, QuizQuiz and Elancia. QuizQuiz has since evolved into the exclusively Korean and Japanese online game Q-Play, while Elemental Saga was eventually cancelled. Nexon has several games exclusively available to Korean players such as Elancia and Crazy Arcade.
