= Microtransaction =

Video game business model

A microtransaction (MTX) video game business model is one where users can purchase in-game virtual goods with micropayments. Microtransactions are often used in free-to-play games to provide a revenue source for the developers. While microtransactions are a staple of the mobile app market, they are also seen on PC software such as Valve's Steam digital distribution platform, as well as console gaming.

Free-to-play games that include a microtransaction model are sometimes referred to as "freemium". Another term, "pay-to-win", is sometimes used pejoratively to refer to games where purchasing items in-game can give a player an advantage over other players, particularly if the items cannot be obtained through free means. The objective with a free-to-play microtransaction model is to involve more players in the game by providing desirable items or features that players can purchase if they lack the skill or available time to earn these through regular game play. Also, presumably the game developer's marketing strategy is that in the long term, the revenue from a micro transaction system will outweigh the revenue from a one-time-purchase game.

Loot boxes are another form of microtransactions. Through purchasing a loot box, the player acquires a seemingly random assortment of items. Loot boxes result in high revenues because instead of a one-time purchase for the desired item, users may have to buy multiple boxes. This method has also been called a form of underage gambling. A study in 2020 found that 58% of games on Google Play Store and 59% of games on the Apple App store contained loot boxes, Features available by microtransaction can range from cosmetic (such as decorative character attire) to functional (such as weapons and items). Some games allow players to purchase items that can be acquired through normal means, but some games include items that can only be obtained through microtransaction. Some developers ensure that only cosmetic items are accessible this way to keep gameplay fair and stable.

The reasons why people, especially children, continue to pay for microtransactions are embedded in human psychology. There has been considerable discussion over microtransactions and their effects on children, as well as regulation and legislation efforts. Microtransactions are most commonly provided through a custom store interface placed inside the app for which the items are being sold. Apple and Google both provide frameworks for initiating and processing transactions, and both take 30 percent of all revenue generated by microtransactions sold through in-app purchases in their respective app stores.

== History ==
Initially, microtransactions in games took the form of exchanging real-life money for the virtual currency used in the game that the user was playing. The arcade game Double Dragon 3: The Rosetta Stone (1990) has shops where players can insert coins to purchase upgrades, power-ups, health, weapons, special moves, and player characters.

The microtransaction revenue model gained popularity in South Korea with the success of Nexon's online free-to-play games, starting with QuizQuiz (1999), followed by games such as MapleStory (2003), Mabinogi (2004), and Dungeon Fighter Online (2004).

Notable examples of games that used this model in the early 2000s include the social networking site Habbo Hotel (2001), developed by the Finnish company Sulake, and Linden Lab's 2003 virtual world game Second Life. Both free games allow users to customize the clothing and style of their characters; buy and collect furniture; and purchase special, "flashy" animations to show off to others using some type of virtual currency. Habbo Hotel uses three different kinds of currency: Credits (or coins), Duckets (which are earned through accomplishing specific achievements during gameplay), and Diamonds. Diamonds are only obtained through buying Credits with real-life money. In Second Life, the Linden Dollar (L$) is the virtual currency used to power the game's internal economy. L$ can be bought with real money through a marketplace developed by Linden Lab themselves, LindeX. Second Life in particular has generated massive amounts of economic activity and profits for both Linden Lab and Second Life's users. In September 2005, $3,596,674 worth of transactions were processed on the platform. Both games are still active today.

The content of the "Horse Armor" package was generally seen as meager, inspiring some to complain of its US$2.50 price.

The Elder Scrolls IV: Oblivion was released in March 2006 by Bethesda Softworks. From April 2006 onwards, Bethesda began releasing small, downloadable packages of content from their website and over the Xbox Live Marketplace, for the equivalent of between one and three US dollars. The first package, a set of horse armor (barding) for Oblivion's steeds, was released on April 3, 2006, costing 200 Marketplace points, equivalent to US$2.50 or £1.50; the corresponding PC release cost was US$1.99. Bethesda offered no rationale for the price discrepancy. These were not the first Oblivion-related Marketplace releases (the first was a series of dashboard themes and picture packs released prior to Oblivion's publication, in February 2006, for a nominal fee) nor were they entirely unexpected: Bethesda had previously announced their desire to support the Xbox release with downloadable Marketplace content, and other publishers had already begun to release similar packages for their games, at similar prices. A November 2005-release of a "Winter Warrior Pack" for Kameo: Elements of Power was also priced at 200 Marketplace points, and similar content additions had been scheduled for Project Gotham Racing 3 and Perfect Dark Zero. Indeed, Marketplace content additions formed a significant part of a March 2006 Microsoft announcement regarding the future of Xbox Live. "Downloadable in-game content is a main focus of Microsoft's strategy heading into the next-gen console war", stated one GameSpot reporter. "With more consoles on their way to retail, 80 games available by June, and new content and experiences coming to Xbox Live all the time, there has never been a better time to own an Xbox 360", announced Peter Moore. Nonetheless, although Xbox Live Arcade games, picture packs, dashboards and profile themes continued to be a Marketplace success for Microsoft, the aforementioned in-game content remained sparse. Pete Hines asserted, "We were the first ones to do downloadable content like that – some people had done similar things, but no one had really done additions where you add new stuff to your existing game." There was no pressure from Microsoft to make the move.

The horse armor content sold relatively poorly, ranking ninth out of ten in DLC sales for Oblivion by 2009. Despite this, Oblivion's horse armor became a model for many games that followed for implementing microtransactions in video games, and is considered the first primary example and often synonymous for microtransactions.

In June 2008 Electronic Arts introduced an online Store for The Sims 2. It allowed players to purchase points that can be spent on in-game items. The Store has also been a part of The Sims 3 since the game's release. In The Sims 4 Electronic Arts removed the ability to buy single items, instead downloadable content is provided exclusively via expansion packs.

In the late 2000s and early 2010s, games like Facebook's FarmVille (2009), Electronic Arts's The Simpsons: Tapped Out (2012) and Supercell's Clash of Clans (2012) pioneered a new approach to implanting microtransactions into games. In conjunction with having virtual currency be used to purchase items, tools, furniture, and animals, these mobile games made it so users can purchase currency and then use that currency to reduce or eliminate the wait times attached to certain actions, like planting and growing carrots or collecting taxes from the townspeople.

In March 2009 the Ultimate Team game mode was introduced in FIFA 09 in which gamers can buy "packs" containing items such as players, stadiums and contract extensions with currency earned by playing the game or real world money. EA followed this success by introducing the game mode to Madden NFL beginning with Madden NFL 10 in January 2010. In March 2014 EA marked the fifth anniversary of Ultimate Team and shared statistics showing the explosive growth in popularity of the game mode. By the late 2010s, Ultimate Team was generating billions of dollars every year.

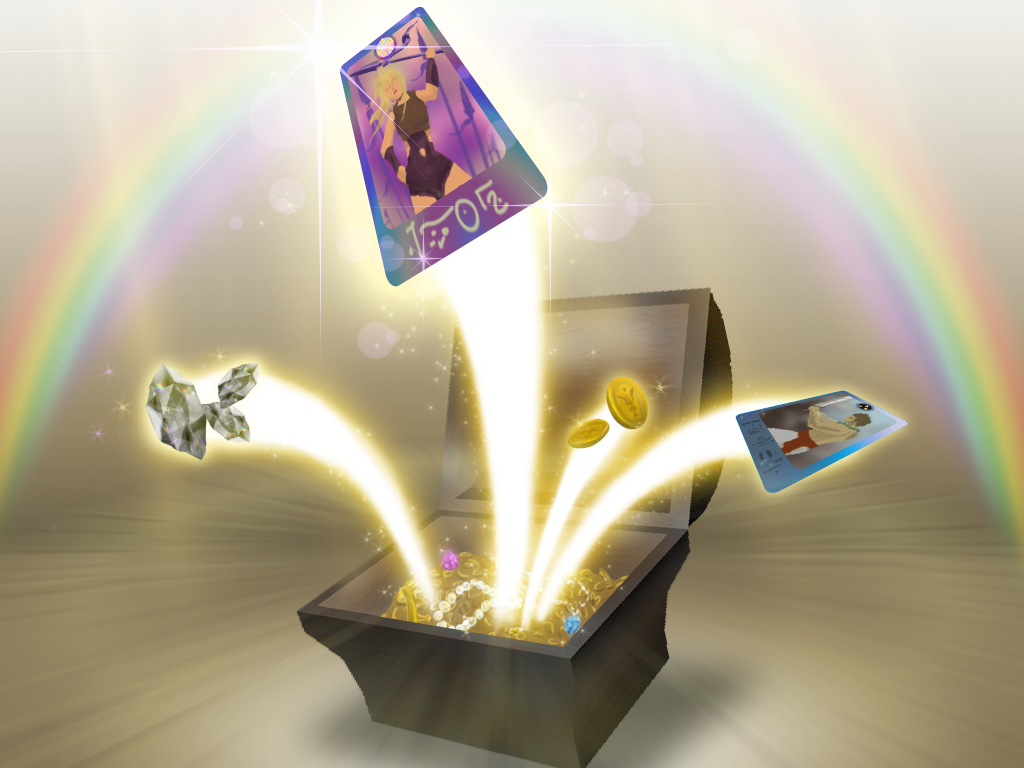
Mock-up image of opening a loot box in a video game

From around 2017, another major transition in how microtransactions are implemented in games occurred. "Live-service" games, like Epic Games's Fortnite, with constantly changing and updating content, became more prevalent in the video game market. These types of games heavily employ the use of the loot box microtransaction type. According to the September 2019 report by the UK Parliament's House of Commons and the Digital, Culture, Media and Sport Committee, they define loot boxes as "... items in video games that may be bought for real-world money, but which provide players with a randomised reward of uncertain value." The widespread usage of loot boxes by game developers and publishers have garnered a great amount of criticism from gamers in the past decade. Game developing corporations, like Electronic Arts (EA) and Activision Blizzard, make billions of dollars through the purchase of their microtransactions. In FY2017, EA raked in around $1.68 billion and Activision Blizzard earned over $4 billion respectively.

The aforementioned Fortnite is an example of a microtransaction model in which all purchases are solely cosmetic: players can choose to purchase "skins" (cosmetic changes to the way characters, weapons, and vehicles look) to show off to other players. However, a player can experience all the content of the game and be on an even playing field without purchasing any microtransactions because no feature or gameplay-affecting piece of content is locked behind a payment. These games still occasionally take accusations of being "pay-to-win" as combat-focused video games, such as Apex Legends or Call of Duty: Warzone, offer skins that are inspired by real-world military equipment – often including camouflage – which technically can give players an advantage by obscuring them to human opponents.

== Impact ==
Mobile web analytics company Flurry reported on July 7, 2011, that based on its research, the revenue from free-to-play games had overtaken revenue from premium games that earn revenue through traditional means in Apple's App Store, for the top 100 grossing games when comparing the results for the months of January and June 2011. It used data that it analyzed through 90,000 apps that installed the company's software in order to roughly determine the amount of revenue generated by other popular apps. They discovered that free games represented 39% of the total revenue from January, and that the number jumped to 65% by June, helped in part by the fact that over 75% of the 100 top grossing apps are games. This makes free-to-play the single most dominant business model in the mobile apps industry. They also learned that the number of people that spend money on in-game items in free-to-play games ranges from 0.5% to 6%, depending on a game's quality and mechanics. Even though this means that a large number of people will never spend money in a game, it also means that the people that do spend money could amount to a sizeable number because the game was given away for free.

A later study found that over 92% of revenue generated on Android and iOS in 2013 came from free-to-play games such as Candy Crush Saga.

Electronic Arts Corporate Vice-President Peter Moore speculated in June 2012 that within 5 to 10 years, all games will have transitioned to the microtransaction model. Tommy Palm of King (Candy Crush Saga) expressed in 2014 his belief that all games will eventually be free-to-play. According to Ex-BioWare developer Manveer Heir in a 2017 interview, microtransactions have become a factor in what types of games are planned for production.

Free-to-play coupled with microtransactions may be used as a response to piracy. An example of this is the mobile game Dead Trigger switching to a free-to-play model due to a high rate of piracy. While microtransactions are considered a more robust and difficult to circumnavigate than digital rights management, in some cases they can be circumvented. In 2012, a server was created by a Russian developer, which provided falsified authentication for iOS in-app purchases. This allowed users to obtain features requiring a microtransaction without paying.

Consumer organizations have criticized that some video games do not describe adequately that these purchases are made with real currency rather than virtual currency. Also, some platforms do not require passwords to finalize a microtransaction. This has resulted in consumers getting unexpectedly high bills, often referred to as a "bill shock".

== Criticism and regulation ==
In the mid and late 2010s, people became increasingly aware of how microtransactions operate in games, and they have become much more critical of their usage. The commonly cited issues of microtransactions from gamers are:

- Loot box rewards are determined by random chance and percentages, plus they can directly influence gameplay via the items they bestow.
- They sometimes cost too much money for what they are worth. For example, a bundle of 50 loot boxes in Blizzard's first-person shooter game Overwatch costs $39.99.
- They may facilitate gambling behaviours in people already suffering from gambling issues. Plus, they can make people overspend money on the game, whether or not they are able to do so.
- Games with loot boxes, like FIFA, can become "pay-to-win" (in order to advance past certain points, or to become the best in the game, it is virtually required to pay real money to receive in-game currency to purchase items or to pay for bigger and better items directly).
- Microtransactions in games that are not free-to-play means that gamers are paying more money after already paying to experience the full game.

=== Legislative efforts to regulate microtransactions ===
The implementation of microtransactions and the subsequent backlash from gamers and the gaming media have caused governments from all around the world to look into these games and their microtransaction mechanics. In April 2018, the Netherlands and Belgium banned the sale of microtransactions in games sold in their countries. The specific games Belgium looked closer at were EA's Star Wars Battlefront II (2017) and FIFA 18, Overwatch, and Counter-Strike: Global Offensive developed by Valve. All of those game's microtransactions, except for Star Wars Battlefront II which removed their gameplay-altering microtransactions in March 2018 (but kept cosmetic microtransactions) due to players calculating that it would take over 48 hours of playing to obtain Luke Skywalker and then complaining about this extreme threshold to unlock popular characters to EA, have been determined to be "games of chance" by the Belgian government. As such, they are highly regulated by the Belgian government under their gambling laws.

Games would have to remove their microtransactions in order for it to be sold in their country. If the game companies don't comply, then Belgium's government said that it will enact "a prison sentence of up to 5 years and a fine of up to 800,000 euros". While most game publishers agreed to modify their games' loot boxes in accordance with governmental laws, or otherwise as a result of negative reactions, others, such as Electronic Arts, have contested that they do not constitute as gambling. However, EA eventually complied with the Belgian government's declaration and made it so players in Belgium can not purchase FIFA Points, the premium (obtained by buying it with real money) in-game currency used in FIFA's "Ultimate Team" game mode. Professional FIFA players in Belgium were disappointed because not being able to buy FIFA Points makes it harder for them to compete and succeed in the FIFA Global Series and the EA-sponsored e-sports competition for FIFA games, showing just how "pay-to-win" they feel FIFA Ultimate Team is.

In the United States, there have been some calls to introduce legislation to regulate microtransactions in video games, whether on mobile, consoles, or PC, and numerous attempts have been made recently to pass such legislation. In November 2017, Hawaii representatives Chris Lee and Sean Quinlan, during a news conference, explained how loot boxes and microtransactions prey on children and that they are working to introduce bills into their state's house and senate. A few months later, in February 2018, they successfully put four bills onto the floor of Hawaii State Legislature. Two of those bills would make it so games containing loot boxes can not be sold to people under the age of 21, and the other two would force game publishers to put labels on the case of their games that have loot boxes in them, as well as make them be transparent about the item drop rates for the rewards in their game's loot boxes. However, all four bills failed to pass through the Hawaii State Legislature in March 2018. In May 2019, Republican Senator Josh Hawley of Missouri introduced a bill named "The Protecting Children from Abusive Games Act" to ban loot boxes and pay-to-win microtransactions in games played by minors, using similar conditions previously outlined in the Children's Online Privacy Protection Act. The bill received some bi-partisan support in the form of two co-sponsors from Democrats Richard Blumenthal of Connecticut and Ed Markey of Massachusetts.

The United Kingdom has also been closely observing microtransactions, especially loot boxes, and their effects on children. A major report by the UK Parliament's House of Commons and the Digital, Culture, Media, and Sport Committee, released in September 2019, called for the banning or regulation of microtransactions and loot boxes to children as well as having the games industry to take up more responsibility with regards to protecting players from the harms of microtransactions that simulate gambling. Specifically, the committee's conclusion is that microtransactions should be classified as gambling in the UK and therefore subject to current gambling and age-restriction laws. In October 2019, the Children's Commissioner for England, which promotes and protects children's rights, released a report describing the experiences, thoughts, and effects, positive and negative, of gaming on children ages 10–16. Within the report, some of the children directly stated to the interviewers that the microtransactions and loot boxes that they encounter and subsequently buy, are just like gambling. The report concludes that showing the odds and percentages of certain microtransactions to players does not go far enough and does not actually solve the problem.

Instead, they suggest that certain new features to protect children should be implemented in all games featuring microtransactions, like showing the all-time spending on a child's in-game account and having limits on the amount someone can spend daily. Additionally, they push for game developers and publishers to stop pressuring children to spend money on microtransactions in their games in order to progress through the game and for Parliament to change their current gambling laws to declare loot boxes as gambling and subject to gambling laws.

== Psychology and ethics ==
Alongside questioning the legality of the extensive use of microtransactions, some gamers have also questioned the morality and ethics of selling microtransactions, especially to children. Researchers have studied the natural psychology behind both the selling and purchase of microtransactions.

=== Psychology ===
According to a post made by Gabe Duverge on the Touro University Worldwide (TUW) website, impulse buying is a significant part of the psychology behind people buying microtransactions. Essentially, many games, especially in the realm of mobile games and the "free-to-play" market, force a decision from the player to keep playing or not via a limited time pop-up on the screen that tells them that if they pay a certain amount of money (usually about 99 cents or a dollar), they can keep playing where they left off. This is another type of microtransaction and it has become increasingly common in the mobile games sphere as of late. Another psychological aspect that is used to get players to continue playing and buying microtransactions is called loss aversion. When a player continues to lose over and over again, they begin to crave the dopamine-filled, positive feelings that they feel when they win. As such, they become more inclined to spend money for items that will help them achieve that elusive win. Then when they do win, the player attributes their win with the item that they just bought, making it more likely that they will spend money whenever the player gets on a losing streak, and so the cycle continues on.

=== Ethics of selling microtransactions to children ===
During the past two decades, gaming has emerged as one of the top options children go to as a means of alleviating boredom. In an August 2019 report conducted by Parent Zone in the UK, they studied and gathered data directly from children between the ages of 10–16 years old about their experiences with online gaming and the microtransactions that the games that they play hold, as well as ask about how the microtransactions in these games have affected them (and/or their parents) socially and financially. A growing number of parents of children aged 5 to 15 years old are now concerned that their children could be pressured to perform microtransactions online.

==== Statistics ====
According to the Parent Zone study, in the United Kingdom, 97% of males and 90% of females aged 10–16 years old play video games. About 93% of people 10–16 years old in the United Kingdom have played video games, with many playing games that utilize an Internet connection. Many online games targeting younger audiences may include microtransactions. The primary items bought by children in these games are largely cosmetic items, specifically "skins", which modify the appearance of the in-game player.

In the case of Fortnite, many of the outfits and other cosmetics are locked behind a "battle pass" that the player must pay for. A "battle pass" is a tiered system where the player buys the pass and must unlock the tiers on their own. By completing challenges and other missions, they earn in-game items like outfits, emotes (special animations used to taunt opponents, celebrate victories, dance, and show-off), and other cosmetics. It is about $9.50 (or 950 of Fortnite's in-game virtual currency, V-Bucks), but the player can also pay about $28 (or 2,800 V-Bucks) instead to unlock the battle pass and they automatically complete the first 25 tiers (out of 100 tiers) of it.

A majority of the children surveyed feel that these kinds of microtransaction systems in their online games are complete rip-offs. 76% of them also believe that these online games purposely try to squeeze as much money as possible from them when they play the game. About half of the children expressed that they need to spend money on the game in order for it to be fun to them; this is due to many of these games' features, which are modes that the children want to play and experience, being locked behind microtransaction paywalls. As such, there is a large gap between the gaming experiences that non-paying players have and the experiences that paying players have.

Some other statistics and thoughts regarding loot boxes specifically were also collected from the children. Out of the 60% of children that know about loot boxes, a majority (91%) stated that the online games they play contain loot boxes in them, 59% of them would rather pay for in-game content individually and directly instead of through a collective and randomized loot box, and 44% believe that if loot boxes were eliminated from their online games the games would actually be a lot better. Plus, 40% of the children who played a game with loot boxes in them paid for one, too. Overall, the report stated that of the children who were generally unhappy with the games they paid for or were gifted, 18% felt that way because certain features had to be bought after paying for the game already, effectively making is so they had to pay more than the normal, full-price of the game in order to play the full game. The game was simply just not worth paying for to 35% of the unsatisfied children and 18% of them also felt that in-game microtransactions were not worth paying for either. Ultimately, children feel that spending money on microtransactions has become the norm and an expectation when playing modern video games.

===== Social =====
For many children, the excitement felt when opening loot boxes, packs, and obtaining items through microtransactions is very addictive. Opening these random boxes without knowing what is inside, to them, is similar to opening a present. The excitement and suspense is amplified when the experience is felt alongside friends. In the UK Children's Commissioner's report, the children who played FIFA feel that opening player packs are a game within the game. To them, opening packs creates variety because they can play some football games in the Ultimate Team game mode and then open some packs when they get bored of playing normal football matches.

Children might want to fit in by paying for microtransactions and loot boxes and obtaining very rare items in front of their friends, creating a lot of hype and excitement among them. This makes paying for microtransactions a very positive experience for them. However, when children buy items in front of their friends, peer pressure often set in. Friends pressuring the player to continue buying packs hoping that they will be able to see them get a rare item can cause the player to spend more than they may actually be able to. The pressure to spend money on in-game content also stems from children seeing their friends have these special, rare items, and them wanting to have it themselves. Essentially, when everyone around them has it, they will want it too in order to feel like a part of the group.

Peer pressure is not the only way children's social gaming experiences are altered. As noted in both the Parent Zone report and the Children's Commissioner's assessment, children who play Fortnite, explained that classism, as in discrimination against people of different economic and social classes, exists among the players of the game. Some children fear that if they have the free 'default' skin in Fortnite, no one, friends nor random strangers, will want to play with them as the default skin is seen as a symbol of a player being bad at the game. The default skin is used as judgement and an insult against the player whose in-game avatar wears it, too. Players wearing default skins are considered 'financially poor' and very 'uncool' by their peers and the game's community, so children spend money on microtransactions in order to avoid having that 'tag' or target on them.

The media that children consume outside of the game can also affect their social interactions and in-game spending. A popular mode of entertainment for children is watching YouTube videos of other people playing their favorite games. In the case of FIFA, children may watch a popular YouTubers constantly open player packs in the Ultimate Team game mode; unlike the children, the said content creators have the money to pay for the packs, due to YouTube being their major source of income.

===== Financial =====
The amount of money that children spend on microtransactions has continued to grow because the design of these online games, as well as other outside influences, have made spending money for in-game content an essential aspect of the game itself. In the UK, different cases of children unknowingly spending money from their parents and their own in order to get what they want or need to progress through the game have surfaced. In one instance, the father of a family with four children all under 10 years old, bought an £8 FIFA Ultimate Team player pack for them. In the span of three weeks, the children kept spending money on packs, eventually spending £550 ($709.91) altogether, completely emptying their parents' bank account, but never receiving one of the best players in the game as well as the children's favorite player: Lionel Messi.

The children apologized to their parents and explained that at the time they did not understand how much they were impacting the family's financial situation. There have been other situations where UK children spent £700 ($903.53), £1,000 ($1290.75), £2,000 ($2581.50), and even £3,160 ($4078.77) on microtransactions in various mobile games, usually as a result of them getting tricked by the game to pay for something in-game or just not understanding that real money was being taken out of their, or their parents', bank accounts when they bought items in-game. Spending such large amounts of money on microtransactions have devastated some families financially, including some who had to pay a bill full of microtransaction payments with college savings and even money in life savings accounts.

In the Children's Commissioner's study, children reported spending more and more money with each coming year, despite also feeling that because they are rewarded completely unknown items, they feel like they may be wasting money, too. One of the children that played FIFA in the study said that they spend anywhere from £10 ($12.91) a day to upwards of £300 ($387.23) in one year, sometimes even buying multiple player packs at one time. Some children have also stated that they have seen friends, their siblings, and acquaintances who have mental disorders spend all of their birthday money on in-game microtransactions, all while feeling like spending that money has not been a waste despite them not receiving any valuable items.

== Data ==
Microtransactions have become increasingly common in many types of video games. Smartphone, console, and PC games all have conformed to the use of microtransactions due to its high profitability. Many companies and games, especially smartphone games, have taken on a business model that offer their games for free and then relying purely on the success of microtransactions to turn a profit.

=== Ethics ===
The collection of this data on consumers, although technically legal in the United States, or outside the EU, can be considered unethical. Companies can sell data about consumers, involving their spending, bank information, and preferences, to understand the consumer better overall, making business models for gaming companies safer and more profitable. With microtransactions under a negative spotlight from the gaming community, there may be displeasure from those who are aware that their data is being shared to make microtransactions possible.

=== Revenue ===
Data from a variety of sources show that microtransactions can vastly increase a company's profits. Three free-to-play mobile games that made heavy use of the practice, Clash Royale, Clash of Clans, and Game of War, were all in the top five most profitable mobile games of 2016. Microtransactions are also used in larger budget games as well, such as Grand Theft Auto Online (2013) generating more revenue through them than retail sales by the end of 2017. This trend was consistent with many other popular games at the time, leading to the practice being widespread in the 2010s. In its 2021 fiscal year, Activision Blizzard earned $8.8 billion, with the majority of profit generated from microtransactions.

== See also ==
- Pay-to-play
- Gacha game
