= Shattered Galaxy =

2001 video game

- Developer: Kru Interactive
- Publisher: Tri Synergy
- Platform: Windows
- Release: August 22, 2001
- Genre: Massively multiplayer online real-time strategy
- Mode: Multiplayer

Shattered Galaxy is a massively multiplayer online real-time strategy game (MMORTS) that was released in 2001 by KRU Interactive, now known as Nexon Inc., after an extensive open beta period. In the US, it was published by Tri Synergy. It combines the attributes of a massive multiplayer online role-playing game and a real-time strategy game. Having won the Seumas McNally Grand Prize at the 2001 Independent Games Festival and hosted through the Game Developers Conference, the game has been commercially unsuccessful due in large part to its dated graphics engine. The game was published under the name Tactical Commanders in South Korea, published by Nexon until December 31, 2005. This game has also been serviced in Japan, Taiwan, and Germany.

== Plot ==
Shattered Galaxy is set in a post-apocalyptic future. A teleportation device was found buried on Earth's surface, though scientists were not able to master its secrets. Various non-living substances were successfully sent through and retrieved, but when a common rat was inserted into the portal, it activated the artifact in an unexpected way: the device immediately teleported itself, as well as all matter in a 2000 kilometer wide radius around it, to the planet Morgana Prime. The player is one of the survivors of this incident. The planet itself was devoid of sentient life, but robotic war machines were found on its surface, and humans have since learned to control them telepathically (allowing the humans themselves to stay out of harm's way). Humans have since expanded to another planet (server) in the Morgana system, Relic, where wars likewise rage.

== Gameplay ==
Shattered Galaxy consists of two interrelated and different gameplay aspects: The RPG side has the player in control of an avatar which can buy units, upgrades, and special abilities as well as visit other provinces and buildings such as simulators, HQ's, and Portals to other planets. It is through this Avatar that the player joins or starts battles with other players, simply by walking into a province not controlled by the player's nation. As soon as the avatar enters any province controlled by an opposing faction battle is commenced and the "RTS" aspect of gameplay is engaged.

Though described as an MMORTS, Shattered Galaxy's gameplay is closer in flavor to a real-time tactics game. During battle, instead of commanding an entire war machine including infrastructure, supplies and resources, players are given control of a single squad (of 6 to 12 units at time) which they control alongside as many as 20+ teammates. A persistent reinforcement system allows players on both sides of a battle to join or retreat at any point up to the last 3 minutes of each fifteen-minute battle. Likewise, battles do not center around the destruction of the opponent's base or units, but rather around control points, of which there will be three to five per battle. These "Points Of Contention" (POCs), represented by dodecagon, are captured by occupying them for a certain period of time (ranging from 45 to 90 seconds). The consequences of capturing a POC are dependent on the type of battle involved in, the time left in the battle, and the number of other POCs currently controlled. A "poccer" is a player or unit that captures a POC. "Poccing" refers to the actual act of taking a POC.

== Development ==
As of September 2008, the game can be played using a basic account at no charge with a few minor handicaps or upgraded to an elite account at a cost of US$9.95 per month to play with all limitations removed.

Nexon has closed Tactical Commanders' service in Korea, Japan, and Taiwan. As of October 2008, the German service was closed due to lack of players.

== Reception ==
Reception

Aggregate score
Aggregator	Score
Metacritic	79/100

Review scores
Publication	Score
Computer Gaming World	2/5
Game Informer	8/10
GameRevolution	B−
GameSpot	8/10
GameSpy	77%
GameZone	8/10
IGN	8/10
Next Generation	3/5
PC Gamer (US)	64%

John Lee for Next Generation gave it three stars out of five and called it a "decent" persistent online game that requires a teamwork.

The game received "generally favorable reviews" according to the review aggregation website Metacritic.

Shattered Galaxy was a runner-up for The Electric Playground's "Best Independent PC Game" prize, but lost to Serious Sam: The First Encounter.
