= Dark Ages (1999 video game) =

1999 fantasy MMORPG video game

- Developers: Nexon; KRU Interactive
- Designers: US version: David Ethan Kennerly; Korean version / server architecture: Nexon
- Engine: Based on the Nexon DOOMVAS architecture
- Platform: Microsoft Windows
- Release: 2 August 1999
- Genre: Fantasy MMORPG
- Mode: Multiplayer

Dark Ages is an MMORPG based on Celtic mythology, originally developed by Nexon and now operated by KRU Interactive. It is loosely based on the Korean game Legend of Darkness (Korean: 어둠의 전설). The American version was developed by David Ethan Kennerly who based it somewhat on the works of horror writer H. P. Lovecraft (in particular, on The Dream Quest of Unknown Kadath). The game originally thrived on player involvement in the management of the game and progression of the storyline, even going so far as allowing players control over in-game politics and laws

In 2003, the add-on Dark Ages: Medenia was released. In 2020, a major update for Dark Ages was revealed, featuring an upgraded game engine, enhanced resolutions (up to 1024 x 576), and various gameplay improvements.

== Gameplay ==
The view in Dark Ages is isometric except when leaving certain zones. Zones will either link to another zone at specific points, or else lead to a world map. When a player leaves a zone and goes onto the world map the player will click map points to change location to a new zone. Some zones may only be clicked by approaching from other specific zones, giving movement a feel of travel. Combat occurs in real-time, usually in specific hunting grounds.

Players choose a character class which can be upgraded through play. Much of the focus of gameplay is combat either in hunting grounds or in certain specific player versus player (PvP) areas. There are numerous hunting grounds in Dark Ages. Many hunting grounds are designed for specific character or ability levels. They may have a broad or narrow range and may exclude characters above or below the thresholds of entry.

One of the other unique features of Dark Ages created by David Ethan Kennerly is the political system. Originally only two towns - Rucesion and Mileth - were involved in the player-run politics, but later the separate in-game continent of Medenia has also developed a player-run politic of its own. An update to the game in 2017 reduced clout requirements to hold political office. Clout is a meta-currency stored on a character's legend, and is gained through other players "voting", which can be done once per 12 hours, or through winning a contest.

There is a contest system in Dark Ages. The players enter works of literature or art as a contest entry, to be judged by previous winners. The game developers make the final decision on what exclusive content is awarded. Players gain in-game rewards after winning a contest. Winners may also form new guilds and judge new contest entries upon becoming a noble.

== Expositional lore ==
In a long past era, the people called Tuatha de Danaan ("Children of Danaan") arrived in the lands of Temuair, meaning Earth-Sea in the Tuathan tongue. A civilization formed there called Hy-brasyl. It was a peaceful time, in harmony with nature. For the first time, after a millennium of peace had existed, a man is found murdered, and exploration into the outside world begins. With this comes the harnessing of the elements for magical power.

Along with this exploration, Kadath, the worldly home of the gods, is discovered. Dark altars and temples are constructed, and the priests of these dark gods go mad in their search for divine knowledge. In this madness, Hy-brasyl is drowned, causing the death of all those who know the forbidden knowledge.

Over 300 years go by until the knowledge is regained, and along with the four other elements (Fire, Earth, Water, Wind), a fifth is discovered: Darkness. With this discovery come the Dubhaimid, the dark ones. Formed by the Dark God Chadul, these dark forces terrorize Temuair. The wise amongst the Tuatha de Danaan return to the worship of the Light Goddess Danaan, who enters into the Great War with Chadul.

Many years later, the Six Lords of Temuair meet to form an unholy Pact with Chadul. Led by Tenes, King of Ardmagh, the Anaman Pact is formed, granting each of the Lords a 1000-year lifespan and the unity of Temuair. In the ensuing war, Danaan's chosen Paladin, Ainmeal, fights against Tenes in battle and wins, ending another dark threat. Ainmeal renames Ardmagh to "Loures".

Again much time of peace passes, until the 4th Empress of Loures, Ealagad, comes to power. She seeks to rekindle the power of Chadul and does so, restoring the Dubhaimid to Temuair. Danaan again intervenes, this time by sacrificing Herself in order to defeat Chadul for the final time. With the end of this Shadows War, the first of the Aislings (Dreamers) are born, free from their old mundane life, and making a difference in the new Atavism Age.

== Revival ==
On May 30, 2025, a YouTuber called Bind inspected the game as a player using an archaeogaming framework, where they shared their experiences playing what they considered to be a dead game. After publication, the video went viral, amassing well over 5 million views. This brought upon a revival of new players downloading and experiencing the game for the first time in decades. Anecdotal reports say that the game had 800 max concurrent players, and was maintaining a concurrent player population around 400 at any given time.

After the release, Kru Interactive acknowledged the video on their public Twitter. They have since continued to push and extend regular content updates for the game, continuing to manage the game going further with the upsurge in interest.
