= ArcheAge =

2013 video game

- Developer: XL Games
- Publishers: KOR: XL Games; EU/NA: Kakao Games
- Director: Jake Song
- Engine: CryEngine 3
- Platform: Microsoft Windows
- Release: KOR: 15 January 2013; EU/NA: 16 September 2014
- Genre: MMORPG
- Mode: Multiplayer

ArcheAge is an MMORPG developed by Korean developer Jake Song (former developer of Lineage) and his development company, XL Games. The game was released in Korea on January 15, 2013, and in Europe and North America on September 16, 2014. ArcheAge is described as a "sandpark" MMORPG, which the developers say is a hybrid of the open content style of a "sandbox" game and the more structured play experience of a "themepark" game. A sequel, ArcheAge Chronicles (formerly ArcheAge 2), was announced on September 24, 2024, as part of September PlayStation State of Play.

On April 25, 2024, Kakao Games announced that Archeage servers in North America and Europe would close effective June 27, 2024.

== Development ==
Initial development of ArcheAge began in 2006, and closed testing of the game took place over two years. Before finally being released in Korea on January 15, 2013, the game went through five closed beta tests and one open beta test. In 2012, an XL Games studio representative said he expected ArcheAge to be released in North America towards the end of 2013, or the beginning of 2014. In 2014 a newly hired CM stated the game will be transitioning into beta phase and will release for North America and the EU in 2014. Announcements made in July, indicate the launch of the beta phase for July 17, 2014. On April 24, 2014, Trion began to offer founder packs, for early alpha and beta access.

=== Game updates ===
On April the 28th 2015, Trion launched an extensive content patch (1.7), called The Dread Prophecies. The new content patch features new zones, ship customization, and modifications for more realistic sea combat. On September 12-13th, Trion launched the next content update patch (2.0), called Heroes Awaken. The new content features a new Heroes system in which players elect each other once a month to represent their faction. Along with the content update, several servers were merged.

== Gameplay ==
Typical in-game scenery with player using a glider (upper right corner)

ArcheAge features a zoneless world with first or third person view.

=== Combat ===
In addition to traditional combat settings, ArcheAge offers naval combat in such settings where players have to secure trade routes or engage in sea-land battles. Ships need to be built and equipped with weaponry and manpower and fights can be between players or against sea monsters.

==== Player vs player (PvP) ====
Many of the game zones allow for open world PvP. Players can freely attack other players who are members of the other factions (East, West or Pirate). Intra-faction PvP is possible if one player flags for 'bloodlust' mode; the player flagging and attacking in this manner will generate crime evidence and can face jail time. Several regular world events also promote open world PvP, such as the Halcyona War and the Abyssal Attack.

=== Crafting ===
The crafting system in ArcheAge is extensive, allowing crafting of, among other things, equipment, food, vehicles, and furniture for the player-owned homes. Crafting grants players "proficiency" levels, which unlock new crafting options.

=== Housing ===
The housing system allows players to construct buildings in designated, non-instanced zones throughout the world using a free-placement method. These buildings allow players to decorate their interiors/exteriors with both cosmetic and functional furnishings. Housing options range from small one-story cottages to large three-story mansions with their sizes directly affecting the amount of space required to place their foundations. Players must pay taxes on the land where they place their houses or run the risk of having them destroyed and losing some or all of the possessions therein. Most houses have a small area surrounding them that serves as space for farming.

By purifying an Archeum Crystal on the northern continent of Auroria, player guilds can claim land upon which to construct castles. These castles grant lordship over the surrounding area with taxes paid on the property within being collectable periodically by the guild's leader. A castle's primary focus is the defense of the Archeum Crystal during sieges. Should the Archeum Crystal be overtaken, the attacking guild gains ownership of the Crystal and the surrounding castle.

Land ownership is limited to "Patron" status holders. While the simplest manner to attain Patron status is to pay the subscription fee to Trion, free players can use in-game gold to purchase "Apex," a type of coin sold by Trion for $10 to paying players, but freely tradable within the game. Apex can be used to purchase patron status, enabling free players to own land without paying Trion directly.

==== Farming ====
After completing a quest early in a character's development, the ability to place a garden is obtained through the use of a scarecrow design. Further along in the character's development, a larger farm design becomes available. Using these designs, players are capable of claiming plots of land, typically in designated areas, where they can choose to raise a variety of plant and animal life. Only the owner of a farm, or those given permission by the owner, may access the farm and manage its contents. Players may also choose to plant their crops/trees/livestock in the open world but run the risk of other players stealing the contents, for which the transgressing player may receive crime points and eventually stand trial.

Each plant or animal has a set length of time required for it to mature and become harvestable, with expedited growth in suitable climates. Usually, once matured, these plants and animals can be maintained for sustained yields, or picked/slaughtered/chopped down to clear the space and gather base materials. Upkeep involves feeding and occasionally medicating animals, watering plant life and gathering from trees with failing to do so in a timely manner resulting in the withering and eventual death of any plant or animal life. Some animals are capable of mating, producing offspring that may be capable of being raised as a mount or battle pet, though the chances of this happening are extremely rare. Players may choose to uproot plants or needlessly slaughter animals before they are fully matured. Doing so will result in the removal of the plant or animal and has a chance to yield a small return, though typically will result in a loss of the initial item.

As with housing, farms require a tax to be paid in order to maintain ownership of the plots upon which they are placed. Taxes increase exponentially with each additional property owned. Failure to pay these taxes will result in the scarecrow being made vulnerable to attack, allowing players to destroy it and claim the plot for themselves.

=== Mounts and pets ===
ArcheAge has a pet system with pets being bought as babies and trained to grow into mounts or battle companions. Pets/mounts level up with distance traveled or experience gained during combat. They can be killed in battle, resurrected and suffer resurrection disease which can be healed at a stable. Pets/mounts have equipment slots like player characters.

=== Criminal justice ===
ArcheAge contains a judicial system with player run courts. Players can choose to answer jury summons and judge players who have committed crimes of theft or murder. There are minimum and maximum sentences that are determined by vote among the jurors. The system is a fundamental game mechanic, and not built to combat intentional "griefing" by players. Criminal players are imprisoned and can pay off their debt by working in the prison or trying to escape through digging their way out. Players are able to escape from the prison, however they are unable to use any abilities for the duration of their sentence. The development team has stated they may introduce a bribery system that would enable the accused player to bribe jurors.

=== Questing ===
The early-bird system lets players submit quests which are not yet completely finished, in exchange for reduced experience rewards. The opposite effect is overachieving, by gaining additional quest objectives, resulting in bonus experience. Hidden quests are available too, which can be unlocked by reaching special achievements.

=== Skills ===
The skill system of ArcheAge is very flexible as one chooses three basic skill types from a selection of eleven and can thus can create one's own "class" which is then leveled based in improvement. These classes can be changed at any time at a specific NPC however it does cost in-game currency to do so and can become expensive.

=== Trade Routes ===
Trading routes are a very effective way to make money or if one chooses "Gilda Stars" to unlock building or castle plans. A player gathers or farms specific materials in order to craft resources at a destination specific terminal and walks or rides them to a corresponding trading post merchant. Upon creating the resource (example: farm strawberries to create strawberry jam), this resource is then placed in a pack on a player and the player is unable to walk at full speed. This makes using the public transportation system (automated bus carts and airships) essential for the fast transportation of these goods. The further the trading post is from the crafting terminal, the higher the reward a player will receive. However, if the player is in neutral land, other players are free to kill them and take the player's pack. A player can place the pack on the ground whenever they wish to fight and pick it back up. Using a mount while carrying a pack will slow it down too (the fastest mount with a pack being a donkey), but packs can be stored in player-made vehicles (farm cart, ships).

=== Travel ===
There are many options for travel in ArcheAge, including walking, climbing (ladders, vines, trees), swimming, personal mounts and personal boats (from row boats to catamarans to galleons), as well as personal gliders or car-like machines such as tractors for transport of larger amounts of goods. There are predetermined travel routes by airships, taxi-like vehicles and portals too. Travel is fully 3-dimensional in ArcheAge; thus swimming and diving are possible. Diving can be improved with diving equipment. There is underwater planting, harvesting and gathering of resources along with underwater treasure hunting.

Some mounts allow players to backpack with another player upon invitation. Boats can be used in a similar fashion to transport other players with one player acting as driver.

==== Gliders ====
A unique mode of transportation is the glider, which can be equipped and upgraded. Gliders allow a limited form of flight, limited either by starting height or by a fixed time limit, depending on the specific glider in use. The Pegasus and Griffin are mounts that also functions as a glider.

== Game technology and special features ==
ArcheAge makes use of modern graphics effects like tessellation and ambient occlusion and contains a physics engine. ArcheAge uses player collision, unlike many other MMO's, thus player movement can be blocked by other players or NPC's.

=== ArcheAge: Unchained ===
ArcheAge: Unchained was announced in August 2019 and launched on Steam and Glyph on October 15, 2019. It has the same content and the same updates as ArcheAge but features a new monetization model that players buy one of three packs for one payment upfront, so there is no subscription and everyone is effectively a Patron in Unchained. This however changed recently and now Archeage Unchained has its own subscription model. The Marketplace does not offer gameplay advantages anymore but is purely cosmetic. Archepass was added, similar in style to a Battlepass offered for various games. Using a tier system, there are two paths just like other Battlepass systems. One is the basic free path where all items that may be considered pay-to-win previously is housed. The other is a premium path which houses cosmetic items. This is a separate game, so there are no carrying over characters and items from ArcheAge, it is a new beginning. ArcheAge Unchained got merged with the base game in November 2023 with all the characters and items transferred.

=== Security ===
The game client uses XIGNCODE3. Previously, Hackshield was used, followed by Easy Anti-Cheat, and there were plans to use GameGuard in the future.

== Lore ==
The story is based on The ArcheAge Chronicles, by the Korean author Jeon Min-hee. The plot outlines the struggle between the forces of good vs evil and heroes who set out to change the future in their favor.

== Reception ==
Reception

Aggregate score
Aggregator	Score
Metacritic	80/100

ArcheAge has received generally favorable reviews from critics, holding a score of 80 out of 100 on Metacritic based on 11 critic reviews.

== Sequel ==
A sequel titled ArcheAge S: Strait of Freedom was announced on 3 August 2026. It is developed by Studio Align, and co-produced by Kim Gyeongtae and Jeong Seogwon. ArcheAge S is planned for the Windows release only without any plans for mobile platforms. A behind-the-scenes developer documentary video was released in September 2026. It is set to be released in Q2 2027.
