= Tree of Savior =

2016 video game

- Developers: IMC Games Co., Ltd
- Publishers: KOR: NEXON Korea; EU/NA/SA/SEA: IMC Games Co., Ltd; JP: NEXON Japan; TH: NEXON Thailand
- Platform: Microsoft Windows
- Release: March 28, 2016
- Genre: Massively multiplayer online role-playing
- Mode: Online multiplayer

Tree of Savior (also known as TOS) is a free massively multiplayer online role playing game developed by IMC Games. The game was produced by Kim Hakkyu, developer of Ragnarok Online while the game's background music was done by various groups and artists like SoundTeMP, the same team known for their soundtracks in Ragnarok Online and Granado Espada. TOS is based on traditional Lithuanian culture and mythology.

The International version was released through Steam as a Founder's Early Access game on March 28, 2016, with the game releasing as a free-to-play title on April 28, 2016.

== World Setting ==
=== Cities ===
==== Klaipėda ====
Western part of the city of Klaipėda before the renovation.

Located in the South of the Kingdom within the Klaipėda region, the city of Klaipėda is one of the main cities in the world of Tree of Savior. The city is connected to West Siauliai Woods, the starting point for all the new Revelators. Klaipėda is considered the main administrative region of the kingdom with mining as the city's main industry. The prosperity of the city is mostly attributed to the crystal mined from the Siauliai's Crystal Mine in the past. In present days, the city is going through a difficult time; with the circulation of goods nearly extinguished and the city flooded with refugees from other regions because of Medzio Diena. The city is also home to several class masters such as Cleric Master Rozalija and Knight Commander Uska, the Templar Master and the city's ruling general.

The city's name was actually based on Klaipėda, the capital of Klaipėda County and the third largest city in Lithuania. Other maps that are connected to Klaipėda are the Gytis Settlement Area and the East Siauliai Woods that leads to the Crystal Mine and Miners' Village.

==== Orsha ====
Orsha is a city in the Southern Kingdom within the Royal Territory. As a city that precedes the kingdom, Orsha is one of the oldest cities in the world of Tree of Savior. The Orsha region was the last to be annexed by Zachariel the Great; leading to the founding of the Kingdom. During that period, there was a resistance among the Orsha locals that reject the demands of the King. However, before the final battle could even begin, the goddesses intervened and replaced the battle with safer competitions. This led to the defeat of Orsha's representatives against the King's warriors. Over the course of 1080 years, Orsha grew from a simple village to one of the two main cities in the Southern Kingdom. In respect of the city's tradition, Orsha is the only city to remain ruled by a local nobility appointed by the royal family. As of 2019, the city is being led by Inesa Hamondale, the Lord of Orsha.

The city's name was based on Orsha, a city in the Northeast of Belarus and southeast of Vitebsk. Other maps leading to Orsha are the Woods of the Linked Bridges and the Lemprasa Pond.

==== Fedimian ====
Located in the North of the Kingdom within the Fedimian Region, the city of Fedimian is one of the three currently accessible cities in the world of Tree of Savior. Within the city is the Divine District where many pilgrims from various towns gather to worship. A gigantic statue of the Goddess Zemyna can be seen at the Northern part of the Divine District; having its lower half buried due to the huge earthquake caused by Medzio Diena. The said statue is considered as the symbol of Fedimian. Aside from the Divine District, the city also had a Market District but was completely destroyed during Medzio Diena. Efforts are being made to revive the city after the events of Medzio Diena.

The Divine City is surrounded by numerous wonders and ruins. Some of the most noteworthy places surrounding Fedimian are the Mage Tower, the Great Cathedral, and the Cursed City. Also located within the city are various Class Masters such as Appraiser Master Sandra and Squire Master Justina Legwyn. Other areas connected to the city are the Fedimian Suburbs, Starving Demon's Way, and Seir Rainforest. The city is also a popular hangout place for Revelators where they can prepare themselves before embarking on a new journey.

== Features ==
=== PVP and Guild System ===
==== Team Battle League ====
The 'Team Battle League' or TBL is a PvP content of the game where players can compete with other players from the same regional servers. TBL have four separate sessions each day which each session lasting an hour. Anyone is free to spectate but only characters that are over Rank 5 will be able to participate in the TBL. Participating players are automatically moved to the 'Team Battle League' zone once all the combatants are ready; prompting them to compete on a best of three system. All participating players receive Battle Points after competing in TBL; a points they can use to purchase items in the Point Shop.

==== Gemstone Feud ====
The Gemstone Feud is another PvP game mode where two opposing camps battle each other for Gemstones. The entrance to the Feud is located at the Northern part of the Miner's Village. The Feud has no entry count limit. Saviors can participate every day at 10 AM, 2 PM, 6 PM and 10 PM in their corresponding server region’s time zone. The game mode is currently open to level 350 characters and above. After entering a session, saviors are automatically placed in one of the two opposing camps: the Pledge of the Blade or the Golden Note. Gemstones can be exchanged for valuable items. In 2022, this mode was removed.

==== Guild and Guild Territory Wars ====
Saviors preparing for a Guild Raid.

Previously limited to the Templar class, anyone can create a guild with additional features such Guild Hangout. Members of a guild can participate on different guild events such as boss hunting events and guild wars. Members can also do farming in their guild hangout and raise companion eggs obtained from guild events. Aside from these features, members of a guild can also participate in the Guild Territory Wars, a large-scale PvP challenge in which guilds can battle each other to seize areas of territory in a field. In the world of Tree of Savior, there are Spot Areas where players can fight in Territory Wars. Rewards for seizing a Spot depends on the grade of the Spot Area. Some of the existing Spots include Genar Field, Galeed Plateau, and Inner Wall District 8.

=== Dungeons and Modes ===
==== Uphill Defense Mission ====
Uphill Defense Mission is a party-focused mission where everyone must protect the Divine Torch from the waves of monsters. The mission is available to level 120 characters and above. While it doesn't give any EXP points, players can get valuable items for completing the mission. The mission can be accessed at the Saalus Convent area by talking to Sister Lhasa. Uphill Defense points earned can also be exchanged for various items. In 2022, this mode was removed.

==== Challenge Mode ====
Challenge Mode is a game mode that allows you to fight powerful monsters for equipment and reward items. Each character can only enter this mode once per day and can be accessed after defeating a certain number of monsters on a field of level 200 or above or by using a Challenge Mode Voucher. The challenge mode has a total of seven stages, with players requiring to finish the challenge in a limited amount of time.

== Classes ==
Tree of Savior utilizes a Class system which determines what abilities a character has access to. There are five base classes available at the start of the game. Players can advance to three more classes as they progress through the game, giving them a total of one base class and three advancement classes. Additionally, class skills can further be strengthened by improving its attributes. The following are the game's base classes and their available advanced classes:

| Swordsman | Wizard | Cleric | Archer | Scout |
|---|---|---|---|---|
| Doppelsoeldner | Necromancer | Druid | Hunter | Rogue |
| Dragoon | Taoist | Dievdirbys | Ranger | Linker |
| Lancer | Bokor | Monk | Musketeer | Bullet Marker |
| Retiarius | Psychokino | Sadhu | Mergen | Schwarzer Reiter |
| Rodelero | Shadowmancer | Exorcist | Wugushi | Squire |
| Matador | Sage | Oracle | Sapper | Thaumaturge |
| Murmillo | Sorcerer | Inquisitor | Falconer | Enchanter |
| Barbarian | Alchemist | Zealot | Cannoneer | Corsair |
| Cataphract | Elementalist | Chaplain | Quarrel Shooter | Assassin |
| Templar | Warlock | Kabbalist | Pied Piper | Outlaw |
| Fencer | Onmyoji | Krivis | Fletcher | Shinobi |
| Peltasta | Chronomancer | Pardoner | Appraiser | Ardito |
| Highlander | Cryomancer | Paladin | TigerHunter | Sheriff |
| Hackapell | Pyromancer | Priest | Matross | Rangda |
| Hoplite | Featherfoot | Plague Doctor | Arbalester | Clown |
| Nak Muay | Rune Caster | Miko | | |
| Blossom Blader | Terramancer | Crusader | | |

=== Hidden Classes ===
There are hidden classes in Tree of Savior with each one requiring certain requirements to unlock. As of November 2018, there are currently five hidden classes available in the game.

| Swordsman | Wizard | Cleric | Archer | Scout |
|---|---|---|---|---|
| Nak Muay | Rune Caster | Miko (Female) | Appraiser | Shinobi |
| | | Kannushi (Male Miko) | | |

=== Removed Classes ===
The Centurion Class is the only class to be temporarily removed from the game. The said class mainly specializes in battle formations; granting them the ability to control the movement of their allies and use different formations like the Phalanx and Tercio formation. As of June 2017, there are no official updates yet if the Centurion Class will come back as a higher rank class in the future.

== Companions ==
Companions are allies that follow your character and assists you in different ways. Some companions can be mounted on without the Companion Riding attribute, while companions like the Velheider and Hoglan requires a Companion Riding attribute to use it as a mount. There are also companions that are tied to a specific class like Hawk being the companion of the Falconer class.

Adopting a companion fills one of your available character slots and can be used by all of your characters. Depending on the companion, you can equip it with a weapon and armor to increase its attack and defense in battle. Players can also improve the attributes of its companion by visiting a companion trader or by bringing it with you in battles to increase its level.

| Companion | Cost | Information |
|---|---|---|
| Velheider | 110,000 silver | Can be used by any class. Needs a Companion Riding attribute to mount. |
| Hoglan | 453,600 silver | Can be used by any class. Needs a Companion Riding attribute to mount. |
| Hawk | 453,600 silver | Can only be used by Falconers. Can't be mounted. |

== Soundtrack ==
The backgrounds music of Tree of Savior currently consists of more than 160 individual tracks coming from various groups and artists. New tracks are added as with new maps and dungeons are introduced to the world of TOS. Below are some of the background music composers that were featured in the game:

- Symphonix
- ESTi
- S.F.A
- Kevin
- Cinenote
- Drogo
- 7Clouds
- Chronos
- Gaudium
- Questrosound
- SoundTeMP

== Development and release ==
Tree of Savior was developed by IMC Games, a company founded by Kim Hakgyu. Tree of Savior was first revealed at Hangame Ex in 2011 under the code name "Project R1"; leading to the attainment of the title "spiritual successor of Ragnarok Online". An official website was established on 22 December 2014. The game was posted to Steam Greenlight on May 12, 2015 and approved in less than 10 hours.

== Related games ==
A mobile game named Tree of Savior M was released on 2 November 2022.
