= Dungeon Fighter Online =

2005 video game

- Developer: Neople
- Publishers: Neople; Tencent (mobile)
- Series: Dungeon & Fighter
- Platform: Windows
- Release: KOR: August 2005; JP: November 2006; CHN: November 2007; TWN: July 16, 2009; NA: June 9, 2010; WW: May 15, 2015 (beta on March 24, 2015)
- Genre: Beat 'em up
- Mode: Multiplayer

Dungeon Fighter Online, known in South Korea as Dungeon & Fighter, (Note: Korean: 던전앤파이터.) is a multiplayer beat 'em up action role-playing game, developed and published for personal computers by Neople, a South Korean subsidiary of Nexon, and originally published by Hangame in 2005. The game was originally released in South Korea as Dungeon & Fighter, then in Japan as Arad Senki, (Note: Japanese: アラド戦記, Hepburn: Arado Senki; lit. War Records of Arad) and then published in China by Tencent. A global version of Dungeon Fighter Online was released in May 2015.

According to Nexon, Dungeon Fighter Online has over 850 million registered users worldwide and over $22 billion in lifetime revenue as of June 2023, which would make it one of the highest-grossing entertainment media products of all time.

== Gameplay ==
Dungeon Fighter Online is similar to 2D side-scrolling arcade hack and slash/beat 'em up games, such as Golden Axe or Double Dragon. Players traverse 2D screens while fighting hordes of monsters. There are a number of social aspects to Dungeon Fighter Online, including Guilds, PvP Arenas, and Party Play.

Skills can be designated upon an upper row of hotkeys, that can be further expanded by the decision of the player, who can choose to manually input the command to perform a certain skill; for example, a Blade Master can choose to press the assigned hotkey for the skill Draw Sword, but can also choose to perform its direct input. Directly inputting the skill (done by pressing the arrow keys in a certain sequence and then pressing the basic skill key) makes the skill cost less MP and lowers the cooldown of the skill (the time needed to wait to use the skill again) by a small amount. Skills are usually performed separately from normal combos, but some skills are "cancellable", meaning that those skills can be used in the middle of normal attacks.

== Development ==
Dungeon Fighter Online was developed by a South Korean company called Neople who previously only published a number of casual online games through their own game portal site. It was originally planned as a small game as the entire game was developed in five months based on the forecasted life expectancy, but the response was better than they expected so the budget was increased and the game was expanded. In terms of genre, Dungeon Fighter Online was initially planned as a fighting game similar to Tekken or The King of Fighters but this idea was scrapped as Neople felt that players wouldn't want to keep playing if there was a gap between them and their opponent's skill level. With this in mind, Neople looked for similar but different genres and ended up using belt-scrolling games such as Dynasty Wars and Cadillacs and Dinosaurs as an inspiration for making Dungeon Fighter Online an RPG.

Extensive testing took place before the premiere launch in Korea. Three closed beta periods were held between December 17–31, 2004, February 1–13, 2005, and June 28 – July 11, 2005. Neople accepted only 999 players per test and allowed only one hundred minutes of gameplay per day. Content was fine-tuned and updated daily throughout the test period based on testers feedback. After a short hiatus, open beta commenced on August 10, 2005, at 3 pm. By 11 pm, there were over 15,000 concurrent users.

Even though many games being released at the time were 3D, Neople decided to create Dungeon Fighter Online in 2D because they did not believe it affected gameplay, they did not feel a 3D game could capture the look and feel of the original illustrations of the characters, the ease of casual players getting into the game, and they had more experience with 2D games. Hi-res is not a likely path the game will take because director Yun Jong Kim's main focus is "efficiency".

=== North American release ===
Five years after the original release in Korea, Nexon America developed plans for an English version of Dungeon Fighter Online. The title was renamed from Dungeon & Fighter to Dungeon Fighter Online because of the awkwardness to say "Dungeon and Fighter".

Thousands of applicants were accepted into closed beta, which held for seven days between July 28 – August 3, 2009. Open beta started on September 22. Dungeon Fighter Online officially launched on June 9, 2010. The North American version of Dungeon Fighter Online was shut down on June 13, 2013.

Neople held an alpha test for a global version of the game in 2014. Beta testing was launched on March 24, 2015. Although a closed beta test for Dungeon Fighter Online was scheduled for release around March 2015, due to them moving their office to the island of Jeju, located off the south-west coast of South Korea, it became an open beta test because the Facebook page for the game had reached a specific number of "Likes", something that had been previously promised by Neople when it was still planned for a closed beta test.

Dungeon Fighter Online Season 2 was released in January 2016. The game was released on Steam as free-to-play on August 9, offering achievements and paid DLC. Dungeon Fighter Online Season 3 was released in January 2017, followed by Season 4 in February 2018, and Season 5 in the following year.

== Reception ==
Dungeon Fighter Online had a 300 million registered users celebration in May 2011. By August 2012, the game recorded a peak activity of 3 million concurrent users in China alone. Dungeon Fighter Online had 25 million monthly active users as of November 2012. It reached a total of 600 million users worldwide by 2018, and exceeded 700 million registered users worldwide by March 2020.

The game grossed over $2 billion in revenue as of March 2012. By 2015, it had an annual gross of $1.052 billion. Nexon revealed that Dungeon Fighter Online grossed a revenue of $8.7 billion in just over 10 years after its 2005 debut, more than the combined box office gross of Star Wars, the biggest film franchise at the time. In 2017, Dungeon Fighter Online grossed $1.6 billion, making it the year's second highest-grossing PC game (after League of Legends) and third highest-grossing video game (after League of Legends and Honor of Kings). By the end of 2017, the game had exceeded $10 billion in worldwide revenue, becoming one of the most-played and highest-grossing video games of all time.

By March 2018, Dungeon Fighter Online was the highest-grossing PC game of the month, above League of Legends. Dungeon Fighter's $223 million gross in that month was the third highest ever monthly revenue for a free-to-play game. Dungeon Fighter Online was the second highest-grossing digital game of 2018 with $1.5 billion, and again in 2019 with $1.6 billion, bringing its lifetime gross revenue to $13.4 billion as of 2019. As of May 2020, Dungeon Fighter Online has exceeded $15 billion in lifetime gross revenue, making it one of the highest-grossing entertainment media IPs, with its lifetime revenue larger than the box office gross of the Star Wars, Harry Potter and Avengers film series. As of December 2021, the original PC version of Dungeon Fighter Online has grossed over $18 billion in lifetime gross revenue and exceeded 850 million registered users worldwide.

== Sequels ==
A single-player game titled Dungeon Fighter Live: Fall of Hendon Myre was announced at E3 2012. It was released on 13 July 2012 for Xbox 360 via Xbox Live Arcade.

A mobile spin-off, Dungeon & Fighter Mobile, was released on 24 March 2022 for iOS and Android.
