= TalesWeaver =

2003 video game

- Logo
- Developer: Softmax
- Publisher: Nexon
- Platform: Microsoft Windows
- Release: June 2003
- Genre: MMORPG

TalesWeaver is a South Korean online game created by Softmax. The game plot is based on the Korean novel Children of the Rune. It is currently kept in Nexon. It is a game that has eight episodes and one character unique to TalesWeaver (compared to 4Leaf, where most of the playable characters came from). TalesWeaver currently has servers in Korea, Taiwan and Japan. A main Chinese server was created but taken down, and set up again in summer 2007 by TianCity. Around 2008, Hangame deployed their own TalesWeaver server under Nexon as a Japanese server.

The game is set in a fictional kingdom called Anomarad. There are four major cities that the player can travel to: Narvik, Laydia, Clad and Kaul. Other major cities have been added in Episode 2, such as Keltica, Eltivo and Cardiff.

== Gameplay ==
TalesWeaver is a 2-D MMORPG, with a viewing angle of about 60 degrees. Skills are "leveled up" by using experience points, rather than skill points. All skills use MP, and buff skills along with the more powerful skills use a number called Environmental Points. Environmental points are shared along every character nearby each other, and have a default of 999. Environmental points regenerate faster than MP, with almost a 10 to 1 ratio.

== Item Shop ==
The Japanese and Korean games both feature an item shop run by Nexon to bring in additional revenue.

The item shop like any other free to play MMORPG features special items and items that may not be available in-game to regular users and items of convenience.

== System ==
In Japan, it has been officially serviced since September 2004.

In China, it has been officially serviced since May 2004.
