= Mabinogi (video game) =

2004 video game

- Developer: devCAT
- Publisher: Nexon Korea
- Platform: Microsoft Windows
- Release: KOR: June 22, 2004; NA: March 27, 2008; OC: June 20, 2008; EU: May 26, 2010
- Genre: Massively multiplayer online role-playing game
- Mode: Multiplayer

Mabinogi (Korean: 마비노기) is a massively multiplayer online role-playing game released by Nexon, and developed by devCAT studio. The name of the game is taken from the Welsh word Mabinogi, a Welsh anthology of legend, and the settings for the game are loosely based on Irish mythology.

The game features hand-painted textures stylized with edge detection outlining. The game world is developed continuously, through the release of important updates (referred to as "Generations" and "Seasons") that introduce new areas, additional features such as pets and new skills, and advancement of the storyline. The user interface is simple and designed in the likeness of Microsoft Windows' task bar.

Mabinogi was built on a hybrid Value Added Services model (which varies slightly for each game localization) that allows free play and the subscription of paid packages, purchased through the game shop. In South Korea, beginning with the Chapter 3 patch, Mabinogi changed to micro-transactions. It allows 24-hour free play and the Item Shop only offers items and subscriptions for added options.

During the 2007 Gstar game show in Seoul, South Korea, Nexon announced an Xbox 360 version of Mabinogi, but the release of the console version has been indefinitely suspended after evaluations of the game through their business decisions. On June 17th, 2023 Nexon announced a large overhaul and planned modernization of Mabinogi that involves upgrading the game engine to Unreal Engine 5.

== Release ==
The game service is available in South Korea, Japan, Taiwan, Hong Kong, Mainland China, North America, Oceania, and Israel.

The North American closed beta test began on January 30, 2008. The pre-open beta only available to Fileplanet users was released on March 5. The full open beta was released on March 6 and the North American localization of Mabinogi was released on March 27.

An open beta of Mabinogi Europe with two game servers Morrighan and Macha was launched in January 2010. Along with the Open Beta release came the generation 2 expansion. It was expected that generation 3 would be released when the game enters the official phase, which was accompanied by the opening of the cash shop. Nexon Europe eventually launched Mabinogi on May 26. A few months later, Nexon Europe released Generation 12 at the same time as North America in October, a large update featuring new mainstream quests and skills. Shortly after this, Nexon Europe removed 2 of the 5 available game channels in Macha, due to a lack of players in that server.

Nexon Europe shut down European servers in April 2012 due to insufficient player-base growth and profit, and allowed its former users to play on North American servers with a new account and no character transfers if they wished to do so. Nexon America has since lifted the European IP blocks for Mabinogi. The game service and customer support of Mabinogi were later shut down in July.

== Reception ==
As of 2020, the game has over 20 million registered users worldwide. As of 2021, the game has grossed over $600 million in lifetime revenue.

== Other games ==
A prequel game for Mabinogi called Vindictus (also known as Mabinogi Heroes in Asia) was released on January 21, 2010, by devCAT, an internal studio of Korean free-to-play game publisher Nexon. It is a free-to-play action MMORPG that takes place in the same setting used in Mabinogi, but is placed chronologically several hundred years prior to the first game during a period of war and strife. Vindictus is currently released in Korea, North America, and Europe through Nexon.

Mabinogi II: Arena, the sequel to Mabinogi Heroes, was in development but subsequently cancelled. It was noted to feature more realistic 3D models, animation and settings, according to development diaries and press releases made by the game developer devCat. The game was previewed at G-Star 2012. The preview content depicted characters, enemies, and dungeon crawling that are similar to the original Mabinogi, but focused more on instant action-based combat similar to the style of Vindictus with an emphasis of the more down-to-earth skill animations similar to that of Mabinogi. By January 2014 the development of Mabinogi II: Arena was stopped.

A mobile installment named Mabinogi Mobile was released on 27 March 2025 for iOS and Android. The game's launch was a commercial success, grossing 300 billion won in revenue by October 2025.
