= List of South Korean inventions and discoveries =

This is a list of South Korean inventions and discoveries; Koreans have made contributions to science and technology from ancient to modern times. In the contemporary era, South Korea plays an active role in the ongoing Digital Revolution, with one of the largest electronics industries and most innovative economies in the world. The Koreans have made contributions across a number of scientific and technological domains. In particular, the country has played a role in the modern Digital Revolution through its large electronics industry with a number of modern revolutionary and widespread technologies in fields such as electronics and robotics introduced by Korean engineers, entrepreneurs, inventors, and scientists.

== Aquaculture ==
- Pollock farming

In 2016, the National Institute of Fisheries Science of South Korea succeeded in farming Alaska pollock for the first time in the world, allowing the fish to lay eggs a year and 8 months after birth, as opposed to 3 years in the wild. Alaska pollock is considered the "national fish" of Korea and is prepared in a number of dishes, including myeongnan-jeot, which was introduced and popularized in Japan as "mentaiko" in the 20th century.

== Mathematics ==
- Ree group

The Korean mathematician Rimhak Ree discovered and constructed the Ree group in the mathematical field of group theory.

== Technology ==
=== Electronics ===
- 3D hologram

The world's first 360-degree color hologram was developed by the Electronics and Telecommunications Research Institute in 2015.

- 3D nanoprinting pen

The first pen that performs 3D printing on the nanoscale was developed by Seongpil Hwang of Korea University in 2014.

- 5G smartphone

Samsung released the world's first 5G smartphone, the Galaxy S10 5G, in 2019.

- Curved display smartphone

The world's first curved display smartphone, the Samsung Galaxy Round, was released by Samsung on 10 October 2013.

- Double-data rate SDRAM (DDR SDRAM)

First demonstrated by Samsung in 1997. Samsung released the first commercial DDR SDRAM chip in June 1998.

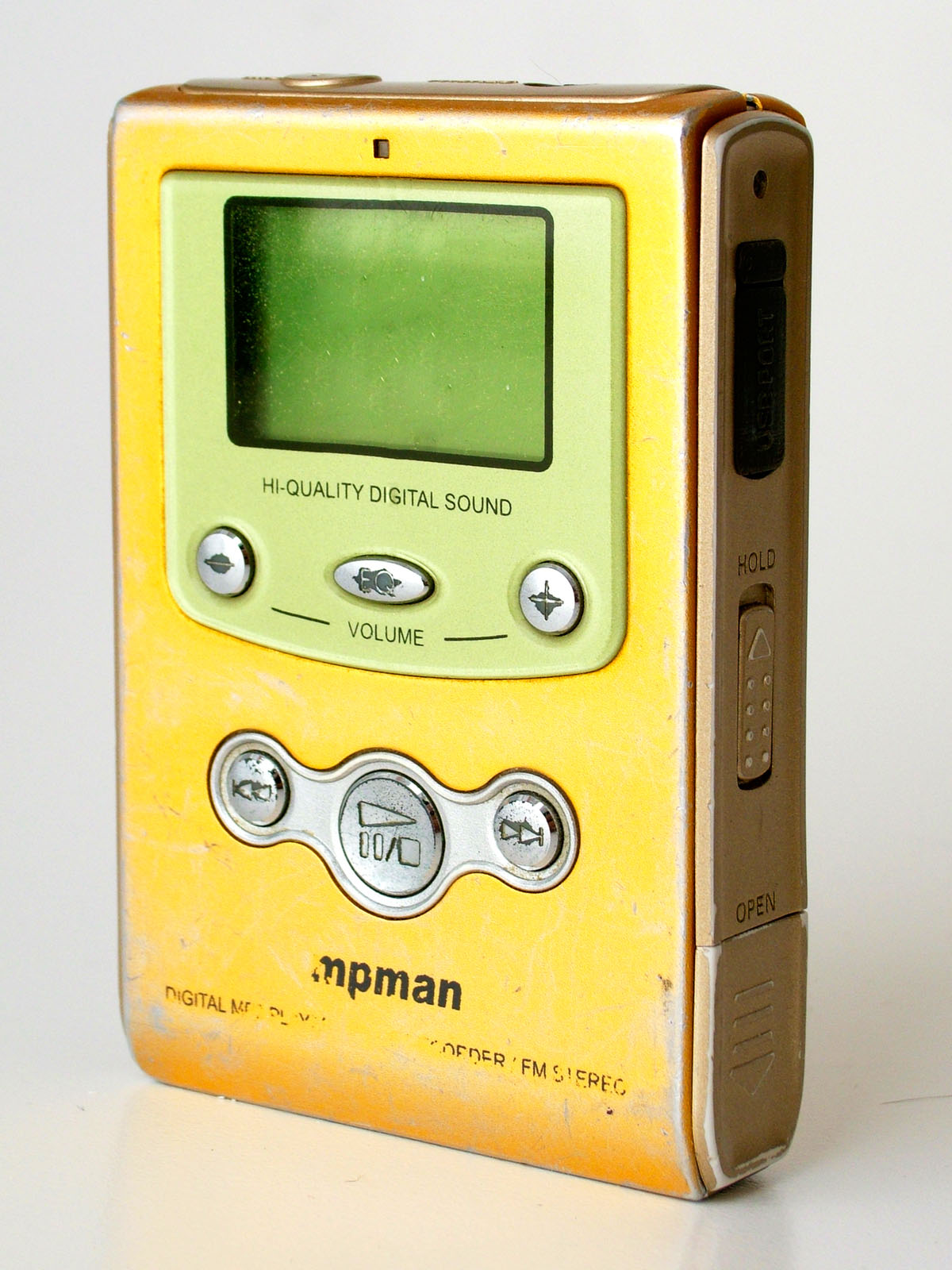
MPMan

- EyeCan

Samsung developed the first eye tracking mouse that doesn't require users to wear special equipment, called the EyeCan, in 2012.

- Flexible battery

In 2012, researchers at KAIST demonstrated the first fully functional all-flexible electronic battery system. In 2013, scientists led by Professor Lee Sang-young of Ulsan National Institute of Science and Technology developed the world's first bendable lithium ion batteries.

- Floating-gate MOSFET (FGMOS)

In 1967, Dawon Kahng and Simon Min Sze invented the floating-gate MOSFET, which provides the foundation for many forms of semiconductor memory devices.

- Graphics DDR SDRAM (GDDR SDRAM)

GDDR was initially known as DDR SGRAM (double data-rate synchronous graphics RAM). It was commercially introduced by Samsung Electronics in 1998.

- High Bandwidth Memory

High Bandwidth Memory is a high-performance RAM interface for 3D-stacked DRAM developed by SK Hynix and AMD to be used in conjunction with high-performance graphics accelerators and network devices.

- LTE mobile phone

Samsung released the world's first LTE mobile phone, the SCH-r900, in 2010, and the world's first LTE smartphone, the Samsung Galaxy Indulge, in 2011.

- Metal-oxide-semiconductor field-effect transistor (MOSFET)

In 1959, Dawon Kahng (a Korean American) and Mohamed Atalla at Bell Labs invented the metal–oxide–semiconductor field-effect transistor (MOSFET), a semiconductor that is the basic element in most of today's electronic equipment. It is the basic building block of the Digital Revolution, and the most widely manufactured device in history.

- MP3 phone

The first mobile phone to support MP3 playback, the SPH-M2100, was released by Samsung in 1999.

- MP3 player

The world's first commercially available MP3 player, the MPMan, was launched by SaeHan Information Systems in 1997.

- Online electric vehicle

Researchers at KAIST developed an electric transportation system in which online electric vehicles (OLEV) get power wirelessly through the application of shaped magnetic field in resonance, a new technology introduced by KAIST that enables electric vehicles to transfer electricity wirelessly from the road surface. The world's first OLEV buses began operation at the city of Gumi in March 2014.

- Retina display

Apple's "Retina" display was invented by LG and bought by Apple.

- Rollable keyboard

The world's first solid rollable keyboard was introduced by LG in 2015.

- Synchronous dynamic random-access memory (SDRAM)

The first commercial synchronous dynamic random-access memory (SDRAM) was the Samsung KM48SL2000 memory chip. It was introduced by Samsung Electronics in 1992, and mass-produced in 1993.

- Tablet computer

The first commercially available tablet computer, the GridPad, was manufactured by Samsung in 1989 after it absorbed Grid Systems Corporation in 1988. The GRiDPad was modified from the Samsung PenMaster, which was never commercially released.

- Touchscreen phone

The LG Prada is the world's first completely touchscreen mobile phone, and also the first mobile phone with a capacitive touchscreen.

- Transparent resistive random access memory

Transparent resistive random access memory (TRRAM) is the world's first transparent computer chip, invented by scientists at KAIST.

- TV phone

The world's first TV phone, the SCH-M220, was developed by Samsung in 1999.

- Universal Flash Storage

The world's first UFS memory cards were developed by Samsung.

- Watch phone

The world's first watch phone, the SPH-WP10, was released by Samsung in 1999.

- Wearable thermoelectric generator

Researchers led by Byung Jin Cho at KAIST developed a glass fabric-based thermoelectric (TE) generator that is extremely light and flexible and produces electricity from the heat of the human body.

=== Appliances ===
- Digital refrigerator

In 2000, LG Electronics introduced the world's first digital refrigerator called the Internet Digital DIOS.

- Dual washing machine

In 2015, LG Electronics unveiled the world's first washing machine that allows for two separate loads to be washed simultaneously using the "TWIN Wash System".

- Kimchi refrigerator

The kimchi refrigerator is designed to meet the storage requirements of kimchi. The first commercial kimchi refrigerator was created by Winia Mando in 1995.

- Steam closet

In 2011, LG introduced a closet, called the Styler, that steam cleans clothing that's hung inside without the use of water or detergents; it is used in hotels, airports, casinos, and homes in Korea.

- Steam mop

Invented by Romi Haan in 2001, the steam mop is a type of electric mop that uses hot steam to disinfect floors.

- Wall-mounted drum type washing machine

In 2012, Dongbu Daewoo Electronics introduced the world's first wall-mounted drum type washing machine called the "Mini".

=== Information technology ===
- 5G

In April 2019, Korea released the world's first 5G network, becoming the first country in the world to adopt 5G.

- Caller ringback tone

The caller ringback tone (CRBT) service, which allows subscribers to choose a piece of music or an audio clip that callers will hear in place of the standard 'ringing' tone when dialing the subscriber's number, was first offered in South Korea in 2002 by SK Telecom. It was developed in 2001 by the Korean firm Witcom.

- Contactless smart card

Beginning in 1995, Seoul was the first city in the world to use contactless smart cards, for electronic ticketing.

- Digital multimedia broadcasting

The digital multimedia broadcasting technology was developed in South Korea. It is a digital transmission system for sending multimedia to mobile devices.

- Electronic promissory note

In 2005, the Korean Ministry of Justice and a consortium of financial institutions announced the service of an electronic promissory note service, after years of development, allowing entities to make promissory notes (notes payable) in business transactions digitally instead of on paper, for the first time in the world.

- Mobile television service

By developing digital multimedia broadcasting (DMB), Korea became the first nation in the world to officially introduce mobile television service in May 2005.

- Virtual store

In 2011, Homeplus launched the world's first virtual store at Seolleung Station, enabling consumers to purchase items with their smartphones by scanning QR codes using the Homeplus app, then having the products delivered.

- WiBro

Developed in 2005 by Samsung Electronics, WiBro, an abbreviation of wireless broadband, is the first commercial mobile WiMax system in the world. In April 2007, KT began full commercial WiBro services in the Seoul metropolitan area and its vicinity for the first time in the world.

=== Robotics ===
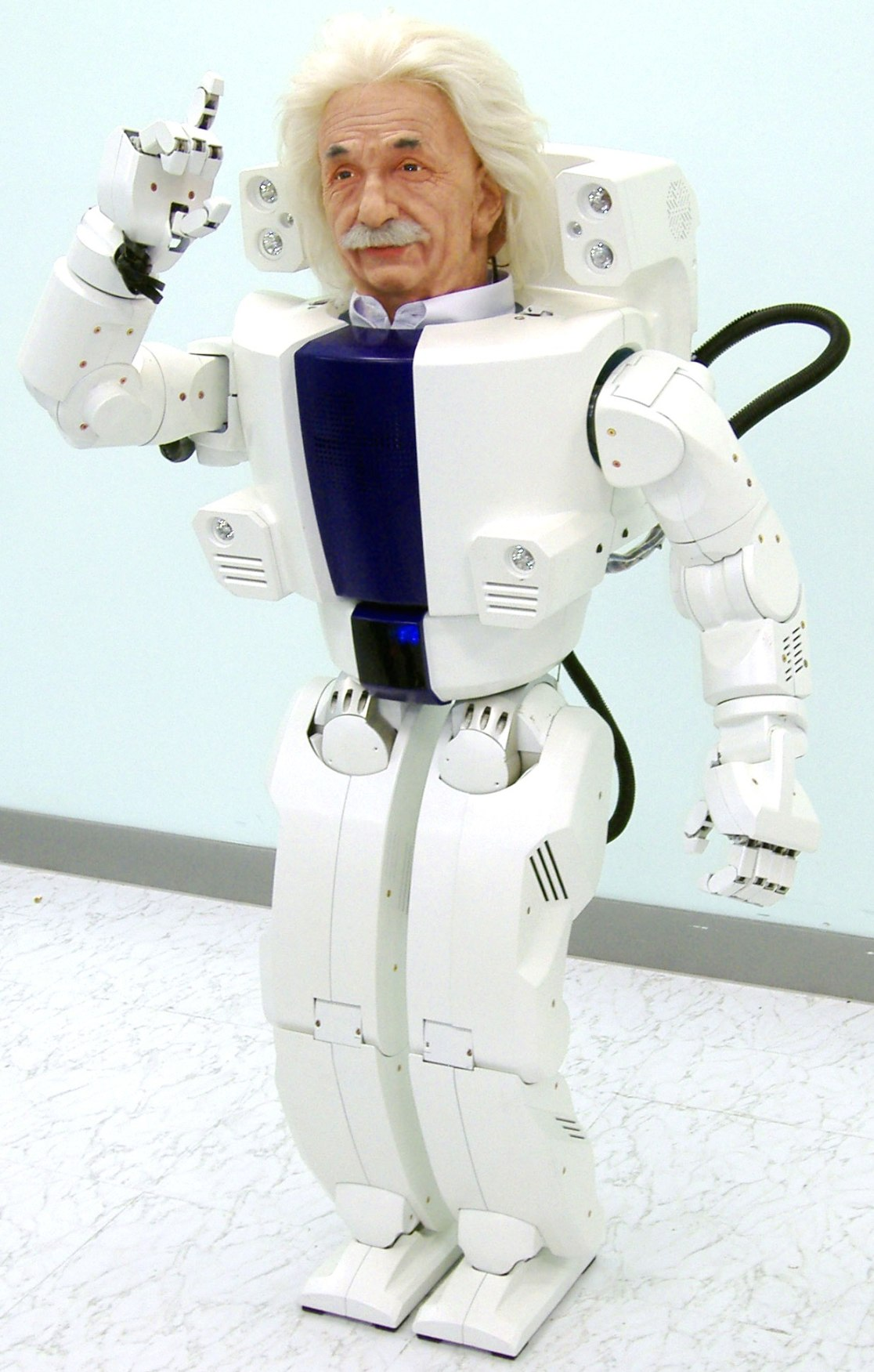
Albert HUBO

- Albert HUBO

Introduced in 2005, Albert HUBO is the world's first walking humanoid robot with an android head. It was a collaboration between Hanson Robotics and KAIST.

- Cancer-fighting nanobot

Scientists at the Chonnam National University in South Korea developed the world's first cancer-fighting nanobot, a microscopic robot called a "bacteriobot", that is injected into the bloodstream and seeks out and destroys cancer cells while leaving healthy cells alone.

- Ciliary microrobot

Hongsoo Choi's research team at the Daegu Gyeongbuk Institute of Science and Technology developed the world's first ciliary microrobots, that can move and function like single cells.

- Crabster CR200

CR200 Developed by the Korea Institute of Ocean Science and Technology, Crabster CR200 is the world's deepest and largest underwater walking robot. It can be used in scientific exploration projects and repairing structures such as pipes used to carry oil and gas.

- EveR-1

Developed by a team at the Korea Institute of Industrial Technology and introduced in May 2003, EveR-1 is the world's second android.

- HUBO

Introduced by KAIST in 2004, HUBO is the world's second walking humanoid robot, and the first to move with a natural gait.

- MAHRU

Developed by a team at Korea Institute of Science and Technology and introduced in March 2005, MAHRU (originally known as NBH-1) is the first network-based humanoid robot in the world.

- Manned bipedal robot

South Korea's Method-2 is the world's first manned bipedal robot.

- Robotic thyroidectomy

Robot-assisted transaxillary thyroid surgery (RATS), also called robotic thyroidectomy (RT), is a minimally invasive surgical technique developed in Korea that can remove all or part of the thyroid without scarring the neck.

- Robot prison guard

In 2011, the world's first robot prison guard was introduced. Developed by Lee Baik-chul, a professor at Kyonggi University, the robot prison guard uses 3D cameras to detect abnormal human behavior patterns.

=== Entertainment technology ===
- 4DX

Developed by South Korean conglomerate CJ Group in 2009, 4DX is the world's first 4D cinema technology, allowing a motion picture presentation to be augmented with environmental effects.

- Cinema LED screen

The world's first commercial cinema LED screen was developed by Samsung Electronics and installed in the Super S auditorium at the Lotte World Tower in Seoul. The screen is 10.3 meters wide and runs at 4K resolution, with brightness "ten times greater than that offered by standard projector technologies," according to Samsung. In 2018, Samsung debuted the world's first 3D cinema LED screen.

- ScreenX

Developed by South Korean conglomerate CJ Group in 2012, ScreenX is the world's first multi-projection system. It extends the images onto the theater walls to provide a 270-degree viewing environment.

=== Internet ===
- Ad supported Online video platform

Founded in October 2004, Pandora TV is the first video sharing website in the world to attach advertisement to user-submitted video clips and to provide unlimited storage space for users to upload.

- Internet café

In 1988, an archaic type of cybercafé called the "Electronic Café" was opened in front of Hongik University in Seoul, South Korea by Ahn Sangsu and Keum Nuri. It had two 16-bit computers connected to an online service provider through a telephone line. The first modern Internet café in Korea was opened in 1994. Korean Internet cafés, called PC bangs, are also LAN gaming centers, and boomed during the late 1990s thanks to the growth of the Internet and gaming cultures.

- MMORPG

Nexus: The Kingdom of the Winds was released by Nexon on 5 April 1996, making it one of the earliest graphical MMORPGs in the world.

- Question-and-answer platform

Naver, the leading search portal in South Korea, pioneered a real-time community-driven question-and-answer platform called Knowledge Search in 2002. In 2005, Yahoo! launched Yahoo! Answers, which was modeled, in part, on Naver's Knowledge Search.

- Loot box

The first known instance of a loot box system is believed to be an item called "Gachapon ticket" which was introduced in the Japanese version of MapleStory, a side-scrolling MMORPG, in June 2004. Such tickets were sold at the price of ¥100 per ticket. Like real-life gachapon machines, players attained randomly chosen game items when they used the ticket on "Gachapon", an in-game booth that was distributed across the game world.

- eSports

The first eSports league in the field of online gaming started in Korea in 1997. In December 1997, PC bang chains opened the first national online gaming league, known as the "Korea Pro Gamers League". The term "eSports" was coined by Park Ji-won of the Ministry of Culture, Sports and Tourism in February 2000 when he inaugurated the Korea e-Sports Association. OGN was the first online game specialty channel in the world, and opened the world's first eSports dedicated stadium.

- Social networking service

South Korea's Cyworld is the world's first mass social networking service. It was also the first in the world to have individual home pages and automated systems for contacting friends and relatives, leading to the creation of other popular sites such as Facebook and Myspace.

- Free-to-play

The free-to-play business model in online games was created by Nexon in Korea. The first game to use it was Nexon's QuizQuiz, released in October 1999, and made by Lee Seungchan, who would go on to create MapleStory.

- Webtoon

In 2003, Daum launched the "Webtoon" digital platform, creating a new form of manhwa (comics) that utilizes major characteristics of digital technologies. According to the Korea Creative Content Agency, "Webtoons are not simply scanned versions of print comics. It's a whole new, different genre tailored for the Internet age."

- Mukbang

Mukbang, also called "eating broadcast" or "social eating", is a type of online broadcast in which the host eats while interacting with online viewers. The mukbang Internet culture began on AfreecaTV in 2009.

- Citizen journalism

Launched in 2000, OhmyNews is the world's first online newspaper to publish reports by readers, or "citizen journalists", allowing civil participation in opposition of the conservative press. OhmyNews influenced the outcome of the 2002 South Korean presidential election, and is considered one of the country's most influential media outlets.

- Stickers

Developed by Naver for its LINE instant messaging app in Japan, stickers are large detailed emoticons featuring popular characters and themes. The original default characters and stickers, known as the LINE Friends, were created by Kang Byeongmok, also known as "Mogi", in 2011.

- Offline cryptocurrency exchange

Coinone, a Korean digital currency exchange company, opened a brick-and-mortar branch called Coinone Blocks that it claims is the world's first brick-and-mortar cryptocurrency trading floor.

- Live Streaming Platform

The earliest live streaming platform known outside of Korea was Livestream, launched in 2007. However, AfreecaTV was launched in 2005 making it the first live streaming platform in the world.

== Science ==
=== Social science ===
- Ilminism

Ilminism, translated as One-People Principle, is a political ideology in South Korea that is marked by its ultranationalism; it has been categorized by some scholars as a form of neo-fascism.

- Blue Ocean Strategy

The blue ocean strategy was developed by W. Chan Kim and Renée Mauborgne, who argue that companies can succeed not by battling competitors, but rather by creating ″blue oceans″ of uncontested market space.

- U-City

U-City (ubiquitous city) is defined as a "next generation urban space" that includes an integrated set of ubiquitous services: a convergent form of both physical and online spaces. Songdo in South Korea is the first U-City in the world.

=== Physical science ===
- Brown-Rho scaling

In 1991, Mannque Rho and Gerald E. Brown introduced Brown-Rho scaling, which predicts how hadronic masses scale in a dense medium.

- Color charge

In 1965, Moo-Young Han and Yoichiro Nambu first introduced a new hidden symmetry among quarks, which is the origin of what is now called the color SU(3) symmetry.

- Computational materials physics

In 1979, Jisoon Ihm first introduced a new field in condensed matter physics, called computational materials physics.

- Diversity oriented fluorescence library approach

Young-Tae Chang pioneered the diversity oriented fluorescence library approach (DOFLA) using a fluorescent library, allowing clear imaging of pancreatic cells.

- FINEX

POSCO and Siemens VAI developed a new iron-making technology called FINEX in which molten iron is produced directly using iron ore fines and non-coking coal rather than traditional blast furnace methods through sintering and reduction with coke.

- Giga steel

Giga steel is a type of steel developed by POSCO that can withstand over 100 kilograms per square millimeter, and is said to be "as light as aluminum but almost three times stronger," according to the company CEO.

- Graphene

In 2005, Philip Kim and Andre Geim's groups independently demonstrated peculiar and outstanding properties of graphene, leading to an explosion of interest in graphene. In his Nobel lecture in 2010, Andre Geim said, "I owe Philip a great deal for this, and many people heard me saying – before and after the Nobel Prize – that I would be honoured to share it with him." In 2009, Hong Byung-hee pioneered the synthesis of large-scale graphene by chemical vapor deposition, which triggered chemical researches toward the practical applications of graphene.

- Gravitational microlensing

In 1979, Kyongae Chang and Sjur Refsdal pointed out that a single star (a 'microlens') in a lens galaxy can cause flux variations on time scales of a year, leading to the Chang-Refsdal lens.

- Holotomography

Researchers at KAIST developed the HT-1, a next-generation holographic microscope for 3D live cell imaging without the need for staining or labeling. The HT-1 is the first system to achieve high-resolution tomographic microscopy with full optical/electronic control, and do so without having a mechanical rotation system.

- Positron emission tomography

Zang-Hee Cho and James Roberston were the first to propose a ring system that has become the prototype of the current shape of PET. Zang-Hee Cho also developed the first PET-MRI fusion molecular imaging device for neuro-molecular imaging.

- Invisible axion

The invisible axion was first originally proposed by the theoretical physicist Kim Jihn Eui.

- Lee-Weinberg bound

In 1977, Benjamin W. Lee and Steven Weinberg introduced the Lee-Weinberg bound, about the cosmological lower bound on heavy neutrino masses.

- Supersolid

In 2004, Eunseong Kim and Moses H. W. Chan discovered the first evidence of a superfluidlike state in solid helium.

- Nano 3D printing

Seung Kwon Seol's team at the Korea Electrotechnology Research Institute used a new 3D printing technique to demonstrate for the first time 3D printed nanostructures composed entirely of graphene.

- Smart prosthetic skin

Researchers at Seoul National University developed a "smart prosthetic skin" that can sense pressure, heat, and moisture.

- LK-99

=== Life science ===
- Hantavirus

Hantaan, the prototype hantavirus, was first isolated by Ho Wang Lee and Karl Johnson in 1978, and the first hantavirus vaccine to protect against hantavirus hemorrhagic fever with renal syndrome was developed in Korea in 1990.

- Cloned dog

The world's first cloned dog, Snuppy the Afghan Hound, was cloned at Seoul National University and born in 2005. Snuppy was also used in the first successful breeding between cloned canines.

- Preventive HIV vaccine

Chil-Yong Kang and his team at Western University developed the first genetically modified, whole-killed HIV vaccine to be approved for testing in humans, called the SAV001-H.

- Nanomedicine

Cheon Jinwoo of Yonsei University demonstrated, for the first time, the nanoscale size-dependent MRI contrast effect, opening a new gateway to "nanomedicine", and also introduced the world's most advanced nano-MRI technology, MEIO (magnetism-engineered iron oxide).

- Stent implantation of left main coronary artery stenosis

Park Seung-jung pioneered a new method using a stent as an alternative treatment for left main coronary artery stenosis, an abnormal narrowing of the aortic valve in the heart.

- Video-assisted minilaparotomy surgery

Koon Ho Rha and Seung Choul Yang at Yonsei University invented video-assisted minilaparotomy surgery (VAMS), a hybridized form of laparoscopic and open surgeries.

- Percutaneous endoscopic cervical discectomy

Sang-Ho Lee of Wooridul Spine Hospital pioneered percutaneous endoscopic cervical discectomy, which is the first laser-assisted endoscopic technique for herniated disc surgery.

- Pharmaceutical drugs
  - Gemifloxacin is a fluoroquinolone antibiotic developed by LG Life Sciences that is used in the treatment of acute bacterial exacerbation of chronic bronchitis and mild-to-moderate pneumonia.
  - Balofloxacin is an orally active fluoroquinolone antibiotic developed by Choongwae Pharma for the treatment of urinary tract infections.
  - Tedizolid is an oxazolidinone antibiotic developed by Dong-A ST, the specialty pharmaceuticals arm of Dong-A Socio Holdings, to treat patients with acute bacterial skin and skin structure infections.
  - Gemigliptin is a dipeptidyl peptidase-4 inhibitor developed by LG Life Sciences to treat hyperglycemia in patients with type 2 diabetes mellitus.
  - Evogliptin is a dipeptidyl peptidase-4 inhibitor developed by Dong-A ST.
  - Fimasartan is a non-peptide angiotensin II receptor antagonist developed by Boryung Pharmaceutical to treat hypertension and heart failure.
  - Radotinib is a drug for the treatment of chronic myeloid leukemia, developed by Ilyang Pharmaceutical.
  - Zabofloxacin is an investigational fluoroquinolone antibiotic to treat multidrug-resistant infections due to gram-positive bacteria. It was discovered by Dong Wha Pharmaceuticals and licensed to Pacific Beach BioSciences for development.
  - Udenafil is a PDE5 inhibitor developed by Dong-A Pharmaceutical to treat erectile dysfunction.
  - Polmacoxib is a nonsteroidal anti-inflammatory drug developed by CrystalGenomics to treat osteoarthritis.
  - Ilaprazole is a proton pump inhibitor developed by Ilyang Pharmaceutical to treat dyspepsia, peptic ulcer disease, gastroesophageal reflux disease, and duodenal ulcer.

== Horology ==
- Braille smartwatch

The world's first Braille smartwatch, called the Dot, was developed by a Korean startup company. The Dot features a tactile button display and uses Bluetooth to connect to electronic devices.

== Military ==
- Sentry guard robot

In 2006, Samsung Techwin released the Samsung SGR-A1, a sentry guard robot designed to replace human counterparts at the Korean Demilitarized Zone. It is the first of its kind to have surveillance, tracking, firing, and voice-recognition systems built into a single unit.

- Super aEgis II

In 2010, DoDaam Systems introduced the Super aEgis II, one of a new breed of automated weapon that can identify, track, and destroy a moving target at a distance of 4 km.

- Airburst assault rifle

Daewoo's K11 is the first gun of its kind to be operational in the field, making the Republic of Korea Army the first in the world to use an airburst assault rifle as standard issue.

== Alternative medicine ==
- Hand acupuncture

Koryo hand acupuncture is a newer system of acupuncture, created by Yu Tae-u in the 1970s, in which the hand represents the entire body and is needled or stimulated during treatment. Hand acupuncture is popular among the general population as a form of self-medication in Korea, and has adherents in Japan and North America; it is also popular among overseas Koreans. Korean hand acupuncture is different from American hand reflexology, another form of alternative medicine.

== Music ==
- K-pop

K-pop, or South Korean popular music, began in 1992 with the debut of Seo Taiji and Boys, a band that challenged musical and societal norms in South Korea with music influenced by American genres. Today, K-pop leads the Korean Wave with idol groups such as BTS.

== Sports ==
- Jokgu

Inspired by the Southeast Asian sport sepak takraw, jokgu is a modern sport invented in 1960 by members of the Republic of Korea Air Force's 11th Fighter Wing that combines aspects of football and volleyball.

- Taekwondo

Created in 1955, taekwondo has become the national sport of South Korea and an official Olympic sport since the 2000 Summer Olympics. Taekwondo is based on taekkyeon and Shotokan karate.

== Products ==
- Italy towel

The Korean exfoliating mitt is a mass-produced bath product used to scrub and peel the outermost layer of skin; it was invented in Busan by Kim Won-jo(CEO of Hanil Textile) in 1967. Since then, the Italy towel has become a household item in Korean homes and a staple item in Korean saunas. The Korean exfoliating mitt was named the Italy towel because the viscose fabric used to make it was imported from Italy at the time.

- Gable top

Gable tops were invented by Dr. Shin Seok-kyun in 1953 allowing for milk cartons to be sealed tight after opening for later use. Dr. Shin Seok-kyun, so-called Edison of Korea, unfortunately he couldn't file his patent given the turbulent context in the middle of Korean War. Eventually, this gable top carton made its way into the U.S. by U.S. army and was set as the international standard.These days, gable top cartons are used all around the world.

- Electrically heated stone bed

The dol bed, or stone bed, is a manufactured bed that has the same heating effect as ondol and is purported to have health benefits. The dol bed industry is estimated to be worth 100 billion South Korean won, comprising 30 to 40 percent of the entire bed industry in South Korea; dol beds are most popular with middle-aged people in their 40s and 50s.

- Circle contact lens

Special cosmetic contact lenses popular in Asia that make the eye's iris appear larger in different shades. This product was invented in South Korea.

- Sheet Mask

Sheet masks are face-shaped sheet fabrics soaked in nutrition-packed solution called serum, used as skincare and beauty product originated in Korea.

- Lock & Lock

== Miscellaneous ==
- Thundersticks

Thundersticks, known as makdae pungseon in Korea, are inflatable plastic promotional noisemakers that are most often used at sporting events, political rallies, and concerts. Makdae pungseon were created by BalloonStix Korea and first used in 1994 at an LG Twins baseball game.

- Knowledge Industrial Center (Apartment-Type Factory)

The apartment-type factory (아파트형 공장) is legally defined as having 3 or more floors and accommodating 6 or more factories in the same building. The apartment-type factory was formed in order to solve industrial structure changes and offshoring of plants due to the rise of land value. The first apartment type-factory, Incheon Juan Apartment type factory were generated in 1989. In 2010, the term "apartment-style factory" was changed to "knowledge industrial center"(지식산업센터). Unlike traditional smokestack factories, the semi-industrial district knowledge industrial center makes efficient use of land and blends ICT, knowledge, and manufacturing industries into one building, creating a co-support system for medium sized businesses. Modern knowledge industrial centers have door-to-door interior hallways for vehicles and drive-in systems in multiple floors for truck loading, as well as special attention to quality employee experience through beautification and communal recreation. This type of factory has also been spread outside of Korea, such as Vietnam.

- Ice-breaking LNG carrier

The world's first ice-breaking LNG tanker was developed by DSME in 2016, and such ships have been instrumental to transporting natural gas from the arctic regions, where the environment made it very difficult in the past.

- Drive-through COVID-19 testing

South Korea pioneered the coronavirus drive-through testing system in the city of Goyang in 2020, during the middle of the COVID-19 pandemic.

- Tornado potato

== See also ==
- International rankings of South Korea#Innovation
- Science and technology in South Korea
- History of science and technology in Korea
- History of typography in East Asia
- List of Chinese inventions
- List of Chinese discoveries
- List of Japanese inventions and discoveries
- List of Taiwanese inventions and discoveries
