= Seo Eunsuk =

South Korean politician (born 1967)

- 서은숙
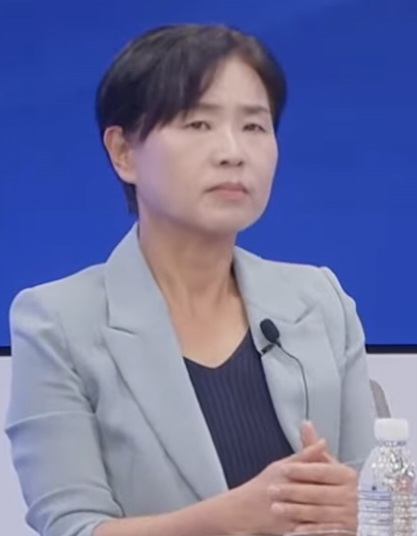

Mayor of Busanjin District
- In office 1 July 2018 – 1 June 2022
- Preceded by: Ha Gye-yeol
- Succeeded by: Kim Young-wook

Member of Busanjin District Council
- In office 1 July 2006 – 30 June 2014

Personal details
- Born: 25 September 1967 (age 59)
- Party: Democratic
- Education: Busan Women's College; Pusan National University

Korean name
- Hangul: 서은숙
- Hanja: 徐銀淑
- RR: Seo Eunsuk
- MR: Sŏ Ŭnsuk

Seo Eunsuk (Korean: 서은숙; born 25 September 1967) is a South Korean politician who served as the mayor of Busanjin District of Busan from July 2018 to June 2022. She was the first woman to hold this position.

Seo, along with Buk District Mayor Jeong Myeong-hui and Geumjeong District Mayor Jeong Mi-yeong, was elected as the first woman mayor of their respective district in Busan in the 2018 election where 13 out of 16 autonomous districts/counties of Busan, including Busanjin District, have their first mayors not from People Power Party or its preceding parties.

Seo previously served as a member of the district legislature from 2006 to 2014. During her first term from 2006 to 2010, she served as the only democratic member of the Busanjin District Council

In the 2018 election, Seo defeated Kim Yeong-wook (Korean: 김영욱) from the main opposition party who served as a three-term member of Busan Metropolitan Council.

In 1989 Seo was the president of the student union of her college, Busan Women's College, the only women's university outside of Seoul Capital Area. In 2002 she was the secretary-general of an organisation consisted of members from civil societies supporting Roh Moo-hyun's presidential campaign and led by then-lawyer Moon Jae-in. After losing her election in 2014, she worked for then-Mayor of Seoul Park Won-soon as one of his special advisors on policy.

Seo holds two degrees - a bachelor in English language and literature from Busan Women's College and a master's in ethics from Pusan National University where she also completed a doctorate programme on ethics.

== Electoral history ==
Election	Year	Post	Party affiliation	Votes	Percentage of votes	Results
4th Local Election	2006	Member of Busanjin District Council (proportional representation)	Uri Party	29,078	18.74%	Won
5th Local Election	2010	Member of Busanjin District Council	Democratic Party (2008)	7,228	35.83%	Won
6th Local Election	2014	Member of Busan Metropolitan Council from Busanjin District 2nd district	New Politics Alliance for Democracy (NPAD)	18,427	41.74%	Lost
7th Local Election	2018	Mayor of Busanjin District	Democratic Party	89,399	50.1%	Won
