= PMO =

PMO may refer to:

== Government and military ==
- Polish Military Organisation, an intelligence and sabotage group during World War I
- Prime Minister's Office (disambiguation), government departments in several countries
- Principal Medical Officer, a senior position
- Priority Material Office, a logistics support command of the United States Navy
- Privatization and Management Office, a Philippine government agency

== Science ==
- Periodic mesoporous organosilica, a form of silica
- Phosphorodiamidate morpholino oligo, a biochemical
- Planetary-mass object, in astronomy
- Prosopometamorphopsia, a visual disorder

== Other uses ==
- Falcone Borsellino Airport, Italy (IATA code: PMO)
- Pine Mountain Observatory, an astronomical telescope in Oregon, US
- Project management office, a internal standards group
- pmo, 2020s slang for 'piss me off'
