= Chang-Sik Ha =

South Korean materials scientist

- Occupations: Polymer and materials scientist, author, and academic

Academic background
- Education: B.Sc., Chemical Engineering; M.Sc., Chemical Engineering; Ph.D., Polymer Science and Engineering
- Alma mater: Pusan National University; Korea Advanced Institute of Science and Technology

Chang-Sik Ha (Korean: 하창식) is a polymer and materials scientist, author, and academic. He is an emeritus professor of Chemical Engineering at Pusan National University.

Ha's research focuses on periodic mesoporous organosilicas, organic–inorganic nanohybrids, and functional polymers such as polyimides and silsesquioxanes. He is a member of the Korean Academy of Science and Technology.

== Education ==
Ha received his B.Sc. in Chemical Engineering from Pusan National University in 1978. In 1980, he received an M.Sc. in Chemical Engineering from the Korea Advanced Institute of Science and Technology (KAIST) and earned a Ph.D. in Polymer Science and Engineering in 1987 from the same university.

== Career ==
Ha began working as a full-time lecturer in Pusan National University's Department of Polymer Science and Engineering in 1982. He was subsequently appointed as an assistant professor in 1985, an associate professor in 1989, and then as a professor in 1994 at Pusan National University, a position he held until his retirement in 2021. Since then, he has been a distinguished professor and has held the title of emeritus professor.

Ha was vice president of Pusan National University from 2012 to 2013 and also directed research initiatives at the National Research Laboratory of Nano-Information Materials between 2003 and 2008, as well as at the Pioneer Research Center for Nanogrid Materials from 2010 to 2016. Later, he assumed the role of editor-in-chief of Macromolecular Research between 2008 and 2011. He is also the Asia editor for Composite Interfaces.

== Research ==
Ha's research has explored periodic mesoporous organosilicas (PMOs) and advanced hybrid polymers. He identified PMOs as promising sensor materials due to their stable physicochemical properties, biocompatibility, and scalability. He also showed that the incorporation of hetero-aromatic components into PMOs can enable selective molecular recognition and stimuli-responsive drug delivery. In his book Periodic Mesoporous Organosilica, co-authored with Sung Soo Park, he provided an overview of PMO synthesis, properties, and applications in catalysis, sensing, biomedicine, and materials engineering.

Ha published Hydrophobic and Superhydrophobic Organic–Inorganic Nanohybrids with Saravanan Nagappan, which highlighted the development, enhanced properties, and potential applications of these materials across environmental and energy technologies. He further underscored the importance of organic–inorganic hybrid nanomaterials as functional components for applications in nanomedicine, food packaging, and catalysis, noting that the development of semiconducting polymer–inorganic hybrid nanocomposites has further expanded their significance. In parallel, his studies on polyimides (PIs) highlighted their structural and functional characteristics such as thermal stability, mechanical strength, and dielectric properties, which make them suitable for advanced material systems. Moreover, he published Advances in Organic Light-Emitting Devices with Youngkyoo Kim, in which they discussed the principles of organic electroluminescence and the progress in the design and optimization of light-emitting devices.

Ha explored colorless polyimides (CPIs) as durable, high-performance materials for advanced technological applications. He also highlighted that the enhanced stability of polyimide-based hybrids arises from strong interfacial bonding with inorganic components such as iron or silica. Additionally, he studied PHA polymers with diverse compositions, as well as superhydrophobic fiber-based surfaces for applications such as self-cleaning textiles.

== Awards and honors ==
- 2003 – Member, Korean Academy of Science and Technology
- 2004 – Member, National Academy of Engineering of Korea
- 2016 – SPSJ International Award, Society of Polymer Science, Japan
- 2018 – Meritorious Service Medal, Vietnam Academy of Science and Technology
- 2021 – Order of Service Merit, President of the Republic of Korea

== Bibliography ==
=== Selected scientific books ===
- Ha, Chang-Sik; Rhee, Hee-Woo (2001). Nanoporous Polymers. Polymer Series 3. Seoul, South Korea: Munundang Publishing Co. Ltd. ISBN 978-89-7393-214-6.
- Kim, Youngkyoo; Ha, Chang-Sik (2008). Advances in Organic Light-Emitting Devices. Trans Tech Publications. ISBN 978-0-87849-483-5.
- Cho, Won-Jei; Ha, Chang-Sik; Chung, Ildoo (2013). Polymer Chemistry. Munundang Publishing Co. ISBN 978-89-7393-957-2.
- Ha, Chang-Sik; Nagappan, Saravanan (2018). Hydrophobic and Superhydrophobic Organic–Inorganic Nanohybrids. Pan Stanford Publishing. ISBN 978-981-4774-68-0.
- Ha, Chang-Sik; Park, Sung Soo (2018). Periodic Mesoporous Organosilicas: Preparation, Properties, and Applications. Springer Singapore. ISBN 978-981-13-2958-6.

=== Selected essay books ===
- Ha, Chang-Sik (2003). Apple and Yogurt. Brain Korea. ISBN 978-89-953112-8-8.
- Ha, Chang-Sik (2018). Wild Card. Sejong Publisher. ISBN 979-11-5979-247-2.
- Ha, Chang-Sik (2021). The Meaning of Transfer. Yukil Cultural Publishing. ISBN 979-11-91268-12-6.
- Ha, Chang-Sik (2024). Stories of Rainbow-like Bildungsroman. Pusan National University Press. ISBN 978-89-7316-797-5.
- Ha, Chang-Sik (2025). One Fine Morning: The Seventh Story of Remembering, Feeling, and Living. Yukil Cultural Publishing. ISBN 979-11-91268-73-7.

=== Selected articles ===
- Lim, H.; Cho, W.-J.; Ha, C.-S.; Ando, S.; Kim, Y.-K.; Park, C.-H.; Lee, K. (2002). "Flexible Organic Electroluminescent Devices Based on Fluorine-Containing Colorless Polyimide Substrates". Advanced Materials. 14 (18): 1275–1279. Bibcode:2002AdM....14.1275L. doi:10.1002/1521-4095(20020916)14:18<1275::AID-ADMA1275>3.0.CO;2-Y.
- Guo, Wanping; Park, Ji-Yong; Oh, Mi-Ok; Jeong, Hye-Won; Cho, Woo-Jin; Kim, Il; Ha, Chang-Sik (2003). "Triblock Copolymer Synthesis of Highly Ordered Large-Pore Periodic Mesoporous Organosilicas with the Aid of Inorganic Salts". Chemistry of Materials. 15 (12): 2295–2298. doi:10.1021/cm0258023.
- Choi, Myeon-Cheon; Kim, Youngkyoo; Ha, Chang-Sik (2008). "Polymers for flexible displays: From material selection to device applications". Progress in Polymer Science. 33 (6): 581–630. doi:10.1016/j.progpolymsci.2007.11.004.
- Dong, Fuping; Guo, Wanping; Park, Sung-Soo; Ha, Chang-Sik (2011). "Uniform and monodisperse polysilsesquioxane hollow spheres: synthesis from aqueous solution and use in pollutant removal". Journal of Materials Chemistry. 21 (29): 11244–11252. doi:10.1039/C1JM11337B.
- Park, Sung Soo; Ha, Chang-Sik (2018). "Hollow Mesoporous Functional Hybrid Materials: Fascinating Platforms for Advanced Applications". Advanced Functional Materials. 28 (27) 1703814. Bibcode:2018AdvFM..2803814P. doi:10.1002/adfm.201703814.
