= Jeong Myeong-hui (disambiguation) =

Jeong Myeong-hui (Korean: 정명희) is a Korean name. Relevant people of this name are:

- Chung Myung-hee (born January 1964), South Korean badminton player
- Jeong Myung-hee (born May 1964), South Korean basketball player
- Jeong Myeong-hui (born 1966), South Korean politician
