= Jeong Mi-yeong =

South Korean politician

- 정미영

Mayor of Geumjeong District
- Incumbent
- Assumed office 1 July 2018
- Preceded by: Won Jeong-hee

Member of Geumjeong District Council
- In office 1 July 2006 – 30 June 2018

Personal details
- Born: 1 March 1967 (age 59)
- Party: Democratic
- Education: Pusan National University

Jeong Mi-yeong (Korean: 정미영; Hanja: 鄭美英; born 1 March 1967) is a South Korean politician serving as the mayor of Geumjeong District of Busan and its first woman mayor from July 2018.

Jeong, along with Busanjin District Mayor Seo Eunsuk and Buk District Mayor Jeong Myeong-hui, was elected as the first woman mayor of their respective district in Busan in the 2018 election where 13 out of 16 autonomous districts/counties of Busan, including Geumjeong District, have their first mayors not from People Power Party or its preceding parties.

In the 2018 election, Jeong defeated two-term mayor of the district, Won Jeong-hee (Korean: 원정희) from the main opposition party. She previously served as the member of Geumjeong District Council for three terms, the maximum limit, from 2006 to 2018. From 2008 to 2010 she was elected-vice chair of the council. She is the only democratic politician in Busan who has been elected for the same post for three times and was the only democratic politician elected in the 2006 election in greater Yeongnam region.

She taught Japanese at community centers in Geumjeong district for over 19 years and ran "small-library" for 15 years.

Jeong holds a bachelor's degree in library studies from Pusan National University.

== Electoral history ==
Election	Year	Post	Party affiliation	Votes	Percentage of votes	Results
4th Local Election	2006	Member of Geumjeong District Council	Uri Party	4,503	21.87%	Won
5th Local Election	2010	Member of Geumjeong District Council	Democratic Party (2008)	7,432	34.93%	Won
6th Local Election	2014	Member of Geumjeong District Council	New Politics Alliance for Democracy (NPAD)	10,294	43.07%	Won
7th Local Election	2018	Mayor of Geumjeong District	Democratic Party	67,679	54.50%	Won
