= Hur Aram =

South Korean writer

Aram Hur
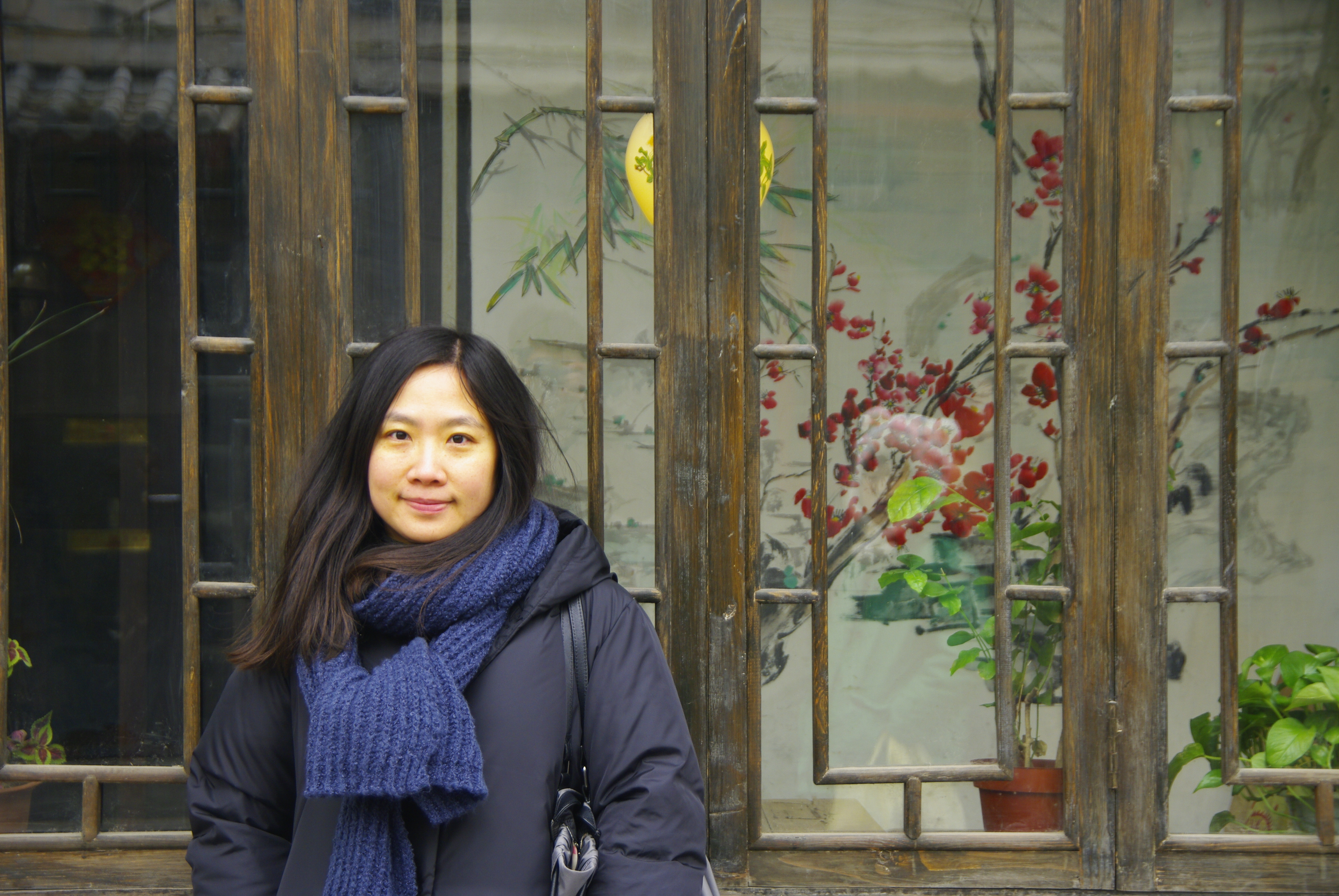
- Aram Hur
- Born: March 4, 1971 (age 55); Miryang, Gyeongsangnam-do
- Scientific career
- Fields: Literature; Education; Humanities; Global justice
- Workplaces: Indigo Book Company

Korean name
- Hangul: 허아람
- RR: Heo Aram
- MR: Hŏ Aram

Aram Hur is a South Korean teacher, practicing humanist, educator, publisher, lecturer, and social entrepreneur.

== Biography ==
Aram Hur was born in Miryang, South Korea on March 4, 1971, and grew up in Busan. She received her BA and MA from Pusan National University and has lectured on literature, philosophy, art, linguistics and educational studies.

== Career ==
Hur is the founder and chairperson of Indigo Book Company (인디고 서원) which is located in Busan, South Korea. Opened on 28 August 2004, it is a humanities bookstore for young people which also hosts public events, educational movements, and social activities; it is a combination of nonprofit book publisher, magazine (Humanities Magazine for Youths "INDIGO+ing"), bookstore, after-school course program, and community center. She is a founding member and chief director of Indigo Youth Book Fair. She opened a vegetarian restaurant, Ecotopia- the combination of the words: ‘ecology’ and ‘utopia’. All proceeds from Ecotopia are donated to Indigo's Library Projects in the remote villages of Nepal.

== Publications ==
- My Beautiful Girl, Indigo (2005)
- Theme and Variations Vol. I/II (2006)
- Happy Readings in Indigo Seowon (2007)
- Toto meets Morrie-Humanities Class with Teacher Aram (2007)
- Youths with Creative Passion, Dreaming a Better World (2007)
- Living a Dream: A journey of Young Creative Idealists (2008)
- Youths dream of Righteous World, Communicating with the World (2009)
- This I Believe (2009)
- INDIGO+ing Bi-monthly Humanities Magazine for Youth (Korean/English), started 2006
- INDIGO Quarterly Humanities Magazine for Young People (English), started 2010
- Re-evaluation of Values: A Journey in Search of Core Values (2010)
- To Love Is To Read (2011)
- Demanding the Impossible: An Interview with Slavoj Žižek (Polity Press, 2013)
- The Task of Living: An Interview with Zygmunt Bauman (2014)
- The Center of Possibilities: An Interview with Kojin Karatani (2015)
- Doing Democracy-Democracy for a New Generation 1 (2017)
- Poor Society, Noble Life-Democracy for a New Generation 2 (2017)
- The Eternal Boy-Democracy for a New Generation 3 (2017)

== Awards ==
- The Korea Publication Ethics Commission (2007) - Grand Prize
- The People Who Make Our World Brighter (2007) - Korea Green Foundation
- Everest Summit Award (2008) - Nepal Government & Today's Youth Asia
- Young Achievers Award (2008) - TYA
- Young Korean Award (2009) - Grand Prize (First Winner)
