= Ionosilica =

Ionosilicas are defined as organosilicas containing chemically bound ionic groups. They represent a class of mesoporous organosilicas.

Mesoporous materials have been defined as porous materials with pore size ranging from 2 nm – 50 nm. Ionosilicas belong to the mesoporous organosilicas materials, but are more specifically constituted by ionic substructures.

Ionosilicas are synthesized by hydrolysis-polycondensation reactions or post synthesis grafting procedures involving ionic precursors. Due to their mixed mineral-ionic nature, ionosilicas are situated at the interface of silica hybrid materials and ionic liquids. Similarly to conventional functional silica based materials, two classes of ionosilicas can be distinguished, depending on the way the ionic group is anchored to the silica support and where it is located. Surface functionalized ionosilicas contain ionic groups located on the materials’ surface and can be obtained either via ‘one-pot’ co-condensation reactions or post grafting procedures. On the other side, periodic mesoporous ionosilicas, belonging to the PMO family, are produced starting from oligosilylated ionic precursors.

Ionosilicas are synthesized via hydrolysis-polycondensation reactions involving ionic precursors. The ionic nature of these compounds has deep influence on the mechanism of the formation of the solid. Ionosilicas with regular architectures are often formed in the presence of anionic surfactants. This behaviour displays the formation of precursor-surfactant ion pairs in the hydrolysis polycondensation mixture.

These hybrid ionosilicas display very specific and unusual surface properties such as high hydrophilicity and high water-affinity. These features can efficiently be varied both via the cation and the anion, resulting in an ability to fine-tune the properties of these materials. Ionosilicas are functional materials for applications in (organo-)catalysis and separation.
