= Jeong Myeong-hui =

South Korean politician (born 1966)

- 정명희

Mayor of Buk-gu
- Incumbent
- Assumed office 1 July 2018
- Preceded by: Hwang Jae-gwan

Member of Busan Metropolitan Council
- In office 1 July 2014 – 30 June 2018

Personal details
- Born: 2 May 1966 (age 60)
- Party: Democratic
- Education: Pusan National University; Kyungsung University

Korean name
- Hangul: 정명희
- Hanja: 鄭明姬
- RR: Jeong Myeonghui
- MR: Chŏng Myŏnghŭi

Jeong Myeong-hui (Korean: 정명희; born 2 May 1966) is a South Korean pharmacist-turned politician serving as the mayor of Buk District of Busan and its first woman mayor from July 2018.

== Political career ==
Jeong, along with Busanjin District Mayor Seo Eunsuk and Geumjeong District Mayor Jeong Mi-yeong, was elected as the first woman mayor of their respective district in Busan in the 2018 election where 13 out of 16 autonomous districts/counties including Buk-gu have their first mayors not from People Power Party or its preceding parties.

In the 2014 election, Jeong was placed as the number 2 of Democratic Party's proportional list for Busan Metropolitan Council. During four years from 2014 to 2018, she served as the only democratic member of the Council.

In the 2018 election, she defeated two-term Mayor of the district, Hwang Jae-gwan (Korean: 황재관) from the main opposition party.

Jeon was previously vice chair of Democratic Party's Policy Planning Committee and the spokesperson of Busan branch of the party. She was also active in civil societies serving as a board member of Busan Pharmaceutical Association from 2011 to 2014 and the president of its Jung District branch from 2012 to 2016.

Jeong holds two degrees in Pharmacy - a bachelor from Pusan National University and a master's from Kyungsung University where she also completed a doctorate programme.

== Electoral history ==
Election	Year	Post	Party affiliation	Votes	Percentage of votes	Results
6th Local Election	2014	Member of Busan Metropolitan Council (proportional representation)	New Politics Alliance for Democracy (NPAD)	520,414	32.84%	Won
7th Local Election	2018	Mayor of Buk District, Busan	Democratic Party	84,363	56.5%	Won
