= Seo Ki-seog =

Former Justice of the Constitutional Court of Korea

Seo Ki-Seog
- 서기석
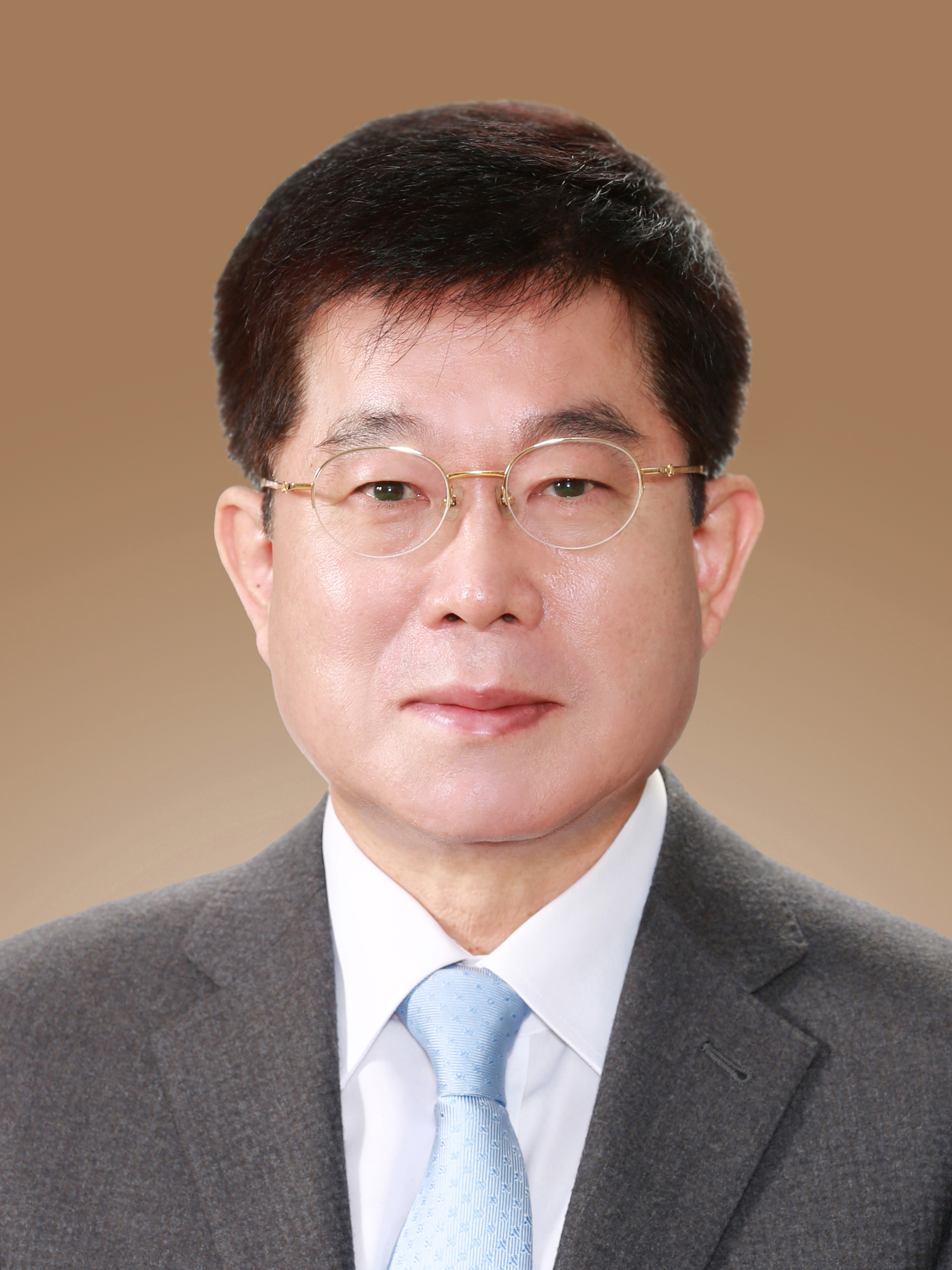

Justice of the Constitutional Court of Korea
- In office April 2013 – April 2019

Personal details
- Born: 19 February 1953 (age 73)
- Education: Seoul National University (LL.B.)

Seo Ki-Seog is a South Korean judge. He was appointed to be Justice of the Constitutional Court of Korea in 2013

== Early life ==
Seo Ki-seok was born in Hamyang-gun, Gyeongsangnam Province, on February 19, 1953. He graduated from Gyeongnam High School and Seoul National University, School of Law.

== Career ==
He served as a military judge advocate. He was appointed as a judge at the Southern Branch of the Seoul District Court in 1981. He presided over various courts and headed the Constitutional Court's research department. He is a research judge at the Supreme Court. He served as senior presiding judge at the Daejeon District Court, Seoul Administrative Court, and Seoul High Court.

He worked as a research judge at the Supreme Court. He served as senior presiding judge at the Daejeon District Court, the Seoul Administrative Court, and the Seoul High Court. He was a chief judge of Cheongju District Court, the Suwon District Court, and the Seoul Central District Court. He co-authored legal texts.

== Major cases ==
As chief judge at the Seoul Administrative Court, in a case involving a US military armored vehicle, he ruled that "the prosecution's investigation records and case records relating to the death of a middle school girl must be disclosed".

While serving as a judge in the Constitutional Court, in a Constitutional Review Case (2015) he held that the Road Traffic Act provision penalizing driving under the influence of alcohol, in conjunction with Kim Yi-soo, who was considered a relative progressive within the Constitutional Court. He disagreed with the majority opinion, stating that "the police authority cannot, in principle, interfere in private life, and special titles," and that "the principle of prohibiting excess, which states that the scope of public authority intervention must be kept to a minimum", it must not be ignored.

On February 19, 2018, Seo Ki-suk visited the Faculty of Law of the University of São Paulo in Brazil and gave a special lecture on the topic of, "History, System, and Decisions of the Korean Constitutional Court" for about 100 students, and local legal professionals. Judge Lewandowski of the Supreme Court of the Republic of Brazil participated in the lecture. The judge presided over the impeachment proceedings against former Brazilian President Dilma Rousseff in August 2016 as Chief Justice of the Supreme Court.

=== Timeline ===
- 1981: Judge, Southern Branch of Seoul District Court
- 1983: Judge, Seoul Civil District Court
- 1985': Judge, Chungmu Branch of Masan District Court
- 1987: Judge, Eastern Branch of Seoul District Court
- 1989: Judge, Seoul Criminal District Court
- 1991: Judge, Seoul High Court
- March 1991 to April 1992: Visiting Scholar, Keio University, Japan
- 1994: Research Judge, Supreme Court
- 1998: Senior Judge, Incheon District Court
- 1999: Chief Constitution Research Officer, Constitutional Court of Korea
- 2002: Senior Judge, Seoul Administrative Court
- 2004: Senior Judge, Daejeon High Court
- 2005: Senior Judge, Seoul High Court
- 2010: Chief Senior Judge, Seoul High Court
- 2010: Chief Judge, Cheongju District Court
- 2012: Chief Judge, Suwon District Court
- 2013: Chief Judge, Seoul Central District Court
- 2013: Justice, Constitutional Court (term end in April 2019)

Legal offices
Preceded by Song Doo-hwan	Justice of the Constitutional Court of Korea; 2013–2019	Succeeded by Lee Mison
