= Samsung T9000 =

Smart refrigerator manufactured by Samsung

- Type: Smart refrigerator
- Inception: 2013
- Manufacturer: Samsung Electronics

The Samsung T9000 is a smart refrigerator that runs Android, made by Samsung Electronics and introduced along with a soda-making fridge in CES 2013. It was succeeded by the Samsung Family Hub refrigerator line which runs Tizen. In early 2014, Samsung released the Samsung Smart Home app and service, now called Samsung SmartThings and added support for this fridge as one of the many supported Samsung devices.

== Fridge ==
The 32-cubic feet fridge itself has a lot of space in four compartments, each with its own temperature setting. Two can be configured as freezers, or just one, and up to three as refrigerators. The refrigerator costed $4,000. Temperature can be set on the screen.

== Display ==
The unit includes a 10-inch display that can display weather information, a calendar, notes set by other fridge users, and news.

== Applications ==
The fridge can also run applications such as Evernote which syncs to a mobile device. Sharing photos could be done via an Evernote software update. Another included app is Epicurious. The user lists the fridge’s contents, then the app suggests recipes using the contents of the fridge. A Google Calendar account could be linked via the Google Calendar app and calendars could be shown side-by-side. Events could be added by typing on the screen. Twitter is included. However, user defined Android apps, such as Angry Birds Star Wars cannot be installed.

== User interface ==
The app screen has a list of application icons at the bottom of the screen. Memos can be written, AP news can be viewed, the calendar can be updated, and can be customized with photos uploaded via an external SD card, Google’s Picasa, or through Samsung’s AllShare program. Google Calendar could be added and calendars could be shown side-by-side. Events could be added by typing on the screen. The fridge has the ability to track expiry dates. However, expiry dates are set by regulatory bodies. Samsung claims its fridges' advanced cooling technology can keep food fresh for far longer than others.

== Controversy ==
See Smart refrigerator#Support.
