= Eunseong Kim =

South Korean physicist (born 1971)

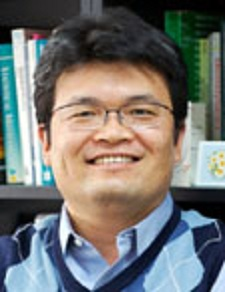
- Born: 1971 (age 54–55); Gogeum Island, Goheung-gun, Jeollanam-do, South Korea
- Education: Pusan National University (B.S. 1998); Penn State University (Ph.D. 2004)
- Known for: The discovery of the supersolid quantum state of matter
- Awards: Lee Osheroff Richardson North American Science Prize; Young Scientist Award; Yumin Awards (Science)
- Scientific career
- Fields: Low temperature physics, supersolid
- Workplaces: KAIST
- Doctoral advisor: Moses H. W. Chan

Korean name
- Hangul: 김은성
- RR: Gim Eunseong
- MR: Kim Ŭnsŏng

Eunseong Kim is a South Korean physicist. He is an experimental low temperature physicist. Along with his advisor Moses H. W. Chan, he saw the first phenomena which were interpreted as supersolid behavior. In 2008, Kim was awarded the Lee Osheroff Richardson North American Science Prize, from Oxford Instruments for his contributions to the understanding of solid helium.

== Bibliography ==
Kim was born on the small island of Geogeum-do in southern South Korea and attended Pusan National University. After completing his mandatory 26 months of military service, he returned to the university and obtained a B.S. degree in physics in 1998. He spent one year as a graduate student at the same university, and then moved to Penn State University in 1999. He studied low-temperature physics and obtained his Ph.D. in 2004 under the supervision of Moses H. W. Chan.

Kim joined the Korea Advanced Institute of Science and Technology (KAIST) in 2006. Since then, he has been working on various low-temperature quantum phenomena. Since July 2007, he has been the director of the Center for Supersolid and Quantum Matter Research at KAIST.

== Research ==
When he was a post doctor of Chan's group, they saw the first phenomenon which was interpreted as supersolid behavior. Later, Kim reported a new evidence of supersolidity in rotating solid helium. He found that Non-Classical Rotational Inertia (NCRI) fraction which measures shows that the fraction of helium atoms participating in the super flow and the helium atoms can be strongly suppressed by rotation without altering the elastic properties.

== Awards ==
- In 2008, Kim was awarded the Lee Osheroff Richardson North American Science Prize, from Oxford Instruments for his contributions to the understanding of solid helium.
- In 2011, he received the Young Scientist Award by the International Union of Pure and Applied Physics(C5) and the Yumin Awards (Science).
