= Lee Mison =

Justice of the Constitutional Court of Korea

- 이미선
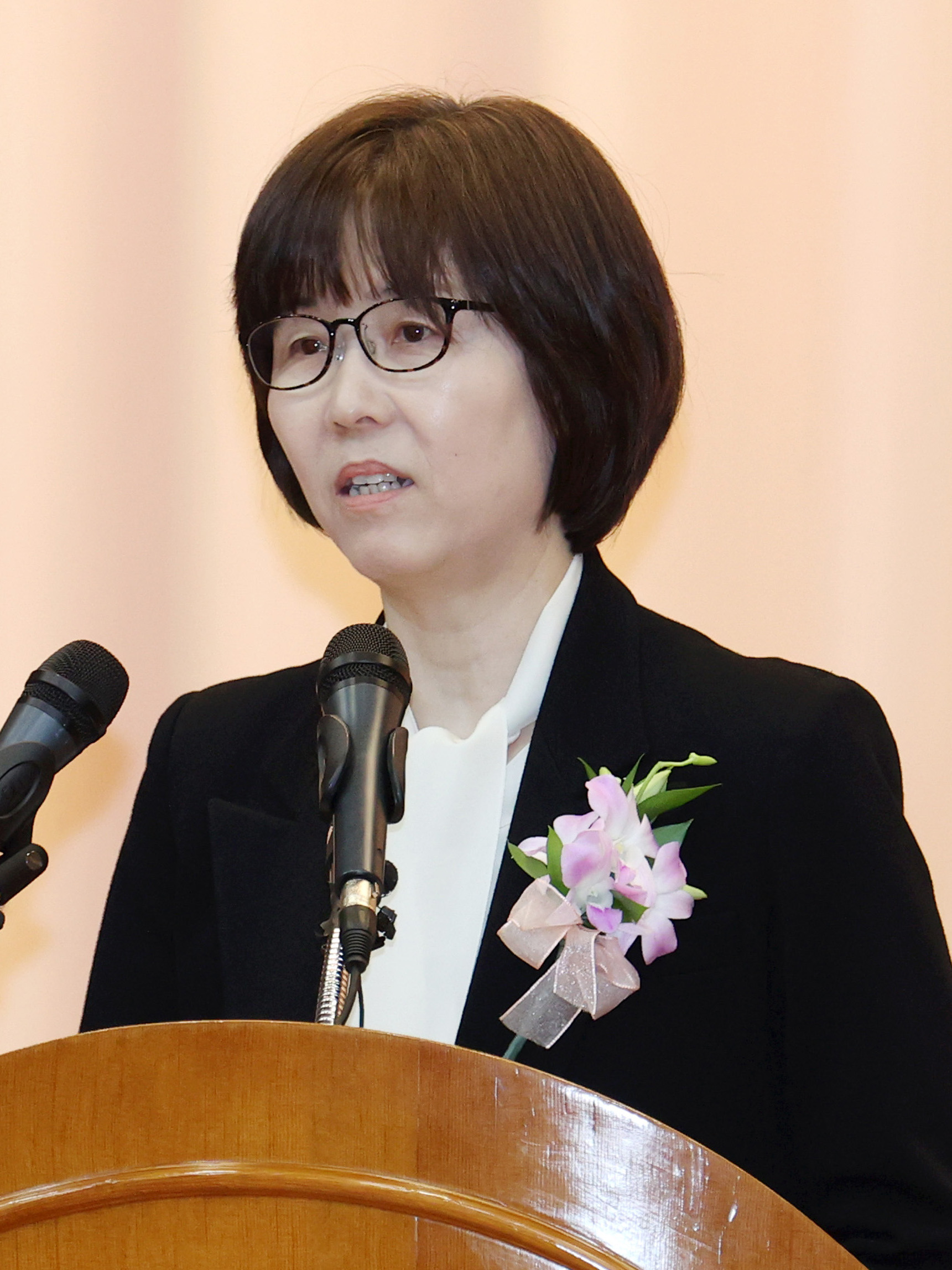
- Lee in 2025

Justice of the Constitutional Court of Korea
- In office 19 April 2019 – 18 April 2025
- Appointed by: Moon Jae-in

Personal details
- Born: 18 January 1970 (age 56)
- Education: Pusan National University

Korean name
- Hangul: 이미선
- RR: I Miseon
- MR: I Misŏn

Lee Mison (Korean: 이미선; born 18 January 1970) is a South Korean judge. She was appointed to Justice of the Constitutional Court of Korea in 2019.

== Career ==
- 1994 36th National Bar Examination
- 1997 Judicial Research & Training Institute
- 1997 Judge, Seoul District Court
- 2001 Judge, Cheongju District Court
- 2005 Judge, Suwon District Court
- 2006 Judge, Daejeon High Court
- 2009 Judge, Daejeon District Court
- 2010 Research Judge, Supreme Court
- 2015 Presiding Judge, Suwon District Court
- 2017 Presiding Judge, Seoul Central District Court
- 2019 Justice of the Constitutional Court of Korea

Legal offices
Preceded by Seo Ki-seog	Justice of the Constitutional Court of Korea; 2019–2025	Vacant
