= Smart refrigerator =

Internet-connected refrigerator

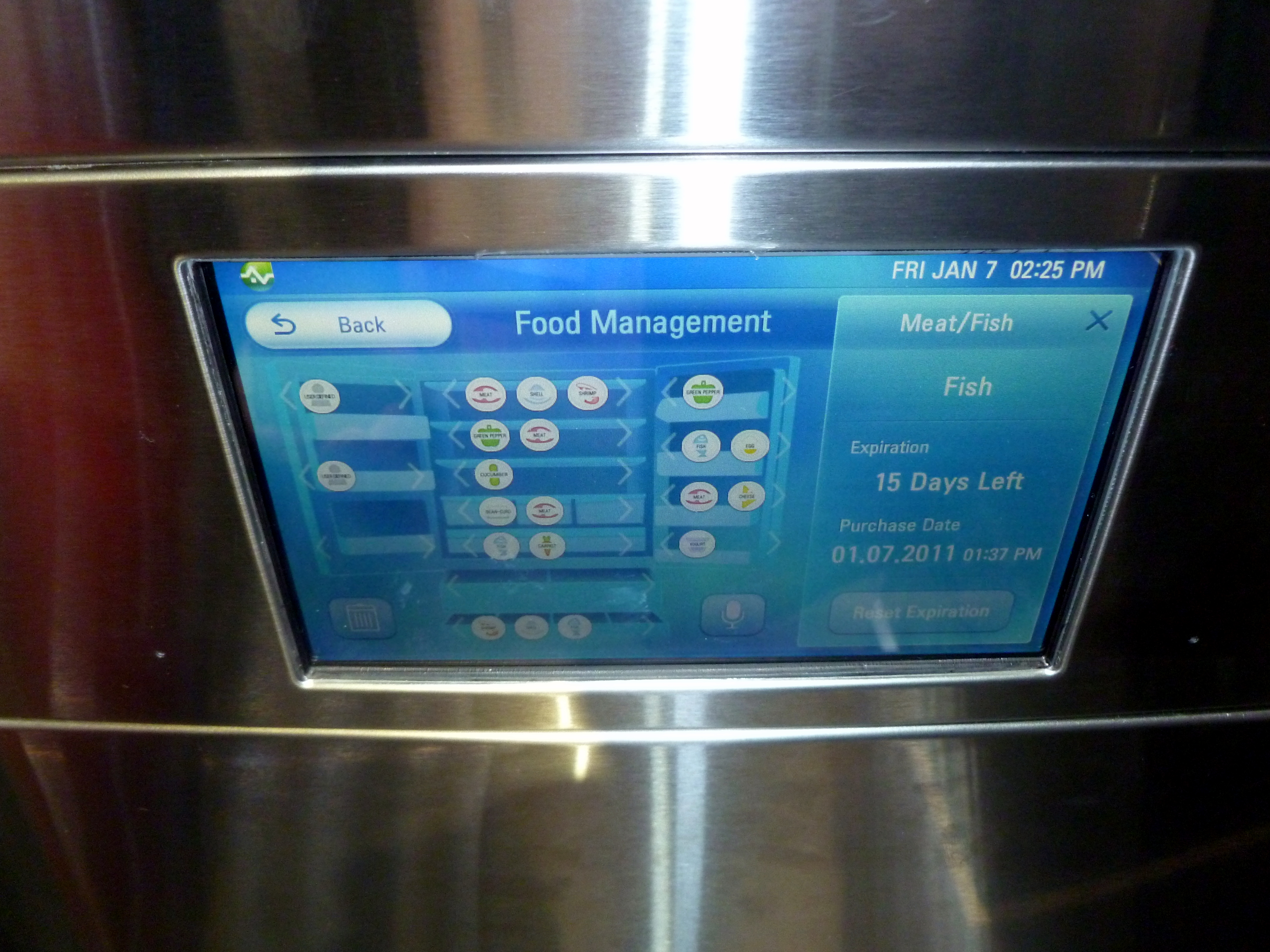
LG Smart Refrigerator at CES 2011

A smart refrigerator, also known as an internet refrigerator, is a refrigerator with network connectivity and computing functions that can provide features beyond conventional temperature-controlled food storage. Research on smart refrigerators has included systems for monitoring stored food, tracking inventory, identifying items and notifying users when supplies are running low.

Proposed systems use technologies including sensors, cameras, Internet of Things connectivity and image recognition to automate parts of food-inventory management. A 2021 IEEE study, for example, tested a smart-refrigerator inventory system using multiple cameras and convolutional neural networks to identify objects entering and leaving a refrigerator.

== History ==
Internet-connected refrigerators emerged commercially around the beginning of the 21st century. In June 2000, LG Electronics introduced the Internet Digital DIOS, an internet-connected refrigerator equipped with a display and network connectivity. The model had a price of more than US$20,000.

Later research expanded the concept from providing internet access through a refrigerator to managing the food stored inside it. Systems described in the research literature have included automatic collection of food information, shopping-list generation, recipe recommendations and inventory monitoring.

== Controversy ==
=== Security ===
Security concerns about internet-connected household appliances accompanied their early development. In June 2000, The Register reported warnings from Kaspersky Lab that internet-connected appliances, including refrigerators, could eventually become targets for computer viruses as development tools for such platforms became available.

In January 2014, security company Proofpoint reported an Internet of Things attack campaign involving more than 750,000 malicious emails originating from over 100,000 consumer devices. The compromised devices included routers, multimedia centres, televisions and at least one refrigerator.

In August 2015, Pen Test Partners reported a vulnerability affecting the internet-connected Samsung RF28HMELBSR refrigerator. The vulnerability concerned the refrigerator's implementation of SSL when connecting to Google services and could be exploited to obtain users' Google login credentials.

=== Support ===
Owners of some internet-connected Samsung refrigerators encountered problems with their Google Calendar integration after changes to Google's calendar service. Reports published in 2015 described users being unable to sign into Google Calendar through the refrigerators and the difficulty of maintaining software-dependent features in connected appliances.

== Examples ==
Examples of internet-connected or smart refrigerators have included:

- Electrolux ScreenFridge
- LG Internet Digital DIOS
- LG GR-D267DTU
- LG Smart ThinQ LFX31995ST
- Samsung RH2777AT HomePAD Internet Refrigerator
- Samsung T9000
- Samsung Zipel e-Diary
- Whirlpool GD5VVAXT Refrigerator

== Popular culture ==
The television series Silicon Valley featured an internet-connected refrigerator in its fourth season. In the episode "The Patent Troll", Jian-Yang buys a smart refrigerator whose software is subsequently modified by Gilfoyle. In the season finale, "Server Error", a network of smart refrigerators becomes part of the plot involving Pied Piper's decentralised internet project.

Internet refrigerator as seen in the science fiction film The 6th Day

- The 2000 film The 6th Day, features an Internet refrigerator which informs Arnold Schwarzenegger that the milk is over its expiring date and asks him to confirm a new order.
- The 2004 film The Stepford Wives, features a smart refrigerator that can tell whenever it has no juice, etc. in Joanna's new Stepford home.
- The 2012 film Total Recall, features a smart refrigerator that is covered by a touchscreen which enables the user to leave notes and messages.
- Silicon Valley features a smart fridge that is bought by Jian-Yang, after the old refrigerator broke down in Season 4 episode, "The Patent Troll". The smart refrigerator is able to communicate in friendly male voice and give a warning if the food items are expired, which bothers Gilfoyle enough to hack it. In season 4 finale, "Server Error", thanks to his hacking, Pied Piper's plan for the new Internet is proven by the 30,000 smart refrigerators connected together that create the new Internet, as he hacked using some of their code, replacing his dead server, Anton, who backed itself up to the smart refrigerator before it died.
