= Internet Digital DIOS =

LG Electronics internet refrigerator

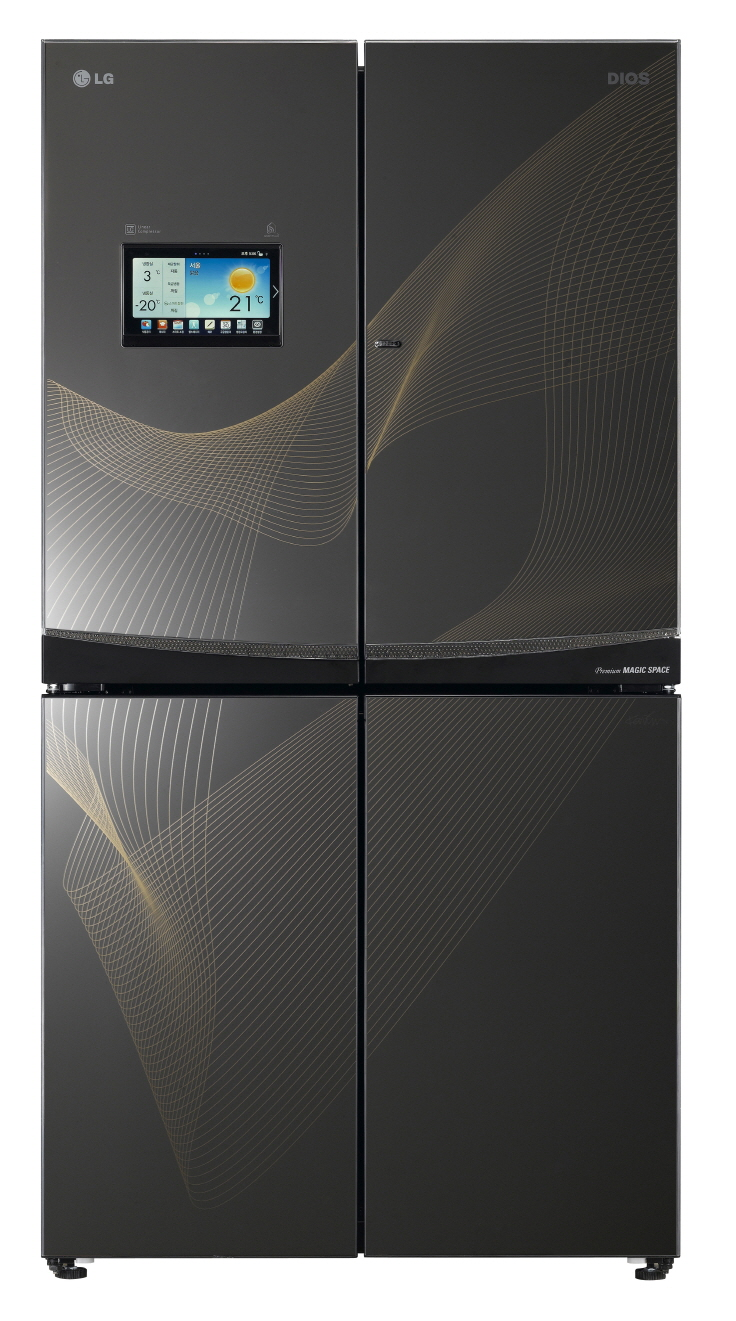
- Type: Internet refrigerator
- Inception: June 2000
- Manufacturer: LG Electronics

The LG Internet Digital DIOS (also known as R-S73CT) is an internet refrigerator released by LG Electronics in June 2000. The technology is the result of a project that started in 1997 and staffed by a team of 55 researchers with a budget cost of 15 billion won (US$49.2 million).

== Features ==
The refrigerator has a TFT-LCD (thin-film transistor-liquid crystal display) screen with TV functionality and Local Area Network (LAN) port. It includes a LCD information window that features electronic pen, data memo, video messaging and schedule management functions and provides information, such as inside temperature, the freshness of stored foods, nutrition information and recipes. Other features are a webcam that is used as a scanner and tracks what is inside the refrigerator, a MP3 player and a three-level automatic icemaker. In addition, the electricity consumption is half the level of conventional refrigerators and the noise level is only 23 decibels.
