= Priority Material Office =

Priority Material Office, U.S. Pacific Fleet
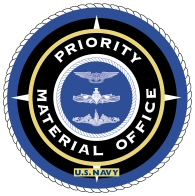
- Emblem of the PMO
- Active: 1964–present
- Country: United States of America
- Branch: United States Navy
- Type: US Navy
- Garrison/HQ: Naval Base Kitsap
- Nickname: PMOHQ

Commanders
- Current commander: Commander Robert D. Salire

Established on 16 April 1964 as the Pacific Fleet Polaris Material Office (PMOPAC), the Priority Material Office (PMO) is headquartered at Naval Base Kitsap, Bremerton, Washington. PMO is a U.S. Naval command under the operational control of the Commander, Submarine Force, U. S. Pacific Fleet (COMSUBPAC). PMO is charged with providing dedicated logistics support to Pacific and Atlantic Fleet submarine forces, surface ship forces, Marine Corps, Coast Guard, and Military Sealift Command (MSC) units.

== History ==
The Priority Material Office (PMO) initially commissioned as the Pacific Fleet Polaris Material Office (PMOPAC) on 16 April 1964. It has served since its inception under the operational control of Commander, Submarine Force, U.S. Pacific Fleet (COMSUBPAC), and was originally established to support the Fleet Ballistic Missile (FBM) submarines and their tenders. In 1982, PMOPAC began expediting critical repair parts for both ashore and afloat commands of the entire Pacific Submarine Fleet. In 1994, PMOPAC was renamed the Submarine Logistics Support Center (SUBLOGSUPPCEN) to better reflect its changing mission. In this expanded role, SUBLOGSUPPCEN developed Prime, a specialized web-based application which provides current and historical information on every requisition processed. In 1998, SUBLOGSUPPCEN's customer base further expanded, expediting for the Pacific Fleet surface ships and MSC. In April 2000, the command was renamed "Priority Material Office" to better reflect its new, broader mission.

== Subordinate organizations ==
=== East Region detachments ===
- PMO Det. Norfolk, Virginia
- PMO Det. Groton, Connecticut
- PMO Det. Kings Bay, George
- PMO Det. Mayport, Florida
- PMO Det. Manama, Bahrain
- PMO Det. Sigonella, Sicily
- PMO Det. Susquehanna, Pennsylvania

=== West Region detachments ===
- PMO Det. Pearl Harbor, Hawaii
- PMO Det. San Diego, California
- PMO Det. Yokosuka, Japan
- PMO Det. Agana, Guam
- PMO Det. Travis AFB, California

== Commanding Officers/Officers-in-Charge serving at PMO ==
=== Officers-in-Charge ===
- Capt S.L. Scharf Jr. 1964 – 1967
- Capt J.H. Kamps 1967 – 1970
- Capt R.C. Bliss 1970 – 1974
- LCDR S.W. Baldwin 1974 – 1975
- Capt S.J. Deroches 1975
- CDR D.D. Leeson 1975 – 1978
- CDR C.R. Kiger 1978 – 1979
- LCDR D.S. Bary 1979
- CDR W.E. Redman 1979 – 1981
- CDR R.C. Rieve 1981 – 1983
- CDR R.E. Lewis 1983 – 1984

=== Commanding Officers ===
- CDR R.E. Lewis 1984 – 1985
- CDR B.A. Colvin 1985 – 1987
- CDR J.E. Schweichler 1987 – 1991
- CDR P.M. Evans 1991 – 1994
- LCDR M.R. Bonnette 1994 – 1997
- CDR J.P. Costello 1997 – 2000
- CDR W.G. Baker 2000 – 2003
- CDR J.K. Grimes 2003 – 2006
- CDR J.B. Haynes 2006 – 2009
- CDR M.D. Havens 2009 – 2012
- CDR J.C. Statler 2012 – 2015
- CDR P.W. DeMeyer 2015–2018
- CDR J.C. Pestar Jr. 2018-2020
- CDR J.P. Holdorf 2020–2021
- CDR R. D. Salire 2021–Present
