= Pusan National University =

National University of Busan and Gyeongsangnam-do, Republic of Korea

Coordinates: 35°14′02″N 129°04′46″E

- 부산대학교
- Motto: 진리, 자유, 봉사
- Motto in English: Truth, Freedom, Service
- Type: National
- Established: 1946; 80 years ago
- Academic affiliations: APRU
- President: Choi Jae Weon (최재원)
- Academic staff: 839 (full-time)
- Undergraduates: 17,347
- Postgraduates: 9,138
- Location: Busan, Yangsan, and Miryang, South Korea
- Campus: Urban, Rural
- Mascot: Sanjinee (산지니)
- Website: www.pusan.ac.kr
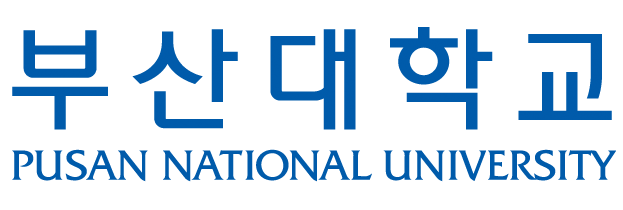

Korean name
- Hangul: 부산대학교
- Hanja: 釜山大學校
- RR: Busan daehakgyo
- MR: Pusan taehakkyo

University rankings
JoongAng National	Domestic	24
QS National	General	16
THE National	General	14–17
ARWU National	Research	9–12
QS Asia (Asia version)	General	=81
THE Asia (Asia version)	General	=99
USNWR Asia	General	=205
ARWU World	Research	401–500
QS World	General	=473
THE World	General	501–600
USNWR World	General	=709

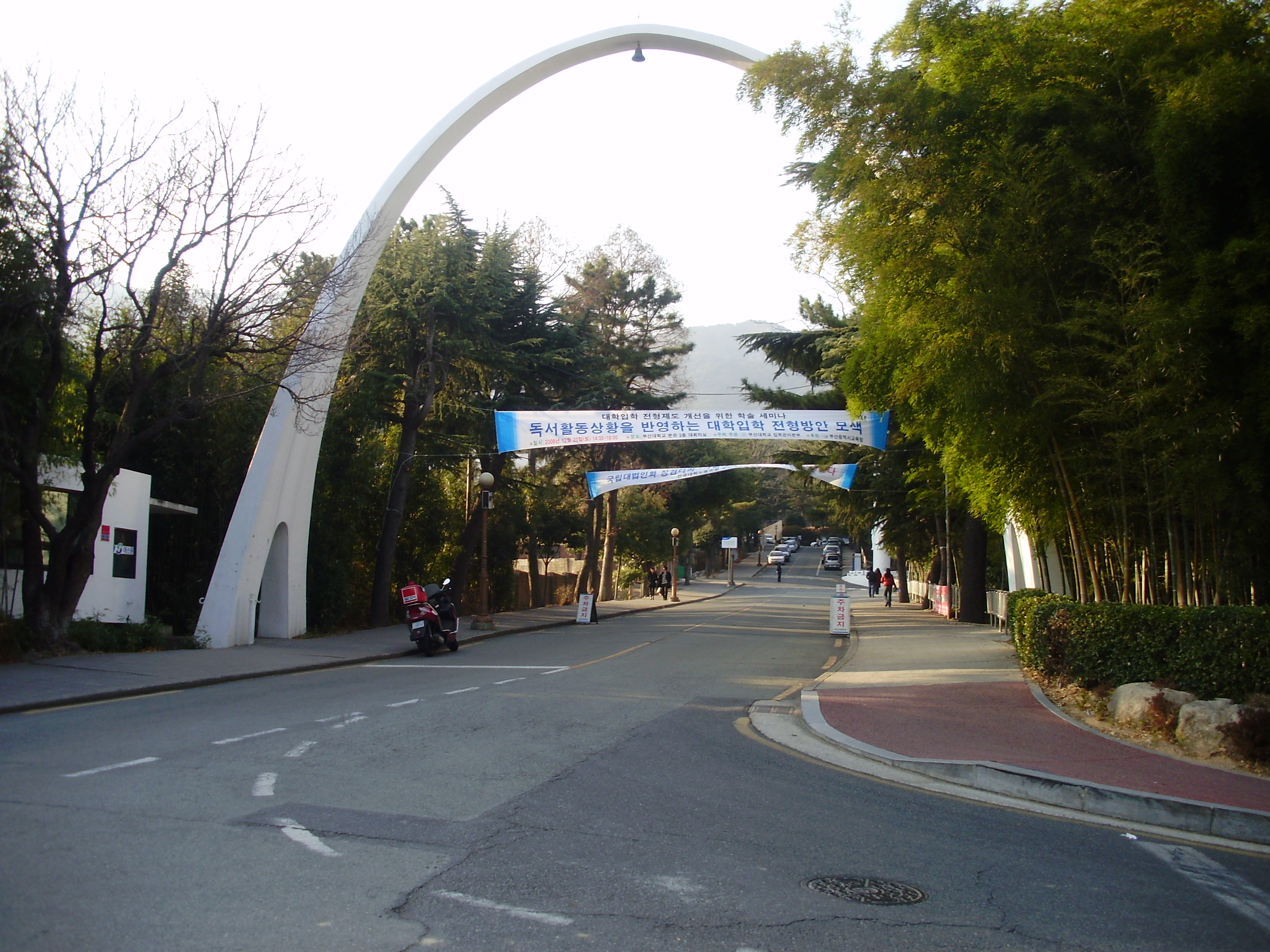
Pusan National University

Pusan National University (PNU; Korean: 부산대학교, also called Busan National University) is one of ten Flagship Korean National Universities in South Korea. It is the first national university established after the National Liberation Day of Korea.

There are fours campuses of the university: Busan Campus, Ami Campus, Miryang Campus and Yangsan Campus. They are located in Busan (Korean: 부산; MR: Pusan) and South Gyeongsang Province.

== Notable alumni ==
- Bae Deok-kwang, politician
- Bae Jae-jung, politician
- Cho Kyoung-tae, politician
- Chung Ui-hwa, politician
- Han Jeoung-ae, politician
- Heo Sung-tae, actor
- Chang-Sik Ha, materials scientist
- Hur Aram, educator
- Im Si-wan, actor and singer (ZE:A)
- Jeong Mi-yeong, politician and mayor of Geumjeong District of Busan
- Jeong Myeong-hui, politician and mayor of Buk District of Busan
- Kang Hyung-ho, singer (Forestella)
- Kang Mal-geum, actress
- Kiggen, singer (Phantom)
- Eunseong Kim, physicist
- Kim Yi-deum, poet
- Lee Jae-yong, actor
- Lee Mison, Justice of the Constitutional Court of Korea
- Yoo Jae-myung, actor
- You Young-min, politician and former Chief of Staff under President Moon Jae-in

== Festivity ==
Busan National University Festival Celebrity List

- May 17–19, 2022 – Spider, Winner
- May 17–18, 2023 – Kim Bum Soo, Oh My Girl / Lee Moo Jin, STAYC
- May 28–30, 2024 – Cravity, Nam Dong Hyun, Cyberger, Dream Girls, New Jeans / (G)I-dle, Zico / QWER, Now A Days, SG Wannabe

== See also ==
- Flagship Korean National Universities
- List of national universities in South Korea
- List of universities and colleges in South Korea
- Education in Korea
