= Zabofloxacin =

Names
- Preferred IUPAC name 1-Cyclopropyl-6-fluoro-7-[(8E)-8-(methoxyimino)-2,6-diazaspiro[3.4]octan-6-yl]-4-oxo-1,4-dihydro-1,8-naphthyridine-3-carboxylic acid
- Other names DW-224a

Identifiers
CAS Number	219680-11-2
3D model (JSmol)	Interactive image
ChemSpider	8128482
PubChem CID	9952872
UNII	LV66BA6V2G
CompTox Dashboard (EPA)	DTXSID10870251
- InChI: InChI=1S/C19H20FN5O4/c1-29-23-14-6-24(9-19(14)7-21-8-19)17-13(20)4-11-15(26)12(18(27)28)5-25(10-2-3-10)16(11)22-17/h4-5,10,21H,2-3,6-9H2,1H3,(H,27,28)/b23-14- Key: ZNPOCLHDJCAZAH-UCQKPKSFSA-N; InChI=1/C19H20FN5O4/c1-29-23-14-6-24(9-19(14)7-21-8-19)17-13(20)4-11-15(26)12(18(27)28)5-25(10-2-3-10)16(11)22-17/h4-5,10,21H,2-3,6-9H2,1H3,(H,27,28)/b23-14- Key: ZNPOCLHDJCAZAH-UCQKPKSFBL
- SMILES: Fc1c(nc2c(c1)C(=O)C(\C(=O)O)=C/N2C3CC3)N5C\C(=N\OC)C4(CNC4)C5

Properties
Chemical formula	C_{19}H_{20}FN_{5}O_{4}
Molar mass	401.392
- Except where otherwise noted, data are given for materials in their standard state (at 25 °C [77 °F], 100 kPa). Infobox references

Zabofloxacin (DW-224a) is an investigational fluoroquinolone antibiotic for multidrug-resistant infections due to Gram-positive bacteria. It also has activity against Neisseria gonorrhoeae including strains that are resistant to other quinolone antibiotics.

Zabofloxacin was discovered by Dong Wha Pharmaceuticals and licensed to Pacific Beach BioSciences for development.

A double-blind, three-arm clinical study of the drug began in March 2010.
