= MPMan =

Late 1990s portable solid state digital audio player

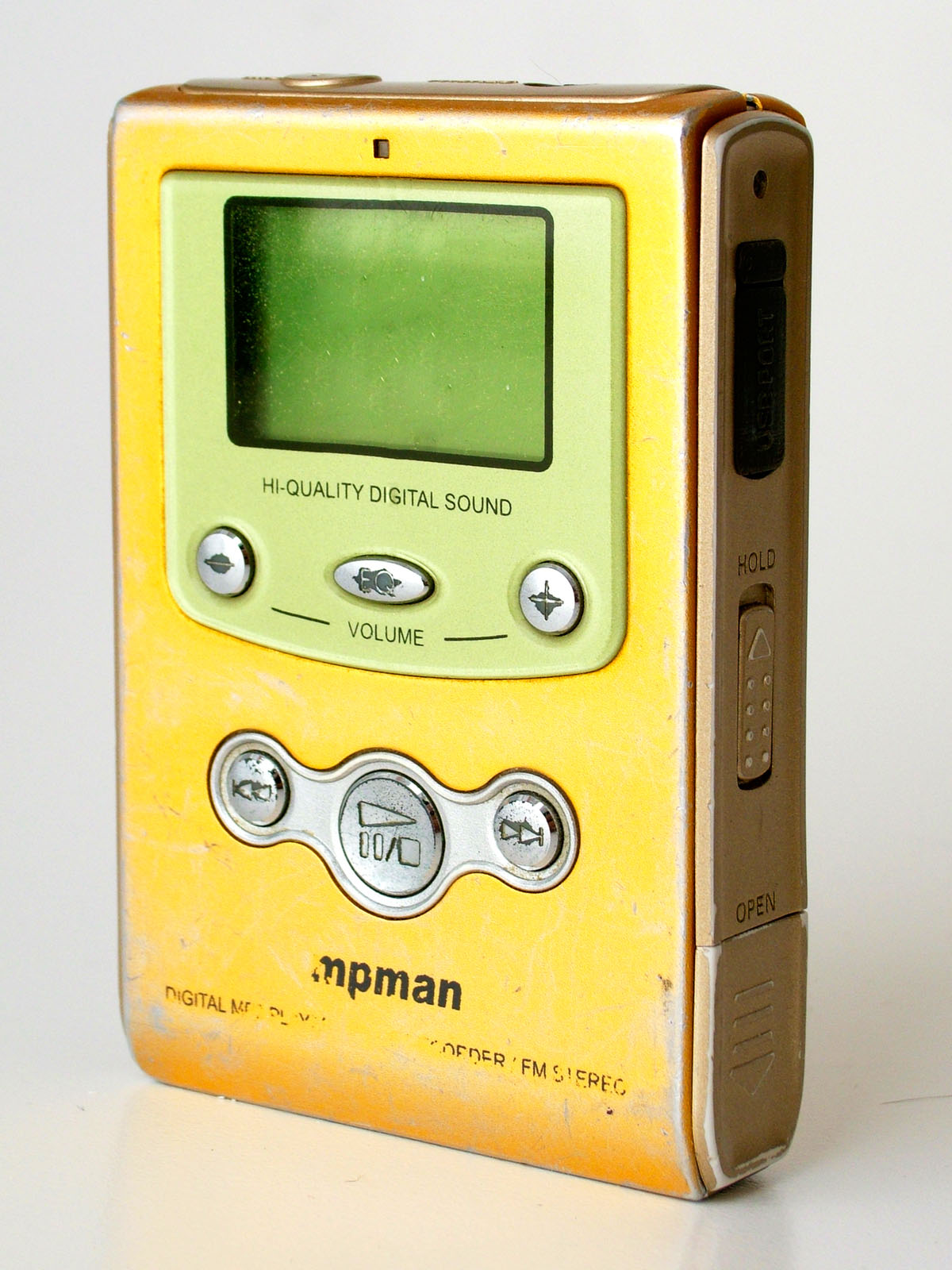
- MPMan MP-f60
- Developer: SaeHan Information Systems
- Type: Portable media player
- Released: March 1998
- Storage: 16/32/64/128 MB

The MPMan music player, manufactured by the South Korean company SaeHan Information Systems, debuted in Asia in March 1998, and was the first mass-produced portable solid state digital audio player.

The internal flash memory could be expanded, but there was no support for external memory. It was delivered with a docking station. To put music into the device, the music first had to be encoded in the mp3 format by an encoder provided by the user, and then transferred via the parallel port to the docking station that connected to the portable player device.

On 2 May 1998 in Japan the Akihabara "Akibaoo~" stores in Chūō, Tokyo started selling 32 MB and 64 MB models, the prices of which were 39 800 yen (circa 400 USD - today $771.66) and 59 800 yen, respectively.

In North America, the South Korean device was first imported for sale by Michael Robertson's Z Company in mid-1998. Around the same time, Eiger Labs, Inc. imported and rebranded the player in two models, the Eiger MPMan F10, and Eiger MPMan F20.

Owners could upgrade the memory from 32 MB to 64 MB by sending the player back to Eiger Labs with a cheque for 69 + 7.95 USD shipping. A compact device, it measured 90 mm tall by 70 mm wide by 16.5 mm thick and weighed a little over 65 grams. The US price in 1998 for the F10 model with 32 MB flash memory was circa 200 - 250 USD.

The Eiger MPMan F20 was a similar model that used 3.3 V SmartMedia cards for expansion, and ran on a single AA battery, instead of rechargeable NiMH batteries.

== Technical data MPMan MP F-10 ==
- Player device:
  - Memory: 16/32/64/128 (MP-F60 T12) MB
  - Dimensions: 16.5 mm thick, 70 mm wide, 90 mm tall
  - Weight: 65 grams (without battery)
  - Signal/Noise ratio: 70 dB
  - Distortion rate: 0.1%
  - Maximum output: 5 mW
  - Output Connector: 3.5 mm stereo TRS connector for headphones
  - Frequency response: 20 – 20,000 Hz
  - Power Supply: Rechargeable Battery (gum type DC 1.2V 1000mAh x 2)
  - Power Supply (MP-F60 T12): (Rechargeable) AA Battery DC 1.5V x 1
  - Available colors: Gold, Pink, Silver, Skeleton black, Blue
- Docking station:
  - Dimensions: 30 mm thick, 133 mm x 110 mm
  - Weight: 80 grams
  - Power: DC 9V 400mA (AC adapter included)

== Technical data MPMan MP-F60 T12 ==
- Player device:
  - Memory: 16/32/64/128 MB
  - Dimensions: 16.5 mm thick, 70 mm wide, 90 mm tall
  - Weight: 65 grams (without battery)
  - Signal/Noise ratio: 70 dB
  - Distortion rate: 0.1%
  - Maximum output: 5 mW
  - Output Connector: 4 pin 3.5 mm stereo TRS connector for headphones and wired remote.
  - Frequency response: 20 – 20,000 Hz
  - Power Supply: one DC 1.5V (Rechargeable) AA Battery
  - Available colors: Gold, Pink, Silver, Skeleton black, Blue

Audio recording function and AM / FM radio.

Memory expansion by Smart Media Cards.

== Critical reception ==
The Recording Industry Association of America's (RIAA) Associate Director of Anti-Copyright infringement initially said the MPMan had "no function other than playing material that was stolen from record companies". Nevertheless, he later said it was "a unique device. It's something that we haven't seen on the market before".
