= Moses H. W. Chan =

Chinese-American physicist

- 陳鴻渭
- Born: November 23, 1946 (age 79); Xi'an, China
- Education: Bridgewater College (BSC), Cornell University (Ph.D.)
- Known for: Research in Low temperature physics, on solid 4He.
- Awards: Fritz London Memorial Prize (1996)
- Scientific career
- Fields: Condensed matter physics, Low temperature physics
- Workplaces: Penn State University
- Doctoral advisor: John Reppy

Moses Chan Hung-Wai (Chinese: 陳鴻渭; pinyin: Chén Hóngwèi) is a Chinese-American physicist who is Evan Pugh Professor at Pennsylvania State University. He was a postdoctoral associate at Duke University and has been a professor at Penn State University Park since 1979.

Through the years, Chan's work has spanned many diverse topics. For his numerous contributions to low-temperature physics, in 1996 he shared the prestigious Fritz London Memorial prize with Carl Wieman and Eric A. Cornell. He was elected a member of the National Academy of Sciences in 2000, and a fellow of the American Academy of Arts and Sciences in 2004.

Chan is known for the experimental discovery of evidence for a new supersolid quantum state of matter, predicted theoretically in 1969 by Alexander Andreev and Ilya Liftshitz, and its subsequent refutation. Other significant discoveries include the experimental observation of Critical Casimir effect and the experimental confirmation of 2D Ising model.

== Biography ==
Born in Xi'an in 1946, he moved to Hong Kong in his childhood and completed his primary and secondary education in Yuen Long District. In 1967, Chan received his bachelor's degree from Bridgewater College in Virginia, United States. From 1969 to 1970, he taught at the University of Hong Kong. In 1974, he received his doctorate from Cornell University. From 1973 to 1976, he conducted postdoctoral research at Duke University. From 1976 to 1979, Chen taught at the University of Toledo. In 1979, he joined Pennsylvania State University.

== Honors ==
He received the Guggenheim Fellowship in 1986 and the Fritz London Memorial Prize in 1996. He was elected a Fellow of the American Physical Society in 1987, a member of the National Academy of Sciences in 2000, a member of the American Academy of Arts and Sciences in 2004, and a Fellow of the American Association for the Advancement of Science in 2007.
