= Busan Metropolitan Council =

Local council of Busan, South Korea

Busan Metropolitan Council 부산광역시의회
- 9th Busan Metropolitan Council

Type
- Type: Unicameral

History
- Founded: 8 July 1991

Leadership
- Chairman: Ahn Seong-min, People Power
- Vice Chairman: Park Jung-muk, People Power
- Vice Chairman: Lee Dae-seok, People Power

Structure
- Seats: 47
- Political groups: People Power (45) Democratic (2)
- Length of term: 4 years

Elections
- Voting system: Parallel voting: First-past-the-post (42 seats); Party-list proportional representation (5 seats)
- Last election: 1 June 2022

Website
- Busan Metropolitan Council (Korean); Busan Metropolitan Council (English)

- Busan Metropolitan Council
- Hangul: 부산광역시의회
- Hanja: 釜山廣域市議會
- RR: Busan-gwangyeoksi uihoe
- MR: Pusan-gwangyŏksi ŭihoe

The Busan Metropolitan Council (Korean: 부산광역시의회) is the local council of Busan, South Korea.

There is a total of 47 members, with 42 members elected in the First-past-the-post voting system and 5 members elected in Party-list proportional representation.

== Current composition ==
Political party	Seats
People Power	45
Democratic	2
Total	47

Negotiation groups can be formed by five or more members. There are currently two negotiation groups in the council, formed by the Democratic Party of Korea and the Liberty Korea Party.

== Organization ==
The structure of Council consists of:

- Chairman
- Two Vice Chairmen
- Standing Committees
  - Steering Committee
  - Plannung and Administration Committee
  - Economy and Culture Committee
  - Welfare and Environmental Committee
  - Maritime Affairs and Transportation Committee
  - Urban Safety Committee
  - Education Committee
- Special Committee
  - Special Committee on Buddet & Accounts
  - Special Committee on Ethics
  - Special Committee on Decentralization
  - Special Committee on Local Economy
- Council Secretariat
  - Secretary General
    - General Affairs Division
      - General Affairs
      - Management
    - Proceedings Division
      - Proceedings
      - Bill Records
    - Public Relations Division
      - Public Relations
      - News
    - Legislative Policy Division
      - Legislations
      - Policy Research
    - Expert Commissioners
      - Steering Committee
      - Plannung and Administration Committee
      - Economy and Culture Committee
      - Welfare and Environmental Committee
      - Maritime Affairs and Transportation Committee
      - Urban Safety Committee
      - Education Committee

== Recent election results ==
=== 2018 ===
Summary of the 13 June 2018 Busan Metropolitan Council election results
Party	Constituency				Party list				Total seats	
Party	Votes	%	Seats	±	Votes	%	Seats	±	Seats	±
Democratic Party of Korea	889,481	53.02	38	▲38	825,832	48.81	3	▲1	41	▲39
Liberty Korea Party	690,812	41.17	4	▼38	621,446	36.73	2	▼1	6	▼39
Bareunmirae Party	54,744	3.26	0	new	113,881	6.73	0	new	0	new
Justice Party	2,085	0.12	0	0	92,157	5.44	0	0	0	0
Green Party Korea	—				11,915	0.70	0	0	0	0
Minjung Party	8,831	0.53	0	new	11,833	0.69	0	new	0	new
Korean Patriots' Party	—				7,523	0.44	0	new	0	new
Party for Democracy and Peace	—				7,289	0.43	0	new	0	new
Other parties	612	0.04	0	0	—				0	0
Independents	31,224	1.86	0	0	—				0	0
Total	1,677,789	100.00	42	–	1,691,876	100.00	5	–	47	–
