= Mesoporous organosilica =

Type of silica containing organic groups

Mesoporous organosilica (periodic mesoporous organosilicas, PMO) are a type of silica containing organic groups that give rise to mesoporosity. They exhibit pore size ranging from 2 nm - 50 nm, depending on the organic substituents. In contrast, zeolites exhibit pore sizes less than a nanometer. PMOs have potential applications as catalysts, adsorbents, trapping agents, drug delivery agents, stationary phases in chromatography and chemical sensors.

== History ==
The breakthrough report in this area described the use of surfactants to produce periodic mesoporous silicas (PMS) in 1992 with pores larger than that of zeolites.

Early mesoporous organosilicas developed had organic groups attached terminally to the silica surface. They were prepared either by grafting of organic group onto the channel walls or by template-directed co-condensation. For example, by modifying the channels of PMSs with alkanethiol groups that could sequester heavy metals. However, there were some major limitations like, inhomogeneity of the pores compared to PMSs, and limited organic content (around 25% with respect to the silicon wall sites).

In 1999, reports described mesoporous organosilicas with organic groups located within the pore channel walls as "bridges" between Si centers. Since these materials had both organic and inorganic groups as integral part of the porous framework, they were considered as composites of organic and inorganic material and designated as periodic mesoporous organosilicas (PMOs). This family of porous materials had high degree of order and uniformity of pores compared to those with terminal organic groups.

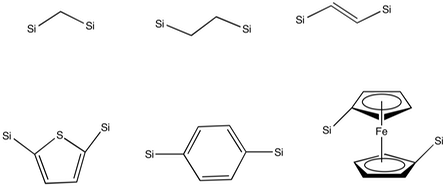
Some organic bridging groups used in early mesoporous organosilica

== Structure of PMOs ==
The framework of PMOs consists of inorganic components (polysilsesquioxanes) uniformly bridged by organic linkers. Most of the bridged polysilsesquioxane can be generically represented by the formula O_{1.5}Si-R-SiO_{1.5}. where R represents the organic bridging group. Each individual organic group is covalently bonded to two or more silicon atoms in the framework. The pores in the material are periodically ordered with diameter in the range 2 -30 nm.

Depending on the synthetic conditions used to make mesoporous organosilicas, the mesoscale structure can either be amorphous or crystalline. Most of the mesoporous organosilicas that have been synthesized are amorphous. Although, x-ray diffraction of these materials indicate periodicity in the structure, sharp peaks in the medium scattering angle representative of crystalline materials are usually absent, except for (00l) reflections. However, few crystalline mesoporous organosilica have been reported,.

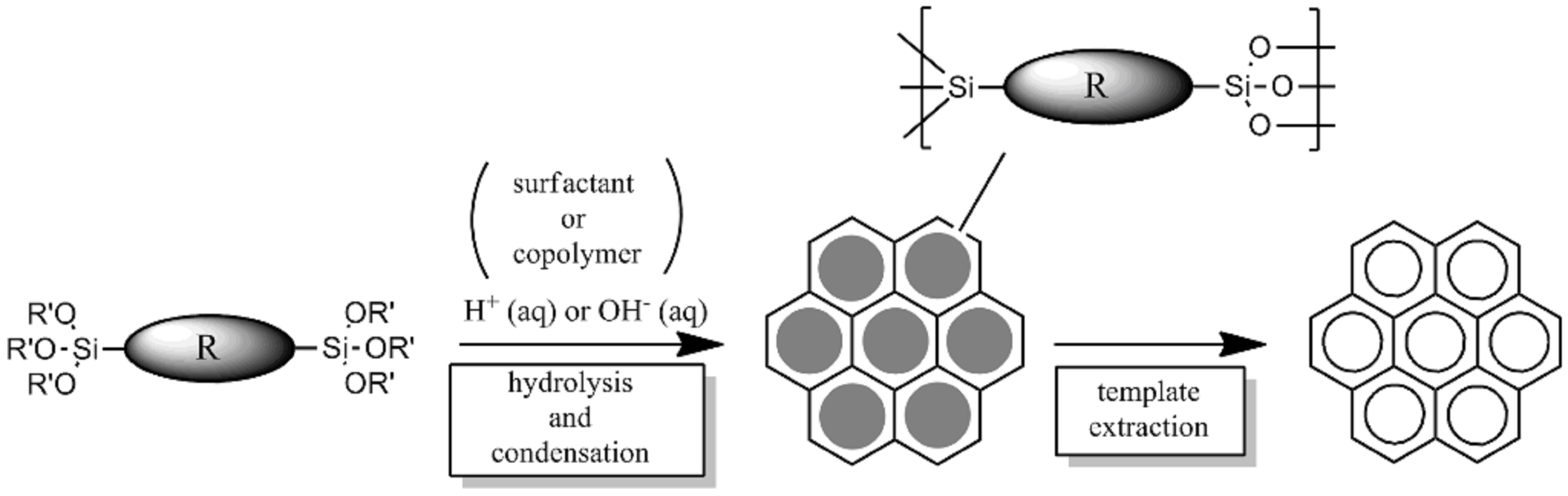
Synthesis routes of periodic mesoporous organosilicas

== Synthesis ==
The primary methods used to make mesoporous organosilicas are evaporation-induced self-assembly, surfactant-mediated synthesis, post-synthetic grafting, and co-condensation. Organosilicas with amorphous structures are typically made by functionalizing organic groups rather than directly integrating the functional groups in the framework, which produces a periodic structure. Furthermore, basic hydrolytic conditions typically produce a periodic structure because of hydrophobic and hydrophilic interactions between hydrolyzed precursors that then self-assemble.

Evaporation-induced self-assembly usually causes random alignment of the material pores. This method of synthesis uses the difference in vapor pressure of solvents to vary the rate of evaporation and therefore the assembly of the organosilica framework.

Surfactant-mediated synthesis has been widely used for the production of mesoporous materials in general, and PMOs specifically,. It involves the addition of a surfactant or copolymer to a specific molecular precursor. The surfactant directs the structure of the material by interacting with the precursor in such a way that is dependent on the properties of the precursor. After the bulk structure is assembled, the surfactant is removed, leaving pores, or channels, embedded in the material framework. The surfactant template can be removed by solvent extraction or ion-exchange mechanisms. An aging process is usually performed at high temperature before removal of the surfactant. During surfactant-mediated synthesis, hydrolysis and polycondensation, or co-condensation, are used to fuse precursor molecules in a framework. Acidic or basic conditions are used for the hydrolysis depending on the precursor being introduced.

The other two synthesis methods used for these materials are post-synthetic grafting and co-condensation. In the case of post-synthetic grafting, organic functional groups, typically organosilanes or alkoxyorganosilanes, are reacted with the assembled silicon mesostructure with or without the surfactant template present. If the template is still present, the grafting process will involve simultaneously removing the template and attaching the functional group. However, the pores of the material can be blocked during this process so a one-pot synthesis using the necessary components is more advantageous. This one-pot synthesis is known as co-condensation, in which the desired organosilyl functional groups are combined with the surfactant or other structure-directing agent. In this method, the material becomes structured and functionalized. Co-condensation gives rise to periodicity with the mesostructure, and it accommodates larger organic groups as well as larger pore sizes because of the one-step assembly process. Most PMOs have been made using the co-condensation method. The most recent method developed builds on co-condensation by combining multiple reactive organic precursors to form a new functional group, which is still combined with the framework molecule and copolymer.

Mesoporous organosilicate materials have been made using bridged organic precursors, in which an organic fragment is positioned between silicon-containing fragments. Single precursor syntheses are typically done with bridged organosilane groups. When only one bridged organic precursor is used, there is a homogeneous distribution of the molecule in the framework. This phenomenon is referred to as molecular-scale periodicity. Chiral precursors can also be introduced into the material framework, and using acidic conditions in the hydrolysis and condensation process proves better for chiral precursors because no racemization occurs. Co-condensation of multiple organosilane precursors can create multi-functional organosilica materials. Tetraethoxysilane (TEOS) is a common silicon precursor used in co-condensation reactions.

== Applications ==
Highly porous compounds are potential catalysts, adsorption, and separation. These have been the roles of zeolites, but their small pore size limits them to work with small molecules. The larger pore size (2-50 nm) of mesoporous materials gives them wider application – larger molecules can be admitted, and guest molecules can migrate faster.

=== Catalysis ===
To effect catalytic transformations using mesoporous organosilicas, it is necessary to functionalize them. The two major methods are to add a group or heteroatom, such as a metal center, to the organic framework, and to anchor an organic or organometallic group to the pore surface.

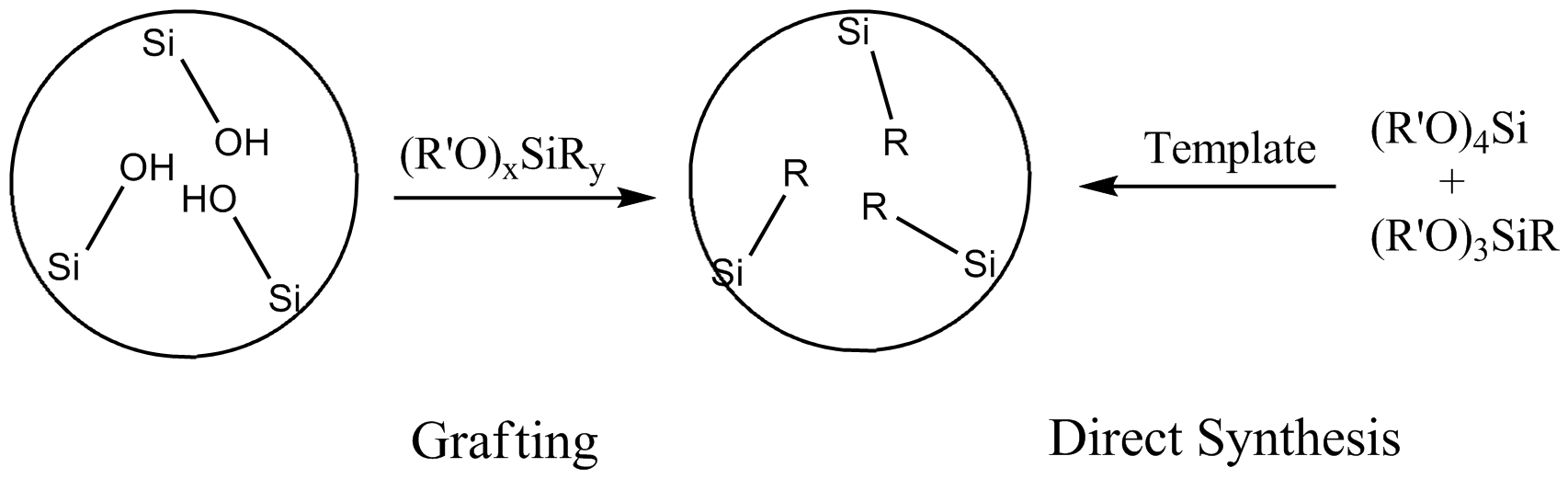
The two methods for anchoring functional groups to organosilica frameworks

Anchoring a homogeneous catalyst onto a mesoporous organosilicas framework has two primary disadvantages: the bulky group in the pore can block travel of guest molecules through it, and preparation of candidate molecules for anchoring to the framework is difficult. However, anchoring can create heterogeneous catalysts for a wide variety of chemical transformations: acid catalysis, base catalysis, coupling and condensation reaction catalysis, and even asymmetric catalysis. Anchored functional groups often have higher catalytic activity than does the bulk material, as one study showed for Nafion, or even than groups incorporated into the organosilica framework, as with sulfonic acid.

=== Other potential uses ===
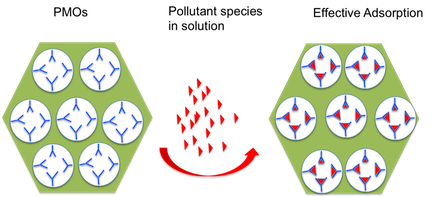
Use of PMOs for adsorption of pollutant species

Mesoporous organosilicas can be functionalized give adsorbants, for removal specific contaminants from air and water. Candidate adsorbants include toxic heavy metals, radioactive material, and various organic pollutants have been synthesized.

Mesoporous organosilicas have been functionalized with fluorescent probes. The advantage of this material as a sensor is its high surface area combined with the high specificity achievable by careful functionalization. Mesoporous organosilicas have been used to sense a wide variety of analytes: metals, industrial pollutants, small organic molecules, and large biological molecules.

Mesoporous organosilicas have been tested as potential materials for separation using HPLC. Froba et al. have shown that by using benzene PMO microspheres as stationary phases better separation can be achieved in the HPLC system. The theory was that the π-π interaction between the aromatic analytes and the phenylene bridge of the PMO framework leads to stronger retention and hence better separation.

Controlled drug release is another aspect in which PMOs have been shown promise. The hydrophobic nature of the PMO walls allow for better control in drug release. In this respect, it is not just the mesoporosity of the PMOs make them advantageous, the tunability of the organic groups also play an important role.

== Future directions ==
It has been proposed that the periodicity of PMOs may produce anisotropic mechanical, electrical and optical responses, in the same manner that periodicity magnifies anisotropy in the unit cell of conventional crystals. Also, studies that have shown that dendrimers, polyhedral oligomeric silsesquioxanes, and carbon nanomaterials like C60 can be incorporated into the pore walls of PMOs offers new directions in the possible applications of these materials. It has been shown that PMOs are more suitable for the construction of organic donor–acceptor systems for photocatalysis than periodic mesoporous silica because organic donor or acceptor groups within the framework provide larger empty spaces for mass transfer in photocatalysis than in mesoporous silicas. Recent investigations on charge transfer systems based on PMOs are suggestive of possible applications of PMOs in areas as such as heterojunction solar cells, photodetectors and light emitting diodes. More exciting applications can emerge by combining these materials with biological molecules such as lipids and proteins.

PMOs with unconventional structures and properties have found high potential for future developments.

== See also ==
- Mesoporous materials
- Zeolites
- Mesoporous silica
- Chirality
- Metal-organic framework
- Asymmetric synthesis
- Ionosilica
