= Changjoon Justin Lee =

American neuroscientist (born 1966)

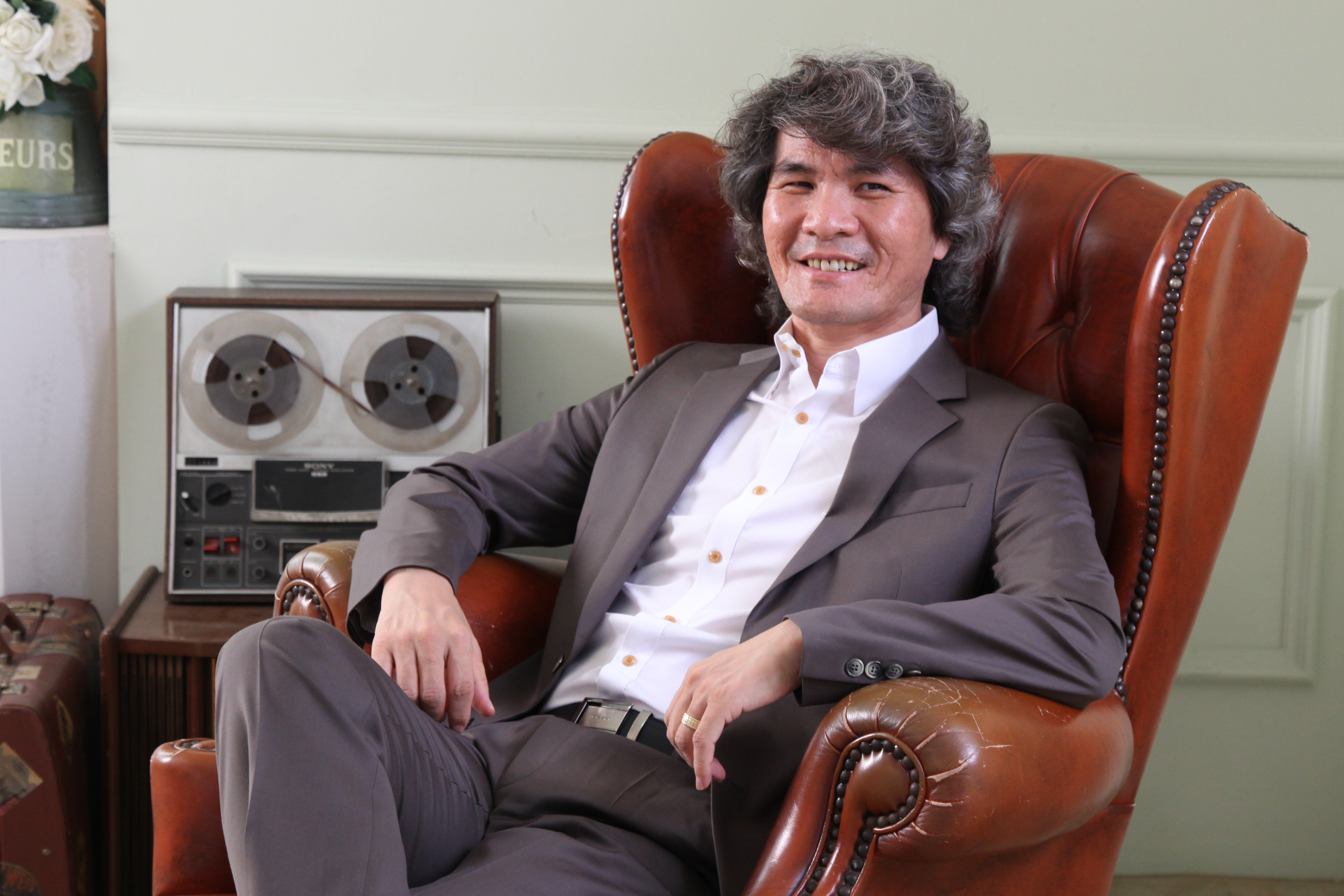
- Born: March 21, 1966; Gimpo, South Korea
- Education: Columbia University, University of Chicago
- Known for: GABA and glia research
- Awards: Science Day 2017 (2017), Kyung-Ahm Prize (2016), FILA Basic Science Award (2014), Scientist of the Year Award (KIST, 2011)
- Scientific career
- Fields: Ion channel, neuron-glia interaction, astrocyte pathophysiology, cognitive glioscience, glioblastoma
- Workplaces: Institute for Basic Science, Korea Institute of Science and Technology, Emory University, Michael Reese Hospital, Columbia University
- Thesis: The Expression and Function of Kainate and AMPA Receptors in Nociceptive Dorsal Root Ganglion Neurons (2001)
- Doctoral advisor: Amy B. MacDermott

Korean name
- Hangul: 이창준
- Hanja: 李昌俊
- RR: I Changjun
- MR: I Ch'angjun
- Website: Center for Cognition and Sociality – Cognitive Glioscience Group

Changjoon Justin Lee (Korean: 이창준; Hanja: 李昌俊) is an American neuroscientist specializing in the field of glioscience. He served as the Director of Center for Neuroscience at the Korea Institute of Science and Technology and later founded the WCI Center for Functional Connectomics as part of the World Class Institute Program. In 2015, he established the Center for Glia-Neuron Interaction before becoming co-director of the IBS Center for Cognition and Sociality and head of the Cognitive Glioscience Group in 2018. He has been on the editorial boards of the journals Molecular Brain and Molecular Pain and is a chief editor of Experimental Neurobiology.

== Early life and education ==
Born in a rural area of Gimpo, Lee interacted with the natural world and raised livestock at home which inspired an interest in biology. After completion of middle school, he left South Korea and moved to the US at age 15 and started high school at Rich Central High School, Olympia Fields, Illinois. While under an Illinois State Scholarship and working as a junior research assistant in the lab of Professor Louis Seiden, Lee majored in chemistry and obtained his B.A. from the University of Chicago in 1990. He then moved to New York where he enrolled in the Graduate School of Arts and Sciences of Columbia University where he earned his M.S. and Ph.D. in neurophysiology under the Department of Physiology and Cellular Biophysics. His doctoral thesis adviser was Professor Amy B. MacDermott, whose lab he worked in as a research technician and later as a graduate research assistant upon recipient of his M.S.

Before the first year of his joint M.S. and Ph.D. study, he worked as a research assistant in Emily Foster's lab at Michael Reese Hospital. Within Columbia University, he was also a research technician in Professor Martin Low's lab.

== Career ==
He then completed a three-year postdoc position in the lab of Professor Traynelis at Emory University in the Department of Pharmacology. His sponsor was Dr. Stephen Traynelis and his research scope was the modulation of NMDA receptors by protease-activated receptors. During the postdoc position, he visited the Korea Institute of Science and Technology (KIST) and was influenced by Shin Hee-sup to join KIST, which he did in 2004 as a senior research scientist. Working at KIST, he became a principle research scientist in 2010 and later a tenured research scientist in 2017.

Lee participated in establishing brain science research infrastructure at KIST, first as a founding member of the Center for Neuroscience with director Shin Hee-sup. The Center is now a constituent of KIST's Brain Science Institute. He also helped to establish the Neuroscience Program of the University of Science and Technology (UST). He also participated as a founding faculty of KU-KIST School of Convergence Technology. As a part of World Class Institute program (WCI), he founded the WCI Center for Functional Connectomics in 2009 and served as the organizing deputy director of the center.

In November 2018, Lee joined the IBS Center for Cognition and Sociality as a co-director with Shin Hee-sup, who he had previously met and worked with at KIST. Shin led the Social Neuroscience Group until his retirement in 2020 while Lee leads the Cognitive Glioscience Group which focuses on four research areas: molecular glioscience, glia-neuron interaction, glial plasticity and cognition, and gliopathy.

=== GABA synthesis and release from glia ===
Lee's research group has contributed to the field of gliotransmission by creating several seminal publications on the channel-mediated gamma-Aminobutyric acid (GABA) and glutamate release from astrocytes. They later identified the biosynthetic pathway for astrocyte GABA and found monoamine oxidase B to be the key enzyme for GABA production which raised the possibility that astrocytes can directly participate in cognitive processes via astrocytic GABA.

His team also found a connection with GABA from reactive astrocytes and impaired memory in mouse models of Alzheimer's disease, leading them to propose astrocytic GABA might be a diagnostic tool, biomarker, and therapeutic target for both neurological diseases Alzheimer's and Parkinson's. The research is notable as it revealed that astrocytes, like neurons, play a significant role in cognitive processes. The findings also resulted in a technology transfer to MegaBioWood which will be prepared for a phase I clinical trial in 2019. In response to his Alzheimer's research related to causes of memory loss, Lee received the Science Day 2017 Presidential Medal of Honor.

=== Molecular mechanism of glutamate and d-serine release from glia ===
It is known that glutamate is released from astrocytes but the exact method of their release, i.e., the release mechanism, has been controversial. His team went on to discover two models of glutamate release; a fast mode through TREK-1 in the K2P channel and a slow mode through the Best1 channel in hippocampal astrocytes. They found that Best1-controlled glutamate release is related to receptor mediated synaptic plasticity in the hippocampus when PAR1 is activated. These papers also show that the key modulator for excitation-inhibition balance in the brain is mainly dependent on the levels of glutamate and GABA. In addition to glutamate, Best1 can also release d-serine, which can act as a co-agonist of NMDA receptors to participate in synaptic plasticity.

=== Astrocytic volume transient and brain plasticity ===
Some of his glioscience-related research has been with identifying and characterizing several astrocytic ion channels. His teams learned that the astrocytic two-pore potassium channel K2P has a passive conductance with a subunit composition of a heterodimer of TWIK-1 and TREK-1. They also put forth the proposal that the heterodimer of TWIK-1 and TREK-1 could be a potential therapeutic target for epilepsy, depression, and anxiety disorders caused by concentrations of potassium ion. The team found that the astrocytic volume-regulated anion channel (VRAC) is tweety-homolog (Ttyh), which is notable as VRAC was proposed to be leucine-rich repeat-containing protein 8 (LRRC8). Lee's research also showed that the astrocytic volume change through aquaporin-4 water channel is critical for synaptic plasticity. They demonstrated that a change in the volume can directly affect spatial memory in mice, meanwhile it affects memory and language-association learning in humans.

=== Reactive gliosis and neurodegeneration ===
Reactive gliosis has often referred to as the basis for neuroinflammation, which has implicated them in Alzheimer's disease and other neurodegenerative diseases but their in vivo functions have not been fully tested due to the lack of an appropriate experimental model. When Lee's team developed an astrocyte-specific toxin receptor model, they found that the astrocytes selectively became reactive, which identifies severe reactive astrocytes as a key factor in Alzheimer's disease neurodegeneration.

=== Software development ===
Lee has been involved in the development of several research-related software projects, including Mini Analysis and Easy Articles, both distributed by Synaptosoft. His nervous system research software was the reason Lee was scouted by Shin Hee-sup to conduct research in Korea.

== Honors and awards ==
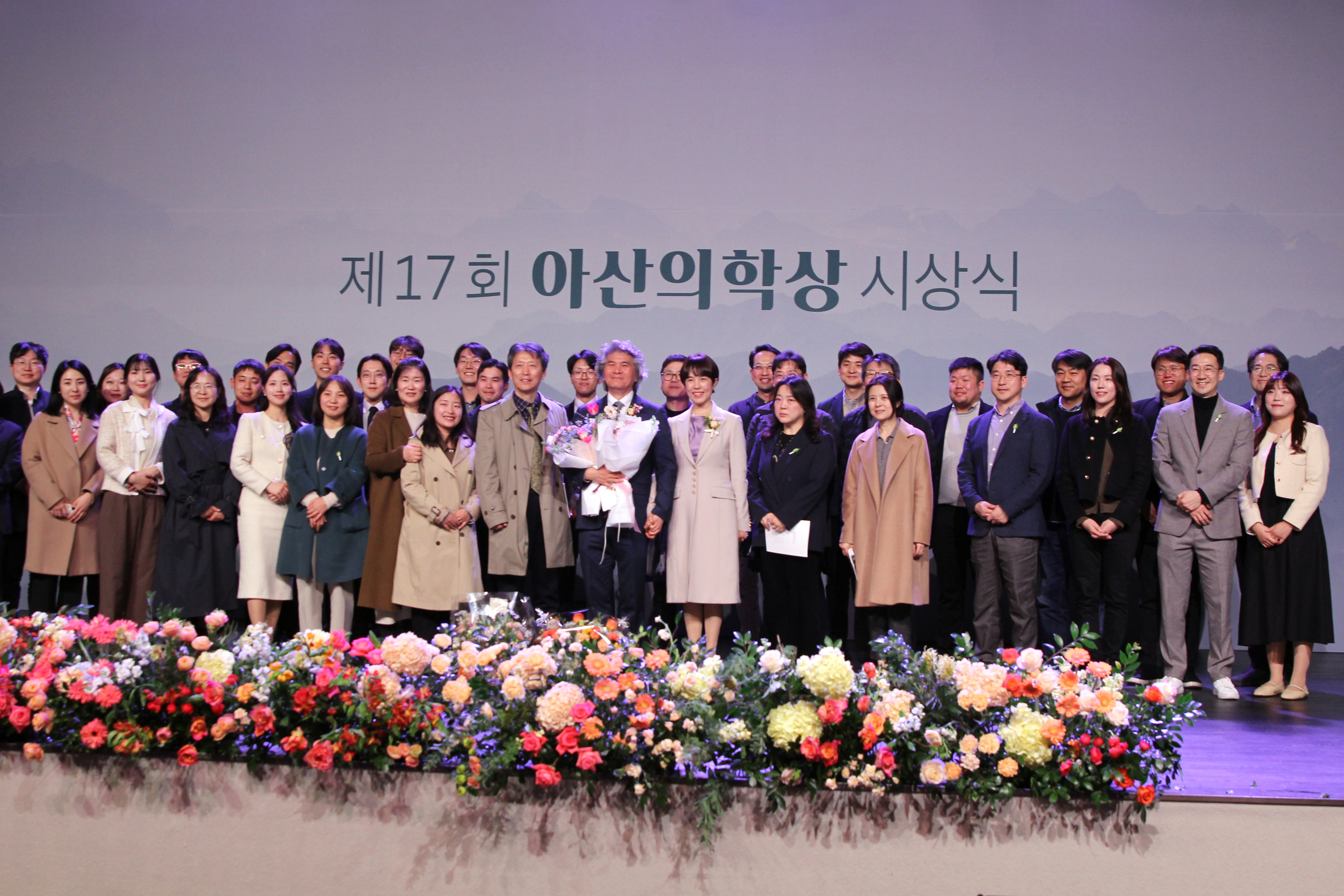
Changjoon Justin Lee at the 2024 Asan Award in Medicine ceremony with researchers and family.

- 2025: Asian Scientist 100, Asian Scientist
- 2025: Order of Science and Technology Merit 3rd level, Korean government
- 2024: Asan Award in Medicine
- 2023: Korea Science Award
- 2020: Korea's Top 5 Bio-Field Research Results and News, POSTECH Biological Research Information Center
- 2017: Science Day 2017, Korea Science & Technology Development Presidential Medal of Honor
- 2016: Kyung-Ahm Prize, Kyung-Ahm Education & Cultural Foundation
- 2014: FILA Basic Science Award, Korean Academy of Science and Technology
- 2014: Jang Jin Award, Korean Society for Brain and Neuroscience
- 2013: Dec. Star Professor Award, University of Science & Technology
- 2013: Aug. Outstanding Mentor Award, University of Science & Technology
- 2012: Dec. Best Mentor Award, University of Science & Technology
- 2011: Jun. Best Mentor Award, University of Science & Technology
- 2011: Jun. Outstanding Mentor Award, University of Science & Technology
- 2011: Scientist of the Year Award, KIST
- 2011: 100 Leaders in Korea, The Dong-A Ilbo
- 2011: Outstanding Research Team Award, KIST
- 2011: Scientist of the Month, Korean Ministry of Science & Technology
- 2010: Outstanding Researcher Award, Prime Minister of Korea
- 2010: Dec. Scientist of the Month Award, KIST
- 2009: Outstanding Project Award, KIST
- 2009: Jun. Outstanding Teacher Award, University of Science & Technology
- 2009: May Outstanding Mentor Award, University of Science & Technology
- 2009: Feb. Outstanding Researcher Award, KIST
- 2003: Outstanding Researcher Award, Association of Korean Neuroscientists
- 2000: Outstanding Researcher Award, Association of Korean Neuroscientists

== Scientific society ==
- 2023: Member of Korean Academy of Science and Technology
- 2016: President of Korean Neuroglia Society
- 2016: General Secretary of Korean Society for Brain and Neural Sciences
- 2015: Secretariat of Korean Society for Brain and Neural Sciences
- 1996: Member of Society for Neuroscience
- 1985: National Honors Society

== Journal editing ==
- 2017–Present: Editor-in-chief, Experimental Neurobiology
- 2008–2017: Editorial Board & Managing Editor, Molecular Brain
- 2004–Present: Editorial board, Molecular Pain

== See also ==
- Alexei Verkhratsky
- Maiken Nedergaard
- Baljit S. Khakh
- Rudolf Virchow
- Ben Barres
- Boston University CTE Center and Brain Bank
- Korea Brain Research Institute
