= Hee-Sup Shin =

South Korean neuroscientist (born 1950)

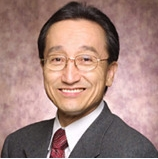
- Born: July 29, 1950; Uiwang, Gyeonggi Province
- Education: Seoul National University, Cornell University
- Known for: T-type calcium channels
- Awards: AFH Lectureship Prize (2004); Ho-Am Prize in Science (2004); DuPont Prize (2004); National Scientist of the Republic of Korea (2006)
- Scientific career
- Fields: Neuroscience
- Workplaces: Korea Advanced Institute of Science and Technology, Institute for Basic Science, Korea Institute of Science and Technology, Pohang University of Science and Technology, Whitehead Institute for Biomedical Research

Korean name
- Hangul: 신희섭
- RR: Sin Huiseop
- MR: Sin Hŭisŏp

Hee-sup Shin (born 1950) is a South Korean neuroscientist whose work focuses on brain research of genetically engineered mice via gene knockout in order to better understand the human brain. His research resulted in him being named a National Scientist by the Korean Ministry of Science and Technology. He is a former co-director of the Center for Cognition and Sociality leading the Social Neuroscience Group in the Institute for Basic Science (IBS) located at Korea Advanced Institute of Science and Technology (KAIST).

== Education ==
Shin received his M.D. in immunology from the College of Medicine of Seoul National University in 1974. In 1983, he obtained a Ph.D. in genetics and cell biology from Cornell University. During his Ph.D. studies, he worked for several years as a postdoc in immunology at the Sloan-Kettering Institute for Cancer Research.

== Career ==
Upon graduating from Cornell, Shin worked as a research associate in genetics at the Sloan-Kettering Institute for Cancer Research until 1985. He then moved to Massachusetts where he held a dual position as an associate professor in the Department of Biology at MIT and as an associate member of the Whitehead Institute for Biomedical Research. In 1991, he returned to Korea to work as an associate professor and later professor in the Department of Life Science in POSTECH where he stayed for a decade. During this time, he also was director of the Biotechnology Research Center in POSTECH and director of the National CRI Center for Calcium and Learning. He was the first researcher within Korea to apply genetics to brain science research and received overseas attention in 1997 upon his discovery of the genes PLC-β1 and PLC-β4, which are related to epilepsy and paralysis.

Leaving POSTECH in 2001, he went to the Korea Institute of Science and Technology (KIST) to be a principal research scientist, a position he held for a decade. In 2005, he became the director of KIST's Center for Neural Science and then director-general of their Brain Science Institute. In 2012, he moved to Daejeon to become founding director of the IBS Center for Cognition and Sociality located at KAIST. The center expanded when Changjoon Justin Lee became a co-director of the center in 2018. Lee leads the Cognitive Glioscience Group while Shin led the Social Neuroscience Group until his retirement in 2020. After his retirement as co-director, he continued research at the center as Research Fellow Emeritus.

== Research ==
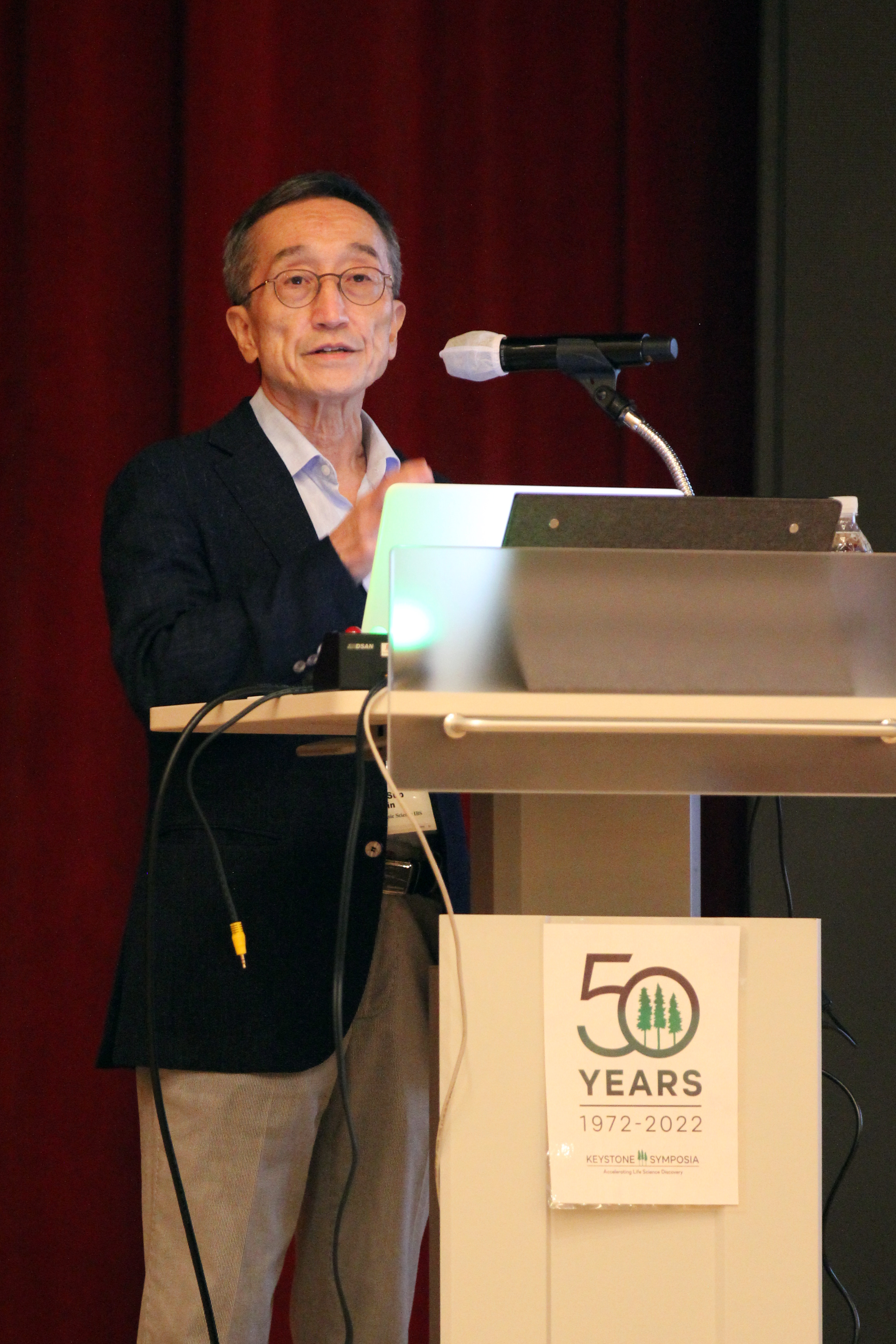
Hee-Sup Shin giving a speech at the Keystone Symposia Neurocircuitry of Social Behavior.

Shin's work is aimed at understanding how changes in calcium dynamics in nerve cells regulate brain functions. He has been defining the physiological roles that a group of genes play in vivo, whose functions are known to be critical for regulation of intracellular calcium dynamics.

Shin first generates a transgenic mouse for a given gene, and then analyzes the mouse at the molecular, cellular, physiological, and behavioral levels. Shin has been particularly interested in defining the functions of voltage gated calcium channels in normal as well as pathological states of the brain.

In particular, his work on the mutant mouse for a1G T-type calcium channels has provided conclusive evidence that T-type channels in the thalamus of the brain function to block sensory information derived from the body to be delivered to the cerebral cortex. The thalamus is the gateway through which all the somatic sensory information from the periphery must pass through to reach the cerebral cortex, where perception is achieved. Thus, the T-type channel mutant mouse lacking this block showed an enhanced response to visceral pain.

Shin has also shown that the same mutant mouse was resistant to absence epilepsy, a disease characterized by a brief loss of consciousness accompanied by abnormal EEG findings. Together, these results indicate that the thalamus is the brain center, controlling the state of consciousness by gating the sensory information from the outside world to reach the cortex, and that T-type calcium channels are the key element in this gating function.

== Honors and awards ==
- 1983: Frank Lappin Horsfall Jr. Award, Cornell University Graduate School of Medical Science
- 1994: Korean Academy of Science and Technology, Member
- 1997: Kumho Science Award, Kumho Foundation
- 1997: Hantan Life Science Award, Hantan Foundation
- 1998: Award for Excellent Research Paper in Science & Technology, Ministry of Science and Technology
- 2000: Hamchun Medical Science Award, Hamchun Foundation
- 2003: Person of the Month, Korea Institute of Science and Technology (KIST)
- 2004: Scientist of the Month, Ministry of Science and Technology
- 2004: Dupont Prize, Dupont Foundation
- 2004: Grand Prize, Korea Institute of Science and Technology
- 2004: Ho-Am Prize, Hoam Foundation
- 2004: Order of Civil Merit, President of South Korea
- 2004: AHF Lectureship Award, Calgary University, Canada
- 2005: Top Scientist and Technologist Award of Korea
- 2005: President, International Behavioural and Neural Genetics Society
- 2006: National Scientist of the Republic of Korea, Ministry of Education, Science and Technology
- 2008: Distinguished Alumni Award, Cornell University
- 2009: National Academy of Sciences of the United States, Foreign Associate
- 2010: National Academy of Sciences (NAS), South Korea, Member
- 2013: Star Professor Award, University of Science & Technology
- 2015: Hotchkiss Brain Institute Lectureship Award, University of Calgary
- 2018: Fellow of American Association for the Advancement of Science
- 2020: Francine Shapiro Award, EMDR-Europe Society
- 2021: Fellow, IUPS Academy of Physiologists, International Union of Physiological Sciences
