= Kaang Bong-Kiun =

Southu Korean neuroscietnist (born 1961)

Bong-Kiun Kaang
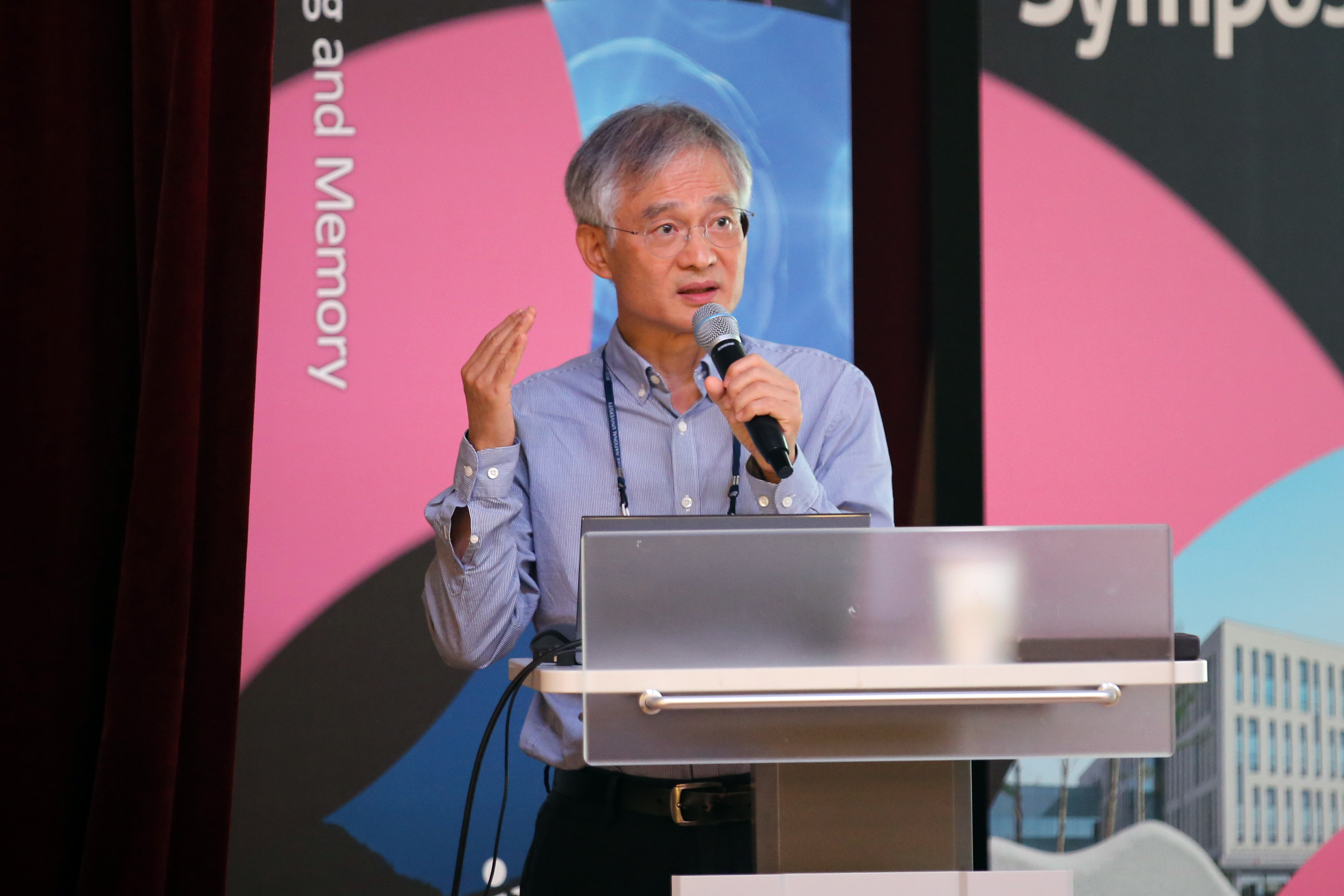
- Born: 1961 (age 64–65); Jeju Province, South Korea
- Education: B.S. Seoul National University (1984) M.S. Seoul National University (1986) Ph.D. Columbia University (1992) Postdoctoral Research Fellow, Center for Neurobiology and Behavior, Columbia University (1992 – 1994)
- Known for: Aplysia, neuroscience, learning and memory
- Awards: Best Research Award, College of Natural Sciences, Seoul National University (2007); Excellent Research Scientist, Korea Ministry of Science and Technology (2007); Life Science Award, Korean Society for Molecular and Cellular Biology (2008); Fellow of the Korean Academy of Science and Technology (2010)
- Scientific career
- Fields: Neuroscience
- Workplaces: Seoul National University, Dept. of Biological Sciences & Brain and Cognitive Sciences
- Doctoral advisor: Eric R. Kandel, M.D.(Nobel Laureate, 2000)

- Kaang Bong-Kiun
- Hangul: 강봉균
- Hanja: 姜奉均
- RR: Gang Bonggyun
- MR: Kang Ponggyun

Kaang Bong-Kiun (born November 21, 1961) is a South Korean professor of neuroscience in the Department of Biological Sciences of Seoul National University. He is a fellow of the Korean Academy of Science and Technology and co-director of the IBS Center for Cognition and Sociality with Changjoon Justin Lee. He is also serving as the 2025 President of the Korean Society for Biochemistry and Molecular Biology.

== Early life and education ==
Kaang was born in Jeju Province, South Korea, on November 21, 1961. He received his bachelor's degree in 1984 and his M.S. in 1986 from the Department of Microbiology, Seoul National University. During his M.S. course, he developed an interest in molecular neuroscience, particularly, in how memory is stored in the brain at the molecular level. He then went to Columbia University where he was supervised by a Nobel laureate Eric R. Kandel for his Ph.D. course and a brief postdoctoral study. He investigated the molecular mechanisms of learning and memory using a simple animal, the marine snail Aplysia. Under the supervision of Dr. Kandel, he received his Ph.D. in 1992. Kaang's Ph.D. thesis, which was entitled, "Studies of Long-Term Facilitation Using Gene Transfer Methods," introduced the development of the gene delivery system in Aplysia neurons. He continued his research as a postdoctoral research fellow at the Center for Neurobiology and Behavior at Columbia University until 1994, when he was appointed to a faculty position at Seoul National University, Korea.

== Work ==
Kaang's studies have mainly focused on the molecular mechanisms of learning and memory. In his Ph.D. course, he developed the microinjection-based gene transfer method for Aplysia neurons. This technology opened up a new era of molecular studies on the memory mechanisms in Aplysia, as well as of functional studies of receptors, signaling molecules, and ion channels, which play key roles in neuronal functions. He revealed that serotonin-induced transcription requires the protein kinase-A-mediated phosphorylation of the cAMP-response element-binding protein (CREB). Moreover, he found that multiple pulses of serotonin stimulate gene expression that is mediated by the cAMP-response element (CRE).

He continued to study Aplysia when he set up his own laboratory in Korea. He started by establishing an expressed sequence tag database and transcriptome analyses of Aplysia. He identified a serotonin receptor involved in learning-related synaptic facilitation in Aplysia. In addition, he was successful in finding the novel signaling molecules ApLLP, CAMAP, ApPDE4, and ApAUF1, which are involved in long-term facilitation. With his colleagues at Columbia University, he delineated the molecular networks of the molecules that interplay with other regulatory molecules, such as ApCAM, CREB1, CREB2, C/EBP, and ApAF. Furthermore, Kaang reported that, by genetically controlling the expression of these key molecules in specific neurons, he could induce long-term facilitation that lasted days with a single pulse of serotonin that normally induces short-term facilitation that lasts only several minutes.

In parallel with these studies in Aplysia, Kaang has expanded his research field to more complex mammalian models. Combining molecular, electrophysiological, and behavioral experimental tools, he began to explore the mechanisms of learning and memory in mice. One of the major findings from his group was proving the importance of synaptic protein degradation in memory reorganization. He found that postsynaptic proteins were degraded in the hippocampus by polyubiquitination after the retrieval of contextual fear memory. Moreover, the infusion of proteasome inhibitors into the CA1 of the hippocampus immediately after retrieval prevented anisomycin-induced memory impairment and the extinction of fear memory. Another major finding from his laboratory was the importance of a kinase, PI3Kγ, in long-term depression and behavioral flexibility.

His interests also include neurological symptoms such as pain and itch and psychiatric disorders, such as autism. One of his major investigations regarding pain was proving that PKMζ, a molecule known for its role in the maintenance of long-term potentiation and long-term memory, is important in maintaining chronic pain in the anterior cingulate cortex. In collaboration with Min Zhuo from the University of Toronto, he showed that the phosphorylation of PKMζ was increased in a neuropathic pain model in the anterior cingulate cortex. In addition, they showed that chronic pain behavior was alleviated by treating mice with the PKMζ blocker ZIP, suggesting that this could be a new therapeutic target for treating chronic pain.

In collaboration with M.G. Lee and E. Kim, he demonstrated that NMDAR-dependent synaptic plasticity in the hippocampus is impaired in a mouse model of autism, the Shank2 knockout. When they treated the mice with drugs that upregulate NMDA receptor function, the impairment was recovered, suggesting the possibility that these drugs could be used for treating patients with autism in the future.

Kaang has published 110 research and review articles in a number of journals, including Nature, Science, Cell, Neuron, and Nature Neuroscience. He has been the editor-in-chief of Molecular Brain. Kaang received the Life Science Award from the Korean Society for Molecular and Cellular Biology in 2008. He was awarded the Donghun Award from the Korean Society for Biochemistry and Molecular Biology in 2012. He also won the Kyung-Ahm Prize in the same year from the Kyung Ahm Foundation. In 2025, he sat on the 2025 Kyung-Ahm Prize Committee.

== Awards ==
- The Best Research Award, College of Natural Sciences, Seoul National University (2007)
- Excellent Research Scientist, Korea Ministry of Science and Technology (2007)
- Life Science Award, Korean Society for Molecular and Cellular Biology (2008)
- Fellow of the Korean Academy of Science and Technology (2010)
- Donghun Award, Korean Society for Biochemistry and Molecular Biology
- National Scientist of the Republic of Korea, Ministry of Education, Science and Technology, Korea (2012)
- Kyung-Ahm Prize (2012)
- National Academy of Sciences Award (2016)
- Top Scientist and Technologist Award of Korea, Korean Federation of Science and Technology Societies (2018)
- Ho-Am Prize in Science, Chemistry and Life Sciences (2021)
- Member, National Academy of Sciences of the Republic of Korea (2025)

== Publications ==
- Jeong, Jaeseung; Kaang, Bong-kiun; Lee, Jung-Mo; 이, 현숙; Choi, Kiwoon (20 July 2012). 인간과 우주에 대해 아주 조금밖에 모르는 것들 [What don't we know? Science 125 Questions] (in Korean). 낮은산. p. 288. ISBN 9788989646822.
