= Hong Gil Nam =

South Korean scientist (born 1957)

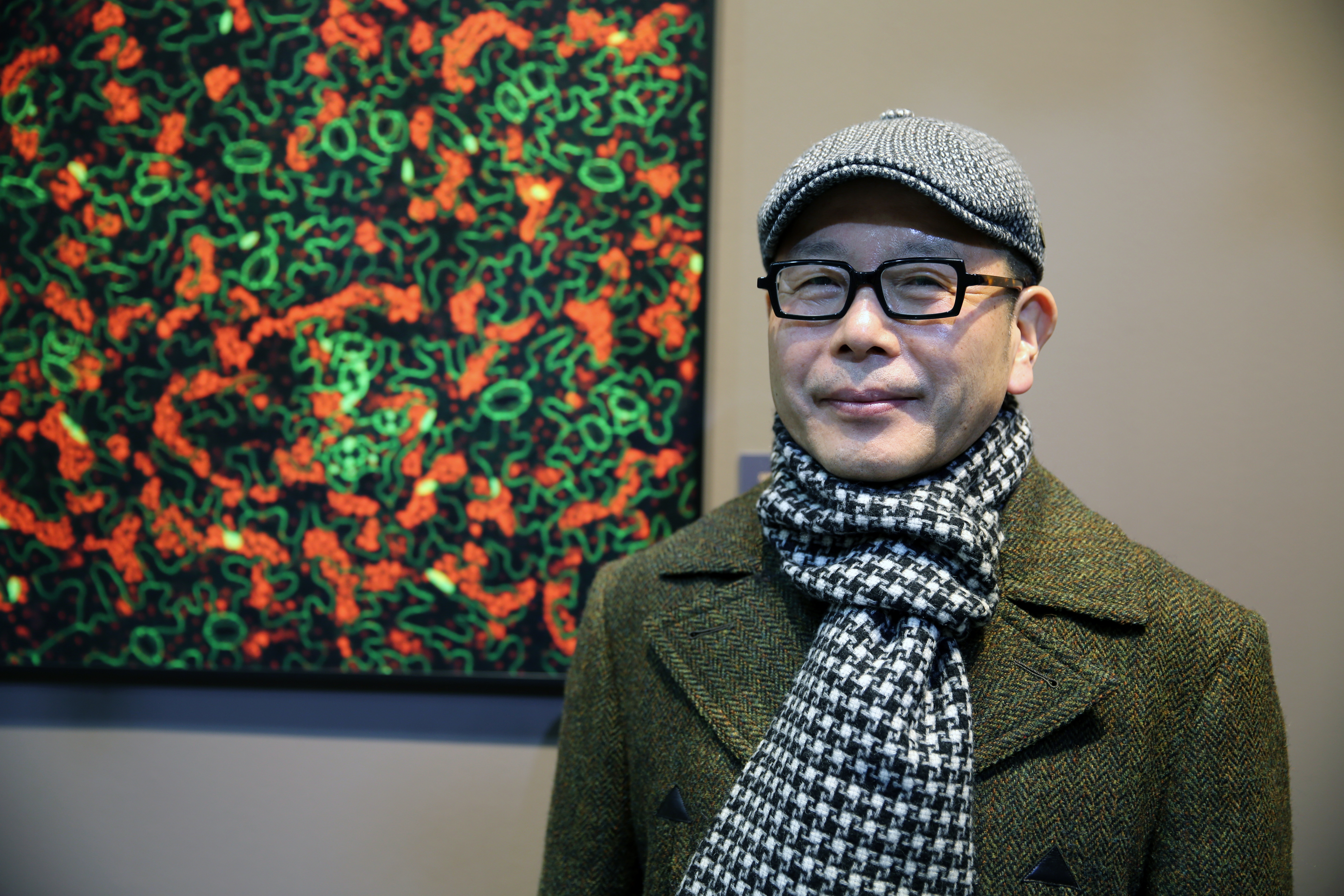
- Born: 1957 (age 68–69)
- Education: Seoul National University, University of North Carolina
- Awards: Ho-am Prize in Science (2014), National Scientist of the Republic of Korea (2010), National Academy of Science Award in Basic Science (2009), POSCO TJ Park Prize (2009), Korea Science Award (2005)
- Scientific career
- Fields: Biology, plant senescence, ageing
- Workplaces: POSTECH, Biological Research Information Center, Korean Society of Bioinformatics, National Core Research Center for Systems Bio-Dynamics, Daegu Gyeongbuk Institute of Science and Technology, Institute for Basic Science

Korean name
- Hangul: 남홍길
- Hanja: 南洪吉
- RR: Nam Honggil
- MR: Nam Honggil
- Website: Center for Plant Aging Research

Hong Gil Nam (Korean: 남홍길; born 1957) is a South Korean biologist teaching in the Department of New Biology of Daegu Gyeongbuk Institute of Science and Technology and leading research as director of the Center for Plant Aging Research. His research interests include comparative aging in diverse kingdoms, including plant and animals, to reveal aging mechanisms among species, cross-kingdom interaction between plants and animals, and biochemistry at nano and micro levels. He is the founder and former director of the Biological Research Information Center, a member of the Korean Academy of Science and Technology, and has served on the editorial board in Molecular Plant since 2013.

== Education ==
Nam did his undergraduate studies in chemistry at Seoul National University and received his Ph.D. degree in the same field from the University of North Carolina, Chapel Hill, United States, in 1985.

== Career ==
From 1986 to 1988, he worked as a research fellow in the Department of Genetics of Harvard Medical School with Howard M. Goodman. He then returned to Korea to start work as an assistant professor in the Department of Chemistry, POSTECH. He later became an assistant professor, full professor, and chair of POSTECH's Department of Life Sciences before being the head of the School of Interdisciplinary Biosciences and Bioengineering (I-BIO) and Hong Deok Distinguished Professor. Outside of his work at POSTECH, he founded and directed the Biological Research Information Center (BRIC) from 1996 to 2005.

He left his positions in POSTECH in 2012 to be a full professor in the Department of New Biology, Daegu Gyeongbuk Institute of Science and Technology (DGIST) and founding director of the Center for Plant Aging Research, Institute for Basic Science (IBS).

== Awards ==
- 2014: Ho-Am Prize in Science, Ho-Am Foundation, South Korea
- 2010: National Scientist of the Republic of Korea, Ministry of Education, Science and Technology and National Research Foundation of Korea
- 2009: National Academy of Sciences Award, South Korea
- 2009: 54th National Academy of Science Award in the field of Basic Science, National Academy of Sciences, South Korea
- 2009: POSCO TJ Park Prize, POSCO TJ Park Foundation, South Korea
- 2005: Korea Science Award, South Korea
- 2000: Scientist of the Month, Ministry of Science and ICT and National Research Foundation of Korea
