= Biological patents in the United States =

Type of patents in the United States

As with all utility patents in the United States, a biological patent provides the patent holder with the right to exclude others from making, using, selling, or importing the claimed invention or discovery in biology for a limited period of time - for patents filed after 1998, 20 years from the filing date.

Until recently, natural biological substances themselves could be patented (apart from any associated process or usage) in the United States if they were sufficiently "isolated" from their naturally occurring states. Prominent historical examples of such patents on isolated products of nature include adrenaline, insulin, vitamin B_{12}, and gene patents. However, the US Supreme Court ruled in 2013 that mere isolation by itself is not sufficient for something to be deemed inventive subject matter.

== History ==
The United States has been patenting chemical compositions based upon human products for over 100 years. The first patent for a human product was granted on March 20, 1906, for a purified form of adrenaline. It was challenged and upheld in Parke-Davis v. Mulford. Judge Hand argued that natural substances when they are purified are more useful than the original natural substances.

The 1970s marked the first time when scientists patented methods on their biotechnological inventions with recombinant DNA. It was not until 1980 that patents for whole-scale living organisms were permitted. In 1980, the U.S. Supreme Court, in Diamond v. Chakrabarty, upheld the first patent on a newly created living organism, a bacterium for digesting crude oil in oil spills. The patent examiner for the United States Patent and Trademark Office had rejected the patent of a living organism, but Chakrabarty appealed. As a rule, raw natural material is generally rejected for patent approval by the USPTO. The Court ruled that as long as the organism is truly "man-made", such as through genetic engineering, then it is patentable. Because the DNA of Chakrabarty's organism was modified, it was patentable.

Since that 1980 court case, there have been many patents of genetically modified organisms. This includes bacteria (as just mentioned), viruses, seeds, plants, cells, and even non-human animals. Isolated and manipulated cells - even human cells - can also be patented. In 1998, the U.S. Patent and Trademark Office (PTO) issued a broad patent claiming primate (including human) embryonic stem cells, entitled "Primate Embryonic Stem Cells" (US 5843780). On 13 March 2001, a second patent (US 6200806) was issued with the same title but focused on human embryonic stem cells. In another example, a genetically modified mouse, dubbed the Oncomouse, that is useful for studying cancer, was patented by Harvard University as US 4736866.

Companies and organizations, like the University of California, have patented entire genomes.

== Food patents ==
An early example of a food patent is the patent granted to RiceTec for basmati rice in 1997. In 1999, a patent was filed for a peanut butter and jelly sandwich that was without crust. Agriculture giant Monsanto filed for a patent on certain pig genes in 2004.

== Gene patents ==
A gene patent is a patent on a specific isolated gene sequence, its chemical composition, the processes for obtaining or using it, or a combination of such claims. With respect to subject matter, gene patents may be considered a subset of the broader category of biological patents.

Gene patents may claim the isolated natural sequences of genes, the use of a natural sequence for purposes such as diagnostic testing, or a natural sequence that has been altered by adding a promoter or other changes to make it more useful. In the United States, patents on genes have only been granted on isolated gene sequences with known functions, and these patents cannot be applied to the naturally occurring genes in humans or any other naturally occurring organism.

=== Examples ===
The "Chakrabarty patent", owned by General Electric, was filed in 1972 and issued in 1981 after the Supreme Court decision discussed above. While not commercially important, this patent and the Supreme Court case "opened the floodgates for protection of biotechnology-related inventions and helped spark the growth of an industry".

In 1978 University of California filed a patent application for the cDNA encoding human growth hormone, which issued in 1982 as U.S. Patent No. 4,363,877 and listed Howard M. Goodman, John Shine, and Peter H. Seeburg as inventors. University of California licensed its patent to Lilly, leading to extended litigation among University of California, Lilly, and Genentech; each of Lilly and Genentech had introduced recombinant human growth hormone drugs, which were among the first biotech drugs brought to market.

The "Cohen/Boyer patents" were invented by Stanley Cohen of Stanford University and Herbert Boyer of University of California, San Francisco. The patents cover inventions for splicing genes to make recombinant proteins that are foundational to the biotechnology industry. Stanford managed the patents and licensed them nonexclusively and broadly, earning over $200 million for the universities.

The "Axel Patents" were invented by Richard Axel, Michael H. Wigler, and Saul J. Silverstein of Columbia University. These patents covered cotransformation, a form of transformation, another foundational method of biotechnology; Columbia licensed these patents nonexclusively and broadly and earned about $790 million.

Key methods to manipulate DNA to create monoclonal antibodies are covered by a thicket of patents, including the "Winter patent" was invented by Gregory P. Winter of the Medical Research Council which covers methods to make chimeric, humanized antibodies and has been licensed to about fifty companies. Abgenix owned a patent on methods of making transgenic mice lacking endogenous heavy chains. The "Boss patent" was owned by Celltech and covered methods of making recombinant antibodies and antibody fragments, together with vectors and host cells useful in these processes. Genentech owned the "Old Cabilly" patent that covered altered and native immunoglobulins prepared in recombinant cell culture, as well as the "New Cabilly" patent that covers artificial synthesis of antibody molecules. Medarex owned a patent that covered high affinity human antibodies from transgenic mice. These patents have been broadly licensed and have been the subject of litigation among patent holders and companies that have brought monoclonal antibody drugs to market.

A patent application for the isolated BRCA1 gene and cancer-promoting mutations, as well as methods to diagnose the likelihood of getting breast cancer, was filed by the University of Utah, National Institute of Environmental Health Sciences (NIEHS) and Myriad Genetics in 1994; over the next year, Myriad, in collaboration with investigators from Endo Recherche, Inc., HSC Research & Development Limited Partnership, and University of Pennsylvania, isolated and sequenced the BRCA2 gene, and the first BRCA2 patent was filed in the U.S. by Myriad and other institutions in 1995. Myriad is the exclusive licensee of these patents and has enforced them in the US against clinical diagnostic labs. This means that legally all testing must be done through Myriad's lab or by a lab which it had licensed. This business model led from Myriad being a startup in 1994 to being a publicly traded company with 1200 employees and about $500M in annual revenue in 2012; it also led to controversy and the Association for Molecular Pathology v. Myriad Genetics lawsuit mentioned below. The patents expire, starting in 2014.

=== Myriad Genetics case ===
Association for Molecular Pathology v. Myriad Genetics was a 2013 case challenging the validity of gene patents in the United States, specifically challenging certain claims in issued patents owned or controlled by Myriad Genetics that covered isolated DNA sequences, methods to diagnose propensity to cancer by looking for mutated DNA sequences, and methods to identify drugs using isolated DNA sequences.

The case was originally heard in the United States District Court for the Southern District of New York, which ruled that all the challenged claims were not patentable subject matter. Myriad then appealed to the United States Court of Appeals for the Federal Circuit. The Circuit court overturned the previous decision in part, ruling that isolated DNA which does not exist alone in nature can be patented and that the drug screening claims were valid, and confirmed in part, finding the diagnostic claims unpatentable. The plaintiffs appealed to the Supreme Court, which granted cert and remanded the case back to the Federal Circuit. The Federal Circuit did not change its opinion, so on September 25, 2012, the American Civil Liberties Union and the Public Patent Foundation filed a petition for certiorari with the Supreme Court with respect to the second Federal Circuit Decision.

On November 30, 2012, the Supreme Court agreed to hear the plaintiffs' appeal of the Federal Circuit's ruling. In June 2013, in Association for Molecular Pathology v. Myriad Genetics (No. 12-398), the court unanimously ruled that, "A naturally occurring DNA segment is a product of nature and not patent eligible merely because it has been isolated," invalidating Myriad's patents on the BRCA1 and BRCA2 genes. However, the Court also held synthesized DNA sequences, not occurring in nature, can still be eligible for patent protection.

== Controversy ==
Controversy over biological patents occurs on many levels, driven by, for example, concern over the expense of patented medicines or diagnostics tests (against Myriad Genetics with respect to their breast cancer diagnostic test), concerns over genetically modified food which comes from patented genetically modified seeds as well as farmer's rights to harvest and plant seeds from the crops, for example legal actions by Monsanto using its patents.

The patenting of organisms or extracts from indigenous plants or animals that are already known to local populations has been called biopiracy. Critics say that such patents deny local populations the right to use those inventions, for instance, to grow food.

In the United States, biological material derived from humans can be patented if it has been sufficiently transformed. In litigation that was famous at the time, a cancer patient, John Moore, sued the University of California. Cancer cells had been removed from Moore as part of his medical treatment; these cells were studied and manipulated by researchers. The resulting cells were "immortalized" and were patented by the university as U.S. patent 4,438,032 and have become widely used research tools. The subject of the litigation was the financial gain that the university and researchers achieved by additionally charging money to companies by licensing the cell line.

Michael Heller and Rebecca Eisenberg are academic law professors who believe that biological patents are creating a "tragedy of the anticommons," "in which people underuse scarce resources because too many owners can block each other". Others claim that patents have not created this "anticommons" effect on research, based on surveys of scientists.

Professional societies of pathologists have criticized patents on disease genes and exclusive licenses to perform DNA diagnostic tests. In the 2009 Myriad case, doctors and pathologists complained that the patent on BRCA1 and BRCA2 genes prevented patients from receiving second opinions on their test results. Pathologists complained that the patent prevented them from carrying out their medical practice of doing diagnostic tests on patient samples and interpreting the results.

Another example is a series of lawsuits filed by the Alzheimer's Institute of America (AIA) starting in 2003 with the last ending in 2013, concerning a gene patent it controlled on the Swedish mutation and transgenic mice carrying it; the mutation that is important in Alzheimers. The mice are widely used in Alzheimer's research, both by academic scientists doing basic research and by companies that use the mice to test products in development. Two of these suits are directed to companies that were started based on inventions made at universities (Comentis and Avid), and in each of those cases, the university was sued along with the company. While none of the suits target universities that are conducting basic research using the mice, one of the suits is against Jackson Labs, a nonprofit company that provides transgenic mice to academic and commercial researchers and is an important repository of such mice. Ultimately all the suits failed; the suit against Jackson Labs failed after the NIH granted it protection as a government contractor.

== See also ==
- American Type Culture Collection (ATCC)
- Bioethics
- Biopiracy
- Budapest Treaty
- Commercialization of indigenous knowledge
- Diamond v. Chakrabarty was a United States Supreme Court case dealing with whether genetically modified micro-organisms can be patented.
- Genetically modified food
- Human Genome Project
- Intellectual property
- John Moore (patent)
- Pharmaceutical patent
- Plant breeders' rights
- Stem cell controversy
- Traditional knowledge
