= National Scientist of the Republic of Korea =

2005–2012 annual award in South Korea

- Country: South Korea
- Presented by: Ministry of Education, Science and Technology
- Reward: Multi-year research funding
- First award: 2005
- Number of laureates: 11 as of 2012

- National Scientist of the Republic of Korea
- Hangul: 대한민국국가과학자
- Hanja: 大韓民國國家科學者
- RR: Daehanminguk gukga gwahakja
- MR: Taehanmin'guk kukka kwahakcha

National Scientist of the Republic of Korea (Korean: 대한민국국가과학자) was an award bestowed between 2005 and 2012. The prize was established by the Ministry of Education, Science and Technology to achieve the world's best research results by providing research funds of 1.5 billion KRW per year to a total of 10 scientists. Research prize funding ended when their affiliation changed. Envisioned as the highest scientific award of the nation, it was initially presented to Hwang Woo-suk in 2005 under the name Top Scientist (최고과학자) with an annual funding prize of 3 billion KRW given over three years. Due to his scandal, the award was withdrawn from Hwang, the name of the prize was changed and the research funding was reduced. The reformed award was given in 2006, 2007, 2010 and last bestowed in 2012. The end of the award coincided with the founding of the Institute for Basic Science with five laureates changing their affiliation to the new institute.

== Laureates ==
Year	Laureate	Institution
2006	Rhee Sue-goo (이서구); Shin Hee-Sup (신희섭)	Ewha Womans University; Korea Institute of Science and Technology
2007	Ryoo Ryong (유룡)	KAIST
2010	Kim V. Narry (김빛내리); Noh Tae-won (노태원); Nam Hong Gil (남홍길); Kim Kwang Soo (김광수); Hwang Jun-Muk (황준묵)	Seoul National University; Seoul National University; Pohang University of Science and Technology; Pohang University of Science and Technology; Korea Institute for Advanced Study
2012	Kaang Bong-Kiun (강봉균); Kim Seungu (김승우)	Seoul National University; KAIST

== See also ==
- Top Scientist and Technologist Award of Korea
- National Scientist of the Philippines
- Honored Scientist of Azerbaijan
