= Noh Tae-won =

South Korean physicist (born 1957)

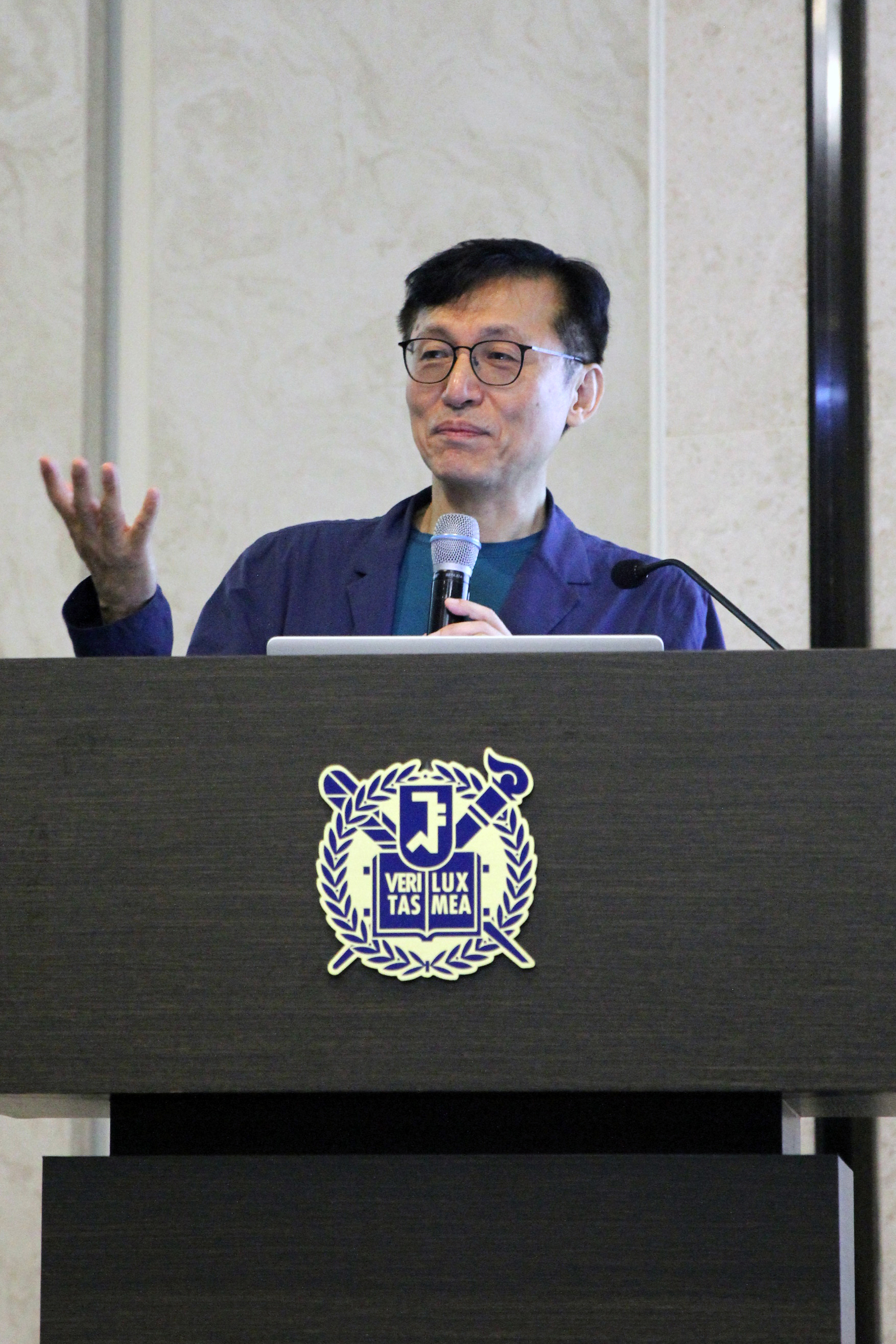
- Born: August 4, 1957 (age 69); Incheon, South Korea
- Education: B.Sc. Seoul Nat'l Univ., South Korea; Ph.D. Ohio State University, United States; Post Doc. Cornell University, United States
- Known for: 1. Optical properties of solids, including composite materials, high-Tc superconductors, colossal magnetoresistance(CMR) manganites, and other transition metal oxides 2. Metal-insulator transitions and orbital physics in transition metal oxides.; 3. Pulsed laser deposition of oxide films and artificial heterostructures 4. Physical phenomena at oxide surfaces or interfaces 5. Physics of oxide devices, such as FeRAM, RRAM, and spintronic devices
- Awards: 9th Korea Science Award in physics (2004); Gyeongam Award (Gyeongam Education Foundation, 2009); National Scientist of the Republic of Korea (Ministry of Education, Science and Technology, South Korea, 2010); Korean Best Scientist and Engineer Award (Ministry of Education, Science, and Technologies, South Korea, 2011)
- Scientific career
- Fields: Condensed Matter Physics
- Workplaces: Seoul National University, Institute for Basic Science
- Thesis: Optical properties of some metal-insulator composites (1986)
- Doctoral advisor: James R. Gaines
- Website: Center for Correlated Electron Systems

- Noh Tae-won
- Hangul: 노태원
- Hanja: 盧泰元
- RR: No Taewon
- MR: No T'aewŏn

Noh Tae-won (Korean: 노태원; born August 4, 1957) is a South Korean physicist and director of the Center for Correlated Electron Systems (CCES) in the Institute for Basic Science (IBS) at Seoul National University (SNU). He has published more than 400 papers and been cited 15,000 times. He is a member of the Materials Research Society, Korean Optical Society, Korean Crystallographic Society, and Association of Asia Pacific Physical Societies and has been on several editorial boards for journals. In 2017, he became president of the Korean Dielectrics Society. In 2024, he became the 9th president of the Korea Institute for Advanced Study.

== Education ==
Noh graduated from Kyunggi High School in Seoul, South Korea, in 1976 and received his B.Sc. (1982) in Physics from Seoul National University. Supervised by Dr. James R. Gaine, he obtained his M.S. and Ph.D. in physics from Ohio State University in 1984 and 1986, respectively.

== Career ==
Noh conducted postdoctoral research in Dr. Albert John Sievers' group at Cornell University until 1989. During that period, he studied the optical properties of high-Tc superconductors, especially copper oxide. In August 1989, he joined the faculty of the Department of Physics at Seoul National University starting as an assistant professor before becoming an associate and later full professor.

He was the director of the Research Center for Oxide Electronics at SNU from 2000.

With funding from the Institute for Basic Science, he established the Center for Correlated Electron Systems at Seoul National University in 2012. The research center searches for new emerging phenomena at the interfaces of strongly correlated electron systems, such as oxides.

He became an Endowed-Chair Professor at SNU in 2017.

In 2019, the Center for Correlated Electron Systems and the Institute for Solid State Physics (ISSP) of the University of Tokyo opened a joint research laboratory at Seoul National University.

Noh performs research in condensed matter physics. His research has focused on transition metal oxides but has extended to other strongly correlated electron systems. His research interests include the growth of oxide thin films and artificial heterostructures, emerging phenomena in oxide surfaces and interfaces, the metal-insulator transition and orbital physics in transition metal oxides, the optical properties of numerous solids, and the physics of oxide devices such as ferroelectric random-access memory (FeRAM), resistance RAM (RRAM), and spintronic devices.

He has worked on novel nanoscale physical phenomena, especially in informational devices such as FeRAMs and RRAMs. He elucidated the physical mechanism of the fatigue problem in FeRAMs. He also addressed the critical thickness of ultrathin films where they lose ferroelectricity. Additionally, he sought to explain resistance-switching phenomena, which are the basis of RRAM. Recently, he developed a new percolation model, called the "random circuit-breaker network model", which can explain reversible switching phenomena. He also discovered a novel quantum state of the correlated electron system in iridates that has attracted the interest of many researchers. He investigated the Mott physics of Sr2IrO4, which has a Mott insulator phase in the Jeff = 1/2 state.

In the Korean Physical Society (KPS), he has served as treasurer (FY 1999–2000), executive officer (FY 2003–04), and vice president (FY 2009–12). He served as a council member trustee of the Association of Asia and Pacific Physical Societies from 2011 – 2013, is on the board of trustees at the Asia Pacific Center for Theoretical Physics, and the International Advisory Board of the Asian Meeting on Ferroelectricity. In 2014, he became a member of the International Union of Physics and Applied Physics. He has served on the editorial boards of several international journals, including Applied Physics Letters, and as editor-in-chief of Current Applied Physics.

== Awards and honors ==
- 2022: Order of Science and Technology Merit
- 2000: Scientist of the Month Award (National Research Foundation of Korea)
- 2000: Award for Outstanding Paper (Korean Federation of Science and Technology Societies)
- 2000: Research Award (College of Natural Science, Seoul National University)
- 2003: Ikeda Award (Ikeda Memorial Foundation, Japan)
- 2003: Korea Science Award (National Research Foundation of Korea)
- 2006: Scopus Citation Award (Elsevier)
- 2009: Kyung-Ahm Prize (Kyung-Ahm Education & Culture Foundation)
- 2010: National Scientist of the Republic of Korea (Ministry of Education, Science and Technology)
- 2011: Korean Best Scientist and Engineer Award (Ministry of Education, Science and Technology and Korean Federation of Science and Technology Societies)
- 2014: Creative Leading Scientist Grant (Seoul National University)
- 2019: Sung-Bong Prize (Korean Physical Society)

== Conferences ==
He has also helped to organize numerous international conferences as a member of international advisory or program committees. Noh was Chair of the 5th Korea–Japan Conference on Ferroelectricity (KJC-FE5, 2004), the International Workshop on Oxide Electronics (WOE-2007), and the Joint Conference of the Asian Meeting on Ferroelectricity and the Asian Meeting on Electroceramics (AMF-AMEC-2010). He has also served on the International Advisory or Program Committees of over 40 other international conferences. He has given over 100 invited talks at international conferences. He has also delivered plenary talks at international conferences, including IMF-11 (2005, Brazil), JKC-FE6 (2006, Japan), AAPC-11 (2010, China), KPS (2011, Busan), and AMEC (2012, Malaysia).

== See also ==
- Ferroelectricity
- Lithium iridate
