= International R&D Academy =

School managed by the Korea Institute of Science and Technology

The International R&D Academy (IRDA) is a research school established in 2001 that is managed by the Korea Institute of Science and Technology.

== Purpose ==
The goal of the program is to train and educate prospective scientists and engineers from developing countries to become leading researchers in academia and industry in their respective countries. Emphasis is placed on transferring knowledge to developing countries, specifically: accumulated Korean experience in R&D, commercialization of innovative technologies, and R&D management skills.
