= Kim Dong-man =

South Korean food engineer (born 1955)

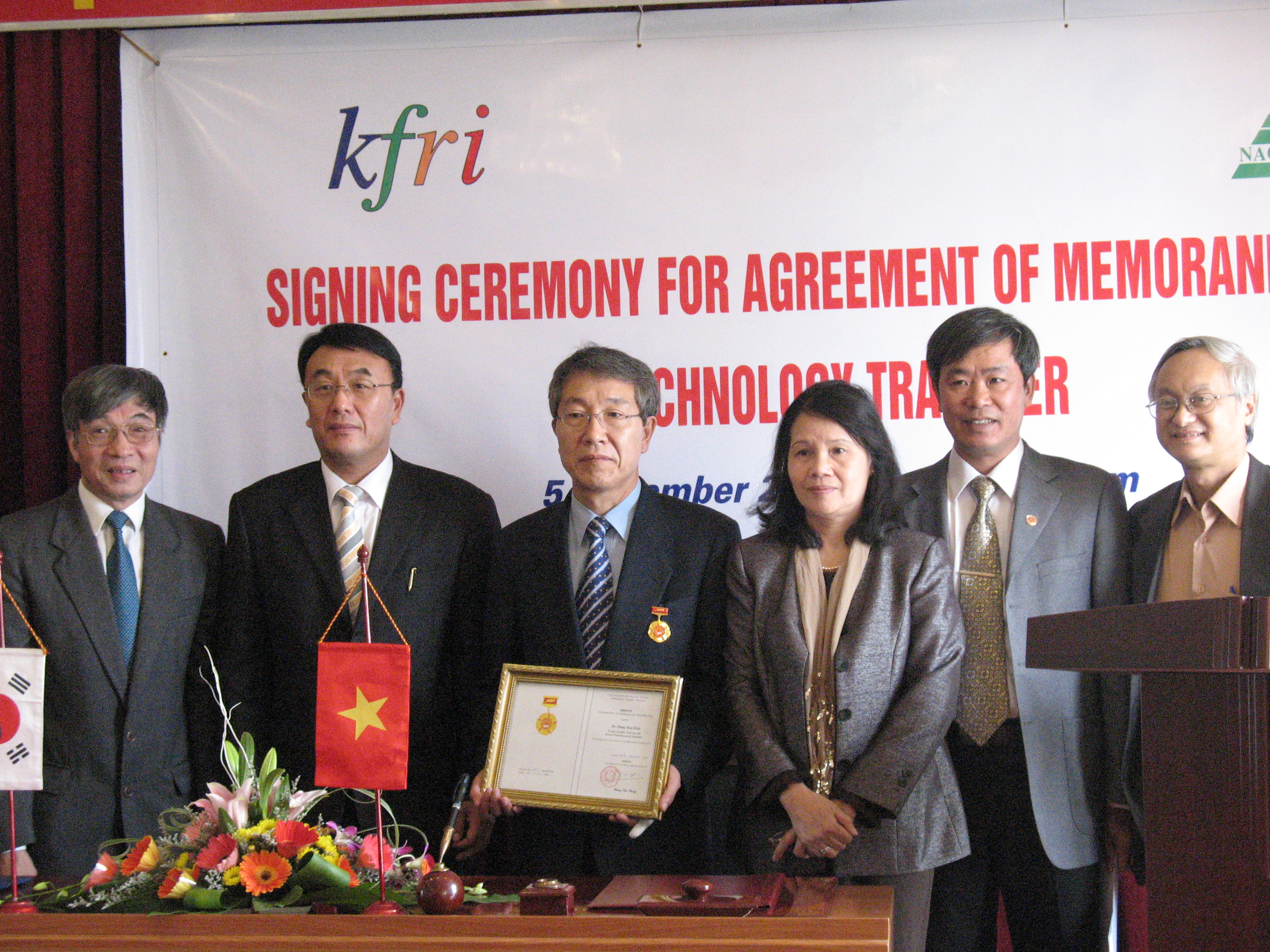
Medal of Merit for Science and Technology, Government of Vietnam, December 5, 2007

Kim Dong-man (Korean: 김동만, born May 11, 1955) is a South Korean food engineer. He is an expert in post-harvest management of fresh produce.

In 1980, he began his career as a researcher in the Food Science Lab of Korea Institute of Science and Technology. His initial field of research was on the storage and distribution of fresh agricultural products. After 1988, he has worked at the Korea Food Research Institute, where he conducted research on processing, packaging, storage, and distribution technologies for fresh agricultural products, and teach technologies both domestically and abroad. He has published 210 research reports, 50 domestic and foreign patents, and 230 research papers individually or jointly. He served as Director of the Korea-ASEAN FTA Cooperation Project, Head of Convergence Technology Research Division of Korea Food Research Institute, Vice Chairman of the Korea Food Storage and Distribution Society, and KOICA advisor.

He learned agricultural distribution technology from GTZ in Germany for rural areas of the Republic of Korea, which was still a developing country in the 1980s. After 1994, with the advance of Korea's food engineering to some extent, he has been carrying out aid projects to improve management of post-harvest fresh agricultural products for technically lagging Southeast Asian countries. The targets include countries such as the Philippines (FDC), Vietnam (NACENTECH), Cambodia (CADRI), Indonesia (PAJAJALAN UNIV.), Myanmar, Azerbaijan, etc. In recognition of his achievements in this project, he was awarded the Plaque of Appreciation and the Merit Medal by the Philippine President and the Vietnamese government, respectively.

Since 2011, he has served as Director of the Korea-ASEAN FTA Cooperation Project, focusing mainly on Myanmar, the poorest member of the ASEAN member countries in terms of Per capita income. Based on KOICA's budget, the Korea Food Research Institute established the "Postharvest Technology Training Centre" to help Myanmar, which has suffered losses of 30-70% after harvesting. Since January 2015, the educational facility has been acquired and operated by the Ministry of Agriculture and Irrigation of Myanmar. Kim Dong-man received the Myanmar Government Citation from Vice President Nian Thun on March 2, 2015, in recognition of his contribution to improving the distribution structure of agricultural products in Myanmar and building a foundation for food engineering technology.

== Career ==
- August 1980: Korea Advanced Institute of Science and Technology (KIST) Food Engineering Lab. (Senior Researcher)
- June 1982: German Federal Institute for Nutrition (Karlsluhe, visiting researcher)
- May 1988: Korea Food Research Institute (Responsible Researcher)
- September 1995: Korea-Philippines, Korea-Vietnam Agricultural Products Distribution Technology Development Research Director
- October 1997: Korean Commissioner of ATC in APEC (Food Processing, Storage, Distribution)
- October 2000: Head of Planning and Coordination Division, Korea Food Research Institute
- May 2002: Head of Korea-ASEAN post-harvest management technology cooperation project
- May 2006: Head of Korea-Azerbaijan Agricultural Products Distribution Technology Cooperation Project
- November 2007: Head of Korea-Cambodia/Myanmar Distribution Technology Cooperation Project
- January 2008: Head of Korea-ASEAN FTA Agricultural Products Distribution Technology Cooperation Project
- September 2011: Head of Convergence Technology Research Division, Korea Food Research Institute
- September 2011: Head of KOICA Myanmar agricultural products post-harvest management technology cooperation project

== Education ==
- February 1978: Graduated from Department of Food Science and Technology, College of Agriculture, Chungnam National University (Bachelor of Agriculture)
- August 1980: Graduated from Chungnam National University, Department of Food Engineering (Master of Agriculture)
- August 1987: Graduated from the Department of Food Science and Technology, Graduate School of Dongguk University (Doctor of Engineering)
- October 1992: Completion of post-doc course, Department of Food Science and Technology, Cornell University, USA

== Award ==
- June 2002: Appreciation Plaque for Technology Transfer, President of the Philippines
- November 2003: Excellence Research Award, President of the Republic of Korea
- December 2007: Medal of Merit for Science and Technology, Government of Vietnam
- March 2015: Commendation for distribution of agricultural products, Government of Myanmar
