= Kyung-Ahm Prize =

South Korean award

- Country: South Korea
- Presented by: Geum-Jo Song
- First award: 2005
- Website: Kyung-Ahm Education & Cultural Foundation

- Kyung-Ahm Prize
- Hangul: 경암학술상
- Hanja: 耕岩學術賞
- RR: Gyeongam haksulsang
- MR: Kyŏngam haksulsang

The Kyung-Ahm Prize (Korean: 경암학술상) is a series of awards presented annually from the Kyung-Ahm Education & Cultural Foundation. Founded in 2005 with a 100 billion KRW endowment by Geum-Jo Song, the award originally had four categories and in addition to the award, laureates are given 100 million KRW to 200 million KRW in prize money; the highest nationally. The foundation also hosts academic lectures by laureates.

== Recipients ==
The award has been given to the following individuals among four to six categories. For certain years, there is not a winner under some categories.

Year	Humanities & Social Science	Natural Science	Life Science	Engineering	Arts	Special Prize
2005	Cho Dong-il (조동일)	Paik Young-Ki (백융기)		Lee Byeong Gi (이병기)	Chung Kyung Wha (정경화)	–
2006	Lew Young Ick (유영익)	Rey Soo-Jong (이수종)		Lee Kunwoo (이건우)	Chong Hyon-jong (정현종)	–
2007	Han Young Woo (한영우)	Nam Wonwoo (남원우)		Lee Heun (이흔)	Chin Unsuk (진은숙)	–
2008	Jung Myung Hwan (정명환)	Kim Jeong Han (김정한)	Chung Jongkyeong (정종경)	Kim Bumman (김범만)	Yoon Kwang-cho (윤광조)	–
2009	Kim Kyung-Man (김경만)	Noh Tae Won (노태원)	Kim Young-Joon (김영준)	Yang Seung-Man (양승만)	Paik Kun-Woo (백건우)	–
2010	Baik Kyung Hwan (백경환)	Cho Minhaeng (조민행)	Won-Jae Lee (이원재)	Lee Kwang-hee (이광희)	Kim Chi-ha (김지하)	–
2011	Keel Hee-Sung (길희성); Kim Yung Sik (김영식)	Hong Byung-hee (홍병희)	Koh Gou Young (고규영)	Kim Seung-Woo (김승우)	Julia H. Moon (문훈숙)	Park Byeongseon (박병선)
2012	Lee Chong-Sik (이정식)	Yong-Geun Oh (오용근)	Kaang Bong-Kiun (강봉균)	Lee Young Moo (이영무)	–	–
2013	Lee Young-hoon (이영훈)	Chang Sukbok (장석복)	Lee Min Goo (이민구)	Paik Jeom Kee (백점기)	–	Kim Dae-joong (김대중)
2014	Kim Jaegwon (김재권)	Kim Soo-Bong (김수봉)	Chun Jang-Soo (전장수)	Yoo Hoi-Jun (유회준)	–	–
2015	Kim Uchang (김우창)	Kang Hyeonbae (강현배)	Baek Sung-hee (백성희)	Choi Mansoo (최만수)	–	–
2016	Kwon Heonik (권헌익)	Ihee Hyotcherl (이효철)	Changjoon Justin Lee (이창준)	Sun Yang-Kook (선양국)	–	–
2017	Kim Kyong-Dong (김경동)	Yeom Han-woong (염한웅)	Yoon Tae-Young (윤태영)	Lee Jong-Ho (이종호)	–	Seung H-Sang (승효상)
2018	–	Keum JongHae (금종해)	–	Hoon Sohn (손훈)	–	Kwon O-Gon (권오곤)
2019	Lee Geun (이근)	Lee Young-hee (이영희)	Hwang Cheolsang (황철상)	Seok Sangil (석상일)	–	–
2020	Sung Nak-in (성낙인)	Yoon Juyoung (윤주영)	Lee Jeongho (이정호)	Hwang Cheol Seoung (황철설)	–	–
2021	–	Choe Yeongju (최영주)	Kim Hyeongbeom (김형범)	Lee Byoungho (이병호)	–	–
2022	Lee Jong-Wha (이종화)	Kim Junseong (김준성)	Kim Jaebeom (김재범)	Jo Dongho (조동호)	–	–
2023	Im Hyeonjin (임현진)	Shim Heungseon (심흥선)	Ju Yeongseok (주영석)	Lee Taeu (이태우)	–	–
2024	Kwon Young-min (권영민)	Park Seungbum (박승범)	Heo Won Do (허원도)	Cho Gyechun (조계춘)	–	Kim Eun Sun (김은선)
2025	–	Kim You Soo (김유수)	Huh Jun R. (허준렬)	Kim Ho Young (김호영)	–	Kim Sang Bae (김상배)
2026	Hasok Chang (장하석)	Nam-Gyu Park (박남규)	Roh Soung-Hun (노성훈)	Sang Ouk Kim (김상욱)	–	–
