= Lee Sang-hee (politician, born 1938) =

South Korean politician (1938–2023)

Member of the National Assembly of South Korea
- In office 30 May 1996 – 29 May 2004
- In office 11 April 1981 – 29 May 1988

Minister of Science and Technology
- In office 5 December 1988 – 18 March 1990
- Preceded by: Lee Kwan
- Succeeded by: Jeong Geun-mo

Personal details
- Born: 1 September 1938 Cheongdo County, Korea, Empire of Japan
- Died: 13 September 2023 (aged 85)
- Party: DJP; NKP; GNP
- Education: Seoul National University

Lee Sang-hee (Korean: 이상희; 1 September 1938 – 13 September 2023) was a South Korean politician. A member of the Democratic Justice Party, the New Korea Party, and later the Grand National Party, he served in the National Assembly from 1981 to 1988 and again from 1996 to 2004. He was also Minister of Science and Technology from 1988 to 1990.

Lee died on 13 September 2023, at the age of 85.

== Election results ==
Year	Elections	Constituency	Political party	Votes (%)	Results
1981	11th National Assembly General Election	National (51st)	DJP	5,776,624 (35.64%)	Elected
1985	12th National Assembly General Election	National (27th)	DJP	7,040,477 (35.25%)	Elected
1988	13th National Assembly General Election	Busanjin A (Busan)	DJP	56,853 (44.25%)	Defeated (2nd)
1996	15th National Assembly General Election	Nam A (Busan)	NKP	47,134 (64.69%)	Won
2000	16th National Assembly General Election	Proportional representation (7th)	GNP	7,365,359 (38.96%)	Elected
