= Kwang Soo Kim =

South Korean chemist and physicist (born 1950)

- 김광수 (金光洙)
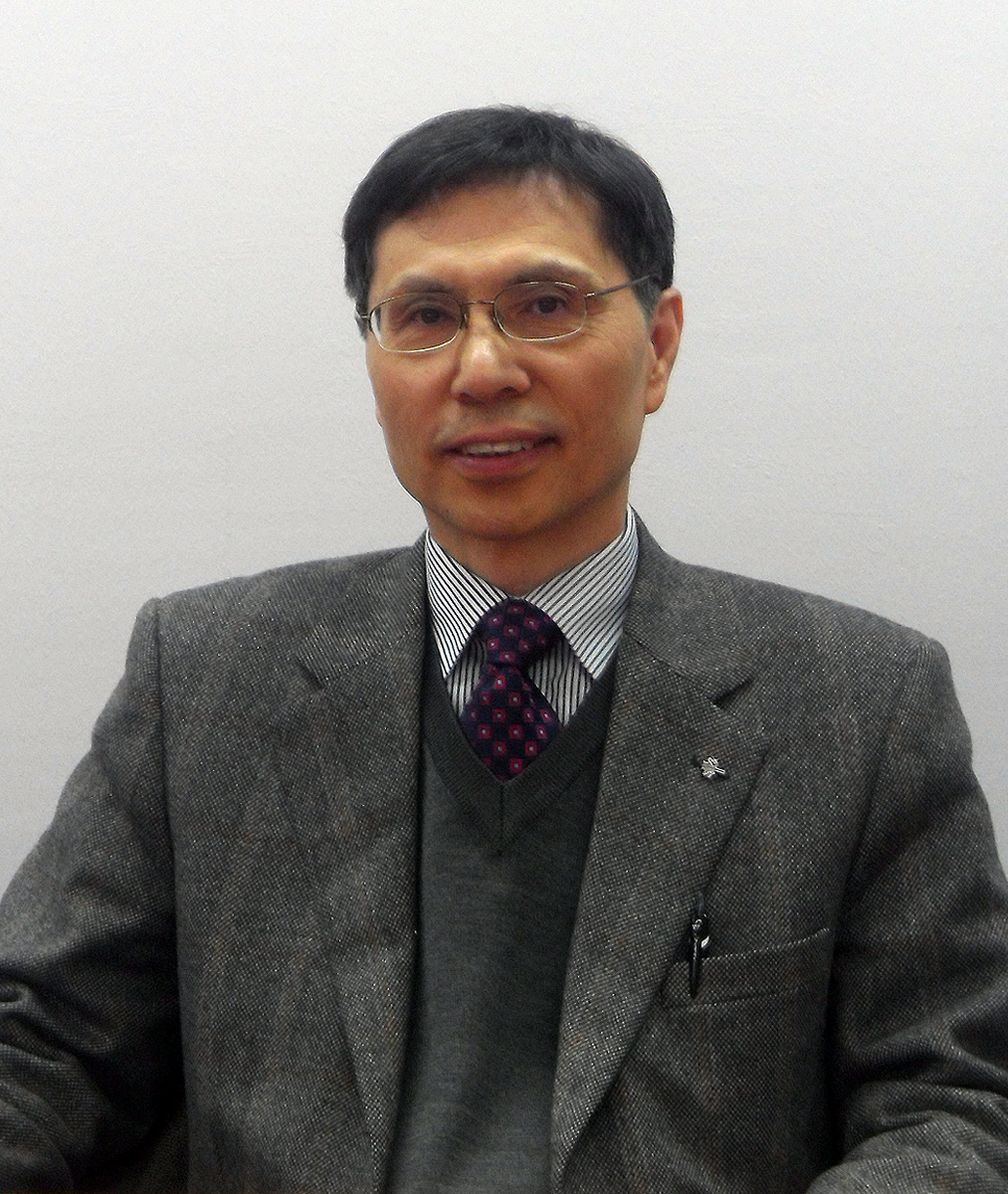
- Born: February 6, 1950 (age 76)
- Education: Seoul National University (BS, MS); Korea Advanced Institute of Science and Technology (MS); University of California, Berkeley (PhD)
- Website: csm.unist.ac.kr/kim/index.html

Kwang Soo Kim is a South Korean professor of chemistry, an adjunct professor in physics, and the director of Center for Superfunctional Materials (CSM), of Ulsan National Institute of Science and Technology (UNIST) in South Korea.

Kim was named a National Scientist of the Republic of Korea by South Korea's Ministry of Education, Science and Technology in 2010.

== Education ==
Kim received his B.S. and M.S. degrees in applied chemistry from Seoul National University (1971, 1973) and also an M.S. degree in physics from Korea Advanced Institute of Science and Technology (KAIST) (1975). He obtained his Ph.D. degree from University of California, Berkeley (1982). His research fields include Theoretical/Computational Chemistry/Physics and Experimental Nanosciences.

== Professional experience ==
He spent a few years as an IBM Postdoctoral Fellow and Research Assistant Professor at Rutgers University. He worked as a professor in POSTECH from 1988 to 2014, and he is currently a Distinguished Professor at Ulsan National Institute of Science and Technology (UNIST).

== Research ==
Kim and his research group are interested in both theoretical/computational chemistry/physics and experimental nanosciences. Specifically, the fields of research that they contribute to include investigation of ab initio theory, molecular dynamics simulation, nonequilibrium thermodynamics and entanglement perturbation to provide understanding of intermolecular interactions, clusters, molecular recognition, drug design and nanomaterials. Furthermore, his team is developing functional molecules/materials for molecular sensing and engineering, nanodevices, green chemistry, DNA sequencing and energy storage.

== Positions ==
- Director Center for Superfunctional Materials (CSM), UNIST (2014–present)
- Distinguished Professor of Dept. of Chemistry, UNIST (2014–present)
- Director of CSM, Pohang University of science and Technology POSTECH (1997–2014)
- Professor of Dept. of Chemistry at Pohang University of Science & Technology POSTECH (1988–2014)
- Visiting Scholar, Dept. Elect. Engineering & Nano Center, Columbia University (2004–2005)
- Visiting Scientist/Professor, Dept. of physics, MIT (1994–1995)
- Visiting assistant professor, Researcher Assistant Professor, Rutgers University (1985–1987)
- Postdoctoral Researcher Fellow, IBM (1982–1985)
- Instructor, Assistant professor, Dept. of Physics Chungnam National University. (1975–1978)

== Awards and honors ==
- Mulliken Lecture, University of Georgia, USA (2011)
- Ranked within the top 500 chemists (only one among Korean nationals): H-index ranking of well known living chemists: Update online by Chemistry World, UK, on Dec 12,2011
- National Scientist of the Republic of Korea (2010)
- Korea Premium Science and Technology Award (2010)
- Fukui medal from Asia-Pacific Association of Theoretical and Computational Chemistry (APATCC) (2010)
- International Academy of Quantum Molecular Science (IAQMS): membership elected (2009)
- POSTECH Fellow (2009–2014)
- Korea Science Award from Korean President (2004)
- Academic Achievement Award from the Korean Chemical Society (2001)

== Publications ==
Kim published over 400 papers in prestigious journals such as Nature, Science, Nature Nanotechnology, Nature Communications, Chemical Reviews, Chemical Reviews Society, Proc. Natl. Acad. Sci, Accounts of Chemical Research, Physical Review Letters, Journal of the American Chemical Society, Angewandte Chemie International Edition, Chemistry - A European Journal, Organic Letters, The Journal of Organic Chemistry, Physical Review, The Journal of Chemical Physics, The Journal of Physical Chemistry, etc.

=== Books and chapters ===
- Dykstra, Clifford; Frenking, Gernot; Kim, Kwang; Scuseria, Gustavo, eds. (2011). Theory and Applications of Computational Chemistry: The First Forty Years. Elsevier. ISBN 978-0-08-045624-9.

=== Selected publications ===
- Lee, Ju Young; Hong, Byung Hee; Kim, Woo Youn; Min, Seung Kyu; Kim, Yukyung; Jouravlev, Mikhail V.; Bose, Ranojoy; Kim, Keun Soo; Hwang, In-Chul; Kaufman, Laura J.; Wong, Chee Wei; Kim, Philip; Kim, Kwang S. (2009). "Near-field focusing and magnification through self-assembled nanoscale spherical lenses". Nature. 460 (7254): 498–501. Bibcode:2009Natur.460..498L. doi:10.1038/nature08173. S2CID 4398757.

J. Y. Lee, et al.

- Min, S. K.; Kim, W. Y.; Cho, Y.; Kim, K. S. (2011). "Fast DNA sequencing with a graphene-based nanochannel device". Nature Nanotechnology. 6 (3): 162–5. Bibcode:2011NatNa...6..162M. doi:10.1038/nnano.2010.283. PMID 21297626.
- Kim, Kwang S.; Kim, Woo Youn (July 2008). "Prediction of very large values of magnetoresistance in a graphene nanoribbon device". Nature Nanotechnology. 3 (7): 408–412. Bibcode:2008NatNa...3..408K. doi:10.1038/nnano.2008.163. PMID 18654564.

W. Y. Kim and K. S. Kim

- Hong, BH; Bae, SC; Lee, CW; Jeong, S; Kim, KS (2001-10-12). "Ultrathin Single-Crystalline Silver Nanowire Arrays Formed in an Ambient Solution Phase" (PDF). Science. 294 (5541): 348–351. Bibcode:2001Sci...294..348H. doi:10.1126/science.1062126. PMID 11546837. S2CID 21634760.
- Hong, Byung Hee; Choi, Jae-Young; Kim, Philip; Ahn, Jong-Hyun; Kim, Kwang S.; Kim, Jong Min; Lee, Sang Yoon; Jang, Houk; Zhao, Yue; Kim, Keun Soo (February 2009). "Large-scale pattern growth of graphene films for stretchable transparent electrodes". Nature. 457 (7230): 706–710. Bibcode:2009Natur.457..706K. doi:10.1038/nature07719. PMID 19145232. S2CID 4349731.

K. S. Kim, Y. Zhao, H. Jang, S. Y. Lee, J. M. Kim, K. S. Kim, J.-H. Ahn, P. Kim, J.-Y. Choi and B. H. Hong

- Bae, S; Kim, H; Lee, Y; et al. (August 2010). "Roll-to-roll production of 30-inch graphene films for transparent electrodes". Nature Nanotechnology. 5 (8): 574–578. Bibcode:2010NatNa...5..574B. CiteSeerX 10.1.1.176.439. doi:10.1038/nnano.2010.132. PMID 20562870. S2CID 51912502.
- Kim, Kwang S.; Yu, Seong Uk; Lee, Jung Woo; Hwang, In-Chul; Singh, N. Jiten; Chun, Young (2013-04-30). "Calix[n]imidazolium as a new class of positively charged homo-calix compounds". Nature Communications. 4 1797. Bibcode:2013NatCo...4.1797C. doi:10.1038/ncomms2758. PMC 3644089. PMID 23653209.

Y. Chun, N. J. Singh, I.-C. Hwang, J. W. Lee, S. U. Yu, and K. S. Kim

- Kim, Kwang S.; Lee, Jae Sung; Youn, Duck Hyun; Le, Nhien H.; Kemp, K. Christian; Tiwari, Rajanish N.; Kumar, Susheel; Nath, Krishna; Tiwari, Jitendra N. (2013-07-31). "Stable platinum nanoclusters on genomic DNA–graphene oxide with a high oxygen reduction reaction activity". Nature Communications. 4 2221. Bibcode:2013NatCo...4.2221T. doi:10.1038/ncomms3221. PMC 3731667. PMID 23900456.

J. N. Tiwari, K. Nath, S. Kumar, R. N. Tiwari, K.C. Kemp, N. H. Le, D. H. Youn, J. S. Lee, K. S. Kim

- Kim, Kwang S.; Tarakeshwar, P.; Lee, Jin Yong (2000). "Molecular Clusters of π-Systems: Theoretical Studies of Structures, Spectra, and Origin of Interaction Energies". Chemical Reviews. 100 (11): 4145–4186. doi:10.1021/cr990051i. PMID 11749343.

K. S. Kim, P. Tarakeshwar, J. Y. Lee

- Georgakilas, Vasilios; Otyepka, Michal; Bourlinos, Athanasios B.; Chandra, Vimlesh; Kim, Namdong; Kemp, K. Christian; Hobza, Pavel; Zboril, Radek; Kim, Kwang S. (2012). "Functionalization of Graphene: Covalent and Non-Covalent Approaches, Derivatives and Applications". Chemical Reviews. 112 (11): 6156–6214. doi:10.1021/cr3000412. PMID 23009634.

V. Georgakilas, M. Otyepka, A. B. Bourlinos, V. Chandra, N. Kim, K. C. Kemp, P. Hobza, R. Zboril, and K. S. Kim

- Yoon, Juyoung; Kim, Sook Kyung; Singh, N. Jiten; Kim, Kwang S. (2006). "Imidazolium Receptors for the Recognition of Anions". Chemical Society Reviews. 35 (4): 355–60. doi:10.1039/B513733K. PMID 16565752.

J. Yoon, S. K. Kim, N. J. Singh and K. S. Kim

- Chandra, V; Park, J; Chun, Y; Lee, JW; Hwang, IC; Kim, KS (2010). "Water-dispersible magnetite-reduced graphene oxide composites for arsenic removal". ACS Nano. 4 (7): 3979–86. Bibcode:2010ACSNa...4.3979C. doi:10.1021/nn1008897. PMID 20552997.
- Rajan, Arunkumar Chitteth; Rezapour, Mohammad Reza; Yun, Jeonghun; Cho, Yeonchoo; Cho, Woo Jong; Min, Seung Kyu; Lee, Geunsik; Kim, Kwang S. (2014). "Two Dimensional Molecular Electronics Spectroscopy for Molecular Fingerprinting, DNA Sequencing, and Cancerous DNA Recognition". ACS Nano. 8 (2): 1827–1833. Bibcode:2014ACSNa...8.1827R. doi:10.1021/nn4062148. PMID 24446806.

A. C. Rajan, M. R. Rezapour, J. Yun, Y. Cho, W. J. Cho, S. K. Min, G. Lee, and K. S. Kim

- Cho, WJ; Kim, J; Lee, J; Keyes, T; Straub, JE; Kim, KS (2014). "Limit of Metastability for Liquid and Vapor Phases of Water". Physical Review Letters. 112 (15) 157802. Bibcode:2014PhRvL.112o7802C. doi:10.1103/PhysRevLett.112.157802. PMID 24785073.

- Hong, Byung Hee; Lee, Jin Yong; Lee, Chi-Wan; Kim, Jong Chan; Bae, Sung Chul; Kim, Kwang S. (2001). "Self-Assembled Arrays of Organic Nanotubes with Infinitely Long One-Dimensional H-Bond Chains". J. Am. Chem. Soc. 123 (43): 10748–10749. Bibcode:2001JAChS.12310748H. doi:10.1021/ja016526g. PMID 11674012.

B. H. Hong, J. Y. Lee, C.-W. Lee, J. C. Kim, S. C. Bae, and K. S. Kim

- Baek, SB; Moon, D; Graf, R; Cho, WJ; Park, SW; Yoon, TU; Cho, SJ; Hwang, IC; Bae, YS; Spiess, HW; Lee, HC; Kim, KS (2015). "High-temperature in situ crystallographic observation of reversible gas sorption in impermeable organic cages". Proc. Natl. Acad. Sci. U.S.A. 112 (46): 14156–61. Bibcode:2015PNAS..11214156B. doi:10.1073/pnas.1504586112. PMC 4655546. PMID 26578758.

== Editor and board memberships of international journals ==
- Journal of Physics Chemistry A, B, C (Am. Chem. Soc.)-(2015–present)-Senior Editor
- Wiley Interdisciplinary Reviews: Computational Molecular Science (Wiley)-(2011–present)
- Chemistry Letters (Chem. Soc. Japan)-(2010–present)
- NPG Asia Materials (Nature Publishing Group)-(2009–present)
- Chemical Physics Letter (Elsevier)-(2009–present)
- Advances in Physical Chemistry (Hindawi)-(2008–present)
- Computational and Theoretical Chemistry (Elsevier)-(2007–present)
- Chemistry-An Asian Journal (Wiley-VCH)-(2006–2013)
- Journal of Computational Chemistry (Wiley- VCH)-(2005–present)
- Bulletin of Korean Chemical Society (2000–2009) (Associate Editor)

== Patents ==
- B. H. Hong, J. Y. Lee, and K.S. Kim, Synthesis and applications of nanoscale lens through self-assembly process, Patent No: 10-1166415, Registration Date : 2012.07.11, Application No:10-2009-0084121 (2009.9.7), Country Registered: Korea
- S. K. Min, W. Y. Kim, Y. Cho, K. S. Kim, Device and method for ultrafast DNA sequencing based on graphene nanoribbons, Patent No: 10-12972226, Registration Date : 2013.8.9, Application No: 10-2011-0056530 (2011.06.10), Country Registered: Korea [그래핀 나노리본을 이용한 초고속 염기서열 분석 소자 및 방법]
- B. H. Hong, J. Y. Lee, P. Kim, and K.S. Kim, Growth and applications of ultralong carbon nanotubes, Patent No : US 8,080,281 B2, Registration Date : 2011.12.20, Application No:12/412,984, Country Registered: USA [USA Patent No, : PCT/US2007/020778 (60/848,023); (2007.9.27)]
- V. Chandra, Y. Chun, J. W. Lee, I.-C. Hwang, K. S. Kim, Hybrid materials comprising graphene and iron oxide, Method for manufacturing the same and Apparatus for treating waste water using the same, Application No:13/279,291, Filing Date :2011.10.23, Country Registered: USA. "Hybrid materials comprising graphene and iron oxide, Method for manufacturing thereof and Appratus for treating waste water using thereof ", Application No: 10–2010–0038705, Filing Date : 2010.04.26, Country Registered: Korea
- W. Y. Kim and K. S. Kim, Spin-valve devices based on graphene nanoribbons, [그래핀 나노리본을 이용한 스핀밸브 소자], Patent No: 10-0980680, Registration Date : 2010.09.01, Application No:10-2008-0077414, Country Registered: Korea
- B. H. Hong, C.-W. Lee, and K.S. Kim, Synthesis of organic nanotubes having suitable electrochemical and photochemical properties and synthesis of ultrathin nanowires using same as templates, European Patent No. (EP 1264919; 02 002 096.2, December 2002), Korean Patent No. (0439579, 2004), USA patent No. (6762331, 2004).
- S. J. Lee and K. S. Kim, Copyrighted S/W: POSMOL (Pohang Sci-tech MoLecular modeling package), Application No:2000-01-12-4239, Filing Date : 2000.06, Country Registered: Korea
