= Hong Byung-hee =

South Korean chemist (born 1971)

Byung-Hee Hong
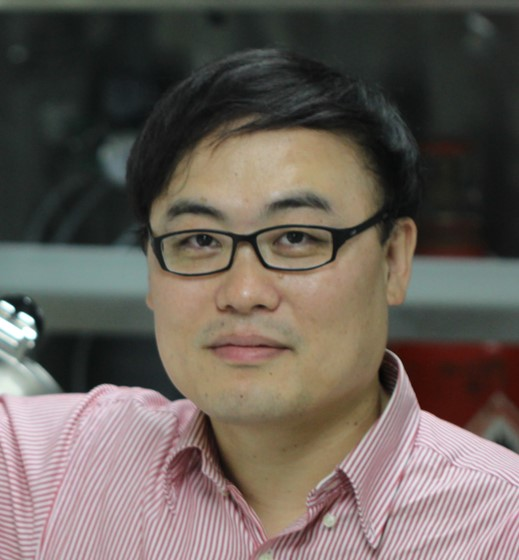
- Hong in 2014
- Born: March 25, 1971 (age 55); South Korea
- Education: Pohang University of Science and Technology
- Scientific career
- Fields: Department of Chemistry
- Workplaces: Professor, Department of Chemistry, Seoul National University
- Doctoral advisor: Kwang Soo Kim

Byung Hee Hong is a professor of the department of chemistry at Seoul National University. Hong developed the method of synthesizing large-scale graphene by chemical vapor deposition (CVD), which triggered chemical researches toward the practical applications of graphene. His papers reporting the large-scale growth of graphene have been intensively cited by many graphene researchers.

Hong is the founder of Graphene Square and pioneered the large-scale synthesis of graphene by chemical vapor deposition (CVD), which triggered chemical research towards the practical application of graphene. His first report on CVD synthesis of graphene (Nature, 2009) has recorded the world highest citations in chemistry among the papers published since 2009 (roughly 5000 times). One year later, he developed the synthesis of ultra-large graphene based on roll-to-roll methods and its application to flexible touch screens (Nature Nanotechnology, 2010), which is believed to be the first demonstration of application of graphene materials in practical electronic devices. The related key patents have been registered in Korea, US, Japan, and China. For this contribution, he was invited to give a talk in the Nobel Symposium on Graphene (2010). He has made more than 90 patent applications on graphene synthesis and applications. Hong's research has been highlighted by Bloomberg Businessweek, BBC, CNBC, New York Times, Financial Times, Russia Today, MIT Technology Review, C&EN News (cover story), Physics Today, and Physics World. He is now acting as a Scientific Advisory Committee member of the €1 billion Graphene Flagship project together with 4 Nobel Laureates and as a Scientific Advisory Member of Cambridge Graphene Center, UK. He is currently an Advisory Member for CTO of LG Electronics. He served as a member of R&D Strategy and Planning Committee for Korean National Graphene Commercialization Project.

== Education ==
- 2002 : Ph.D., Chemistry, Pohang University of Science and Technology
- 2000 : M. S., Chemistry, Pohang University of Science and Technology
- 1998 : B. S., Chemistry, Pohang University of Science and Technology

== Work ==
- 2017 : Professor, Department of Chemistry, College of Natural Sciences, Seoul National University
- 2011 : Associate Professor, Department of Chemistry, College of Natural Sciences, Seoul National University
- 2007–2011 : Assistant Professor, Department of Chemistry at Sungkyunkwan Advanced Institute of Nanotechnology (SAINT)

== Awards ==
- 2009: POSCO Cheong-Am Bessemer Fellowship, TJ Park Foundation
- 2010: SKKU Young Fellowship, Sungkyunkwan University
- 2010: Joong-Ang Daily - Yumin Award of Science
- 2011: Kyung-Ahm Prize of Natural Science
- 2012: Excellent Researcher Award (Korean Chemical Society)
- 2012: Creative Knowledge Award (Ministry of Education, Sci. and Tech.)

== Representative Publications ==
- 2001 : Hong, Byung Hee (2001). "Ultrathin Single-crystalline Silver Nanowire Arrays Formed in an Ambient Solution Phase". Science. 294 (5541): 348–351. Bibcode:2001Sci...294..348H. doi:10.1126/science.1062126. PMID 11546837. S2CID 21634760.
- 2001 : Hong, Byung Hee (2001). "Self-assembled arrays of organic nanotubes with infinitely long one-dimensional H-Bond chains". J. Am. Chem. Soc. 123 (43): 10748–10749. Bibcode:2001JAChS.12310748H. doi:10.1021/ja016526g. PMID 11674012.
- 2005 : Hong, Byung Hee (2005). "Quasi-continuous growth of ultralong carbon nanotube arrays". J. Am. Chem. Soc. 127 (44): 15336–15337. Bibcode:2005JAChS.12715336H. CiteSeerX 10.1.1.644.6567. doi:10.1021/ja054454d. PMID 16262374.
- 2006 : Hong, Byung Hee (2006). "Covalently bridging gaps in single-walled carbon nanotubes with conducting molecules". Science. 311 (5759): 356–359. Bibcode:2006Sci...311..356G. CiteSeerX 10.1.1.476.3577. doi:10.1126/science.1120986. PMID 16424333. S2CID 543366.
- 2009 : Hong, Byung Hee (2009). "Near-field focusing and magnification through self-assembled nanoscale spherical lenses". Nature. 460 (7254): 498–501. Bibcode:2009Natur.460..498L. doi:10.1038/nature08173. S2CID 4398757.
- 2009 : Hong, Byung Hee (February 2009). "Large-Scale Pattern Growth of Graphene Films for Stretchable Transparent Electrodes". Nature. 457 (7230): 706–710. Bibcode:2009Natur.457..706K. doi:10.1038/nature07719. PMID 19145232. S2CID 4349731.
- 2010 : Hong, Byung Hee (2010). "Roll to roll production of 30 inch graphene films for transparent electrodes". Nature Nanotechnology. 5 (8): 574–578. Bibcode:2010NatNa...5..574B. CiteSeerX 10.1.1.176.439. doi:10.1038/nnano.2010.132. PMID 20562870. S2CID 51912502.
- 2010 : Hong, Byung Hee (2010). "Wafer-Scale Synthesis and Transfer of Graphene Films". Nano Lett. 10 (2): 490–493. arXiv:0910.4783. Bibcode:2010NanoL..10..490L. doi:10.1021/nl903272n. PMID 20044841. S2CID 2166360.
