= Jung-Mo Lee =

South Korean psychologist (born 1944)

Jung-Mo Lee (Korean: 이정모; born March 26, 1944) is a South Korean cognitive psychologist and cognitive scientist. His main areas of study include language, human memory, history of psychology, and foundations of cognitive science. He received his PhD in memory and language from Queen's University, Ontario, Canada in 1979. He currently is a Professor Emeritus at Sungkyunkwan University in Seoul.

== Personal life ==
Lee was born on March 26, 1944, in Wonju, Korea, Empire of Japan, to Chang-Ho Lee and Oakja Jo. He graduated from Wonju Middle School and Wonju High School. He attended (1962–66) the College of Liberal Arts & Sciences, Seoul National University, majoring in Psychology (B.A. in 1966). After his military service of three years, he attended graduate school, Seoul National University, majoring in Experimental Psychology (MA in 1971). During his graduate days, he was on the scholarship of Woo-San Foundation.

He is married to Heisook Lee, a mathematician and professor in the Department of Mathematics, Ewha Womans University in Seoul. They have a son.

== Career ==
After working (two and half years) as a research assistant at the Student Guidance Center of Seoul National University, he attended the Graduate School of Queen's University, Kingston, Ontario, Canada, majoring experimental psychology (MA in 1976; PhD in 1979). His Adviser was Professor David J. Murray, whose main research areas were human memory and history of psychology. His M.A. thesis was on Endel Tulving's Encoding Specificity theory and his PhD dissertation was on the 'Depths of Processing', titled "Deeper Processing: Spreading Elaboration and Integrative Elaboration." After returning to South Korea, he briefly took an assistant professorship at the Department of Psychology at Songsim Catholic College (which is now called as the Songsim campus of Catholic University in Seoul), and then worked as an associate professor and then professor of the Department of Psychology, Korea University, in Seoul (1980–94), After that, he worked as a research associate at the Institute for Cognitive Science (ICS), University of Colorado at Boulder (1984–85), then as a visiting scholar at the Committee on the Conceptual Foundations of Science (the precursor of the 'History of Science and Medicine'), University of Chicago (1985). Then he worked as a professor at the Department of Psychology, and at the Graduate Program for Cognitive Science of Sungkyunkwan University in Seoul (1986-2009). In 1995, he founded the Interdisciplinary Graduate Program for Cognitive Science at Sungkyunkwan University. He was a visiting scholar at the Department of Cognitive Science, UCSD. He is now a Professor Emeritus of Sungkyunkwan University.

He also served as the President of the Korean Society for Cognitive Science (KSCS; 1999), the Editor of the Korean Journal of Psychology (1982–84; 1985–86) of the Korean Psychological Association (KPA), the President of the Korean Society for Experimental & Cognitive Psychology(1991–93) – which is currently the Korean Society for Cognitive & Biological Psychology (KSCBP), a member of the Board of the Brain Science Research Center (BSRC), KAIST, Korea (1997–2007), a member of the Advisory committee of the Korean Brain Society (KBS), an Adviser to the Korean Society for the Korean Society for the Mind, Brain & Education (KSMBE), the Vice President of the Faculty Association of the Sungkyunkwan University, and a member of the Steering Committee of the International Conference of Cognitive Science (ICCS; 1997–2007). As of 2013, he holds the following positions: a member of the Planning and Advisory Board of the KSCS, KBS, KSCBP and KSMBE. He also serves as an adviser to the TOINMO – a forum of the South Korean young scholars in cognitive science.

== Selected bibliography ==
- 2012. Jeong, Jaeseung; Kaang, Bong-Kiun; Lee, Jung-Mo; 이, 현숙; Choi, Kiwoon (July 25, 2012). 인간과 우주에 대해 아주 조금밖에 모르는 것들 [What don't we know? Science 125 Questions] (in Korean). 낮은산 (published July 20, 2012). p. 288. ISBN 9788989646822.
- 2010. "Cognitive Science: Past, Present, & Future". Hakjisa. 221 pages. ISBN 9788963303796
- 2009. "Cognitive Science: Interdisciplinary Convergence and Applications". SKKU Publishing Group. 741 pages. ISBN 9788979867848
- 2001. "Cognitive Psychology: Its History of Formation, Conceptual Foundations, and Perspectives". Acarnet. 720 pages. ISBN 9788989103448
