= Choi Kiwoon =

South Korean physicist (born 1959)

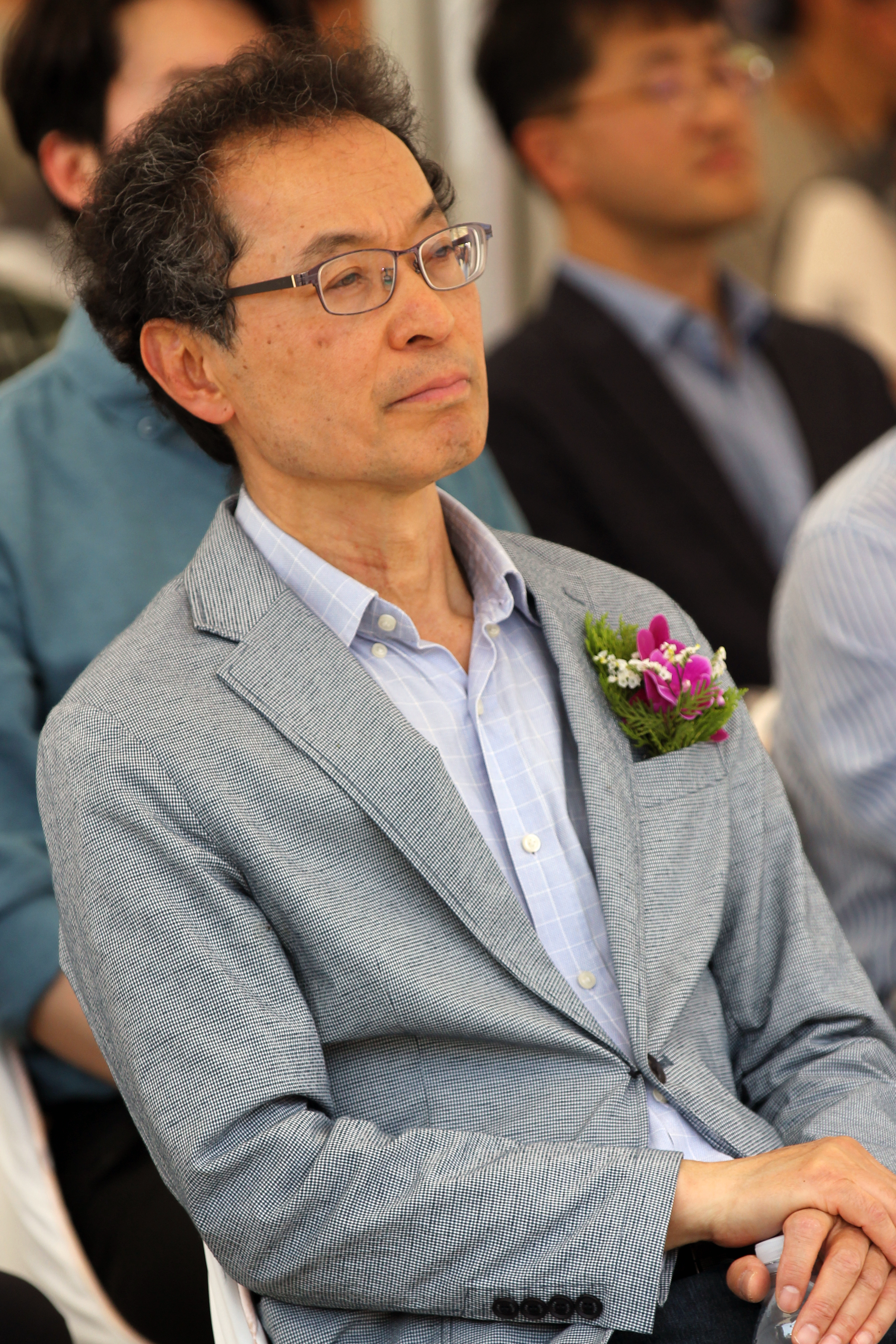
- Born: 7 November 1959
- Education: Seoul National University
- Awards: Korea Science Award, National Scholar, Scientific Citation Laureate
- Scientific career
- Fields: Particle physics, cosmology, physics beyond the Standard Model, dynamical symmetry breaking, string phenomenology
- Workplaces: Harvard, Johns Hopkins, Carnegie-Mellon, UC San Diego, Chonbuk National University, KAIST, Institute for Basic Science
- Thesis: Dynamical solutions of the strong CP problem (1985)

Korean name
- Hangul: 최기운
- Hanja: 崔基雲
- RR: Choe Giun
- MR: Ch'oe Kiun
- Website: Center for Theoretical Physics of the Universe

Choi Kiwoon (Korean: 최기운; born 7 November 1959) is a theoretical particle physicist researching focusing on particle theory and cosmology. He was a research professor at Chonbuk National University and a full professor at KAIST. He is the founding director of the Institute for Basic Science Center for Theoretical Physics of the Universe. He is a member of the Korean Academy of Science and Technology.

== Education ==
Choi received his B.S., M.S. and Ph.D. in physics from Seoul National University in 1981, 1983, and 1986, respectively.

== Career ==
Moving to the United States, Choi started his career as a visiting postdoctoral research associate at Harvard in 1986. Next he was postdoctoral research associate at Johns Hopkins University in 1987, Carnegie Mellon from 1988 to 1990, and UC San Diego from 1990 to 1992. Returning to Korea, the next two years were spent as a research professor at Chonbuk National University. A majority of his career was in KAIST in Daejeon, starting as an assistant professor in 1994, associate professor in 1996, and full professor from 2001. Leaving KAIST, he became the founding director of the Center for Theoretical Physics of the Universe (CTPU), established November 2013. Research at CTPU focuses on physics beyond the Standard Model, including understanding the fundamental theoretical frameworks of physics and investigating the origin of the universe through particle physics.

== Honors and awards ==
- 2011: Korea Science Award, Ministry of Science, ICT and Future Planning and National Research Foundation of Korea
- 2007: National Scholar, Ministry of Education and Human Resources Development and Korea Academic Promotion Foundation
- 2007: Scientific Citation Laureate Award, Thomson Scientific and Korea Science and Engineering Foundation

== Publications ==
- Jeong, Jaeseung; Kaang, Bong-Kiun; Lee, Jung-Mo; 이, 현숙; Choi, Kiwoon (20 July 2012). 인간과 우주에 대해 아주 조금밖에 모르는 것들 [What don't we know? Science 125 Questions] (in Korean). 낮은산. p. 288. ISBN 9788989646822.
