= Yoon Kwang-cho =

South Korean ceramic artist (born 1946)

- Hangul: 윤광조
- Hanja: 尹光照
- RR: Yun Gwangjo
- MR: Yun Kwangjo

Yoon Kwang-cho (Korean: 윤광조; born January 30, 1946) is a South Korean ceramic artist.

His works have been shown at the Philadelphia Museum of Art, the Seattle Art Museum and the Birmingham Museum of Art in Alabama, and are part of the regular collections of The Metropolitan Museum of Art, the British Museum, the Royal Museum of Mariemont and the Smithsonian National Museum of Natural History.

In 2004, he won the "Artist of the Year" award from the National Museum of Contemporary Art, Korea, for his significant contribution to the development of Korean contemporary ceramic art. In 2008, he was given the Kyung-Ahm Prize. His studio is in Gyeongju, South Korea.

== Style and nature of his work ==
Yoon specializes in his own variants on the traditional Korean ceramic style called buncheong. He has modified this style, using angular shapes decorated with brushwork in white. He often represents aspects of Kyongju in his work.

== Biography ==
Yoon Kwang-cho was born in Hamhung, present-day North Korea. He attended school in South Korea, graduating from Hong-Ik University in Seoul in 1973. He then studied at the Karatsu Kiln in Japan (an age-old center for Korean ceramics), becoming inspired to work in the traditional Korean pottery known as buncheong.

== See also ==
- List of Korean ceramic artists and sculptors
- Korean ceramics
