= Jong-Wha Lee =

South Korean economist

Jong-Wha Lee (Korean: 이종화) is a South Korean economist and former senior advisor for international economic affairs to former president Lee Myung-bak of South Korea and Korean G-20 Sherpa. He is currently a professor of economics at Korea University, where he has been a member of the faculty since March 1993. He has previously served as Chief Economist and head of the Office of Regional Economic Integration at the Asian Development Bank.

== Biography ==
Lee obtained his Ph.D. (1992) and M.A. (1990) in economics from Harvard University and his M.A.(1983) and B.A. (1981) in economics at Korea University. He worked as an economist at the International Monetary Fund from 1992 to 1993 and taught at Harvard University from 1999 to 2000 as a visiting professor. He had also served as a consultant to the Harvard Institute for International Development, the Inter-American Development Bank, the International Monetary Fund, the United Nations Development Programme, and the World Bank.

Lee joined Korea University as an assistant professor in 1993 and has since been part of the faculty holding the position of professor since 2000. From 2003 to 2007 Lee was also the director of the International Center for Korean Studies at Korea University.

In 2007, he joined ADB as head of the Office of Regional Economic Integration (OREI). He helped promote the set up of the institutional framework for regional cooperation and integration of Asian countries, especially the Chiang Mai Initiative Multilateralization (CMIM) and the Asian Bond Markets Initiative (ABMI) by the ASEAN+3 economies that included the 10 members of the Association of Southeast Asian Nations (ASEAN) plus China, the Republic of Korea and Japan to guard against future financial crises. He later became chief economist.

From 2011 to 2013 he served as the senior adviser for International Economic Affairs to former president Lee Myung-bak. He also acted as the Korean G-20 Sherpa for the G-20 Summits held in Cannes (2011) and Los Cabos (2012). He currently writes a monthly column for Project Syndicate.

In 2022, he was awarded the Kyung-Ahm Prize.

== Research contribution ==
Lee has published many works and is one of the most well-known Asian economists. His studies in collaboration with Robert J. Barro measuring educational attainment of the population for a broad group of countries are widely cited. The dataset on educational attainment are available at www.barrolee.com. He has also written a number of papers on economic integration, crisis and growth including a well-known paper on the role of foreign direct investment.
