= Lee Kwang-hee =

South Korean physicist (born 1960)

- Born: 1960 (age 65–66); Seoul, South Korea
- Education: University of California, Santa Barbara
- Awards: 2010 Kyung-Ahm Prize in engineering
- Scientific career
- Workplaces: Gwangju Institute of Science and Technology
- Doctoral advisor: Alan J. Heeger

- Lee Kwang-hee
- Hangul: 이광희
- RR: I Gwanghui
- MR: I Kwanghŭi

Lee Kwang-hee, born in 1960, is a South Korean physicist. Since 2007, he has served as the director of the Research Institute for Solar and Sustainable Energy at the Gwangju Institute of Science and Technology (GIST).

== Biography ==
Lee is currently a full professor of the Materials Science & Engineering Department and a vice-director of the Heeger Center for Advanced Materials at the Gwangju Institute of Science and Technology (GIST) in Korea. His major areas of focus include polymer devices such as polymer LEDs, polymer solar cells, and polymer FETs using semiconducting and metallic polymers. He received a BS degree from Seoul National University in 1983, and a MS degree from KAIST in 1985. Lee then worked at the Korea Atomic Energy Research Institute as a Staff Researcher from 1985 to 1990. In 1990 he migrated to the US for his doctorate study at the University of California, Santa Barbara (UCSB) and obtained his Ph.D. in March 1995 under the supervision of Alan J. Heeger. After finishing his post-doctoral work at UCSB in 1997, Lee started his professorship at the Pusan National University in South Korea. In 2007, Lee moved to his current position of a Full Professor at GIST.

=== Scientific discoveries ===
- Established a theoretical model of charge dynamics in conducting polymers called the localization modified Drude model.
- Produced truly metallic polymers.
- Performed the fabrication of all-solution processable tandem polymer solar cells
- Internal quantum efficiencies approaching 100% were obtained in his polymer solar cells.
- He realized that the conductivity of conducting polymer films was increased by aligning polymer chains.
- Used statically charged self-assembled non-conjugated polyelectrolytes as an interfacial layer for inverted polymer solar cells
- Key role of interchain coupling in the metallic state of conducting polymers
