= Min Zhuo =

Canadian neuroscientist

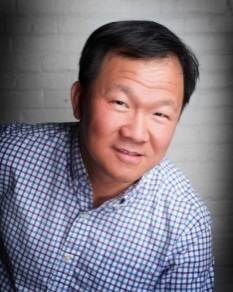
Min Zhuo

Min Zhuo (born 1964) is a pain neuroscientist at the University of Toronto in Canada. He is the Michael Smith Chair in Neuroscience and Mental Health as well as the Canada Research Chair in Pain and Cognition and a Fellow of the Royal Society of Canada. Zhou was hosted in 2017-2018 as a guest professor at the pharmacology institute at Heidelberg University, Heidelberg.

== Education ==
At the age of 16, Zhuo was admitted to the University of Science and Technology of China in Hefei — graduating in 1985. He obtained his PhD at the University of Iowa in Professor Jerry Gebhart's laboratory. In 1992, Zhuo joined Eric Kandel's laboratory at Columbia University where he showed CO-cGMP as key messengers for presynaptic LTP. In 1995, Zhuo spent one year in Richard Tsien's laboratory at Stanford University. In 1996, Zhuo moved to Washington University in St. Louis and focused on pain plasticity in the spinal cord and cortex. He showed that 'smart' mice suffered more pain, GluN2B and AC1 are novel therapeutic targets for treating chronic pain In 2003, he moved to the University of Toronto, and identified NB001 as a selective inhibitor for AC1. He co-established two online journals, Molecular Pain and Molecular Brain. In 2009, he was elected to Fellow of the Royal Society of Canada.

== Research ==
=== Early interests in pain and acupuncture: Shanghai ===
Born in 1964 in Xiapu, a seaside town in Fujian, China, Zhuo grew up inspired by the mountain villages and scenery. He started painting with the help of his mother and planned to pursue a career in art — perhaps as a teacher. It was not until later in life that he became interested in pursuing a career in science. In 1980, he was accepted into the University of Science and Technology of China in Hefei, from which he graduated in 1985. From there he went on to the Chinese Academy of Sciences, Shanghai Branch where his work focused mainly on the basic mechanism of acupuncture and pain.

=== Descending modulation of pain: Iowa 1988-1992 ===
In 1988, Zhuo joined Jerry Gebhart's laboratory at the University of Iowa as a visiting student. He then joined the graduate program as a PhD student. Using integrative pharmacological, electrophysiological, and behavioral methods, he discovered a novel descending facilitatory modulation of spinal nociceptive transmission from the RVM. Descending facilitation has a general impact on spinal sensory transmission, inducing sensory inputs from cutaneous and visceral organs. Recent studies found that descending facilitation is likely activated or to be up-regulated in chronic pain conditions, providing basic evidence for inhibiting descending facilitation to help to relieve chronic pain.

=== LTP and memory: Columbia & Stanford 1992-1995 ===
In 1992, Zhuo graduated from University of Iowa with PhD degree in pharmacology. The same year, he joined Eric Kandel's laboratory at Columbia University. During this time, Zhuo worked on hippocampal plasticity and showed that carbon monoxide (CO), together with nitric oxide (NO), may serves as retrograde messengers in hippocampal LTP. Together with Dr. Yinhe Hu, he further discovered that soluble guanylyl clcyaes (sGC) and cGMP-dependent protein kinase (PKG) act downstream from these diffusible messengers. Recent genetic studies confirm the importance of PKGs in central plasticity. In 1995, after being offered an independent faculty job at Washington University in St. Louis, Zhuo joined Richard Tsien’s laboratory in Stanford for one year. While at Stanford, Zhuo mastered whole-cell patch-clamp techniques and was the first one to show that direct patching of dendrites in isolated hippocampal neuronal preparations. Together with Ege Kavalali and Haruhiko Bito, they published together a key study on voltage-gated calcium channels in neuronal dendrites (or called dendrosomes).

=== Silent synapses in the cord: St. Louis ===
After finishing his postdoctoral training, Zhuo started his own laboratory in 1996, at Washington University in St. Louis. He decided to combine his knowledge of pain and synaptic plasticity of hippocampal memory, and explored possible changes in spinal cord dorsal horn. With the research assistance of Ms Ping Li, he identified silent synapses in spinal cord dorsal horn, and provided key synaptic mechanisms for possible recruitment of such silent nociceptive pathways in chronic pain conditions. It also provided synaptic mechanism for G protein coupled pathways in the facilitatory modulation of spinal sensory transmission. He further demonstrated that the interaction between AMPA receptor and PDZ proteins is critical, and inhibiting such interaction provide analgesic effects in animal model of chronic pain. He is the founding member of Washington University Pain center, and acted as chief for basic research until he left for Toronto in 2003.

=== From 'smart mice' to chronic pain ===
While working in St. Louis, Zhuo collaborated on a project with Professor Guosong Liu of MIT and Joe Tsien of Princeton University, where they discovered that enhancing NMDA NR2B receptors in the forebrain neurons enhanced LTP in the hippocampus. More importantly, such enhancement is selective, since LTD is not affected in the same mice. This work provides direct evidence that enhancing LTP can increase learning capacity. Because NMDA NR2B (GluN2B) is developmentally regulated, Zhuo decided to explore whether or not there is any evolutionary disadvantage to being 'smart'. Zhuo found that NR2B expression lead to the enhancement of chronic pain. These genetic and behavioral studies provide the first direct evidence that forebrain NMDA receptors play important roles in persistent pain.

=== Cortical plasticity as a key mechanism for chronic pain ===
In 2003, Zhuo moved to University of Toronto in Canada as EJLB-Michael Smith Chair in Neuroscience and mental health and Canada Research Chair (CRC). In Toronto, Zhuo decided to focus on synaptic plasticity in the anterior cingulate cortex, a key cortical region for pain, and has mapped the signalling pathways for LTP and LTD in the ACC. The discovery of LTP in pain-related cortex provides direct evidence for pathological mechanism of chronic pain as well as pain-related emotional disorders. Before these discoveries, most of academic and pharmaceutical investigators mainly focused on DRG and spinal cord when searching for new treatments for chronic pain.

=== Upregulation of cortical AMPAR and NMDA NR2B receptor after nerve injury ===
Upregulation of AMPARs and/or the increase of presynaptic release are known to contribute to synaptic potentiation and behavioural learning, while postsynaptic NMDA receptors are not significantly affected. Unlike in learning and memory, Zhuo found that cortical synapses and circuits are undergoing dramatic changes after peripheral never injury. In addition to postsynaptic AMPARs, Min found that NMDA receptors are significantly increased in the ACC as well as insular cortex. Inhibiting NMDA NR2B receptors in these brain areas produced significant analgesic effects in animal models of neuropathic pain. Positive feedback mechanisms at synaptic and circuit levels are proposed to explain why chronic pain is long-lasting and difficult to treat.

=== AC1 as a key target for pain plasticity and chronic pain ===
Between the time in St Louis and Toronto, Zhuo identified calcium stimulated adenylyl cyclase subtype 1 as being a key enzyme for triggering injury-related LTP in the ACC. Using gene knockout mice lacking AC1, he discovered that AC1 is critical for ACC LTP (including early- and late-phase LTP). While acute pain responses are normal in AC1 knockout mice, behavioral responses to peripheral injection of two inflammatory stimuli, formalin and complete Freund's adjuvant as well as nerve injury were reduced or abolished. Considering AC1 is highly expressed in neurons including the ACC, Zhuo proposed that AC1 acts as a key drug target for inhibiting chronic pain related plasticity in the brains. Unlike other targets, learning-related hippocampal LTP and behavioral learning and memory are not affected by AC1 gene deletion.

=== Gain in translation: NB001 as a novel drug for treating chronic pain in future ===
To search selective inhibitors for AC1, Zhuo has carried out rational drug design and chemical screening, and has a lead candidate AC1 inhibitor, NB001, which is relatively selective for AC1 over other adenylate cyclase isoforms. Using a variety of behavioral tests and toxicity studies, NB001, when administered intraperitoneally or orally, was found to have an analgesic effect in animal models of neuropathic pain, without any apparent side effects. The study thus shows that AC1 could be a productive therapeutic target for neuropathic pain and describes a new agent for the possible treatment of neuropathic pain.

== Honors and awards ==
- 2005: The EJLB-CIHR Michael Smith Chair in Neuroscience and Mental Health
- 2005: Canada Research Chair in Pain and Cognition, Tier I
- 2005: Chang Jiang Visiting Scholar in Neurobiology
- 2008: World-Class University Scholar, Seoul National University
- 2009: Elected to Royal Society of Canada
- 2012: AND investigator award
