= Young-min Kwon =

South Korean literary critic and academic (born 1948)

- Born: October 5, 1948 (age 77); Seoul, South Korea
- Occupations: Literary scholar, poet

Academic background
- Education: Seoul National University

Academic work
- Main interests: Modern Korean literature

Korean name
- Hangul: 권영민
- Hanja: 權寧珉
- RR: Gwon Yeongmin
- MR: Kwŏn Yŏngmin
- IPA: kwəːn jʌŋ.min

Young-min Kwon (Korean: 권영민; pronounced [kwəːn jʌŋ.min]; born 1948) is a South Korean literary scholar and poet. He is known for his works on the historical and Modern Korean literature and criticism. His works primarily focuses on the works of Yi Sang and Han Yong-un. Kwon has contributed to the popularization and globalization of Korean literature. As a visiting professor, he taught Korean language and literature at Harvard University (1985–1986), University of California, Berkeley (1992–1995), and the University of Tokyo (1999–2000). Also, he co-authored the textbook What is Korean Literature? in collaboration with Bruce Fulton from the University of British Columbia, one of his well-known works. What is Korean Literature? is the first Korean literature textbook translated into English.

This book has been used as a textbook in many different universities around the world, such as SOAS University of London and Ca' Foscari University in Venice. In addition, Kwon organized an international student exchange program for Korean literature and an international Korean literature translation workshop at Seoul National University. Because of Kwon's developments for an international exchange program and translational workshops, Seoul National University, Harvard, and UC Berkeley hold an annual student exchange program and several Korean literature translation workshops. The programs and workshops have helped graduate students build ties with other students abroad and take on careers in universities throughout the United States and South Korea. Furthermore, in regard to his academic contributions, Kwon has previously given a public lecture on Korean literature at the Literature House, Seoul, where he discussed the worth and interpretation of Yi Sang's works in his 2012 lecture "Reunion with Yi Sang" (이상과 다시 만나다). The Literature House is a specialized literary art space for its participants and holds programs such as literary lectures and poetry readings. In 2013, as a chairperson of the Humanities Popularization Committee (인문학대중화위원회 위원장), Kwon organized a Humanities concert series for the public in six cities of South Korea (Cheonan, Busan, Tongyeong, Gangneung, Gwangju, and Muan).

== Life and career ==
Young-min Kwon was born in Boryeong in South Chungcheong Province, South Korea, on October 5, 1948. He studied Korean literature at Seoul National University, where he received his BA (1971) and MA (1975). He also received his doctoral degree in 1984 from the same university. Before graduating, he started his tenure as a professor of Korean literature at Seoul National University, which lasted from 1981 to 2012. Also, he served as a visiting professor of Korean literature at Harvard-Yenching Institute from 1985 to 1986, at Berkeley University from 1999 to 2000, and at the University of Tokyo from 2000 to 2002. He held the position of the president of the Learned Society of Korean Modern Literature (한국현대문학회) from 2009 to 2011 and he became a chair professor at Dankook University in 2012. He has worked as a professor emeritus at Seoul National University since 2000.

== Achievements ==
=== The study of Yi Sang's works ===
Young-min Kwon argues that Yi Sang's writings reflect various elements of 20th Century modernity. He argues that Yi Sang's works deconstruct the content and form of the traditional novel since they have no form and use abstract styles through non-linear techniques and symbols. Kwon also argues that Yi Sang used film techniques in his novels, such as the rapid shift of scenes and the integration of contrasting motives. Furthermore, Kwon has also contributed to the reexamination of Japanese poems. Kwon argues that although these works are in Japanese, they still hold significance since they show a connection with modern Korean literature. He does so by expressing that these Japanese poems show new experimental techniques such as forming text through parody, delivering a poetic concept through montage, and varying poetic concepts through jumping and skipping. Kwon interprets Yi Sang's experimental poem "Ogamdo" (오감도) as a form of visual poetry. Kwon argues that the impact of a visual aspect on the text and typography helps to comprehend Yi Sang's originality.

=== The study of Yong-un Han's works ===
Kwon argues that Yong-un Han tried to embrace the public, using easy words as if he was talking to the readers. As Han's previously published works contained many Chinese characters that were intended for scholars to read, Kwon, in order to make Han's work more accessible to the public, published The Complete Works of Yong-un Han (만해 한용운 문학전집, 2011). In The Complete Series of Yong-un Han (2011), Kwon added annotations and 11 Chinese poems that were published in the discontinued magazine "Samgukgi" (삼국지) and the Japanese magazine "Hwayungi" (화융지). By publishing this book, Kwon helped readers understand and gain easier access to poems that were not accessible to the public. Furthermore, this is the first book to publish Han's Japanese magazine "Samgukgi", which was published in The Chosun Ilbo and discontinued during the Japanese colonial period. Moreover, Kwon discovered Han's previous Chinese poems from "Hwayungi" through his investigation, restructured Han's texts, and added annotations to fit the viewpoint of 21st Century readers.

== Criticism ==
Young-min Kwon left many works on Yi Sang and Korean contemporary literature. However, the reception of Kwon's contributions was not without scrutiny, as various scholars have engaged in critical assessments of his publications. Hyun-su Park, a professor of Korean literature at Kyungpook National University, argues that Kwon's The Dictionary of Yi Sang's Works (2017) maintains the misinterpretations of preceding research without correcting their errors. He argues that there is major confusion stemming from the description of Yi Sang's life, the incoherence of his resignation as a temporary employee in the Japanese Government General, and the different dates surrounding Yi Sang's employment. Some parts of the book state that Yi Sang resigned in 1933, and some assert that he resigned in 1932, which needs clarification. Literary critic Jeong Heo argues that another of Kwon's, The History of Korean Contemporary Literature, lacks an understanding of Changga (창가), a modern Korean enlightenment poem that borrows the melody from Western music. Moreover, Heo also argues that the historical period of the book should be changed from "Korean literature from 1945 to 2000" to "Korean literature from 1990 to 2000" since the book's content does not cover Korean literature from 1945 to 2000 but, instead, covers literature from 1990 to 2000. Heo also discusses the potential degradation of the Korean language, breaking the fixed formality of other traditional poems. Heo further critiques that the book should expand the literary history to embrace marginalized literature that includes women's literature, local literature, and popular literature.

== Awards ==
- 7th Dugye Scholarship Award (제7회 두계학술상, 1988)
- 5th Seoul Culture and Arts Criticism Award (제5회 서울문화예술평론상, 1988)
- 35th Contemporary Literature Award for Criticism (제35회 현대문학평론상, 1990)
- Gimhwantae Prize in Critique Literature (제4회 김환태 평론문학상, 1992)
- 9th Modern Buddhist Literature Criticism Award (제9회 현대불교문학평론상, 2004)
- Manhae Grand Prize Academy Award (만해대상 학술상, 2006)
- Seoul National University Academic Research Award (서울대학교 학술연구상, 2009)
- 5th Wooho Humanities Award (in the category of Korean Literature) (제5회 우호인문학상 (한국문학부문), 2013)
- 36th Sejong Cultural Award (in the Academic category) (제36회 세종문화상 (학술부문), 2017)

== Works ==
=== Main works ===
- A Study on Korean National Literature Theory (한국 민족문학론 연구, 1991)
- A Study on Modern Korean Writers (한국 현대 작가 연구, 1991)
- Biographical Dictionary of Modern Korean Writers (한국 현대 문인 대사전, 1991)
- The Language of Fiction and Destiny (소설과 운명의 언어, 1992)
- Young-min Kwon's Interpretation of Taebaek Mountains (권영민 교수의 태백산맥 읽기, 1995)
- The History of Korean Proletarian Literary Movement (한국 계급문학 운동사, 1997)
- The Modernity of Narrative Style and Discourse (서사 양식과 담론의 근대성, 1999)
- The History of Korean Contemporary Literature 1 (1896~1945) (한국 현대문학사 1(1896~1945), 2002)
- The History of Korean Contemporary Literature 2 (1945~2010) (한국 현대문학사 2(1945~2010), 2002)
- Dictionary of Korean Contemporary Literature (한국현대문학대사전, 2004)
- A History of Literature and Literary Criticism (문학사와 문학비평, 2009)
- A Study on Yi Sang's Texts (이상텍스트연구, 2009)
- Understanding Korean Contemporary Literature (한국 현대문학의 이해, 2010)

=== Edited works ===
- A Study on Sang-seop Yeom's Works (염상섭 문학연구, 1987)
- A Study on Dong-in Kim's Works (김동인 문학연구, 1988)
- The Literature of North Korea (북한의 문학, 1989)
- The Canon of Modern Korean Literature 1-9 (한국현대문학대계1-9, 1994)
- 100 Years of Modern Korean Novels 1, 2 (한국현대소설100년1, 2, 1995)
- 50 Years of Korean Literature (한국문학 50년, 1995)
- Korean Literary Criticism 1,2 (한국의 문학비평1, 2, 1995)
- Poems By Dongin Kim (김동리가 남긴 시, 1998)
- Azalea Bloomed in Pyongyang (평양에 핀 진달래꽃, 2002)
- Anthology of Korean New Novels 1-7 (한국신소설선집 (1-7), 2003)
- Nullin Hwantae Gim 60th Anniversary Memorial Compilation (눌인김환태60주기 추모문집, 2004)
- East Asian Literatures (동아시아문학, 2006)
- Experiment and Challenge, The Abyss of Colony (실험과 도전, 식민지의 심연, 2010)
- The Complete Series of Yong-un Han's Literary Works (한용운문학전집, 2011)
- The Collected Works of Yi Sang (이상전집, 2013)
