= Molecular Brain =

- Discipline: Neuroscience
- Language: English
- Edited by: Tsuyoshi Miyakawa, Bong-Kiun Kaang, Tim Bliss

Publication details
- History: 2008-present
- Publisher: BioMed Central
- Open access: Yes
- License: Creative Commons Attribution License
- Impact factor: 3.3 (2023)

Standard abbreviations
- ISO 4: Mol. Brain

Indexing
- CODEN: MBORAO
- ISSN: 1756-6606
- OCLC no.: 233191053

Links
- Journal homepage; Online access

Molecular Brain is a peer-reviewed open access scientific journal covering research on all aspects of the nervous system at the molecular, cellular and systems levels. The journal was established in 2008 and is published by BioMed Central. The founding editor is Min Zhuo (University of Toronto) and the editors-in-chief are Bong-Kiun Kaang (Seoul National University), and Tim Bliss (National Institute for Medical Research) and Tsuyoshi Miyakawa (Fujita Health University).

== Abstracting and indexing ==
The journal is abstracted and indexed in:

- Chemical Abstracts Service
- EMBASE
- EMBiology
- PsycINFO
- PubMed/MEDLINE
- PubMed Central
- Science Citation Index Expanded
- Scopus

According to the Journal Citation Reports, the journal has a 2014 impact factor of 4.902.
