= Nature Nanotechnology =

- Discipline: Nanotechnology
- Language: English
- Edited by: Alberto Moscatelli

Publication details
- History: 2006–present
- Publisher: Nature Publishing Group
- Frequency: Monthly
- Open access: No
- Impact factor: 38.3 (2022)

Standard abbreviations
- ISO 4: Nat. Nanotechnol.

Indexing
- CODEN: NNAABX
- ISSN: 1748-3387 (print); 1748-3395 (web)
- LCCN: 2006244070
- OCLC no.: 76826475

Links
- Journal homepage; Online archive

Nature Nanotechnology is a monthly peer-reviewed scientific journal published by Nature Publishing Group. It was established in October 2006. The editor-in-chief is Alberto Moscatelli. It covers all aspects of nanoscience and nanotechnology.

== Abstracting and indexing ==
The journal is abstracted and indexed in:

- Chemical Abstracts Service
- Science Citation Index
- Current Contents/Physical, Chemical & Earth Sciences
- Current Contents/Engineering, Computing & Technology
- Index Medicus/MEDLINE/PubMed

According to the Journal Citation Reports, the journal has a 2022 impact factor of 38.3.
