= Current Applied Physics =

Scientific journal

- Discipline: Applied physics, materials science
- Language: English
- Edited by: Hyunjung Kim

Publication details
- History: 2001—present
- Publisher: Elsevier
- Frequency: Monthly
- Impact factor: 2.8 (2025)

Standard abbreviations
- ISO 4: Curr. Appl. Phys.

Indexing
- ISSN: 1567-1739 (print); 1878-1675 (web)

Links
- Journal homepage; Online access; Online archive

Current Applied Physics is a peer-reviewed scientific journal published monthly by Elsevier on behalf of Korean Physical Society. Established in 2001, it covers applied physics as well as its applications in engineering and materials science. Its current editor-in-chief is Hyunjung Kim (Sogang University).

== Abstracting and indexing ==
The journal is abstracted and indexed in:

- Current Contents/Physical, Chemical & Earth Sciences
- Ei Compendex
- Inspec
- Science Citation Index Expanded
- Scopus

According to the Journal Citation Reports, the journal has a 2025 impact factor of 2.8.
