= Howard M. Goodman =

American molecular biologist

- Education: Williams College, MIT
- Scientific career
- Fields: Molecular Biology
- Workplaces: Massachusetts General Hospital, University of California, Berkeley
- Doctoral advisor: Alexander Rich

Howard M. Goodman is an American molecular biologist and a professor of genetics emeritus at Massachusetts General Hospital. He is best known for his role in founding the department of molecular biology at Massachusetts General Hospital.

== Education and Research ==
Goodman earned his B.S. in physics from Williams College and did his Ph.D. in biology from MIT in 1964 under the direction of Alexander Rich working on the mechanism of polyribosome activity. He did his postdoctoral research at the MRC Laboratory of Molecular Biology from 1964 to 1967 and at the University of Geneva.

Goodman worked at the University of California, San Francisco from 1970 to 1981 where he worked on the application of cloning techniques for the study of human genes including human growth hormone and insulin along with William J. Rutter. That work would be patented and lead to the introduction of recombinant biotech drugs. His group also worked on setting the foundation of Agrobacterium tumefaciens biology.

In 1981, Goodman would move to Massachusetts General Hospital to found the Department of Molecular Biology alongside Philip Leder who would establish the Department of Genetics. Backed by an 10-year $70 million agreement with Hoechst AG, Goodman started the department based on university-industry research relationships. He would serve as the department chair until his retirement in 2004. During that period, he established a program in plant biology with Frederick M. Ausubel cementing arabidopsis as a model system for plant research. During retirement, he joined Patricia Zambryski, a former postdoc, at the University of California, Berkeley to work on Arabidopsis biology.

== Personal life ==
Goodman met his wife Deborah Cohen while working in Geneva.
