= Molecular Pain =

- Discipline: Pain
- Language: English
- Edited by: Jianguo Gu, Min Zhuo

Publication details
- History: 2005-present
- Publisher: BioMed Central
- Frequency: Upon acceptance
- Open access: Yes
- License: Creative Commons Attribution License 4.0
- Impact factor: 3.774 (2012)

Standard abbreviations
- ISO 4: Mol. Pain

Indexing
- CODEN: MPOAC5
- ISSN: 1744-8069
- OCLC no.: 57465303

Links
- Journal homepage; Online archive

Molecular Pain is a peer-reviewed open access medical journal covering all aspects of research on pain. It was established in 2005 and is published by BioMed Central. The editors-in-chief are Jianguo Gu (University of Alabama at Birmingham) and Min Zhuo (University of Toronto), who was also the founding editor of the journal. It is sponsored by the University of Cincinnati College of Medicine.

== Abstracting and indexing ==
The journal is abstracted and indexed in:

- Biological Abstracts
- BIOSIS Previews
- Chemical Abstracts Service
- Current Contents/Life Sciences
- Embase
- Index Medicus/MEDLINE/PubMed
- PsycINFO
- Science Citation Index Expanded
- Scopus

According to the Journal Citation Reports, the journal has a 2012 impact factor of 3.774.
