= Ministry of Science and Technology (South Korea) =

1969–2008 South Korean government agency

- 과학기술부
- Logo used until 2005

Agency overview
- Formed: March 30, 1967
- Preceding agency: None
- Dissolved: 28 February 2008
- Superseding agency: Ministry of Education, Science and Technology (Most of this ministerial affairs); Ministry of Knowledge Economy (R&D Policy only)
- Jurisdiction: Government of South Korea
- Child agencies: Korea Meteorological Administration; Atomic Energy Agency (until 15 January 1973)

Korean name
- Hangul: 과학기술부
- Hanja: 科學技術部
- RR: Gwahak gisulbu
- MR: Kwahak kisulbu

The Ministry of Science and Technology (MoST) was a cabinet-level ministry of the government of South Korea which coordinated science and technology activities in the country. In 2008, it was combined with another ministry and renamed the Ministry of Education, Science and Technology. However, the Korean government under Park Geun-hye has re-launched the ministry under the Ministry of Science, ICT and Future Planning.
