= Korea Institute of Science and Technology =

Multi-disciplinary research institute in Seoul, South Korea

- 한국과학기술연구원
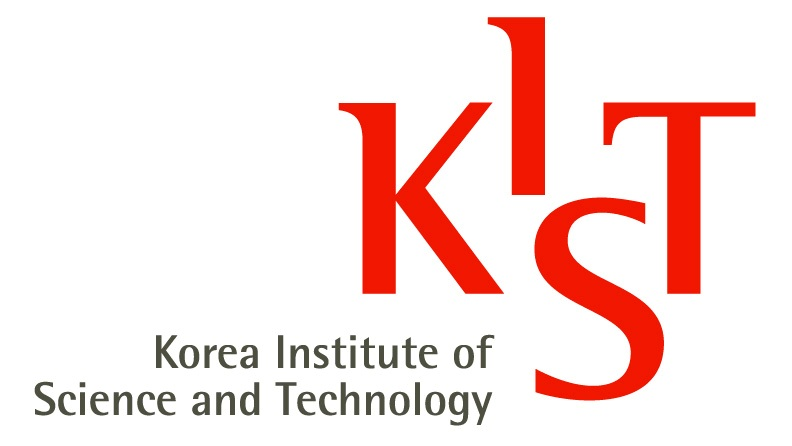
- Type: Public research institute
- Established: 1966
- President: Yoon, Seok Jin
- Location: Seoul, Republic of Korea
- Campus: Seoul
- Website: www.kist.re.kr (in Korean) www.kist.re.kr/eng/index.do (in English)

- Korea Institute of Science and Technology
- Hangul: 한국과학기술연구원
- Hanja: 韓國科學技術硏究院
- RR: Hanguk gwahak gisul yeonguwon
- MR: Han'guk kwahak kisul yŏn'guwŏn

The Korea Institute of Science and Technology (KIST; Korean: 한국과학기술연구원) is a multi-disciplinary research institute located in Seoul, South Korea. Founded in 1966, it was the first multi-disciplinary scientific research institute in Korea and has contributed significantly to the economic development of the country, particularly during the years of accelerated growth in the 1970s and 1980s. It has a research staff of over 1,800 research scientists, visiting scientists, fellows and trainees, and foreign scientists involved in basic research in various fields of science and technology.

== Headquarters and branch institutes ==
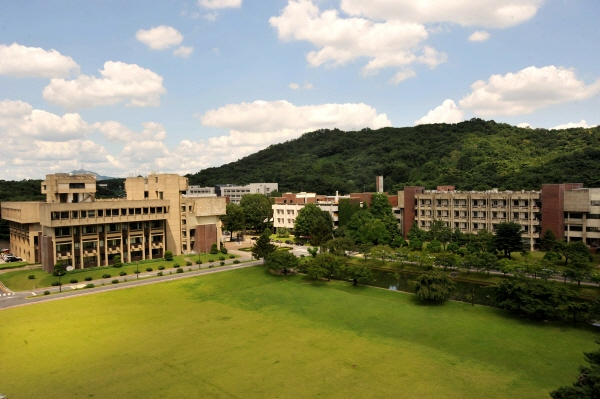
KIST Main Campus

=== Brain Science Institute ===
- Center for Neuroscience
- Center for Functional Connectomics
- Center for Neuro-Medicine
- Center for BioMicrosystems

=== Biomedical Research Institute ===
- Center for Bionics
- Center for Biomaterials
- Center for Theragnosis

=== Future Convergence Research Division ===
- Spin Device Research Center
- Nanomaterials Research Center
- Nanophotonics Research Center
- Interfacial Engineering Research Center
- High Temperature Energy Materials Research Center
- Nanohybrids Research Center
- Electronic Materials Research Center
- Biomolecular Functional Research Center
- Computational Science Research Center
- Center for Nanosystems*
- Nanomaterials Technology Development Center*
- Center for Traditional Science & Technology*
- Center for Metals & Materials Reliability Evaluation*

=== National Agenda Research Division ===
The National Agenda Research Division is responsible for the development of renewable energy sources, carbon cycle, water cycle and original technology for robotics.

- Fuel Cell Research Center
- Solar Cell Research Center
- Energy Storage Research Center
- Clean Energy Research Center
- Water Research Center
- Environmental Sensor System Research Center
- Energy Mechanics Research Center
- Interaction and Robotics Research Center
- Center for R-Learning Development, Promotion & Support*

=== Joint Laboratories at KIST ===
- KIST-SSSA
- KIST Europe Branch Lab

=== Overseas Joint Laboratories ===
- KIST-Purdue University
- KIST-Brookhaven National Laboratory

== Notable media coverage ==
Recently, KIST has been gaining significant media attention with its development of the English-teaching robot. It has been selected as one of ’50 Best Inventions of 2010’ by Time magazine and has been featured on CNN and The New York Times.
