= Ministry of Education, Science and Technology (South Korea) =

2008–2013 South Korean government agency

Ministry of Education, Science and Technology, Republic of Korea
- 교육과학기술부

Agency overview
- Formed: February 29, 2008
- Preceding agency: Ministry of Education and Human Resource Development; Ministry of Science and Technology
- Dissolved: March 23, 2013
- Superseding agency: * Ministry of Science, ICT and Future Planning; Ministry of Education
- Jurisdiction: Government of South Korea
- Headquarters: Central Government complex, 77-6 Sejong-no, jong-no, Seoul
- Agency executives: Kim Do-yeon (last), Minister; Kim Ung-gweon, 1st Vice Minister of Education, Science and Technology; Cho Rae-yul, 2nd Vice Minister of Education, Science and Technology
- Website: Official English Site

Korean name
- Hangul: 교육과학기술부
- Hanja: 敎育科學技術部
- RR: Gyoyuk gwahak gisulbu
- MR: Kyoyuk kwahak kisulbu

The Ministry of Education, Science, and Technology was a cabinet-level division of the government of South Korea. It was created on February 29, 2008 with Kim Doh-Yeon as its first minister.

In March 23, 2013, the Ministry had been split into Ministry of Science, ICT and Future Planning and the Ministry of Education.

== List of Ministers ==
| No. | Portrait | Name | Term of office | | | President |
| No. | Portrait | Name | Took office | Left office | Time in office | President |
|---|---|---|---|---|---|---|
| 1 | | Kim Do-yeon 김도연 金道然 (born 1952) | 29 February 2008 | 5 August 2008 | 2 years, 24 days | Lee Myung-bak |
| 2 | | Ahn Byong-man 안병만 安秉萬 (1941–2022) | 6 August 2008 | 30 August 2010 | 2 years, 24 days | Lee Myung-bak |
| 3 | | Lee Ju-ho 이주호 李周浩 (born 1961) | 30 August 2010 | 10 March 2013 | 2 years, 192 days | Lee Myung-bak |
| 4 | | Seo Nam-soo 서남수 徐南洙 (born 1952) | 11 March 2013 | 22 March 2013 | 164 days | Park Geun-hye |
