= Wonjun Lee =

Korean professor of cybersecurity

- 이원준
- Born: Seoul, Republic of Korea
- Education: Seoul National University University of Maryland, College Park University of Minnesota
- Scientific career
- Workplaces: Korea University; Gachon University
- Thesis: Quality-of-Service Provisioning for Multimedia Applications
- Doctoral advisor: Jaideep Srivastava

Korean name
- Hangul: 이원준
- RR: I Wonjun
- MR: I Wŏnjun
- Website: https://netlab.korea.ac.kr/wlee https://netlab.gachon.ac.kr/professors/wlee

Wonjun Lee (Korean: 이원준) is a Distinguished Professor of Department of AI, College of IT Convergence, Gachon University, Seongnam, Republic of Korea, since 2025, and was a professor of Department of Cyber Defense, School of Cybersecurity at Korea University in Seoul, South Korea, in 2002-2025. His research interests include communication and network protocols, wireless communication and networking optimization techniques, security and privacy in mobile computing, and RF-powered computing and networking. He has authored 15 international patents, over 250 papers in refereed international journals and conferences, and a book “Optimal Coverage in Wireless Sensor Networks,” Springer, 2020 (with. Prof. D.-Z. Du).

Lee has served on program and organization committees of numerous leading wireless and networking conferences, including IEEE INFOCOM from 2008 to 2025, General Chair of IEEE ICDCS 2026, PC Track Chair of IEEE ICDCS 2019, Workshop Chair of IEEE ICDCS 2023, ACM MobiHoc from 2008 to 2009, and over 148 international conferences. He is also currently serving as a Division Editor of Wireless Communications Division of IEEE/KICS Journal of Communications and Networks (JCN), an editor of Elsevier High-Confidence Computing Journal (HCC), and Publication Board Chair of the Korean Institute of Information Scientists and Engineers (KIISE) Journal of Computing Science and Engineering (JSCE).

Lee has received numerous awards, including IEEE Chester W. Sall Memorial Award (2018), KIISE Gaheon Research Award (2011), LG Yonam Foundation Overseas Faculty Member Award (2007), Best Teaching Award (2005, 2009, 2021) from Korea University, and the Best Paper Awards from IEEE ICOIN 2002, ICOIN 2008, ICOIN 2023, and IEEE SocialCom 2016. In 2019, his project "BackPlugged: Wearable-optimized Ultra Low-Power Wi-Fi Networking with Plugged-in Backscatter Radio" was selected for 100 Outstanding National R&D Achievements by the Ministry of Science and ICT (MSIT) in the Republic of Korea. He was a recipient of the Korean Government Overseas Scholarship from the Ministry of Education in the Republic of Korea between 1993 and 1996.

In 2022, he became the 2022 President-Elect (2023 President) of KIISE. He is a Fellow of the Institute of Electrical and Electronics Engineers (IEEE) in 2021 for contributions to multiple access and resource allocation in wireless networks, a Fellow of the Korean Academy of Science and Technology (KAST) in 2022, and a member of the National Academy of Engineering of Korea (NAEK) in 2020.

== Education ==
Lee received his B.S. and M.S. degrees in computer engineering from Seoul National University (SNU), Seoul, Republic of Korea, in 1989 and 1991, respectively, his M.S. degree in computer science from the University of Maryland, College Park, MD, United States, in 1996, and his Ph.D. degree in computer science and engineering from the University of Minnesota, Minneapolis, MN, USA, in 1999.

== Awards ==
- 2023: Best Paper Award, International Conference on Information Networking (ICOIN-2023)
- 2022, 2020, 2016: Distinguished TPC Member Award, IEEE INFOCOM
- 2021: 1st award of Top Scientists Ranking for Engineering and Technology by Research
- 2020: IEEE Fellow "for contributions to multiple access and resource allocation in wireless networks"
- 2019: Excellence of National R&D Top 100, Korean government
- 2018: Chester W. Sall Memorial Award, IEEE
- 2016: Best Paper Award in the 9th IEEE International Conference on Social Computing and Networking, IEEE SocialCom-2016
- 2015: Best Paper Runner-up Award in the 2nd International Conference on Big Data and Smart Computing, (BigComp2015)
- 2011: Gaheon Academic Award, Korean Institute of Information Scientists and Engineers (KIISE)
- 2008: Best Paper Award, 22nd International Conference on Information Networking (ICOIN-2008)
- 2007: Overseas Faculty Member Award, LG Yonam Foundation
- 2003: Best Paper Award, International Conference on Information Networking (ICOIN-2003)
