= L'Oréal Korea-UNESCO for Women in Science Award =

Academic award of South Korea

L’Oréal Korea-UNESCO for Women in Science Award
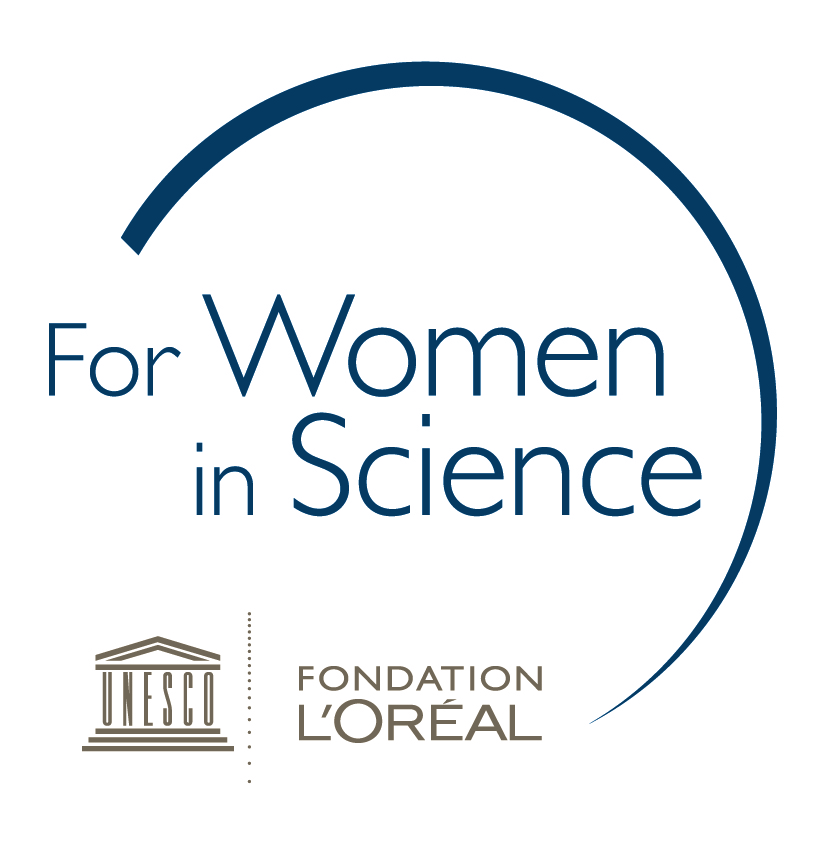
- L’Oréal Korea-UNESCO for Women in Science Award
- Country: South Korea
- Presented by: L'Oréal Korea, Korean National Commission for UNESCO (유네스코 한국위원회), and Women’s Bioscience Forum (여성생명과학기술포럼)
- First award: 2002; 24 years ago
- Website: L’Oréal Korea-UNESCO for Women in Science Award

- L'Oréal Korea-UNESCO for Women in Science Award
- Hangul: 한국 로레알-유네스코 여성과학자상
- Hanja: 韓國로레알-유네스코女性科學者賞
- Revised Romanization: Hanguk Roreal-Yuneseuko Yeoseong Gwahakja Sang
- McCune–Reischauer: Han'guk Roreal-Yunesŭk'o Yŏsŏng Kwahakcha Sang

The L’Oréal Korea-UNESCO for Women in Science Award (Korean: 한국 로레알-유네스코 여성과학자상) is a national level award as part of the L'Oréal-UNESCO For Women in Science Awards. It is said to be Korea's most prestigious female scientist award. The award is presented by L'Oréal Korea, Korean National Commission for UNESCO (ko), and Women’s Bioscience Forum (ko). Every year one academic promotion award is presented and up to four fellowships to young scientists under the age of 44 are granted. Endowment is KRW 20 million for the award and KRW 5 million for the young scientists. The award was founded in 2002 and underwent name changes in 2004 and 2017.

== Laureates ==
Year	Grand Prize	Young Scientist Award	Achievement Award
2002	Roe Jung-hye (노정혜) Seoul National University	Baek Jahyeon (백자현) Yonsei University	Oh Sehwa (오세화) Korea Research Institute of Chemical Technology Kim Young-hwan (김영환) National Assembly
2003	Kim Yeongjung (김영중) Seoul National University	Kim Honghui (김홍희) Seoul National University	Yu Gyeongja (유경자) Yonsei University Han Hyeongho (한형호) Ministry of Science and Technology
Year	Academic Achievement Award	Breakthrough Award	Achievement Award
2004	Na Doseon (나도선) University of Ulsan	Inhee Mook-Jung (묵인희) Seoul National University Mun Aeri (문애리) Duksung Women's University	Han Munhui (한문희) Proteogen Kim Sukhui (김숙희) Korea Food Research Institute (한국식품연구원)
2005	Lee Yeonhui (이연희) Seoul Women's University	Kim Yeongmi (김영미) University of Ulsan Baek Sung-hee (백성희) Seoul National University	Bak Giyeong (박기영) Presidential Information Science and Technology Adviser

Year	Academic Achievement Award	Fellowship
2006	Baek Gyeonghui (백경희) Korea University	Kim Juyang (김주양) University of Ulsan Bak Jihye (박지혜) KAIST Song Eunju (송은주) Korea Institute of Science and Technology
2007	Lee Hong Kum (이홍금) Korea Polar Research Institute	Kim Jeonghwa (김정화) Seoul National University Jang Hohui (장호희) Gyeongsang National University Ha Eunmi (하은미) Ewha Womans University
2008	Lee Yeongsuk (이영숙) Pohang University of Science and Technology	Kim Jiwon (김지원) Catholic University of Korea Jeong Hyeonja (정현자) Hoseo University Jo Gyeongok (조경옥) Catholic University of Korea
2009	Bae Hyeonsuk (배현숙) Yonsei University	Lee Yunjin (이윤진) Korea Institute of Radiological Medical Sciences (한국원자력의학원) Lee Jina (이진아) Hannam University U Juyeon (우주연) KAIST
2010	Kim Seung-hee (김승희) National Institute of Food and Drug Safety Evaluation (한국원자력의학원)	Seo Wonhui (서원희) Cha University Lee Nagyeong (이나경) Soonchunhyang University Hwang Eunsuk (황은숙) Ewha Womans University
2011	Baek Sung-hee (백성희) Seoul National University	Bak Boyeon (박보연) Yonsei University U Hyeonae (우현애) Ewha Womans University Jo Gyeonga (조경아) Chonnam National University
2012	Lee Kong-joo (이공주) Ewha Womans University	Kim Jaeun (김자은) Kyung Hee University Song Miryeong (송미령) Gwangju Institute of Science and Technology Jeong Chorok (정초록) Korea Research Institute of Bioscience and Biotechnology
2013	Yu Yeongsuk (유영숙) Korea Institute of Science and Technology	Mok Hyejeong (목혜정) Konkuk University Lee Sewon (이세원) Seoul National University Hospital Lee Seunghui (이승희) Seoul National University
2014	Jeong Seonju (정선주) Dankook University	Min Dalhui (민달희) Seoul National University Kim Hyeyeong (김혜영) Seoul National University Sim Jiwon (심지원) Hanyang University
2015	Mun Aeri (문애리) Duksung Women's University	Mun Jaehui (문재희) Asan Medical Center Yu Seunga (유승아) Catholic University of Korea Lee Hyemi (이혜미) Chungnam National University
2016	Inhee Mook-Jung (묵인희) Seoul National University	Kim Hyeongyeong (김현경) Seoul National University Lee Jeongmin (이정민) KAIST Yu Namgyeong (유남경) Seoul National University
2017	Son Yeongsuk (손영숙) Kyung Hee University	Bak Hyeonji (박현지) Yonsei University Bak Jinsil (박진실) Catholic University of Korea Lee Samin (이사민) University of Ulsan
2018	Lee Hoyeong (이호영) Seoul National University	Lee Yuri (이유리) Institute for Basic Science Lee Gyeonga (이경아) Seoul National University Sin Migyeong (신미경) KAIST
2019	Lee Miok (이미옥) Seoul National University	Kim Pilnam (김필남) Korea Research Institute of Chemical Technology Lee Suhyeon (이수현) Korea Research Institute of Chemical Technology Jeong Hyeonjeong (정현정) Korea Research Institute of Chemical Technology Jin Yunhui (진윤희) Yonsei University
2020	Jo Eungyeong (조은경) Chungnam National University	Choe Soyeong (최소영) Korea Research Institute of Chemical Technology Im Seonmin (임선민) Yonsei University Kim Jihye (김지혜) Asan Medical Center Kang Jeonga (강정아) Korea Research Institute of Bioscience and Biotechnology
2021	Lee Yumi (이유미) Kyungpook National University	Kim Boram (김보람) KAIST Bak Minhui (박민희) Kyungpook National University Kang Danbi (강단비) Sungkyunkwan University Lee Hyojeong (이효정) National Institute for Mathematical Sciences
2022	Kim Honghui (김홍희) Seoul National University	Kim Eunji (김은지) Seoul National University Yeo Jina (여진아) Korea Disease Control and Prevention Agency Lee Seonyeong (이선영) Severance Hospital
2023	Bak Hyeonseong (박현성) University of Seoul	Bak Hanseul (박한슬) Chungbuk National University Yun Ina (윤이나) Pharmaceutical BioConvergence Research Group Kim Jayeong (김자영) Yonsei University Kim Mingyeong (김민경) Kyungpook National University
2024	Kim Yuseon (김유선) Ajou University	Bak Hyojeong (박효정) Asan Medical Center Lee Eunjeong (이은정) Yonsei University Lee Chanbin (이찬빈) Pusan National University Bak Sohyeon (박소현) University of Seoul
2025	Im Mi-hee (임미희) KAIST	Kang Mi-kyung (강미경) Korea University Jeon Ji-hye (전지혜 ) Gyeongsang National University Jo Yu-na (조유나 Pusan National University Lee Jeong-hyeon (이정현) Kongju National University

== See also ==
- Woman Scientist/Engineer of the Year Award
- Women in STEM fields
- Women in engineering
- Women in science
