= Roe Jung-hye =

South Korean biologist (born 1957)

- 노정혜
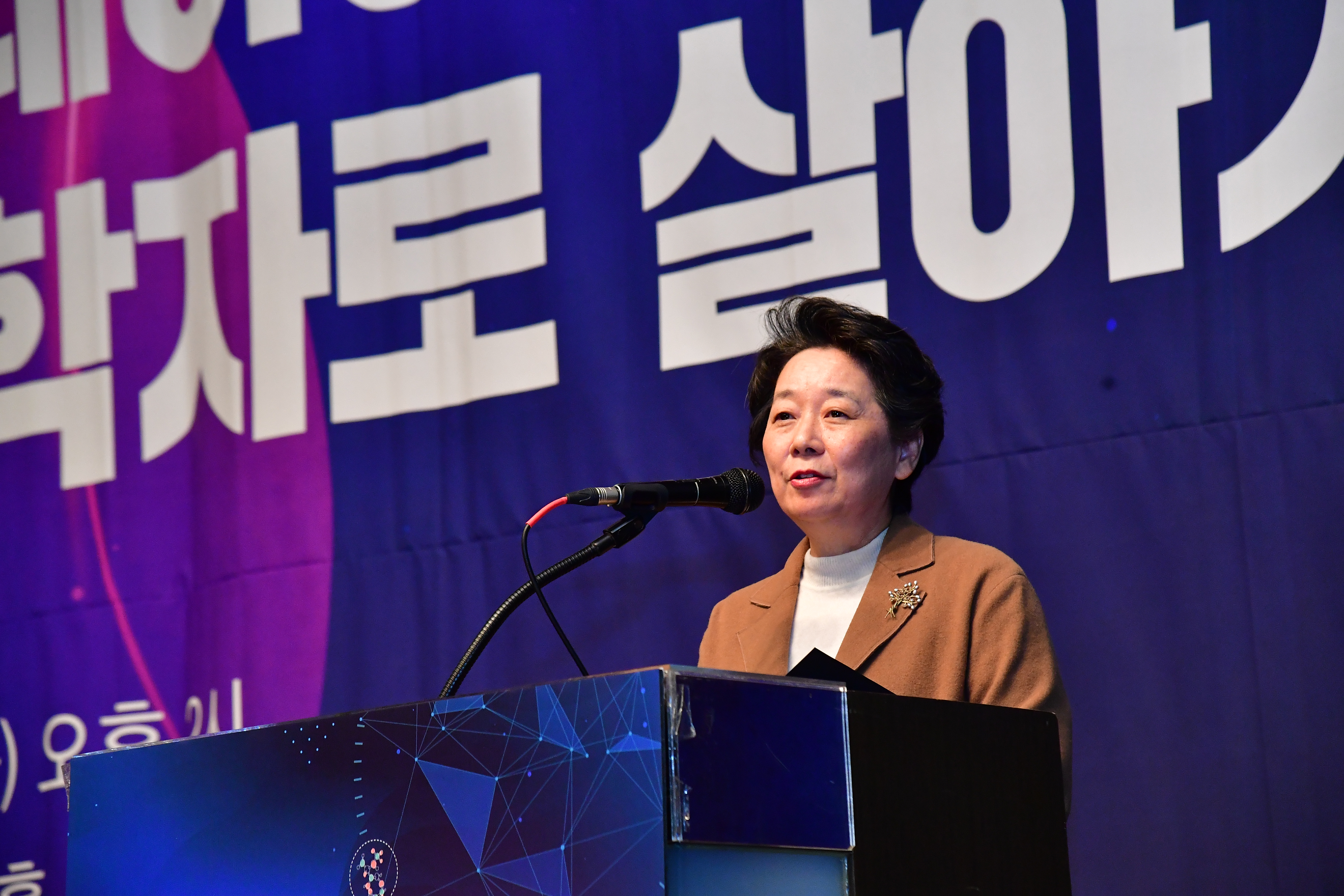

President of National Research Foundation of Korea
- In office 9 July 2018 – 31 August 2021
- Minister: Yoo Yeong-min; Choi Ki-young
- Preceded by: Cho Moo-jae
- Succeeded by: Lee Kwang-bok

Personal details
- Born: 1 March 1957 (age 69)
- Education: Seoul National University; University of Wisconsin-Madison
- Awards: Woman Scientist/Engineer of the Year Award

Roe Jung-hye (Korean: 노정혜; Hanja: 盧貞惠; born 1 March 1957) is a South Korean professor of Molecular biology at Seoul National University served as the 6th President of National Research Foundation of Korea - the first woman to lead the Foundation or its preceding foundations from 2018 to 2021.

From 1986 Roe has been teaching at her alma mater receiving full tenure in 1997. She undertook several roles in her university such as the Vice Dean of its College of Natural Sciences and Dean of Office of Research Affairs - the first woman to run the Office. She is also leading its School of Biological Sciences and BK21 programme for Biological Sciences from 2009. Roe has been active in academia as well serving as a member of editorial board of Microbiology from 2007 to 2011, Journal of Bacteriology from 2012 to 2015 and Annual Review of Microbiology from 2012 to 2017.

In addition to academia, Roe has been active in policy making and advisory instruments of the government. Roe was a board member of now-National Research Council of Science & Technology from 2005 to 2008 and a member of Presidential Advisory Council on Science and Technology from 2008 to 2013 to which she has served as an advisor from 2013.

In 2021 Roe's presidency of the National Research Foundation of Korea came to an end making her the first person to complete the Foundation's fixed term of three years.

Roe is a member of Korean Academy of Science and Technology and a fellow of American Academy of Microbiology.

Roe holds two degrees - a bachelor in Microbiology from Seoul National University and a doctorate in Molecular biology from University of Wisconsin–Madison.

== Awards ==
- 2002: L’Oréal Korea-UNESCO for Women in Science Award, UNESCO Korea and L'Oréal Korea
- 2006: Woman Scientist/Engineer of the Year Award, Ministry of Science and ICT
- 2011: Korea Science Award
