= Kim Sung-hoon (biologist) =

South Korean biologist

Sunghoon Kim
- Born: 1958 (age 67–68); South Korea
- Education: Ph.D. Brown University, U.S.
- Known for: Aminoacyl-tRNA Synthetases
- Awards: Korea Science Award, Ministry of Science and Technology (2003); Scientist of the Month, Korea Science and Engineering Foundation (KOSEF) (2003); Top Scientist and Technologist Award of Korea, Ministry of Science and Technology (2006); Award of Korean National Academy of Science (2012)
- Scientific career
- Fields: Aminoacyl-tRNA synthetase, Translation, Cancer biology, Therapeutic target discovery
- Workplaces: Seoul National University
- Doctoral advisor: Dr. Arthur Landy

Korean name
- Hangul: 김성훈
- RR: Gim Seonghun
- MR: Kim Sŏnghun

Dr. Kim Sunghoon is a South Korean biologist.

== Education ==
- 1981 B.S. Seoul National University
- 1983 M.S. Korea Advanced Institute of Science and Technology
- 1991 Ph.D. Brown University, U.S.

== Work ==
Sunghoon Kim has been studying novel functions of human aminoacyl-tRNA synthetases (ARSs) and searching for their pathophysiological connections to human diseases (PNAS 105:11043, 2008; Nat Rev Cancer 11:708, 2011). He has identified potent novel tumor suppressors such as AIMP2/p38 (Nat Genet 34:330, 2003), AIMP3/p18 (Cell, 120:209, 2005). Besides, he has also investigated novel extracellular activities of ARSs and associated factors such as lysyl-tRNA synthetase (KRS) (PNAS 102, 6356, 2005), tryptophanyl-tRNA synthetase(WRS)(Nat Struct Mol Biol 11:149, 2004) and AIMP1/p43 (PNAS 103:14913, 2006). He also discovered the oncogenic variant of AIMP2, designated AIMP2-DX2, as one of the critical factors that determines the survival of lung cancer patients (Plos Genet 7:e1001351, 2011). More recently, he found that leucyl-tRNA synthetase (LRS) serves as an amino acid sensor for mTOR signal pathway (Cell 149:410, 2012).

- 1991 – 1994: Post-doc, MIT
- 1994 – 2001: Associate Professor, Sung Kyun Kwan University
- 2001 – present: Professor, Seoul National University
- 1988 – 2007: Director, Center for ARS Network National Creative Research Initiatives
- 2007 – 2010: Director, Center for Medicinal Protein Network and Systems Biology
- 2010 – present: Director, Medicinal Bioconvergence Research Center

== Awards ==
- 2000: Donghun Award, Korean Society for Biochemistry and Molecular Biology
- 2003: Korea Science Award, Ministry of Science and Technology
- 2003: Scientist of the Month, Ministry of Science and ICT and National Research Foundation of Korea
- 2006: Top Scientist and Technologist Award of Korea, Ministry of Science and Technology
- 2012: Award of Korean National Academy of Science
- 2015: Ho-am Prize in Medicine, Ho-Am Foundation

== See also ==
- AwardsAminoacyl tRNA synthetase
- Leucyl-tRNA synthetase
