= List of presidents of the Korean Institute of Information Scientists and Engineers =

List of presidents of Korean Institute of Information Scientists and Engineers

The following is a list of all presidents of the Korean Institute of Information Scientists and Engineers from its founding in 1973.

No.	Name	Hangul name	Term
1	Han Sang-jun	한상준	1973–1974
2	Seo Nam-won	서남원	1975–1976
3	Song Gil-young	송길영	1977–1978
4	Park Gyu-tae	박규태	1979–1980
5	Kim Young-taek	김영택	1981–1982
6	Jo Jeong-wan	조정완	1983–1984
7	Kim Gil-chang	김길창	1985–1986
8	Kim Jong-sang	김종상	1987–1988
9	Lee Cheol-hee	이철희	1989–1990
10	Kim Ha-jin	김하진	1991–1992
11	Park Chan-mo	박찬모	1993
12	Lee Seok-ho	이석호	1994
13	Hwang Jong-seon	황종선	1995
14	Kim Young-chan	김영찬	1996
15	Jwa Gyeong-ryong	좌경룡	1997–1998
16	Lee Kyung-hwan	이경환	1999–2000
17	Cho Yu-geun	조유근	2001–2002
18	Kwon Yong-rae	권용래	2003
19	Park Yong-jin	박용진	2004
20	Kim Jin-hyung	김진형	2005
21	Kim Dong-yoon	김동윤	2006
22	Hwang Gyu-young	황규영	2007
23	Choi Yang-hee	최양희	2008
24	Kim Seong-jo	김성조	2009
25	Hong Jin-pyo	홍진표	2010
26	Lee Yoon-jun	이윤준	2011
27	Kim Myung-jun	김명준	2012
28	Seo Jeong-yeon	서정연	2013
29	Kim Jong-kwon	김종권	2014
30	Kim Ji-in	김지인	2015
31	Hong Chung-seon	홍충선	2016
32	Hong Bong-hee	홍봉희	2017
33	Eom Young-ik	엄영익	2018
34	Choi Jong-won	최종원	2019
35	Kim Du-hyeon	김두현	2020
36	Na Yeon-muk	나연묵	2021
37	Shim Gyu-seok	심규석	2022
38	Lee Won-jun	이원준	2023
39	Won Yu-jib	원유집	2024
40	Shin Byeong-seok	신병석	2025
41	Moon Sue	문수복	2026–current

== See also ==
- You Young-min
