= STEM Women of the Year =

Academic award of South Korea

- Awarded for: Excellence in science and engineering
- Country: South Korea
- Presented by: Korea Foundation for Women In Science, Engineering and Technology; Ministry of Science and ICT
- First award: 2001
- Website: www.wiset.or.kr/eng/sub03_04_01.do

The STEM Women of the Year (Korean: 올해의 여성과학기술인상) is a South Korean award presented to women scientists and engineers to promote leadership of women in STEM. It was established in 2001 by Korea Foundation for Women In Science, Engineering and Technology and Ministry of Science and ICT. Each year three winners are selected, one in each category (promotion, academy and industry; science, engineering and promotion previously). Laureates are given KRW 10 million and a prize by the Ministry of Science and ICT.

== Laureates ==
=== 2001–2016 ===
Year	Science	Engineering	Promotion
2001	Baek Myeonghyeon (백명현) Seoul National University	Kim Eungyeong (김은경) Korea Research Institute of Chemical Technology	Lee Giho (이기호) Ewha Womans University
2002	Kim Yeongjung (김영중) Seoul National University	Choe Sunja (최순자) Inha University	Oh Sehwa (오세화) Korea Research Institute of Chemical Technology
2003	Lee Yeongsuk (이영숙) Pohang University of Science and Technology	Kim Miseon (김미선) Korea Institute of Energy Research	Lee Heisook (이혜숙) Ewha Womans University
2004	Seo Eungyeong (서은경) Jeonbuk National University	Lee Hyosuk (이효숙) Korea Institute of Geoscience and Mineral Resources	Na Doseon (나도선) University of Ulsan
2005	Choie YoungJu (최영주) Pohang University of Science and Technology	Ju Osim (주오심) Korea Institute of Science and Technology	Lee Kong-joo (이공주) Ewha Womans University
2006	Bak Jeonghui (박정희) Korea University	Ahn Jihwan (안지환) Korea Institute of Geoscience and Mineral Resources	Roe Jung-hye (노정혜) Seoul National University
2007	Kim V. Narry (김빛내리) Seoul National University	Son Soyeong (손소영) Yonsei University	Chung Heesun (정희선) National Forensic Service (국립과학수사연구원)
2008	Kang Hyeseong (강혜성) Pusan National University	Ha Jeongsuk (하정숙) Korea University	Chung Kwang Hwa (정광화) Korea Research Institute of Standards and Science
2009	Hahn Okhui (한옥희) Korea Basic Science Institute	Ahn Jeongheon (안정헌) LG Chem	Jeong Myeong-hui (정명희) Korea Research Institute of Chemical Technology
2010	Kim Seongeun (김성은) Sejong University	Shin Yonghyeon (신용현) Korea Research Institute of Standards and Science	Kim Jiyeong (김지영) Kyung Hee University
2011	Kang Jeongsu (강정수) Catholic University of Korea	–	Lee Yeonhui (이연희) Seoul Women's University
2012	Baek Sung-hee (백성희) Seoul National University	Lee Rena (이레나) Ewha Womans University	Won Misuk (원미숙) Korea Basic Science Institute
2013	Lee Jeonghun (이정훈) Seoul National University	Son Jiwon (손지원) Korea Basic Science Institute	Jeon Gilja (전길자) Ewha Womans University
2014	Ham Sihyeon (함시현) Sookmyung Women's University	Lim Hyesook (임혜숙) Ewha Womans University	Yu Hyangsuk (유향숙) Korea Research Institute of Bioscience and Biotechnology
2015	Kim Seongyeon (김성연) Korea Institute for Advanced Study	Park Moon J. (박문정) Pohang University of Science and Technology	Lee Hong Kum (이홍금) Korea Polar Research Institute
2016	Kim Jeongseon (김정선) National Cancer Center (국립암센터)	Choe Jinhui (최진희) University of Seoul	Lee Hyang-sook (이향숙) Ewha Womans University

=== 2017–current ===
Year	Promotion	Academic	Industry
2017	Hahn Seongok (한성옥) Korea Institute of Energy Research (한국에너지기술연구원)	Lee Yunjeong (이윤정) Hanyang University	Son Miwon (손미원) ViroMed
2018	Bak Bokhui (박복희) Mokpo National University	Kim Myeongok (김명옥) Gyeongsang National University	Kim Jeongyeo (김정여) Electronics and Telecommunications Research Institute
2019	Kim Yeongmi (김영미) Kyung Hee University	Kim Miyeong (김미영) Seoul National University	Lee Geumju (이금주) Samsung Electronics
2020	Lee Myeongseon (이명선) Cheongju University	Bak Seonghui (박성희) KAIST	Jang Yeongrae (장영래) LG Chem
2021	Mun Aeri (문애리) Duksung Women's University	Lim Mi Hee (임미희) KAIST	Kim Mijin (김미진) Korea Institute of Energy Research
2022	Im Seokhui (임석희) Korea Aerospace Research Institute	Choe Huijeong (최희정) Seoul National University	Jo Eunjeon (조은전) Kolon Industries
2023	Ahn Buyeong (안부영) Korea Institute of Science and Technology Information	Kong Suhyeon (공수현) Korea University	Kim Huijeong (김희정) Samsung Heavy Industries
2024	Ju Seong-jin (주성진) Agency for Defense Development	Shin Hyeon-Jin (신현진) Gwangju Institute of Science and Technology	Yun Hu-suk (윤희숙) Korea Institute of Materials Science (한국재료연구원)
2025	Hong Surin (홍수린) Cha University	Shin Ju Young (신주영) Sungkyunkwan University	Lee Hyun-Ju (이현주) Korea Institute of Science and Technology

== See also ==
- L’Oréal Korea-UNESCO for Women in Science Award
- Women in STEM fields
