= Kim Eun-kyung =

Kim Eun-kyung or Kim Eun-kyeong, both Romanizations of 김은경, may refer to:

- Kim Eun-kyeong (born 1991), handball player
- Kim Eun-kyung (politician) (born 1956), former environment minister
- Kim Eun-kyung (commercial law professor) (born 1965), professor of commercial law
- Kim Eunkyoung, materials chemist at Yonsei University

== See also ==
- Kim Kyoung-eun (born 1998), freestyle skier
