= Inhee Mook-Jung =

South Korean scientist (born 1963)

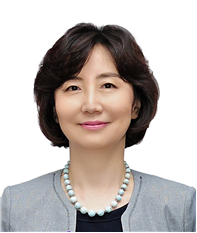
Inhee Mook-Jung in 2020

Inhee Mook-Jung (Korean: 묵인희; born 1963) is a South Korean scientist who works at the Seoul National University School of Medicine.

== Education ==
After graduating from Seoul National University (1982–1986) with a Bachelor of Science Professor Inhee Mook-Jung received her PhD. in the University of Arizona from 1991 to 1995.

- 1982–1986: B.S., Seoul National University
- 1991–1995: Ph.D., University of Arizona, U.S.A.

== Career ==
Inhee Mook-Jung is a South Korean Neuroscientist. She works on Alzheimer's disease pathogenesis. Professor Mook drew attention in 2006 for discovery that ERK1/2 proteins were involved in the regulation of beta amyloid, a substance that causes dementia. She also identified the mechanism and physiological function of beta amyloid. In particular, she identified the relationship between RAGE, a transport protein that delivers beta-amyloid into the brain, and the pathogenesis of Alzheimer's disease, and based on this, she developed a system that can screen RAGE modulators.

She is leading the Alzlab (a research group on Alzheimer at Seoul National University College of Medicine) and since August 2020 she works as the Director of the Korea Dementia Research Center.

== Awards ==
For her research in a new diagnosis method and treatment for Alzheimer's disease she has received many awards. Most recently her achievements were awarded with the Innovation Medal of Science and Technology in 2023 and in 2020 she received both the 2020 the Korean Society of Molecular Cell Biology Female Life Scientist Award and the 1st Hanlimwon Physiological or Medicine Award.

- 2023: Order of Science and Technology Innovation Medal
- 2022: Seoul Medical University Award for Excellence in Research
- 2020: 1st Hallimwon Physiology or Medicine Award
- 2020: Korean Society of Molecular Cell Biology Female Life Scientist Award
- 2019: 2019 Science Press Award
- 2019: Donghun Award, Korean Society for Biochemistry and Molecular Biology
- 2016: Minister of Health and Welfare Commendation
- 2016: Academic Award, L'Oréal Korea-UNESCO for Women in Science Award
- 2013: Minister of Health and Welfare Commendation
- 2011: Minister of Education, Science and Technology Award
- 2011: 7th Macrogen Female Scientist Award
- 2004: Breakthrough Award, L'Oréal Korea-UNESCO for Women in Science Award
