= Klaus Hahn (cell biologist) =

American scientist and educator

- Citizenship: USA
- Occupations: Professor, University of North Carolina at Chapel Hill
- Awards: The Pearse Prize Fellow of the American Association for the Advancement of Science Ronald Thurman Distinguished Professor of Pharmacology

Academic background
- Education: University of Pennsylvania University of Virginia, Carnegie Mellon University, Scripps Research Institute

Academic work
- Discipline: Pharmacology, Cell Biology, Chemistry
- Website: http://hahnlab.com

Klaus Michael Hahn is an American scientist and educator, recognized for his work developing methods to study molecular behavior inside living cells, especially fluorescent biosensors, optogenetics and chemogenetics.

== Education and academic career ==
Hahn earned his B.S in biochemistry and philosophy from the University of Pennsylvania, and his Ph.D. in chemistry from the University of Virginia. After postdoctoral training at Carnegie Mellon University and the Scripps Research Institute, he became an associate professor at Scripps in the Cell Biology Department. He is currently the Ronald Thurman Distinguished Professor of Pharmacology at the University of North Carolina at Chapel Hill. He was co-founder of the Olympus Imaging Center at UNC, and served on advisory boards for the National Cancer Institute’s Frederick National Laboratory, national funding agencies, and NIH imaging centers.

== Awards and recognition ==
Hahn is a Fellow of the American Association for the Advancement of Science and was awarded a Transformative R01 Award and the James Shannon Director’s Award from the National Institutes of Health. Nature Reviews Molecular Cell Biology named his work on fluorescent biosensors one of the “ten breakthroughs of the decade”. In 2019 he was awarded the Pearse Prize of the Royal Microscopy Society.

Notable lectures: Pearse Prize Lecture, Royal Microscopy Society, 2019; ABRF national meeting, 2016; Leica Scientific Forum France 2012; Korean Society for Biochemistry and Molecular Biology 2010; International Conference of Systems Biology 2009; Annual Meeting of the Japanese Biochemical Society 2003

== Research ==
Hahn has spent his career in academic research and education. He initially developed fluorescent biosensors, molecules that report on control mechanisms within living cells. He and his colleagues pioneered early biosensor designs, including the use of fluorescence resonance energy transfer and environment-sensing dyes. His laboratory has extended biosensor imaging to study conformational changes of single molecules inside living cells. These studies revealed how localized, transient protein activation events, especially of small GTPases, generate cell movement.

More recently, the Hahn lab focused on precisely controlling specific cell components within cells and animals. They showed how proteins can be engineered to respond to light or small molecules, using a variety of generalizable techniques. This was especially valuable for the broad range of proteins that, unlike rhodopsins and channel proteins used earlier, had not evolved to respond to light. By inserting engineered domains into specific cell constituents, they and their collaborators elucidated mechanisms of memory, immune function, cell motility and others.
