= Young-Ki Paik =

South korean biochemist

Young-Ki Paik (Korean: 백영기) is the director of the Yonsei Proteome Research Center in Seoul, Korea. In 2009, he was chosen President of the Human Proteome Organization (HUPO).

== Education ==
Paik grew up in Daejon City and Gangkyung city (Choong-Nam Province, until 6 years old), and Seoul, Korea, son of the High School Teacher Nam-Cheol Paik and hospital nurse Bok-Im Yu. He went to Yonsei University where majored in Biochemistry. After graduating in 1975, he was appointed as an army ROTC officer with second lieutenant of Korean Army and served Interpretation officer at the Korean Army Ordnance School till July 1977. After completing his military duty, he had a research position at Agency for Defense Development (ADD), where he was involved in the development of a civil defense kit of oxime drug that protects action of the AChE–nerve agent adduct.

== Research and career ==
In the summer of 1979, he went to the Graduate School of the University of Missouri in Columbia, Missouri where he majored in biochemistry with cholesterol biosynthesis enzymes under Jame L Gaylor, and received his Ph.D. in August 1983. Most of his work was done at Du Pont Company, Glenolden, PA, where his advisor (Dr. James L Gylor) moved to Du Pont in 1981. In 1983, he then moved to Gladstone Institutes, University of California, San Francisco, CA and started his postdoc carrier with John Taylor on molecular cell biology of human apolipoprotein E gene which is involved in transportation of cellular cholesterol from peripheral tissues to liver. The outcome of his postdoctoral studies was the molecular characterization and transcriptional regulation of human ApoE gene (ε4), which was later found to be involved in the late onset of Alzheimer disease.

=== Pheromone discovery ===
After completion of doctoral and post-doc training for 10 years in the US, he came back to Korea to set up his own research carrier in sterol metabolism at Hanyang University and Yonsei University. Most of work has been done at Yonsei University where he carried out three arms of research, sterol metabolism, C. elegans pheromone, and cancer proteomics. While he works on the cholesterol metabolism at Yonsei University, his team was able to propose the 19 steps reaction pathway from lanosterol to cholesterol based on the position the sterol 24-reductase reaction which was cited by major BIOCHEMISTRY Textbooks (Voet and Voet). Later, he became very interested in C. elegans pheromone which was then not clearly identified yet. In 2005, he and his student, Pan-Young Jeong were able to identify dauer pheromone (now called ascaroside pheromone), an important substance for chemical communication, developmental process and aging in C. elegans life history, for the first time and published this discovery in Nature. His discovery of pheromone not only opens up the field of chemical biology of pheromone research in this model animal but also has made important strides in our understanding of animal physiology under stressful environment where pheromone plays multiple roles.

=== Proteomics research ===
While he works at the department of biochemistry, Yonsei University, he also became interested in proteomics, an emerging technology at that time. In 1999, Paik established Yonsei Proteome Research Center, a flagship proteome center in Asia where he has carried out research on the human proteome, aging and cancer proteomics (liver and pancreatic cancers). He contributed to development of international proteome societies, including Korean HUPO (KHUPO), AOHUPO and HUPO where he also served president. In 2012, Paik and his colleagues at HUPO organized the international consortium of Chromosome-Centric Human Proteome Project (C-HPP) which aims to identify, quantify, and localize expression of at least one representative protein from each of the ~20,000 predicted protein-coding genes in a chromosome-by-chromosome manner. The term 'Missing Proteins' was coined for the first time. During his term as chair of C-HPP consortium (2010-2018) which consists of 25 international teams, the C-HPP team laid out a long-term plan to characterize missingproteins and proteins of no known function (uPE1).

== Awards and honors ==
He received Kyung-Am Award, A Scientist of Month Award (Ministry of Science and Technology and Ministry of Health and Welfare), DI Awards, MSD Awards and HUPO Distinguished Service Award. He was Director of Natural Science Division of the Korean Academy of Science and Technology.

- 1996 - MSD Award, Korean Society for Lipidology
- 1999 - Donghun Award, Korean Society for Biochemistry and Molecular Biology
- 2004 - HUPO Distinguished Service Award, Human Proteome Organization
- 2005 - Scientist of the Month Awards, Ministry of Health & Welfare
- 2005 - Scientist of the Month Awards, Ministry of Science & Technology

== Publications ==
- A molecular basis for reciprocal regulation between pheromones and hormones in response to dietary cues in C. Elegans.
- A novel functional cross-interaction between opioid and pheromone signaling may be involved in stress avoidance in Caenorhabditis elegans.
- Identification of ALDH6A1 as a Potential Molecular Signature in Hepatocellular Carcinoma via Quantitative Profiling of the Mitochondrial Proteome.
- Potential Regulatory Role of Human-Carboxylesterase-1 Glycosylation in Liver Cancer Cell Growth.
