= Lee Hyang-sook =

South Korean mathematician (born 1963)

- 이향숙
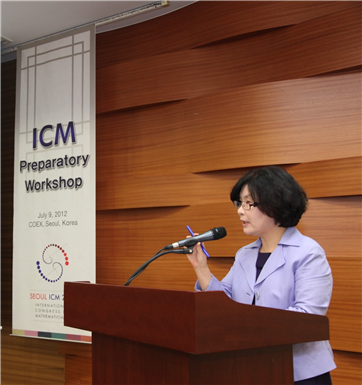
- Born: 1963 (age 62–63)
- Education: Ewha Womans University (BS, MS); Northwestern University (PhD)
- Awards: Seoul City Cultural Award, Woman Scientist/Engineer of the Year Award
- Scientific career
- Fields: Mathematics, cryptography
- Workplaces: Ewha Womans University
- Thesis: The Stable and Unstable Types of Classifying Spaces and Invariant Theory (1993)
- Doctoral advisor: Stewart Beauregard Priddy

Korean name
- Hangul: 이향숙
- RR: I Hyangsuk
- MR: I Hyangsuk
- Website: Hyang-Sook Lee Homepage

Lee Hyang-sook (Korean: 이향숙; born 1963) is a professor of mathematics and the 18th president of Ewha Womans University with a planned four years in the position of president. She was also the first female president of the Korean Mathematical Society.

== Education ==
Lee majored in mathematics graduating from Ewha Womans University with a B.S. and M.S. and then Northwestern University with a Ph.D.

== Career ==
After graduation, Lee returned to Ewha teaching and conducting research and in the Department of Mathematics. In addition to her teaching responsibilities, she has held various other positions at Ewha; including president of the Graduate School Alumnae Association, director of both the Institute of Mathematical Science and Center for Entrepreneurship, CEO of Technology Holdings, vice president of research, and the 18th president. Inaugurated on February 1, 2025, Lee is the first president of Ewha Womans University from a science and engineering background. In March 2026, Lee announced that Ewha would be launching 55 new courses in artificial intelligence to support women interested in the field. She is also credited with the foundation of Ewha's Institute of Multiscale Materials and Systems (IMMS), which will invest 10 million won into interdisciplinary research in energy and intelligence over the next 10 years.

Outside of Ewha, she has been a board member of the Basic Science Academic Council (기초과학학회협의체), Institute for Basic Science, National Research Foundation of Korea, National Research Council of Science & Technology, Basic Research Advisory Committee of the National Science and Technology Advisory Council, Korea Federation of Women's Science & Technology Association, and the Association of Korean Woman Scientist and Engineers. She was also vice president of both the Korea Institute of Information Security & Cryptology (한국정보보호학회 부회장) and Volunteers for Educational Services in Asia, along with president of the Korean Mathematical Society and the Korean Association of Mathematical Societies (한국수학관련단체총연합회 회장). Lee is the first female president of the Korean Mathematical Society.

== Awards and honors ==
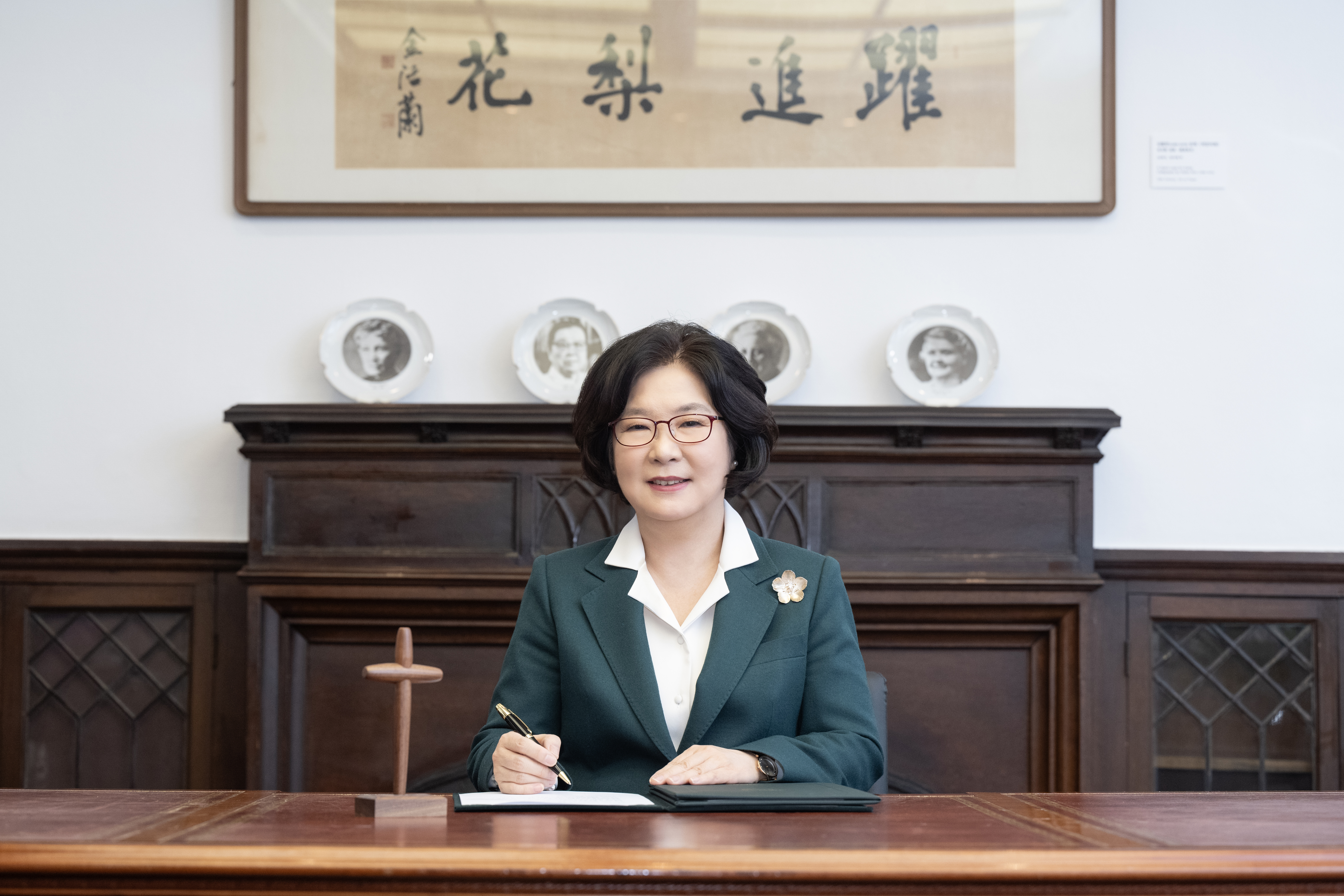
Lee Hyang-sook poses for a photo.

- 2023: Seoul City Cultural Award
- 2023: Distinguished Alumni Award, Mathematics Department, Ewha Womans University
- 2021: Service Award, Korean Mathematical Society
- 2020–2023: Research Excellence Award, Ewha Womans University
- 2016: Woman Scientist/Engineer of the Year Award, Korea Foundation for Women In Science, Engineering and Technology
- 2013–2016: Research Excellence Award, Ewha Womans University
- 2015: Special Service Award, Korean Mathematical Society

== Selected publications ==
1. Duursma, Iwan; Lee, Hyang-Sook (2003). Tate Pairing Implementation for Hyperelliptic Curves y^{2} = x^{p} - x + d. Springer Berlin Heidelberg. pp. 111–123. doi:10.1007/978-3-540-40061-5_7.
2. Lee, Eunjeong; Lee, Hyang-Sook; Park, Cheol-Min (April 2009). "Efficient and generalized pairing computation on abelian varieties". IEEE Transactions on Information Theory. 55 (4): 1793–1803. Bibcode:2009ITIT...55.1793L. doi:10.1109/TIT.2009.2013048.

== See also ==
- Kim Hei-sook
