= Park Sukyung =

South Korean mechanical engineer (born 1973)

- 박수경
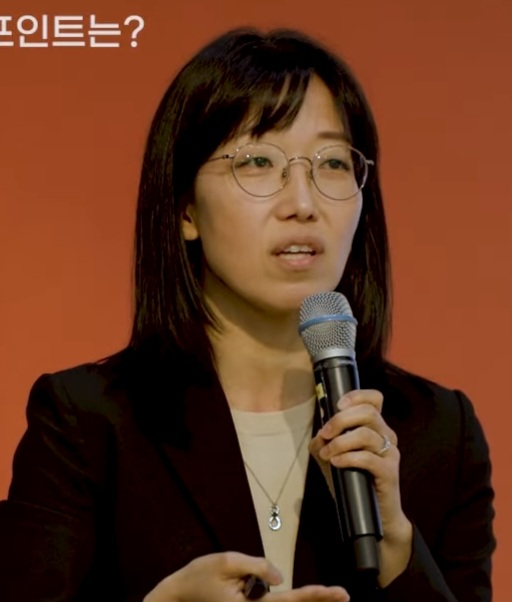

Advisor to the President for Science and Technology
- In office 4 May 2020 – 9 May 2022
- President: Moon Jae-in
- Preceded by: Lee Kong-joo
- Succeeded by: Cho Sung-kyung

Personal details
- Born: 1973 (age 52–53) Seoul, South Korea
- Education: KAIST; University of Michigan

Park Sukyung (Korean: 박수경; born 1973) is a South Korean professor of mechanical engineering at KAIST with expertise in Biomechanics served as Science and Technology Advisor to President Moon Jae-in from 2020 to 2022.

Park is the youngest person appointed by Moon to a vice-ministerial post as well as the youngest senior member of the Office of the President.

Park was the first female professor to join the faculty of mechanical engineering at KAIST and the first student to graduate from Seoul Science High School in only two years.

Park is a member of the KAIST board of trustees. She was previously a senior researcher at the government-funded Korea Institute of Machinery and Materials and a member of the President's Advisory Council on Science and Technology.

Park holds three degrees in mechanical engineering - a bachelor's and master's from KAIST and a doctorate from the University of Michigan.
