= Hollywood Presbyterian Medical Center =

CHA Hollywood Presbyterian Medical Center
- CHA Healthcare
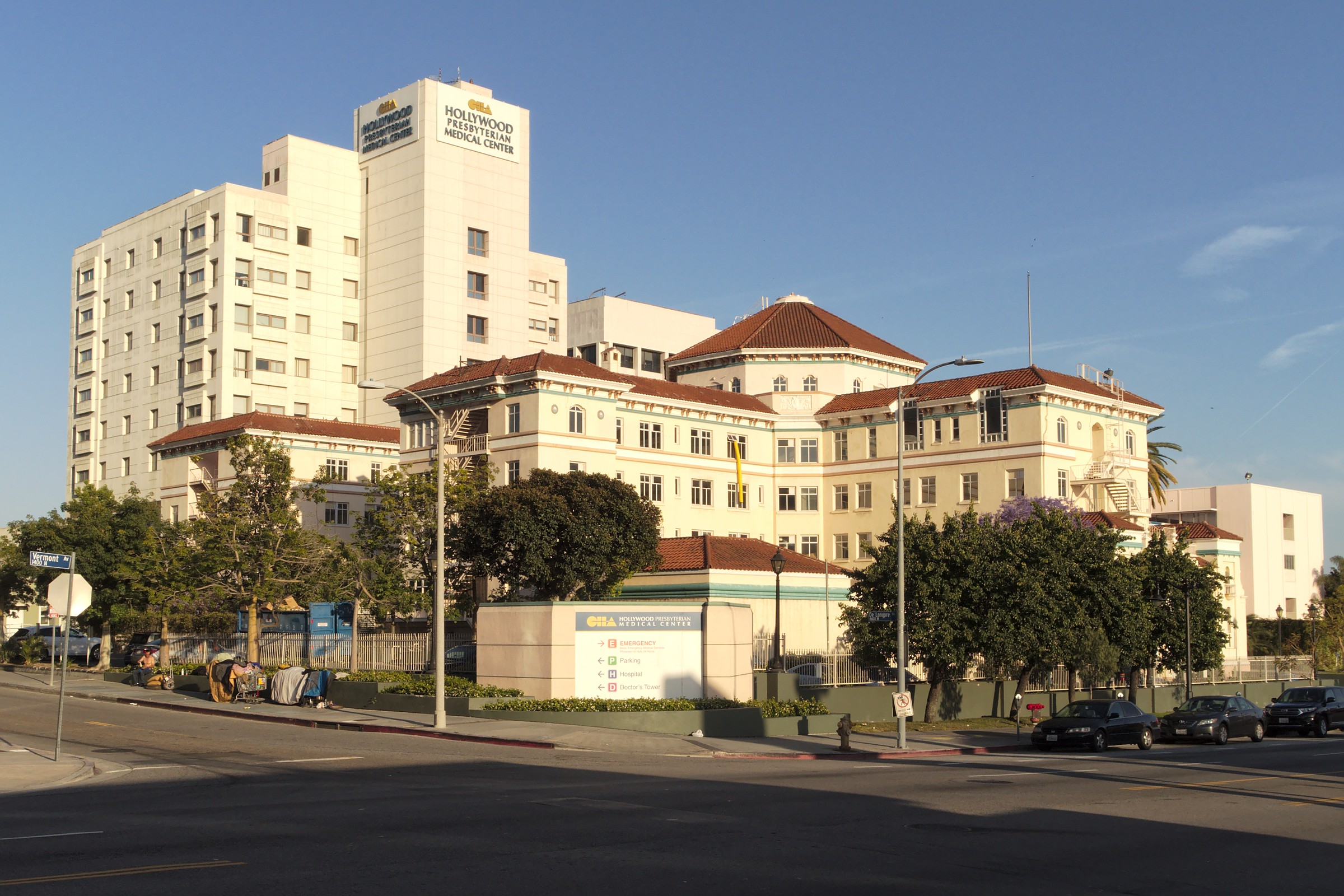

Geography
- Location: 1300 North Vermont Avenue, Los Angeles, California, United States
- Coordinates: 34°5′47″N 118°17′28″W

Organization
- Care system: Private
- Type: Teaching
- Affiliated university: Cha University

Services
- Beds: 434

History
- Opened: 1924

Links
- Website: HollywoodPresbyterian.com
- Lists: Hospitals in California

CHA Hollywood Presbyterian Medical Center, formerly known as Queen of Angels – Hollywood Presbyterian Medical Center, is a private hospital located at 1300 North Vermont Avenue in Los Angeles, California. The hospital has 434 beds and is owned by the South Korea-based CHA Medical Group.

== History ==
The hospital has been in business since 1924.

In 2004, HPMC joined the CHA Medical Group, which includes CHA Biotech Corporation, Cha University, and medical centers in Gangnam, Bundang, and Gumi. CHA renamed it CHA Hollywood Presbyterian Medical Center. CHA Hollywood Presbyterian Medical Center is the first Korean-owned and operated general hospital in the United States.

The hospital is an acute-care seven-building facility with 434 licensed beds, 1,400 employees, and an 800-member medical staff. It was the proving round for the new specialty of critical care medicine. Dr Weil was the founding president of the society for critical care medicine. He trained critical care specialist from every continent and published the first text book on the subject.

In 1989, the operations of Queen of Angels Hospital were merged with Hollywood Presbyterian Medical Center. The name of the hospital then became Queen of Angels – Hollywood Presbyterian Medical Center. The Queen of Angels building, a Spanish-style hospital complex, was mainly used as a movie set. The USC critical care fellowship program was centered here by Dr. Weil and Dr. Schubin. Two of the three fathers of the specialty. The shock research unit was the most sophisticated critical care units in the world. Dr Bectal was the first surgeon in the area to do total hip replacement after training in London.

== Improvement in ED services ==
Recently, there has been a major improvement in ED (Emergency Department) services for patients. It is divided into three tracks according to the severity of the symptoms to provide fast emergency services. This allows patients to receive shorter waiting times and immediate treatment.

=== Ten-Year Expansion and Modernization Master Plan ===
The master plan was designed to expand and modernize its facility and to fulfill the state's seismic safety mandate that all hospitals must meet by 2020.

There would be new emergency department. The new ED was planned to include increasing the current 20 beds to 26 beds and doubling the size of the department's physical space from its current 11,000 square feet (1,000 m^{2}) to 26,000 square feet (2,400 m^{2}). The emergency department is staffed by a trained, multilingual team of physicians, nurses and ancillary staff, providing a culturally sensitive resource for the community.

Also included in Phase 1 of the master plan is building a new 650-spot parking structure for patients, employees and visitors and beautifying overall internal and external designs of the hospital campus. The anticipated completion date was fall 2019.

== Controversies ==
=== "Patient dumping" ===
In February 2007, an investigation was launched after a hospital official allegedly "dumped" 54-year-old Gabino Olvera, a paraplegic patient, on a Skid Row street. According to witnesses, Olvera was removed from a hospital van and was left writhing in a gutter, wearing nothing more than a soiled gown and a broken colostomy bag. The hospital agreed to pay US$1,000,000 and be monitored for up to 5 years as part of a settlement agreement reached in 2008.

=== Ransomware ===
In 2016, the hospital's computer system was hijacked by ransomware forcing the hospital to use paper for more than a week. Patients were asked to pick up lab results in person. The hospital paid a 40 bitcoin ransom that was then worth approximately US$17,000 to the hackers to regain access to their system.

== In popular culture ==
Exterior scenes of the hospital was used for the 1979–1986 CBS medical drama series, Trapper John, M.D.
