= Experimental & Molecular Medicine =

- Discipline: Biochemistry, molecular biology
- Language: English
- Edited by: Dae-Myung Jue

Publication details
- Former name(s): Taehan Saenghwa Hakhoe Chapchi, Korean Journal of Biochemistry
- History: 1996-present
- Publisher: Nature Publishing Group
- Frequency: Monthly
- Open access: Yes
- Impact factor: 12.8 (2022)

Standard abbreviations
- ISO 4: Exp. Mol. Med.

Indexing
- CODEN: EMMEF3
- ISSN: 1226-3613 (print); 2092-6413 (web)
- OCLC no.: 38557732

Links
- Journal homepage; Online archive; 2008-present archive at PubMed Central

Experimental & Molecular Medicine is a monthly peer-reviewed open access medical journal covering biochemistry and molecular biology. It was established in 1964 as the Korean Journal of Biochemistry or Taehan Saenghwa Hakhoe Chapchi and published bi-annually. It was originally in Korean becoming an English-language journal in 1975. In 1994 the journal began publishing quarterly. It obtained its current name in 1996 at which time it also began publishing bi-monthly, switching to monthly in 2009. It is the official journal of the Korean Society for Biochemistry and Molecular Biology. The editor-in-chief is Dae-Myung Jue (Catholic University of Korea). It is published by the Nature Publishing Group. The full text of the journal from 2008 to the present is available at PubMed Central.

== Abstracting and indexing ==
The journal is abstracted and indexed in:

- BIOSIS Previews
- Chemical Abstracts
- Embase
- Index Medicus/MEDLINE/PubMed/PubMed Central
- Science Citation Index Expanded
- Scopus

According to the Journal Citation Reports, the journal had a 2022 impact factor of 12.8. In 2020, it ranked at the 14th out of 140 journals in the category "Medicine, Research & Experimental" and 34th out of 298 journals in the category "Biochemistry & Molecular Biology".
