= Lee Kong-joo =

South Korean emeritus professor

- 이공주

Advisor to the President for Science and Technology
- In office 19 February 2019 – 19 February 2020
- President: Moon Jae-in
- Preceded by: Mun Mi-ock
- Succeeded by: Park Sukyung

Personal details
- Born: 1955 (age 70–71)
- Education: Ewha Womans University; KAIST; Stanford University
- Awards: Woman Scientist/Engineer of the Year Award

- Lee Kong-joo
- Hangul: 이공주
- Hanja: 李公珠
- RR: I Gongju
- MR: I Kongju

Lee Kong-joo (Korean: 이공주; Hanja: 李公珠; born 1955) is a South Korean emeritus professor of pharmacy at Ewha Womans University previously served as President Moon Jae-in's Advisor for Science and Technology.

Lee is one of first generation female scientists who have been active in both pioneering research and representing scientists.

From 1994 Lee has been teaching at her alma mater, Ewha Womans University. In 2010 she became the dean of its graduate school. In 2007 she became a member of Korean Academy of Science and Technology. Lee was previously a member of editorial board of Molecular & Cellular Proteomics for five years.

Upon return from the United States, Lee started working as a senior researcher at Korea Research Institute of Standards and Science, one of science research institutes in Daedeok Innopolis from 1989 to 1994. After realising that there were only several female researchers among 200 researchers in the research cluster, she led the foundation of the Association of Woman Scientists and Engineers (KWSE). Moreover, Lee led KWSE as its vice president from 2004 and president from 2006 to 2007. She also chaired International Network of Women in Engineering and Sciences (INWES) from 2011 to 2017. She was also a member of National Science and Technology Commission from 2007 to 2009.

After serving as the advisor to President Moon for a year, she resigned from the post to return to academia. In August 2021 along with former foreign minister Kang Kyung-wha, Lee was appointed a distinguished professor emeritus of pharmacy at Ewha Womans University.

Lee holds three degrees - a bachelor in pharmacy from Ewha Womans University, a master's in bioengineering and a doctorate in Biophysical chemistry from Stanford University. She was awarded the L’Oréal Korea-UNESCO for Women in Science Award in 2012.
