= Heisook Lee =

South Korean mathematician (born 1948)

- Lee in 2018
- Born: 1948 (age 77–78)
- Occupation: Mathematician

Heisook Lee (Korean: 이혜숙, born 1948) is a South Korean mathematician and activist for gender equality in mathematics. She is retired as a professor of mathematics and dean at Ewha Womans University. Her mathematical research has concerned abstract algebra and algebraic coding theory, including work on self-dual codes and bent functions.

== Career ==
Lee graduated from Ewha Womans University in 1971. After a master's degree in 1974 from the University of British Columbia in Canada, she completed a Ph.D. in 1978 from Queen's University at Kingston, also in Canada. Her dissertation, The Brauer Group of an Integral Scheme, was supervised by Morris Orzech.

After postdoctoral research in Germany at the University of Regensburg, she returned to Ewha Womans University in 1980, as a professor of mathematics. She became dean of natural sciences and dean of research affairs from 1997 to 2001, and dean of graduate studies from 2006 to 2008.

Lee became founding editor of Communications of the Korean Mathematical Society in 1986. From 1994 to 1996, she was editor in chief of the Journal of the Korean Mathematical Society. She was the second president of the Korea Federation of Women's Science & Technology Associations (KOFWST), serving from 2006 to 2007. She founded the Center for Women in Science, Engineering, and Technology (WISET), now the Korean Foundation for Women in Science, Engineering, and Technology, and became its first president, serving from 2013 to 2016.

She is a professor emeritus at Ewha Womans University, and president of the Korea Center for Gendered Innovations (GISTeR).

== Award ==
- 2003 Woman Scientist/Engineer of the Year Award

== See also ==
- Korean Mathematical Society
