= Donghun Award =

Annual award in South Korea

- Country: South Korea
- Presented by: Korean Society for Biochemistry and Molecular Biology
- Rewards: Plaque and 20 million KRW
- First award: 2007
- Prizes given: 26 as of 2023
- Website: Awards page

- Donghun Award
- Hangul: 동헌생화학상
- Hanja: 東軒生化學賞
- RR: Dongheon saenghwahaksang
- MR: Tonghŏn saenghwahaksang

The Donghun Award (Korean: 동헌생화학상) is an annual award presented by the Korean Society for Biochemistry and Molecular Biology awarded to members who made creative research achievements in biochemistry and applied fields. The award was established in accordance with the wishes of Park Ki-Eok and first presented in 1998. Winners are selection by the Constitutional Committee and approval by the board of directors and is notified in April or May with the award ceremony taking place in May.

== Laureates ==
Year	Laureate	Institution
1998	Seo Sewon (서세원)	Seoul National University
1999	Paik Young-Ki (백융기)	Yonsei University
2000	Sung-hoon (김성훈)	Seoul National University
2001	Suh Pann-Ghill (서판길)	Pohang University of Science and Technology
2002	Ryu Seongho (류성호)	Pohang University of Science and Technology
2003	Kim Insan (김인산)	Kyungpook National University
2004	Hwang Woo-suk (황우석)	Seoul National University
2005	Bak Sangcheol (박상철)	Seoul National University
2006	Lee Bokryul (이복률)	Pusan National University
2007	Seo Jeongseon (서정선)	Seoul National University
2008	Kim Yeongmyeong (김영명)	Kangwon National University
2009	Kim Uhyeon (김우현)	Jeonbuk National University
2010	Choe Muyeong (최의주)	Korea University
2011	Lee Sanghun (이상훈)	Hanyang University
2012	Kaang Bong-Kiun (강봉균)	Seoul National University
2013	Lee Wonjae (이원재)	Seoul National University
2014	Kim Yeongjun (김영준)	Yonsei University
2015	Oh Byeongha (오병하)	KAIST
2016	Oh Gutaek (오구택)	Ewha Womans University
2017	Kim Myeonghui (김명희)	Korea Research Institute of Bioscience and Biotechnology
2018	Kwon Yeonggeun (권영근)	Yonsei University
2019	Inhee Mook-Jung (묵인희)	Seoul National University
2020	Muk Inhui (권호정)	Yonsei University
2021	Cho Hyeseong (조혜성)	Ajou University
2022	Lee Byeongheon (이병헌)	Kyungpook National University
2023	Lee Wontae (이원태)	Yonsei University
2024	Jo Eun-gyeong (조은경)	Chungnam National University
2025	Hwang Cheol-sang (황철상)	Korea University

== See also ==
- List of biology awards
- William C. Rose Award
- Otto Warburg Medal
