= Lim Hyesook =

South Korean electronics engineer

- 임혜숙
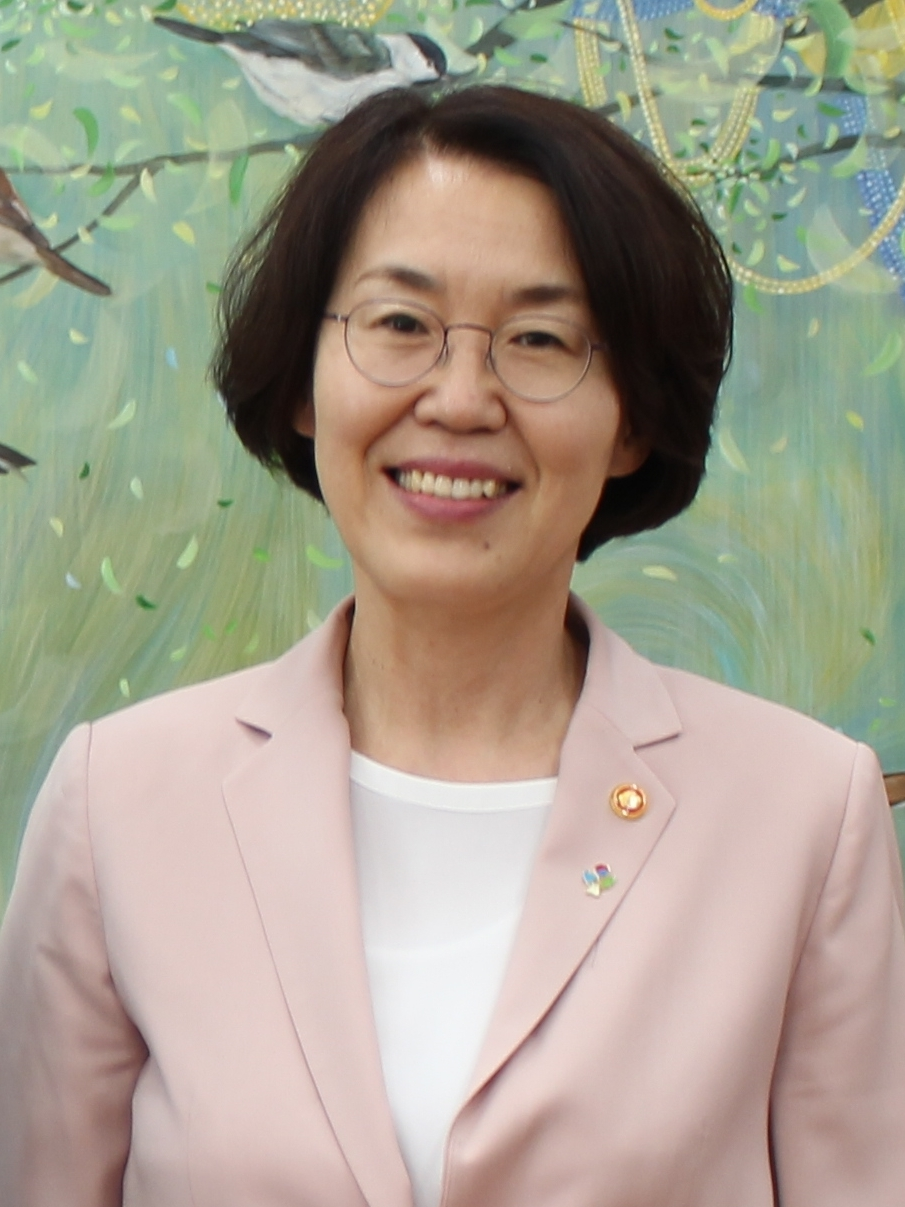

Minister of Science and ICT
- In office 14 May 2021 – 9 May 2022
- President: Moon Jae-in
- Prime Minister: Kim Boo-kyum
- Preceded by: Choi Ki-young
- Succeeded by: Lee Jong-ho

Chairperson of National Research Council of Science and Technology
- In office 19 January 2021 – 13 May 2021
- Preceded by: Wohn Kwangyun

Personal details
- Born: 1963 (age 62–63)
- Education: Seoul National University; University of Texas at Austin

Lim Hye-sook (Korean: 임혜숙; Hanja: 林惠淑; born 1963) is a South Korean electronics engineering professor at Ewha Womans University served as Minister of Science and ICT under President Moon Jae-in from 2021 to 2022. Lim was the first woman to lead the country's science ministry.

== Education ==
Lim earned her bachelor's and master's degrees in engineering from the Department of Control and Instrumentation at Seoul National University and a Ph.D. in Electrical and Computer Engineering from the University of Texas at Austin.

== Career ==
Before joining academia, Lim worked at Samsung-HP joint venture after finishing her undergraduate studies and Bell Labs and Cisco Systems after her doctorate studies.

Lim began her teaching career at Ewha Womans University in 2002 receiving full tenure in 2011. Lim took various roles at the university serving as the head of its Department of Electronics Engineering from 2005 to 2007, the associate dean of its School of Engineering from 2009 to 2011 and the dean of its College of Engineering from 2018 to 2020. Lim also sat as the Associate VP for academic affairs of the university from 2012 to 2014. In Moon's press conference shortly after his special address marking his fourth year in office, Moon explained the reason for her nomination that increasing women's workforce participation is one of prominent solutions in nurturing much-needed professionals in innovative economy sectors such as semiconductor, AI and digital economy and he expects Lim to set one of precedents for them.

In 2020, Lim was elected chair of the Institute of Electronics and Information Engineers - the first woman in its over-70-year history.

In May 2021, Lim signed the Artemis Accord on behalf of the Ministry and the government officially joining moon exploration project with nine other countries.

Lim was previously Moon's Chairperson of one of the Ministry's child agencies, the National Research Council of Science and Technology, which oversees 25 government-funded research institutes in the field such as Korea Institute of Science and Technology, Electronics and Telecommunications Research Institute and Korea Aerospace Research Institute. Lim was the youngest and the first woman to lead the council.

== Awards ==
- Science and Technology Medal by the government of South Korea (2020)
- Stars in Computer Networking and Communications by N2Women (2019)
- Woman Scientist/Engineer of the Year Award by then-Ministry of Science, ICT and Future Planning (2014)
- 2025 class of IEEE Fellows
