= Baek Sung-hee =

South Korean molecular geneticist (born 1970)

Sung Hee Baek
- 백성희
- Born: 1970 (age 55–56)
- Education: Seoul National University
- Known for: Genetic research
- Awards: Woman Scientist/Engineer of the Year Award, L’Oréal Korea-UNESCO for Women in Science Award

Korean name
- Hangul: 백성희
- RR: Baek Seonghui
- MR: Paek Sŏnghŭi
- Scientific career
- Fields: Molecular and cellular genetics
- Workplaces: Seoul National University

Baek Sung-hee (Korean: 백성희; born 1970) is a South Korean scientist specialising in molecular genetics. Her work is focused on the chromatin dynamics and epigenetic regulatory mechanism in cancer. She received her BS, MS, and Ph.D. degrees from Seoul National University. Following her postdoctoral research in Michael Rosenfeld's lab at HHMI and following research assistant professor at HHMI, she joined the faculty of Seoul National University in 2003, and now works as an associate professor. Baek received numerous awards and honors, including the L’Oreal-UNESCO for Women in Science Award.

== Awards ==
- 2005 Breakthrough Award, L’Oréal Korea-UNESCO for Women in Science Award
- 2011 Academic Achievement Award, L’Oréal Korea-UNESCO for Women in Science Award
- 2012 Woman Scientist/Engineer of the Year Award, Korea Science and Engineering Foundation
- 2015 Kyung-Ahm Prize

== Publications ==
- Lee, Ji Min; Lee, Jason S.; Kim, Hyunkyung; Kim, Kyeongkyu; Park, Hyejin; Kim, Ji-Young; Lee, Seung Hoon; Kim, Ik Soo; Kim, Joomyung; Lee, Minkyoung; Chung, Chin Ha; Seo, Sang-Beom; Yoon, Jong-Bok; Ko, Eunyoung; Noh, Dong-Young; Kim, Keun Il; Kim, Kyeong Kyu; Baek, Sung Hee (2012). "EZH2 Generates a Methyl Degron that is Recognized by the DCAF1/DDB1/CUL4 E3 Ubiquitin Ligase Complex". Molecular Cell. 48 (4): 572–86. doi:10.1016/j.molcel.2012.09.004. PMID 23063525.
- Kim, Ik Soo; Lee, Minkyoung; Park, Koog Chan; Jeon, Yoon; Park, Joo Hyeon; Hwang, Eun Ju; Jeon, Tae Im; Ko, Seoyoung; Lee, Ho; Baek, Sung Hee; Kim, Keun Il (2012). "Roles of Mis18α in Epigenetic Regulation of Centromeric Chromatin and CENP-A Loading". Molecular Cell. 46 (3): 260–73. doi:10.1016/j.molcel.2012.03.021. PMID 22516971.
- Kim, Hyunkyung; Lee, Ji Min; Lee, Gina; Bhin, Jinhyuk; Oh, Se Kyu; Kim, Kyeongkyu; Pyo, Ki Eun; Lee, Jason S.; Yim, Hwa Young; Kim, Keun Il; Hwang, Daehee; Chung, Jongkyeong; Baek, Sung Hee (2011). "DNA Damage-Induced RORα is Crucial for p53 Stabilization and Increased Apoptosis". Molecular Cell. 44 (5): 797–810. doi:10.1016/j.molcel.2011.09.023. PMID 22152482.
- Lee, Jason S.; Kim, Yunho; Bhin, Jinhyuk; Shin, Hi-Jai R.; Nam, Hye Jin; Lee, Seung Hoon; Yoon, Jong-Bok; Binda, Olivier; Gozani, Or; Hwang, D.; Baek, S. H. (2011). "Hypoxia-induced methylation of a pontin chromatin remodeling factor". Proceedings of the National Academy of Sciences. 108 (33): 13510–5. Bibcode:2011PNAS..10813510L. doi:10.1073/pnas.1106106108. PMC 3158161. PMID 21825155.
- Baek, Sung Hee (2011). "When Signaling Kinases Meet Histones and Histone Modifiers in the Nucleus". Molecular Cell. 42 (3): 274–84. doi:10.1016/j.molcel.2011.03.022. PMID 21549306.
- Lee, Jason S.; Kim, Yunho; Kim, Ik Soo; Kim, Bogyou; Choi, Hee June; Lee, Ji Min; Shin, Hi-Jai R.; Kim, Jung Hwa; Kim, Ji-Young; Seo, Sang-Beom; Lee, Ho; Binda, Olivier; Gozani, Or; Semenza, Gregg L.; Kim, Minhyung; Kim, Keun Il; Hwang, Daehee; Baek, Sung Hee (2010). "Negative Regulation of Hypoxic Responses via Induced Reptin Methylation". Molecular Cell. 39 (1): 71–85. doi:10.1016/j.molcel.2010.06.008. PMC 4651011. PMID 20603076.
- Lee, Ji Min; Kim, Ik Soo; Kim, Hyunkyung; Lee, Jason S.; Kim, Kyeongkyu; Yim, Hwa Young; Jeong, Jiyeong; Kim, Jung Hwa; Kim, Ji-Young; Lee, Hanna; Seo, Sang-Beom; Kim, Hogeun; Rosenfeld, Michael G.; Kim, Keun Il; Baek, Sung Hee (2010). "RORα Attenuates Wnt/β-Catenin Signaling by PKCα-Dependent Phosphorylation in Colon Cancer". Molecular Cell. 37 (2): 183–95. doi:10.1016/j.molcel.2009.12.022. PMID 20122401.
- Baek, Sung Hee (2008). "When ATPases Pontin and Reptin Met Telomerase". Developmental Cell. 14 (4): 459–61. doi:10.1016/j.devcel.2008.03.018. PMID 18410720.
- Kim, Jung Hwa; Lee, Ji Min; Nam, Hee June; Choi, Jung Woo; Yang, Jung Woo; Lee, Jason S.; Kim, Mi Hyang; Kim, Su-Il; Chung, Chin Ha; Kim, K. I.; Baek, S. H. (2007). "SUMOylation of pontin chromatin-remodeling complex reveals a signal integration code in prostate cancer cells". Proceedings of the National Academy of Sciences. 104 (52): 20793–8. Bibcode:2007PNAS..10420793K. doi:10.1073/pnas.0710343105. JSTOR 25450980. PMC 2410081. PMID 18087039.
- Kim, Jung Hwa; Choi, Hee June; Kim, Bogyou; Kim, Mi Hyang; Lee, Ji Min; Kim, Ik Soo; Lee, Moon Hee; Choi, Soo Joon; Kim, Keun Il; Kim, Su-Il; Chung, Chin Ha; Baek, Sung Hee (2006). "Roles of sumoylation of a reptin chromatin-remodelling complex in cancer metastasis". Nature Cell Biology. 8 (6): 631–9. doi:10.1038/ncb1415. PMID 16699503. S2CID 36037879.
- Zhu, Ping; Baek, Sung Hee; Bourk, Eliot M.; Ohgi, Kenneth A.; Garcia-Bassets, Ivan; Sanjo, Hideki; Akira, Shizuo; Kotol, Paul F.; Glass, Christopher K.; Rosenfeld, Michael G.; Rose, David W. (2006). "Macrophage/Cancer Cell Interactions Mediate Hormone Resistance by a Nuclear Receptor Derepression Pathway". Cell. 124 (3): 615–29. doi:10.1016/j.cell.2005.12.032. PMID 16469706.
- Baek, Sung Hee; Ohgi, Kenneth A.; Nelson, Charles A.; Welsbie, Derek; Chen, Charlie; Sawyers, Charles L.; Rose, David W.; Rosenfeld, Michael G. (2006). "Ligand-specific allosteric regulation of coactivator functions of androgen receptor in prostate cancer cells". Proceedings of the National Academy of Sciences. 103 (9): 3100–5. Bibcode:2006PNAS..103.3100B. doi:10.1073/pnas.0510842103. JSTOR 30048543. PMC 1413901. PMID 16492776.
- Kim, Jung Hwa; Kim, Bogyou; Cai, Ling; Choi, Hee June; Ohgi, Kenneth A.; Tran, Chris; Chen, Charlie; Chung, Chin Ha; Huber, Otmar; Rose, David W.; Sawyers, Charles L.; Rosenfeld, Michael G.; Baek, Sung Hee (2005). "Transcriptional regulation of a metastasis suppressor gene by Tip60 and β-catenin complexes". Nature. 434 (7035): 921–6. Bibcode:2005Natur.434..921K. doi:10.1038/nature03452. PMID 15829968. S2CID 4418988.
- Kioussi, Chrissa; Briata, Paola; Baek, Sung Hee; Rose, David W.; Hamblet, Natasha S.; Herman, Thomas; Ohgi, Kenneth A.; Lin, Chijen; Gleiberman, Anatoli; Wang, Jianbo; Brault, V; Ruiz-Lozano, P; Nguyen, HD; Kemler, R; Glass, CK; Wynshaw-Boris, A; Rosenfeld, MG (2002). "Identification of a Wnt/Dvl/β-Catenin → Pitx2 Pathway Mediating Cell-Type-Specific Proliferation during Development". Cell. 111 (5): 673–85. doi:10.1016/S0092-8674(02)01084-X. PMID 12464179.
- Baek, Sung Hee; Ohgi, Kenneth A.; Rose, David W.; Koo, Edward H.; Glass, Christopher K.; Rosenfeld, Michael G. (2002). "Exchange of N-CoR Corepressor and Tip60 Coactivator Complexes Links Gene Expression by NF-κB and β-Amyloid Precursor Protein". Cell. 110 (1): 55–67. doi:10.1016/S0092-8674(02)00809-7. PMID 12150997.
