= Gaheon Academic Award =

Academic award of South Korea

- Date: 1998
- Country: South Korea
- Presented by: Gaheon Shindo Foundation, Korean Institute of Information Scientists and Engineers, Korean Society for Precision Engineering, Society for Computational Design and Engineering
- Reward: KRW 20 million
- First award: 1999
- Website: Gaheon Shindo Foundation (Korean)

- Gaheon Academic Award
- Hangul: 가헌학술상
- RR: Gaheon haksulsang
- MR: Kahŏn haksulsang

The Gaheon Academic Award (Korean: 가헌학술상) is a set of academic prizes awarded in South Korea. The awards were established in 1998 by the Gaheon Shindo Foundation and are presented by the Korean Institute of Information Scientists and Engineers, the Korean Society for Precision Engineering, and the Society for Computational Design and Engineering. Laureates receive KRW 20 million and a plaque as part of the award.

== Laureates ==
Year	Korean Institute of Information Scientists and Engineers	Affiliation	Korean Society for Precision Engineering	Affiliation	Society for Computational Design and Engineering	Affiliation
1998	-	-	Yang Dong-yeol (양동열)	KAIST	-	-
1999	Yoo Hyuk (유혁)	Korea University	Lee Sang-jo (이상조)	Yonsei University	Lee Sang-heon (이상헌); Lee Geon-woo (이건우)	Seoul National University; Seoul National University
2000	Lee Kwang-geun (이광근)	Seoul National University	Kim Seung-woo (김승우)	KAIST	Choi Byeong-gyu (최병규); Pyeon Young-sik (편영식); Kim Bo-hyun (김보현); Kim Dae-hyun (김대현)	KAIST; Sun Moon University; KAIST; Winia Electronics
2001	Hwang Gyu-young (황규영)	KAIST	Joo Jong-nam (주종남)	Seoul National University	Yang Sang-wook (양상욱); Choi Young (최영)	Chung-Ang University; Chung-Ang University
2002	Choi Byeong-ju (최병주)	Ewha Womans University	Yang Min-yang (양민양)	KAIST	Jang Tae-beom (장태범); Shin Ha-yong (신하용); Lee Hyeon-chan (이현찬); Ryu Jung-hyun (류중현); Kim Deok-su (김덕수)	Chrysler; Chrysler; Hongik University; Hanyang University; Hanyang University
2003	Ahn Jong-seok (안종석)	Dongguk University	Jo Dong-woo (조동우)	Pohang University of Science and Technology	Hahn Sun-heung (한순흥); Moon Doo-hwan (문두환)	KAIST; KAIST
2004	Shin Seung-cheol (신승철); Byun Seok-woo (변석우); Jeong Ju-hee (정주희); Do Kyung-gu (도경구)	Dongyang University; Kyungsung University; Kyungpook National University; Hanyang University	Chae Soo-won (채수원)	Korea University	Shin Jong-gye (신종계); Ryu Cheol-ho (류철호)	Seoul National University; Seoul National University
2005	Kim Ji-hong (김지홍)	Seoul National University	Kim Jong-won (김종원)	Seoul National University	Shin Jong-gye (최병규); Shin Ha-yong (신하용); Jeong Chun-seok (정춘석); Jeong Won-hyung (정원형)	KAIST; KAIST; KAIST; KAIST
2006	Choi Rin (최린)	Korea University	Lee Seok-hee (이석희)	Pusan National University	Kim Tae-wan (김태완); Lee Gyu-yeol (이규열); Cha Joo-hwan (차주환)	Seoul National University; Seoul National University; Seoul National University
2007	Won Gwang-yeon (원광연)	KAIST	Lee Eung-sook (이응숙)	Korea Institute of Machinery and Materials	Park Hyung-jun (박형준); Lee Ju-haeng (이주행)	Chosun University; Electronics and Telecommunications Research Institute
2008	Yoo Jae-soo (유재수)	Chungbuk National University	Go Tae-jo (고태조)	Yeungnam University	Song Seong-jae (송성재); Kim Seong-hwan (김성환)	Gangneung-Wonju National University; Seoul National University of Science and Technology
2009	Ha Ran (하란)	Hongik University	Lee Chun-man (이춘만)	Changwon National University	Jeon Yong-tae (전용태); Seo Jeong-woo (서정우)	Sejong University; Sejong University
2010	Hong Chung-seon (홍충선)	Kyung Hee University	Hong Dae-hee (홍대희)	Korea University	Lee Soo-hong (이수홍); Bae Il-ju (배일주); Jeon Ki-hyun (전기현)	Yonsei University; Yonsei University; Yonsei University
2011	Lee Wonjun (이원준)	Korea University	Ahn Sung-hoon (안성훈)	Seoul National University	Shin Sang-gyun (신상균); Kim Rae-hyun (김래현); Park Se-hyung (박세형); Chu Heon-seong (추헌성); Jeon Cha-su (전차수)	KIST; KIST; KIST; Gyeongsang National University; Gyeongsang National University
2012	Jeong Gwang-su (정광수)	Kwangwoon University	Han Chang-soo (한창수)	Hanyang University	Jeong Yong-ho (정융호); Park Sung-bae (박성배); Yoon Jae-deuk (윤재득); Lee Jeong-un (이정운)	Pusan National University; Hyundai Motor Company; Pusan National University; Pusan National University
2013	Lee Seong-hwan (이성환)	Korea University	Jeong Hae-do (정해도)	Pusan National University	Kim Jae-jung (김재정); Lee Soon-hyuk (이순혁); Chae Jae-wook (채재욱); Park Eun-joo (박은주); Koo Bon-yeol (구본열); Park Byeong-geon (박병건)	Hanyang University; Korea University; Agency for Defense Development; Hanyang University; Hanyang University; Hanyang University
2014	Lee Seung-yong (이승용)	Pohang University of Science and Technology	Seok Chang-seong (석창성)	Sungkyunkwan University	Hahn Sun-heung (한순흥); Moon Doo-hwan (문두환); Park Seon-ah (박선아); Kwon Soon-jo (권순조); Kim Byeong-cheol (김병철}	KAIST; Kyungpook National University; Kyungpook National University; KAIST; Dong-A University
2015	Lee Seung-ryong (이승룡)	Kyung Hee University	Min Byeong-kwon (민병권)	Yonsei University	Lee Ju-haeng (이주행); Lee Joo-ho (이주호); Lee Ah-hyun (이아현)	Electronics and Telecommunications Research Institute; Ritz American University; Graduate School of Korea Advanced Institute of Science and Technology
2016	Won Yu-jib (원유집)	Hanyang University	Ahn Hyung-jun (안형준)	Soongsil University	Choi Sang-young (최상영); Park Kang (박강); Jang Eun-soo (장은수); Yoo-cheol (유철)	Myongji University; Myongji University; Myongji University; Myongji University
2017	Jo Seong-bae (조성배)	Yonsei University	Lee Gye-han (이계한)	Myongji University	No Sang-do (노상도); Lee Joo-yeon (이주연); Jeon Chan-mo (전찬모)	Sungkyunkwan University; Sungkyunkwan University; Sungkyunkwan University
2018	-	-	Lee In-hwan (이인환)	Chungbuk National University	Park Min-geun (박민근); Jeong Yong-ho (정융호); Jianhui Fu; Park Rae-seong (박래성)	Samsung Heavy Industries; Pusan National University; Pusan National University; Pusan National University
2019	Shim Gyu-seok (심규석)	Seoul National University	Kim Byung-hee (김병희)	Kangwon National University	Go Gwang-hee (고광희); Lee Jun-hee (이준희)	Gwangju Institute of Science and Technology; Gwangju Institute of Science and Technology
2020	-	-	Kim Jong (김정)	KAIST	Lee Yong-gu (이용구); Lee Jung-jae (이정재); Yoon Joo-sun (윤주선)	Gwangju Institute of Science and Technology; Gwangju Institute of Science and Technology; Gwangju Institute of Science and Technology
2021	Kim Sang-wook (김상욱)	Hanyang University	Kim Gyu-man (김규만)	Kyungpook National University	Kim Byeong-cheol (김병철); Kwon Ki-yeon (권기연)	Korea University of Technology and Education; Kumoh National Institute of Technology
2022	Lee Sang-won (이상원)	Sungkyunkwan University	Park Sang-hoo (박상후)	Pusan National University	Moon Doo-hwan (문두환); Kim Hyung-ki (김형기); Kim Mi-joo (김미주); Lee Won-yong (이원용)	Korea University; Jeonbuk National University; Jeonbuk National University; Jeonbuk National University
2023	-	-	Lee Dong-won (이동원)	Chonnam National University	-	-
2024	Ryu Seok-young (류석영)	KAIST	Jeong Jae-il (정재일)	Kookmin University	Kim Kwan-hoon (김관훈); Oh Min-jae (오민재); Jeong Da-yeon (정다연)	HD Hyundai Heavy Industries; University of Ulsan; University of Ulsan
2025	Hahn Bo-hyung (한보형)	Seoul National University	Kim Bo-hyun (김보현)	Soongsil University	-	-

== See also ==
- Korea Science Award
- Korea Engineering Award
