= Mi Hee Lim =

Korean chemist

Mi Hee Lim (임미희, 1975~) is a KAIST Endowed Chair Professor in the Department of Chemistry in KAIST, South Korea and the Director of the Lim Lab at the Center for MNPC.

== Education ==
Mi Hee Lim received her bachelor's degree in Chemistry at Ewha Womans University in 1999, her master's in Molecular Life Science at Ewha Womans University in 2001, and completed her Ph.D. in Chemistry in Massachusetts Institute of Technology in 2006.

== Career ==
After receiving her doctorate degree in 2006, Mi Hee Lim became a postdoctoral scholar at California Institute of Technology until 2008, and served as a Research Assistant Professor in the Life Sciences Institute at the University of Michigan from 2008 to 2013. She then moved to South Korea and acquired her position as Associate Professor of Chemistry at the Ulsan Institute of Science and Technology until 2018 and transferred to KAIST as an Associate Professor of Chemistry until 2020, where she has taken position as Endowed Chair Professor until the present.

== Books ==
Mi Hee Lim participated in the "Fluorescence-Based Nitric Oxide Detection" Chapter of the book Advanced Concepts in Fluorescence Spectroscopy.

== Awards ==
- 2007: ACS Division of Inorganic Chemistry Young Investigator Award
- 2010: Alzheimer's Association New Investigators Award
- 2012: The Paul Saltman Award, Metals in Biology Gordon Conference (2012)
- 2012: The Scientist Development Award from the American Heart Association
- 2013: NSF Career Award
- 2014: UNIST Outstanding Performance Award
- 2015: KCS-Wiley Young Scientist Award
- 2016: Chemical Society of Japan (CSJ) Distinguished Lectureship Award
- 2016: Award for "30 Young Scientists of Korea" to Lead Basic Science Research for the Next 30 Years
- 2018: Young Inorganic Chemist Award, KCS Inorganic Division
- 2020: Asian Biological Inorganic Chemistry (AsBIC) James Hoeschele Award
- 2021: S-Oil Next-Generation Scientist Award (S-Oil Science Prodigy & Culture Foundation & The Korean Academy of Science and Technology (KAST))
- 2021: Woman Scientist/Engineer of the Year Award
- 2023: RIGAKU-ACCC Award (Asian Conference on Coordination Chemistry, ACCC)
- 2024: Fellow of the Korean Academy of Science and Technology (KAST)

== Publications ==
- Bioorganic Chemistry & Metalloneurochemistry
- Insights into antiamyloidogenic properties of the green tea extract (-)-epigallocatechin-3-gallate toward metal-associated amyloid-β species
- Mechanistic approaches for chemically modifying the coordination sphere of copper–amyloid-β complexes
- Crystallographic and spectroscopic characterization of a nonheme Fe (IV)= O complex
- The central role of the d-block metals in the periodic table

== Patents ==
Mi Hee Lim's registered patents include Method for preparing brain microvascular endothelial cells from pluripotent stem cells and use thereof from 2018. In 2019, patents, namely Composition including benzene diamine derivative for preventing or treating degenerative brain diseases, Composition For Preventing Or Treating Hair Loss Including Benzene Diamine Derivative, and Formulation For Enhanced Transdermal Absorption Of Drug were registered under Mihee Lim.

The NN--p- Composition for preventing improving or treating Alzheimer's disease comprising NN-Diacetyl-p-phenylenediamine as an active ingredient was registered solely under Mihee Lim in 2020.
