= Kim Eunkyoung =

South Korean materials chemist

Eunkyoung Kim
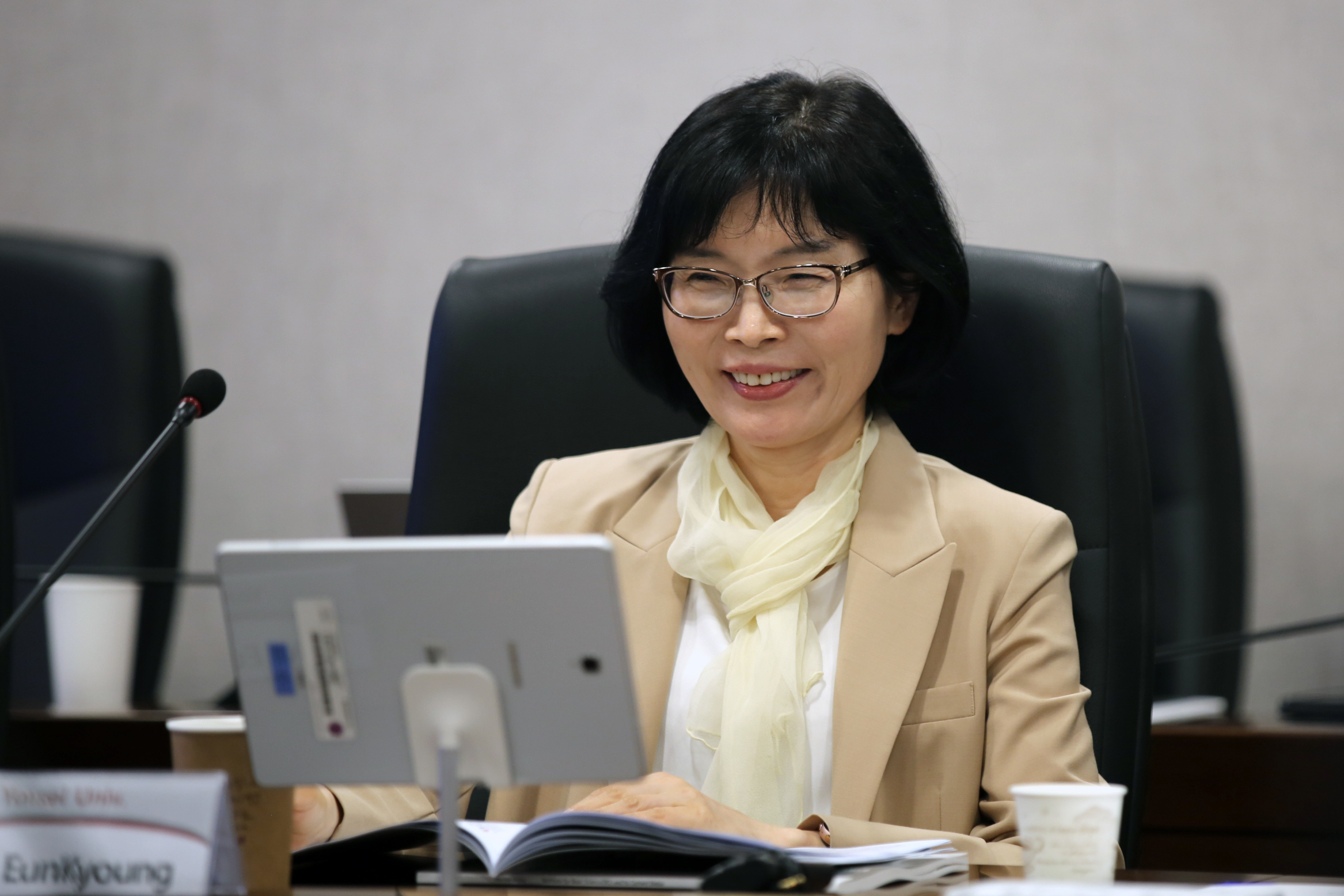
- Born: South Korea
- Education: Yonsei University (BS); Seoul National University (MS); University of Houston (PhD)
- Scientific career
- Workplaces: Yonsei University; Korea Institute of Science and Technology; Korea Research Institute of Chemical Technology
- Thesis: Charge transfer complexes of the nitrosonium cation with arenes (1990)

Korean name
- Hangul: 김은경
- RR: Gim Eungyeong
- MR: Kim Ŭn'gyŏng

Eunkyoung Kim (Korean: 김은경) is a South Korean materials chemist who is a professor in the Department of Chemical and Biomolecular Engineering at Yonsei University. Her research considers functional polymers, including electro- and photo-chromic materials and bioelectronic materials. She was made a member of the National Academy of Engineering of Korea in 2016.

== Early life and education ==
Kim studied chemistry at Yonsei University graduating with a BS in 1982. After earning her undergraduate degree, she moved to the Korea Institute of Science and Technology as a research scientist. She went to Seoul National University obtaining her master's degree in 1984, and the University of Houston for her doctorate which she completed in 1990. Her doctoral research considered the development of arene-based charge transfer complexes. Kim then spent two years as an assistant professor at the University of Houston.

== Research and career ==
Kim joined the Korea Research Institute of Chemical Technology in 1992, where she worked as a Principal Research Scientist and Chair of Advanced Materials. She moved to Yonsei University in 2004. Her research considers the development of polymer materials for electro- and photo-chromic materials. In 2006, she was one of the first to report an example of an electrofluorochromic (EFC) window. EFC materials enhance electrochromic (EC) displays' applications in dark conditions and increase their potential for security, encryption, and analytical uses. She and her research group have improved EC/EFC materials by designing substituents to optimize EC bistability in order to prevent charge leakage and introducing TiO_{2} nanoparticles (TNP) as a transparent ion storage layer to lower power consumption. In 2018 Kim was made Chair of the American Chemical Society Korean chapter.

== Awards and honours ==
- 2001 Korean Ministry of Science and Technology Woman Scientist of the Year
- 2009 AMOREPACIFIC Award for Outstanding Women in the Sciences
- 2013 Yonsei University Underwood Distinguished Professor
- 2014 Polymer Society of Korea Samsung Polymer Award
- 2015 Ecole Normale Superieure de Cachan Honorary Doctorate
- 2016 Member of the National Academy of Engineering of Korea

== Selected publications ==
- Jaemoon Yang; Jihye Choi; Doyeon Bang; et al. (2011). "Convertible organic nanoparticles for near-infrared photothermal ablation of cancer cells". Angewandte Chemie International Edition. 50 (2): 441–444. doi:10.1002/anie.201005075. PMID 21132823. Wikidata Q39623569.
- Teahoon Park; Chihyun Park; Byeonggwan Kim; Haejin Shin; Kim, Eun-gyeong (2013). "Flexible PEDOT electrodes with large thermoelectric power factors to generate electricity by the touch of fingertips". Energy & Environmental Science. 6 (3): 788. doi:10.1039/c3ee23729j. Wikidata Q63549195.
- Jong Kwan Koh; Jeonghun Kim; Byeonggwan Kim; Jong Hak Kim; Kim, Eun-gyeong (2011). "Highly efficient, iodine-free dye-sensitized solar cells with solid-state synthesis of conducting polymers". Advanced Materials. 23 (14): 1641–1646. doi:10.1002/adma.201004715. PMID 21472792. Wikidata Q83801815.
