= International Conference on Distributed Computing Systems =

- Abbreviation: ICDCS
- Discipline: Distributed computing

Publication details
- Publisher: IEEE Computer Society
- History: 1979–
- Frequency: annual (since 1984)

The International Conference on Distributed Computing Systems (ICDCS) is the oldest conference in the field of distributed computing systems in the world. It was launched by the IEEE Computer Society Technical Committee on Distributed Processing (TCDP) in October 1979, and is sponsored by such committee. It was started as an 18-month conference until 1983 and became an annual conference since 1984. The ICDCS has a long history of significant achievements and worldwide visibility, and has recently celebrated its 37th year.

== Location history ==
- 2019: Dallas, Texas, United States
- 2018: Vienna, Austria
- 2017: Atlanta, GA, United States
- 2016: Nara, Japan
- 2015: Columbus, Ohio, United States
- 2014: Madrid, Spain
- 2013: Philadelphia, Pennsylvania, United States
- 2012: Macau, China
- 2011: Minneapolis, Minnesota, United States
- 2010: Genoa, Italy
- 2009: Montreal, Quebec, Canada
- 2008: Beijing, China
- 2007: Toronto, Ontario, Canada
- 2006: Lisbon, Portugal
- 2005: Columbus, Ohio, United States
- 2004: Keio University, Japan
- 2003: Providence, RI, United States
- 2002: Vienna, Austria
- 2001: Phoenix, AZ, United States
- 2000: Taipei, Taiwan
- 1999: Austin, TX, United States
- 1998: Amsterdam, The Netherlands
- 1997: Baltimore, MD, United States
- 1996: Hong Kong
- 1995: Vancouver, Canada
- 1994: Poznań, Poland
- 1993: Pittsburgh, PA, United States
- 1992: Yokohama, Japan
- 1991: Arlington, TX, United States
- 1990: Paris, France
- 1989: Newport Beach, CA, United States
- 1988: San Jose, CA, United States
- 1987: Berlin, Germany
- 1986: Cambridge, MA, United States
- 1985: Denver, CO, United States
- 1984: San Francisco, CA, United States
- 1983: Hollywood, FL, United States
- 1981: Versailles, France
- 1979: Huntsville, AL, United States

== See also ==
- List of distributed computing conferences
