= Choi Ki-young =

South Korean electrical engineer (born 1955)

- 최기영
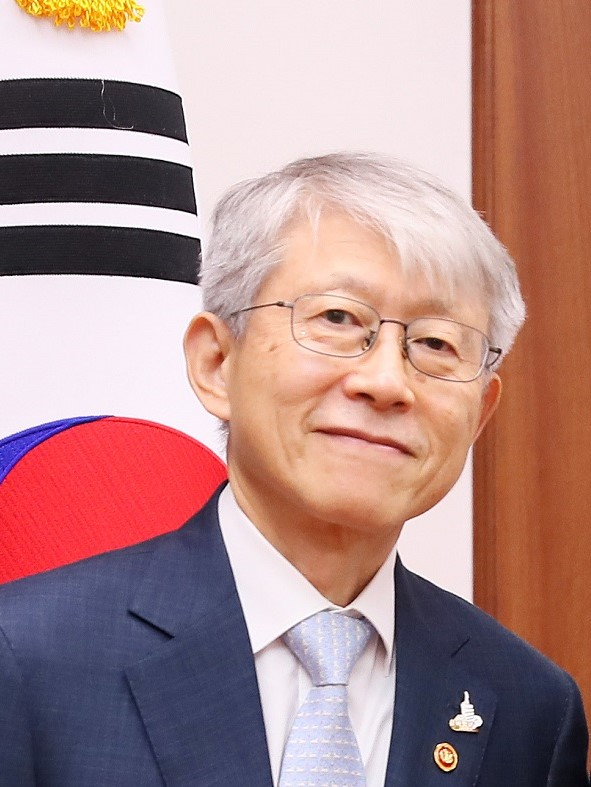

Minister of Science and ICT
- In office 9 September 2019 – 13 May 2021
- President: Moon Jae-in
- Prime Minister: Lee Nak-yeon; Chung Sye-kyun
- Preceded by: Yoo Yeong-min
- Succeeded by: Lim Hyesook

Personal details
- Born: 1955 (age 70–71) Seoul, South Korea
- Party: Independent
- Education: Seoul National University; KAIST; Stanford University

Choi Ki-young (Korean: 최기영; born 1955), also known as Kiyoung Choi, is a South Korean professor of electrical engineering at Seoul National University who served as Minister of Science and ICT under President Moon Jae-in from 2019 to 2021.

After working at now-LG Electronics (then Goldstar) and Cadence Design Systems, he return to his first alma mater. He took several roles in his faculty including the director of Neural Processing Research Center and Embedded Systems Research Center.

In May 2026, he was appointed as Representative Director of Anthropic Korea.

In 2017, he became a fellow of Institute of Electrical and Electronics Engineers.

He holds three degrees in electrical engineering - a bachelor from Seoul National University, a master's from KAIST and a doctorate from Stanford University.

He has a wife who is a professor of computer software at Hanyang University, a brother a professor of physics and astronomy at Seoul National University, a sister a retired professor of Chinese studies at Yonsei University.
