= International Conference on Big Data and Smart Computing =

Annual computing event in Asia established 2014

International Conference on Big Data and Smart Computing (BigComp)
- Status: Active
- Genre: Big data and smart computing
- Frequency: Annual
- Years active: 12
- Sponsors: Korean Institute of Information Scientists and Engineers and IEEE
- Website: BigComp website

The International Conference on Big Data and Smart Computing (BigComp) is an annual conference on the themes of big data and smart computing. Founded in 2014 by the Korean Institute of Information Scientists and Engineers (KIISE), the conference is co-sponsored by KIISE and IEEE. The conference has primarily been held in cities across the Asia-Pacific region, reflecting its regional research focus while maintaining international participation.

== Scope and topics ==
BigComp provides a forum for researchers, practitioners, and industry professionals to present original research and work-in-progress reports on topics such as:

- Big data analytics and social media
- Machine learning and AI for big data
- Data mining and data science
- Cloud and grid computing for big data
- Security, privacy, and smart computing systems
- Big data applications and services

== Publications and indexing ==
Accepted papers are published through IEEE Xplore and BigComp proceedings are indexed in DBLP.

== List of BigComp ==
Edition	Name	Dates	Location
1	BigComp2014	January 15-17, 2014	Bangkok, Thailand
2	BigComp2015	February 9-12, 2015	Jeju Island, South Korea
3	BigComp2016	January 18-20, 2016	Hong Kong, China
4	BigComp2017	February 13-16, 2017	Jeju Island, South Korea
5	BigComp2018	January 15-18, 2018	Shanghai, China
6	BigComp2019	February 27-March 2, 2019	Kyoto, Japan
7	BigComp2020	February 19-22, 2020	Busan, South Korea
8	BigComp2021	February 19-22, 2021	Jeju Island, South Korea
9	BigComp2022	January 17-20, 2022	Daegu, South Korea
10	BigComp2023	February 13-16, 2023	Jeju Island, South Korea
11	BigComp2024	February 18-21, 2024	Bangkok, Thailand
12	BigComp2025	February 9-12, 2025	Kota Kinabalu, Malaysia
13	BigComp2026	February 2-5, 2026	Guangzhou, China

== See also ==
- ACM/IEEE Supercomputing Conference
