= National Research Foundation of Korea =

Government organization of South Korea

- 한국연구재단
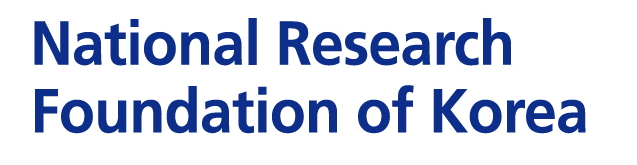
- English version logo of NRF

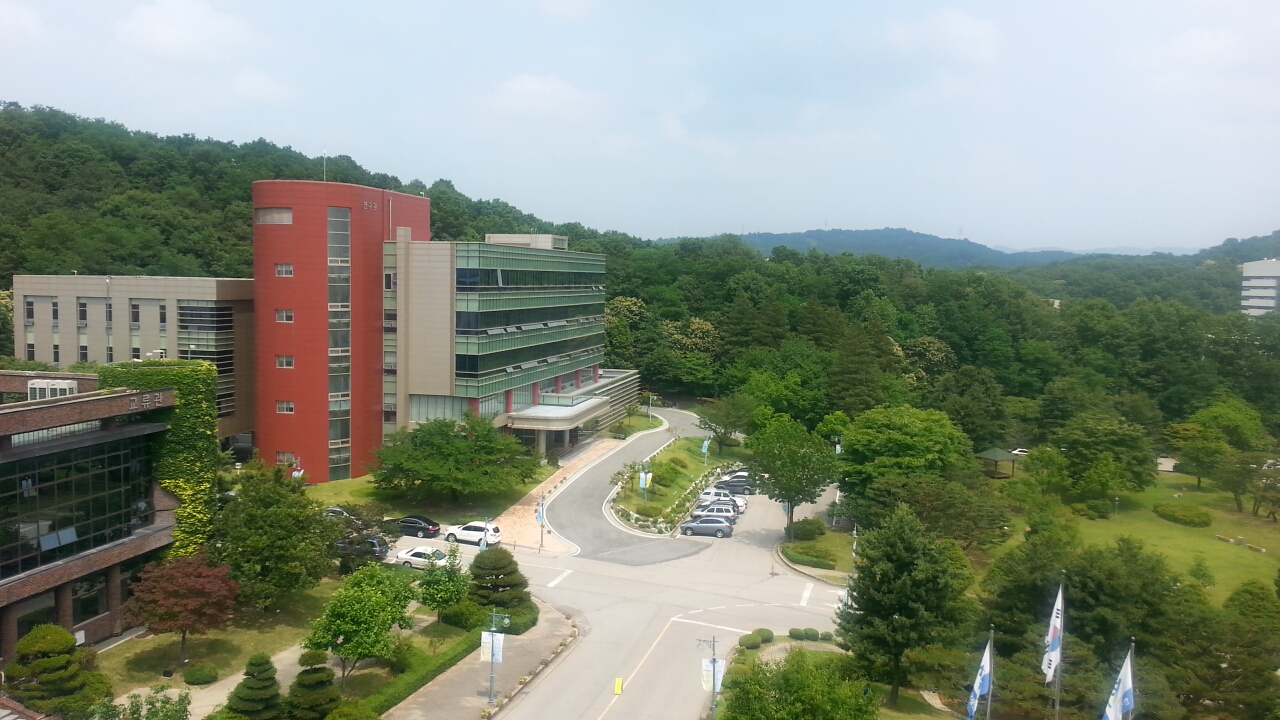
- Headquarters in Daejeon
- Abbreviation: NRF
- Formation: June 26, 2009; 16 years ago
- Merger of: Korea Science and Engineering Foundation (KOSEF); Korea Research Foundation (KRF); Korea Foundation for International Cooperation of Science and Technology (KICOS)
- Type: Governmental organisation
- Purpose: Research funding
- Headquarters: Daejeon, South Korea
- Location: Seoul, South Korea
- President: Lee Kwang-bok
- Website: www.nrf.re.kr

- National Research Foundation of Korea
- Hangul: 한국연구재단
- Hanja: 韓國硏究財團
- RR: Hanguk yeongu jaedan
- MR: Han'guk yŏn'gu chaedan

The National Research Foundation of Korea (NRF; Korean: 한국연구재단) is a research institute for Korean studies.

It was established in 2009 through a merger between the Korea Science and Engineering Foundation (KOSEF; 한국과학재단), Korea Research Foundation (KRF; 한국학술진흥재단; established in 1981), and Korea Foundation for International Cooperation of Science and Technology (KICOS; 국제과학기술협력재단).

Its offices are located in 25 Heolleung-ro, Seocho-gu, Seoul and 201 Gajeong-ro, Yuseong-gu, Daejeon.

== Budget ==
- Total: $6.427 million (US$1 = 1,100 KRW)
  - Basic Research in Science and Engineering ($1.864 million), Humanities & Social Sciences ($234 million), National Strategic R&D Programs ($2.032 million), Academic Research & University Funding ($2.071 million), International Cooperation ($67 million), Others Areas ($159 million)

== Organization ==
- 7 directorates, 2 centers, 18 divisions, 20 offices, 46 Teams
- President
  - Board of Directors
  - Policy Advisory Committee
  - Research Ethics Committee
- Audit
  - Office of Audits and Inspections
- Directorate for Basic Research in Science and Engineering
  - Division of Natural Sciences
  - Division of Life Sciences
  - Division of Medical Sciences
  - Division of Engineering
  - Division of ICT and Convergence Research
  - Office of Basic Research Planning
  - Office of Basic Research Management
- Directorate for Humanities & Social Sciences
  - Division of Humanities
  - Division of Social Sciences
  - Division of Arts, Culture and Convergence
  - Office of Humanities & Social Sciences Planning
  - Office of Humanities & Social Sciences Management
- Directorate for National Strategic R&D Programs
  - Division of Drug Discovery and Development
  - Division of Next Generation Biotechnology
  - Division of Neuroscience and Advanced Medical Technology
  - Division of Nano-Semiconductor Technology
  - Division of Material-Part Technology
  - Division of ICT & Convergence Technology
  - Division of Energy and Environment Technology
  - Division of Space Technology
  - Division of Nuclear Technology
  - Division of Public Technology
  - Office of National Strategic R&D Planning
  - Office of Fundamental R&D Programs
  - Office of Big Science Programs
- Directorate for Academic Research
  - Office of Academic Research Affairs
  - Office of HR Development
  - Office of University Education Management
  - Office of University-Industry Cooperation
- Directorate for International Affairs
  - Office of International Cooperation Planning
  - Office of International Cooperation Framework
  - Office of International Networks
- Directorate for Digital Innovation
  - Office of R&D Policy and Strategy
  - Office of Data & Information
  - Information Security Task Force
- Directorate for Management and Operations
  - Office of Administration
  - Office of Financial Management
- Office of Research Ethics
- Office of Planning and Coordination
- Office of Public Relations

== Presidents ==
- Park Chan-Mo (June 26, 2009 – January 19, 2011)
- Oh Se-Jung (January 20, 2011 – January 5, 2012)
- Lee Seung-Jong (January 6, 2012 – January 2, 2014)
- Chung Min-Keun (January 3, 2014 – August 22, 2016)
- Cho Moo-je (August 23, 2016 – July 8, 2018)
- Roe Jung-hye (July 9, 2018 – September 26, 2021)
- Lee Kwang-bok (September 27, 2021–present)

== See also ==
- Korea Citation Index
- Korean studies
- Government of South Korea
