= Cha University =

Private medical university in South Korea

Coordinates: 37.85668°N 127.13781°E

CHA University
- 차의과학대학교
- Former names: Pocheon School of Medicine
- Type: Medical school
- Established: 1996
- Location: 335 Pangyo-ro, Bundang-gu, Seongnam-si, 13488 Gyeonggi-do, South Korea, Pocheon, Pangyo, Seongnam Gyeonggi-do, South Korea
- Website: cha.ac.kr

Cha University is a private university in Pocheon and Pangyo, Seongnam, Gyeonggi-do, South Korea. It was founded on the basis of the three philosophies: Christianity, Humanism, and Academia.

== History ==
Cha University was founded in 1997 by Dr. Kwang-Yul Cha, a world-renowned scientist in reproductive medicine and the owner of Hollywood Presbyterian Medical Center in Los Angeles. Dr. Cha is the chairman of CHA Medical Group which is Cha Medical Centers in Gangnam, Bundang, Gumi, and Singapore medical group, City Fertility Centre, Cha University, Cha Biocomplex which is coordinated with Research and development in one place.

== Characteristics ==
As an effort to recruit competitive students, the medical school decided to offer a guaranteed full-ride academic scholarship upon admission for the majority of students, which gained immense popularity among pre-med college graduates. Although there is no reliable ranking system for medical schools in Korea, this medical school was the highest in medical schools in the nation in 2006 with regard to MEET scores, which is equivalent to the MCAT in the United States, despite its short history. It is also known that its graduates have the highest pass rate in Korea Medical Licensing Exam (KMLE).

== Undergraduate colleges ==
- College of Life Sciences
- College of Health Sciences
- College of Nursing
- College of Pharmacy
- College of Integrated Social Science

== Graduate schools ==
- Medical School
- Department of Biomedical Science
- Department of Medical Science
- Department of Nursing
- Department of Pharmacy
- Department of Active Aging Industry
- Graduate School of Integrated Medicine
- Graduate School of Health Industry
- Graduate School of Clinical Pharmacy
- Graduate School of Sports Medicine
- Graduate School of Art Therapy
- Graduate School of Clinical Counseling Psychology
- CHA Business School : MBA
