= You Young-min =

South Korean politician

Yoo Young-min
- 유영민

Chief of Staff to the President
- In office 1 January 2021 – 9 May 2022
- President: Moon Jae-in
- Preceded by: Noh Young-min
- Succeeded by: Kim Dae-ki

Minister of Science and ICT
- In office 11 July 2017 – 8 September 2019
- President: Moon Jae-in
- Prime Minister: Lee Nak-yon
- Preceded by: office established
- Succeeded by: Choi Ki-young

Personal details
- Born: 27 August 1951 (age 75) Busan, South Korea
- Party: Democratic
- Education: Pusan National University

Yoo Young-min (Korean: 유영민; Hanja: 兪英民; born 27 August 1951) is a South Korean politician served as the last Chief of Staff to the President Moon Jae-in from 2020 to 2022. Yoo previously served as his first Minister of Science and ICT from 2017 to 2019.

Yoo has built his career on ICT across sectors from private enterprise and academia to government.

After graduating in mathematics from Pusan National University, Yoo started working at LG Electronics's computing department. Before entering politics, he held senior managerial roles in major corporations in South Korea or their subsidiaries such as chief information officer of LG Electronics, vice president of LG CNS and chief operating officer of POSCO ICT. He led several government-funded institutes as the 4th president of now-National IT Industry Promotion Agency, vice president of Korean Institute of Information Scientists and Engineers and chief director of now-Korea Data Agency.

Yoo first entered politics in 2016. Then-democratic party leader, Moon Jae-in, recruited him for the general election in 2016 for Busan's affluent constituency. He ran for the same constituency again in 2020 after serving Moon as his science minister.

Yoo sat as a board member of G-Star organising committee from 2006 to 2007.

== Awards ==
- Order of Industrial Service Merit by the government of South Korea (2005)

== Electoral history ==
Election	Year	District	Party affiliation	Votes	Percentage of votes	Results
20th National Assembly General Election	2016	Busan Haeundae A	Democratic Party	40,563	41.01%	Lost
21st National Assembly General Election	2020	Busan Haeundae A	Democratic Party	49,633	37.38%	Lost
