= Korean Institute of Information Scientists and Engineers =

South Korean academic society

- Korean Institute of Information Scientists and Engineers
- Founded: March 3, 1973; 53 years ago
- Headquarters: 76 Bangbae-ro, Seocho-gu, Seoul, South Korea
- Fields: Computers and software
- Members: 42,000 (2022)
- Official languages: Korean and English
- President: Moon Sue
- Website: Official website (English)

Korean name
- Hangul: 한국정보과학회
- Hanja: 韓國情報科學會
- RR: Hanguk jeongbo gwahakhoe
- MR: Han'guk chŏngbo kwahakhoe

The Korean Institute of Information Scientists and Engineers (KIISE; Korean: 한국정보과학회) is an academic society in computer science and information technology in South Korea. Founded in 1973 for research, education, and industry collaboration in computing fields, the nonprofit has over 42,000 members. It organizes conferences, publishes journals, and serves a community of researchers, engineers, and students in areas spanning AI, software, systems, and theoretical computer science.

== History ==
The Institute was established on March 3, 1973 and recognized as a nonprofit on October 8, 1977. Also in 1977, it became a member of the International Federation for Information Processing. It has since established cooperative associations with overseas organization including ACM, IEEE, IEEE Computer Society, CCF, IPSJ, and ISS-IEICE. Their 50th anniversary occurred in 2024. In 2026, KIISE, CCF, IPSJ, Hong Kong and Singapore will jointly launch the Asia-Pacific Association of Computing (APAC).

== Journals ==
Launched in 1974, Journal of KIISE and KIISE Transactions on Computing Practices are published monthly. Communications of KIISE has been published monthly since its inception in 1983, and the Journal of Computing Science and Engineering (JCSE) is an English language journal published quarterly since 2007.

== Conferences ==
For annual domestic conferences, KIISE organizes the Korea Computer Congress (KCC), Korea Software Congress (KSC), Information and Technology and Industry Prospects Symposium (iTIP), and Software Convergence Symposium (SWCS). International conferences include the IEEE International Conference on Big Data and Smart Computing (BigComp) co-hosted by the IEEE, ICOIN, Bio-Health AI International Symposium, WAAC, NVMSA, and RTCSA.

== Awards ==
The Institute presents several awards including the Gaheon Academic Award, Young Information Scientist Award with the IEEE-CS, and multiple awards for publications.

== Leadership ==
KIISE is headed by a board of directors, president, and auditor. The president oversees multiple committees, societies, special interest groups, and chapters in Korea, the US, and Vietnam.

== See also ==
- You Young-min
