= Korea Research Institute of Chemical Technology =

South Korean research institute

Korea Research Institute of Chemical Technology (KRICT)
- 한국화학연구원
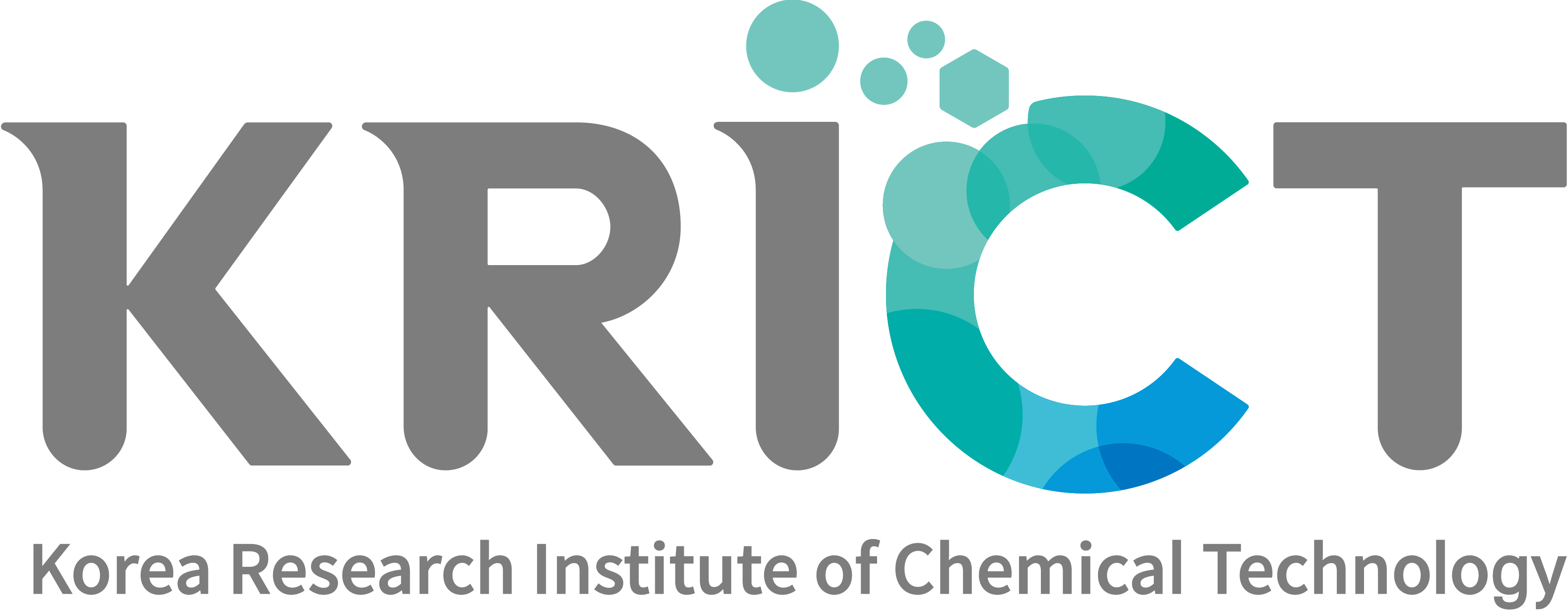
- Established: 1976
- Research type: Public research institute
- Budget: 161,709 million KRW (150 million USD) (2018)
- President: Young kuk Lee, Ph.D.
- Location: Daejeon, Ulsan and Yeosu, Republic of Korea
- Website: Korea Research Institute of Chemical Technology (KRICT)

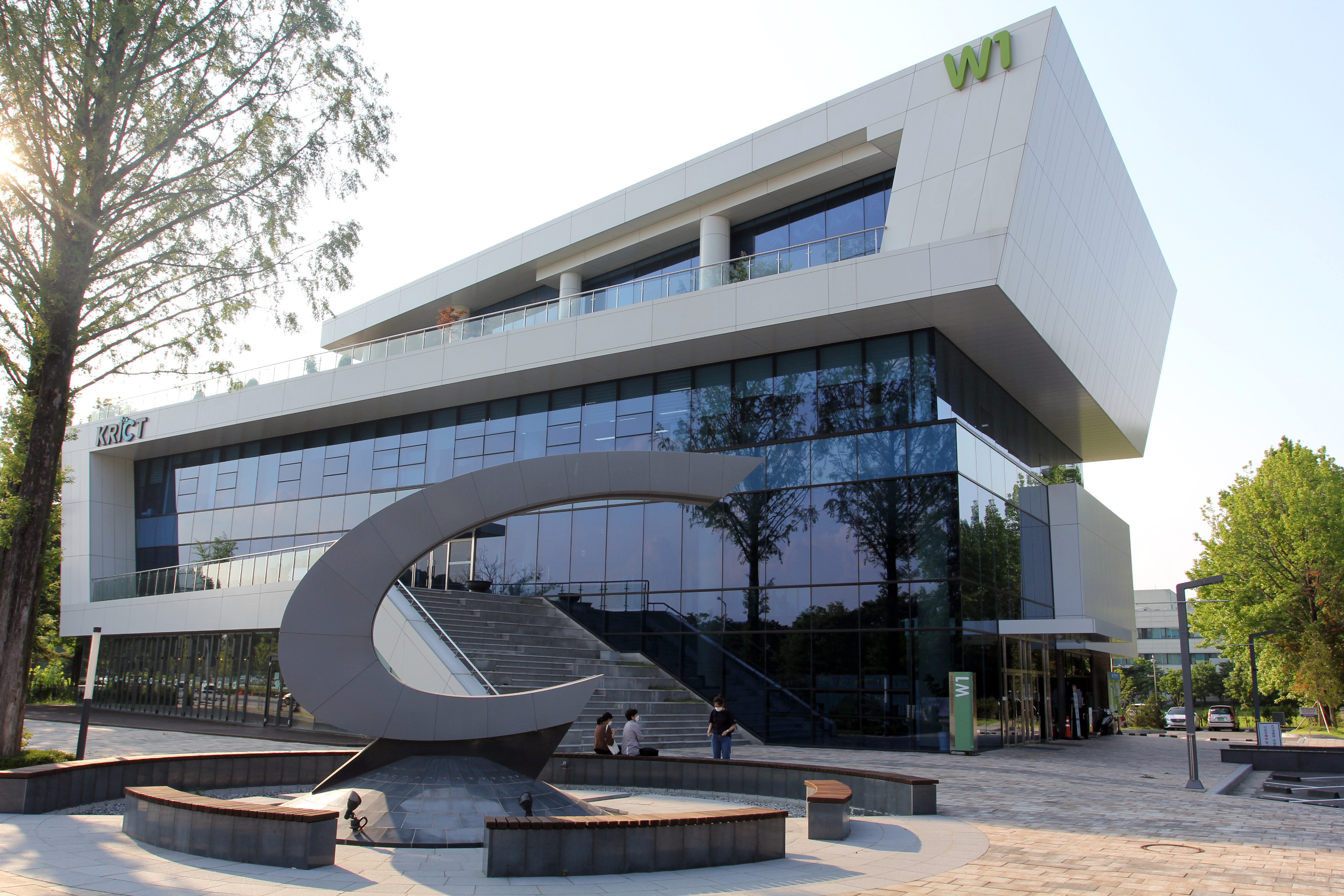
Didimol Plaza at the entrance to Korea Research Institute of Chemical Technology

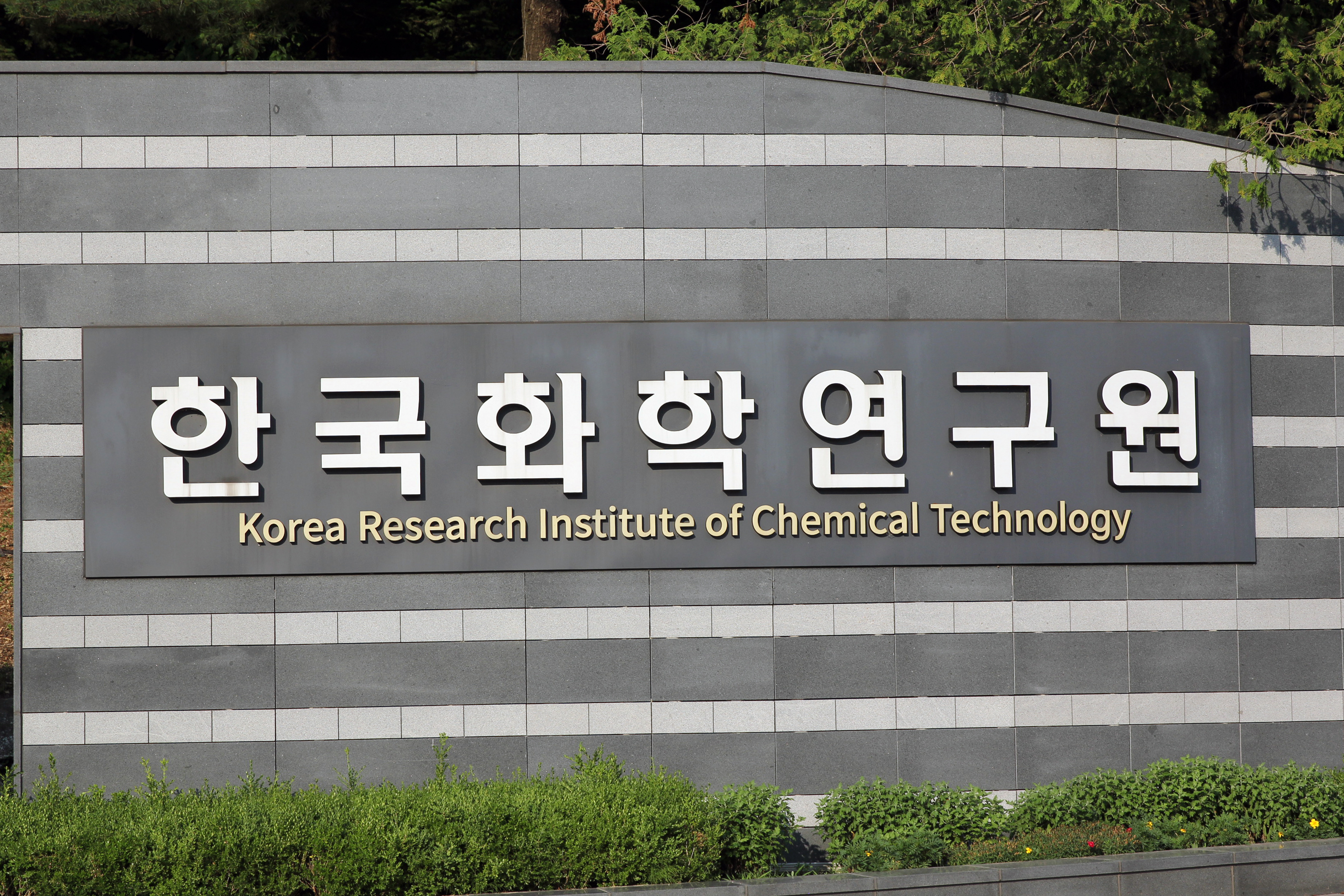
Sign by the entrance to Korea Research Institute of Chemical Technology

Korea Research Institute of Chemical Technology (KRICT) is the national chemical research institute for the Republic of Korea. It has performed research & development and public infrastructure services in chemistry and related convergence technologies. KRICT was established in 1976 and is a National Research Council of Science & Technology member. It is located at 141, Gajeong-ro, Yuseong-gu, Daejeon.

== Field of work ==
- Research and development of Eco-friendly chemical process technology research
- Research and development of chemical materials
- Research and development of new material creation
- Research and development of chemical-based convergence technology
- Establishment and operation of public infrastructure for chemical safety, analysis, evaluation, standardization, certification, and provision of compounds and information, etc.
- Research and development cooperation and technical service consignment with the government, private sector, corporations, and organizations
- Cooperation and support and technology commercialization with related industries such as small and medium-sized companies
- Cooperation and support with related industries such as small and medium-sized companies and technology commercialization
- Support for training professionals in the primary mission areas and establishing related technology policies
- Subsidiary projects under each subparagraph above and other projects necessary for achieving the goal of KRICT

== History ==
KRICT was established in September 1976. In January 1999 its affiliation changed to the Ministry of Science and Technology under the Office of the Prime Minister. In March 2000 it was an establishment of the Korea Chemical Bank, and in January 2001 the organization name was hanged to KRICT. The institute's affiliation changed again to the National Research Council of Science & Technology under the Ministry of Science, ICT and Future Planning (Currently Ministry of Science and ICT) In June 2014. Last affiliation changed to the National Research Council of Science & Technology under the Ministry of Science and ICTIn July 2017.

Further expansions of this institute include: Korea Institute of Toxicology as an annex of KRICT (In January 2002); KRICT-CNU, Graduate School of Drug Discovery and Development (In May 2011); New Chemical Commercialization Research Center in Ulsan (Currently Research Center for Advanced Specialty Chemicals) In March 2012; Biochemistry Commercialization Center in Ulsan (Currently Center for Bio-based Chemistry) In March 2016; Carbon Neutral Demo-Plant Center in Yeosu in December 2023

== Research ==
KRICT conducts research in chemical processes, advanced materials, pharmaceuticals and biotechnology, specialty and bio-based chemicals, and chemical data and infrastructure.

Its Chemical Process Research Division works on chemical production processes, hydrogen-related technologies, recycling and chemical conversion of plastics, and energy-efficient industrial processes.

The Advanced Materials Division develops materials for electronic devices, energy conversion and energy storage.

The Therapeutics and Biotechnology Division conducts research on drug development and technologies related to infectious and rare diseases.

The Specialty and Bio-based Chemicals Division researches fine chemicals, bio-based materials and bioplastics.

The Chemical Platform Technology Division operates research infrastructure including chemical databases, compound collections, analytical facilities and other services used by academic and industrial researchers.

KRICT also operates the Korea Chemical Bank, which collects and manages chemical compounds used in drug discovery research, and participates in graduate education through the UST-KRICT School.

== Activities ==
In addition to research and development, KRICT provides analytical, testing, standardization and chemical-safety infrastructure. It also conducts collaborative research with government agencies, universities and private-sector organizations and supports technology transfer and commercialization of research results.
