= Korean Society for Biochemistry and Molecular Biology =

Scientific society in South Korea

- Formation: August 7, 1967; 58 years ago
- Headquarters: New building, 22, Teheran-ro 7-gil, Gangnam-gu, Seoul
- President: Kim Young-Joon
- Website: www.ksbmb.or.kr

- Korean Society for Biochemistry and Molecular Biology
- Hangul: 생화학분자생물학회
- Hanja: 生化學分子生物學會
- Revised Romanization: Saenghwahak Bunja Saengmulhakhoe
- McCune–Reischauer: Saenghwahak Punja Saengmurhakhoe

The Korean Society for Biochemistry and Molecular Biology (KSBMB; Korean: 생화학분자생물학회) is a scholarly association of Korean biochemists and molecular biologists with approximately 15,000 members. It is a member of the Federation of Asia and Oceania Biochemists and Molecular Biologists (FAOBMB), International Union of Biochemistry and Molecular Biology (IUBMB), Korean Federation of Science and Technology Societies (KOFST), and Korean Academy of Medical Sciences (KAMS).

== Naming ==
The society was originally founded in 1948 under the name the Korean Biochemical Society. In 1995, the name changed to the Korean Society of Medical Biochemistry and Molecular Biology. In 2010, it merged with the Korean Society for Biochemistry and Molecular Biology (founded in 1967) and from then have used the name the Korean Society for Biochemistry and Molecular Biology.

== Journals ==
The society publishes Experimental & Molecular Medicine (EMM) and Biochemistry and Molecular Biology Reports (BMB Reports) annually, Webzine monthly, and KSBMB NEWS four times a year. Experimental and Molecular Medicine has been published under the Nature Publishing Group since 2013.

== Awards ==
The KSBMB gives out the Donghun Award, Moosa Award, Sasuk Award, DI Award, Chungsan Award, Macrogen Woman Scientist Award, BMB Reports Award & EMM Award, Dongcheon Young Scientist Award, Takara Award, and Young Scientist Award & New Drug Research Award.
