= Suh Pann-Ghill =

South Korean neuroscientist (born 1952)

PhD Suh Pann-Ghill
- 서판길
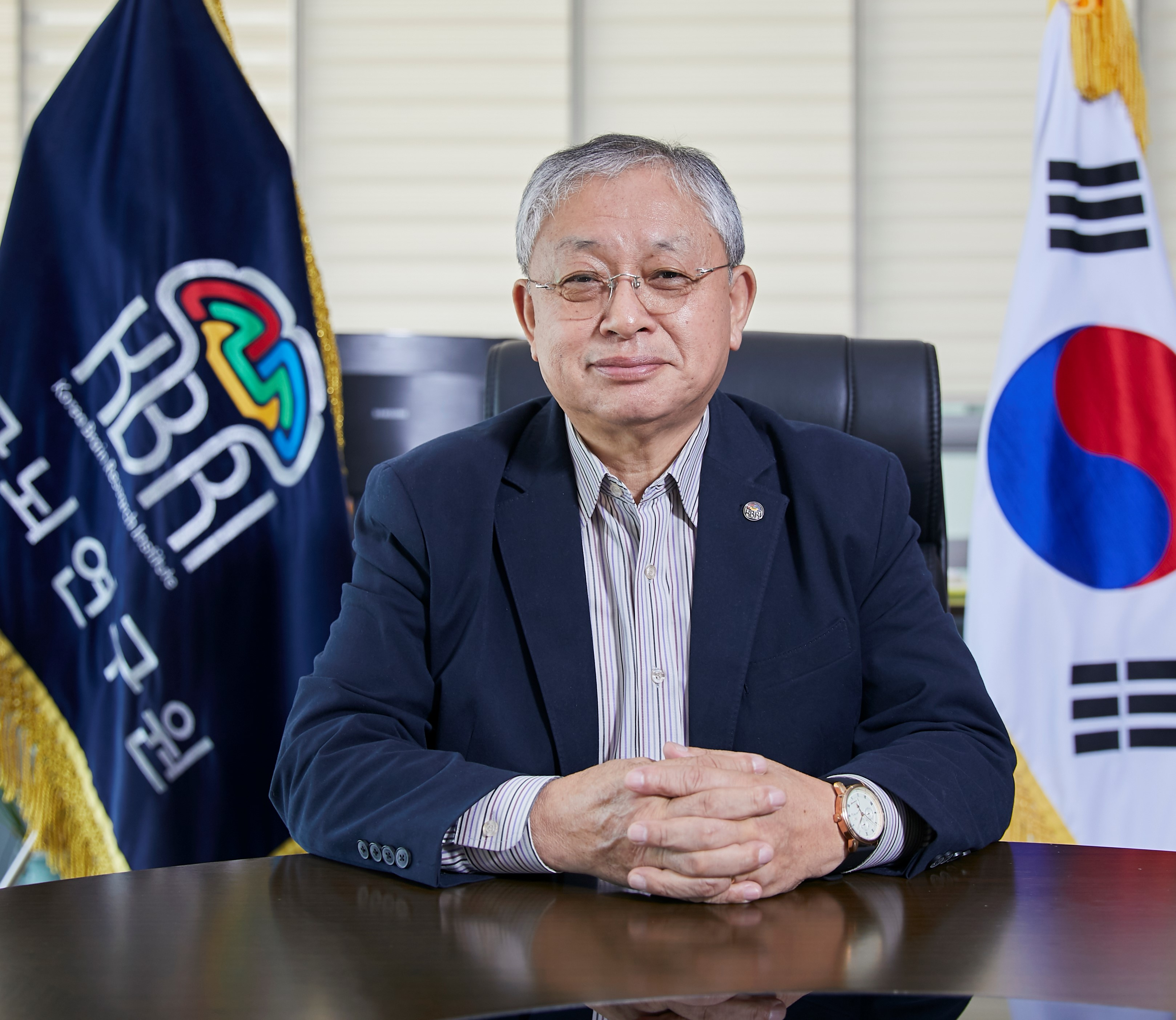
- Born: March 9, 1952
- Citizenship: South Korean
- Education: DVM, and Ph.D.
- Alma mater: Seoul National University
- Scientific career
- Institutions: Korea Brain Research Institute, UNIST, National Council of Basic Sciences & Technology in Korea, Korean University Council of Research and Industry Cooperation, POSTECH

Korean name
- Hangul: 서판길
- Hanja: 徐判吉
- RR: Seo Pangil
- MR: Sŏ P'an'gil

Suh Pann-Ghill (Korean: 서판길; born March 9, 1952) is a South Korean neuroscientist. He has served as a professor and vice president for research at UNIST and the third president of the Korea Brain Research Institute.

== Education ==
He is a Master of Science, Doctor of Veterinary Medicine, and Doctor of Philosophy in biochemistry from Seoul National University.

== Career ==
Suh performed his postdoc at the Lab of Cell Signaling of the National Institutes of Health. He then became a professor and chair of the Dept. of Life Science at POSTECH. He has also served as the president of the Korean University Council of Research and Industry Cooperation, chairman of the National Council of Basic Sciences & Technology in Korea, professor and vice president for research at UNIST, and president of the Korea Brain Research Institute. He has also served as a board member on the Institute for Basic Science board of trustees.

== Honors and awards ==
- 2020: Top Scientist and Technologist Award of Korea, Korean Federation of Science and Technology Societies
- 2017: Annual Top 5 Domestic Medical Scientific Achievements
- 2014: Asan Award in Medicine, Asan Foundation
- 2014: Gold Ribbon Award, Korean Society for Molecular and Cellular Biology
- 2013: Outstanding National R&D Performance, Ministry of Science, ICT and Future Planning
- 2011: Geunjeong Award, Ministry of Education, Science and Technology
- 2007: Scientist of the Month, National Research Foundation of Korea
- 2007: Commendation, Ministry of Education and Human Resources Development
- 2004: Commendation, Ministry of Health and Welfare
- 2001: Dongheon Biochemistry Award, Society of Biochemistry and Molecular Biology

== Selected publications ==
- Rhee, Sue Goo; Suh, Pann-Ghill; Ryu, Sung-Ho; Lee, Sang Yeol (5 May 1989). "Studies of inositol phospholipid-specific phospholipase C". Science. 244 (4904): 546–550. Bibcode:1989Sci...244..546R. doi:10.1126/science.2541501. PMID 2541501.
- Meisenhelder, Jill; Suh, Pann-Ghill; Rhee, Sue Goo; Tony, Hunter (30 June 1989). "Phospholipase C-γ is a substrate for the PDGF and EGF receptor protein-tyrosine kinases in vivo and in vitro". Cell. 57 (7): 1109–1122. doi:10.1016/0092-8674(89)90048-2. PMID 2472219.
- Suh, Pann-Ghill; Park, Jae-Il; Manzoli, Lucia; Cocco, Lucio; Peak, Joanna C.; Katan, Matilda; Fukami, Kiyoko; Kataoka, Tohru; Yun, Sang-Uk; Ryu, Sung-Ho (2008). "Multiple roles of phosphoinositide-specific phospholipase C isozymes". BMB Reports. 41 (6): 415–434. doi:10.5483/BMBRep.2008.41.6.415. hdl:11585/62661. PMID 18593525.

== See also ==
- Changjoon Justin Lee
- Alexei Verkhratsky
- Maiken Nedergaard
- Baljit S. Khakh
