= Yoon Bo-hyun =

South Korean gynecologist (born 1955)

Yoon Bo-hyun 윤보현
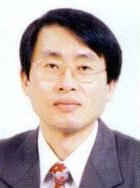
- Born: Seoul, South Korea
- Education: Seoul National University
- Medical career
- Field: Medicine
- Institutions: Seoul National University
- Sub-specialties: Prematurity and fetal damage (maternal fetal medicine)
- Awards: Top Scientist and Technologist Award of Korea (2012)

- Yoon Bo-hyun
- Hangul: 윤보현
- RR: Yun Bohyeon
- MR: Yun Pohyŏn

Yoon Bo-hyun (Korean: 윤보현) is a South Korean physician and scientist in the medical area of obstetrics and gynecology. He researches in the area of preterm births, intra-amniotic infection or inflammation and fetal damage. For his theoretical and clinical academic achievements he received the Top Scientist and Technologist Award of Korea in 2012.

== Education ==
Yoon was born in Seoul, South Korea and grew up there. He graduated from the medical college of Seoul National University in 1979, where he received his M.D. and Ph.D. After a residency in the department of obstetrics and gynecology at the same college he joined the faculty there from 1988 until the present.

== Work ==
Yoon's work focused on "intrauterine infection/inflammation, prematurity and fetal damage", which is one of the most important challenges to medicine. Cerebral palsy is a serious motor disorder which frequently appears in preterm newborn babies, and has been traditionally linked to hypoxic obstetric events. However, many studies demonstrated a limited role for birth hypoxia in the etiology of cerebral palsy.

From 1996, Yoon and his colleagues provided strong clinical and experimental evidence that intrauterine infection/inflammation, which is causally linked to preterm birth, plays an important role in the pathogenesis of fetal brain damage and cerebral palsy. Moreover, they demonstrated that intrauterine infection/inflammation is an important risk factor for the development of bronchopulmonary dysplasia which is one of the most frequent and significant complications of preterm newborns. These have important implications because the two most important complications of preterm newborns, cerebral palsy and bronchopulmonary dysplasia, seem to be initiated before birth in some, and can be prevented and treated from in utero.

Over the last twenty years, Yoon and his colleagues have published a number of important articles in the area of preterm births, intra-amniotic infection/inflammation and fetal damage. His papers have been cited extensively in the literature, making his H-index 60 as of September 2014. He invented MMP-8 bedside test which identifies intra-amniotic infection/inflammation in patients at risk for preterm birth.

He and his co-workers have applied the results of his investigation to clinical fields. For example, The outcomes of preterm neonates who were born in Seoul National University Hospital have been improved noticeably since they actively diagnosed and treated intrauterine infection with new regimen of antibiotics they developed.

== Awards ==
For his scientific achievement Yoon received the First Paper Prize Award of the Society for Maternal-Fetal Medicine (1993), the Gwanghye Prize from Korean Medical Association (1994), the Certificate of the Prize for Outstanding Thesis from the Korean Federation of Science and Technology Societies (1995), the Best Paper Award from the Korean Society for Obstetrics and Gynecology (1995), and the Award for Research Excellence of the International Society for Perinatal Obstetricians (1996).

He also achieved the Awards for Research Excellence of the Society for Maternal-Fetal Medicine (1999), the Best Researcher Award from the Seoul National University Hospital (1999), Namyang Academic Award from the Korean Society of Perinatology (2009), Bumsuk Prize from Bumsuk Academic Scholarship Foundation (2012), and the Top Scientist and Technologist Award of Korea (2012).

== See also ==
- Cerebral palsy
- Premature birth
- Periventricular leukomalacia
