= Top Scientist and Technologist Award of Korea =

Annual award in South Korea

- Awarded for: Scientists and engineers with outstanding achievements
- Country: South Korea
- Presented by: Korean Federation of Science and Technology Societies
- Reward: 300 million KRW
- First award: 2003
- Number of laureates: 47 as of 2024
- Website: Top Scientist and Technologist Award of Korea (Korean)

- Top Scientist and Technologist Award of Korea
- Hangul: 대한민국최고과학기술인상
- Hanja: 大韓民國最高科學技術人賞
- RR: Daehanminguk choego gwahak gisurinsang
- MR: Taehanmin'guk ch'oego kwahak kisurinsang

Top Scientist and Technologist Award of Korea (Korean: 대한민국최고과학기술인상) is one of two annual awards given in South Korea by the Korean Federation of Science and Technology Societies with the other being a government award for contribution to science and technology promotion. The Top Scientist and Technologist Award of Korea was started in 2003 as the successor to the Science and Technology Award of Korea which was established in 1968. The award is to foster honor and pride and create an environment in which people can focus on research and development by discovering and encouraging scientists and engineers with outstanding achievements who can represent South Korea. While previously given to multiple individuals, from 2003 only person is selected for each cycle. Laureates receive the award and 300 million KRW cash prize.

== Laureates ==
Year	Laureate	Institution
2003	Kim Kyu-won (김규원); Kim Jihn-eui (김진의)	Department of Pharmacy, Seoul National University; Department of Physics, Seoul National University
2004	Yun Deokyong (윤덕용); Hwang Woo-suk (황우석)	Department of Materials Science and Engineering, KAIST; Department of Veterinary Medicine, Seoul National University
2005	Shin Hee-Sup (신희섭); Lee Jaeyeong (이재영); Ryoo Ryong (유룡)	Neuroscience Center, Korea Institute of Science and Technology; Department of New Materials Engineering, KAIST; Department of Chemistry, KAIST
2006	Kim Sung-hoon (김성훈); Hwang Jun-Muk (황준묵); Hwang Changgyu (황창규)	College of Pharmacy, Seoul National University; School of Mathematics, Korea Institute for Advanced Study; Semiconductor Division, Samsung Electronics
2007	Kwon Ukhyeon (권욱현); Suh Jin-suck (서진석); Ihm Jisoon (임지순); Choe Jinho (최진호)	Department of Computer Engineering, Seoul National University; School of Medicine, Yonsei University; Department of Physics and Astronomy, Seoul National University; Department of Nanoscience, Ewha Womans University
2008	Kim Kimoon (김기문); Min Gyesik (민계식); Song Ho-young (송호영); Choi Yang-do (최양도)	Department of Chemistry, Pohang University of Science and Technology; HD Hyundai Heavy Industries; School of Medicine, University of Ulsan; Department of Agricultural and Biotechnology, Seoul National University
2009	Kang Seokjin (강석진); Suh Yoo-hun (서유헌); Lee Hyeonsun (이현순)	Department of Mathematical Sciences, Seoul National University; School of Medicine, Seoul National University; Research and Development, Hyundai-Kia Motors
2010	Kim Gwangsu (김광수); Oh Uhtaek (오우택); Han Min-goo (한민구)	Department of Chemistry, Pohang University of Science and Technology; College of Pharmacy, Seoul National University; Department of Electrical Engineering, Seoul National University
2011	Noh Tae-won (노태원); Park Seung-jung (박승정); Baek Giyeop (백기엽)	Department of Physics and Astronomy, Seoul National University; School of Medicine, University of Ulsan; Department of Horticultural Science, Chungbuk National University
2012	Shin Sung-chul (신성철); Yoon Bo-hyun (윤보현)	Daegu Gyeongbuk Institute of Science and Technology; School of Medicine, Seoul National University
2013	Kim V. Narry (김빛내리); Park Jong-il (박종일)	Department of Life Sciences, Seoul National University; Department of Mathematical Sciences, Seoul National University
2014	Kwon Oh-hyun (권오현); Lee Kimyeong (이기명)	Samsung Electronics; School of Physics, Korea Institute for Advanced Study
2015	Lee Yong-hui (이용희); Jeong Yonghwan (정용환)	Department of Physics, Korea Advanced Institute of Science and Technology; Nuclear Materials Technology Development Group, Korea Atomic Energy Research Institute
2016	Kwon Ojun (권오준); Hyeon Taeghwan (현택환)	POSCO; Department of Chemical and Biological Engineering, Seoul National University
2017	Lee Sangyeop (이상엽); Hwang Gyuyeong (황규영)	Department of Biological and Chemical Engineering, KAIST; Department of Computer Science, KAIST
2018	Kaang Bong-Kiun (강봉균); Bak Jinsu (박진수)	Department of Life Sciences, Seoul National University; LG Electronics
2019	Kim Ki-nam (김기남); Chang Sukbok (장석복)	Samsung Electronics; Department of Chemistry, KAIST
2020	Suh Pann-Ghill (서판길)	Korea Brain Research Institute
2021	Kwon Ogyeong (권오경)	Department of Convergence Electronic Engineering, Hanyang University
2022	Seon Yangguk (선양국)	Department of Energy Engineering, Hanyang University
2023	Koh Gou Young (고규영)	Graduate School of Medical Sciences, KAIST & Vascular Research Center, Institute for Basic Science
2024	Nam-Gyu Park (박남규)	Professor of School of Chemical Engineering, Sungkyunkwan University
2025	Hwang Cheol-Seong (황철성)	Materials Science and Engineering, Seoul National University
2026	Cheon Jinwoo (천진우)	Center for Nanomedicine within the Institute for Basic Science and Underwood Distinguished Professor at Yonsei University

== See also ==
- National Scientist of the Republic of Korea
- List of general science and technology awards
- Highest Science and Technology Award
