= Chiral oligoethylene glycol =

Class of organocatalyst of organic chemistry field

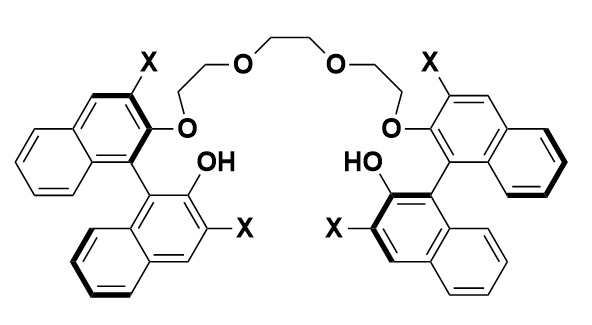
Structure of a common class of BINOL-derived chiral oligoethylene glycols. Catalysts of this type are also known as Song’s chiral oligoEG catalysts (after Choong Eui Song). Common examples of X include X = I, CF_{3}).

Chiral oligoethylene glycols are oligoethylene glycols that have BINOL-based chiral backbones. These compounds are used in asymmetric catalysis as multifunctional chiral cation-binding catalysts. These compounds are also known as chiral anion generators.
