= Suh Yoo-hun =

South Korean neuroscientist (born 1948)

Suh Yoo-hun 서유헌
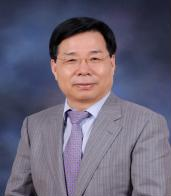
- Born: February 8, 1948 (age 78); Seoul, South Korea
- Education: Seoul National University
- Known for: Alzheimer's Disease and Parkinson's Disease
- Awards: National Government Medal (2002, 2013); Top Scientist and Technologist Award of Korea (2009); 5.16 National Prize (2004); Sejong Prize (1997); One of 21 outstanding Korean scholars of the 21st century
- Scientific career
- Fields: Neuroscience
- Workplaces: Korea Brain Research Institute
- Doctoral advisor: Park Chang-woong

- Suh Yoo-hun
- Hangul: 서유헌
- RR: Seo Yuheon
- MR: Sŏ Yuhŏn

Suh Yoo-hun (Korean: 서유헌; born February 8, 1948) is a South Korean neuroscientist. His researches focus on neurodegeneration, especially on the discovery of genes and therapies for Alzheimer's disease and Parkinson's disease.

== Education and work ==
Suh Yoo-hun was born in Seoul. He obtained his MD in 1973 and his PhD in medicine and pharmacology in 1981, both degrees at the college of medicine in Seoul National University. He was professor at Seoul National University. He was the first president of Korean Brain Research Institute. In 2013 he received the National Government Medal for his academic achievements.

== Research ==
Suh first cloned the gene for epinephrine synthesizing enzyme, PNMT and has greatly contributed to the discovery of a new potential gene and factors for Alzheimer's disease, and the development of potential drugs and stem cell therapy for Alzheimer's disease and Parkinson's disease. Among his works of scholarship Suh has research papers (over 200 including over 120 SCIs) and patents (7 Korean intellectual properties, 2 American intellectual properties, and 1 Japanese intellectual property).

== Academic activities ==
Suh Yoo-hun is member of Korean National Academy of Science and Technology and a member of Korean National Academy of Medicine. He is also a member of the board of trustees of Human Frontier Science Program, a member of International Scientific Advisory Board of AD&PD as well as a member of International Scientific Advisory Board of International Conference on Alzheimer's Disease and related disorders.

He is an editor for six SCI journals (Journal of Pharmacological Sciences, Journal of Neurochemistry, Journal of Molecular Neuroscience, Journal of Neuroscience Research, Neurochemical Research and Neuroscience Research).

Suh is a council member of the Federation of Asia-Oceania Neuroscience Societies (FAONS), APRC (Asia-pacific Regional Committee) of IBRO, and Asian Pacific Neurochemistry. He was the president of Korean Mind, Brain and Education Society, a professor and chairman of the department of pharmacology and college of medicine at Seoul National University, a director of National Creative Research Initiatives Center for Alzheimer's Disease, a director of Neuroscience Res. Institute, MRC, Seoul National University, and a director of Cognitive Science Institute, Seoul National University.

Suh also was a member of the Korean National Science and Technology council. Furthermore, He was a chairman for the local organizing committee of the 22nd Biennial Joint Meeting of the International Society for Neurochemistry and the Asian Pacific Society for Neurochemistry in Busan. As the president, he demonstrated his ability to promote the foundation of Korea Brain Research Institute.

From 2002 to 2003, Suh was the president of Korea Society for Cognitive Science. He was a member of Institutional Review Board of Seoul National University. In addition, from 1997 to 1999, he was the founding president of Korea Brain Association and a dean of the medical college at Kangwon National University. From 2000 to 2003, he was the president of Korean Society for Brain and Neural Science. From 2001 to 2002, he was the president of Korean Society of Pharmacology. From 2000 to 2003, he was the president of Biomedical Brain Research Center, NIH in Korea. From 1996 to 1998, he was the president of Asian Pacific Society for Neurochemistry. From 2007 to 2009, he has been the founding president and a council member of The Korean Society for Neurode Generative Disease. From 2009 to 2010, he had worked as the chairman of search committee for the establishment of department of brain science of Daegu Gyeongbuk Institute of Science and Technology.

Since June 2011, Suh Yoo-hun has been a council member of National Biotechnology Policy Council. Suh is appointed as an associate editor for Journal of Pharmacological Sciences from 2011. He was appointed to the editorial board member for both Neurochemical Research and Neuroscience Research in 2002. He is a handling editor for Journal of Neurochemistry from 1995. He has been an editorial board member for Journal of Molecular Neuroscience since 1999, and for Journal of Neuroscience Research since 1998 and since 2013 an associate editor for Journal of Neuroscience Research.

== Awards ==
Suh Yoo-hun received several academic awards for his academic achievements. He received the Top Scientist and Technologist Award of Korea in 2009 and the National Government Medal (Okjo Medal) in 2013. In 2008, he won SNU Excellent Research Award and Hosup Shim Medical Award and the Excellent SCI Award in 2007. He was awarded the Scientist of the Month by the Ministry of Science and ICT and National Research Foundation of Korea in 2007.

In 2004, Suh won the 5∙16 National Prize and Eui Dang Medical Award. In 2002 he was selected as one of 20 outstanding Korean Medical Scientists and won the National Government Medal (Woongbie Medal) and the Yuhan Grand Prize. Moreover, in 2001 he was selected as one of 21 outstanding Korean Scholars of the 21st century.

In 1997, he won the Sejong Prize and Korean Scientific Authorship Award. In 1995 he won the Kwanghae Awards, and in 1991 he won the Yuhan Prize and Korean Science Excellence Award.
