= MMP-8 =

MMP-8 may refer to:

- Microbial collagenase, an enzyme
- Neutrophil collagenase, an enzyme
