= Shin Sung-chul =

South Korean physicist (born 1952)

Shin Sung-chul 신성철
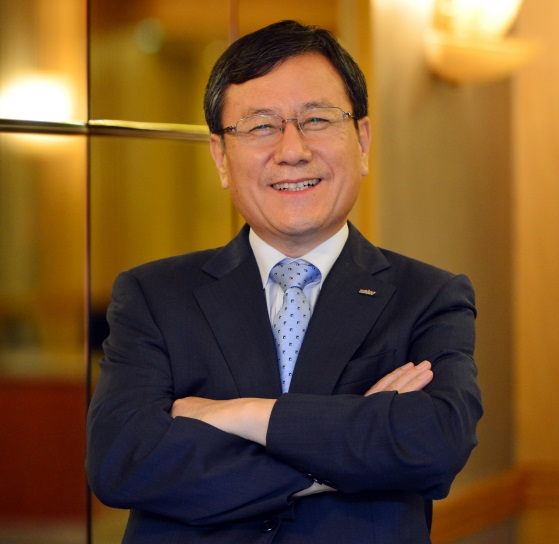
- Born: July 19, 1952 (age 74); Daejeon, South Korea
- Education: Seoul National University; KAIST; Northwestern University
- Awards: Top Scientist and Technologist Award of Korea, South Korea (2012) Science Award, National Academy of Sciences, South Korea (2009); Fellow, American Physics Society (2009) Fellow, Korean Academy of Science and Technology (2000)
- Scientific career
- Fields: Spintronics, nanomagnetism
- Workplaces: KAIST

Korean name
- Hangul: 신성철
- RR: Sin Seongcheol
- MR: Sin Sŏngch'ŏl

Shin Sung-chul (Korean: 신성철; born July 19, 1952) is a South Korean physicist and the 16th president of KAIST. Shin was the first president of DGIST since it changed its form from a research institute to a university in 2011. His main research areas as a scientist are spintronics and nanomagnetism. As of June 2014, Shin is the founding president of DGIST university, Fellow Professor of University of Ulsan, a member of Presidential Advisory Council on Science & Technology (PACST), the chair of Committee for Future Strategy, PACST, and a Fellow of the American Physical Society (APS).

== Education ==
Shin received a B.S. degree in 1975 at Seoul National University in applied physics, and an M.S. degree in 1977 from KAIST, where he studied condensed matter physics. He then carried out research Korea Research Institute of Standards and Science until 1980, at which point he went to the United States, where he received a Ph.D. in 1984 in materials physics at Northwestern University.

== Academic Experiences ==
After Shin received his Ph.D. degree, he joined Eastman Kodak's Research Lab as a senior researcher and carried out research till 1989. At that time, the South Korean government urged scientists abroad to come back to South Korea and contribute to the development of national science and technology and nurturing young scientists and engineers.

In response, Shin went to South Korea and joined KAIST in 1989 as an assistant professor in the department of physics. In 2009, Shin became a chair professor of KAIST. During 22 years in KAIST, he held various academic positions. He had a role as a founding director of the Korea Institute for Advance Study (1996), director of Center for Nanospinics of Spintronic Materials (1998–2005), founding director of Institute of Nano Science & Technology (2001~2003) in KAIST. He also has held various academic positions of many other organizations. A fellow in the American Physical Society (APS) since 2008, he was the president of the Korean Physical Society from 2011 to 2012 and the Korean Magnetics Society from 2009 to 2010. He also served as chairman of the International Conference on Magnetism (ICM2012) and has been on the editorial board of J. Magnetism and Magnetic Materials from 2009.

An accomplished scholar in the field of nanoscience, Shin's research focuses on the artificial synthesis and characterization of magnetic materials, magnetic anisotropy, and magneto-optical phenomena. Especially, he played a pioneering role in the research of nanospinics, working as the founding director of the Center for Nanospinics of Spintronic Materials from 1998 to 2005 and the Institute of Nanoscience and Technology from 2001 to 2003 at KAIST. He currently leads the Laboratory for Nanospinics of Spintronic Materials at KAIST. He is author of over 310 journal papers while holding 37 patents, delivered 160 international and national invited academic talks, and has supervised more than 80 MS, Ph.D., and postdoctoral scholars.

== Other Experiences ==
In addition to academic positions, Shin has held various administrative positions, made contributions in promoting science and technology and provided advice on science and technology policy to the government. He served as vice-dean of student affairs, director of International Cooperation Division, and dean of planning as well as vice president (2004–2005) in KAIST. He also served as a board member of Expo Science Park, a president of Daedeok Club (Opinion Leaders' Club for Science and Technology in Daeduck Science Town) (2002–2008), emceed a science program broadcast by KBS, a major Korean television broadcasting network, provided advice on science policy to the government, including Ministry of Science and Technology and Ministry of Science, ICT and Future Planning. Shin was appointed as a member of PACST (Presidential Advisory Council on Science & Technology). The role of PACST is to provide advice and consultations to the president of South Korea on issues related to science and technology. Shin also served as the chair of Committee for Future Strategy, PACST. He has served on the board of the Agency for Defense Development since 2014. He also has been serving as a board member of the Center for the 4IR Global Network Advisory at the World Economic Forum since 2018.

The South Korean government founded Daegu Gyeongbuk Institute of Science and Technology (DGIST) as a research institute in 2004 and changed the related law to allow DGIST offer degree programs in 2008. Therefore, DGIST changed its system from a research institute to a university and opened graduate program in March 2011. The South Korean government appointed Shin as the founding president of this new university. He led DGIST for six years, starting from 2011. As the founding president of the newly-established institute, he drove innovative initiatives to establish DGIST as one of the nation's leading research universities.

Professor Sung-Chul Shin is the 16th president of KAIST. President Shin is also the first alumnus to serve as the president of KAIST. He is committed to multidisciplinary education, convergence research, and globalization, pursuing initiatives to encourage innovation and entrepreneurship.

== Honors and awards ==
- 2019: Distinguished Career Achievement Award, Northwestern University
- 2016: Asian Union of Magnetics Societies Award
- 2015: Korean Economy Leader Award (in the field of innovative management)
- 2012: Top Scientist and Technologist Award of Korea (conferred by president of Korea, Korean Federation of Science and Technology Societies (ko))
- 2012: Korean Economy Leader Award (in the field of Global Management), JoongAng Ilbo
- 2011: Alumni of the Year, KAIST Alumni Association
- 2011: KAIST Award (in the field of international cooperation), KAIST
- 2009: Science Award, National Academy of Sciences of the Republic of Korea
- 2008: Fellow, American Physics Society
- 2007: Order of Science and Technology Merit Changjo Medal (Grade 1) (conferred by the President of South Korea)
- 2007: Appointment as a 'Role-model Scientist' by the Ministry of Education, Science and Technology
- 2006: Science Award, Korean Physical Society
- 2005: Recognized as one of the Korean Distinguished Basic Research Top 30 by Korea Research Foundation
- 2000: Fellow, Korean Academy of Science and Technology
- 1999: Scientist of the Month, Ministry of Science and Technology

== See also ==
- Kuk Young - 4th president of DGIST University
