= Lee Kunwoo =

South Korean engineer (born 1955)

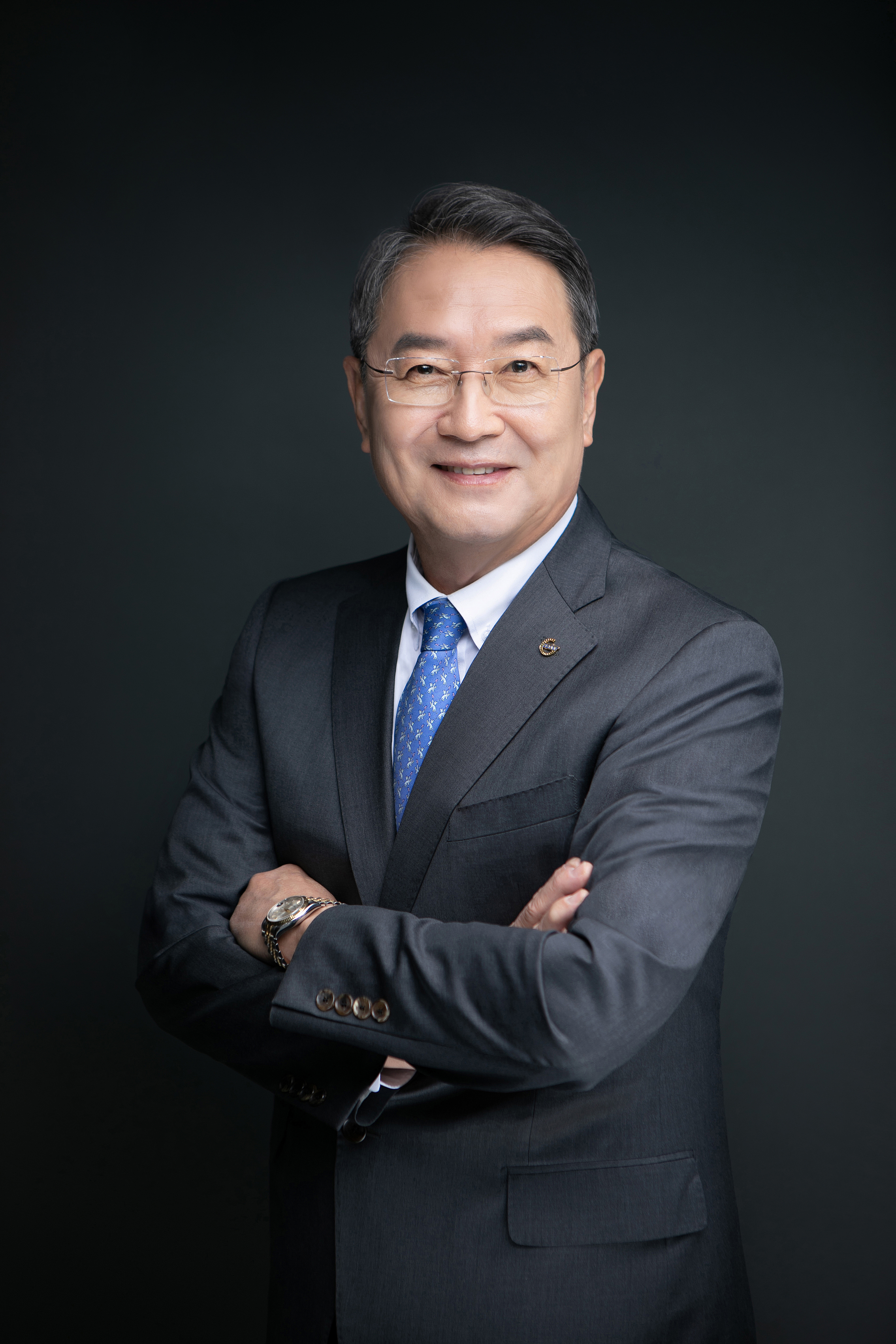

5th President of Daegu Gyeongbuk Institute of Science and Technology
- Incumbent
- Assumed office December 2023
- Preceded by: Kuk Young

Personal details
- Born: December 11, 1955 (age 70)
- Education: Seoul National University; Massachusetts Institute of Technology
- Occupation: Mechanical engineer, Academic administrator

Korean name
- Hangul: 이건우
- Hanja: 李建雨
- RR: I Geonu
- MR: I Kŏnu

Lee Kunwoo (Korean: 이건우; born December 11, 1955) is a South Korean Doctor of Engineering. Since his retirement as a professor in March 2021, he has served as Professor Emeritus in the Department of Mechanical Engineering at Seoul National University's College of Engineering. He is the 5th President of DGIST.

== Life and Education ==
Lee was born in Seoul in 1955. He earned a bachelor's degree in mechanical engineering from the College of Engineering at Seoul National University in 1978. He subsequently pursued graduate studies at the Massachusetts Institute of Technology (MIT), where he received a master's degree in mechanical engineering in 1981 and a doctorate in 1984.

== Career ==
From 2004 to 2014, Lee served as co-editor-in-chief of Computer-Aided Design of Elsevier, and editor-in-chief of the Journal of Computational Design and Engineering of Oxford Press since 2014. He was the founding president of Advanced Institute of Convergence Technology of Seoul National University from 2004 to 2009, the Dean of the College of Engineering of Seoul National University from 2013 to 2017, and the founding Dean of the Graduate School of Engineering Practice of Seoul National University from 2016 to 2017. Lee served as Vice President of the National Academy of Engineering of Korea from 2015 to 2020. Currently, he is a member of the Korean Academy of Science and Technology and a fellow of the American Society of Mechanical Engineers. He was the president of the Korean Society of Mechanical Engineers in 2013 and the Korean Society for Engineering Education from 2017 to 2018.

Since 2023, Lee has served as the fifth president of the Daegu Gyeongbuk Institute of Science and Technology (DGIST).

As president of DGIST, Lee served as one of the hosts of the World Engineering Education Forum and Global Engineering Deans Council (WEEF & GEDC) 2025, held from September 21 to 25, 2025, at the Daegu EXCO convention center and the DGIST campus. The event, co-hosted by the Korean Society for Engineering Education (KSEE), brought together approximately 800 participants under the theme “Engineering Education We Need.”

Professional Career
Year	Career
Dec 2023 ~	5th President of DGIST
Mar 2021 ~ current	Professor Emeritus, Department of Mechanical Engineering, Seoul National University
Jan 2014 ~ current	Current Chair of Editorial Board of JCDE published by Oxford Press
Sep 2013 ~ current	current Fellow, American Society of Mechanical Engineers (ASME)
Mar 2016 ~ Mar 2018	Chairperson, Special Committee for Innovation in the College of Engineering, National Science and Technology Council(NSTC)
Mar 2016 ~ Aug 2017	1st President, Graduate School of Engineering Practice, Seoul National University
Sep 2013 ~ Aug 2017	Dean, College of Engineering, Seoul National University
Mar 1986 ~ Feb 2020	Professor, Department of Mechanical Engineering, Seoul National University

== Awards and honors ==
- 2024: Korea’s Engineer of Year, Korean Federation of Mechanical Engineering Societies
- 2021: National Academy of Sciences Award, National Academy of Sciences of the Republic of Korea
- 2018: Creative Award (Grade 1), Ministry of Science and ICT
- 2014: Editor Emeritus Award, Elsevier
- 2008: D&S Achievement Award, Japan Society of Mechanical Engineers
- 2006: Kyung-Ahm Prize, Kyung-Ahm Education & Culture Foundation
- 2004: NAEK Award, National Academy of Engineering of Korea

== Research interests ==
His research interests include CAD system supporting multi-resolution modeling, custom tailoring systems for shoes and wigs, dental CAD system, 3D printers, and integrated framework called human-centered CAD system in which products can be designed based on simultaneous simulation of products and human operator. He established two start-ups, one in Korea and the other in the US.

He is the author of the book, “Principles of CAD/CAM/CAE Systems”, published by Addison-Wesley in 1999. More than 10,000 copies have been sold. His papers and patents were cited 7,354 times.
