= Scientist of the Month =

South Korean science award

- Country: South Korea
- Presented by: Ministry of Science and ICT, National Research Foundation of Korea, Sedaily
- First award: 1997
- Website: Award website (Korean)

Korean name
- Hangul: 이달의 과학기술인상
- Hanja: 이달의 科學技術人賞
- RR: Idarui gwahak gisurinsang
- MR: Idarŭi kwahak kisurinsang

Scientist of the Month (Korean: 이달의 과학기술인상) is a South Korean national award presented to Koreans and Korean diaspora. The award is hosted by the Ministry of Science and ICT, National Research Foundation of Korea, and the newspaper Sedaily. The first award was given in 1997 and is given to one individual monthly along with a certificate from the Ministry and a prize of KRW 10 million. In addition to the ethnicity requirement, nominees must be actively engaged in R&D at a South Korean university, public research institute or industry. Laureates of the Top Scientist and Technologist Award of Korea, Korea Science Award, Korea Engineering Award, and previous Scientists of the Month are ineligible. Recipients of the Young Scientist Award and Woman Scientist/Engineer of the Year Award are only eligible if they have made significant contributions over a three-year period.

== Laureates ==
Year	Month	Name	Affiliation	Field	Citation
1997
1997	April	Lee Jongmin (이종민)	Korea Atomic Energy Research Institute	Nuclear power	Development of laser spectroscopy technology for nuclear power
1997	May	Kim Chunchu (김춘추)	Catholic University of Korea, Medical School	Medicine	Establishment of bone marrow transplantation technology for patients with incurable hematological malignancies
1997	June	Jeong Suwon (정수원)	Weltech	Naval architecture and ocean engineering	Research and development of welding and automated manufacturing methods in the shipbuilding industry
1997	July	Jo Sunhaeng (조순행)	Korea Institute of Energy Research, Separation Process Research Center	Chemical engineering	Development of a new energy-saving pressure adsorption gas separation process
1997	August	Lee Cheolhun (이철훈)	Hanyang University, Medical School	Human genetics	Development of a new, non-toxic substance that kills Legionella bacteria
1997	September	Yang Hyeonseung (양현승)	KAIST	Electronics and computer science	Development of intelligent mobile robots
1997	October	Lee Gyeonggwang (이경광)	Korea Research Institute of Bioscience and Biotechnology, Regenerative Medicine Research Center	Agriculture	Development of transgenic dairy cows that mass-produce lactoferrin
1997	November	Bak Yongsu (박용수)	Yonsei University, College of Engineering	Metallurgical engineering	Development and commercialization of ultra-corrosion-resistant super stainless steel
1997	December	Woo Jongsu (우종수)	Hanmi Pharm, Central Research Institute, Formulation Research Center	Pharmacology	First domestic development of the immunosuppressant cyclosporine
1998	January	Bak Jongcheol (박종철)	Korea Research Institute of Standards and Science, Quantum Physics Lab	Superconductor physics	Development of high-temperature superconducting materials
1998	February	Yun Inseop (윤인섭)	Seoul National University, College of Engineering	Chemical and biological engineering	Development of a dynamic simulator for chemical plant operations called MOSA
1998	March	Doh Muhoe (도무회)	Onbio	Agrochemistry	Domestic production of high-purity polydextrose
1998	April	Jeong Ilnam (정일남)	Korea Institute of Science and Technology	Materials	Improving academic achievements and domestic research levels in silicon chemistry
1998	May	Hwang Gyuyeong (황규영)	KAIST	Computer science	Development and commercialization of object-oriented multimedia 'Odysseus'
1998	June	Kim Juhan (김주한)	Turbotech Technology Research Institute Co., Ltd.	Electrical and electronic engineering	Development of CNC controller devices for machine tool lathes and milling machines
1998	July	Yu Seongeun (유성은)	Korea Research Institute of Chemical Technology, Bio-Function Modulating Substance Development Center	Chemistry	The first domestic development and commercialization of two new antihypertensive drugs
1998	August	Lee Jinsu (이진수)	Pohang University of Science and Technology	Electrical and electronic engineering	The world's first development of thick plate control and detection technology for the steel industry.
1998	September	Lee Jeongseon (이정선)	Hyundai Motor Company, Product Development Research Institute	Ulsan engine design	Independent development of a gasoline engine for light vehicles under 1,000 cc
1998	October	Bae Gyujin (배규진)	Korea Institute of Civil Engineering and Building Technology	Civil engineering	New technologies in tunneling technology. Development of new construction methods.
1998	November	Jeong Jechang (정제창)	Hanyang University, College of Engineering	Electrical and computer engineering	Development of element technologies adopted in the MPEG2 international standard
1998	December	Yun Jongeun (윤종은)	Mando Air Conditioning Co., Ltd., Winia Business Division	Mechanical engineering	Development of the world's first kimchi fermentation and storage technology
1999	January	Kang Seonggyu (강성규)	Korea Institute of Energy Research, Senior Research Department	Fluid engineering	Development of a waste gas circulation catalytic combustion dryer
1999	February	Kang Heon (강헌)	Seoul National University, College of Natural Sciences	Chemistry	Surface analysis using Cs+
1999	March	Lee Seungho (이승호)	Virtual Media	Computer science	Commercialization of groupware HandyOffice
1999	April	Kim Huiyeong (김희영)	Korea Research Institute of Chemical Technology, Microwave Chemical Technology Research Team	Chemical engineering	Development of a polycrystalline silicon manufacturing process for semiconductors
1999	May	Hwang Woo-suk (황우석)	Seoul National University, College of Veterinary Medicine	Veterinary medicine	Production of high-performance dairy cow clones using somatic cell nuclear transfer
1999	June	Lee Hyeongu (이형우)	Midas IT Co., Ltd.	Mechanical design	Development of a program for structural analysis and optimal design in the civil engineering and architectural fields.
1999	July	Kim Dongho (김동호)	Yonsei University, College of Science	Chemistry	Clarification of ultrafast phenomena using ultrashort pulse lasers
1999	August	Kim Hyeongmin (김형민)	Wonkwang University, College of Pharmacy	Oriental medicine	Elucidating the Role of Mast Cell Transforming Factor in Allergic Reactions
1999	September	Song Wonpyo (송원표)	Hyosung Heavy Industries, Changwon Branch, Power Team, Circuit Breaker Division	Electrical engineering	Development of a 765kVA ultra-high-voltage, large-capacity gas-insulated switchgear
1999	October	Kim Gukheon (김국헌)	KAIST	Electrical engineering	Development of generator excitation systems for thermal and nuclear power plants
1999	November	Shin Sung-chul (신성철)	KAIST	Physics	Development of a new high-density information storage nanomagnetic multilayer thin film material
1999	December	Kim Daegi (김대기)	IntoGen Co., Ltd.	Pharmacology	Development of Sunpla, a third-generation platinum-based anticancer drug
2000	January	Lee Young-wook (astronomer) (이영욱)	Yonsei University, College of Science	Astronomy and space science	Elucidating the formation and evolution of our galaxy
2000	February	Oh Taegwang (오태광)	Korea Research Institute of Bioscience and Biotechnology, Microbial Genome Research Lab	Microbial enzymes	Development of a new enzyme, "phytase," to prevent environmental pollution.
2000	March	Lee Giwon (이기원)	Samsung Electronics, CTO Strategy Office	Electrical engineering	System-on-chip ASIC-based technology development
2000	April	Bak Yonggi (박용기)	Korea Research Institute of Standards and Science, Electromagnetic Standards Department, Superconductivity Group	Materials engineering	Development of a magnetocardiographic measurement device using a superconducting SQUID
2000	May	Noh Tae-won (노태원)	Seoul National University, College of Natural Sciences	Physics and astronomy	Development of new material thin films for F-RAM
2000	June	Hong Changyong (홍창용)	LG Chemical Research Institute, Department of Life Sciences, New Drug Research Institute	Organic chemistry	Development of the world's first next-generation antibiotic, 'Factive'
2000	July	Bak Nosang (박노상)	Korea Research Institute of Chemical Technology, Medicinal Chemistry Center	Chemistry	Research and development of non-narcotic analgesics
2000	August	Kim Kimoon (김기문)	Pohang University of Science and Technology	Advanced materials science	Development of chiral porous crystal materials
2000	September	Oh Junnam (오준남)	Mando Central Research Institute	Electronic engineering	Development of electronically controlled brake device
2000	October	Kim Eungyu (김은규)	Korea Institute of Science and Technology, Systems Research Department	Semiconductor physics	Development of semiconductor quantum devices and single-electron transistors
2000	November	Nam Hong Gil (남홍길)	Pohang University of Science and Technology	Convergence biotechnology	Isolation and characterization of photoperiodic flowering-time regulation genes
2000	December	Kim Jongmin (김종민)	Samsung Advanced Institute of Technology, Electron Emitter Research Group	Electrical engineering	Development of large-area digital imaging devices using electron-emitting devices
2001	January	Baek Yeongjun (백영준)	Korea Institute of Science and Technology, Future Technology Research Center	Materials engineering	Diamond wafer synthesis technology using direct current plasma
2001	February	Ryu Hanil (류한일)	Seoul National University, College of Engineering	Materials engineering	Discovery of a new zero-thermoelectric ceramic material
2001	March	Lee Sangyeop (이상엽)	KAIST	Biochemical engineering	Development of production technology for optically pure precision chemicals
2001	April	Lee Hyeoncheol (이현철)	Yonsei University, College of Medicine, Department of Internal Medicine	Diabetology	Development of diabetes gene therapy
2001	May	Lee Jonguk (이종욱)	Yuhan Corporation Central Research Institute	Pharmacology	Development of a new gastric ulcer treatment drug, YH1885
2001	June	Mun Daewon (문대원)	Korea Research Institute of Standards and Science, Nanosurface Group	Surface chemistry	Development of ultra-thin film interface precision analysis technology
2001	July	Kim Naksan (김낙산)	Hyundai Motor Company, Research and Development Headquarters, Passenger Diesel Engine Design Team	Mechanical design	Development of ultra-low-emission, low-fuel-efficiency passenger diesel engines
2001	August	Ryoo Ryong (유룡)	KAIST	Chemistry	Synthesis and structural determination of mesoporous silica crystals
2001	September	Ryu Seongeon (류성언)	Korea Research Institute of Bioscience and Biotechnology, Cell Switch Protein Structure Research Group	Chemistry	Identification of the mechanism of cellular function switching by reactive oxygen species
2001	October	Kang Yongsu (강용수)	Korea Institute of Science and Technology, Facilitated Transport Membrane Research Group	Chemical engineering	Development of an environmentally friendly, energy-saving membrane
2001	November	Oh Byeongha (오병하)	KAIST	Life sciences	Elucidating the mechanism by which Helicobacter pylori survives in the stomach
2001	December	Gu Bongyeong (구본경)	Mando Central Research Institute, Brake System Team	Electronic engineering	Development of a driving force control device for automobiles
2002	January	Song Choong Eui (송충의)	Korea Institute of Science and Technology, Department of Biosciences	Chemistry	Technology for manufacturing clean optically active compounds using ionic liquids
2002	February	Lee Seong-ik (이성익)	Pohang University of Science and Technology	Physics	Development of diboride magnesium superconducting thin films
2002	March	Bak Chungmo (박충모)	Kumho Life Insurance Environmental Science Research Institute	Biological sciences	Clarification of the principles of light-induced plant growth regulation
2002	April	Kang Daeim (강대임)	Korea Research Institute of Standards and Science, Material Standards Department, Nanosurface Group	Mechanical engineering	Development of absolute evaluation technology for force standard accuracy
2002	May	Nam Chang-hee (남창희)	KAIST	Physics	Coherent X-ray generation using femtosecond terawatt lasers
2002	June	Lee Wonho (이원호)	LG Chemical Research Institute, Polymer Research Institute, Chemical Process Group	Chemical engineering	Commercialization of acrylic acid manufacturing catalyst
2002	July	Kim Daejun (김대준)	Sejong University, College of Engineering	New materials engineering	Development of zirconia bioceramics
2002	August	Hyeon Taeghwan (현택환)	Seoul National University	Chemical and biological engineering	Development of a mass production technology for uniform, highly crystalline magnetic nanoparticles without size separation
2002	September	Hahn Okhui (한옥희)	Korea Basic Science Institute, Daegu Center, Solid Sample Analysis Team	Chemistry	Development of a method for determining the location of substitutional elements using solid-state nuclear magnetic resonance
2002	October	Bak Cheonhong (박천홍)	Korea Institute of Machinery and Materials, Intelligent Precision Machinery Research Department	Mechanical engineering	Development of technology to improve the motion precision of a stage for ultra-precision positioning
2002	November	Bae Seokcheol (배석철)	Chungbuk National University, Medical School	Gene expression biochemistry	Discovery of a gastric cancer suppressor gene
2002	December	Je Jeongho (제정호)	Pohang University of Science and Technology, Department of Materials Science and Engineering, X-ray Imaging Research Group	Materials engineering	Development of high-resolution and real-time X-ray fluoroscopy microradiology technology
2003	January	Kim Jaehui (김재희)	Korea Atomic Energy Research Institute, Intelligent Systems Research Lab	Production engineering	Development of new automatic nuclear reactor detection technology
2003	February	Kim Kyu-won (김규원)	Seoul National University	Molecular medicine and biopharmaceuticals	Identification of a novel structural modification and degradation mechanism of an angiogenesis-regulating protein
2003	March	Kim Hyeongju (김형주)	Korea Biosystems, Corporate Research Institute	Biotechnology	Development of a BOD measuring device using a mediator-free microbial fuel cell, a core technology.
2003	April	Kim Jongsu (김종수)	Korea Astronomy and Space Science Institute, Applied Astronomy Research Department	Astronomy	Theoretical studies on the formation of giant molecular clouds
2003	May	Heo Namhoe (허남회)	Sogang University, College of Natural Sciences	Chemistry	First discovery of reentrant spin glass phenomenon in giant magnetoresistance materials
2003	June	Kim Seonchang (김선창)	KAIST	Biological sciences	Development of artificial strains for bioindustry
2003	July	Hahn Jangseon (한장선)	LG Chem Technology Research Institute/Functional Resin Research Institute	Chemical engineering	Manufacturing and commercialization of high-efficiency binders using a novel emulsion polymerization method.
2003	August	Ahn Chideuk (안치득)	Electronics and Telecommunications Research Institute	Digital electronics	Development of core technologies in the fields of multimedia and digital broadcasting and securing international standard technologies
2003	September	Kim Sung-hoon (김성훈)	Seoul National University	Molecular medicine and biopharmaceuticals	Downregulation of fuse-binding protein c-myc by tRNA synthetase cofactor p38 is required for lung cell differentiation
2003	October	Kim Yeongju (김영주)	Samsung Electronics, CTO Strategy Office Software Center	Computational statistics	Development of cell capacity analysis and wireless network design technology for third-generation mobile communication systems
2003	November	Yun Seokjin (윤석진)	Korea Institute of Science and Technology	Materials research	Development of a piezoelectric ultrasonic motor for nano-positioning control
2003	December	Kim Jingon (김진곤)	Pohang University of Science and Technology	Chemical engineering	Development of block copolymers with nanostructures only in a specific temperature range
2004	January	Bak Yeongok (박영옥)	Korea Institute of Energy Research	Clean energy	High-efficiency and multi-functional dust collection filter technology
2004	February	Oh Seunghun (오승훈)	SK Inc., Precision Chemical Research Team	Chemical engineering	Commercialization of transalkylation catalysts
2004	March	Shin Hee-Sup (신희섭)	Korea Institute of Science and Technology	Neuroscience	Elucidating the pain-suppressing mechanism of the consciousness-blocking gene
2004	April	Kim Chungseon (김충선)	Yonsei University	Physics	Exploring new possibilities for the asymmetry of matter and antimatter in the universe
2004	May	Sung Dan Keun (성단근)	KAIST	Electronic and computer science, and electrical and electronic engineering	Orthogonal code/resource hopping multiplexing method
2004	June	Kim Jin-soo (김진수)	Toolgen Co., Ltd.	Chemistry	Development and industrialization of gene regulation core technology
2004	July	Chung Kwang Hwa (정광화)	Chungnam National University	Semiconductor physics	Development of vacuum characteristic evaluation technology for 72 items and dissemination of vacuum technology information
2004	August	Choi Sookyung (최수경)	Gyeongsang National University	Physics	Played a leading role in the discovery of a new particle, X (3872), in Bell experiment
2004	September	Bak Juntaek (박준택)	KAIST	Chemistry	Synthesis, reactivity, and electrochemical properties of fullerene-metal complexes
2004	October	Bak Yongjo (박용조)	Samsung Advanced Institute of Technology, Photonics Lab	Metallurgical engineering	Development of 45 mW laser diode with 405 nm wavelength for next-generation optical recording devices
2004	November	Ahn Jihwan (안지환)	Korea Institute of Geoscience and Mineral Resources, Resource Utilization and Materials Research Department	Mineral processing engineering	Development of technology to manufacture high-functionality precipitated calcium carbonate using limestone as a raw material
2004	December	Lee Sangyeol (이상열)	Gyeongsang National University	Applied life sciences	A study on the biological defense mechanism through the two-function regulation of peroxiredoxin proteins in response to environmental stress
2005	January	Bak Sujin (박수진)	Korea Research Institute of Chemical Technology, Chemical Materials Research Department	Chemistry	Development of ultra-low-temperature adhesive sealant technology for LNG vessels
2005	February	Lee Yonghui (이용희)	KAIST	Physics	Current-driven single-cell photonic crystal laser
2005	March	Lee Giyong (이기용)	Samsung SDI, Central Research Institute, Development Team 1	Mechanics of materials	Development of world's first new low-temperature polysilicon crystallization technology for organic EL displays
2005	April	Kang Seongcheol (강성철)	Korea Institute of Science and Technology, Intelligent Robot Center	Robotics	Development and commercialization of Robhaz, a work robot with rough terrain driving
2005	May	Hahn Takdon (한탁돈)	Yonsei University	Computer science	Color-based image sensor research
2005	June	Ahn Gyuhong (안규홍)	Korea Institute of Science and Technology, Environmental Process Research Department	Civil engineering	Technologies for water source conservation and river water quality improvement
2005	July	Nam Wonu (남원우)	Ewha Womans University	Nanoscience and chemistry	Identification of intermediate production of oxygenase
2005	August	Baek Yunggi (백융기)	Yonsei University, General Graduate School	Biomedical sciences	Discovery and development of synthetic method for Daumone, a longevity-inducing nematode
2005	September	Lee Heun (이흔)	KAIST	Biochemical engineering	Elucidation of hydrogen storage phenomena within ice particles composed of water
2005	October	Kim Jinseok (김진석)	Korea Research Institute of Standards and Science, Quality of Life Standards Department	Chemistry	Air density redefines by discovering air composition errors
2005	November	Bak Jaegeun (박재근)	Hanyang University	Convergence electronics engineering	High-performance nano-SOI technology for information and communication semiconductors
2005	December	Im Gihong (임기홍)	Pohang University of Science and Technology	Electronics and electrical engineering	Technologies for single and multi-carrier communication methods
2006	January	Woo Jeongwon (우정원)	Ewha Womans University	Chemistry and nanoscience	Fabrication of three-dimensional photonic crystals and band gap control using liquid crystals
2006	February	Kwon Sikcheol (권식철)	Korea Institute of Machinery and Materials, Materials Research Institute	New materials engineering	Wear-resistant coating technology for inner surface of long-axis high-pressure cylinders
2006	March	Lee Myeongsu (이명수)	Seoul National University	Chemistry	Formation of supramolecular tubes through self-assembly of amphiphilic rigid-flexible macrocycle molecules
2006	April	Kim Gyeonggyu (김경규)	Sungkyunkwan University	Medicine	Elucidation of the three-dimensional structure of the B- and Z-type junctions of DNA
2006	May	Kim Jingeun (김진근)	KAIST	Civil and environmental engineering	Concrete crack control evaluation system
2006	June	Seo Yeongjun (서영준)	Seoul National University	Molecular medicine and biopharmaceuticals	Carcinogenic control technology using molecular markers and exploration of cancer-preventing food materials and elucidation of their mechanisms of action
2006	July	Choe Yanggyu (최양규)	KAIST	Electrical and electronic engineering	Development of the world's smallest 3nm-class nanoelectronic device (FinFET)
2006	August	Yeom Han-woong (염한웅)	Pohang University of Science and Technology	Physics	Discovery of unique phase transition in metal atomic line
2006	September	Keum Jonghae (금종해)	Korea Institute for Advanced Study	Mathematics	Classification of finite symmetry groups on K3 surfaces
2006	October	Lee Jong-ho (이종호)	Seoul National University	Electrical and computer engineering	High-density/high-performance 3D CMOS devices
2006	November	Ha Changsik (하창식)	Pusan National University	Polymer engineering	Development of organic-inorganic hybrid materials with highly regular, large nanopore structures.
2006	December	Jeong Jonggyeong (정종경)	Seoul National University	Life sciences	Elucidating the molecular mechanisms of Parkinson's disease
2007	January	Bak Seoksun (박석순)	Ewha Womans University	Environmental engineering	Model study for identifying hydraulic and water quality characteristics of Paldang Lake
2007	February	Hong Seongmin (홍성민)	Inha University	Life and marine sciences	Development of foundational technologies for glacier research
2007	March	Ahn Gwangseok (안광석)	Seoul National University	Life sciences	Discovering principle by which the immune system identifies and attacks only diseased cells
2007	April	Lee Munho (이문호)	Pohang University of Science and Technology	Advanced materials science	Development of ultra-low-k polymer nanomaterials and synchrotron X-ray nanoanalysis technology
2007	May	Shin Seongu (신성우)	Hanyang University	Architecture	Development of a sustainable high-rise building construction system
2007	June	Lee Ilhang (이일항)	Inha University	Information and communication engineering	Development of an optical printed circuit board (O-PCB)
2007	July	Jeong Yonghwan (정용환)	Korea Atomic Energy Research Institute, Advanced Core Materials Development Lab	Materials engineering	Development of high-performance zirconium alloy
2007	August	Suh Pann-Ghill (서판길)	Ulsan National Institute of Science and Technology	Feng Shui	Discovering core mechanisms of growth hormone signaling regulation
2007	September	Hahn Jeongho (한정호)	Chungbuk National University	Physics	New method for discovering exoplanets
2007	October	Kim Hwangyu (김환규)	Korea University	New materials chemistry	Spectroscopic studies to develop novel synthesis methods and elucidate the principles of high-efficiency light-amplifying nanomaterials
2007	November	Seon Umyeongho (선우명호)	Hanyang University	Future automotive engineering	Network-based next-generation automotive electronic control system design technology
2007	December	Ji Seonha (지선하)	Yonsei University, Graduate School of Public Health	Health	Impact of obesity on mortality
2008	January	Lee Munho (이문호)	Jeonbuk National University	Electronic information engineering	Jacket matrix discovery and optimal mobile communication code design
2008	February	Kim Sun-kee (김선기)	Seoul National University	Physics and astronomy	Dark matter search experiment
2008	March	Kim Seongjun (김성준)	Korea Institute of Machinery and Materials, Materials Research Institute	Steel	Development of advanced high-strength steel materials and integrated molded parts for automobiles
2008	April	Lee Jio (이지오)	KAIST	Nanoscience and technology	TLR receptor structure elucidation
2008	May	Kim Byeonghyeon (김병현)	Pohang University of Science and Technology	Convergence biotechnology	Development of novel quencher-free molecular beacon for nucleic acid analysis
2008	June	Oh Byeonggwon (오병권)	Seoul National University	Mathematical sciences	Study of n-normal form and n-universal form
2008	July	Lee Wonjae (이원재)	Ewha Womans University	Life sciences	Clarifying the principle of intestinal bacterial symbiosis
2008	August	Lee Eungsuk (이응숙)	Korea Institute of Machinery and Materials, Nanomachinery Research Center	Mechanical engineering	Development of large-area nanoimprinting processes and application technologies
2008	September	Park Nam-Gyu (박남규)	Sungkyunkwan University	Chemical engineering	Research on development and industrialization of core technologies for dye-sensitized solar cells
2008	October	Ahn Sunil (안순일)	Yonsei University	Atmospheric science	Elucidating mechanism of El Niño fluctuations due to global warming
2008	November	Bak Gwangseong (박광성)	Chonnam National University	Urology and medical sciences	Mechanism of vaginal lubrication through aquaporin water transport channels
2008	December	Paik Un-gyu (백운규)	Hanyang University	Energy engineering and new materials engineering	Development of cathode materials and processes for aqueous lithium secondary batteries
2009	January	Won Jongpil (원종필)	Konkuk University	Social and environmental systems engineering	Development and application of high-performance composite materials to improve performance of concrete structures
2009	February	Yu Beomjae (유범재)	Korea Institute of Science and Technology	Cognitive Robotics Research Group	Development of 'Maru', a real-time, remote-controlled network-based humanoid robot capable of full-body movement
2009	March	Oh Uhtaek (오우택)	Seoul National University	Molecular medicine and biopharmaceuticals	Cloning and functional studies of ANOCTAMIN1, a novel chlorine channel
2009	April	Jang Taehyeon (장태현)	Pohang University of Science and Technology	Chemistry	Development of precise separation/analysis method for polymers
2009	May	Lee Byeongtaek (이병택)	Soonchunhyang University	Medicine	Development of ceramic microstructure control and multi-extrusion process
2009	June	Kim Sangguk (김상국)	Seoul National University	Materials engineering	Establishment of magnetic vortex dynamics and development of core source technology for spin waves
2009	July	Kim Yeongjun (김영준)	Yonsei University	Biomedical sciences	Epigenetic regulation of gene expression
2009	August	Lee Pilho (이필호)	Kangwon National University	Organic chemistry	Development of new organic reaction using indium
2009	September	Lee Byoungho (이병호)	Seoul National University	Electrical and computer engineering	Research optical systems and image processing technologies for three-dimensional displays
2009	October	Kim Seungu (김승우)	KAIST	Mechanical and aerospace systems	Development of extreme ultraviolet laser based on plasmon resonance using an ultrashort laser
2009	November	Lee Yongnam (이용남)	Sogang University	Mathematics	Construction of simply connected general complex surface with geometric number 0
2009	December	Cho Minhaeng (조민행)	Korea University	Chemistry	Ultrashort-wave spectroscopy of optical isomers
2010	January	Yang Geunhyeok (양근혁)	Kyonggi University	Plant architecture engineering	Development of eco-friendly cement-free concrete
2010	February	Kim Sanggeon (김상건)	Seoul National University	Pharmacology	Research on mechanisms of fatty liver and steatohepatitis and new therapeutic drug classes
2010	March	Ham Byeongseung (함병승)	Inha University, Graduate School of Information and Communication Engineering	Information and communication engineering	Development of long-term quantum memory protocol
2010	April	Jo Gilwon (조길원)	Pohang University of Science and Technology	Chemical engineering	Development of stimulus-responsive functional nanosurfaces and organic printed electronic devices
2010	May	Jeong Haung (정하웅)	KAIST	Physics	Applications of complex network science
2010	June	Lee Takhui (이탁희)	Gwangju Institute of Science and Technology	Physics and astronomy	Development of molecular transistor devices
2010	July	Jang Jeongsik (장정식)	Seoul National University	Chemical and biological engineering	Development of high-sensitivity sensor manufacturing technology based on conductive polymer nanomaterials
2010	August	Jang Junyeon (장준연)	Korea Institute of Science and Technology	Metallurgical engineering	Development of spin transistor device utilizing electron spin
2010	September	Lee Hyeonu (이현우)	Pohang University of Science and Technology	Physics	Interdimensional universality of dynamic interfaces
2010	October	Hahn Changsu (한창수)	Korea Institute of Machinery and Materials, Nanomachinery Research Center	Mechanical engineering	Development of carbon nanotube separation technology using microchips
2010	November	Go Jaejung (고재중)	Korea University	Materials chemistry	Development of organic dyes for dye-sensitized solar cells
2010	December	Yu Hoejun (유회준)	KAIST	Electrical and electronic engineering	Development of object recognition processor that mimics the structure of the human brain
2011	January	Lee Changjoon Justin (이창준)	Korea Institute of Science and Technology	Chemistry	Elucidating the mechanism of signaling substance secretion in non-neuronal brain cells
2011	February	Lee Jaeu (이재우)	Sejong University	Astronomy and space science	Elucidating formation process of globular clusters and our galaxy
2011	March	Lee Simseong (이심성)	Gyeongsang National University	Chemistry	Development of intelligent nanosupramolecules with controlled photoluminescence through single-crystal structural transformation
2011	April	Kang Seongho (강성호)	Yonsei University	Electrical and electronic engineering	Research on testing and self-repair of effective memory
2011	May	Cha Jaechun (차재춘)	Pohang University of Science and Technology	Mathematics	Invariant theory for four-dimensional deformation of rings
2011	June	Kim Taehwan (김태환)	Hanyang University	Convergence electronics engineering	Development of next-generation non-volatile memory devices
2011	July	Hahn Yunbong (한윤봉)	Jeonbuk National University	Chemical engineering	Development of metal oxide nanostructure manufacturing and chemical/biosensor application technology
2011	August	Koh Gou Young (고규영)	KAIST	Life sciences	Development of "dual angiogenesis inhibitor" that inhibits cancer growth and metastasis
2011	September	Kim Eunseong (김은성)	KAIST	Physics	Discovery of supersolid phenomena
2011	October	Lee Hakju (이학주)	Korea Institute of Machinery and Materials	Mechanical engineering	Development of 10 nm-level nano-measurement source technology
2011	November	Yun Juyeong (윤주영)	Ewha Womans University	Chemical, biological and molecular sciences	Research on a fluorescent chemical sensor selective for APT
2011	December	Choe Junho (최준호)	KAIST	Life sciences	Novel gene twenty-four defines a critical translation step in the Drosophila clock
2012	January	Bak Baeho (박배호)	Konkuk University	Physics	Friction anisotropy-driver domain imaging on exfoliated monolayer graphene
2012	February	Lee Seonghwan (이성환)	Korea University	Brain engineering	Development of computer vision-based automatic human motion analysis and recognition technology
2012	March	Bak Chanbeom (박찬범)	KAIST	New materials engineering	Development of artificial photosynthesis technology based on nanomaterials
2012	April	Noh Cheoleon (노철언)	Inha University	Chemistry	Development of new atmospheric particle measurement and analysis technology
2012	May	Lee Myeonggyun (이명균)	Seoul National University	Physics and astronomy	Discovering massive structure in a wandering globular cluster
2012	June	Lee Sanghun (이상훈)	Korea University	Electrical engineering	Development of ultrafine fibers capable of coding materials and structures at the micro level and technologies applicable to regenerative medicine
2012	July	Jeong Huitae (정희태)	KAIST	Chemical and biological engineering	Development of core technology to improve graphene properties
2012	August	Lee Junho (이준호)	Seoul National University	Biotechnology	Cellular-level elucidation of the species' diffusion process
2012	September	Lee Giam (이기암)	Seoul National University	Mathematical engineering	Study of fully nonlinear equations
2012	October	Seo Gapyang (서갑양)	Seoul National University	Mechanical and aerospace engineering	High-sensitivity skin-attached sensor imitating the locking mechanism of a scarab wing
2012	November	Shin Injae (신인재)	Yonsei University	Chemistry	Discovery and application of biofunctional organic molecules that can regulate protein activity
2012	December	Yun Yeojun (윤여준)	Ewha Womans University	Chemical, biological and molecular sciences	Identification of antibiotic kanamycin biosynthesis process and development of novel antibiotic candidate for treating multidrug-resistant superbugs
2013	January	Kim Seonguk (김선국)	Kyung Hee University	Architecture	Development of high-mobility/flexible 2D nanoplate thin-film transistors
2013	February	Lee Jeongyong (이정용)	KAIST	New materials engineering	Development of a real-time atomic-level analysis technology for crystal growth in liquids
2013	March	Kim Jongseung (김종승)	Korea University	Chemistry	Development of novel drug delivery complex that combines disease diagnosis and treatment
2013	April	Yun Hongdeok (윤홍덕)	Seoul National University	Medical school	Identification of transcriptional network regulating stem cell pluripotency
2013	May	Kang Byeongnam (강병남)	Seoul National University	Physics and astronomy	Explosive percolation transition
2013	June	Lee Junghui (이중희)	Jeonbuk National University	Fusion engineering	Development of eco-friendly manufacturing technology for highly conductive nanocomposite materials
2013	July	Lee Taeu (이태우)	Pohang University of Science and Technology	New materials engineering	Development of high-efficiency flexible organic light-emitting diodes using graphene electrodes
2013	August	Hwang Seonuk (황선욱)	Korea University	Medical sciences	Discovery of salt taste receptor protein in the brain
2013	September	Kim Maenggi (김맹기)	Kongju National University	Atmospheric science	Elucidating impact of anthropogenic black carbon on accelerating glacier and snow melting in Himalayas and Tibetan Plateau
2013	October	Kim Donghun (김동훈)	Korea Institute of Machinery and Materials	Electronic engineering	Development of core technologies for unmanned processing optimization and autonomous response
2013	November	Kim Usik (김우식)	Kyung Hee University	Medicine	A new concept in crystallization technology using Taylor vortex
2013	December	Lee Seunghun (이승훈)	Seoul National University Hospital	Medicine	Development of ceria nanoparticles as a new stroke treatment
2014	January	Lee Heungno (이흥노)	Gwangju Institute of Science and Technology	Information and communication engineering	Realization of high-resolution information acquisition technology using sign-theoretic multi-compression sensing techniques
2014	February	Lee Jongram (이종람)	Pohang University of Science and Technology	New materials engineering	Development of substrate technology for flexible electronic devices
2014	March	Kim Jinyeong (김진영)	Ulsan National Institute of Science and Technology	Chemical engineering	Improving efficiency of polymer optoelectronic devices through surface plasmon resonance
2014	April	Ahn Jihun (안지훈)	Korea University	Life sciences	Identification of plant thermometer protein that detects temperature changes
2014	May	Kim Yeonghun (김영훈)	Seoul National University	Mathematical sciences	Moduli space and invariants of Riemann surfaces
2014	June	Kim Sanguk (김상욱)	KAIST	Computer engineering	Nanotechnology for molecular assembly of chemically doped carbon materials
2014	July	Bak Seungbeom (박승범)	Seoul National University	Chemistry	Quantum efficiency control technology of Seoul-Fluor, a unique fluorescent framework
2014	August	Jeon Jangsu (전장수)	Gwangju Institute of Science and Technology	Life sciences	Identifying cause of degenerative arthritis
2014	September	Gu Boncheol (구본철)	Seoul National University	Physics and astronomy	Confirming creation and origin of phosphorus (P), an essential element for living organisms
2014	October	Kim Jongman (김종만)	Hanyang University	College of Nanotechnology	Development of new fingerprint analysis method using sweat pore maps
2014	November	Hwang Cheolsang (황철상)	Pohang University of Science and Technology	Biotechnology	Discovery of N-terminal methionine protein degradation signal and degradation pathway
2014	December	Jang Yunseok (장윤석)	Pohang University of Science and Technology	Environmental analytical chemistry	Treatment of environmental pollutants using nano-bio fusion technology and identification of the environmental and ecological hazards of nanomaterials
2015	January	Jo Yonghun (조용훈)	KAIST	Physics	New concept photonic light source and light control technology using nanostructures
2015	February	Jo Gwanghyeon (조광현)	KAIST	Bio and brain engineering	Development of new cancer cell death control technology through IT convergence research
2015	March	Shin Sehyeon (신세현)	Korea University	Mechanical engineering	Separation of platelets from whole blood using standing surface acoustic waves in a microchannel
2015	April	Kim Jinhyeon (김진현)	Korea Institute of Science and Technology	Neurology	Creating 3D brain maps using the new brain neural network mapping technology (mGRASP)
2015	May	Lee Gitaek (이기택)	Pohang University of Science and Technology	Marine chemistry	Elucidating changes in marine ecosystem due to influx of atmospheric nitrogen pollutants
2015	June	Kim Seongung (김성웅)	Sungkyunkwan University	Energy science	Development of high-efficiency thermoelectric materials through formation of high-density grain boundary dislocations and elucidation of electronic and heat transfer phenomena
2015	July	Lee Changhui (이창희)	Seoul National University	Electrical and information engineering	Development of world's most efficient tri-color quantum dot light-emitting diode
2015	August	Lee Sangjun (이상준)	Pohang University of Science and Technology	Mechanical engineering	Identification of unknown biofluid phenomena and development of core technologies
2015	September	Ha Heonpil (하헌필)	Korea Institute of Science and Technology	Materials engineering	Low-temperature denitrification catalyst with high efficiency and durability that can operate over a wide temperature range
2015	October	Kim Yonghui (김용희)	Hanyang University	Pharmacology	Development of adipose cell-targeted gene delivery system for obesity treatment and obesity-induced metabolic syndrome
2015	November	Yeom Yeongil (염영일)	Korea Research Institute of Bioscience and Biotechnology	Molecular genetics	Identification of cell signaling system mediated by lactate
2015	December	Lee Taeeok (이태억)	KAIST	Systems engineering	Development of semiconductor manufacturing process equipment operation optimization and discrete event system scheduling theory and methods
2016	January	Kuk Jongseong (국종성)	Pohang University of Science and Technology	Climatology	Recent investigation into causes of climate change in Arctic and mid-latitude regions
2016	February	Kim Hyeonjae (김현재)	Yonsei University	Electrical and electronic engineering	Development of core backplane technologies for flat panel displays
2016	March	Kim Geunsu (김근수)	Pohang University of Science and Technology	Physics	Bandgap control and discovery of anisotropic Dirac states in two-dimensional materials
2016	April	Ham Sihyeon (함시현)	Sookmyung Women's University	Chemistry	Study of aggregation of disease-related proteins
2016	May	Jo Dongu (조동우)	Pohang University of Science and Technology	Mechanical engineering	Development of integrated 3D tissue/organ printing technology for regenerating damaged tissues/organs in the human body
2016	June	Shim Taebo (심태보)	Korea Institute of Science and Technology	Medicinal chemistry	Technology transfer (development of global innovative targeted anticancer drug candidates)
2016	July	Byeon Jaehyeong (변재형)	KAIST	Mathematical sciences	Development of variational calculus for constructing integrated solutions
2016	August	Han Wook-shin (한욱신)	Pohang University of Science and Technology	Creative IT convergence engineering	Development of world's most efficient big graph data analysis technology
2016	September	Noh Yongyeong (노용영)	Dongguk University	Convergence energy and new materials engineering	Development of ultra-thin, high-performance flexible electronic devices and high-sensitivity gas sensors using printing technology
2016	October	Kim Dongpyo (김동표)	Pohang University of Science and Technology	Chemical engineering	Development of microsecond synthetic chemistry control technology
2016	November	Jo Maenghyo (조맹효)	Seoul National University	Mechanical and aerospace engineering	Development of core technology for multiscale analysis of photoresponsive polymer materials
2016	December	Kim Jeonghun (김정훈)	Pohang University of Science and Technology	Life sciences	Dopamine regulation of amygdala inhibitory circuits for expression of learned fear
2017	January	Bak Taeseong (박태성)	Seoul National University	Statistics	Pathway-based approach using hierarchical components of collapsed rare variants
2017	February	Jeong Jonghwa (정종화)	Gyeongsang National University	Chemistry	Development of intelligent self-assembly supramolecular gels
2017	March	Bak Namgyu (박남규)	Seoul National University	Electrical and information engineering	Development of first top-down, universal metamaterial/metasurface
2017	April	Heo Wondo (허원도)	KAIST	Life sciences	Development of optogenetic source technology for controlling calcium ions in vivo
2017	May	Lee Jongseop (이종섭)	Korea University	Civil, architectural and environmental engineering	Development of geotechnical and geophysical ground property evaluation technology
2017	June	Kang Giseok (강기석)	Seoul National University	Materials engineering	Development of new materials for next-generation metal-air secondary batteries
2017	July	Yun Taeyeong (윤태영)	Seoul National University	Electrical engineering	Elucidating movement of membrane proteins at single molecular level
2017	August	Kim Ingang (김인강)	Korea Institute for Advanced Study	Mathematics	Analysis of difficult problems in topology and geometry of three-dimensional manifolds
2017	September	Shim Sangjun (심상준)	Korea University	Biochemical engineering	Development of DNA-based size- and shape-controlled metal nanoparticle synthesis technology
2017	October	Bak Jinhong (박진홍)	Sungkyunkwan University Department of Electrical and Electronic Engineering	Electrical engineering	Development of ultra-low-power semiconductor devices and circuit technology capable of ternary operation
2017	November	Seong Hyeongjin (성형진)	KAIST	Mechanical engineering	Development of sophisticated liquid droplet control technology for microfluidic chips
2017	December	Kim Changyeong (김창영)	Seoul National University	Solid state physics	Elucidating electronic structure of highly correlated materials, such as high-temperature superconductors
2018	January	Kim Jhoon (김준)	Yonsei University Department of Atmospheric Science	Atmospheric physics, atmospheric environment, remote sensing	Development of remote sensing technique capable of analyzing air pollution from a geostationary orbit, enabling observation of regional distribution and movement of air pollutants
2018	February	Lee Gyeongmu (이경무)	Seoul National University	Electrical engineering	Development of deep learning-based super-resolution image restoration technology
2018	March	Lee Huiseung (이희승)	KAIST	Chemistry	Development of magnetic compass using nonmagnetic biomolecular peptides
2018	April	Seon Jeongyun (선정윤)	Seoul National University	Materials engineering	Development of hydrogel-based touch panel with enhanced transparency and elasticity
2018	May	Bak Huiseong (박희성)	KAIST	Chemistry	Development of customized protein modification technology to control disease-causing proteins
2018	June	Kim Jhoon (김기현)	Hanyang University	Civil and environmental engineering	Detecting and controlling air pollutants using eco-friendly new materials
2018	July	Bak Honggyu (박홍규)	Korea University	Physics	Development of a light-powered nanowire transistor
2018	August	Yun Seongro (윤성로)	Seoul National University	Electrical and information engineering	Development of artificial intelligence technology for sequential big data analysis
2018	September	Gu Jongmin (구종민)	Korea Institute of Science and Technology	Chemical engineering	Development of MXene-polymer composite raw material technology
2018	October	Lee Haesin (이해신)	KAIST	Chemistry	Development of bloodless injection needle that doesn't bleed when pricked
2018	November	Kim Myeonghui (김명희)	Korea Research Institute of Bioscience and Biotechnology	Food microbiology	Elucidation of the antiviral function of protein synthesis enzyme complexes
2018	December	Cheon Jung Hee (천정희)	Seoul National University	Mathematics	Complete decryption of multilinear functions, the biggest issue in cryptography
2019	January	Lee Yongjae (이용재)	Yonsei University	Geology	First discovery of superhydrated minerals deep underground
2019	February	Lee Jongho (이종호)	Korea Institute of Science and Technology	Inorganic materials	Securing large-area proton ceramic fuel cell technology
2019	March	Choe Hyeonyong (최현용)	Yonsei University	Electrical and electronic engineering	Development of quantum information conversion device using a laser
2019	April	Bang Changhyeon (방창현)	Sungkyunkwan University	Chemical engineering, mechanical and aerospace engineering	Research octopus suction cups and diagnostic and therapeutic patch that can be stuck underwater
2019	May	Kim Hyeongbeom (김형범)	Yonsei University	Medicine	Precise prediction of gene editing activity using artificial intelligence
2019	June	Kwak Junmyeong (곽준명)	DGIST	Plant molecular genetics	Elucidating reason and principle why plant abscission always occurs in fixed location
2019	July	Shin Gwanu (신관우)	Sogang University	Chemistry	Implementing artificial cells that can metabolize energy on their own
2019	August	Bak Hoseok (박호석)	Sungkyunkwan University	Chemical engineering, polymer engineering	Elucidating energy storage mechanism of two-dimensional semiconductor phosphorene
2019	September	Song Seokho (송석호)	Hanyang University	Physics	Novel optical device operating principle that utilizes energy loss
2019	October	Bak Byeongguk (박병국)	KAIST	New materials engineering	Development of high-efficiency spin current-generating material, a key next-generation semiconductor technology
2019	November	Hong Yongtaek (홍용택)	Seoul National University	Electrical and information engineering	Development of flexible hybrid electronics technology based on printing processes
2019	December	Bak Jonghyeok (박종혁)	Chungbuk National University, Medical School	Medicine	Providing evidence for health research of people with disabilities and healthcare policies using big data
2020	January	Kim Dohwan (김도환)	Hanyang University	Chemical engineering	Development of electronic skin technology that mimics tactile cells applicable to wearable electronic devices
2020	February	Shim Jaeyun (심재윤)	Pohang University of Science and Technology	Electronics and electrical engineering	Development of nanowatt integrated circuits for ultra-small wireless IoT sensor platforms
2020	March	Hwang Daehui (황대희)	Seoul National University, Department of Life Sciences	Life sciences	Elucidation of genetic proteome mechanism of early-onset gastric cancer, a threat to those in their 30s and 40s
2020	April	Kim Sangu (김상우)	Sungkyunkwan University	New materials engineering	Development of technology to charge implantable medical devices using human-safe ultrasound
2020	May	Jeon Heonsu (전헌수)	Seoul National University, College of Natural Sciences, Department of Physics and Astronomy	Physics	Developing next-generation laser control technology by revealing properties of random optical modes
2020	June	Ye Sanguk (예상욱)	Hanyang University, (ERICA) Department of Marine Convergence Engineering	Atmospheric science	Identifying atmospheric circulation characteristics that control changes in precipitation in tropical Pacific due to increased CO_{2}
2020	July	Kim Sanghyeon (김상현)	Korea Institute for Advanced Study	Mathematics	Solved problem in topology by proving regularity of differential homomorphism groups
2020	August	Hong Wonbin (홍원빈)	Pohang University of Science and Technology Department of Electronics and Electrical Engineering	Electronics and electrical engineering	Providing data highway foundation with ultra-high frequency 5G communication antenna source technology
2020	September	Kim Byeongseok (김병석)	Korea Institute of Civil Engineering and Building Technology	Civil engineering	Development and commercialization of ultra-high-strength, high-durability super concrete with a 200-year lifespan
2020	October	Kim Jeongwon (김정원)	KAIST	Electrical engineering	Development of ultra-high-speed, high-resolution, and multi-functional sensor technology capable of detecting nanometer differences
2020	November	Baek Jongbeom (백종범)	Ulsan National Institute of Science and Technology	Polymer engineering	Breaking stereotype about metal magnets through discovering first plastic magnetic material
2020	December	Kim Jongpil (김종필)	Dongguk University	Biotechnology	Development of vivo cell fate conversion technology to treat Parkinson's disease
2021	January	Kim Beomjun (김범준)	KAIST	Chemical engineering	Development of high-performance fuel cells with durable block copolymer carbon particles
2021	February	Bak Gyeongpyo (박경표)	Seoul National University, School of Dentistry	Dentistry	Development of radiation protection agent that removes reactive oxygen species when exposed to radiation
2021	March	Bak Jinhyeong (박진형)	Sogang University	Mathematics	Solving geometric and algebraic problems of second varieties in algebraic geometry
2021	April	Hahn Seungyong (한승용)	Seoul National University	Electrical and information engineering	New record for DC magnetic fields using high-temperature superconducting magnets
2021	May	Shin Byeongha (신병하)	KAIST	New materials engineering	Development of high-efficiency, high-stability, large-bandgap perovskite solar cells
2021	June	Eom Jingi (엄진기)	Korea Railroad Research Institute, Future Transportation Policy Headquarters	Transportation engineering	Development of human-centered, big data-based passenger analysis system
2021	July	Shim Heungseon (심흥선)	KAIST	Physics	Theoretical elucidation and first demonstration of existence of condor spin cloud, a key to future semiconductor development
2021	August	Bak Huncheol (박훈철)	Konkuk University	Smart transportation engineering	Development of beetle-inspired flying robot capable of exploring without crashing
2021	September	Lee Changha (이창하)	Seoul National University	Chemical and biological engineering	Development of intelligent water treatment technology to improve removal efficiency of various new water pollutants
2021	October	Yang Changdeok (양창덕)	Ulsan National Institute of Science and Technology	Energy and chemical engineering	Development of core material that addresses both stability and efficiency of next-generation solar cells
2021	November	Lee Hyeokjin (이혁진)	Ewha Womans University, College of Pharmacy	Biomedical engineering	Development of lipid nanoparticles that aid in delivery of ribonucleic acid therapeutics and messenger ribonucleic acid vaccines into the body
2021	December	Kim Cheolhong (김철홍)	Pohang University of Science and Technology	Electronic and electrical engineer	Strengthening competitiveness of digital health industry through development and commercialization of optical ultrasound medical imaging
2022	January	Mun Juho (문주호)	Yonsei University	New materials engineering	Development of eco-friendly (green) hydrogen production technology using low-cost, high-efficiency solar cells
2022	February	Lee Junyeop (이준엽)	Sungkyunkwan University	Chemical engineering, polymer engineering	Breakthrough in display technology through development of high-efficiency, long-life blue organic light-emitting diodes (OLEDs)
2022	March	Jo Seungu (조승우)	Yonsei University	Biotechnology	Implementing an advanced artificial brain based on stem cells and tissue engineering
2022	April	Lee Changsu (이창수)	Korea Atomic Energy Research Institute	Energy eystems engineering	Development of complex behavior analysis simulator for deep disposal of high-level radioactive waste
2022	May	Lee Jeongyong (이정용)	KAIST	Electrical and electronic engineering	Development of high-efficiency photovoltaic devices using next-generation semiconductor heterojunctions
2022	June	Bak Seonyeong (박선영)	Kyungpook National University	Earth system sciences	Observing causes of global environmental change...providing scientific evidence for climate change response
2022	July	Kwon Sunghoon (권성훈)	Seoul National University	Electrical and information engineering	Developing solution for commercializing DNA memory with ultra-high-purity DNA purification technology
2022	August	Jo Gilyeong (조길영)	Pohang University of Science and Technology	Physics	Successfully maintaining "floquet state," which allows properties of matter to be altered by light
2022	September	Kim Donghyeon (김동현)	Korea Railroad Research Institute	Mechanical engineering	Development of high-speed rail tunnel sonic boom reduction hood
2022	October	Hahn Jeongu (한정우)	Pohang University of Science and Technology	Chemical engineering	Development of core technology for synthesizing nanocatalysts with excellent performance and stability
2022	November	Go Seunghwan (고승환)	Seoul National University	Mechanical engineering	Development of transparent silicon micropatterning technology applicable to organ-mimetic chips
2022	December	Bae Sangsu (배상수)	Seoul National University	Medical school	Development of sophisticated and safe next-generation DNA base-editing gene scissors
2023	January	Kim Yunseok (김윤석)	Sungkyunkwan University	New materials engineering	Realizing high-performance next-generation semiconductor materials using ion beams
2023	February	Song Yeongmin (송영민)	Gwangju Institute of Science and Technology	Information mechanical engineering	Development of amphibious, ultra-compact, wide-angle camera capable of 360-degree omnidirectional shooting
2023	March	Lee Sangho (이상호)	Kookmin University	Construction systems engineering	Development of next-generation water treatment, desalination, and water resource management technologies to overcome the water shortage crisis
2023	April	Kang Munjin (강문진)	KAIST	Mathematical sciences	Solving problem of shock waves in compressible Euler equations
2023	May	Shin Hyeonseok (신현석)	Ulsan National Institute of Science and Technology	Chemistry	Synthesis of amorphous boron nitride thin films capable of overcoming limitations of semiconductor microfabrication
2023	June	Kim Chanhyeok (김찬혁)	KAIST	Chemistry	Development of novel treatment for Alzheimer's disease using the immune system
2023	July	Choe Jeonggyun (최정균)	KAIST	Bio and brain engineering	Development of core technologies for smart immune cell systems and mRNA-based anticancer vaccines
2023	August	Kim Yunhui (김윤희)	Gyeongsang National University	Chemistry	Development of high-efficiency, high-stability materials for organic solar cells
2023	September	Kwon Ilhan (권일한)	Hanyang University	Resource and environmental engineering	Development of technology to increase the added value of carbon-cycle waste resources
2023	October	Shin Yeongsu (신영수)	KAIST	Electrical and electronic engineering	Development of high-performance semiconductor lithography optimization technology using machine learning
2023	November	Jeong Sangguk (정상국)	Myongji University	Mechanical engineering	Development of electronic self-cleaning glass for autonomous driving sensors
2023	December	Jeong Sujong (정수종)	Seoul National University	Environmental studies	Development of global carbon cycle diagnostic technology to address climate change
2024	January	Kim Taeil (김태일)	Sungkyunkwan University	Chemical engineering	Development of noise filter materials using biomimetic techniques and their application to bioelectronic devices
2024	February	Kim Jeong (김정)	KAIST	Mechanical engineering	Development of large-area robotic skin technology capable of human-like tactile sensation and wound healing
2024	March	Kim Daedeok (김대덕)	Seoul National University	Pharmaceutical sciences	Development of ultra-small, tumor-targeting nanoparticles capable of extracorporeal excretion through advanced design strategies
2024	April	Son Donghui (손동희)	Sungkyunkwan University	Electronics and electrical engineering	Development of flexible bioelectronic device system capable of interfacing with biological tissue
2024	May	Seo Mingyo (서민교)	KAIST	Physics	Extreme challenges and rediscovery of optical irreflection and optical vacuum
2024	June	Kim Seunggyu (김승규)	Incheon National University	Oceanography	Unraveling global circulation of microplastics and Arctic's role
2024	July	Junsuk Rho (노준석)	Pohang University of Science and Technology	Mechanical engineering, chemical engineering, electrical and electronic engineering	Development of materials and processing technology for mass production of ultra-thin metalens
2024	August	Kim Changseok (김창석)	Pusan National University	Optical mechatronics engineering	Development of color-modulated 4D optical imaging technology that enables autonomous driving even in bad weather
2024	September	Lee Seongjung (이성중)	Seoul National University	Dental science	First study identifying mechanism by which brain glial cells regulate social behavior
2024	October	Park Moon Jeong (박문정)	Pohang University of Science and Technology	Chemistry	Polymer phase transition research
2024	November	Jeong Ilmun (정일문)	Korea Institute of Civil Engineering and Building Technology	Water resources engineering	Development of bypass-type sand dam to improve water welfare in mountainous areas
2024	December	Kim Beomjun (김범준)	Pohang University of Science and Technology	Physics	Discovery of spin nematic phase
2025	January	Choe Hyeongjin (최형진)	Seoul National University	Medicine	GLP-1 appetite regulation mechanism by the hypothalamus
2025	February	Lee Geonjae (이건재)	KAIST	New materials engineering	Development of surface-emitting micro LED mask using micro-mass vacuum transfer
2025	March	Lee Sanghyeok (이상혁)	Seoul National University	Mathematical sciences	Bounded maxima of functions on space curves
2025	April	Oh Junhak (오준학)	Seoul National University	Chemical and biological engineering	Manufacturing of chiral organic materials and application in advanced optoelectronic devices
2025	May	Kim Jaejun (김재준)	Seoul National University	Electrical and information engineering	Lightweighting of AI models and design of dedicated semiconductor accelerators
2025	June	Oh Hyeongseok (오형석)	Korea Institute of Science and Technology, Clean Energy Research Center	Chemical and biological engineering	Development and demonstration of high-value-added compound (e-Chemical) production technology through electrochemical CO_{2} conversion
2025	July	Kim Sanghyeon (김상현)	Yonsei University	Civil and environmental engineering	Development of high-efficiency, continuous production technology for "eco-friendly life science hydrogen (green biohydrogen)" using organic waste resources
2025	August	Jeong Myeonghwa (정명화)	Sogang University	Physics	Discovery of room-temperature quantum mechanical spin pumping phenomenon
2025	September	Jeong Jaeung (정재웅)	KAIST	Electrical and electronic engineering	Development of variable stiffness intravenous needle that softens with body temperature
2025	October	Han Bohyeong (한보형)	Seoul National University	Computer engineering	Development of an inference algorithm (FIFO-Diffusion) for generating infinite-length images without additional learning.
2025	November	Choe Mingi (최민기)	KAIST	Biochemical engineering	Development of a high-performance catalyst for environmentally friendly ammonia synthesis
2025	December	Lee Gwan-hyung (이관형)	Seoul National University	Materials engineering	Development of "hypotaxy," a large-area single-crystal 2D semiconductor growth platform

== See also ==
- National Scientist of the Republic of Korea
- Kyung-Ahm Prize
- Korea Science Award
- Hansung Science Award
