= Suh Jin-suck =

South Korean medical professor

Jin-Suck Suh
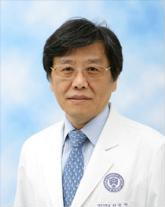
- Born: Seoul, South Korea
- Education: Yonsei University (MD) & Ajou University (PhD)
- Awards: Top Scientist and Technologist Award of Korea (2007); Award At Science Yonsei University (2007); Gey-Hyun Scholar Award, Yonsei Medical College (2008); Avison Distinguished Professor (2011)
- Scientific career
- Fields: Department of Medicine
- Workplaces: Yonsei University
- Doctoral advisor: Suh Jung-ho

- Suh Jin-suck
- Hangul: 서진석
- RR: Seo Jinseok
- MR: Sŏ Chinsŏk

Jin-Suck Suh is a South Korean medical professor. He graduated with MD from Yonsei University in 1979. He received PhD in 1999 from Ajou University. He is the Avison Distinguished Professor, 2011 at Yonsei University. Suh is a director as well as a principal investigator in imaging development projects of medical convergence research institute at Yonsei University.

== Education ==
Suh graduated with MD from Yonsei University in 1979. He received PhD in 1999 from Ajou University. His PhD thesis has focused on metal induced MR imaging artifacts. Suh took the residency 4-years training and 2 years fellowship in department of Radiology, Severance Hospital, Yonsei University.

== Research ==
Suh's subspecialty is the imaging for the musculoskeletal diseases and he continued to study on the MR contrast agent (iron oxide nanoparticles) development since 1996 and MR perfusion and molecular imaging. He proved the concept of targeted cancer molecular imaging using high sensitive antibody conjugated magnetic nanoparticle agents. He could improve the sensitivity for the detection of a tumor of very small size and then revealed the possibility of personalized therapy. For this work he was awarded South Korea's highest scientific technical award in 2007. He has been working as Avison Distinguished Professor, 2011 in Yonsei University. Suh is a director as well as a principal investigator in imaging development projects of medical convergence research institute in Yonsei university and Korea's Frontier Research Scientist, named by the Korean Academy of Science and Technology (KAST) 2011.

== Selected works ==
- Artificially engineered magnetic nanoparticles for ultrasensitive molecular imaging. Nature Medicine 13,95-99(2007)
- In vivo magnetic resonance detection of cancer by using multifunctional magnetic nanocrystals. J Am Chem Soc 127 (35), pp 12387–12391 (2005)
- Nanoscale size effect of magnetic nanocrystals and their utilization for cancer diagnosis via magnetic resonance imaging (MRI). J Am Chem Soc 127 (16), pp 5732–5733(2005)
- pH-triggered drug-releasing magnetic Nanoparticles for cancer therapy guided by Molecular Imaging by MRI. Advanced Materials (2011): https://doi.org/10.1002/adma.201100351
- Molecular imaging with terahertz waves. Opt. Express (2011),
- Surface modification of magnetic nanocrystals in the development of highly efficient magnetic resonance probes for intracellular labeling. J Am Chem Soc(2005)127 (28), pp 9992–9993
