= Kwon Oh-hyun =

Kwon Oh-hyun (born 15 October 1952) is the former Vice Chairman and CEO of Samsung Electronics. In 2013, Time Magazine added him to their top 100 list of most influential people. In 2014, he was awarded the Top Scientist and Technologist Award of Korea by the Korean Federation of Science and Technology Societies (ko).

In October 2017, he announced that he would resign in March 2018, citing an "unprecedented crisis".

== Education ==
Kwon has a B.S. in electrical engineering from Seoul National University, a M.S. in electrical engineering from KAIST (Korea Advanced Institute of Science and Technology), and a Ph.D. in electrical engineering from Stanford University.

== Career ==
Since Kwon joined Samsung Electronics' Semiconductor Business in 1985, he has played a pivotal role in Samsung Electronics' rapid advance in the semiconductor industry. He successfully led the development of the industry's first 64Mb DRAM in 1992, and was promoted to Vice President of Samsung's Memory Device Technology unit three years later. In 1998, Kwon was appointed Senior Vice President and head of System LSI Division's ASIC business. In 2000, he became Executive Vice President and head of LSI Technology. In January 2004, Kwon was appointed President and General Manager of the System LSI Division. During his 10 years at the System LSI Division, he gained special recognition for achieving top market shares of display driver ICs, application processors and CMOS image sensors. In May 2008, Kwon was appointed President of Semiconductor Business (now Device Solutions). In December 2011, he was promoted to Vice Chairman of Samsung Electronics.

== Awards ==
- 2012: Inchon Award
