= Kim Kyu-won =

South Korean biologist

- Born: 1952 (age 73–74); Daegu, South Korea
- Education: University of Minnesota, Minneapolis, United States
- Known for: Angiogenesis Vascular Biology, Blood-Brain Barrier
- Awards: Scientist of the Month, National Research Foundation of Korea (2003); Top Scientist and Technologist Award of Korea (2003); The Role Model Scientists, Korea Science Foundation (2005); Ho-Am Prize in medicine, Ho-Am Foundation (2005); Chungsan Award, Korean Society for Biochemistry and Molecular Biology (2012)
- Scientific career
- Fields: Bioscience
- Workplaces: Seoul National University
- Doctoral advisor: Robert J. Roon

Korean name
- Hangul: 김규원
- RR: Gim Gyuwon
- MR: Kim Kyuwŏn

Kim Kyu-won (born 1952) is a South Korean biologist.

== Education ==
Kim graduated from Seoul National University in 1976, and the Masters programme at the Korea Advanced Institute of Science and Technology in 1978, before going on to study a Ph.D. in Biochemistry at the University of Minnesota in Minneapolis, United States, concluding in 1985.

== Work ==
Kim's post-doctorate career began as a Postdoctoral Fellow at the Department of Cancer Genetics, Dana–Farber Cancer Institute, Harvard Medical School between 1985 and 1987.

- Academic Appointment
  - Assistant Professor, Associate Professor, Professor, Department of Molecular Biology, Pusan National University, Korea (1987–2000)
  - Director, Research Institute of Genetic Engineering, Pusan National University, Korea (1994–1998)
  - Professor, College of Pharmacy, Seoul National University, Korea (2000)
  - President, The Korean Society for Vascular Biology (2001–2003)
  - Full member, The Korean Academy of Science and Technology (2001)
  - Vice-chairman, The Korean Cancer Association (2011–2012)

== Technical reports and conference/event proceedings ==
- 8th Cerebral Vascular Biology International Conference, Invited lecturer, Japan (2008)
- 12th International Symposium Signaling at Blood Brain and Blood Retinal Barrier, Invited lecturer, United Kingdom (2009)
- The Second Pacific Symposium on Vascular Biology, Invited speaker, South Korea (2011)
- 70th Annual Meeting of the Japanese Cancer Association (JCA2011), Chairman/ Organizer, Japan (2011)
- The XXVth International Symposium on Cerebral Blood Flow, Metabolism, and Function, Invited lecturer, Spain (2011)
- Seoul Brain Barrier Symposium, Organizer, South Korea (2012)
