= Korea Brain Research Institute =

Research complex in Daegu, South Korea

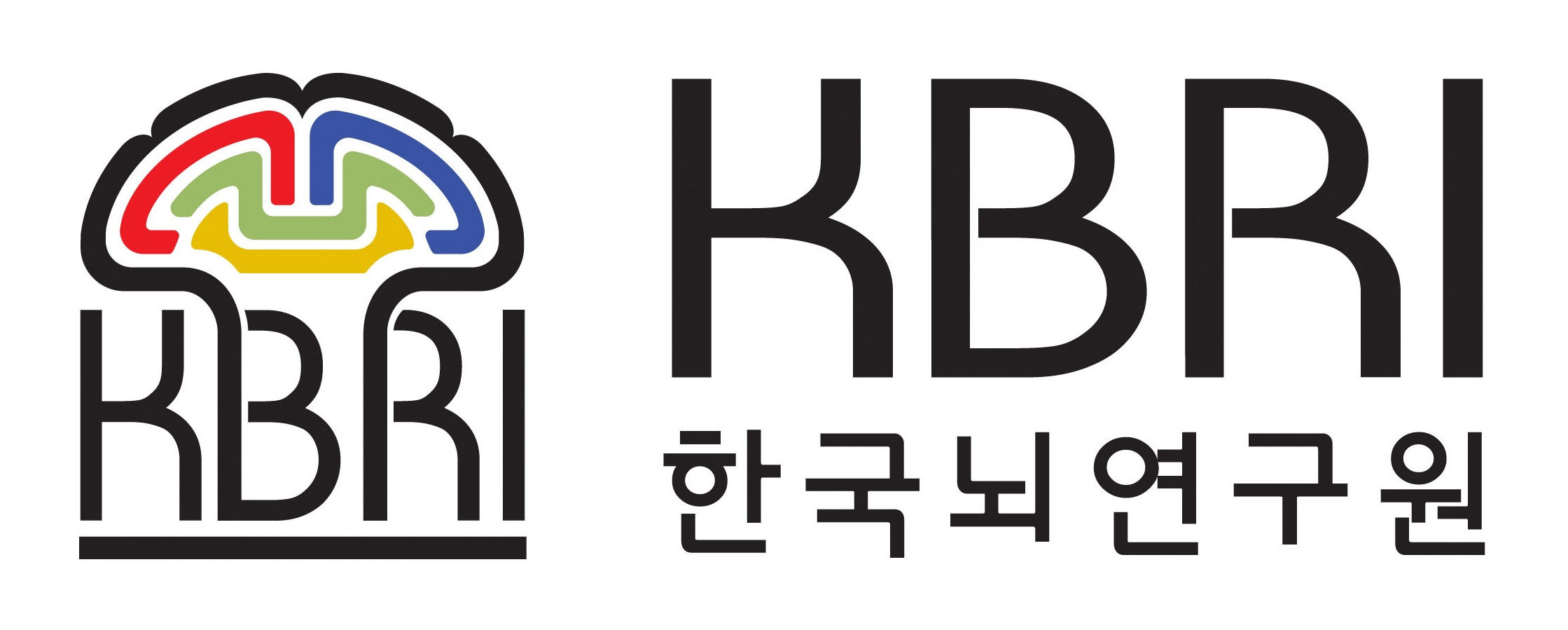
- Formation: December 2011; 14 years ago
- Headquarters: 61 Cheomdan-ro, Dong-gu, Daegu
- Coordinates: 35.882559°N 128.730216°E
- President: Suh Pann-Ghill
- Website: www.kbri.re.kr

- Korea Brain Research Institute
- Hangul: 한국뇌연구원
- Hanja: 韓國腦硏究院
- RR: Hanguk noe yeonguwon
- MR: Han'guk noe yŏn'guwŏn

The Korea Brain Research Institute (KBRI) is a research institute in South Korea. Core facilities include the Korea Brain Bank and lab animal centers. The KBRI is an affiliated institute of the Daegu Gyeongbuk Institute of Science and Technology.

== History ==
Legally enacted in 1998 through the Brain Research Promotion Act, the preliminary feasibility survey took place in 2007. Daegu was selected in 2011 and construction was completed in 2014.

== KIMS Presidents ==
- Suh Yoo-hun (서유헌), July 2012–July 2015
- Kim Gyeongjin (김경진), July 2015–December 2018
- Suh Pann-Ghill (서판길), December 2018–Current

== See also ==
- Korea Research Institute of Bioscience and Biotechnology
- National Academy of Sciences of the Republic of Korea
