= Byoungho Lee =

South Korean electrical engineer (1964–2022)

- Born: 1964; South Korea
- Died: 7 November 2022 (aged 58)
- Education: Seoul National University; University of California at Berkeley
- Scientific career
- Fields: Three-dimensional displays Nanophotonics
- Workplaces: Seoul National University

Byoungho Lee (Korean: 이병호; Hanja: 李竝浩; 1964 – 7 November 2022) was a South Korean scientist best known for his work on three-dimensional displays and nanophotonics. From 1994 until his death, he was on the faculty of the School of Electrical and Computer Engineering of Seoul National University. He and his research group published more than 400 peer-reviewed international journal papers, more than 700 international conference papers, and more than 20 books and book chapters. His accumulated citations are over 23,000 and his h-index is 75. At the time of his death, he was the dean of the Engineering College of Seoul National University.

== Biography and career ==
Lee received his B.S. (1987), M.S. (1989) from EE, Seoul National University, and Ph.D. degree (1993) from EECS, University of California at Berkeley. In September 1994, he joined the School of Electrical and Computer Engineering, Seoul National University as faculty. He was a committee member of OSA, SPIE and IEEE and a fellow of Society for Information Display. He has served as a Director-at-Large of OSA, Chair of the Member and Education Services Council of OSA, and was serving as the Chair of the Fabrication, Design and Instrumentation Technical Division of OSA. He also served as President of the Korean Information Display Society and as President of the Optical Society of Korea. He served as the General Chair of Applied Optics and Photonics China, and Chair of Steering Committee of CLEO Pacific Rim. He was on editorial board of Light: Science & Applications (NPG), Advances in Optics and Photonics (OSA), and Optica (OSA), which are among the most distinguished journals in optics and photonics. He has received several distinguished academic awards such as Jinbojang Presidential Science Badge of Korea (Apr. 2016), the Academic Award of Seoul National University (Nov. 2013), and the Scientist of the Month award of Korea (Sept. 2009).

== Research interests ==
Later research interests of Byoungho Lee and his group at Seoul National University ranged from system level to device level optical engineering. Along with long-time professions for holography, integral imaging, optical fibers, and plasmonics, he and his group were dedicated to developing advanced head-mounted displays for three-dimensional augmented reality, light field displays, and real-time three-dimensional microscopy. More high functioning optical elements were also researched such as lenses, polarizers, directional couplers, color filters, and spatial light modulators based on metasurfaces and holographic optical elements.

== Personal life and death ==
Lee died on 7 November 2022, at the age of 58.
