= Yeom Han-woong =

South Korean physicist

Yeom Han-Woong
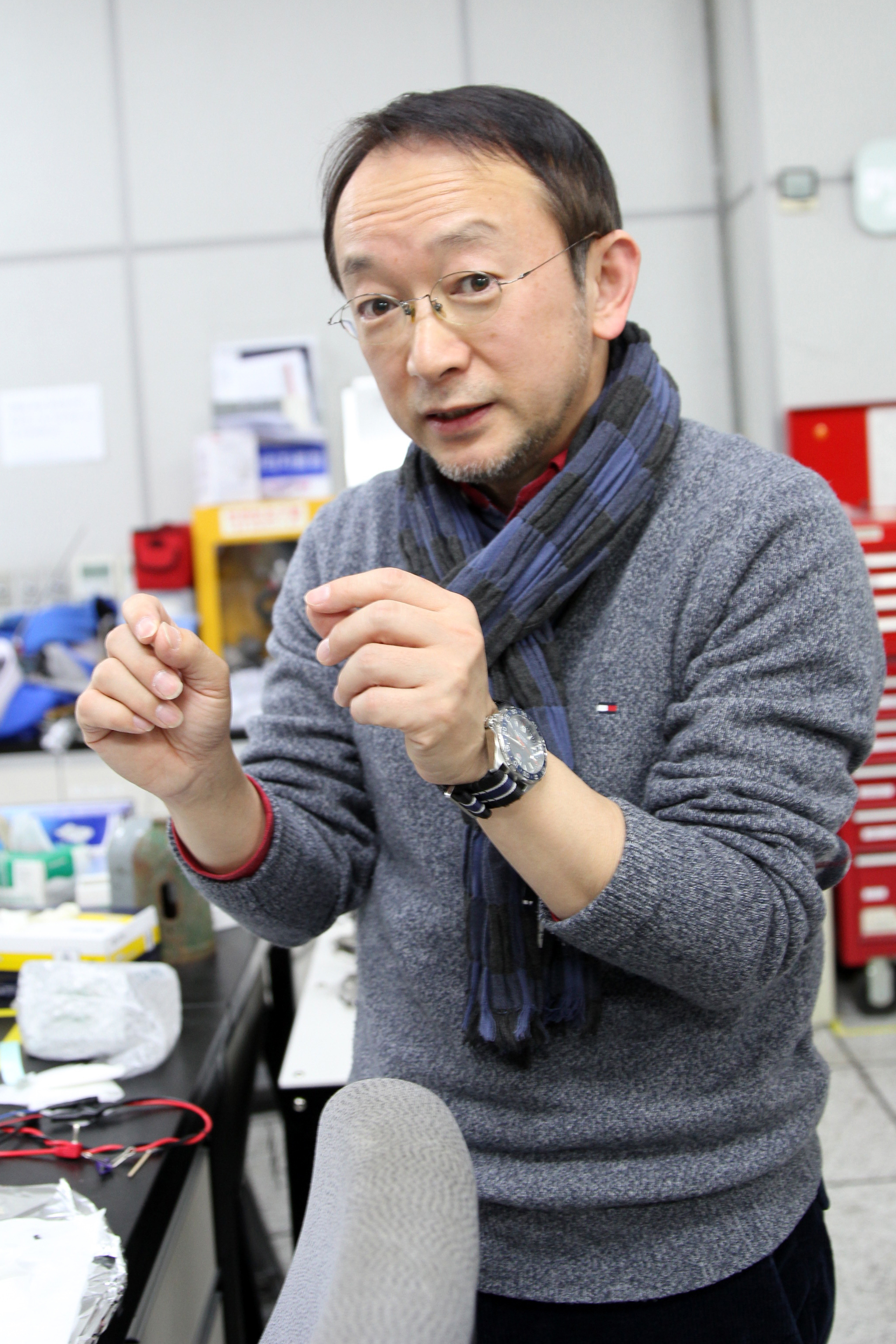
- Yeom Han-Woong
- Born: 5 December 1966; Seoul, South Korea
- Education: Tohoku University
- Known for: Pioneering the physics research of self-assembled atomic wires
- Awards: Young Researcher of the Year, Japanese Society for Synchrotron Radiation Research (1999) Scientist of the Month, Ministry of Science and Technology of Korea (2006) Academic Achievement Award, Korean Physical Society (2007)
- Scientific career
- Fields: Physics
- Workplaces: Pohang Institute of Science and Technology, Yonsei University, Institute for Basic Science
- Doctoral advisor: Shozo Kono

- Yeom Han-woong
- Hangul: 염한웅
- Hanja: 廉罕雄
- RR: Yeom Hanung
- MR: Yŏm Hanung

Yeom Han-woong (born 5 December 1966) is a South Korean physicist. A tenured professor at POSTECH, he has led several research centers for the university and from 2013 in collaboration with the Institute for Basic Science. He is a Fellow of the American Physical Society and has served as vice chairman of the Korean government's first science and technology advisory group for three consecutive terms. With more than 300 publications to his name, his research has been cited over 5,000 times giving him an h-index of 40 and i10-index of 125.

== Career ==
He was born in Seoul, and studied physics as an undergraduate at Seoul National University before going on to Tohoku University in Japan as a doctoral student. Thereafter he was a research associate at the Department of Chemistry, University of Tokyo (1996–2000). He then returned to his native South Korea, where he was an assistant/associate professor at the Department of Physics, Yonsei University (2000–2009), and then a full professor (2009–2010). During his time at Yonsei, he was part of a research team that developed a semiconductor nanometer wire with a thickness of 1 to 3 atoms.

Afterwards he moved to the Department of Physics, POSTECH (2010–present), where he served as director of Center for Atomic Wires and Layers (2003–2012), director of Center for Low Dimensional Electronic Symmetries (2012–2013), and founding director of Center for Artificial Low Dimensional Electronic Systems, Institute for Basic Science (2013–present).

== Awards ==
- 1999: Young Researcher of the Year, Japanese Society for Synchrotron Radiation Research
- 2006: Outstanding Faculty of the Year, Yonsei University
- 2006: Scientist of the Month, Ministry of Science and Technology
- 2007: Academic Achievement Award, Korean Physical Society
- 2007: Honored Invitation as Young Scientist of Asia, Japanese Society of Applied Physics
- 2010: Outstanding Referee (Lifetime honor), American Physical Society
- 2012: Leading Korean Research Scientist, Korean Academy of Science and Technology
- 2015: Korea Science Award, President of Korea
- 2016: Inchon Award for Science and Technology, Inchon Foundation and The Dong-a Ilbo
- 2017: Kyung-Ahm Prize in Natural Science, Kyung-Ahm Prize Foundation
- 2017: Asian Scientist 100, Asian Scientist

== Selected publications ==
1. Self-Assembled Nanowires with Giant Rashba Split Bands. Phys. Rev. Lett. 110, 036801 (2013).
2. Topological Solitons versus Nonsolitonic Phase Defects in a Quasi-One-Dimensional Charge-Density Wave. Phys. Rev. Lett. 109, 246802 (2012).
3. Radial band structure of electrons in liquid metals. Phys. Rev. Lett. 107, 136402 (2011).
4. Nearly Massless Electrons in the Silicon Interface with a Metal Film. Phys. Rev. Lett. 104, 246803 (2010).
5. Giant kink in the electron dispersion of strongly coupled lead nanowires. Nano Lett. 9, 1916 (2009).
6. Choi, Won Hoon; Kang, Pil Gyu; Ryang, Kyung Deuk; Yeom, Han Woong (2008). "Band-structure engineering of gold atomic wires on silicon by controlled doping". Physical Review Letters. 100 (12) 126801. American Physical Society. Bibcode:2008PhRvL.100l6801C. doi:10.1103/PhysRevLett.100.126801. PMID 18517895.
