= Dan Keun Sung =

South Korean electrical engineer (born 1952)

- Born: 19 July 1952 (age 74)
- Awards: Scientist of the Month (2004)

Academic background
- Education: University of Texas at Austin
- Thesis: Modeling and analysis of a nonlinear elastomer impact problem

Korean name
- Hangul: 성단근
- Hanja: 成檀根
- RR: Seong Dangeun
- MR: Sŏng Tan'gŭn

Dan Keun Sung (Korean: 성단근; born 19 July 1952) is a South Korean professor of electronic engineering at the Korea Advanced Institute of Science and Technology (KAIST) in Daejeon.

Sung was born in South Gyeongsang Province. He received his B.Sc. in electronic engineering from Seoul National University in 1975 before going on to the University of Texas at Austin, where he received his M.Sc. (1982) and Ph.D. (1986) in electrical and computer engineering. He was named Fellow of the Institute of Electrical and Electronics Engineers (IEEE) in 2015 for contributions to network resource management. He is also a member of the Korean Academy of Science and Technology.
