= Choi Yang-do =

South Korean scientist (born 1953)

Choi Yang-do 최양도
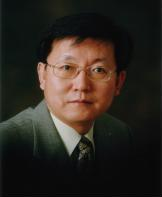
- Born: 1953 (age 72–73); Seoul, South Korea
- Known for: JMT & Stress tolerant high yield rice
- Awards: Top Scientist and Technologist Award of Korea (2008); National Academy of Sciences Award of Korea (2009)
- Scientific career
- Fields: Agricultural biotechnology
- Workplaces: Seoul National University
- Doctoral advisor: Gideon Dreyfuss

Korean name
- Hangul: 최양도
- Hanja: 崔良燾
- RR: Choe Yangdo
- MR: Ch'oe Yangdo

Choi Yang-do (Korean: 최양도; born 1953) is a South Korean agricultural biotechnologist. His research focuses on the development of crops with stress-tolerant and yield-enhancing traits. One of his academic achievements is the discovery of a new jasmonate which enhances resistance against external stress of the crop. Choi is currently professor at Seoul National University in South Korea.

== Biography ==
Choi Yang-do was born in Seoul, South Korea. He studied agricultural chemistry at Seoul National University (1972–1976) and graduated with a BS degree. From 1976 to 1978 he received a MS degree in biological science from Korea Advanced Institute of Science and Technology (KAIST) and earned his Ph.D. in biochemistry, molecular biology and cell biology from 1981 to 1985 at Northwestern University in Evanston.

== Researches ==
Choi researched jasmonates, which are believed to participate in signal transduction processes between external stresses, such as wounding, pathogenic attack, or cell response by activating the defense genes. He discovered a new enzyme, (EC2.1.1.141) jasmonate carboxyl methyltransferase (JMT), which catalyzes the methylation of jasmonate to MeJA. The overexpression of the JMT gene confers resistance to pathogens. He is currently working to understand the molecular function of MeJA, JMT, and its effector genes. Furthermore, the genetic engineering of crops by application of those genes and knowledge is under investigation.

The major research activity is the discovery of a novel enzyme and its genes encoding jasmonic acid carboxyl methyltransferase, which is involved in stress response and signal transduction in plant. Other achievements are the development of drought tolerant transgenic rice and transferred technology to Mahyco, India and the development of yield-enhanced transgenic rice and transferred technologies to BASF Plant Science in Germany.

== Awards ==
For his scientific achievements Choi received the New Technology Development Award from the Ministry of Science & Technology (1992), the Special Award from Korean Society for Molecular & Cell Biology from the Korean Society of Molecular and Cellular Biology (1999), the 11th Sangrok Agriculture & Life Science Award from Seoul National University College of Agriculture (2002), the Excellent Monograph Award from the Korean Federation for Science & Technology Societies (2003), the 11th Hwanong Award from Hwanong Academy & Research Foundation (2004), the KSABC Award from the Korean Society for Applied Biology and Chemistry (2006), the 52nd NAS Award from the National Academy of Sciences, and the Top Scientist and Technologist Award of Korea from the Korean Federation of Science and Technology Societies (2008).
