= Rhee Sue-goo =

American biochemist

- Hangul: 이서구
- Hanja: 李瑞九
- RR: I Seogu
- MR: I Sŏgu

Rhee Sue-Goo (born 1943) is a Korean-born American biochemist. Rhee was chief of the Laboratory of Cell Signaling, National Heart, Lung, and Blood Institute, National Institutes of Health (NIH), Bethesda, Maryland. He moved to Ewha Womans University in South Korea in 2005.

Rhee received his B.S. degree in chemistry from Seoul National University and PhD degree in organic chemistry from The Catholic University of America in 1966 and 1972, respectively. He was a postdoctoral fellow of Earl Stadtman's group at NIH. He started his own lab at NIH as a section chief of signal transduction after several years of working as a senior biochemist.

His most acclaimed contribution to cell signaling is the discovery of seven of the twelve isozymes of phospholipase C He was ranked among the most cited 250 biochemists and National Scientist of the Republic of Korea.
