= Choong Eui Song =

South Korean organic chemist (born 1955)

- Born: January 15, 1955 (age 71); Seoul, South Korea
- Education: BS. 1980 Chemistry, Chung-Ang University; Diplom. 1985 Chemistry, RWTH Aachen University; Ph.D. 1988 Chemistry, RWTH Aachen University
- Known for: enantioselective synthesis
- Awards: 1998, Korean 52 Research Scientists; 2002, Scientist of the Month; 2004, Distinguished Contribution Award for New Drug Development; 2013, KCS Academic Excellence Grand Prize; 2017, Academic Excellence Grand Prize; 2018, Korean Academy of Science and Technology member
- Scientific career
- Fields: Organic chemistry
- Workplaces: 1989–2004 Korea Institute of Science and Technology; 2004- Sungkyunkwan University
- Doctoral advisor: Wolfgang Kläui

- Choong Eui Song
- Hangul: 송충의
- Hanja: 宋忠儀
- RR: Song Chungui
- MR: Song Ch'ungŭi

Choong Eui Song (Korean: 송충의; born January 15, 1955) is a South Korean organic chemist.

== Biography ==
Song was born and raised in Seoul. He received his B.S. degree from Chung-Ang University in 1980, and received a diploma (1985) and a Ph.D. (1988) at RWTH Aachen University in Germany.

After completing his Ph.D., he worked as Principal Research Scientist at the Korea Institute of Science and Technology (KIST). In 2001, he was appointed as a head of the National Research Laboratory for Green Chirotechnology in Korea. In 2004, he moved to Sungkyunkwan University (Department of Chemistry) as a full professor. In 2005, he was elected as the vice-president of Korean Chemical Society. From 2006 to 2014 he worked as a director at the Research Institute of Advanced Nanomaterials (University-centered Lab, Korea Research Foundation). In 2016 he was appointed as a director of National Research Laboratory for Chiral Organic Molecular Materials in Korea.

His research has been focused on asymmetric organocatalysis, biomimetic catalysis, artificial enzyme, on-water catalysis and on-droplet catalysis. His current research also focuses on prebiotic chemistry, specifically, the origin of homochirality (chirality amplification process).

== Honors and awards ==
- 2000: Scientist of the Month Award, Korea Institute of Science and Technology
- 2002: Scientist of the Month, Ministry of Science and Technology
- 2013: Academic Excellence Grand Prize, Korean Chemical Society
- 2018: Member, Korean Academy of Science and Technology
