= Daegu Gyeongbuk Institute of Science and Technology =

University in South Korea

Coordinates: 35.7053°N 128.4571°E

Daegu Gyeongbuk Institute of Science and Technology (DGIST)
- 대구경북과학기술원
- Type: National
- Established: September 7, 2004
- President: Lee Kunwoo
- Academic staff: 594
- Administrative staff: 393
- Total staff: 987
- Students: 2,381 (2026)
- Undergraduates: 1,182 (2026)
- Postgraduates: 1,199 (2026)
- Location: 333, Techno Jungang-daero, Hyeonpung-eup, Dalseong-gun, Daegu, South Korea
- Campus: Urban 674,101 square metres (166.57 acres)
- Colors: Blue and Gray
- Website: www.dgist.ac.kr/eng/index.do

Daegu Gyeongbuk Institute of Science and Technology (DGIST; Korean: 대구경북과학기술원) is a public science and engineering university located on Daegu Technopolis, Daegu, South Korea. DGIST is one of the four public universities in South Korea dedicated to research in science and technology, along with KAIST, GIST, and UNIST. Under the Special Act on Support of Scientists and Engineers for Strengthening National Science and Technology Competitiveness, the Korean government enacted the Daegu Gyeongbuk Institute of Science and Technology Act (Act No. 6996) and established DGIST as a research institute in 2004. In 2008, the act was amended to expand the institute's role to include both research and education, which eventually enabled DGIST's transition from a research institute to a university.

== History ==
In 2004, the Korean Government established DGIST as a research institute to promote national science and technology. It is located in Daegu to invigorate the local economy. The government amended the DGIST Act in 2008, enabling the institute to offer educational (degree) programs.

Kyu-Suk Chung, the first president of the institute, was appointed in 2004 when it was still a research institute. The second president was In Seon Lee, who was appointed in 2007. Dr. Sang Hyuk Son served as the third president starting in 2017. Dr. Young Kuk was appointed in 2019. The current president is Dr. Kunwoo Lee, who assumed office in December 2023.

December 11, 2003	Enacted DGIST Act (Act No. 6996), which created the legal basis for the establishment of DGIST
September 03, 2004	First President Kyu-Suk Chung was inaugurated (research institute)
September 07, 2004	Registered the establishment of DGIST as a research institute
September 03, 2007	Second President In-Seon Lee was inaugurated (research institute)
June 13, 2008	Amended the DGIST Act (Act No. 9108) to allow DGIST to offer its educational (degree) programs
May 8, 2009	DGIST Vision & University Identity Proclamation Ceremony
November 22, 2010	Moved campus to current site in Hyeonpung
February 25, 2011	Dr. Sung-Chul Shin was inaugurated as founding president of university
December 14, 2011	Established the Korea Brain Research Institute (KBRI), affiliated institute of DGIST
July 16, 2012	Established the DGIST-Lawrence Berkeley National Laboratory Joint Research Center
October 08, 2012	Established the Center for Plant Aging-Research, Institute for Basic Science (IBS)
October 30, 2012	Established the Cyber Physical Systems Global Center
February 26, 2015	Dr. Sung-Chul Shin was inaugurated as the second president of the university
April 01, 2015	Established DGIST Convergence Research Institute
April 19, 2016	Established Core Protein Resources Center
October 19, 2016	Established Well Aging Research Center
March 22, 2017	Dr. Sang Hyuk Son was inaugurated as the third president of university
April 01, 2019	Dr. Young Kuk was inaugurated as the fourth president of university
December 01, 2023	Dr. Kunwoo Lee was inaugurated as the fifth president of university

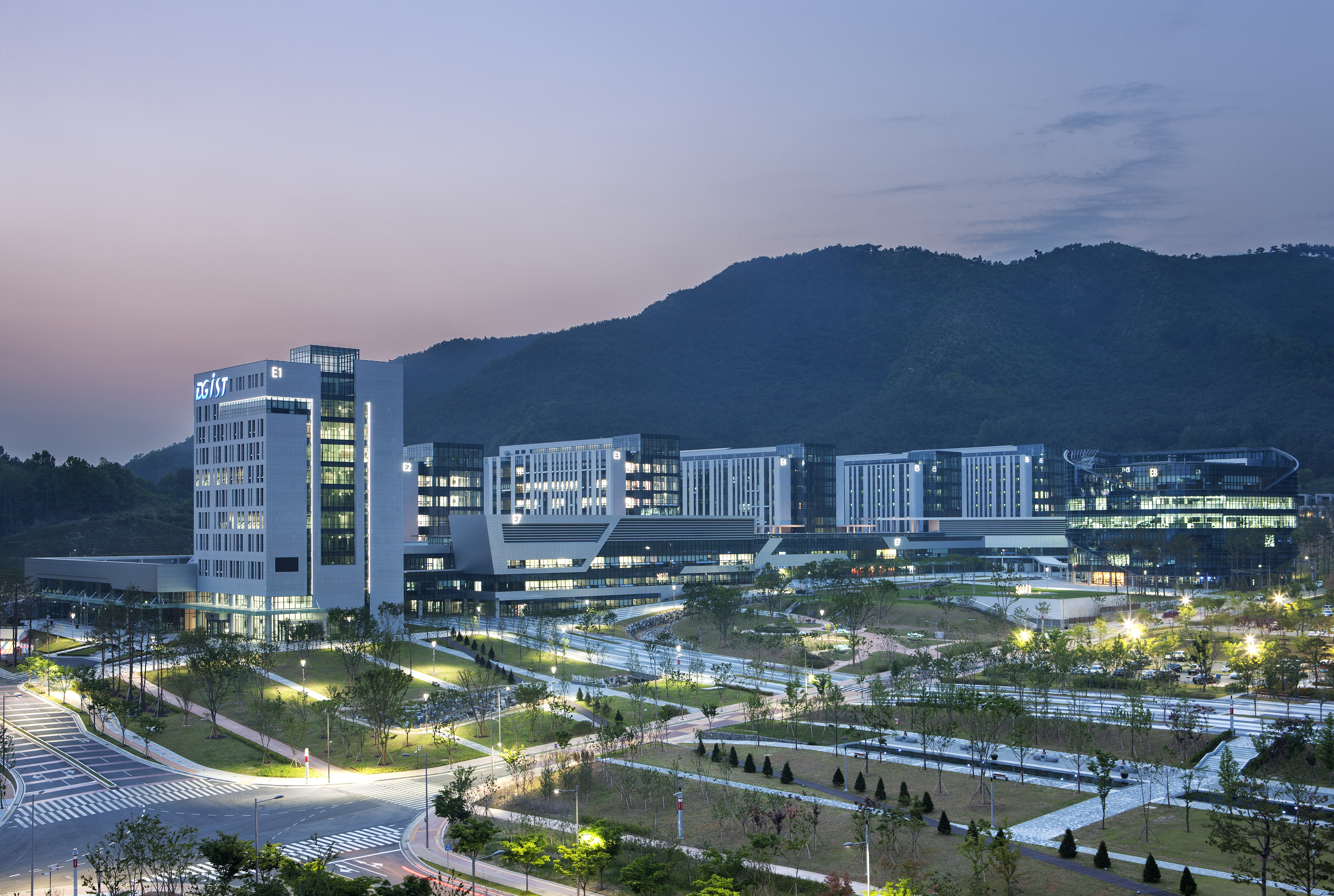
Night view of DGIST campus

== Academics ==
University rankings
QS National	General	11
THE National	General	11
QS Asia (Asia version)	General	90
THE Asia (Asia version)	General	71
QS World	General	385
THE World	General	351–400
THE World (Young)	General/Young	=33

The graduate program was established in 2011, followed by the opening of the School of Undergraduate Studies in 2014 under the College of Transdisciplinary Studies.

For the early 2026 undergraduate admissions cycle, DGIST recorded a competition ratio of 27.85 to 1. A total of 6,182 applications were submitted for 222 undergraduate positions, representing a 23.4% increase in applications compared to the previous year. DGIST has recorded the highest competition ratio among science and engineering universities for three consecutive years.

Under directive from the Ministry of Science and ICT, DGIST plans to establish a College of AI beginning in the spring semester of 2027. The college will focus on three main fields: Physical AI, AI-X, and Medical AI. The institution aims to enroll 100 undergraduate students during its launch semester, followed by an intake of 100 graduate students in the spring semester of 2028.

=== Undergraduate Program ===
A distinctive feature of DGIST's undergraduate program is its open academic structure. Students are not required to declare a specific major at the time of admission and are encouraged to explore multiple disciplines.

Degree options are available as a single major, a double major, or a combination of one major and one minor. Areas of study include fields in the natural sciences—such as physics, chemistry, life science, and brain sciences—and in engineering, including mechanical engineering, electronics engineering, chemical engineering, computer science and engineering, and materials science and engineering.

Natural Sciences Tracks

- Physics: Physics, Semiconductor Physics, Applied Physics, Optics, Quantum Information Science, Biophysics
- Chemistry: Collaborative research centered upon chemistry
- Life Science: Food Security and Eco-Plants, Disease Control and Aging Management, Multiomics and AI Bioinformatics
- Brain Sciences: (track established in 2025)

Engineering Tracks

- Mechanical Engineering: Robotic Mechanics, Robotic Electronics, Robotic Intelligence
- Electronic Engineering: Artificial Intelligence, Computer Science Field, Electrical and Electronic Devices and Circuits, EE Systems
- Chemical Engineering: Solar Energy Conversion, Fuel Cells & Electrolyzers, Batteries, Modeling & Simulation, Catalyst Engineering, Energy Harvesting, Displays & Soft Electronics
- Computer Engineering: Artificial Intelligence, Computer Science Field, Electrical and Electronic Devices and Circuits, EE Systems
- Materials Science and Engineering: New Materials, Biomaterials, Nano Materials, Functional Materials, Flexible Materials

Self-Designed Track

DGIST offers students the option to design individualized majors, allowing them to incorporate courses from DGIST as well as online courses or programs from other institutions. This approach enables a flexible and customized educational experience.

=== Graduate Program ===
The Graduate School has been offering Master's and Doctoral Degree Programs, including integrated MS-PhD programs.

Departments and Key Research Areas

- Department of Physics and Chemistry

Physics, Chemistry, Nano-Bio Convergence Materials, Creative Materials Theory

- Department of Electrical Engineering and Computer Science

Intelligent Computing Systems, Connected Smart Systems, Advanced Semiconductor, Bio-Medical Systems, Cyber-Physical Systems

- Department of Robotics and Mechatronics Engineering

Robotic Systems, Mechatronics & Control, Soft Robotics, Microrobotics & MEMS, Wearable Devices, Artificial Intelligence, Robot Vision & Imaging

- Department of Energy Science and Engineering

Secondary Batteries & Fuel Cells, Catalysis & Fuel Cells, Semiconductor & Display, Energy Harvesting, Energy Computational Simulation

- Department of Brain Sciences

Neurodegeneration and Metabolism, Sensory Biology and Circadian Rhythm, Synapse Neuroscience, Neural Circuits and Behaviors, Computational Neuroscience, Biophysics and Quantum Biology, High-level Cognitive Neuroscience

- Department of New Biology

Biology of Aging (Plants, Ecology and Food Security, New Biotechnologies New Biomedicines

Interdisciplinary Studies

- Interdisciplinary Engineering of Interdisciplinary Studies

Intelligence Mobilities, Emerging Materials & Components Advanced Biotechnology

- Artificial Intelligence of Interdisciplinary Studies

Smart City, Manufacturing and Innovation, Bio-Medical

- Biomedical Science & Engineering of Interdisciplinary Studies

Mechanism and Therapeutic Research for Treatment of Intractable Human Diseases, Brain Engineering, Intelligent Medical Imaging Systems and Analysis, Medical Robotics and Therapeutic Support Systems

- Quantum Information Science of Interdisciplinary Studies

Quantum Computing, Quantum Sensing, Quantum Communication, Quantum Materials

Department of Advanced Technology

- Graduate School of Engineering Practice

== Research ==
=== DGIST Convergence Research Institute ===
- DGIST-LBNL Research Center for Emerging Materials
- Research Center for Resilient Cyber Physical Systems
- Convergence Research Center for Microlaser Technology
- DGIST-ETH Microrobotics Research Center
- Core Protein Resources Center
- Well Aging Research Center
- Global Center for Bio-Convergence Spin System
- Brain Engineering Convergence Research Center
- Magnetics Initiative Life Care Research Center
- Research Center for Extreme Exploitation of Dark Data
- Center for Proteome Biophysics
- Research Center for Thin Film Solar Cells
ICT Research Institute
- Division of Electronics & Information System
- Division of Automotive Technology
- Division of Intelligent Robot
Materials Research Institute
- Division of Energy Technology
- Division of Nanotechnology
- Division of Biotechnology

=== Research infrastructure ===
In addition to the DGIST Convergence Research Institute, DGIST has infrastructure to support and facilitate research.

Center for Technology Commercialization
- Tech Startup Promotion Team
- Technology Commercialization Team

Center for Technology Startup Education
- Technology Startup Education Team

== Notable Events ==
DGIST was one of the hosts of the “World Engineering Education Forum and Global Engineering Deans Council (WEEF & GEDC) 2025,” held from September 21 to 25 at Daegu EXCO and DGIST campus. Co-hosted by the Korean Society for Engineering Education (KSEE), around 800 scholars gathered under the theme of “Engineering Education We Need.” WEEF & GEDC is one of the largest engineering education academic events, bringing together global engineering schools and industry stakeholders annually.

The forum was jointly organized by DGIST, KSEE, IFEES, and GEDC, with support from the Ministry of Science and ICT, the Ministry of Education, and Daegu Metropolitan City. Over 20 domestic and international companies and organizations—including Korea Circuit, iM Bank, Dassault Systèmes, LG Chem, Hyosung Heavy Industries, MathWorks, Celltrion, and Siemens—served as sponsors, supporting the forum's aim to promote collaboration between academia and industry.

In May 2026, DGIST hosted the Asian Engineering Deans' Summit (AEDS 2026) on its campus. The event focused on "Innovation in Engineering Education Utilizing AI," bringing together deans and representatives from 17 engineering universities across 9 Asian countries to discuss AI-driven transformations in education, future talent development strategies, and expanded inter-institutional cooperation.

== People ==
DGIST had 3,368 total members as of October 2026. Those include 2,381 of students enrolled for the 2026 school year (1,182 Undergraduates, 475 Master's program students, 226 Ph.D. program students, 449 Integrated MS-PhD Program students and 49 Combined Undergraduate-Graduate Program). They also include 286 faculty, 308 researchers, and 393 of administrative staff working at DGIST.

DGIST has a total of 3,003 alumni, comprising 1,318 bachelor's, 1,119 master's, and 566 doctoral degree recipients (July 2026).

== Presidents ==
- Chung Kyu-Suk (2004–2007) 1st president of DGIST research institute
- Lee In-Seon (ko) (2007–2011) 2nd president of DGIST research institute
- Shin Sung-chul (2011–2017) 1st and 2nd president of DGIST University
- Son Sang Hyuk (2017–2018) 3rd president of DGIST University
- Kuk Young (2019–2023) 4th president of DGIST University
- Lee Kunwoo (2023–current) 5th president of DGIST University

== See also ==
- List of national universities in South Korea
- List of universities and colleges in South Korea
- Education in Korea
