= Neutrophil collagenase =

Identifiers
- EC no.: 3.4.24.34
- CAS no.: 2593923

Databases
- IntEnz: IntEnz view
- BRENDA: BRENDA entry
- ExPASy: NiceZyme view
- KEGG: KEGG entry
- MetaCyc: metabolic pathway
- PRIAM: profile
- PDB structures: RCSB PDB PDBe PDBsum
Search
- PMC: articles
- PubMed: articles
- NCBI: proteins

Neutrophil collagenase (EC 3.4.24.34, matrix metalloproteinase 8, PMNL collagenase, MMP-8) is an enzyme. This enzyme catalyses the following chemical reaction

Cleavage of interstitial collagens in the triple helical domain. Unlike EC 3.4.24.7, interstitial collagenase, this enzyme cleaves type III collagen more slowly than type I

This enzyme belongs to the peptidase family M10.

== See also ==
- Collagenase
