= Asan Award in Medicine =

South Korean annual award

- Country: South Korea
- First award: 2008
- Website: Asan Foundation

- Asan Award in Medicine
- Hangul: 아산의학상
- Hanja: 峨山醫學賞
- RR: Asan uihaksang
- MR: Asan ŭihaksang

The Asan Award in Medicine (frequently written as the ASAN Award in Medicine; Korean: 아산의학상) is an annual medical award presented by the Asan Foundation. Not to be confused with their other prize, the ASAN Award, which is given for volunteer work, nor the Asan Memorial Poetry Prize given by the Asan Memorial Association in memory of Malayalam poet Kumaran Asan. Established in 2007, the Asan Award in Medicine is presented in the categories of Basic Medicine, Clinical Medicine, and Young Medical Scientists who are under the age of 40. For the first five years there was a singular laureate but now there is laureate for basic and clinical and up to three young scientists laureates.

== History ==
Raised in 2013 to encourage medical research, prize money for the first two categories is 300 million KRW, and for found scientists it is 50 million KRW each. While the Foundation's website mentions the award is given to "medical scientists devoting themselves to the country’s medical development", the Award's website mentions the honor can be presented to medical scientists of any citizenship who "have made contributions to the development of Korea's medical science." International recipients receive their prize money in US$250,000.

=== Recipients ===
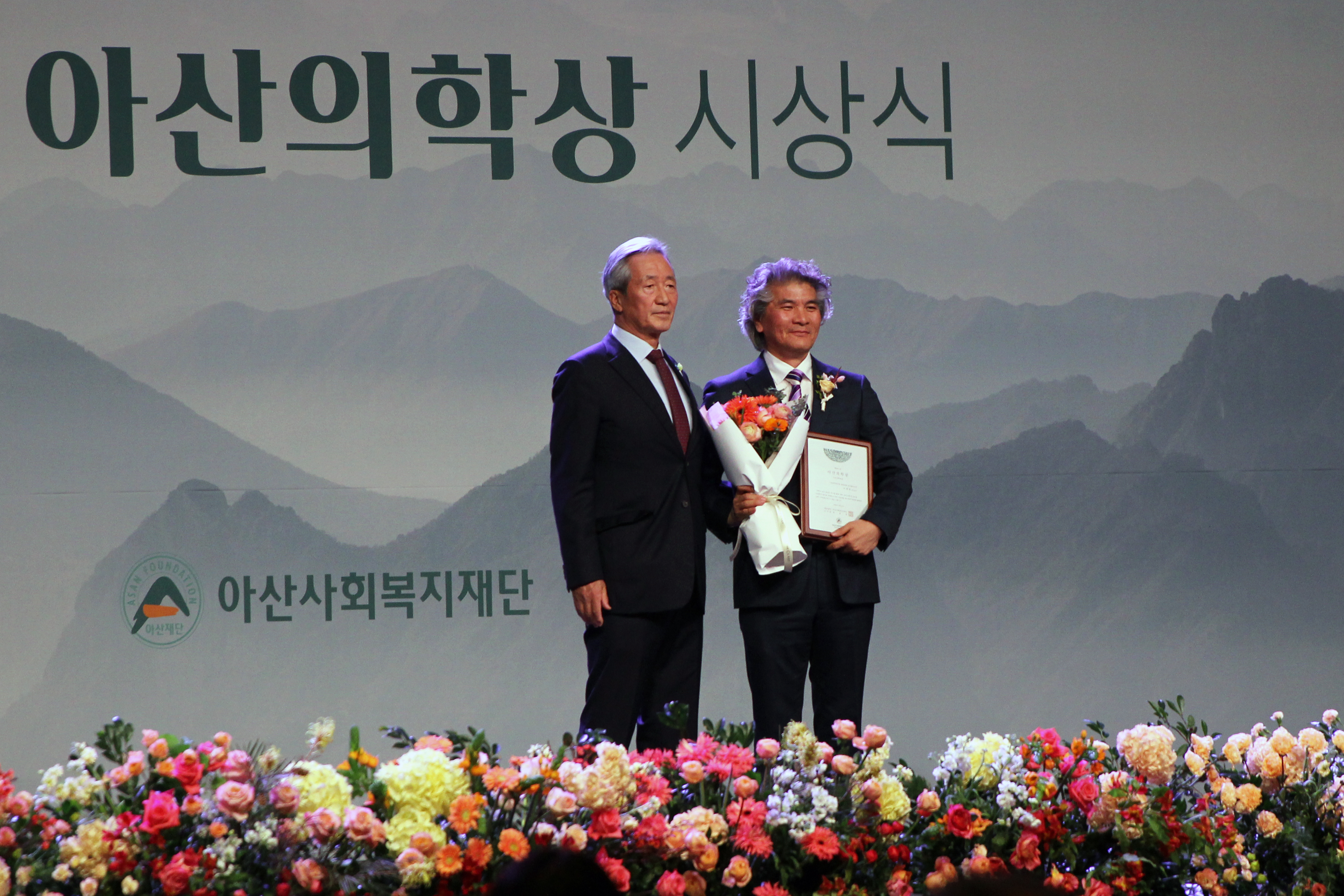
Changjoon Justin Lee (right) receiving the 2024 Asan Award in Medicine in Basic Medicine.

The award has been given to the following individuals.

Year	Laureate		
2008	Kim Hyo-Soo (김효수)		
2009	Koh Jae-Young (고재영)		
2010	Lee Sung-Gyu (이승규)		
2011	Park Seung-jung (박승정)		
2012	Koh Gou Young (고규영)		
Year	Basic Medicine	Clinical Medicine	Young Medical Scientists
2013	Chung Jongkyeong (정종경)	Kwon Jun Soo (권준수)	Lee Jeong Ho (이정호); Kim Sung-Han (김성한)
2014	Suh Pann-Ghill (서판길)	Lee Kyung Soo (이경수)	Ko Jaewon (고재원); Park Duk-Woo (박덕우)
2015	Park Jong-Wan (박종완)	Lee Myung-Shik (이명식)	Kim Hyongbum (김형범); Park Jeong-Yeol (박정열)
2016	Oh Byung-Ha (오병하)	Roberto Romero (로베르토 로메로)	Cho Seung-woo (조승우); Kim Joon Bum (김준범)
2017	Kim Jin-Soo (김진수)	Han Duck Jong (한덕종)	Choi Jung Kyoon (최정균); Ahn Jung-min (안정민)
2018	Kim Eunjoon (김은준)	Bang Yung-Jue (방영주)	Kim Ho Min (김호민); Kim Beom Kyung (김범경)
2019	Kim V. Narry (김빛내리)	Kim Jong Sung (김종성)	Han Buhm (한범); Lee Eun Ji (이은지)
2020	Lee Wonjae (이원재)	Lee Jaewon (이재원)	Ju Yeongseok (주영석); Lee Yongho (이용호)
2021	Ronald M. Evans (로날드 에반스)	Koo Bon-Kwon (구본권)	Kim Jin-Hong (김진홍); Yoo Changhoon (유창훈)
2022	Shin Eui-Cheol (신의철)	Lee Jeong Min (이정민)	Kim Sung-Yon (김성연); Suh Chong Hyun (서종현)
2023	Chun Jang-Soo (전장수)	Kang Yoon-Koo (강윤구)	Jeong Choongwon (정충원); Park Sehoon (박세훈)
2024	Changjoon Justin Lee (이창준)	Kim Wonyeong (김원영)	Jeong Ingyeong (정인경); Oh Takgyu (오탁규)
2025	Karl Deisseroth (칼 다이서로스)	Ahn Myung-Ju (안명주)	Park YongKeun (박용근); Choi Hongyoon (최홍윤)
2026	Lee Ho-Young (이호영)	Kim Seung-Up (김승업)	Martin Steinegger (마틴 슈타이네거); Lee Ju-Myung (이주명)

== See also ==
- Asan Medical Center
- Gangneung Asan Hospital
- Ho-Am Prize in Medicine
