= Song Ho-young =

South Korean radiologist

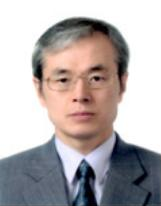
- 송호영 교수
- Born: April 20, 1954 (age 72); Seoul, South Korea
- Education: Jeonbuk National University (March 1973 – February 1975)
- Known for: Non-vascular stent Founder of SGI (Society of Gastrointestinal Intervention)
- Scientific career
- Fields: Department of Radiology
- Workplaces: Asan Medical Center
- Doctoral advisor: Hyung-Rho Kim

Song Ho-young (born April 20, 1954) is a South Korean radiologist. He studied at the Jeonbuk National University (March 1973 – February 1975) and now works at the Asan Medical Center. He is the founder of the Society of Gastrointestinal Intervention (SGI).

== Education ==
He received an undergraduate degree from the College of Liberal Art sand Science Jeonbuk National University in 1973, followed by an MD from the College of Medicine - Jeonbuk National University in 1975. He then did an internship and a radiology residency at the Jeonbuk National University Hospital. In 1982 he received an M.S.from the Graduate School of Jeonbuk National University; in 1987, he received a Ph.D. from that university.

== Academic and professional career ==
From 1986 to 1993 Song was on the faculty ofc Jeonbuk National University Medical School, rising in rank from Instructor to Associate Professor. From 1993 to the present he has been a member of the faculty of Asan Medical Center University of Ulsan College of Medicine, rising in rank from Associate Professor to Professor; he has served as the Chairman, Department of Radiology.

He has been a visiting professor at the University of Tokyo M.D. Anderson Cancer Center, the University of Pennsylvania, Oregon Health Sciences University, Louisiana State University Medical School, University of Lund, Sweden, Minimally Invasive Surgery Centre, Caceres, Spain, and Osaka City University.

From 1996 to 2000 he was Editor-in-Chief of the Journal of the Korean Interventional Radiological Society.

== Society memberships and offices ==
- Korean Radiological Society (1983–present)
- Korean Society of Medical Ultrasound (1983–present) Korean Society of Cardiovascular Interventional Radiology (1994–present)
- Korean Bronchoesophagological Society (2002–present)
- Korean Society of Medical Biochemistry and Melecular Biology (1998–present)
- Radiological Society of NorthAmerica (1989–present)
- Cardiovascular and Interventional Radiological Society of Europe (CIRSE) (1999–present)
- Korean Institute of Medicine (May 2004 – present)
- Society of Interventional Radiology, US (2006–present)
- Society of Gastrointestinal Intervention, (2007–present); President, 2010-2011

== Notable awards ==
- Outstanding Korean in 1996, President Kim Young-sam appointments (December 13, 1996)
- Top Scientist and Technologist Award of Korea, President Lee Myung-bak and Korean Federation of Science and Technology Societies (ko) (April 21, 2008)
- Honorary Membership of the European Society of Radiology (ESR) (March 6, 2009)
- Honorary Membership of the Radiological Society of North America (RSNA), (November 30, 2009)
- Outstanding Korean in 1996, President Kim Young-sam appointments (December 13, 1996)
- Bayer Clinical Medicine Award (November 2015)
