= Ronald Raines =

Ronald Raines may refer to:

- Ron Raines (born 1949), American actor known for the role of Alan Spaulding on Guiding Light
- Ronald T. Raines (born 1958), American chemical biologist and professor at the Massachusetts Institute of Technology
- Ronald Raines (politician) (born 1929), Australian politician
