= Keum Na-na =

South Korean model

Keum Nana (금나나, born 1983) is a South Korean academic, author, and beauty pageant titleholder who the winner of Miss Korea 2002 and participated in Miss Universe 2003. A graduate of Harvard University, she has a doctorate degree in nutrition and epidemiology from Harvard and was appointed an assistant professor at Dongguk University in Seoul in 2017. She is an honorary ambassador of the ASEAN–Korea Centre.

== Education ==
Nana graduated from Kyeongbuk Science High School in Pohang. She then attended but dropped out of Kyungpook National University School of Medicine in pursuit of undergraduate studies at Harvard University. She graduated from Harvard University in 2008, where she majored in Biochemistry. She then earned her master's degree in nutritional science at Columbia University while preparing her U.S. medical school applications. Nana Keum graduated from Harvard's TH Chan School of Public Health with a dual-doctorate in nutrition and epidemiology in 2015. She is currently a postdoctoral fellow at the TH Chan School of Public Health under the mentorship of Edward Giovannucci. She has published numerous peer-reviewed research papers and specializes in meta-analyses.

== Bibliography ==
She is the author of the Korean language books 나나 너나 할 수 있다 (Everyone Can Do It), 공부일기 (Study Diary), 나나의 네버엔딩 스토리 (Nana's Never Ending Story).

Preceded by Kim Min-kyung	Miss Korea; 2002	Succeeded by Choi Yoon-young
