= Park Seung-jung =

South Korean scientist

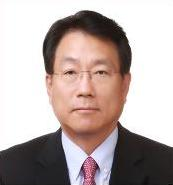
- Born: Seoul, South Korea
- Education: Yonsei University
- Awards: 2005 The Ethica Award Presented by EuroPCR, 2008 TCT Award (Career Achievement Award), 2011 Top Scientist and Technologist Award of Korea, 2011 Asan Award in Medicine, 2020 Ho-Am Prize in Medicine
- Scientific career
- Fields: Cardiology
- Workplaces: University of Ulsan; Asan Medical Center

- Park Seung-jung
- Hangul: 박승정
- RR: Bak Seungjeong
- MR: Pak Sŭngjŏng

Park Seung-jung is a South Korean cardiologist. Currently he is chairman of the Heart Institute at Asan Medical Center in Seoul and professor of medicine at University of Ulsan.

== Career ==
Park is currently serving as a Chairman of Board of Trustees at CardioVascular Research Foundation, and as a course director, he has been organizing the annual conference, CardioVascular Summit-TCT Asia Pacific, since 1996.

- 1996 - Advisory Board Asian-Pacific Society of Interventional Cardiology
- 1996 - Associate Professor of Medicine Chief, Division of Interventional Cardiology Cardiovascular Center, Asan Medical Center University of Ulsan, College of Medicine, Seoul, Korea
- 1998 - Editorial Board Interventional Cardiology Bulletin
- 2000 - Professor of Medicine Chief, Division of Interventional Cardiology Cardiovascular Center, Asan Medical Center University of Ulsan College of Medicine, Seoul, Korea
- 2002 - Chairman Cardio Vascular Research Foundation
- 2004 - Editorial Board Current Cardiology Reviews
- 2004 - Editorial Advisory Future Cardiology
- 2004.3 - 2008.2 Chairman The Korean Society of Interventional Cardiology
- 2004.12 - Director Clinical Research Center for Ischemic Heart Disease
- 2006 - 2008 President Asian Pacific Society of Interventional Cardiology
- 2006.09 - Director Asan Heart Institute
- 2006 - 2010 Editorial Board Catheterization and Cardiovascular Interventions
- 2008.02 - Associate Editor for the Pacific Rim Euro Intervention
- 2008.02 - Editorial Board Journal of American College of Cardiology: Cardiovasular Interventions
- 2008.07 - 2010 International Advisory Board Circulation Journal-The Japanese Circulation Society
- 2008 - 2010 Editorial Board The American Journal of Cardiology
- 2009 - 2011 International Associate Editor European Heart Journal
- 2009 - 2011 Associate Editor Interventional Cardiology
- 2009 - 2010 Director, International Affairs Committee The Korean Society of Cardiology
- 2009.7 - International Associate Editor Circulation Journal - The Japanese Circulation Society
- 2009.11.23 - Chairman Heart Institute, Asan Medical Center

== Grants and awards ==
- 1991 - 1993 NSF grant DMS-9106444
- 1997 - 2001 NSF grant DMS-9701489 :‘Effective Diophantine Geometry over FunctionFields’.
- 1998 - 2002 NSF Group Infrastructure Grant : ‘Southwestern Center for Arithmetic Geometry’, Co-PI with six other researchers from the University of Arizona, UTexas Austin, USC, and the University of New Mexico.
- 2003 - 2006 NSF Infrastructure grant : ‘Southwestern Center for Arithmetic Geometry’, Co-PI with nine other researchers from the University of Arizona, UTexas Austin, USC, UC Berkeley, and the University of New Mexico.
- 2005 - 2008 NSF grant DMS-0500504 : ‘Motivic fundamental groups, multiple polylogarithms, and Diophantine geometry’.
- 2006 - 2008 Japan Society for the Promotion of Science, Core-to-Core program ‘New Developments of Arithmetic Geometry, Motive, Galois Theory, and Their Practical Applications,’ Foreign member
- 2008 EPSRC grant, 46437, for workshop ‘Non-commutative constructions in arithmetic and geometry’
- 2009 EPSRC grant, EP/G024979/1, 3-year project on ‘Non-commutative fundamental groups in Diophantine geometry’, March

== Awards ==
- 2021: Asian Scientist 100, Asian Scientist
- 2020: Ho-Am Prize in Medicine
- 2011: Asan Award in Medicine
- 2011: Top Scientist and Technologist Award of Korea, Korean Federation of Science and Technology Societies (ko)
- 2008: TCT Award (Career Achievement Award)
- 2005: The Ethica Award, EuroPCR
