= Kim Ho Min =

South Korean biologist

- 김호민
- Education: KAIST
- Awards: National R&D Excellence 100 (2018), Asan Award in Medicine for Young Medical Scientists (2018), Young Scientist Award (2018), Agarwal Award (2009)
- Scientific career
- Fields: Leucine-rich repeat, cryo-EM, structure-based protein engineering, crystallography, structural biology
- Workplaces: KAIST, University of California, San Francisco, Institute for Basic Science
- Theses: Studies on a mouse gene encoding a protein homologous to acid ceramidase (2001); Crystal structure of the BAFF-BAFFR complex and its implications for receptor activation, crystal structure of drosophila angiotensin I-converting enzyme bound to captopril and lisinopril (2005)
- Doctoral advisors: Yoo Ook-Joon and Lee Jie-Oh

Korean name
- Hangul: 김호민
- RR: Gim Homin
- MR: Kim Homin
- Website: KAIST profile

Kim Ho Min (Korean: 김호민) is a biologist and professor in both the Graduate School of Medical Science & Engineering and the Department of Biological Science of KAIST. He was also the chief investigator of the Protein Communication Group in the Center for Biomolecular and Cellular Structure in the Institute for Basic Science in Daejeon from 2018. As part of the World Research Hub Initiative, he was a visiting professor at the Tokyo Institute of Technology.

== Education ==
Kim's formal study of science started at Dongji Middle School and Kyeongbuk Science High School in 1993. Finishing high school in two years, he went to the Department of Biological Science in KAIST, where he completed his Bachelor of Science, Master of Science, and doctorate. His advisors were Yoo Ook-Joon and Lee Jie-Oh, the former of which paid for Kim's doctoral studies.

== Career ==
He completed three postdoctoral fellows with the first two occurring at KAIST. From 2005, he worked in the Biomedical Research Center under Professor Yoo Ook Joon and then in the Department of Chemistry under Professor Lee Jie-oh. Moving to the US, his final postdoctoral fellowship was in the Department of Biophysics and Biochemistry, University of California, San Francisco under Professor Cheng Yifan. In 2011, he returned to Korea to set up the Disease Molecule Biochemistry Lab in the Graduate School of Medical Science and Engineering (GSMSE) of KAIST. In GSMSE, he started as an assistant professor and later became an associate professor. He has also worked as an adjunct professor in the Department of Biological Science and KI for Biocentury, both in KAIST.

In December 2018, he was selected to the chief investigator of the Protein Communication Group in the new Center for Biomolecular and Cellular Structure in the headquarters of the Institute for Basic Science. His group utilized structural biology techniques and biochemical and cell-biological approaches to research molecular mechanisms of various protein complexes related to immune response and synaptogenesis. The four core facilities in his research group were the Protein Expression Core, High-performance Cryo-EM Core, Protein Crystallization Core, and Computing core for Cryo-EM Image Processing.

== Awards and honors ==
- 2018: National R&D Excellence 100, Ministry of Science and ICT
- 2018: Asan Award in Medicine for Young Medical Scientists, Asan Foundation
- 2018: Young Scientist Award, Korean Academy of Science and Technology
- 2017: KAIST Top 10 Representative Researches Award, KAIST
- 2017: Award for Academic Excellence, KAIST
- 2015: Ewon Assistant Professor, KAIST
- 2009: Agarwal Award, BMRC, KAIST
- 2007: Young Scientist Award, Ministry of Science and Technology

== Selected publications ==
1. Park, Beom Seok; Song, Dong Hyun; Kim, Ho Min; Choi, Byong-Seok; Lee, Hayyoung; Lee, Jie-Oh (April 2009). "The structural basis of lipopolysaccharide recognition by the TLR4–MD-2 complex". Nature. 458 (7242): 1191–1195. Bibcode:2009Natur.458.1191P. doi:10.1038/nature07830. PMC 1871519. PMID 19252480. S2CID 4396446.
2. Jin, Mi Sun; Kim, Sung Eun; Heo, Jin Young; Lee, Mi Eun; Kim, Ho Min; Paik, Sang-Gi; Lee, Hayyoung; Lee, Jie-Oh (21 September 2007). "Crystal structure of the TLR1-TLR2 heterodimer induced by binding of a tri-acylated lipopeptide". Cell. 130 (6). Cell Press: 1071–1082. doi:10.1016/j.cell.2007.09.008. PMID 17889651. S2CID 10992433.
3. Kim, Ho Min; Park, Beom Seok; Kim, Jung-In; Kim, Sung Eun; Lee, Judong; Oh, Se Cheol; Enkhbayar, Purevjav; Matsushima, Norio; Lee, Hayyoung; Yoo, Ook Joon; Lee, Jie-Oh (7 September 2007). "Crystal structure of the TLR4-MD-2 complex with bound endotoxin antagonist Eritoran". Cell. 130 (5). Cell Press: 906–917. doi:10.1016/j.cell.2007.08.002. PMID 17803912. S2CID 18948568.
4. Lim, Jae Seok; Kim, Woo-il; Kang, Hoon-Chul; Kim, Se Hoon; Park, Ah Hyung; Park, Eun Kyung; Cho, Young-Wook; Kim, Sangwoo; Kim, Ho Min; Kim, Jeong A.; Kim, Junho; Rhee, Hwanseok; Kang, Seok-Gu; Kim, Heung Dong; Kim, Daesoo; Kim, Dong-Seok; Lee, Jeong Ho (23 March 2015). "Brain somatic mutations in MTOR cause focal cortical dysplasia type II leading to intractable epilepsy". Nature Medicine. 21 (4). Nature Publishing Group: 395–400. doi:10.1038/nm.3824. PMID 25799227. S2CID 9919578.
5. Koh, Young Jun; Kim, Hak-Zoo; Hwang, Seong-Ik; Lee, Jeung Eun; Oh, Nuri; Jung, Keehoon; Kim, Minah; Kim, Kyung Eun; Kim, Homin; Lim, Nam-Kyu; Jeon, Choon-Ju; Lee, Gyun Min; Jeon, Byeong Hwa; Nam, Do-Hyun; Sung, Hoon Ki; Nagy, Andras; Yoo, Ook Joon; Koh, Gou Young (17 August 2010). "Double antiangiogenic protein, DAAP, targeting VEGF-A and angiopoietins in tumor angiogenesis, metastasis, and vascular leakage". Cell. 18 (2). Cell Press: 171–184. doi:10.1016/j.ccr.2010.07.001. PMID 20708158.
