= Marcia Haigis =

American biologist

Marcia Carmen Haigis
- Born: Las Vegas
- Education: University of New Hampshire; University of Wisconsin–Madison
- Scientific career
- Workplaces: Massachusetts Institute of Technology; Harvard Medical School
- Thesis: Dissecting the mechanisms of a toxic ribonuclease (2002)
- Academic advisors: Ronald T. Raines; Leonard P. Guarente
- Doctoral students: Lydia W. S. Finley

Marcia Carmen Haigis is an American biologist and professor in the Department of Cell Biology at Harvard Medical School. Her research looks to understand the metabolic circuitry of mitochondria, and how it impacts human health and disease. She was elected to the National Academy of Medicine in 2024.

== Early life and education ==
Haigis was born in Las Vegas and moved to South Korea as a child. Her father was an officer in the United States Air Force. Haigis spent her early life moving between Nebraska and Alabama, before settling in Portsmouth, New Hampshire. She was a freshman at the University of New Hampshire. Here she trained as an emergency medical technician, accumulating hours of experience to be a member of the ambulance corps. During her undergraduate studies, Haigis discovered medical research, and spent her summers as a lab intern working on protein chemistry. Haigis trained in biochemistry with Ronald T. Raines at the University of Wisconsin–Madison. Her doctoral research looked to understand the cytotoxicity mechanisms of a ribonuclease. She learned a lot about protein folding and Sirtuin 1. She was a postdoctoral researcher at the Massachusetts Institute of Technology, where she specialized in mitochondrial metabolics with Leonard P. Guarente. Here she started working on SIRT3, SIRT4, and SIRT5. Amongst her many findings, she showed that SIRT4 repressed glutamate dehydrogenase 1, which suppressed insulin secretion.

== Research and career ==
Haigis looks to understand the role of mitochondria in human health. In particular, Haigis has studied how the enzymatic networks in the mitochondrion modulate a cell's metabolism. She joined the Harvard Medical School in 2006. One of her first graduate students, Lydia W. S. Finley, demonstrated that expression of genes critical to glycolysis was boosted when SIRT3 decreased. The SIRT3 gene is the most depleted in tumor cells – it drives cancel cell proliferation, and mice lacking in SIRT3 result in mice spontaneously developing breast tumors.

Haigis has demonstrated the role of mitochondrial sirtuins (a protein family involved in the regulation of biological processes) in metabolism and disease. She revealed that ammonia, a metabolic waste product that is lethal to most biological tissue, was used to boost the growth of cancer cells. She has shown that damage to DNA (which can accelerate cancer) activates the SIRT4 gene, and mice lacking SIRT4 developed spontaneous lung tumors. Her lab also demonstrated that prolyl-hydroxylase 3 (PHD3), a signaling enzyme, breaks down fats inside the mitochondrion, and is suppressed in a subset of cancers (including acute myeloid leukemia).

== Awards and honors ==
- Ellison Medical Foundation New Scholar Award
- Brookdale Foundation Leadership in Aging Award
- Elected to the National Academy of Medicine Emerging Leaders in Health and Medicine
- Elected to the National Academy of Medicine
- 2023 Ho-Am Prize in Medicine

== Select publications ==
- Sejal Vyas; Elma Zaganjor; Marcia C Haigis (1 July 2016). "Mitochondria and Cancer". Cell. 166 (3): 555–566. doi:10.1016/j.cell.2016.07.002. ISSN 0092-8674. PMC 5036969. PMID 27471965. Wikidata Q53198693.
- Marcia C Haigis; Raul Mostoslavsky; Kevin M Haigis; et al. (1 September 2006). "SIRT4 inhibits glutamate dehydrogenase and opposes the effects of calorie restriction in pancreatic beta cells". Cell. 126 (5): 941–954. doi:10.1016/j.cell.2006.06.057. ISSN 0092-8674. PMID 16959573. Wikidata Q24301843.
- Marcia C. Haigis; David A. Sinclair (2010). "Mammalian sirtuins: biological insights and disease relevance". Annual Review of Pathology: Mechanisms of Disease. 5: 253–95. doi:10.1146/annurev.pathol.4.110807.092250. ISSN 1553-4006. PMC 2866163. PMID 20078221. Wikidata Q29614496.
