= Charles Lee (scientist) =

Korean-Canadian geneticist (born 1969)

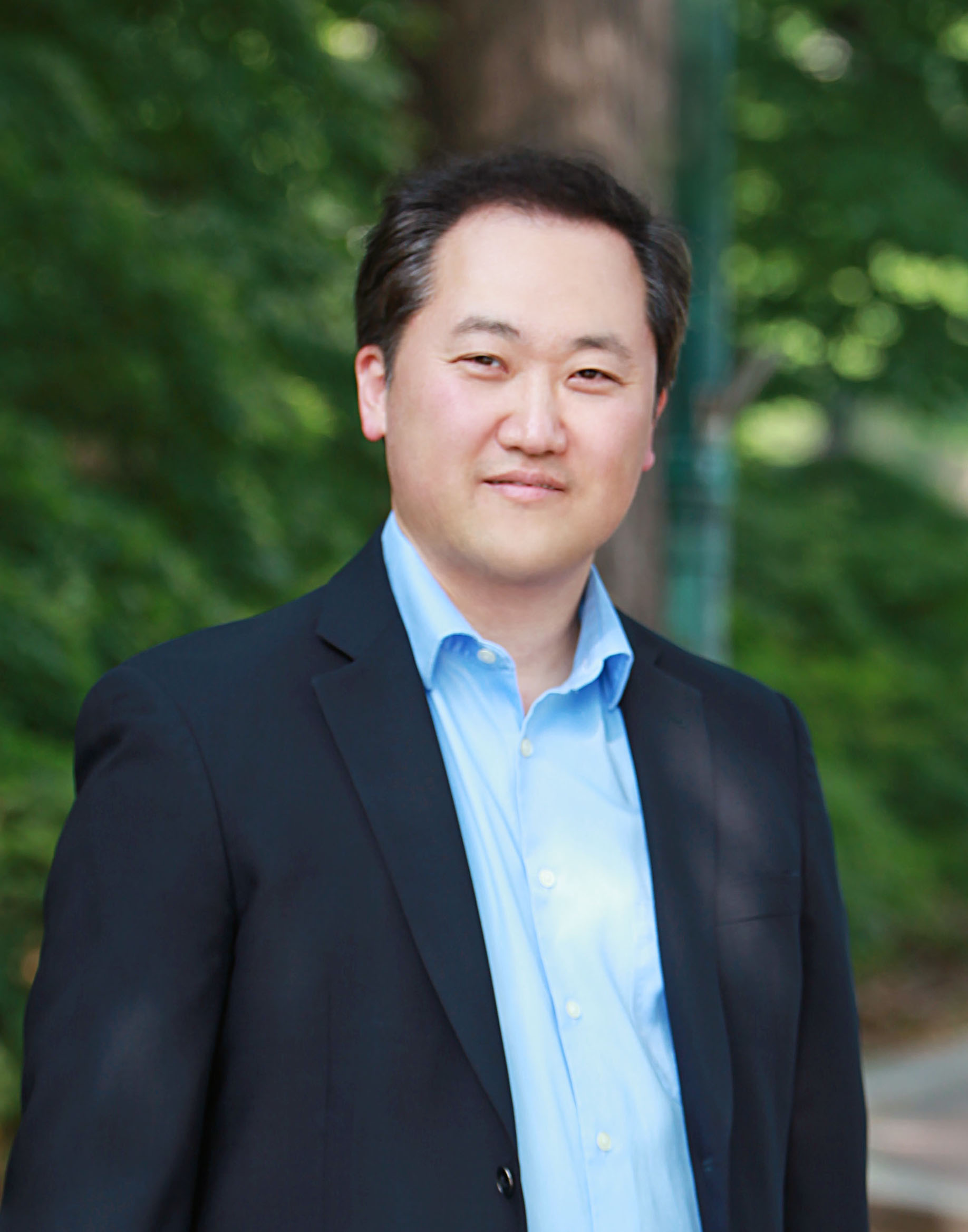
- Lee in 2015
- Education: University of Alberta
- Website: https://charlesleedna.org

Charles Lee is a scientist and academic. He is the Robert Alvine Family Endowed Chair. He is also a professor and clinical cytogeneticist with an active research program focused on the identification and characterization of structural genomic variants using advanced technology platforms. His laboratory was the first to describe genome-wide structural genomic variants (in the form of copy number variants (CNVs)) among humans with the subsequent development of genomic maps that are used in the diagnoses of array-based genetic tests.

== Education ==
Lee graduated from the University of Alberta with a BSc in 1990, an MSc in 1993, and a PhD in 1996. He also received a Distinguished Alumni award in 2018.

== Awards ==
- 2007: AACR Awards (AACR Team Science Award)
- 2008: Ho-Am Prize in Medicine
- 2014: Clarivate Citation Laureates in Physiology or Medicine
- 2024: Fellow of the Royal Society of Canada
