= Lydia W. S. Finley =

American biologist

- Awards: Searle Scholar
- Scientific career
- Fields: Metabolism, Stem Cell Biology
- Institutions: Memorial Sloan Kettering
- Doctoral advisor: Marcia Haigis
- Other academic advisors: Craig Thompson
- Website: https://www.mskcc.org/research/ski/labs/lydia-finley

Lydia W. S. Finley is an American scientist and an assistant member at the Cell Biology Program at Memorial Sloan Kettering Cancer Center and an assistant professor at Weill Cornell Medical College. Finley is known for her contributions to understanding the metabolic underpinnings of stem cell fate.

== Biography ==
Finley received her Bachelor of Science (BS) degree summa cum laude from Yale University. Finley completed her PhD at Harvard Medical School, where she worked in the laboratory of Marcia Haigis. Finley then worked as a postdoctoral fellow in the laboratory of Craig Thompson at Memorial Sloan Kettering Cancer Center. After completing her postdoctoral work, Finley opened her own laboratory in 2017, which is located in the Memorial Sloan Kettering Cancer Center.

Finley has received various awards for her work. These include the Dale F. Frey Award for Breakthrough Scientists from the Damon Runyon Cancer Research Foundation and the Searle Scholars Award. Finley currently serves as an associate editor for Cancer & Metabolism and a reviewing editor at eLife. As of April 2022, Finley has authored over 40 publications and has an h-index of 30.

== Scientific contributions ==
Finley's research has focused on interrogating the connections between metabolites and their role in regulating embryonic stem cell self-renewal and cell fate decisions. Notably, as a postdoctoral fellow, Finley and Bryce W. Carey discovered that intracellular α-ketoglutarate levels regulated chromatin and gene expression, and contributes to embryonic stem cell renewal. In 2022, Finley and co-authors published a paper describing a non-canonical arm of the TCA cycle.

== Selected awards and honors ==
- National Science Foundation Graduate Research Fellowship
- Dale F. Frey Award for Breakthrough Scientists, Damon Runyon Cancer Research Foundation
- 2018: Searle Scholar
- 2020: Pershing Square Sohn Cancer Research Alliance Award

== Selected publications ==
- Carey BW*, Finley LW*, Cross JR, Allis CD, Thompson CB. Intracellular α-ketoglutarate maintains the pluripotency of embryonic stem cells. Nature. 2015;518(7539):413-416. doi:10.1038/nature13981
- Arnold, PK; Jackson, BT; Paras, KI; Brunner, JS; Hart, ML; Newsom, OJ; Alibeckoff, SP; Endress, J; Drill, E; Sullivan, LB; Finley, LWS (2022). "A non-canonical tricarboxylic acid cycle underlies cellular identity". Nature. 603 (7901): 477–481. Bibcode:2022Natur.603..477A. doi:10.1038/s41586-022-04475-w. PMC 8934290. PMID 35264789.
