= Ronald T. Raines =

American chemical biologist (born 1958)

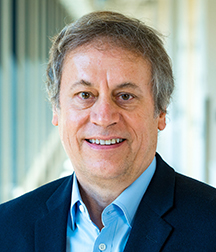
- Born: August 13, 1958 (age 68); Montclair, New Jersey
- Education: Massachusetts Institute of Technology
- Known for: Research on collagen, ribonucleases, protein chemistry, and biofuels
- Scientific career
- Fields: Chemical biology Organic chemistry Biochemistry; Biophysics; Biotechnology
- Workplaces: University of Wisconsin–Madison; Massachusetts Institute of Technology
- Thesis: Energetics of enzymatic catalysis: Triosephosphate isomerase
- Doctoral advisor: Jeremy R. Knowles
- Other academic advisors: William J. Rutter (postdoctoral); Christopher T. Walsh (undergraduate)
- Doctoral students: Marcia C. Haigis; Jin-Soo Kim; Luke D. Lavis
- Other notable students: Post-doc: Thimmaiah Govindaraju

Ronald T. Raines is an American chemical biologist. He is the Roger and Georges Firmenich Professor of Natural Products Chemistry at the Massachusetts Institute of Technology. He is a physical organic chemist with an interest in biology.

== Education ==
Raines was born and raised in the New Jersey suburbs of New York City. His father was a Ph.D. chemist, having worked with Charles O. Beckman at Columbia University. Raines graduated from West Essex High School in North Caldwell, New Jersey, where he was taught by award-winning chemistry teacher, Rex T. Morrison. He received Sc.B. degrees in chemistry and biology at the Massachusetts Institute of Technology, doing undergraduate research with Christopher T. Walsh on pyridoxal phosphate-dependent enzymes. He earned A.M. and Ph.D. degrees in chemistry at Harvard University for work with Jeremy R. Knowles on catalysis by triosephosphate isomerase. Also on his Ph.D. thesis committee were Walter Gilbert and Martin Karplus. Raines was a Helen Hay Whitney postdoctoral fellow with William J. Rutter in the Department of Biochemistry and Biophysics at the University of California, San Francisco, where he cloned and expressed the gene encoding bovine pancreatic ribonuclease.

== Career ==
Raines was a member of the faculty at the University of Wisconsin–Madison from 1989 until 2017. There, he was the Henry A. Lardy Professor of Biochemistry, Linus Pauling Professor of Chemical Biology, and a Professor of Chemistry. In 2009, he was a Visiting Associate in Chemistry at Caltech; in 2014, he was the Givaudan–Karrer Distinguished Visiting Professor at the Universität Zürich. In 2017, he returned to Cambridge, Massachusetts to join the faculty of his alma mater, MIT. He is also an Extramural Member of the Koch Institute for Integrative Cancer Research at MIT, an Affiliate Member of the MIT Institute for Medical Engineering and Science, and an Associate Member of the Broad Institute of MIT and Harvard. Altogether, he has published more than 450 peer-reviewed journal articles and mentored more than 120 graduate students and postdoctorates.

Raines and his coworkers have made the following contributions.

- Exploration of the conformational stability of collagen, which is the most abundant protein in animals. The resulting collagen-mimetic peptides are in preclinical trials for the detection and treatment of wounds and fibrosis. This work led to the discovery that n→π* interactions and C5 hydrogen bonds contribute to the stability of nearly every protein.
- Modifications of human RNA-cleaving enzymes to generate clinical anti-cancer therapies.
- Mechanistic studies on cellular redox homeostasis and on the uptake of cationic proteins and peptides by mammalian cells.
- New approaches to protein synthesis.
- Novel fluorogenic probes for molecular imaging in living cells.
- Methods to convert biomass into useful chemicals.

Raines has served on the editorial advisory boards of various journals and funding panels.

== Awards and honors ==
- Helen Hay Whitney Fellow, 1986–1989
- Searle Scholar Award, Chicago Community Trust, 1990–1993
- Presidential Young Investigator Award, National Science Foundation, 1990–1995
- Shaw Scientist Award, Milwaukee Foundation, 1991–1996
- Pfizer Award in Enzyme Chemistry, ACS, 1998
- Guggenheim Fellow, 2001–2002
- AAAS Fellow, 2002
- Arthur C. Cope Scholar Award, ACS, 2004
- Emil Thomas Kaiser Award, Protein Society, 2005
- Fellow, Royal Society of Chemistry, 2006
- Rao Makineni Lectureship, American Peptide Society, 2007
- Welch Lectureship, Welch Foundation, 2008
- Repligen Corporation Award in Chemistry of Biological Processes, ACS, 2010
- Jeremy Knowles Award, RSC, 2013
- Humboldt Research Award, 2015
- Ralph F. Hirschmann Award in Peptide Chemistry, ACS, 2016
- Fellow, National Academy of Inventors, 2016
- Vincent du Vigneaud Award, American Peptide Society, 2017
- Fellow, Royal Society of Biology, 2019
- Max Bergmann Medal, Max-Bergmann-Kreis, 2019
- Member, American Academy of Arts and Sciences, 2022
- Khorana Prize, RSC, 2022
- Biopolymers Murray Goodman Memorial Prize, ACS, 2022
- Undergraduate Teaching Prize, MIT School of Science, 2024
- AstraZeneca Protein and Peptide Science Award, RSC, 2025
- van 't Hoff Award Lectureship, Royal Netherlands Academy of Arts and Sciences, 2026
- Ronald Breslow Award for Achievement in Biomimetic Chemistry, ACS, 2027

== Sources ==
- Ronald T. Raines on LinkedIn
- MIT Department of Chemistry
