= V. Narry Kim =

South Korean biochemist (born 1969)

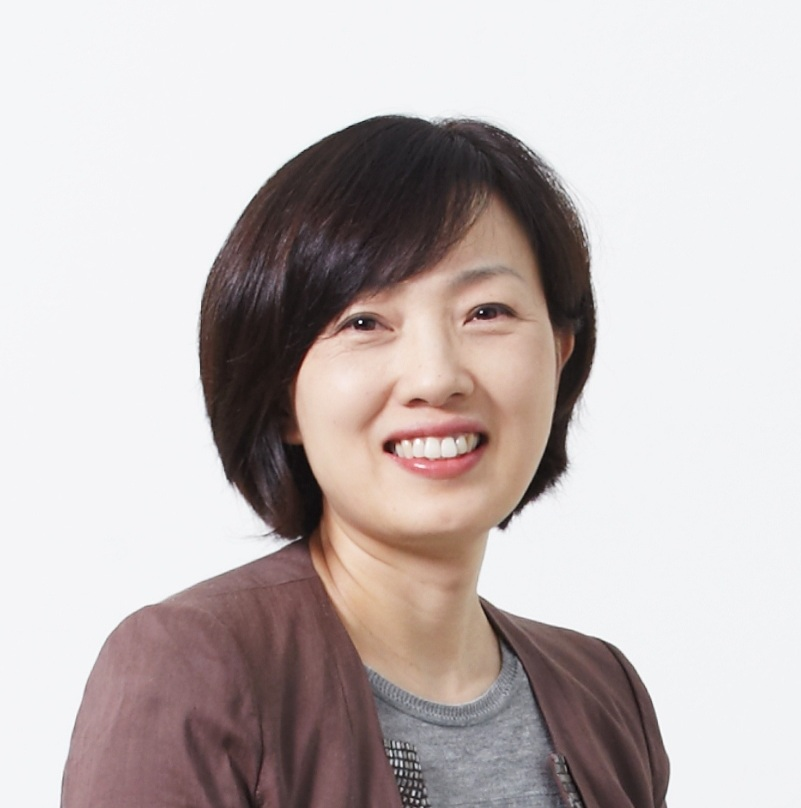
- V. Narry Kim
- Born: Vic Narry Kim; June 18, 1969 (age 57); Yeonggwang, South Jeolla, South Korea
- Education: Seoul National University; University of Oxford
- Known for: MicroRNA
- Awards: HFSP Nakasone Award (2027); Asan Award in Medicine (2019); Scientist of the Year Award (2016); S-Oil Leading Scientist of the Year (2013); Top Scientist and Technologist Award of Korea (2013); Amore Pacific the Grand Prize (2010); Ho-Am Prize in Medicine (2009); L'Oreal-UNESCO Women in Science Award (2008); Woman Scientist/Engineer of the Year Award (2007); Thomson Scientific Citation Laureate Award (2007)
- Scientific career
- Fields: Biochemistry, molecular biology
- Workplaces: Institute for Basic Science, Seoul National University
- Doctoral advisor: Alan J. Kingsman

Korean name
- Hangul: 김빛내리
- Hanja: 金빛내리
- RR: Gim Bitnaeri
- MR: Kim Pinnaeri
- Website: Narry Kim Lab

V. Narry Kim (Korean: 김빛내리; born 18 June 1969) is a South Korean biochemist and microbiologist, best known for her work on microRNA biogenesis. Her pioneering studies have laid the groundwork for the biology of microRNA and contributed to the improvement of RNA interference technologies.

== Background ==
Kim was born in South Korea in 1969. Kim first became interested in science as a high school student. When asked why she chose science as a lifelong career, she said, “I was charmed by the simplicity of the principles underlying the complexity of life.”

== Education ==
Kim went on to pursue a BA degree in microbiology, then followed by a MS degree in microbiology in 1992 and 1994, respectively, both from Seoul National University (SNU). After completing her masters under adviser Kang Sa-Ouk, Kim went to the United Kingdom to further her studies at the University of Oxford, studying the functions of retroviral proteins under Alan J. Kingsman. She graduated with a PhD in biochemistry in 1998.

== Career ==
Her academic journey then took her to the United States, where she took a position at the Howard Hughes Medical Institute at the University of Pennsylvania in Philadelphia as a research assistant. After completing her postdoctoral research on mRNA surveillance in the laboratory of Gideon Dreyfuss, Kim finished her postdoctoral studies and returned to Korea in 2001. She then started working at Seoul National University as a research assistant professor. By the age of 35, Kim already had twenty-two of her papers published in well known and prestigious scientific publications, such as Science and Nature. In addition, Kim “holds four patents based on her research activities, including one on a novel HIV-based gene delivery vector.”

In 2008, she became an associate professor, then a SNU Distinguished Fellow in 2010, and a full professor in 2013. Located in Seoul National University, she began working with the Institute for Basic Science (IBS) in 2012 as the founding director of the Center for RNA Research. her lab focuses on RNA-mediated gene regulation research, specifically investigating post-transcriptional gene regulation mediated by microRNAs (miRNAs). The lab employs biochemistry, molecular biology, genetic, biophysical, and computational approaches. Research is focused on miRNAs, which are small non-coding RNAs involved in practically all working aspects of eukaryotic cells. Tight control of miRNA is vital to normal functioning cells. If dysregulated, miRNAs can often be linked to human diseases such as cancer. By focusing on the miRNA biogenesis, Dr. Kim's lab has made major contributions to the understanding of miRNAs are created and processed in animal cells. These studies can potentially open the doors to new forms of cancer treatment and stem cell engineering.

In 2013, Kim, along with Professor Jin-Soo KIM of the SNU Department of Chemistry developed a new technology to eliminate specific microRNAs. This new technology has the promise of being potentially used to cure cancer and other illnesses in the future. In the research, TALENs (enzymes) were used to separate certain microRNA from a cell. TALENs had been used to create protein before, but this was the first time they have been used to separate microRNA. The team developed 540 different TALENs for this specific purpose. When this was applied to cancer cells, the proliferation rate of cancer cells dropped to one third of what it was. This discovery was published in the November 11, 2013 edition of Nature Structural and Molecular Biology.

Kim's first paper as PI was published in 2002 in the EMBO Journal. In this highly cited work, she defined two separate processing steps (primary microRNA (pri-miRNA) processing in the nucleus and pre-miRNA processing in the cytoplasm), and proposed a model of the microRNA biogenesis pathway for the first time. Based on this model, her research group discovered that most microRNA genes are transcribed by RNA polymerase II and that pri-miRNA processing is carried out by Drosha-DGCR8 complexes in the nucleus.

Her research group further identified uridylation-meditated pre-miRNA degradation pathway by LIN28 and TUT4, contributing to a better understanding of how microRNA-mediated gene expression regulation is involved in embryonic stem cell maintenance and cancer cell development. She also discovered the molecular basis for pri-miRNA recognition and cleavage by the Drosha-DGCR8 complexes, and pre-miRNA processing by Dicer. These findings suggested several critical points to be considered for designing more efficient short hairpin RNA (shRNA) vectors and also contributed to the improvement of RNA interference technologies.

The research team led by Narry Kim and Chang Hyeshik confirmed the predicted subgenomic RNAs of SARS-CoV-2 along with new RNA and dozens of unknown subgenomic RNAs. The interdisciplinary team was composed of virologists, microbiologists and computational scientists.

Kim received L'Oreal-UNESCO Award for Women in Science (2008), Ho-Am Prize in Medicine (2009) and Top Scientist and Technologist Award of Korea (2013). She is an active member of the RNA Society and the International Society of Stem Cell Research (ISSCR). In addition she has been recognized as one of the top Asian scientists to watch by Asian Scientist and among the "science stars of East Asia" by Nature. She was a Clarivate Analytics Highly Cited Researcher in the field of molecular biology and genetics in 2014.

== Work summary ==
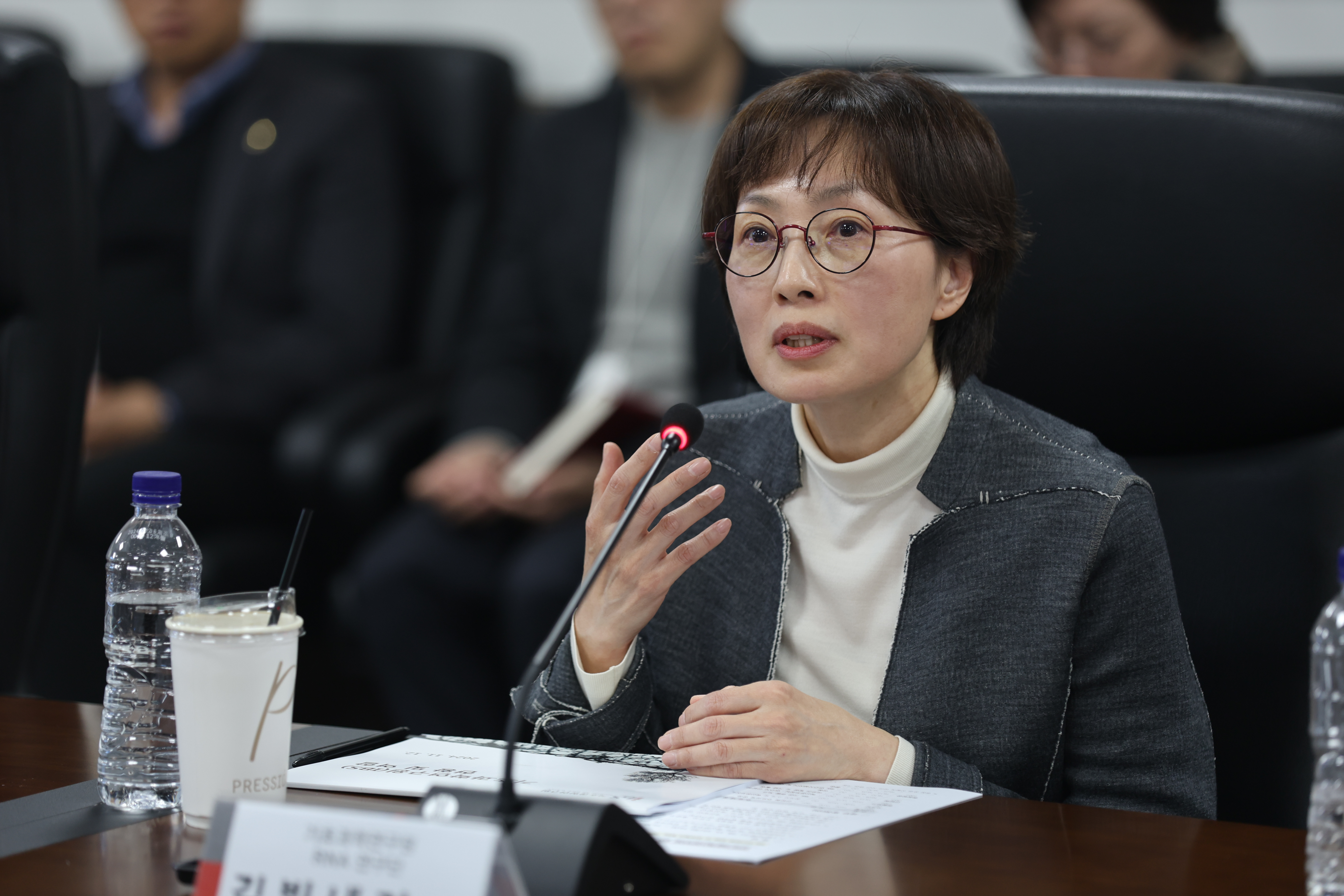
Kim speaking at a meeting in 2024.

Professional experience:

- 2013–present: Professor, Seoul National University
- 2012–present: Director, Center for RNA Research, Institute for Basic Science
- 2010–present: SNU Distinguished Fellow, Seoul National University
- 2008–2013: Associate Professor, Seoul National University
- 2004–2008: Assistant Professor, Seoul National University
- 2001–2004: Research Assistant Professor, Seoul National University
- 1999–2001: Postdoctoral fellow, Howard Hughes Medical Institute, University of Pennsylvania (with Gideon Dreyfuss)

Professional service:

- 2015–present: Board of Reviewing Editors, Science
- 2014–present: Foreign Associate, National Academy of Sciences (NAS)
- 2014–present: Editorial Board, Molecular Cell
- 2012–present: Member, The Korean Academy of Science Technology
- 2014: Organizer, Keystone Symposia
- 2013–2014: Council Member, Presidential Advisory Council on Science and Technology
- 2013–2014: Meetings Committee, The RNA Society
- 2013–present: Associate Member, European Molecular Biology Organization (EMBO)
- 2012–present: Editorial Board, Genes & Development
- 2011-2012: Director, The RNA Society
- 2011: Co-organizer, ISSCR-Cold Spring Harbor Asia Joint Meeting, Suzhou, China
- 2011–present: Editorial Board, The EMBO Journal
- 2011: Co-organizer, Keystone Symposia (RNA Silencing), Monterey, United States
- 2010–present: Editorial Board, Cell
- 2010–present: Member, Human Frontier Science Program Fellowship Review Committee
- 2010–2011: Director, The RNA Society
- 2009–present: Editorial Board, Cell Research
- 2009: Organizer, The 14th Annual Meeting of the RNA Society Meeting, Madison, United States
- 2008: Organizer, Seoul RNA Symposium, Seoul, South Korea
- 2007: Session Organizer and Publication Committee Member, FAOMB, Seoul, South Korea
- 2006–2008: Council Member, Presidential Advisory Council on Science and Technology, South Korea

== Awards ==
- 2027: HFSP Nakasone Award, Human Frontier Science Program
- 2025: Academic Award, Korean Society for Molecular and Cellular Biology
- 2024: Grand Prize, Lim Seong-ki Researcher Award, Lim Seong-gi Foundation
- 2021: Lina 50+ Award
- 2020: Korea's Top 5 Bio-Field Research Results and News, POSTECH Biological Research Information Center
- 2019: Asan Award in Medicine
- 2017: Chen Award
- 2016: KSMCB Award for Women in Life Science, Korean Society of Molecular and Cellular Biology
- 2016: Scientist of the Year Award, Korea Science Journalists Association
- 2014: Highly Cited Researcher in molecular biology & genetics category
- 2013: S-Oil Leading Scientist of the Year, S-Oil Science Prodigy and Culture Foundation, Korea
- 2013: Top Scientist and Technologist Award of Korea, Korean Federation of Science and Technology Societies (ko), Korea
- 2013: Gwanak Grand Prize Honor Sector, Seoul National University, Korea
- 2011: 100 Leaders in Korea, The Dong-a Ilbo
- 2010: National Scientist of the Republic of Korea, Ministry of Education, Science and Technology, Korea
- 2010: Amore Pacific the Grand Prize Amore Pacific and KOFWST, Korea
- 2009: Ho-Am Prize in Medicine, Ho-Am Foundation, Korea
- 2008: L'Oréal-UNESCO Awards for Women in Science, L'Oreal and UNESCO
- 2007: Woman Scientist/Engineer of the Year Award, Ministry of Science and Technology, Korea
- 2007: Young Scientist Award, Korean Academy of Science and Technology, Korea
- 2007: Thomson Scientific Citation Award, Thomson Corporation
- 2006: Research Award, Seoul National University, Korea
