= Eui-Cheol Shin =

South Korean immunologist (born 1971)

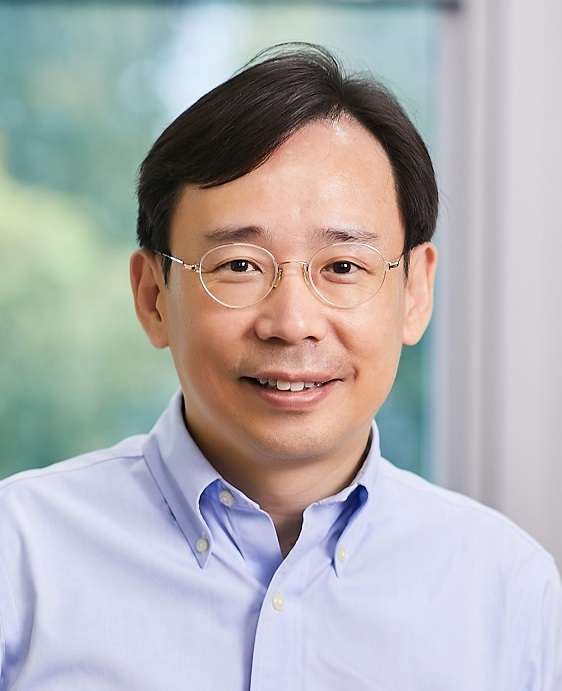
- Born: August 29, 1971 (age 55); Seoul, Korea
- Occupations: Medical immunologist, academic, and author

Academic background
- Education: Doctor of Medicine; M.S. Microbiology and Immunology; Ph.D. Microbiology and Immunology
- Alma mater: Yonsei University College of Medicine

Korean name
- Hangul: 신의철
- RR: Sin Uicheol
- MR: Sin Ŭich'ŏl

Eui-Cheol Shin (Korean: 신의철; born August 29, 1971) is a South Korean medical immunologist, academic, and author. He is a professor at the Graduate School of Medical Science and Engineering at the Korea Advanced Institute of Science and Technology (KAIST), and director of The Center for Viral Immunology at the Institute for Basic Science (IBS), a Korean government-funded research institute.

Shin's research focus lies in the field of medical immunology with a particular focus on T cell responses to viral infection and cancer and T cell-mediated immunopathogenesis.

Shin is a Fellow of the Korean Academy of Science and Technology. He is Deputy Editor of Immune Network.

== Education ==
Shin completed his Doctor of Medicine from Yonsei University College of Medicine in 1996. He then pursued a Master's degree in Microbiology and Immunology from the same university and completed it in 1998. He completed his PHD in Microbiology and Immunology from the Yonsei University College of Medicine in 2001.

== Career ==
Shin joined the Immunology Section, Liver Diseases Branch, at the National Institute of Diabetes and Digestive and Kidney Diseases, NIH as a research fellow in 2002 and served until 2007. In 2007, he joined the Graduate School of Medical Science and Engineering, KAIST, as an assistant professor and served there for a period of six years up until 2013. From 2013 to 2018, he was appointed associate professor at the Graduate School of Medical Science and Engineering, KAIST. As of 2018, he is a professor at the Graduate School of Medical Science and Engineering, KAIST and an adjunct professor at the Yonsei University College of Medicine.

Shin was a director at The Center for Epidemic Preparedness, KAIST, from 2020 to 2021. He has been a director at the Center for Viral Immunology, Korea Virus Research Institute, Institute for Basic Science.

== Research ==
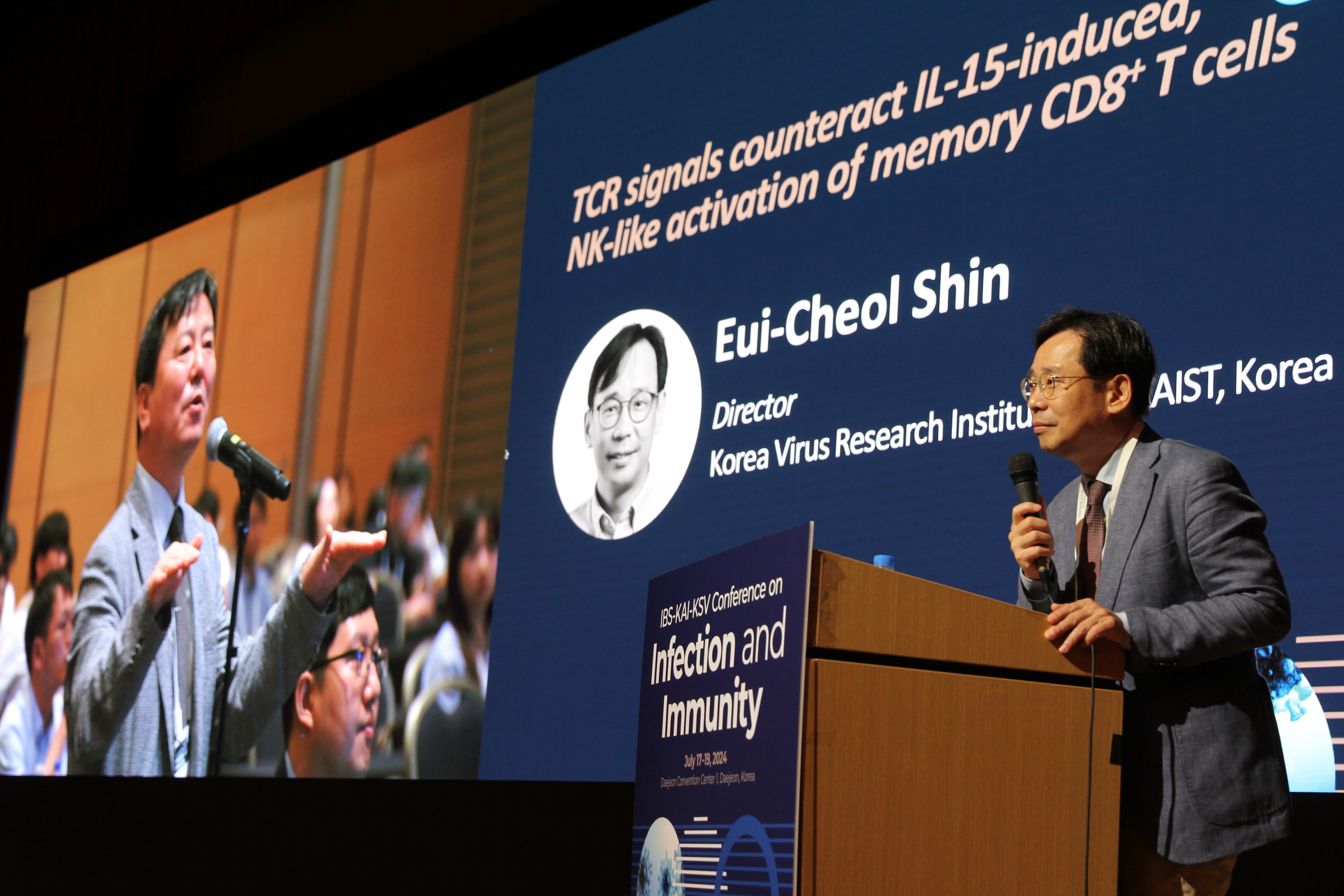
Eui-Cheol Shin (right) participating in a Q&A session with Young Ki Choi (left) at the IBS Conference on Virus and Immunology in 2024.

Shin has authored numerous publications, including articles in peer-reviewed journals. His research interests span the fields of medical immunology with a particular focus on T cell responses to viral infection and cancer and immunopathogenesis.

=== Bystander T cell activation ===
Shin discovered a pathological significance of bystander T cell activation in human viral disease by studying T cell responses in patients infected with hepatitis A virus (HAV). He found that pre-existing bystander memory CD8+ T cells are unexpectedly activated by cytokines (e.g., IL-15) regardless of their antigen specificity, causing liver cell damage through NKG2D-mediated cytotoxicity. This study demonstrated for that bystander T cells can be a cause of host injury in human viral infection. In subsequent studies, he characterized IL-15-responsive bystander T cells in the liver microenvironment. In addition, he revealed a mechanism of IL-15 production from epithelial cells and found CD5 as a major negative regulator of IL-15-induced T cell proliferation. His theory about bystander T cell activation has been highlighted as an important pathological mechanism in human viral disease.

=== Immune responses in COVID-19 ===
During the COVID-19 pandemic, Shin studied immune responses to COVID-19. First, he revealed a mechanism of hyper-inflammation in patients with severe COVID-19 by performing single-cell RNA-seq analysis. In his study, he reported a paradoxical role of type I IFNs in exacerbating inflammation in COVID-19 patients. He also performed a detailed characterization of SARS-CoV-2-specific CD8+ T cells, revealing that despite expressing PD-1, they are functionally active and not exhausted. These findings corrected the misinformation that had been previously reported during the early stages of the COVID-19 pandemic. This was one of the first studies that detected SARS-CoV-2-specific CD8+ T cells using MHC class I multimers. In addition, he demonstrated that SARS-CoV-2-specific T cell memory is sustained for a long period after recovery from COVID-19 with the successful development of stem cell-like memory T cells. Moreover, he showed that memory T cells elicited by COVID-19 mRNA vaccination substantially respond to the Omicron variant. On the basis of his findings, he proposed T cell-oriented strategies for controlling the COVID-19 pandemic.

== Awards and honors ==
- 2016: GSK Academic Award, The Korean Association for the Study of the Liver
- 2017: Hantan Award, The Korea Society of Virology
- 2018: KAI-Genexine Award, The Korean Association of Immunologists
- 2019: Yongwoon Grand Prize in Medicine, Yonsei University College of Medicine & Yongwoon Foundation
- 2022: Asan Award in Medicine, Asan Foundation
- 2023: Asian Scientist 100, Asian Scientist

== Bibliography ==
=== Selected articles ===
- Kim, J., Chang, D. Y., Lee, H. W., Lee, H., Kim, J. H., Sung, P. S., ... & Shin, E. C. (2018). Innate-like cytotoxic function of bystander-activated CD8+ T cells is associated with liver injury in acute hepatitis A. Immunity, 48(1), 161–173.
- Lee, J. S., Park, S., Jeong, H. W., Ahn, J. Y., Choi, S. J., Lee, H., ... & Shin, E. C. (2020). Immunophenotyping of COVID-19 and influenza highlights the role of type I interferons in development of severe COVID-19. Science immunology, 5(49), eabd1554.
- Rha, M. S., Jeong, H. W., Ko, J. H., Choi, S. J., Seo, I. H., Lee, J. S., ... & Shin, E. C. (2021). PD-1-expressing SARS-CoV-2-specific CD8+ T cells are not exhausted, but functional in patients with COVID-19. Immunity, 54(1), 44–52.
- Noh, J. Y., Jeong, H. W., Kim, J. H., & Shin, E. C. (2021). T cell-oriented strategies for controlling the COVID-19 pandemic. Nature Reviews Immunology, 21(11), 687–688.
- Koh, J. Y., Rha, M. S., Choi, S. J., Lee, H. S., Han, J. W., Nam, H., ... & Shin, E. C. (2022). Identification of a distinct NK-like hepatic T-cell population activated by NKG2C in a TCR-independent manner. Journal of hepatology, 77(4), 1059–1070.
- Jung, M. K., Jeong, S. D., Noh, J. Y., Kim, D. U., Jung, S., Song, J. Y., ... & Shin, E. C. (2022). BNT162b2-induced memory T cells respond to the Omicron variant with preserved polyfunctionality. Nature Microbiology, 7(6), 909–917.
