= Young-Kyoon Kim (urologist) =

South Korean urologist (1926–2021)

- 김영균
- Born: April 2, 1926; Keijō, Korea, Empire of Japan
- Died: March 19, 2021 (aged 94)
- Education: Seoul National University College of Medicine
- Known for: Research on bladder cancer and prostate disease
- Awards: Ho-Am Prize in Medicine (1991)
- Scientific career
- Fields: Urology
- Workplaces: Seoul National University; Dankook University

Young-Kyoon Kim (Korean: 김영균; 金英均; 2 April 1926 – 19 March 2021) was a South Korean urologist, medical researcher, and academic. He was a professor at Seoul National University College of Medicine, where he served as dean from 1984 to 1986, and later served as director of the medical center at Dankook University.

Kim's research included prostate disease and cancers of the urinary system. In 1991, he became the first recipient of the Ho-Am Prize in Medicine, receiving the award for clinical and experimental research on the development, progression, and prevention of bladder cancer.

== Early life and education ==
Kim was born in Seoul (then called "Keijō"), Korea, Empire of Japan on 2 April 1926, the youngest of three sons and two daughters of Kim Gyo-hui and Oh Geum-sun. He attended Kyunggi High School and studied during the transition from Keijō Imperial University to the post-liberation Korean university system. He graduated from Seoul National University College of Medicine in 1949.

== Medical career ==
=== Training in the United States ===
In 1953, shortly after the end of the Korean War, Kim traveled to the United States for postgraduate medical training. Health Chosun later described him as the first Korean urologist to undertake medical training in the United States.

Kim later recalled that he obtained the opportunity by writing unsolicited letters to hospitals in the United States asking for a position where he could study. Philadelphia General Hospital accepted him. Unable to afford airfare, he traveled to the United States aboard the cargo-passenger ship Sea Serpent, a voyage that took 17 days. He left behind his wife and their approximately 100-day-old child.

At Philadelphia General Hospital, Kim encountered contemporary American methods of diagnosing and treating prostate disease. After approximately a year and a half, he moved to Johns Hopkins Hospital, where he studied under urologist William Wallace Scott. Scott had trained under Charles Brenton Huggins, whose work on the hormonal treatment of prostate cancer later received the 1966 Nobel Prize in Physiology or Medicine. Kim studied benign prostatic enlargement, prostate cancer, and hormonal approaches to treating prostate cancer.

Scott offered Kim the opportunity to remain at Johns Hopkins for residency training. Kim declined and returned to South Korea in January 1956, saying that he had promised his wife that he would return after three years abroad.

=== Career in South Korea ===
After returning to South Korea, Kim initially had difficulty finding a position. He later recalled that Korean medical institutions at the time were not always receptive to physicians returning from training in the United States. He joined Gyeongjeon Hospital, operated by the former Gyeongseong Electric Company and a predecessor of what became KEPCO Medical Center, and began focusing his research on prostate disease.

Kim also maintained exchanges with Japanese urologists as he developed prostate research in South Korea. His overseas training helped introduce contemporary methods for the diagnosis and treatment of prostate disease at a time when the field was still poorly developed in the country.

Kim became a professor at Seoul National University in 1965. He subsequently held senior academic and administrative positions at the university and at Seoul National University Hospital. From April 1984 to April 1986, he served as the 17th dean of Seoul National University College of Medicine.

After retiring from Seoul National University in 1991, Kim served as director of Dankook University Medical Center. He also served as president of the Korean Urological Association and the Korea–Japan Urological Association.

== Research ==
Kim conducted clinical and experimental research on malignancies of the urinary tract, particularly bladder cancer. His work investigated the mechanisms involved in the development and progression of bladder cancer and approaches to preventing recurrence.

Research cited in connection with his Ho-Am Prize included experiments involving vitamin A and BCG in bladder cancer. Contemporary reporting stated that Kim's studies found that continued low-dose vitamin A administration reduced tumor development in experimental models and that combined treatment with vitamin A and BCG produced a stronger antitumor effect. The work was cited as providing a basis for further approaches to bladder-cancer treatment and recurrence prevention.

== Ho-Am Prize ==
In 1991, Kim was named the inaugural recipient of the Ho-Am Prize in Medicine. At the time he was a professor at Seoul National University. The inaugural Ho-Am Prize ceremony was held on 22 March 1991 at the Hotel Shilla in Seoul.

Kim received 50 million won with the prize and donated the award money to the development fund of Seoul National University College of Medicine.

== Korea Prostate Management Association ==
After retiring from his university career, Kim became involved in public education and screening for prostate disease. He founded the Korea Prostate Management Association in 1995 and served as its first president.

The association was established to increase awareness of prostate disease and promote screening and prevention. It later developed medical outreach and prostate-screening programs, including services for older men in rural and medically underserved areas.

== Writing ==
Kim wrote and co-wrote works on urology, bladder cancer, prostate disease, and general medicine. His publications included textbooks and books on bladder cancer and prostate health.

In 2014, he published the essay collection 건강 100세를 위한 김영균 의학산문 (approximately, Kim Young-Kyoon's Medical Essays for a Healthy 100 Years), which discussed health, aging, medicine, and episodes from his life and career.

== Death ==
Kim died on 19 March 2021 at the age of 94. Korean press coverage of his death noted his contributions to the development of urology in South Korea, including his research, teaching, and public prostate-health programs.
