= Kyeongbuk Science High School =

High school in Pohang, South Korea

Coordinates: 36.0467598°N 129.3528110°E

- 경북과학고등학교
- Pohang, North Gyeongsang Province; South Korea

Information
- Type: Public
- Motto: 성실, 창조, 강건 (Honesty, creativity, strength)
- Established: 1993
- Enrollment: 142 (2024)
- Campus: 130 Jigok-ro, Nam-gu, Pohang, North Gyeongsang Province
- Website: school.gyo6.net/kbs

- Kyeongbuk Science High School
- Hangul: 경북과학고등학교
- Hanja: 慶北科學高等學校
- RR: Gyeongbuk gwahak godeunghakgyo
- MR: Kyŏngbuk kwahak kodŭnghakkyo

Kyeongbuk Science High School (Korean: 경북과학고등학교) is a science high school located in North Gyeongsang Province, South Korea. The school opened in 1993. As of 2024, it has 142 students. The school tree is the zelkova serrata and the flower is the zinnia elegans.

== History ==
- June 27, 1992 – Established with an initial class of 30 students
- July 1, 1992 – Designated as a special purpose high school
- February 26, 1993 – Completion of the school building and dormitory
- March 1, 1993 – Inauguration of the first principal, Kwon Tak
- May 19, 1993 – Opening Ceremony
- November 16, 1994 – Completion of the third floor extension to the dormitory
- February 14, 1995 – 1st early admission graduation ceremony (19 students)
- November 23, 1996 – Establishment of comprehensive multimedia room
- March 17, 2004 – Opening of Yongorum Observatory
- January 20, 2023 – 28th graduation ceremony. Total number of graduates: 1,208
- March 1, 2023 – Inauguration of 12th Principal, Hongsik Son
- March 2, 2023 – 2023 school year admissions (61 students)
- March 2025 – Expected opening of Gyeongbuk Provincial Office of Education Mathematics and Culture Center

== Alumni ==
- Keum Na-na, author and Miss Korea 2002
- Kim Ho Min, biologist
