= Oh Uhtaek =

South Korean physiologist (born 1955)

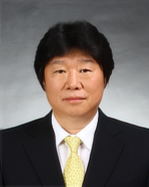
- Born: June 29, 1955 (age 71); South Korea
- Education: Seoul National University University of Oklahoma
- Scientific career
- Fields: Department of Physiology
- Workplaces: Professor, College of Pharmacy, Seoul National University
- Doctoral advisor: Robert D. Foreman

- Oh Uhtaek
- Hangul: 오우택
- Hanja: 吳禹澤
- RR: O Utaek
- MR: O Ut'aek

Oh Uhtaek or Oh Woo-Taek (Korean: 오우택; born June 29, 1955) is a South Korean physiologist. He is also a professor at College of Pharmacy, Seoul National University. His research is largely known for Cardiac Pain and other Visceral Pain Mechanism and as well as cloning.

== Education ==
1978 Seoul National University, College of Pharmacy, B. S.

1982 Seoul National University, College of Pharmacy, M. S.

1987 University of Oklahoma, School of Medicine, Department of Physiology, Ph.D.

== Work ==
- 1987 - 1988: Postdoctoral Training, Marine Biomedical Institute, University of Texas, Medical Branch at Galveston
- 1988: Assistant, Associate, Professor, College of Pharmacy, SNU
- 1994 - 1995: Visiting professor, Department of Physiology, Rosalind Franklin University HSC/Chicago Medical School
- 1997: Director, Sensory Research Center, Creative Research Initiatives, SNU
- 1998 – 2003: Associate editor, Neuroscience Letters, Elsevier
- 1999 – 2000: Editor-in-chief, Archives of Pharmacal Research
- 2000 – 2000: Secretary general, Korean Society for Brain and Neural Science
- 2004 – 2004: Secretary general, Korean Society for Biochemistry and Molecular Biology
- 2004 – 2004: Secretary general, Federation of Asian Pain Societies
- 2004: Member of the Korean Academy of Science and Technology
- 2005 – 2007: Secretary general, Organizing Committee, 19th FAOBMB Seoul Conference
- 2007 - 2013: Treasurer, FAOBMB
- 2008 – 2013: Chairman, WCU Dept of Molecular Medicine & Biopharmaceutical Sciences
- 2011 - 2013: National R&D Review Board of the MEST, Board Member
- 2011 - 2013: Biomedical Technology Development Steering Committee of MEST, Chair
- 2013: Chairman of the board, Institut Pasteur-Korea

== Major Research Activities ==
- 2012: Cho H et al., The Calcium-activated Chloride Channel Anoctamin 1 acts as a Heat Sensor in Nociceptive Neurons. Nature Neuroscience (2012)
- 2008: Yang YD et al., TMEM16A Confers Receptor Activated Calcium-dependent Chloride Conductance. Nature (2008)
- 2002: Shin J et al., Bradykinin-12-lipoxygenase-VR1 signaling pathway for inflammatory hyperalgesia. Proc Natl Acad Sci USA (2002)
- 2002: Cho H et al., Mechano-sensitive Ion Channels in Cultured Sensory Neurons of Neonatal Rats. J Neurosci (2002)
- 2000: Hwang SW et al., Direct activation of capsaicin receptors by products of lipoxygenases: Endogenous capsaicin-like substances. Proc Natl Acad Sci USA
- 1996: Oh U et al., Capsaicin Activates a Non-selective Cation Channel in Cultured Neonatal Rat Dorsal-root Ganglion Neurons. J Neurosci

== Awards ==
- 2006: National Academy of Science Award (Korea)
- 2009: Korea Science Award (Presidential Award)
- 2009: Scientist of the Month, Ministry of Science and ICT and National Research Foundation of Korea
- 2010: Top Scientist and Technologist Award of Korea (Presidential Award, Korean Federation of Science and Technology Societies (ko))
- 2019: Ho-Am Prize in Medicine
- 2020: Asian Scientist 100, Asian Scientist
