= Ho-Am Prize in Medicine =

- Description: Award recognizing individuals of Korean heritage who have furthered the welfare of humanity through distinguished accomplishments in the field of medicine
- Country: South Korea
- Presented by: Ho-Am Foundation / Samsung

The Ho-Am Prize in Medicine was established in 1990 by Kun-Hee Lee, the Chairman of Samsung, to honour the late Chairman, Lee Byung-chul, the founder of the company. The Ho-Am Prize in Medicine is one of six prizes awarded annually, covering the five categories of Science, Engineering, Medicine, Arts, and Community Service, plus a Special Prize, which are named after the late Chairman's sobriquet (art-name or pen name), Ho-Am.

The Ho-Am Prize in Medicine is presented each year, together with the other prizes, to individuals of Korean heritage who have furthered the welfare of humanity through distinguished accomplishments in the field of Medicine.

== Prizewinners of Ho-Am Prize for Medicine ==
Source: Ho-Am Foundation

- 1991: Young-Kyoon Kim
- 1992: Ho Wang Lee
- 1993: Sa-Suk Hong
- 1994: Waun Ki Hong
- 1995: Chung-Yong Kim
- 1996: Young-Shik Kim
- 1997: D. Wonkyu Choi
- 1998: Byung Pal Yu
- 1999: Chil-Yong Kang
- 2000: Ji-Won Yoon
- 2001: Andrew Ho Kang
- 2002: Seong Jin Kim
- 2003: Sung Wan Kim
- 2004: Stuart K. Kim
- 2005: Kyu-Won Kim
- 2006: Yongwon Choi
- 2007: Charles Surh
- 2008: Charles Lee
- 2009: V. Narry Kim
- 2010: William C. Hahn
- 2011: Augustine M.K. Choi
- 2012: Jae U. Jung
- 2013: Se-Jin Lee
- 2014: Seung K. Kim
- 2015: Sunghoon Kim
- 2016: Larry Kwak
- 2017: Paik Soon-myung
- 2018: Koh Gou Young
- 2019: Oh Uhtaek
- 2020: Park Seung-jung
- 2021: Lee Daeyeol
- 2022: J. Keith Joung
- 2023: Marcia Haigis
- 2024: Peter Park
- 2025: Gloria Choi
- 2026: Eva R. Hoffmann

== See also ==
- Ho-Am Prize in Science
- Ho-Am Prize in the Arts
- Ho-Am Prize in Engineering
- Ho-Am Prize in Community Service
- Asan Award in Medicine
- List of medicine awards
