= Gloria Choi =

South Korean neuroscientist and neuroimmunologist

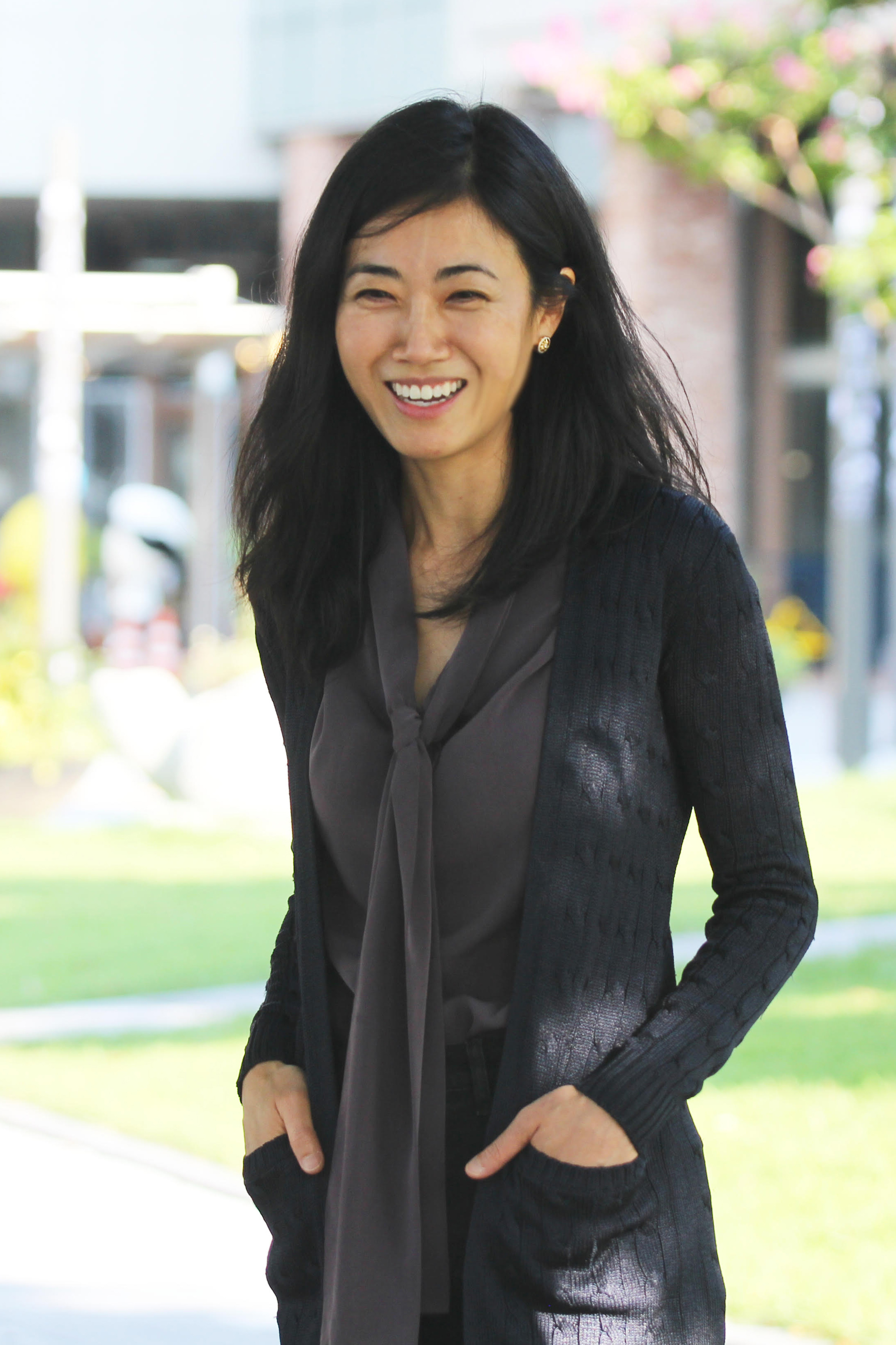
- Born: South Korea
- Education: B.A. University of California, Berkeley, Ph.D. Caltech, Postdoctoral work Columbia University
- Known for: Maternal immune activation drives Th17 cells to release IL-17a causing cortical defects in offspring and ASD-like behavioral phenotypes
- Awards: 2025 Ho-Am Prize in Medicine, 2019 Simons Foundation Autism Research Initiative Awardee, 2018 Peter Gruss Young Investigator Award Winner, 2017 Simons Foundation Autism Research Initiative Pilot Awardee, 2014 Cell's 40th Anniversary 40 under 40, 2014 Sloan Research Fellowship
- Scientific career
- Fields: Neuroscience, neuroimmunology
- Workplaces: Picower Institute for Learning and Memory at Massachusetts Institute of Technology

Korean name
- Hangul: 최보윤
- RR: Choe Boyun
- MR: Ch'oe Poyun

Gloria Bohyun Choi is an American neuroscientist and neuroimmunologist and the Samuel A. Goldblith Career Development Professor in the Picower Institute for Learning and Memory at the Massachusetts Institute of Technology. Choi is known for elucidating the role of the immune system in the development of autism spectrum disorder-like phenotypes. Her lab currently explores how sensory experiences drive internal states and behavioural outcomes through probing the olfactory system as well as the neuroimmune system.

== Early life and education ==
Choi was born in South Korea and immigrated to America in her teenage years. Her family settled in Southern California, where Choi developed a liking and interest in math and science because these subjects were easier to grasp while she was adjusting to the language barrier. Choi especially took a liking to biology throughout high school and continued to pursue biological studies at the University of California, Berkeley.

Since Choi had an early interest in applications of her studies, she joined the lab of Richard Harland to conduct laboratory research in molecular and cellular biology. Though she was just an undergraduate researcher, Choi became second author on a paper published in 2001 showing that the neural plate specifies somite size in the developing frog. Interestingly, Choi recalls a moment in her undergraduate degree where she asked her mother what she thought about her switching her focus to accounting. The lack of response on the other end of the phone further motivated Choi to stick to her path in biology, so much so in fact that after she received her bachelor's degree from UCB, she pursued a PhD in Biological Sciences at Caltech.

=== Graduate work ===
For her graduate studies at Caltech, Choi joined the lab of David Anderson, who at the time was just switching his research focus from neural crest cells to neural circuits underlying innate behaviors. Early into her graduate career, Choi explored the fate specification and differentiation of cells of the central nervous system in development. Her first paper in which she was co-first author highlighted the finding that the transcription factor, Olig2, sequentially defines motor neuron and oligodendrocyte fate specification. However, Choi and her colleagues were curious about the differentiation and specification of astrocytes in the central nervous system. Accordingly, they probed the roles of Olig1 and Olig2 transcription factors in astroglial specification and found that just as Olig1/2 promote motor neuron specification and suppress interneuron specification in the neurogenic phase, Olig1/2 promote oligodendrocyte specification and suppress astroglial specification in the later phase. This work has changed the way scientists think about the "logic" or "decision tree" that governs the differentiation of multipotent neural stems cells into neurons, astrocytes, and oligodendrocytes as they showed that cell subtype is fate restricted prior to restricting the overall neuronal or glial fate.

Choi then led some of the first projects in Anderson's lab exploring the neural circuits underlying innate behaviours. All animals possess the innate ability to detect social stimuli of another animal and exhibit either defensive or reproductive behaviours in response. Choi sought to find the developmental substrate that enabled hardwiring of this type of sensory perception but divergent behavioural outcomes. She found two parallel circuits, both delineated from the Lhx transcription factor family, that project from the posterior medial amygdala to the ventromedial hypothalamus, yet they possessed opposite neurotransmitter types. Even though these projections both receive the same information regarding olfactory cues in the environment, one circuit is implicated in reproductive behaviours and the other is implicated in defensive behaviours. Her work suggests a potential neural mechanism enabling divergent behaviours from the same sensory stimulus that is genetically hardwired in development.

=== Postdoctoral work ===
After defending her PhD in 2005, Choi left the West Coast to join the lab of Nobel Laureate, Richard Axel for her postdoctoral training. Continuing to study olfaction, Choi explored how the piriform cortex encodes olfactory stimuli and drives behaviour. She discovered in 2011, that the piriform cortex does not spatially encode odors. To elucidate this finding, Choi stimulated random ensembles of piriform neurons, using optogenetics, and paired stimulation with an unconditioned stimulus, either shock or reward. She found that after learning, stimulating these same ensembles in the absence of the unconditioned stimulus elicited the corresponding behavioural response. These novel findings suggest that the piriform cortex is able to elicit robust behaviours in the absence of sensory cues.

== Career and Research ==
In 2013, Choi was recruited to the Massachusetts Institute of Technology where she began her titles as a McGovern Investigator and an assistant professor in the Department of Brain and Cognitive Sciences. At MIT, where she later moved to The Picower Institute, Choi's lab focuses on exploring how sensory stimuli drive distinct internal states as well as behavioural responses. With her extensive training in exploring the neural circuits involved in olfaction, Choi uses the olfactory system as a tool to explore the connections between sensory inputs and behavioural outcomes, how neuromodulators shape and modify circuits, and how these circuits maintain plasticity. Choi has also begun to explore how the neuroimmune system regulates social behaviours and how maternal immune activation impacts behaviour in mice.

=== Oxytocin and Social Behaviour ===
Oxytocin has been shown to play a critical role in many social behaviours and olfaction appears to be a very important driver of social behaviours. Due to this knowledge, Choi and her team explored the role of oxytocin in social behaviours driven by olfactory cues. The first publication from Choi's lab at MIT highlighted their discovery that oxytocin signalling is specifically required to learn associations between olfactory stimuli and social cues but not nonsocial cues. Further, they found that activating oxytocin positive neurons enabled social learning and that oxytocin mediated signalling in the piriform cortex is necessary to mediate social learning to both appetitive and aversive olfactory cues.

=== Maternal Immune Activation, Neuroimmune signalling, and Social Behaviour ===
Choi's interests soon shifted towards exploring a deeper understanding of why mothers with viral infections during pregnancy have offspring with an increased frequency of autism spectrum disorder (ASD). The experimental model for this clinical observation is known as Maternal Immune Activation (or MIA) which Choi used to examine which immune cell population is implicated in driving ASD-like behaviours. Choi and her team found that a specific type of T cell (RORyT-dependent effector T lymphocytes) along with the release of a specific signalling molecule, cytokine IL-17a, are required for MIA driven ASD-like behaviours in offspring. The IL-17a released by T cells in the mother leads to abnormal cortical phenotypes in the offspring suggesting that targeting these specific T cells in the mother might be a means to prevent the development of inflammation induced ASD-like behaviours in offspring.

Choi and her colleagues then explored the underlying mechanisms by which T cells are activated in the immunocompromised mother to promote release of IL-17a and development of ASD-like behaviours in offspring. They found that maternal intestinal bacteria promote T cell differentiation in T helper 17 cells which release IL-17a and mediate the development of cortical abnormalities. Shortly after, Choi and her team identified the main brain region affected in MIA driven models of ASD-like behaviour. They found that the dysgranular zone of the primary somatosensory cortex was the site of abnormalities and that inhibiting this region reduced ASD-like behavioural abnormalities in offspring of mothers with MIA.

Choi and her colleagues recently established the role of IL-17 in mitigating the aberrant social behaviour in both MIA and monogenic models for ASD-like behaviour. The administration of LPS, which induces IL-17a, rescued the behavioural phenotypes in MIA models while direct administration of IL-17a into the primary somatosensory cortex was required to reduce behavioural abnormalities in monogenic ASD models. Their findings highlight a neuroimmune mechanism underlying developmental disorders and that administration of IL-17a during inflammation might provide a possible therapy to reduce neuronal activity on the primary somatosensory cortex and prevent social behaviour deficits.

== Awards ==
- 2025 Ho-Am Prize in Medicine
- 2021 Carol and Gene Ludwig Award for Early Career Research
- 2021 Mark Hyman, Jr. Career Development Professorship
- 2019 Nancy Lurie Marks Family Foundation (NLMFF) Career Development Award
- 2019 Simons Foundation Autism Research Initiative Awardee
- 2018 Peter Gruss Young Investigator Award Winner
- 2017 Simons Foundation Autism Research Initiative Pilot Awardee
- 2014 Cell's 40th Anniversary 40 under 40
- 2014 Sloan Research Fellowship

== Publications ==
- IL-17a promotes sociability in mouse models of neurodevelopmental disorder. Michael Douglas Reed, Yeong Shin Yim, Ralf D. Wimmer, Hyunju Kim, Changhyeon Ryu, Gwyneth Margaret Welch, Matias Andina, Hunter Oren King, Ari Waisman, Michael M. Halassa, Jun R. Huh* & Gloria B. Choi*. Nature 2019 December 18; doi:10.1038/s41586-019-1843-6
- Odor Perception on the Two Sides of the Brain: Consistency Despite Randomness. Evan S. Schaffer, Dan D. Stettler, Daniel Kato, Gloria B. Choi, Richard Axel, L.F. Abbott. Neuron 2018 May 16; doi.10.1016/j.neuron.2018.04.004
- I Can't Watch: A Genetic and Circuit-Level Investigation of Observational Fear Learning. Michael Douglas Reed, Gloria B. Choi. Neuron 2018 May 2; doi:10.1016/j.neuron.2018.04.023
- Reversing behavioural abnormalities in mice exposed to maternal inflammation. Yeong Shin Yim, Ashley Park, Janet Berrios, Mathieu Lafourcade, Leila M. Pascual, Natalie Soares, Joo Yeon Kim, Sangdoo Kim, Hyunju Kim, Ari Waisman, Dan R. Littman, Ian R. Wickersham, Mark T. Harnett, Jun R. Huh* & Gloria B. Choi*. Nature 2017 September 13; doi:10.1038/nature23909
- Maternal gut bacteria promote neurodevelopmental abnormalities in mouse offspring. Sangdoo Kim, Hyunju Kim, Yeong Shin Yim, Soyoung Ha, Koji Atarashi, Tze Guan Tan, Randy S. Longman, Kenya Honda, Dan R. Littman, Gloria B. Choi & Jun R. Huh. Nature 549, 528–532 (2017). https://doi.org/10.1038/nature23910
- Molecular signatures of neural connectivity in the olfactory cortex. Assunta Diodato, Marion Ruinart de Brimont, Yeong Shin Yim, Nicolas Derian, Sandrine Perrin, Juliette Pouch, David Klatzmann, Sonia Garel, Gloria B Choi & Alexander Fleischmann. Nature Communications. 2016 July 18; doi:10.1038/ncomms12238
- The maternal interleukin-17a pathway in mice promotes autism-like phenotypes in offspring. Gloria B. Choi, Yeong S. Yim, Helen Wong, Sangdoo Kim, Hyunju Kim, Sangwon V. Kim, Charles A. Hoeffer, Dan R. Littman, Jun R. Huh. Science. 2016 Jan 28; pp.doi:10.1126/science.aad0314
- Oxytocin mediates entrainment of sensory stimuli to social cues of opposing valence. Choe, H.K., Reed, M., Benavidez, N., Montgomery, D., Soares, N., Yim, Y.S., Choi, G.B. Neuron. 2015 Jul 1;87(1):152-63. doi:10.1016/j.neuron.2015.06.022
- Driving opposing behaviours with ensembles of piriform neurons. Choi, G.B., Stettler, D., Kallman, B., Shaskar, S., Fleishman, A., and Axel, R. Cell. 2011 Sep 16;146(6):1004-15. doi:10.1016/j.cell.2011.07.041
- A nose by any other name (should smell as sweetly). Choi, G.B. and Anderson D.J. Cell. 2005 Nov 18;123(4):550-3.
- Lhx6 delineates a pathway mediating innate reproductive behaviors from the amygdala to the hypothalamus. Choi, G.B., Dong, H.W., Murphy, A., Eichele, G., Yancopoulos, G.D., Valenzuela, D.M., Swanson, L., and Anderson D.J. Neuron. 2005 May 19;46(4):647-60.
- Olig genes and the genetic logic of CNS neural cell fate determination. Anderson, D.J., Choi, G., and Zhou, Q. Clinical Neuroscience Research 2: 17–28.
- The bHLH Transcription factor Olig2 promotes oligodendrocyte differentiation in collaboration with Nkx2.2. Zhou, Q. *, Choi, G.*, Zhou, Q., and Anderson, D.J.Neuron. 2001 Sep 13;31(5):791-807. *Authors contributed equally to the paper.
- The neural plate specifies somite size in the Xenopus laevis gastrula. Mariani, F.V., Choi, G.B., and Harland, R.M. Dev Cell. 2001 Jul;1(1):115-26.

== Personal life ==
Choi is married to Jun Huh, Professor of Immunology at Harvard Medical School.
