= Larry Kwak =

American cancer researcher

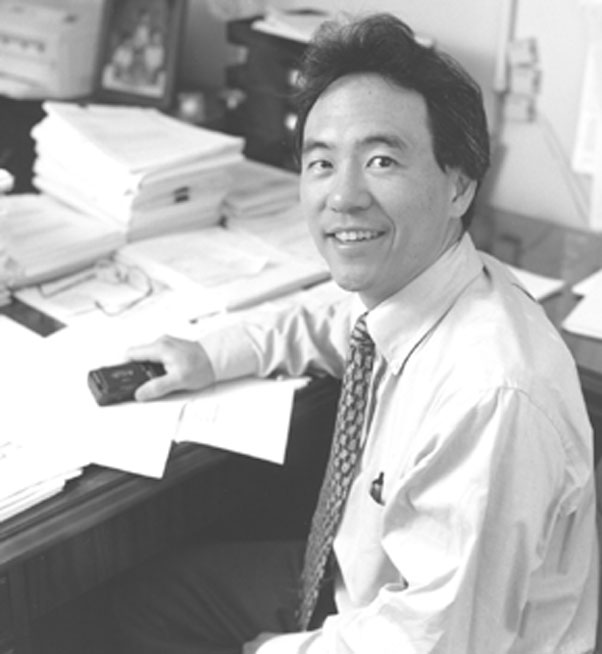

Larry Kwak is an American cancer researcher who previously worked at City of Hope in Duarte, California and the University of Texas MD Anderson Cancer Center. He was included on Time's list of 2010's most influential people.

== Early career ==
Dr. Kwak graduated from the 6-year combined B.S./M.D. Honors Program in Medical Education from Northwestern University Medical School in 1982 and earned his Ph.D. in tumor cell biology there in 1984. He then completed a residency in internal medicine and a fellowship in medical oncology at Stanford University Medical Center in California.

Thereafter, he served as Head of the Vaccine Biology Section, Experimental Transplantation and Immunology Branch, at the National Cancer Institute (NCI) from 1992 to 2004. His NCI laboratory is credited with the pioneering bench-to-clinic development of a therapeutic cancer vaccine for B-cell malignancies, which was recently reported as positive in a landmark national Phase III clinical trial. This was one of three recently positive Phase III clinical trials of cancer immunotherapy.

From 2004 to 2014, Dr. Kwak served as Chairman of the Department of Lymphoma and Myeloma and co-director of the Center for Cancer Immunology Research at M.D. Anderson Cancer Center.

== City of Hope ==
In 2010 Dr. Kwak was named to the TIME100, one of the world's 100 most influential people by TIME magazine, for his 20-year commitment to the science of cancer immunotherapy, and in 2016 he was awarded the Ho-Am Prize in Medicine.

Dr. Kwak was the Director of the Toni Stephenson Lymphoma Center and the Dr. Michael Friedman Professor for Translational Medicine at City of Hope until 2026.

== Honors and awards ==
- Physicians Research Training Fellowship, American Cancer Society, New York, 1984
- Young Investigator Award, American Society of Clinical Oncology, 1989
- Asian and Pacific Islander-American Organization Outstanding Scientific Achievement Award, National Institutes of Health (NIH), 2000
- Elected to American Society for Clinical Investigation (ASCI), 2003
- NCI Technology Transfer Award, Center for Cancer Research, 2003
- Team Science Award recipient, International Society for the Biological Therapy of Cancer, 2010
- TIME 100 (Named by TIME magazine as one of the 100 most influential persons in the world), 2010
- Chang-Yul Oh Memorial Award, Korean American Medical Association, 2011
- Faculty Achievement Award in Clinical Research, MD Anderson Cancer Center, 2012
- Proclamation declaring October 26 as Dr. Larry Kwak day, Mayor, City of Houston, Texas, 2013
- Elected to Association of American Physicians (AAP), 2016
- Ho-Am Prize in Medicine, Seoul, South Korea, 2016
