= Edward Giovannucci =

Epidemiologist

Edward L. Giovannucci is a professor of nutrition and epidemiology at the Harvard School of Public Health. He is also an associate professor of medicine at Harvard Medical School. He is the editor-in-chief of the peer-reviewed journal Cancer Causes & Control.

== Education ==
Giovannucci received his M.D. from the University of Pittsburgh School of Medicine in 1984, and his MPH and SCD from the Harvard School of Public Health in 1988 and 1992, respectively.

== Research ==
Giovannucci is known for his research into the health benefits of obtaining vitamin D through sunlight exposure. He has said that for every death caused by skin cancer resulting from sun exposure, 30 deaths might be prevented due to increased vitamin D intake, and that "It does seem that Vitamin D levels seem to be a real predictor of heart disease." Other studies authored by Giovannucci have linked tomato consumption to a decreased risk of prostate cancer.
