= Gangneung Asan Hospital =

Geography
- Location: 38 Bangdong-gil, Gangneung. 25440, South Korea
- Coordinates: 37.81811°N 128.85923°E

Organisation
- Type: Tertiary referral hospital

Services
- Beds: 802

History
- Opened: 1996

Links
- Website: www.gnah.co.kr
- Lists: Hospitals in South Korea

Gangneung Asan Hospital (Korean: 강릉아산병원) is a tertiary referral hospital in Gangneung, South Korea. It was established by Asan Foundation and its founder Chung Ju-yung. It is the 2nd largest member hospital (825 beds) of Asan Health Network which consists of 8 hospitals including Asan Medical Center in Seoul since it opened in 1996. Gangneung Asan Hospital is one of teaching hospitals for University of Ulsan College of Medicine.
