= Kim Jin-soo (biologist) =

South Korean biochemist (born 1964)

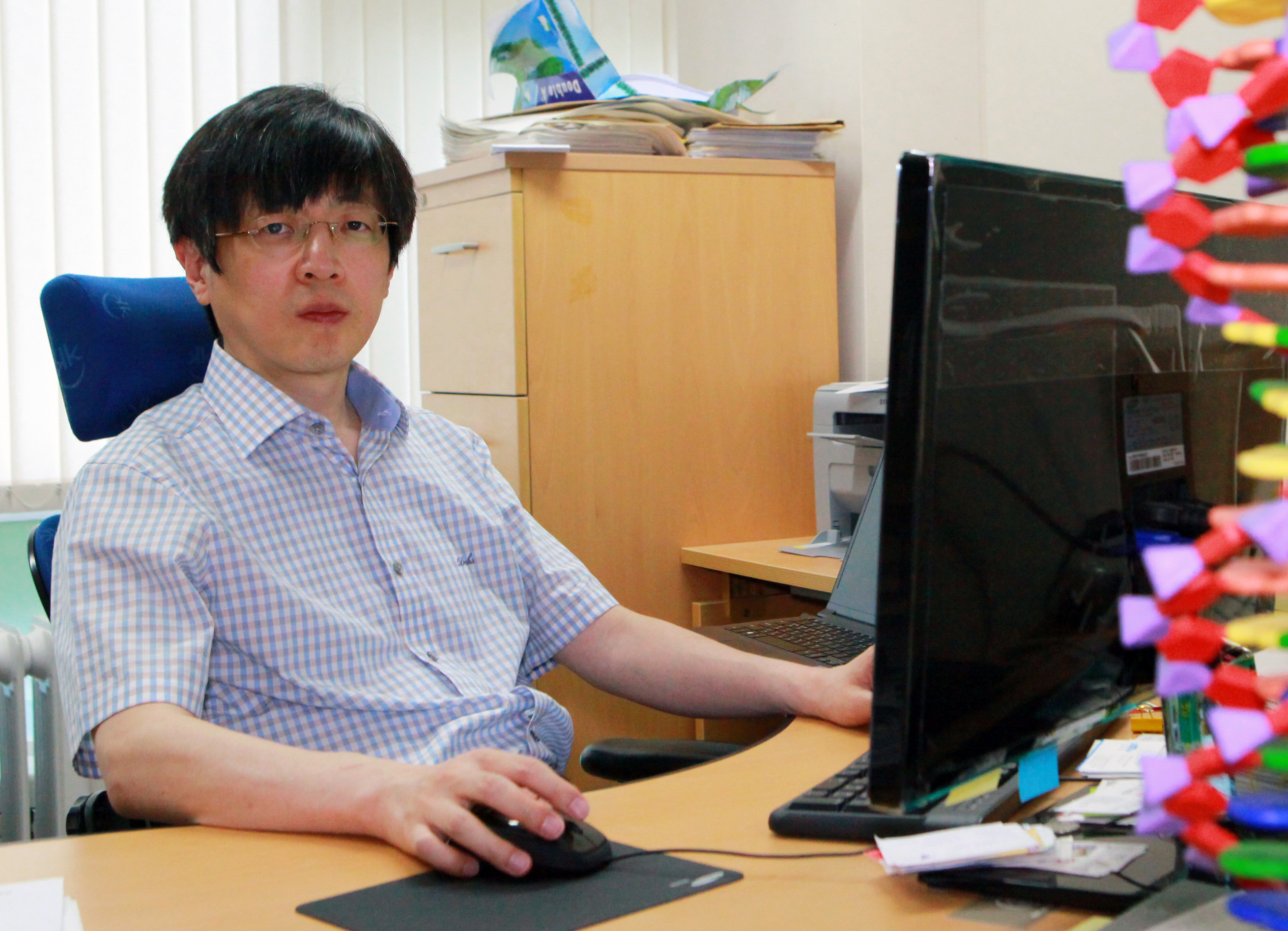
- Born: May 29, 1964
- Education: Seoul National University, University of Wisconsin-Madison
- Awards: Highly Cited Researcher (2018–2019), Asan Award in Medicine (2017)
- Scientific career
- Fields: ZFN, TALEN, CRISPR/Cas9
- Workplaces: Howard Hughes Medical Institute, Massachusetts Institute of Technology, Samsung Biomedical Research Institute, ToolGen, Seoul National University, Institute for Basic Science

Korean name
- Hangul: 김진수
- Hanja: 金晋秀
- RR: Gim Jinsu
- MR: Kim Chinsu
- Website: Center for Genome Engineering

Kim Jin-Soo (Korean: 김진수; born May 29, 1964) is a chemist, biologist, and entrepreneur. He was CEO and CSO, ToolGen, Inc., is a professor in the Department of Chemistry of Seoul National University and director of the Center for Genome Engineering. His research team has developed and improved several types of programmable nucleases, specifically zinc finger nucleases (ZFNs), TAL effector nucleases (TALENs), and RNA-guided engineered nucleases (RGENs). In 2018, he was a Clarivate Analytics Highly Cited Researcher in the cross-field category and in the biology and biochemistry category in 2019.

== Education ==
Kim studied chemistry at Seoul National University from 1983 and received a B.S. in 1987 and M.S. in 1989. He received a Ph.D. from University of Wisconsin-Madison in 1994.

== Career ==
He first worked as a research associate at the Howard Hughes Medical Institute and Massachusetts Institute of Technology for three years. In 1997, he became a principal investigator at the Samsung Biomedical Research Institute. In 1999, he left that position to be the CEO and CSO of ToolGen; a company he founded. ToolGen is a biotech company based on CRISPR technology focusing on human therapies, and molecular breeding in plants and animals. In 2005, the company was among the Top 10 Biotech Companies to Watch in Asia at the Pacific Rim Forum/China Council for the Promotion of Industrial Trade. In that same year, he left his CEO position and started working at Seoul National University as an assistant professor, then associate and then full professor. From 2014, he became the founding director of the Center for Genome Engineering under the Institute for Basic Science (IBS).

CRISPR-Cas9 is a widely used genetic tool but testing its accuracy genome wide is difficult. In 2015, Kim's IBS Center, Seoul National University, and ToolGen jointly published a paper in Nature Methods outlining their technique named Digenome-seq which locates on-target and off-target sequences in CRISPR-Cas9. Dignome-seq complements other genome wide off target analysis assays such as CIRCLE-seq and guide-seq, which are performed in vitro and in cellulo, respectively. He has continued to research increasing the accuracy of the process.

== Awards and honors ==
- 2019–2020: Highly Cited Researcher in biology and biochemistry category
- 2018: Highly Cited Researcher in cross-field category, Clarivate Analytics
- 2017: Asan Award in Medicine, Asan Foundation
- 2017: Hong Jin-Ki Creator Award
- 2015: Scientist of the Year Award
- 2014: Outstanding National R&D Performances in 2014, Ministry of Science and ICT
- 2004: Scientist of the Month, National Research Foundation of Korea and Ministry of Science and Technology
- 2003: 38th Invention Day Award, Korea Invention Promotion Association

== See also ==
- Feng Zhang
- J. Keith Joung
