= University of Ulsan College of Medicine =

Medical school of University of Ulsan in South Korea

Coordinates: 35.51997°N 129.42895°E

The University of Ulsan College of Medicine (UUCM) (Korean: 울산대학교 의과대학; RR: Ulsandaehakgyo Uigwadaehak) is the medical school of University of Ulsan, and is located in Songpa-gu, Seoul, South Korea. Founded in 1988, the school moved its campus to Seoul in 2004.

It is known as one of the Big 5 Medical schools in South Korea, affiliated with the nation's five largest, most prestigious hospitals in Seoul. They are renowned for high academic standards and include Seoul National University, Yonsei University (Severance), Sungkyunkwan University (Samsung), University of Ulsan (Asan), and Catholic University of Korea (Seoul St. Mary's).

The Asan Medical Center (AMC), the Ulsan University Hospital, and Gangneung Asan Hospital are its teaching hospitals.

The school has had 450 teachers and 358 undergraduate, 797 master, and 275 doctor graduates since it was founded.
