= Koh Gou Young =

South Korean vascularologist (born 1957)

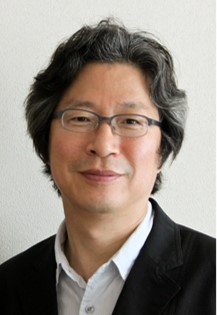
- Born: November 18, 1957; Jeonju, South Korea
- Citizenship: South Korea
- Education: Chonbuk National University (Ph.D. 1991)
- Known for: TIE2-activating antibody
- Awards: Ho-Am Prize in Medicine (2018), Asan Award in Medicine (2012)
- Scientific career
- Fields: Angiogenesis, lymphangiogenesis, adipogenesis, cardiogenesis
- Workplaces: Institute for Basic Science; KAIST

Korean name
- Hangul: 고규영
- RR: Go Gyuyeong
- MR: Ko Kyuyŏng

Koh Gou Young (Korean: 고규영; born November 18, 1957) is a researcher from South Korea studying organ vasculature and lymphatic vessels with an interest in angiogenesis, lymphangiogenesis, adipogenesis, and cardiogenesis. His research has contributed to the publication of more than 200 journal articles, including multiple publications on how Tie2 deficits are related to sepsis, blood-retinal barrier damage, and an imbalance of intraocular pressure in Schlemm's canal which induces glaucoma.

He is a distinguished professor at KAIST and the founding director of the Institute for Basic Science Center for Vascular Research.

== Education ==
Koh received an M.D. and PhD in 1983 and 1991, respectively, from Chonbuk National University Medical School in Jeonju.

== Career ==
Koh worked in the US for five years as a research fellow at Cornell University and then as a research associate at Indiana University. Upon returning to Korea in 1995, Koh started as an assistant professor and finished as an associate professor in Chonbuk National University Medical School before teaching at Pohang University of Science and Technology as an associate professor from 2001 until 2003. From 2003 to 2010 he was a professor in KAIST in the Department of Biological Science before becoming a distinguished professor in 2011 in the Graduate School of Medical Science and Engineering. He became the founding director of the IBS Center for Vascular Research in July 2015; their first in the field of basic medical sciences. He became a scientific member at the Max Planck Institute at Meunster in 2016 and a member of the National Academy of Sciences of the Republic of Korea in 2022.

He was on the editorial boards of Blood and Arteriosclerosis, Thrombosis, and Vascular Biology and is currently on the editorial board at Cancer Research.

== Honors and awards ==
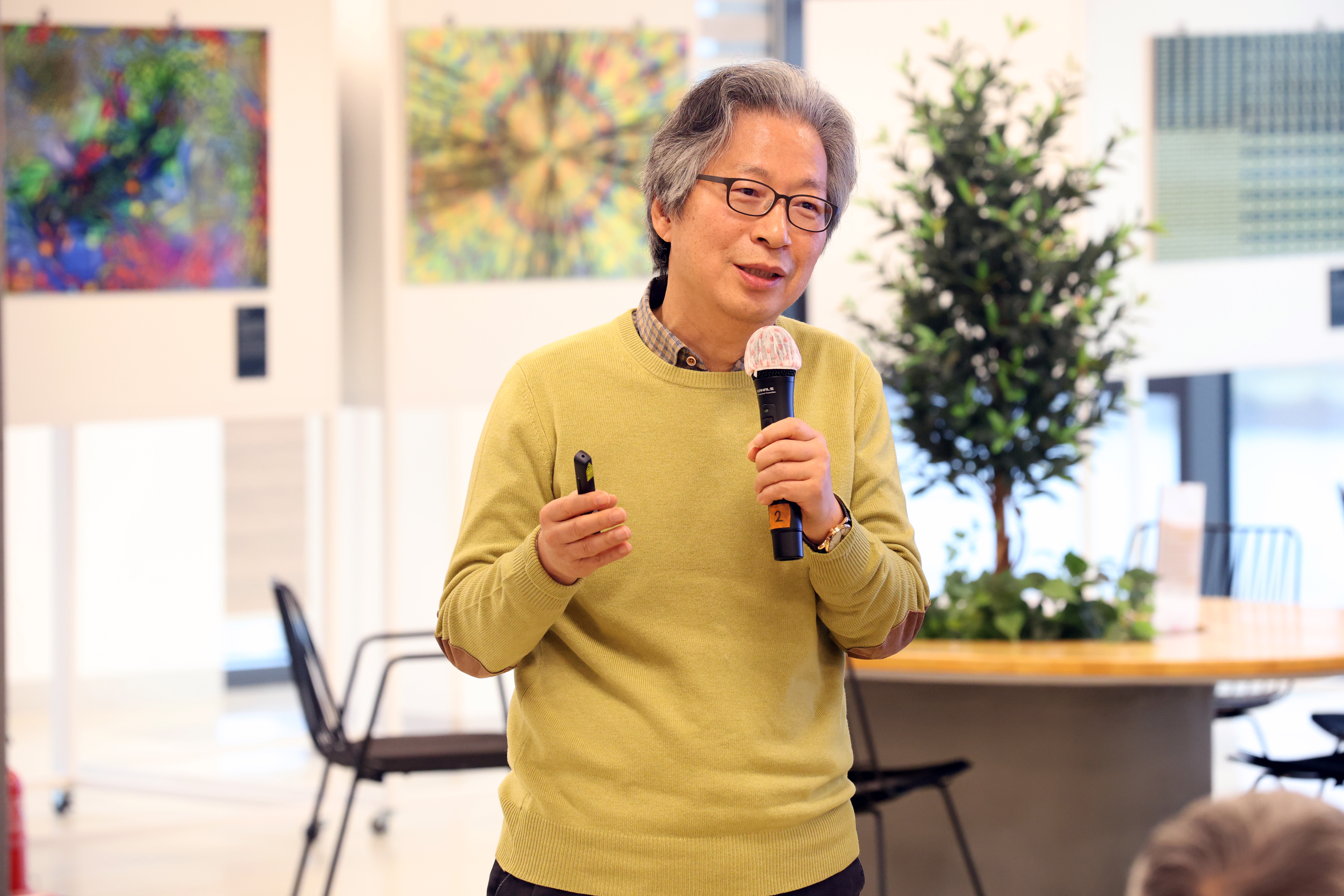
Koh Gou Young giving a talk to the public as a co-author of the book 첫 번째 기후과학 수업.

- 2024: Associate Member, European Molecular Biology Organization (EMBO)
- 2023: Top Scientist and Technologist Award of Korea, Korean Federation of Science and Technology Societies
- 2020: Korea's Top 5 Bio-Field Research Results and News
- 2020: Scientist of the Year Award
- 2018: Ho-Am Prize in Medicine
- 2016: Grant, Human Frontier Science Program
- 2012: Asan Award in Medicine
- 2011: Kyung-Ahm Prize
- 2011: Scientist of the Month
- 2010: KAISTian of the Year Award (KAIST)
- 2007: Wunsch Medical Award
- 2002: Pfizer Medical Research Award

== See also ==
- Platelet-derived growth factor receptor A
