= Asan Medical Center =

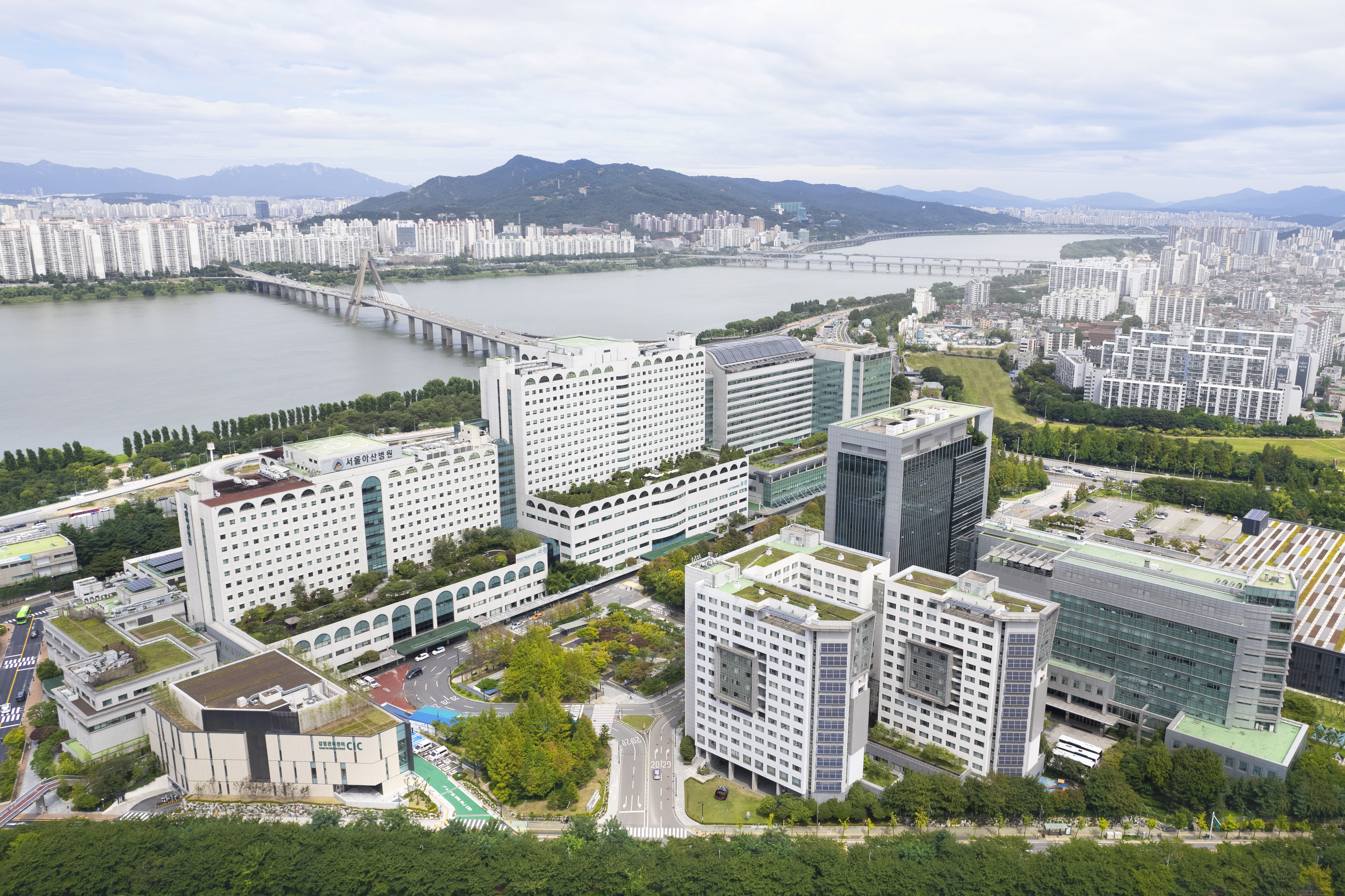
- Asan Medical Center

Geography
- Location: 88, Olympic-ro 43-gil, Songpa-gu, Seoul, South Korea

Organisation
- Type: Reference University Hospital
- Affiliated university: University of Ulsan

Services
- Beds: 2,432

History
- Founded: 1989

Links
- Website: eng.amc.seoul.kr
- Lists: Hospitals in South Korea

Asan Medical Center (AMC) (서울아산병원) is a reference hospital and the teaching hospital of the University of Ulsan College of Medicine, located in Seoul, South Korea. With 2,432 beds for patients and a total floor area of approximately 280,000 square meters (85,000 Pyeong), it is the largest hospital in South Korea.

Asan Medical Center is the parent hospital of the eight hospitals under the ASAN foundation.

== History ==
Asan Medical Center was first established on the principles of Asan Foundation founder Chung Ju-yung. The hospital was inaugurated on June 23, 1989, originally named Seoul Jungang (Central) Hospital, and later renamed Asan Medical Center on April 27, 2002.

== Services ==
AMC has 56 clinical departments and divisions and 50 specialized centers and departmental specialist clinics, encompassing a range of medical fields. These include the Diabetes Center, Organ Transplantation Center, endocrinology, urology, gastroenterology, oncology, and neurology. The AMC also contains a Heart Institute is dedicated to the treatment of cardiovascular diseases, a Cancer Institute which offers multidisciplinary cancer care, and The Children's Hospital catering to pediatric patients aged 0 to 18, providing specialized care.

The Korea Management Association Consulting (KMAC) has also recognized it as Korea's Most Admired Hospital for 17 consecutive years.

Since 1999, AMC has implemented its own internally developed computerized systems, including PACS (picture archiving and communication system) and OCS (order communication system). In 2012, the institution launched a mobile website to provide smartphone-based services, facilitating tasks such as appointment scheduling, appointment confirmation, and access to blood test results.

Since 1993, Asan Medical Center has operated the Performance Improvement Team to enhance healthcare quality.

In 2011, the hospital introduced the Asan Global Standard (AGS), a comprehensive evaluation guideline implemented year-round, which was designed based on the fundamental assessment principles of the Joint Commission International (JCI).

== Affiliates ==
=== Asan Foundation ===
In 1977, Chung Ju-yung, established the Asan Foundation, a charitable non-profit that, amongst other things, worked to improve medical facilities in rural & impoverished areas. During the late 1970s, medical facilities in rural areas of South Korea were lacking. The Asan Foundation began in 1978 by establishing the Jeongeup Hospital, followed by general hospitals in seven different regions across the country, including Boseong, Boryeong, Yeongdeok, Keumkang, Hongcheon, and Gangneung. The Asan Foundation later founded The Asan Medical Center in 1989.

=== University of Ulsan College of Medicine ===
Established in 1988, the University of Ulsan College of Medicine is the medical school of the University of Ulsan. Asan Medical Center, the Ulsan University Hospital, and Gangneung Asan Hospital are its teaching hospitals.

=== Asan Institute for Life Sciences ===
Asan Medical Center established the Asan Institute for Life Sciences in 1990, to enhance clinical care and foster advancements in medical science. The institute hosts researchers from institutions worldwide, including the Dana-Farber/Harvard Cancer Center, the University of Minnesota, the Korea Advanced Institute of Science and Technology, and Asan Medical Center.

=== Asan Health Network ===
The Asan Medical Center serves as the parent to the Asan Health Network's hospitals. These include:

- Jeongeup Asan Hospital (1978)
- Boseong Asan Hospital (1978)
- Boryeong Asan Hospital (1979)
- Yeongdeok Asan Hospital (1979)
- Asan Medical Center (1989)
- Keumkang Asan Hospital (1989)
- Hongcheon Asan Hospital (1989)
- Gangneung Asan Hospital (1996)

== Capacity ==
The AMC is the largest hospital in Korea. Its capacity includes:

- Total licensed beds: 2,432 licensed beds
- Outpatients: Daily average of 11,402
- Inpatients: Annual average of 624,447
- International Patients: Annual average of 19,482
- Emergency patients: Annual average of 105,491
- Surgical operations: Annual average of 47,460 surgeries

== Social contributions ==
AMC provides charitable medical services; every year, medical teams from AMC visit nations in Asia, including Cambodia, Laos, and Vietnam. The ‘Asan in Asia' project aims to elevate medical standards in Asia. One example of this project's activities is the agreement signed in 2018 between AMC and Huế Central Hospital in Vietnam that supports training for medical professionals.

== Awards and recognitions ==
- The Korea Management Association Consulting (KMAC) has recognized the Asan Medical Center as Korea's Most Admired Hospital for 17 consecutive years.
- In 2024, Newsweek's ranking of the world's best hospitals placed it in 22nd place.
