= Dongguk University =

Private university in Seoul, South Korea

- 동국대학교 (Korean)
- Former names: Myungjin School (1906–1910); Dongguk College (1946–1953)
- Motto: 지혜, 자비, 정진 (Hangul) 智慧, 慈悲, 精進 (Hanja); Jihye, Jabi, Jeongjin (RR)
- Motto in English: Wisdom, Compassion, Endeavor
- Type: Private
- Established: May 8, 1906; 120 years ago
- Religious affiliation: Mahayana Buddhism
- President: Yoon Jae-woong (윤재웅)
- Undergraduates: 13,701 (2017)
- Postgraduates: 1,801 (2017)
- Location: Seoul, South Korea; 37.558222°N 127.000139°E
- Campus: Urban
- Colors: Orange
- Nickname: Dongguk elephants
- Mascots: Elephant, Lotus blossom
- Website: dongguk.edu (in English)

Korean name
- Hangul: 동국대학교
- Hanja: 東國大學校
- RR: Dongguk daehakgyo
- MR: Tongguk taehakkyo
- IPA: [toŋɡuk̚ ˈtɛ(ː)ɦak̚k͈jo]

Dongguk University (Korean: 동국대학교) is a private university in Jung District, Seoul, South Korea. It is a Buddhist-affiliated university with a long history of Buddhist education, and is a member of the International Association of Buddhist Universities. Dongguk University is well known for its Department of Film & Digital Medias. It is home to the Dongguk University Chungmuro Visual Arts Center, a major facility for film and visual-media production and research and a historical birthplace of Korean cinema. The university hosts and participates in various film-related events and programs.

Established in 1906 as Myeongjin School (명진학교; 明進學校) by Buddhist pioneers of the Association of Buddhism Research (불교연구회; 佛敎硏究會), the university gained full university status with its current name in 1953. The university's symbol animal is an elephant, which stemmed from Queen Māyā of Sakya's precognitive dream of a white elephant about the birth of the Buddha, and the symbol flower is a lotus blossom which reflects the Buddhist truth.

Dongguk University Seoul campus is organised into 127 undergraduate and graduate schools, which enrolled 13,701 undergraduate students and 1,801 graduate students and granted 3,140 bachelor's, 470 master's and 172 doctorate degrees in 2017. Its comprehensive academic programme offers 53 undergraduate majors, together with 59 graduate programmes.

The university also operates campuses in Goyang, Gyeongju, and Los Angeles, United States. The university operates two affiliated hospitals and four Traditional Korean medicine hospitals.

== History ==
=== Origins of Dongguk University ===
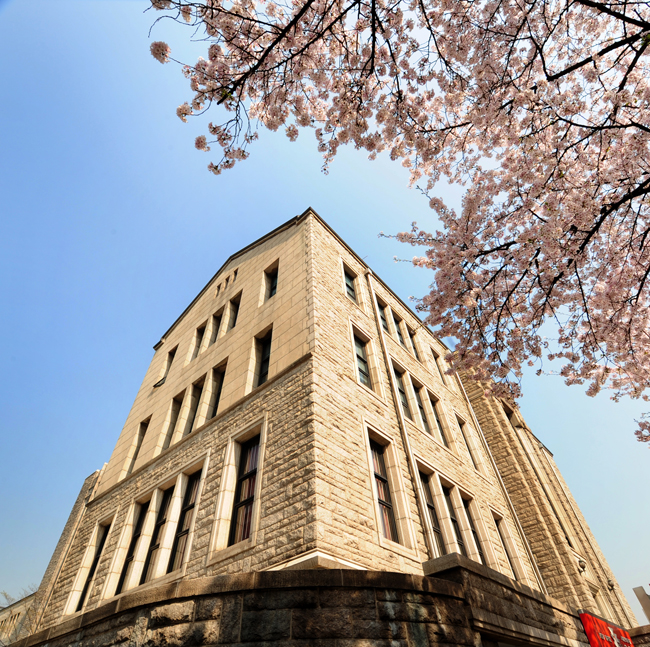
Myeongjin Hall, the oldest building in Dongguk University

The university began as Myeongjin School on May 8, 1906. It was established by the Association of Buddhism Research to provide Buddhist education.

In 1910, Myeongjin School was renamed Buddhist Normal School (불교사범학교; 佛敎師範學校), and later renamed Buddhist Higher Education Institution (불교고등강숙; 佛敎高等講塾) in 1914. It became the Central Education Institution (중앙학림; 中央學林) in 1915, but was closed by the Japanese Occupation Government from 1922 to 1928 for its connection to the Samil Undong uprising.

In 1928, the foundation of the Buddhist Specialised School (불교전수학교; 佛敎專修學校) was permitted after Buddhist temples all across colonial Korea donated 601,425 yen and established the Central Administrative Headquarters of the Joseon Buddhism Foundation (조선불교중앙교무원; 朝鮮佛敎中央敎務院) in 1924.

In 1930 it became the Central Buddhist Professional School (중앙불교전문학교; 中央佛敎專門學校) and in 1940 the school was renamed Hyehwa Professional School (혜화전문학교; 惠化專門學校).

On May 30, 1944, Hyehwa Professional School was again closed by Empire of Japan following the mobilization. After the World War II the school was reopened on October 27, 1945, and was expanded into Dongguk College (동국대학; 東國大學) on September 20, 1946.

=== Expansion ===
In 1951 after the Third Battle of Seoul, the college withdrew from Seoul, and provisional lectures were held in Jung District, Busan until the college got back to the original place September 1953 after the Korean War. Dongguk College was one of the first institutions in the South Korea to gain university status in the western sense, being designated the now Dongguk University in 1953. The postgraduate school opened simultaneously.

From 1950s to 1980s, the university underwent a major vitalisation. Construction of Myeongjin Hall which is the oldest building in the university now began in March 1956, and finished on December 30. In 1959, the Dongguk University Broadcasting system was initiated. The university took over Eunseok Elementary School in 1965, Heunguk Middle–High School in 1966, and Keumsan Middle–Commercial High school and Myeongseong Girls' Middle–High School in 1967. The College of Education was launched in 1968 with four courses, adding Physical Education major a year later. The Graduate School of Public Administration was founded in 1967, and In 1978 the Gyeongju Campus was established and opened in 1979. Also during the 1960s students of the university participated in the democratic uprisings of South Korea, which caused the deaths of students of the university. Students participated in the April Revolution against the autocratic government in 1960, and the June 3 Resistance in opposition to the negotiation for the Treaty on Basic Relations between Japan and the Republic of Korea in 1964.

In 1982, the university saw an academic overhaul which divided the College of Liberal Arts and Sciences into the College of the Arts and the College of Natural Science. In 1983, the university opened Gyeongju Oriental Medicine Hospital Attached to College of Korean Medicine, and opened Pohang Hospital and Dongguk University Medical Center in 1988. In 1989, the university opened Dongguk Oriental Medicine Hospital and opened Gyeongju Hospital Attached to College of Medicine in 1991. In 1997 the university made an agreement with Royal University of America, which was the educational institution located in Los Angeles. On March 5, 2009, Royal University of America was merged into Dongguk University, finally becoming Dongguk University Los Angeles.

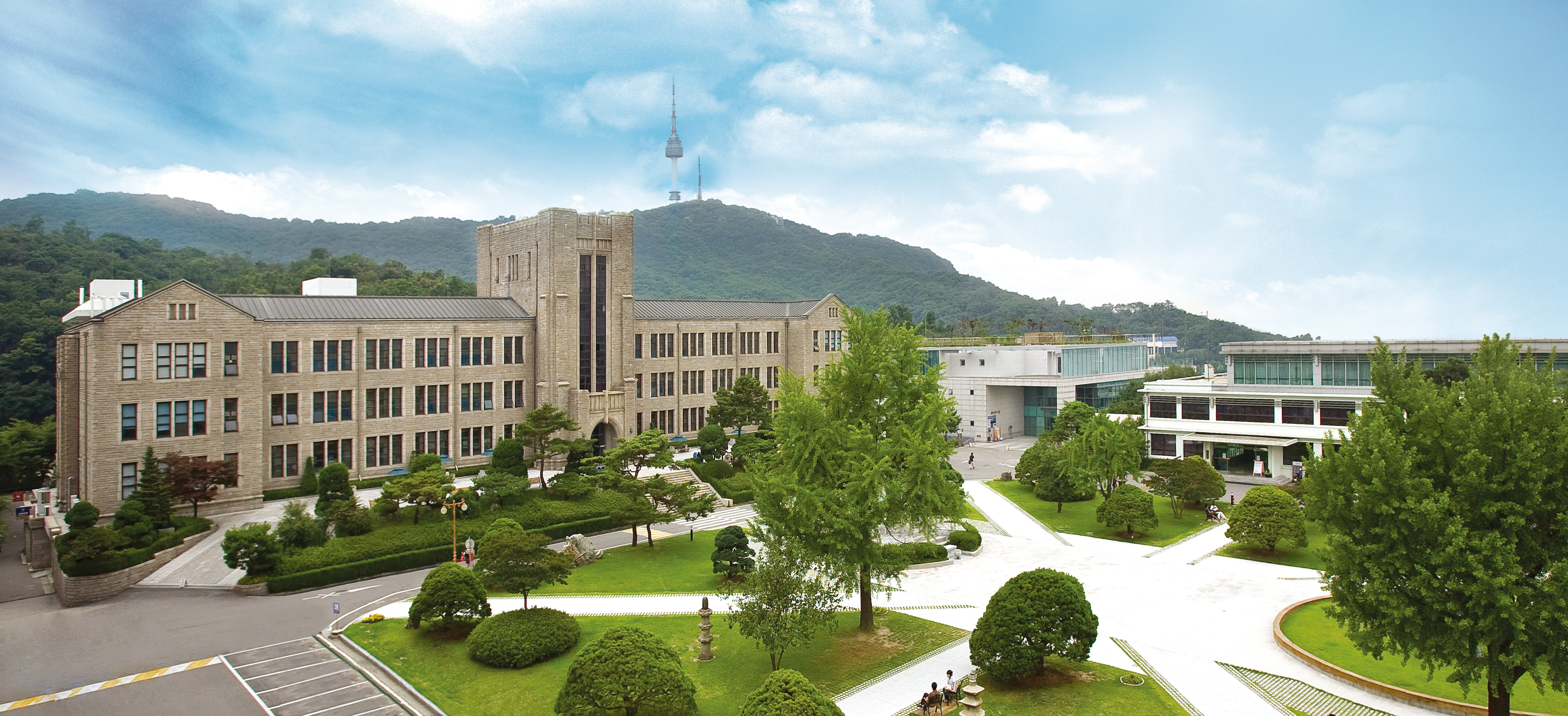
Grand View of Dongguk University

In September 2025, Dongguk University announced that it has been selected for the 2026 Campus Town Project promoted by the Seoul Metropolitan Government. Through this selection, Dongguk University plans to discover and foster youth start-up companies for four years from 2026 and promote a start-up support system centered on start-ups in school.

=== Modern era ===
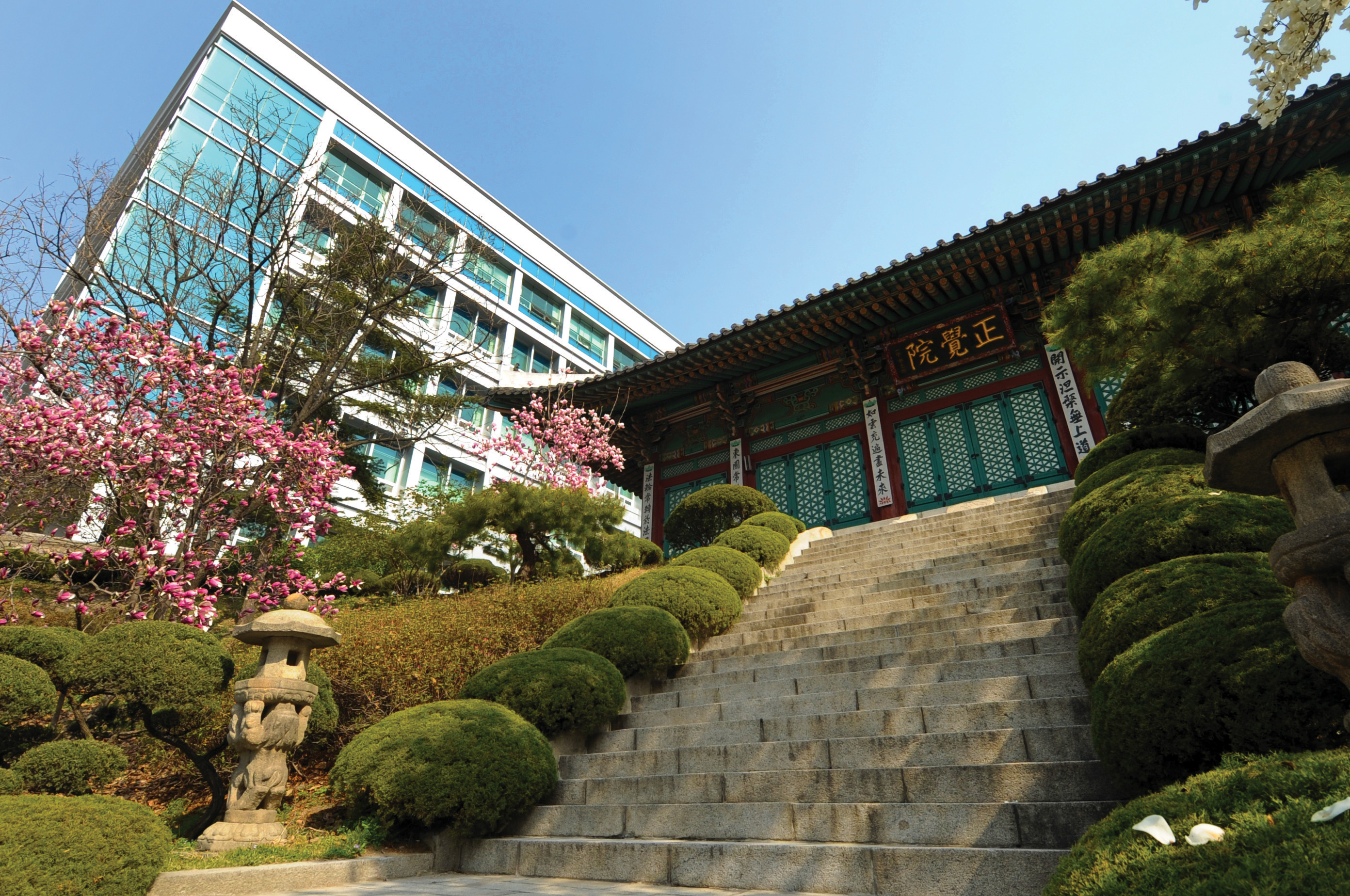
Jeonggakwon, Korean Buddhist temple in Dongguk University

In 2010, the university sought to take over Kyonggi University for the amount of around 150 billion won but provisional board of directors of Kyonggi University rejected the Dongguk University's bid. In 2012, Dongguk Business School was accredited by the AACSB. In 2014, King Willem-Alexander and Queen Máxima of the Netherlands visited the university during the state visit to South Korea and attended a seminar held by Jeonggakwon, Korean Buddhist temple in the university.

Dongguk University celebrated the 111st anniversary of the foundation in 2017, and announced new motto of 지혜, 자비, 정진 (智慧, 慈悲, 精進; Wisdom, Compassion, Endeavor) which replaced the previous motto, 섭심, 신실, 자애, 도세 (攝心, 信實, 慈愛, 度世; Steady one's clean mind, Behave truly and reliably, Love people with benevolence, Save mankind from agony).

== Campuses ==
=== Seoul campus ===
Dongguk University's main campus is located in Jung District, Seoul, just north of Namsan. The upper buildings of the campus are directly connected into the trails of Namsan park.

The campus' main entrance is at Dongguk University Station the intersection of Seoul Subway Line 3 and 4. Chungmuro Station is near the rear entrance.

- Dongguk University Station
- Chungmuro Station

The university is also served by the following Seoul metropolitan buses:

- 144, 301, 420, 407, 7212

The Seoul campus is known for prominent programs linked to the Chungmuro Research Center in national defense, AI and semiconductors, as well as noteworthy programs in the performing arts, social sciences, education, and international exchange. The Seoul campus is located just beneath Namsan Tower, in the centre of Seoul.

=== Ilsan, Goyang campus ===
Located near the Dongguk University Ilsan hospital, Dongguk's Ilsan campus focuses on advancing knowledge in medical technology, medicine and traditional Korean medicine.

=== Gyeongju campus ===
Opened in 1979, the campus is located in Gyeongju, North Gyeongsang Province. This campus focuses on Industrial Design and Public Police Administration, and has restructured its colleges to promote interdisciplinary integration, aiming to provide a more diversified education.

=== Los Angeles campus ===
Established in 1966, after the amalgamation of the university and Royal University of America, the campus concentrates in the traditional Korean medicine.

== Rankings and reputation ==
University rankings
JoongAng National	Domestic	8
QS National	General	20
ARWU National	Research	24–29
QS Asia (Asia version)	General	118
USNWR Asia	General	281
ARWU World	Research	801–900
QS World	General	=618
USNWR World	General	=900

Since becoming Dongguk University in 1946, the institution has produced many influential graduates across Korean society. Notably, its Police Administration department, established in 1962 originally as the Police College, has supplied numerous officers to key regional police roles, including police chiefs. In 1994, Dongguk pioneered North Korean Studies in Korea to foster inter-Korean dialogue and cultivate experts on inter-Korean relations. In 2012, the College of Business Administration earned its tenth international accreditation from the International Business College Development Council, a rare achievement in Korea at the time.

Dongguk University was ranked 8th in JoongAng Ilbo's Korean university rankings in 2026. Dongguk University was ranked 77th among Asian universities in 2015 QS World University Rankings, and 82nd in 2018. Dongguk University was also ranked 656th among the world and 211th among Asian universities in CWTS Leiden Ranking in 2017.

Dongguk Business School has obtained international recognition by acquiring Association to Advance Collegiate Schools of Business (AACSB) certification, and the business school offers a dual degree MBA program with University of Texas at Dallas.

The university has international MOUs with nearly 160 universities of 40 nations, including Duke University, UCLA, University of Manchester, University of Oslo and Victoria University of Wellington, and attracts nearly 1,800 international students every year for exchange or full-time study. The university offers hybrid programs with Swinburne University of Technology, University of Manitoba, University of Santo Tomas, Hindustan University and East China Normal University that combine language education and area studies. Dongguk University offers a dual degree program with Stony Brook University.

== Notable alumni ==
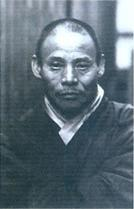
Han Yong-un, Korean Buddhist reformer

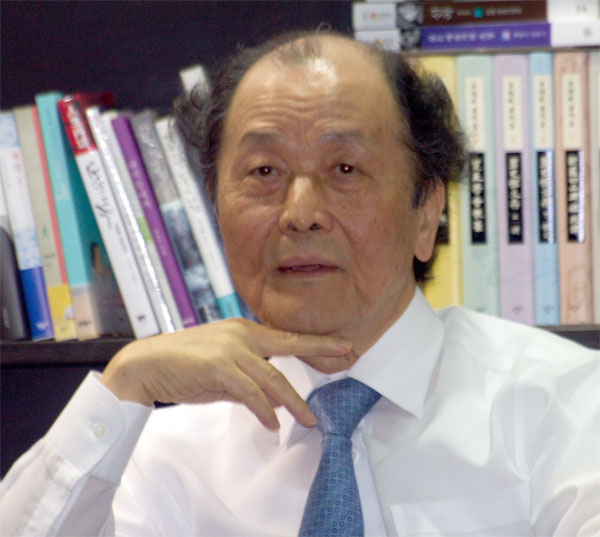
Jo Jeong-rae, Manhae Prize-winning novelist

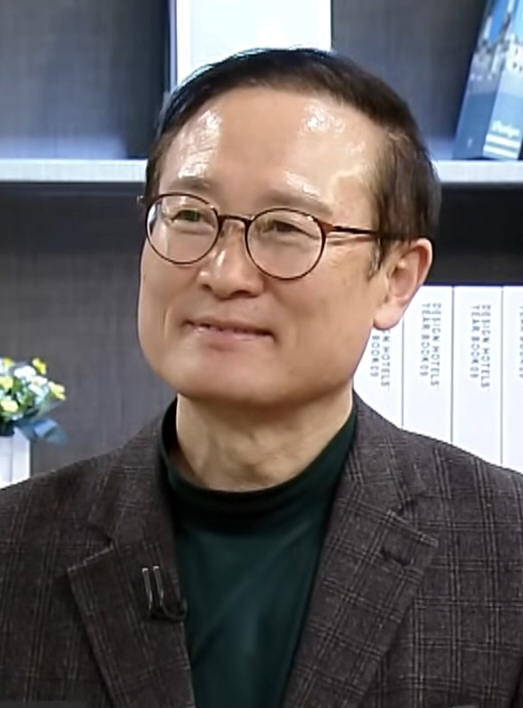
Hong Young-pyo, Floor Leader of Democratic Party

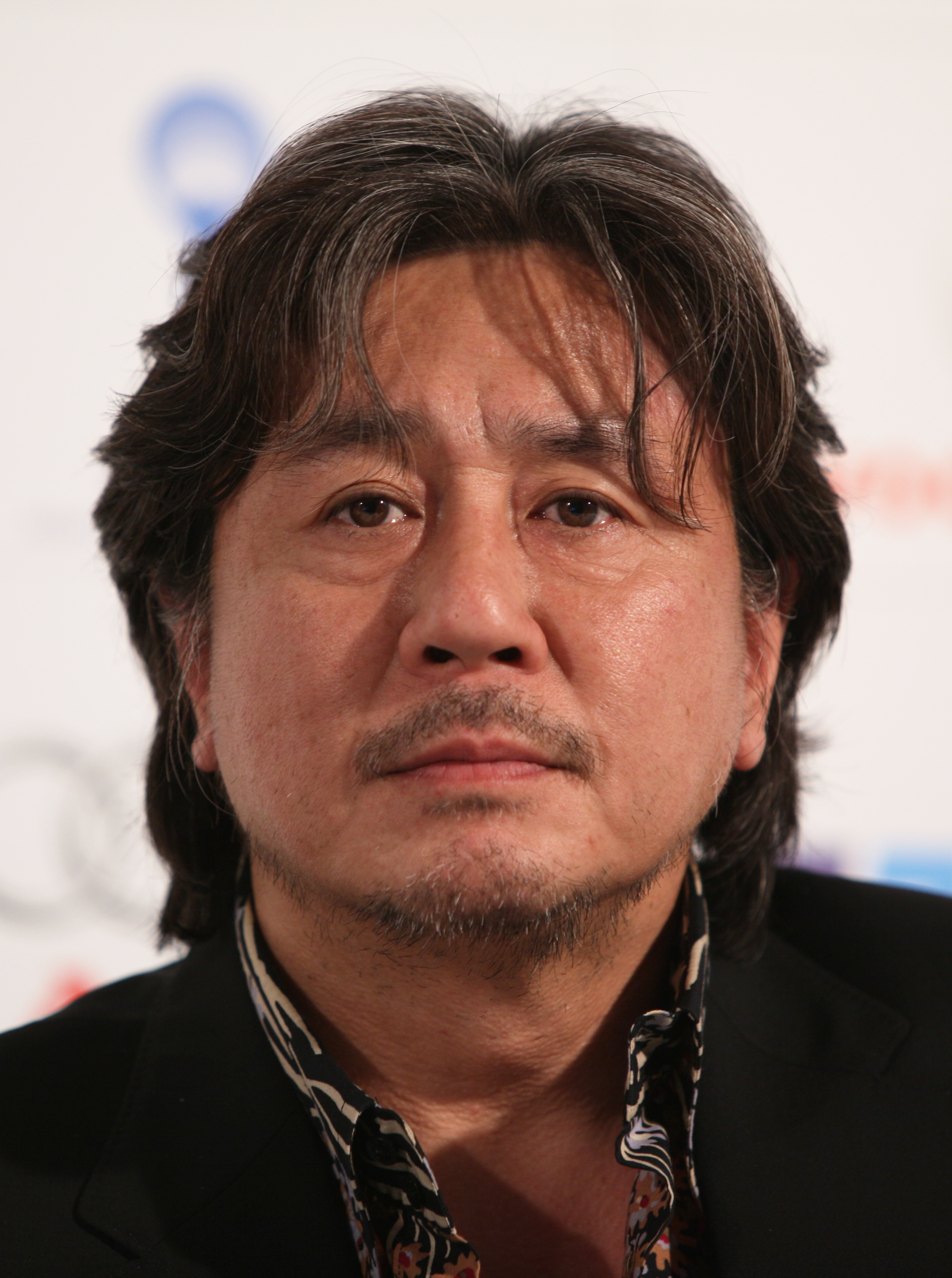
Choi Min-sik, Asia Pacific Screen Awards Best Actor winner

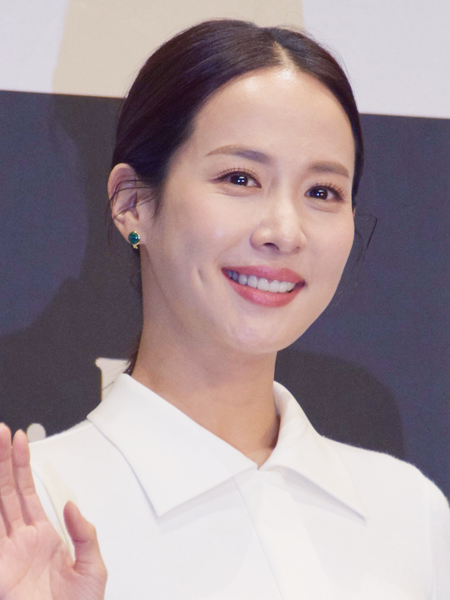
Cho Yeo-jeong, Blue Dragon Film Awards Best Actress winner

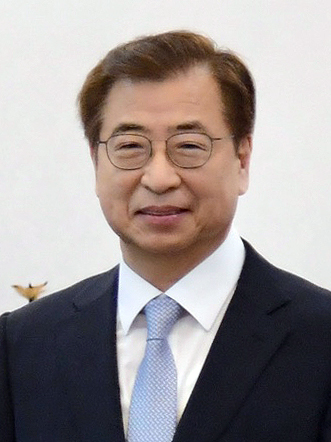
Suh Hoon, Director of the National Intelligence Service

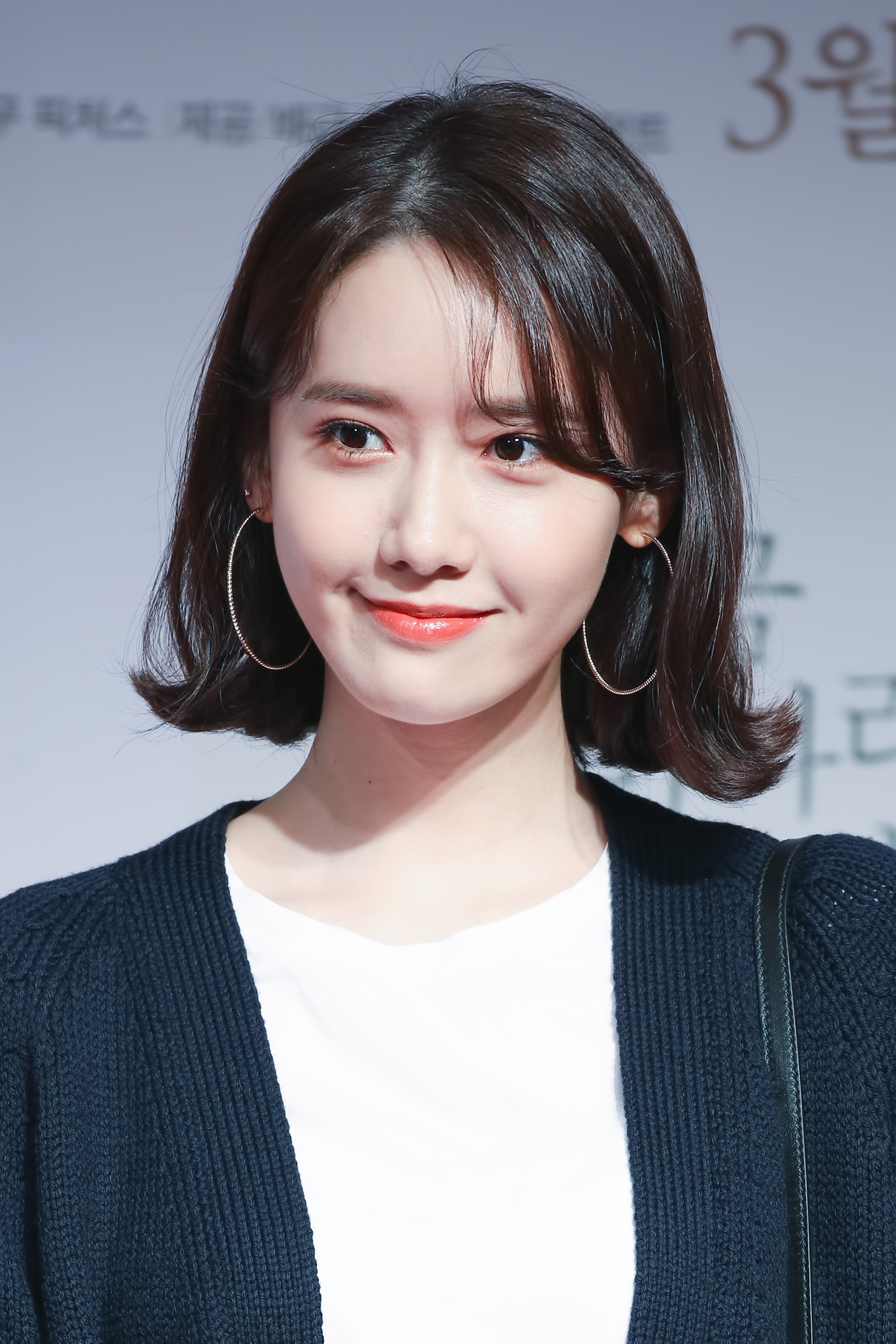
Im Yoon-ah, Girls' Generation member

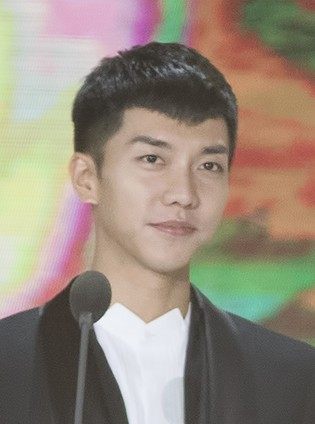
Lee Seung-gi, singer and multi-entertainer

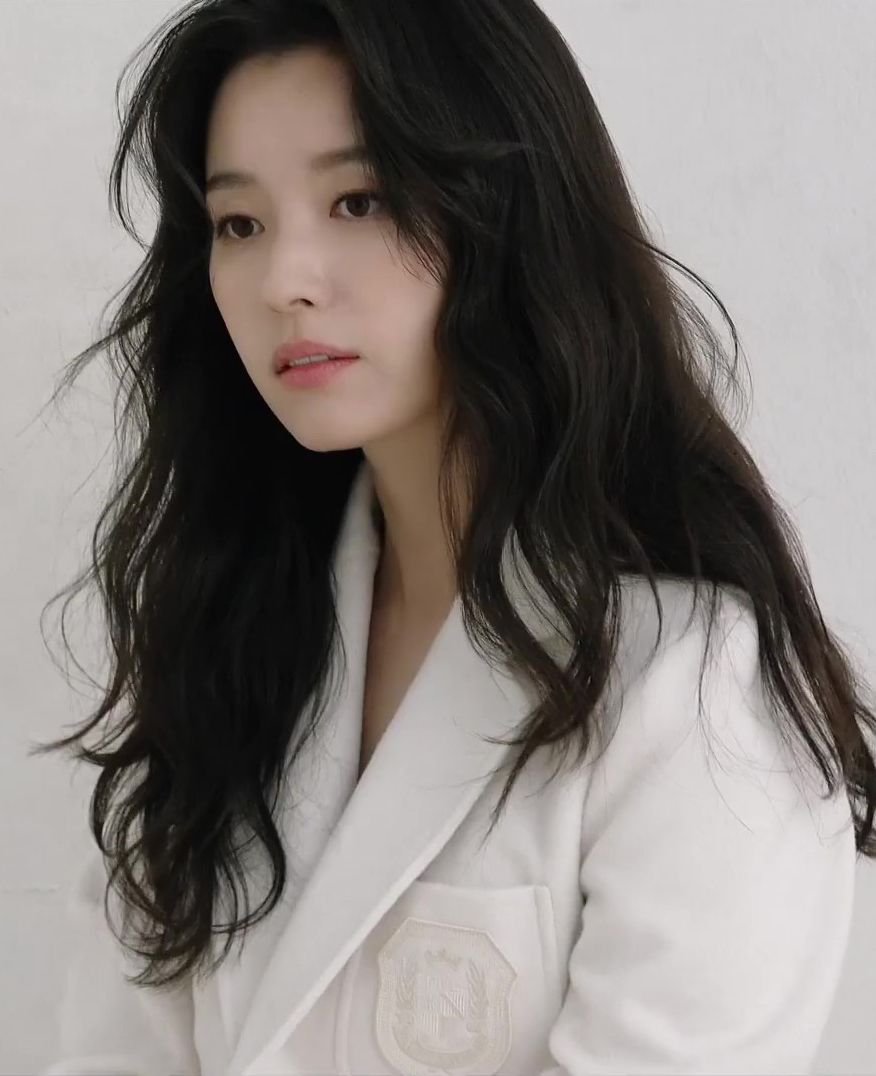
Han Hyo-joo, Blue Dragon Film Awards and Baeksang Arts Awards Best Actress winner

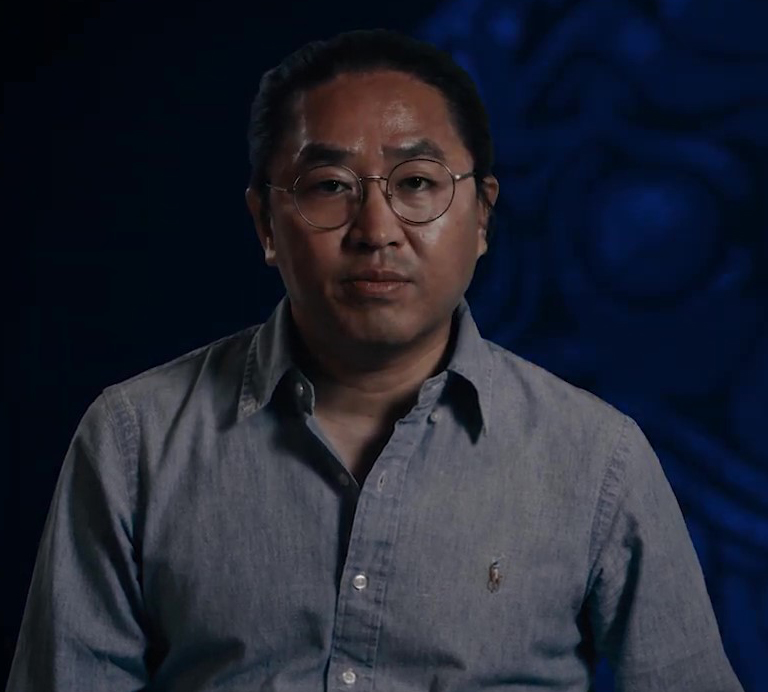
Kim Han-min, film director of The Admiral: Roaring Currents, the highest-grossing film of all time in South Korea

The police administration major in Dongguk University was founded in 1962, and alumni of Police administration major are spread out across South Korean police organisations, intelligence institutes, and judicial organisations including Korean National Police Agency. Also to prepare for the Korean reunification and to research North Korea–South Korea relations, in 1994 the university installed the North Korean studies major for the first time in Korea. In 2017, a North Korean studies alumnus Suh Hoon was appointed as the 22nd director of National Intelligence Service of South Korea.

The Division of Theatre & Film and Media was established for the first time in South Korea in 1960. Alumni include Sunmi, Lee Deok-hwa, Choi Min-sik, Cho Yeo-jeong, Lee Kyu-hyung, Han Suk-kyu, Kim Hye-soo, Jun Ji-hyun, Lee Seung-gi, Han Hyo-joo, Park Min-young, Lee Jae-yoon, Hahm Eun-jung, Im Yoon-ah, Son Na-eun, Seohyun, Choi Woo-sung, and Kim Ji-won. In particular, Lee Seung-gi and Han Hyo-joo are close friends from the same cohort who co-starred in the drama series Brilliant Legacy. Singer-songwriter Young K of the rock band Day6 is also an alumnus but graduated with a bachelor's in Business Administration.

Dongguk University alumni also have found success in professional sports and arts. Alumni in professional sport include baseball player Kim Seong-han, Han Dae-hwa, Song Jin-woo, Park Han-yi, footballer Ahn Hyo-yeon and mountaineer Park Young-seok, and alumni in arts include novelist Hwang Sok-yong, Jo Jung-rae, poet Shin Kyeong-nim, Moon Chung-hee and painter Seok Cheoljoo.

== Dispute with Yale University ==
In 2008, the university sued Yale University for 50 million dollars for a national scandal involved with then-assistant professor Shin Jeong-ah, which was called "Shingate". In July 2007, when Dongguk university sent a registered letter to Yale in order to check whether her doctorate degree is fake, Yale sent a reply that her degree is a forgery and she was never enrolled in the university. Dongguk University asserted that when the university was hiring Shin Jeong-ah as an assistant professor of Graduate School of Culture & Arts in September 2005, the university had received an answer from Yale that her doctorate degree is authentic. In July 2007, Yale contended that the Dongguk University's claim is not true and the university had not received any official letters from Dongguk University, but later it was revealed that Yale had received the registered letter from Dongguk University. On December 27, Dongguk University held a press conference and announced that Yale had admitted that the university confirmed the authenticity of her degree and expressed regret about the case. On February 1, 2008, Yale forwarded an official letter of apology to Dongguk University under the name of Rick Levin, then-president of Yale. Dongguk University claimed that actions of Yale had damaged the university's reputation and sued Yale for 50 million dollars. Dongguk University said that it lost millions in contributions and the opportunity to build a new law school, but the lawsuit was finally concluded with Yale's innocence over the scandal. After the lawsuit, Yale sued Dongguk University for the cost of litigation, and on December 2, 2014, the Seoul Central District Court ordered Dongguk University to pay 297,000 dollars.

== Media ==
A student-run daily newspaper, Dongdae Shinmun (동대신문) was founded on April 15, 1950, and continued to circulate during the Korean War, April Revolution and June Democratic Uprising. Also, a student-run English newspaper, The Dongguk Post was founded in 1965. Both newspapers are overseen by a board of directors of the university and run by a student chief editor.

University broadcasting station, Dongguk University Broadcasting System (DUBS) is founded on September 1, 1959, and focuses on broadcasting educational programmes.

== Gallery ==
Seoul campus of Dongguk University

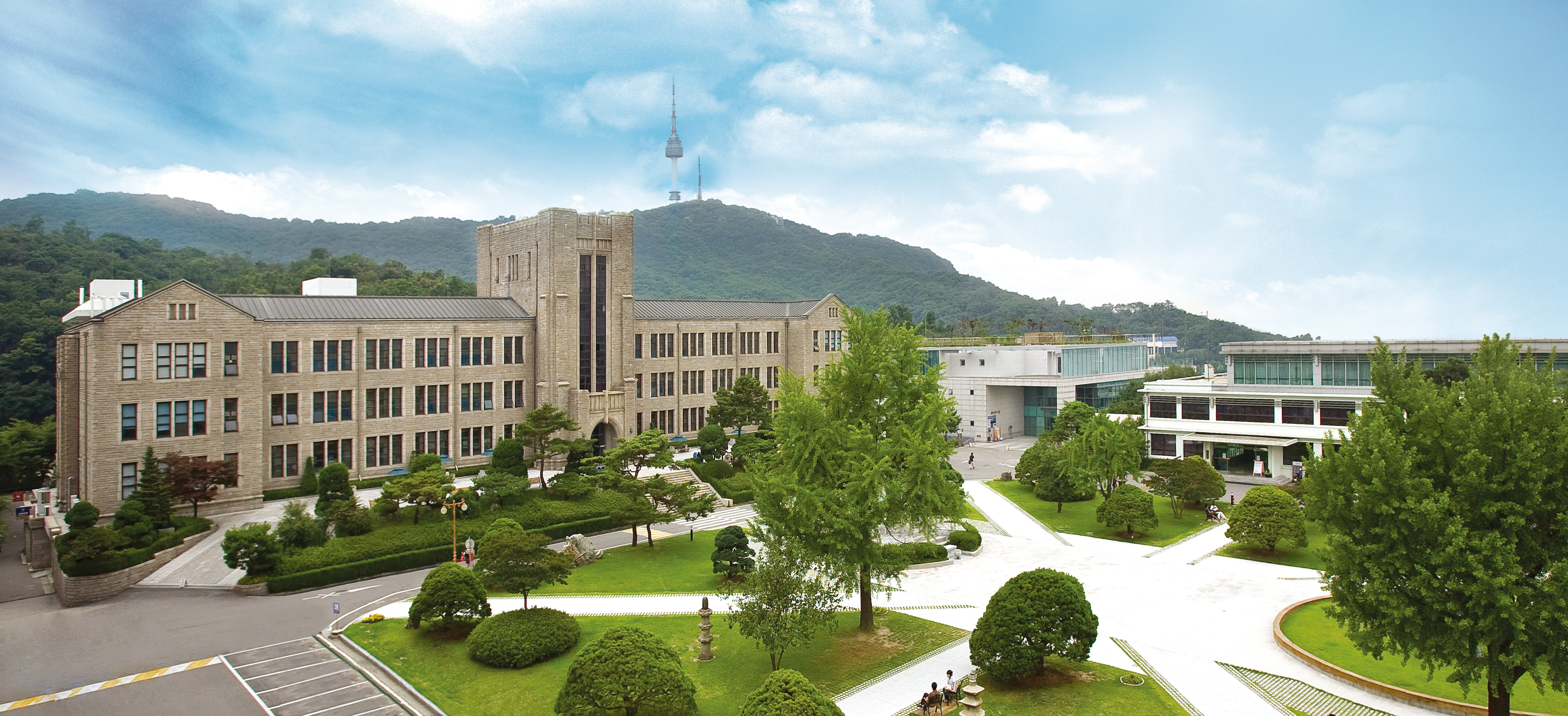
The university

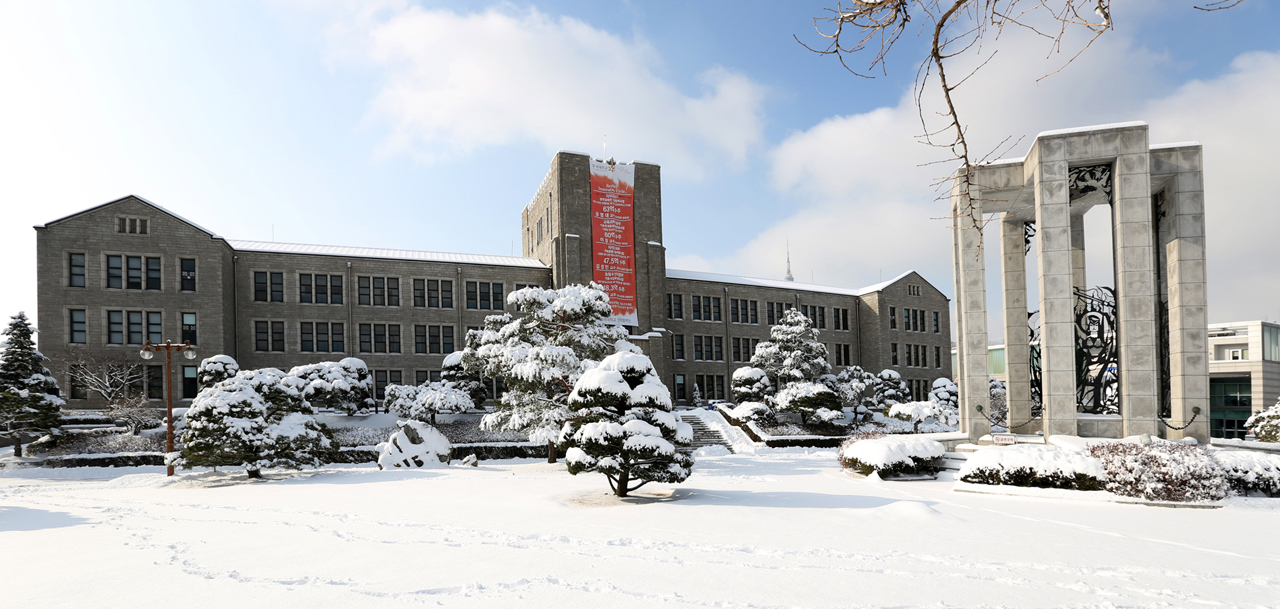
Winter

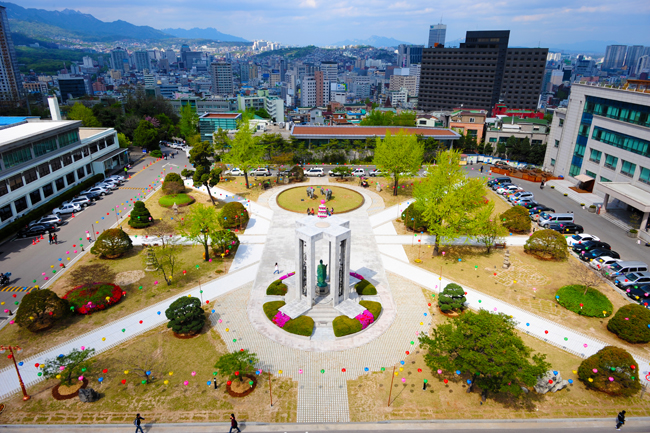
Spring

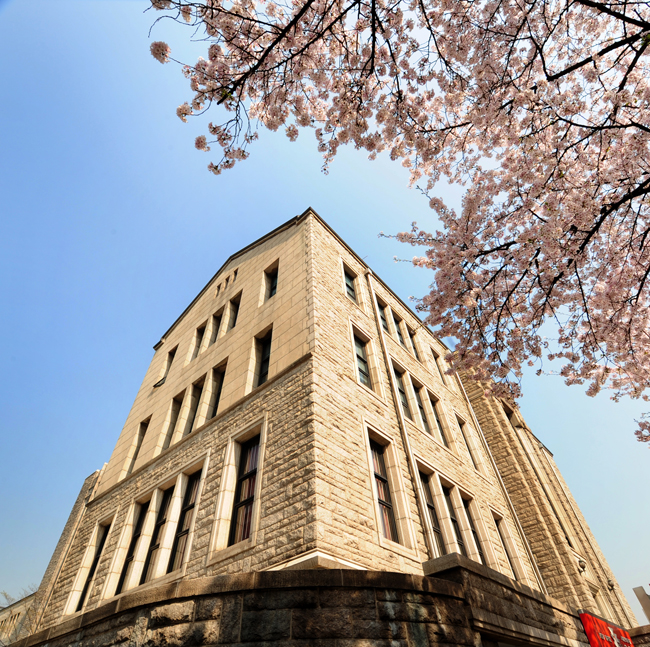
Meongjin-hall

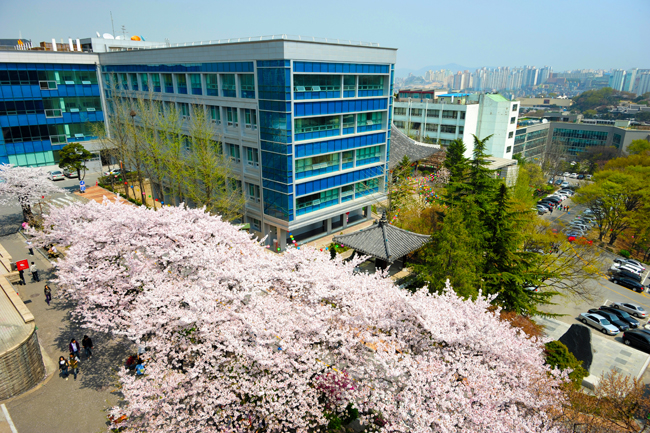
Spring

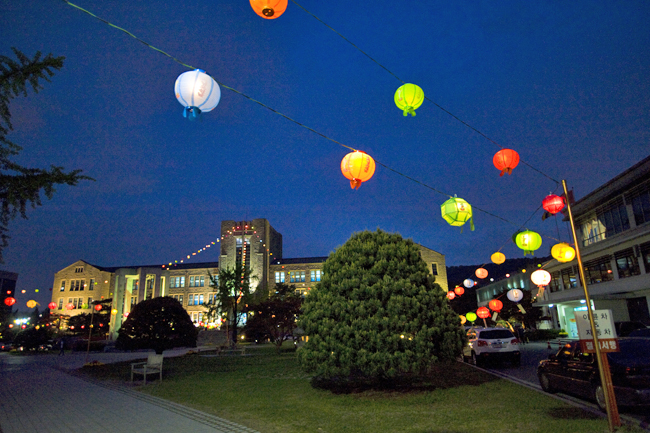
Night

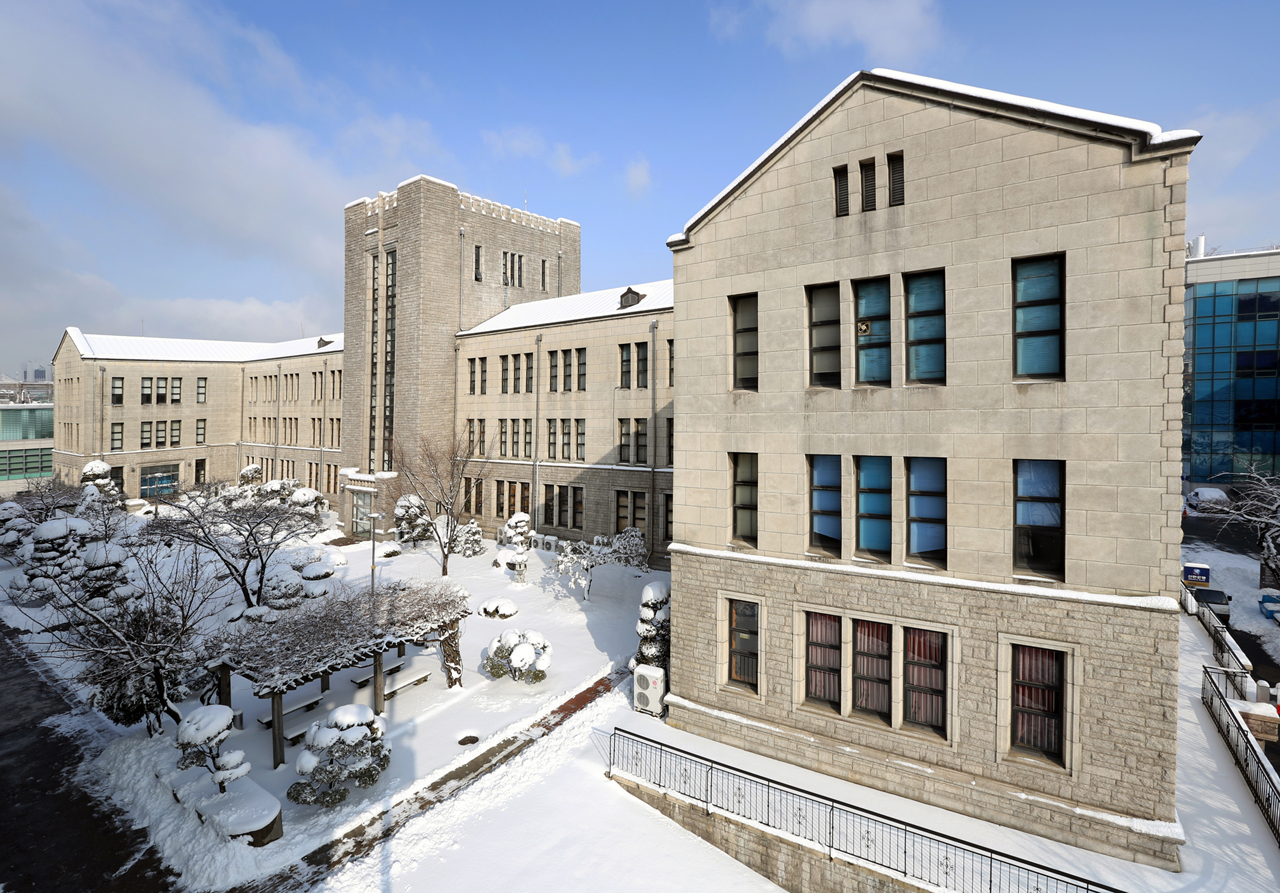
Winter 1

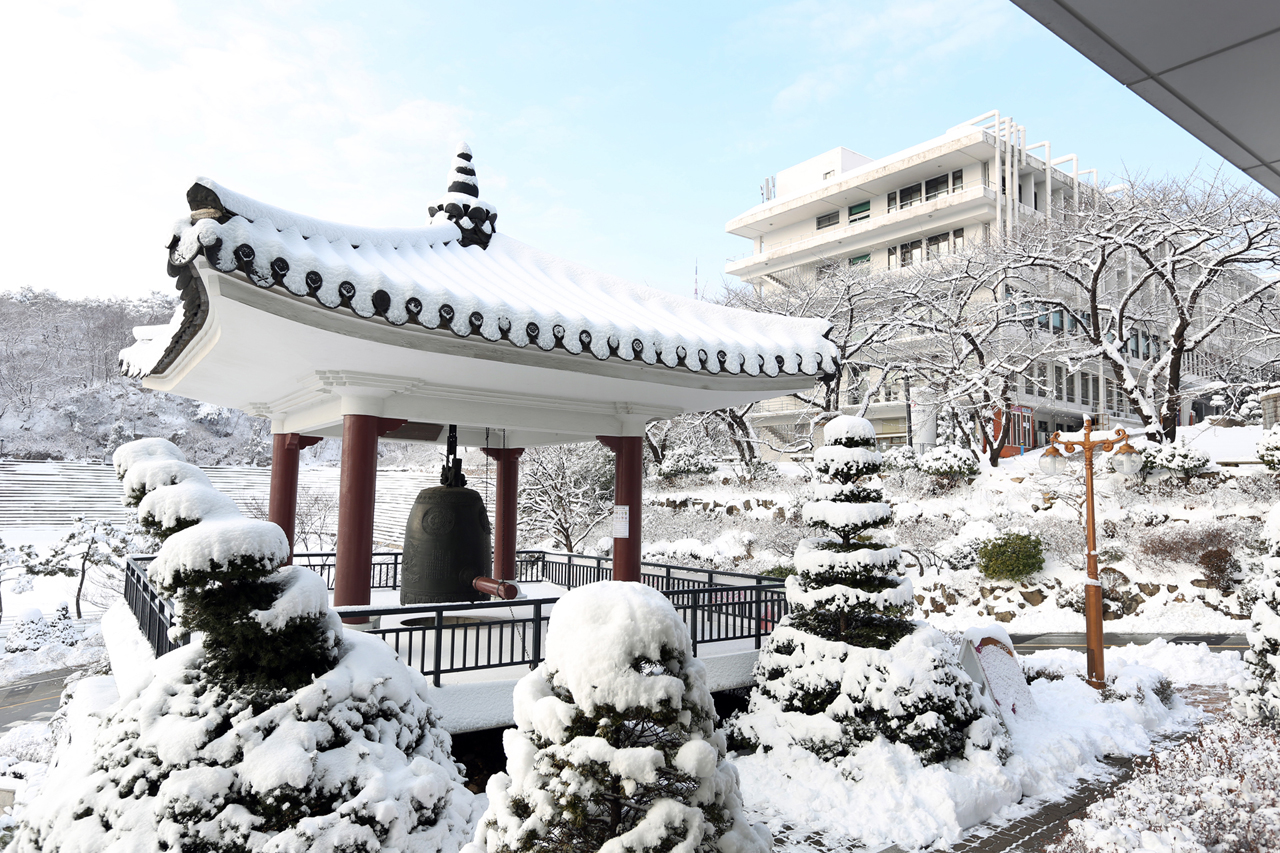
Winter 2

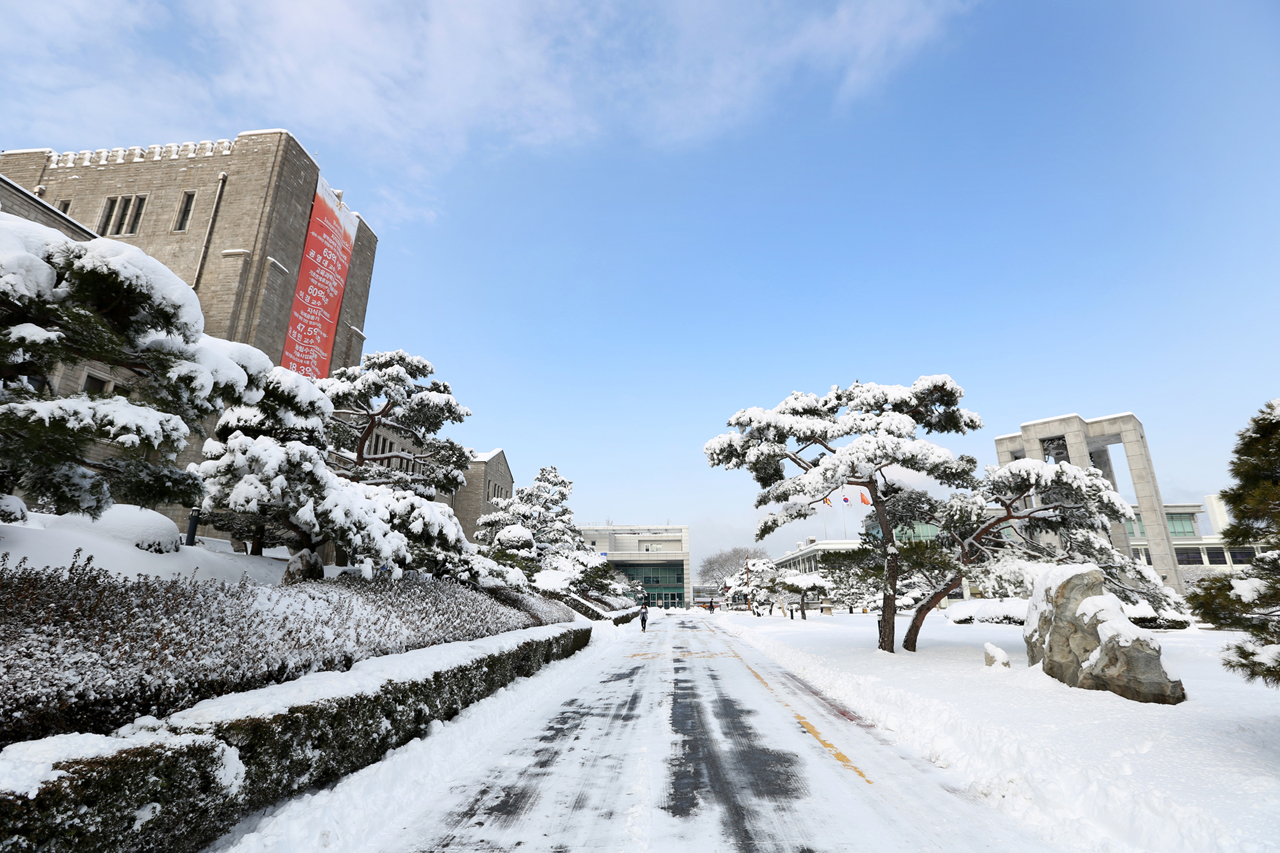
Winter 3

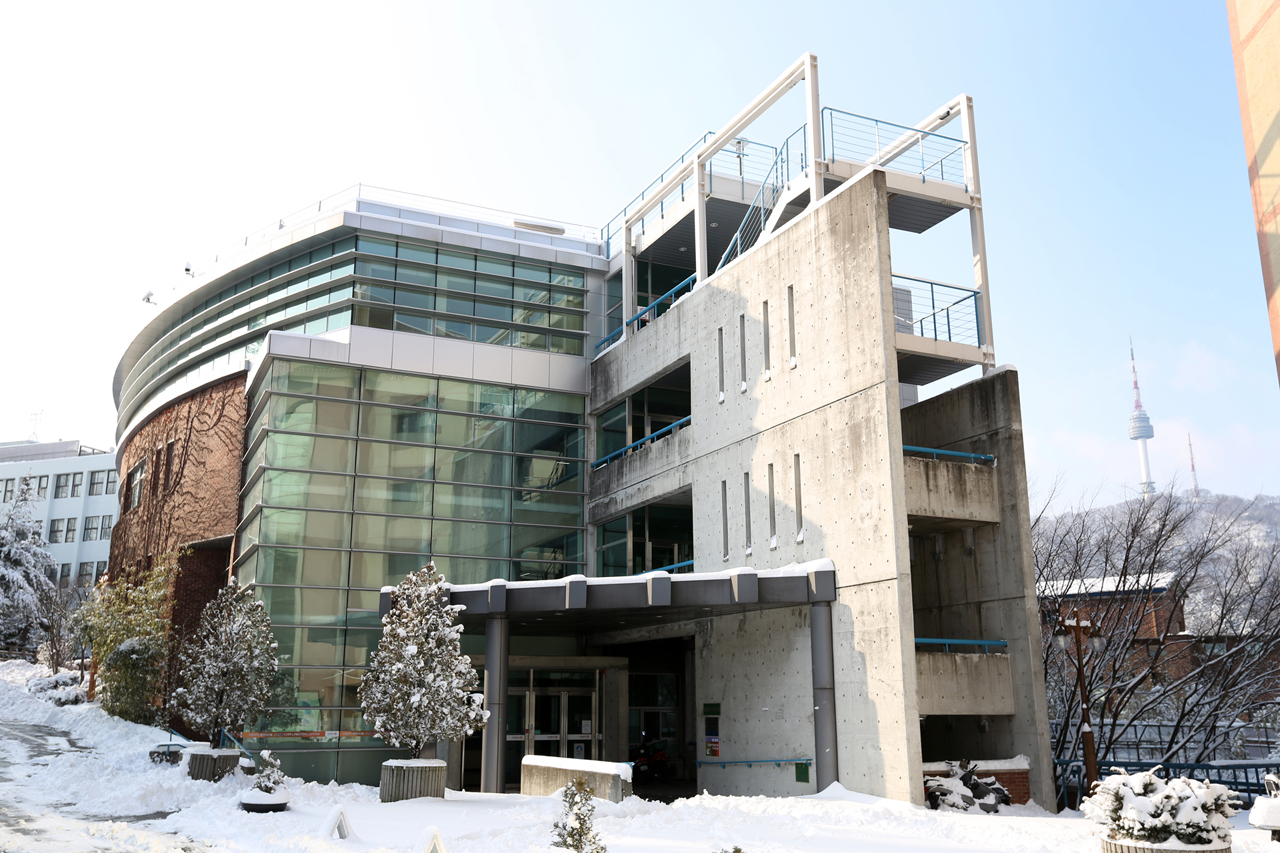
Winter 4

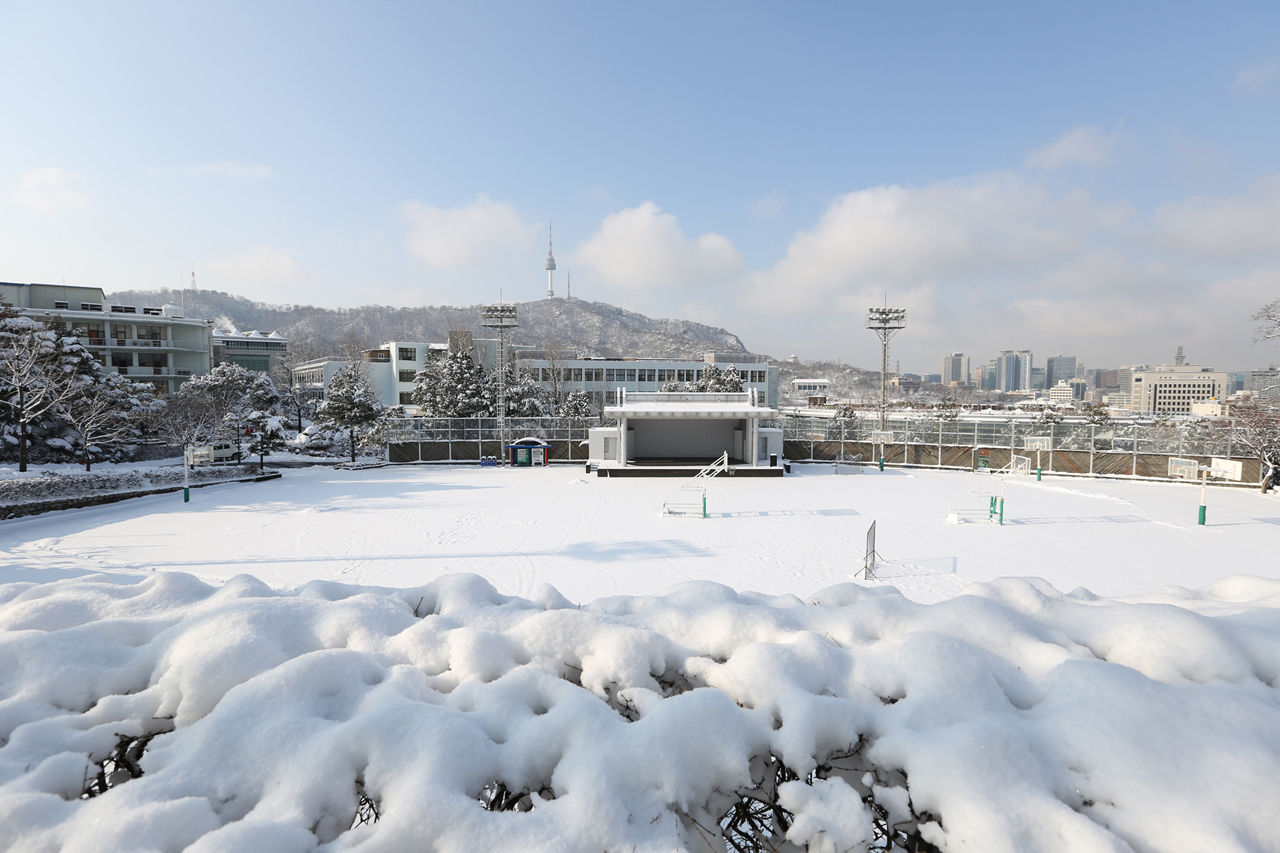
Winter 5

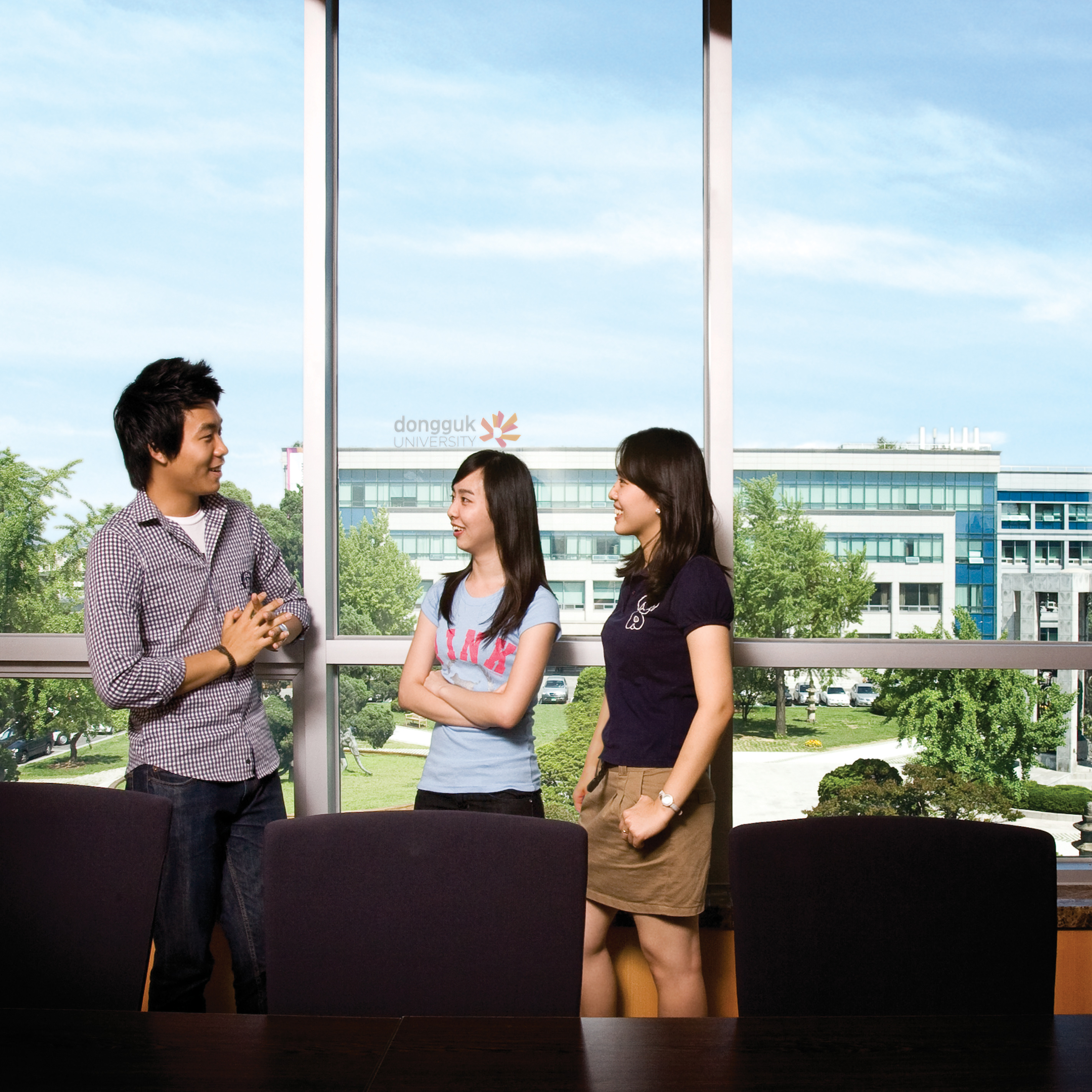

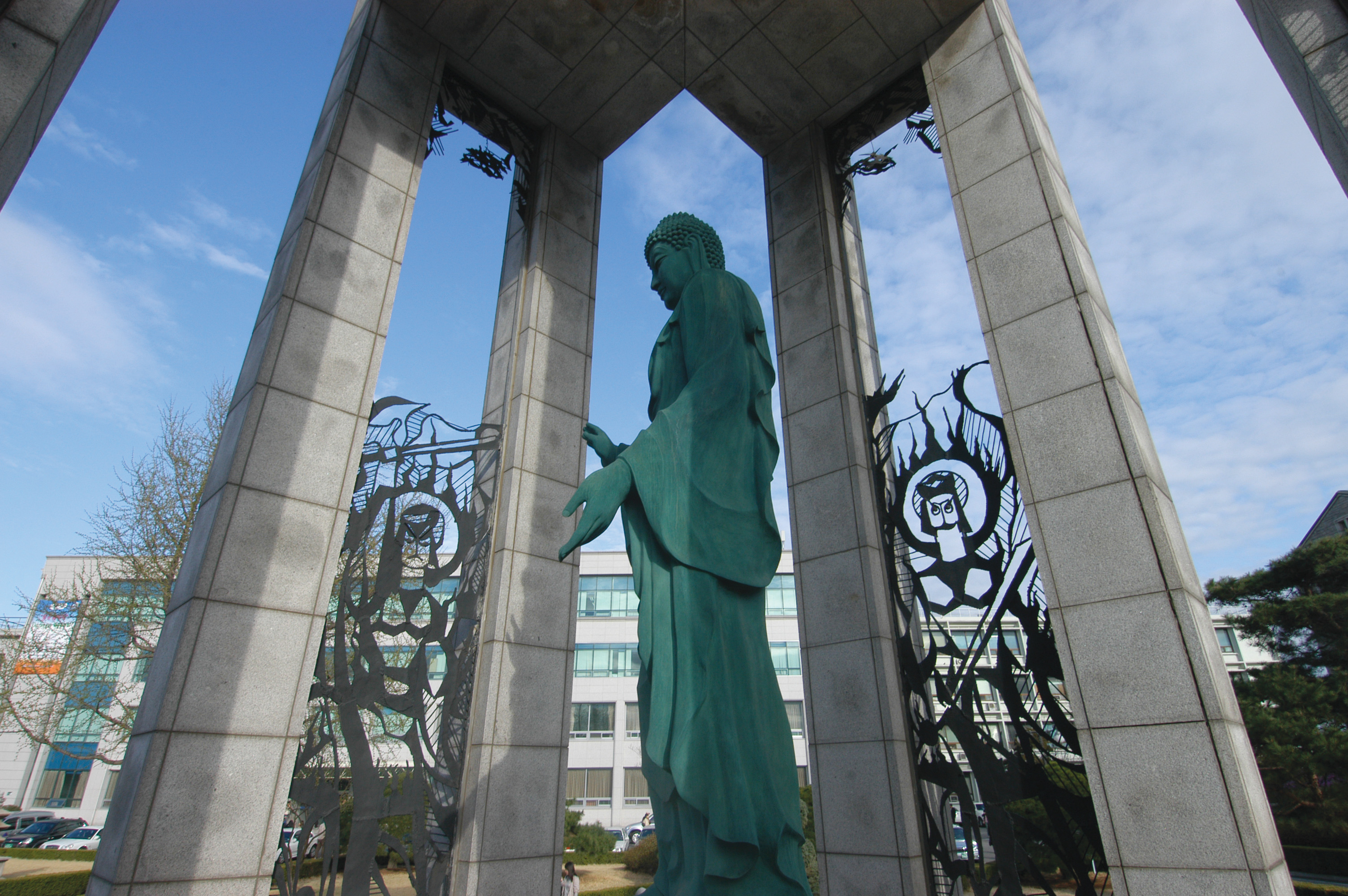

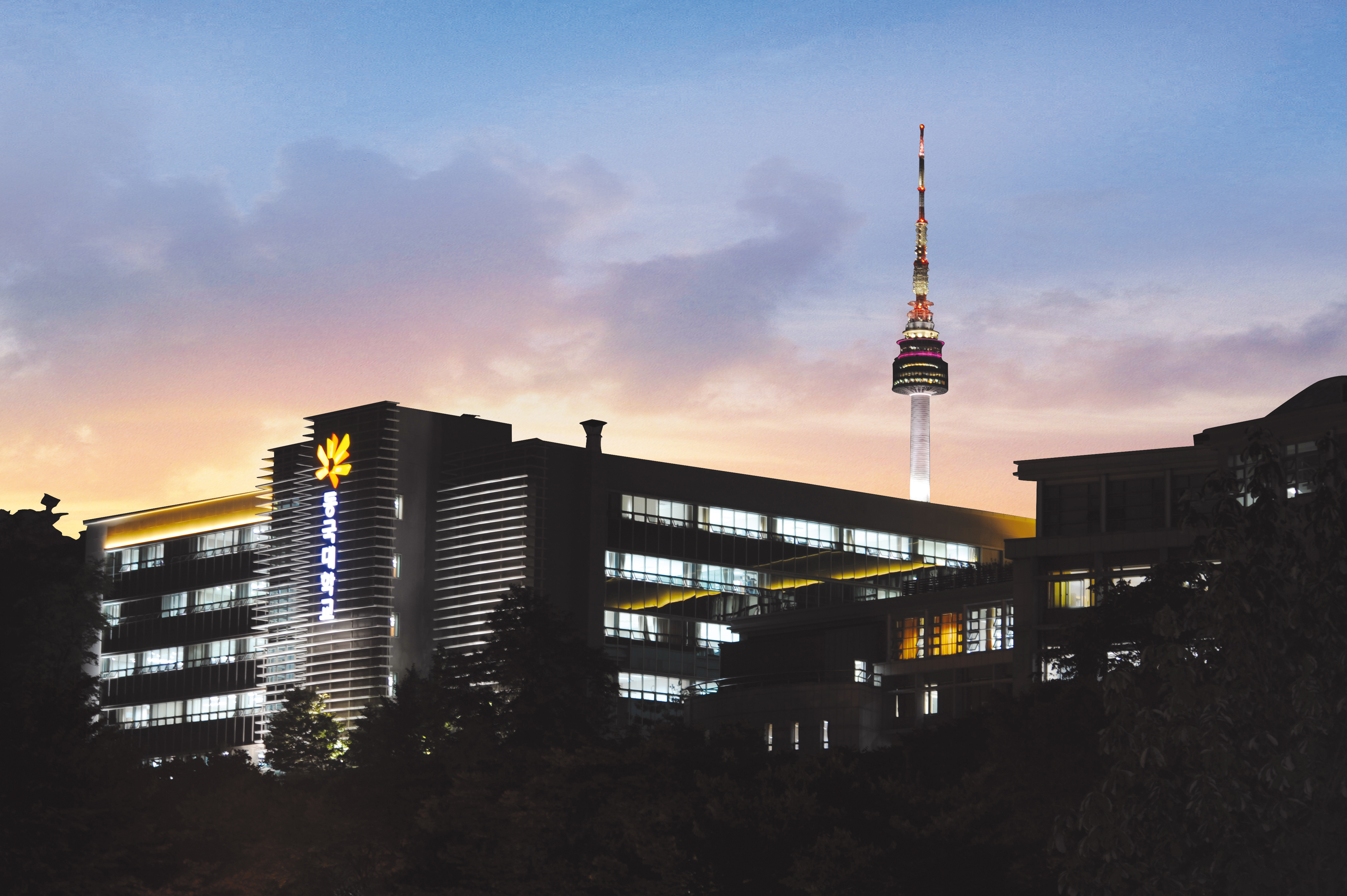

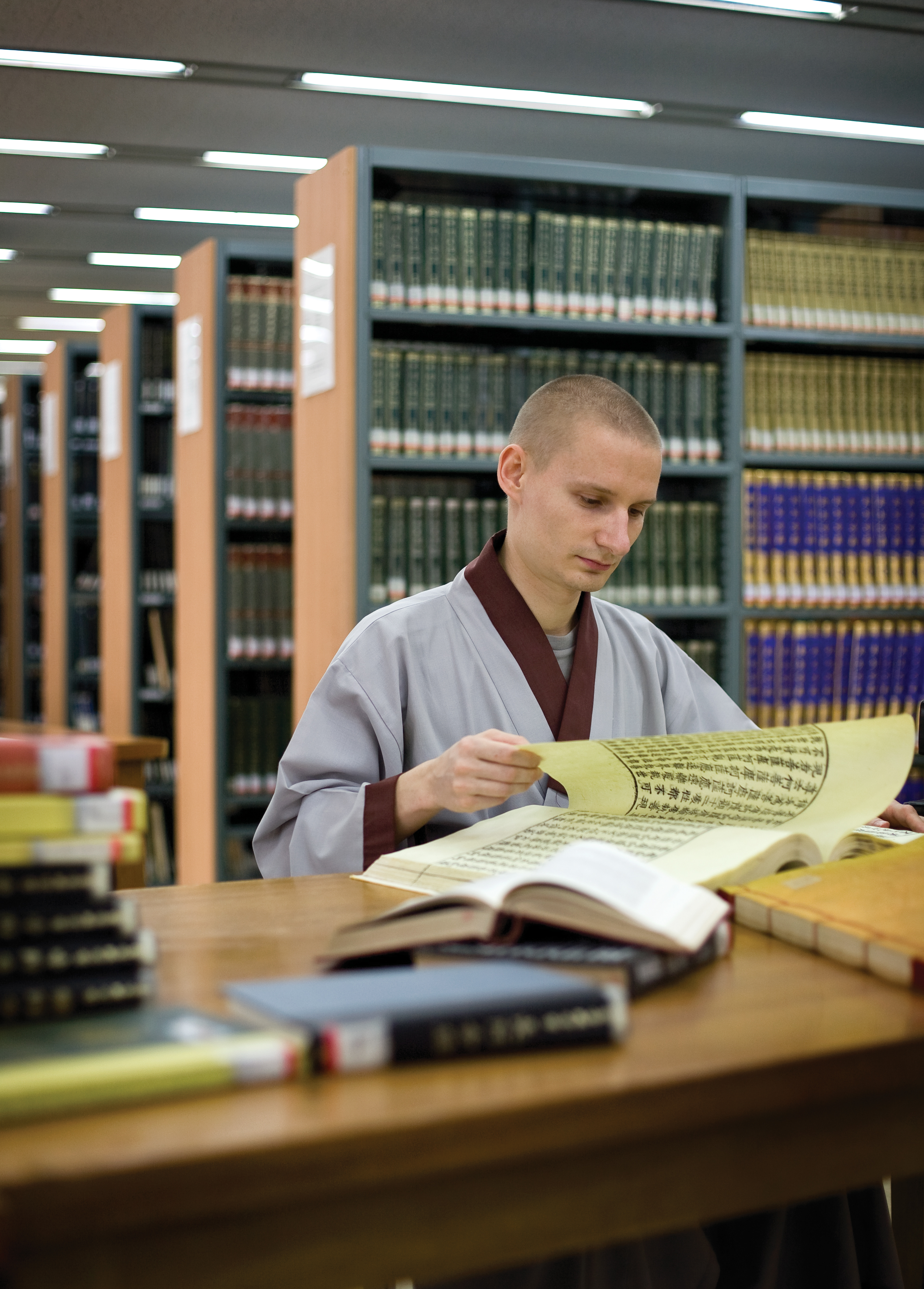

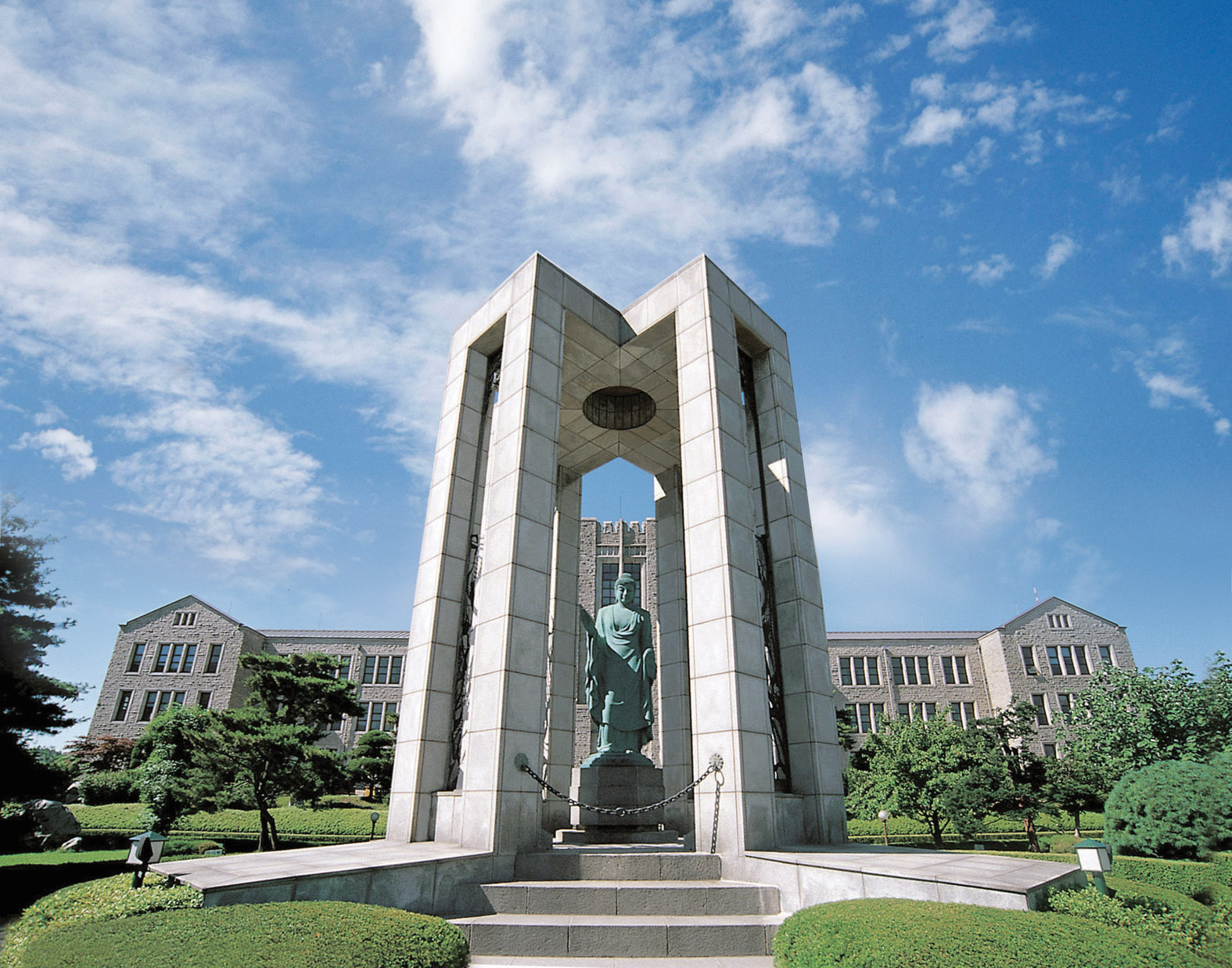

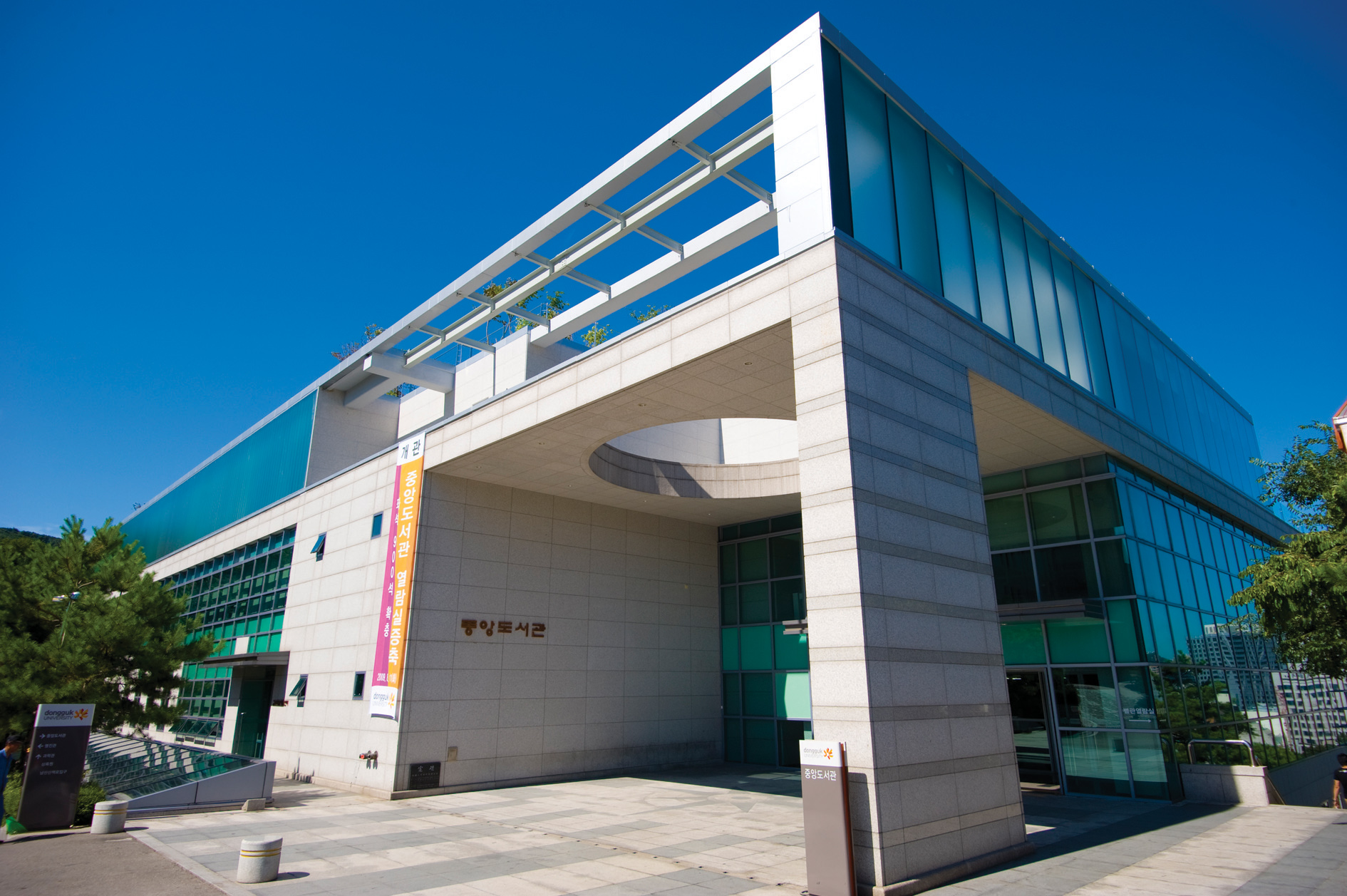
Library

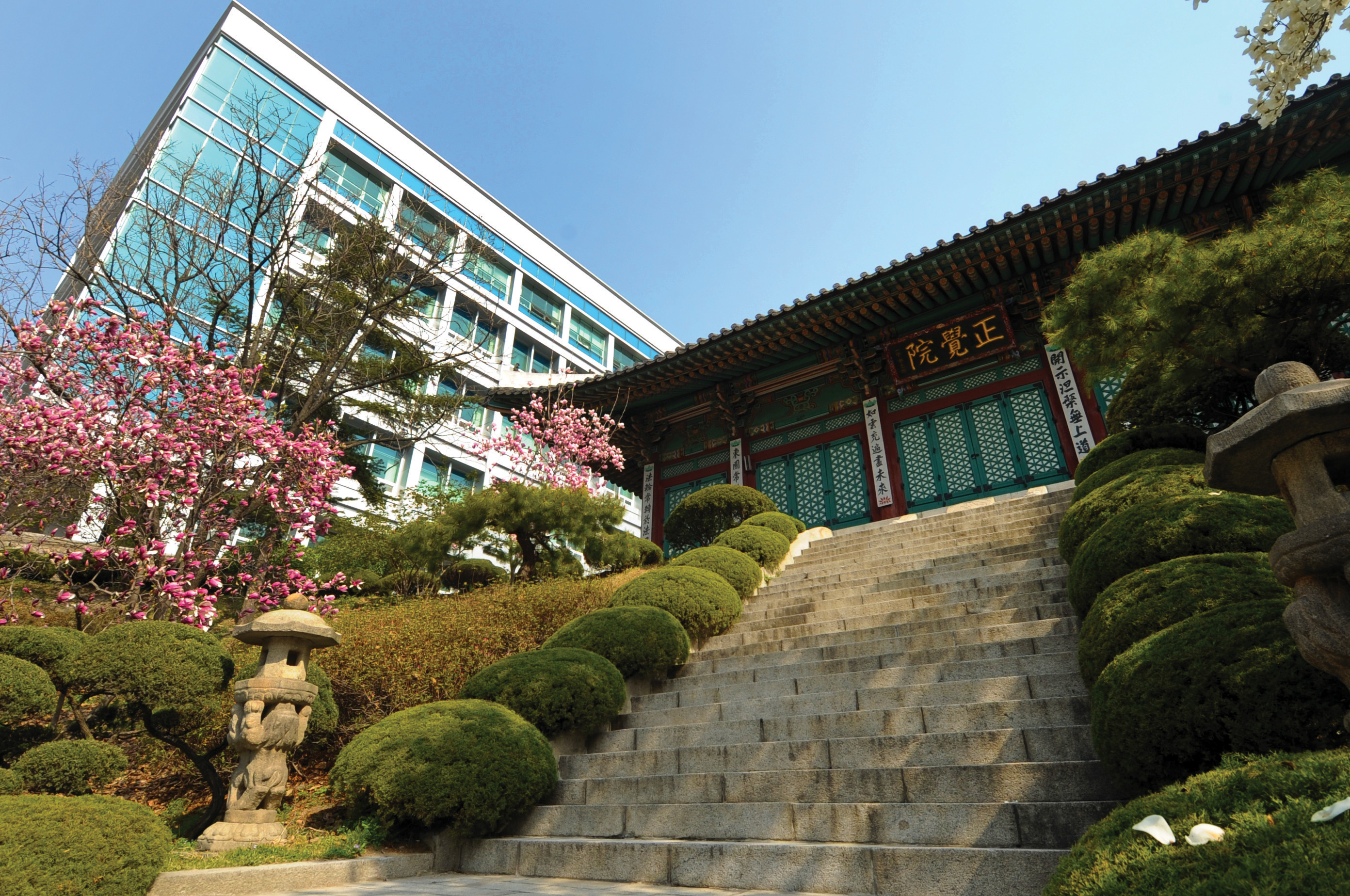
Jeonggakwon (Korean Buddhist)

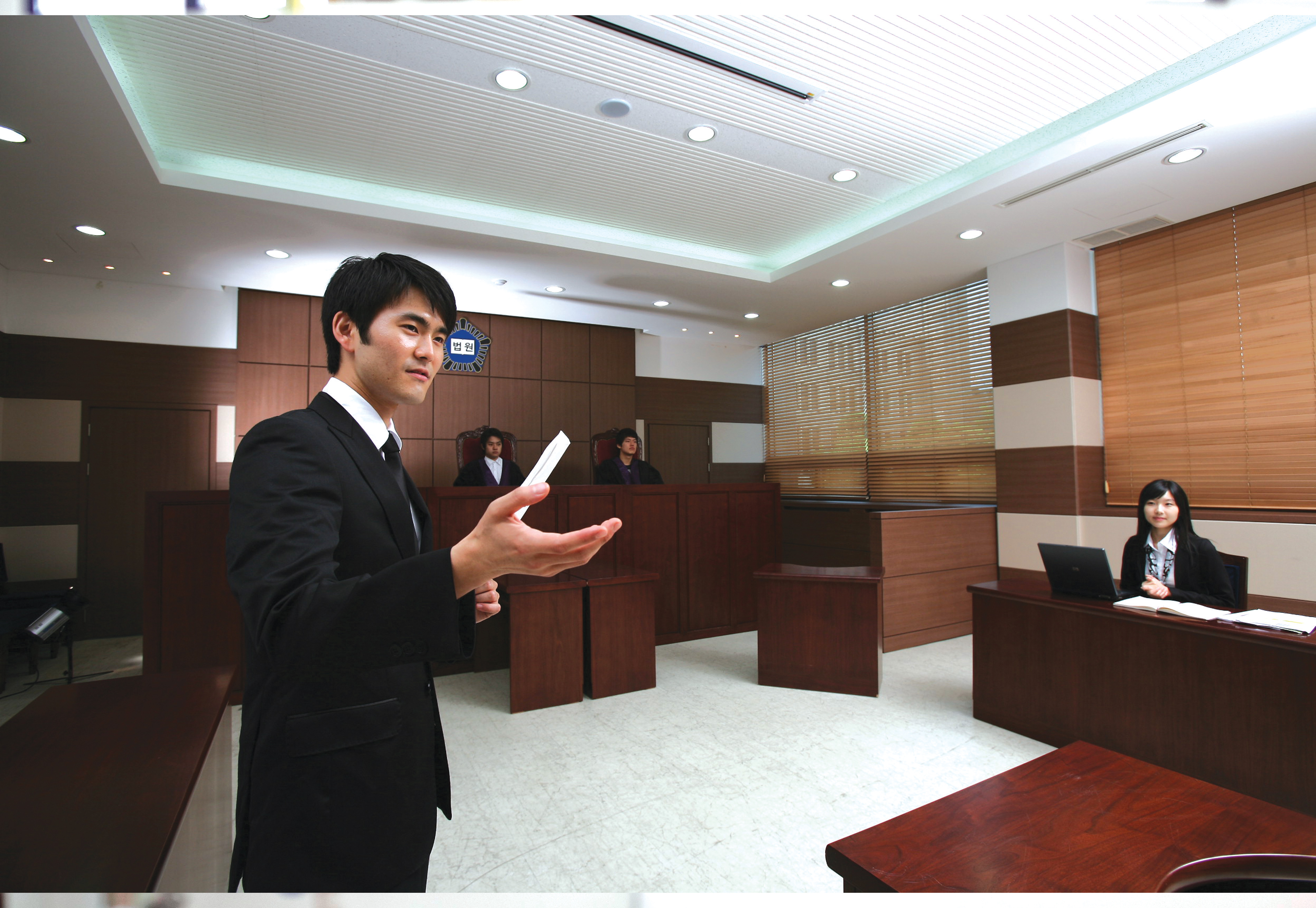
College of Law

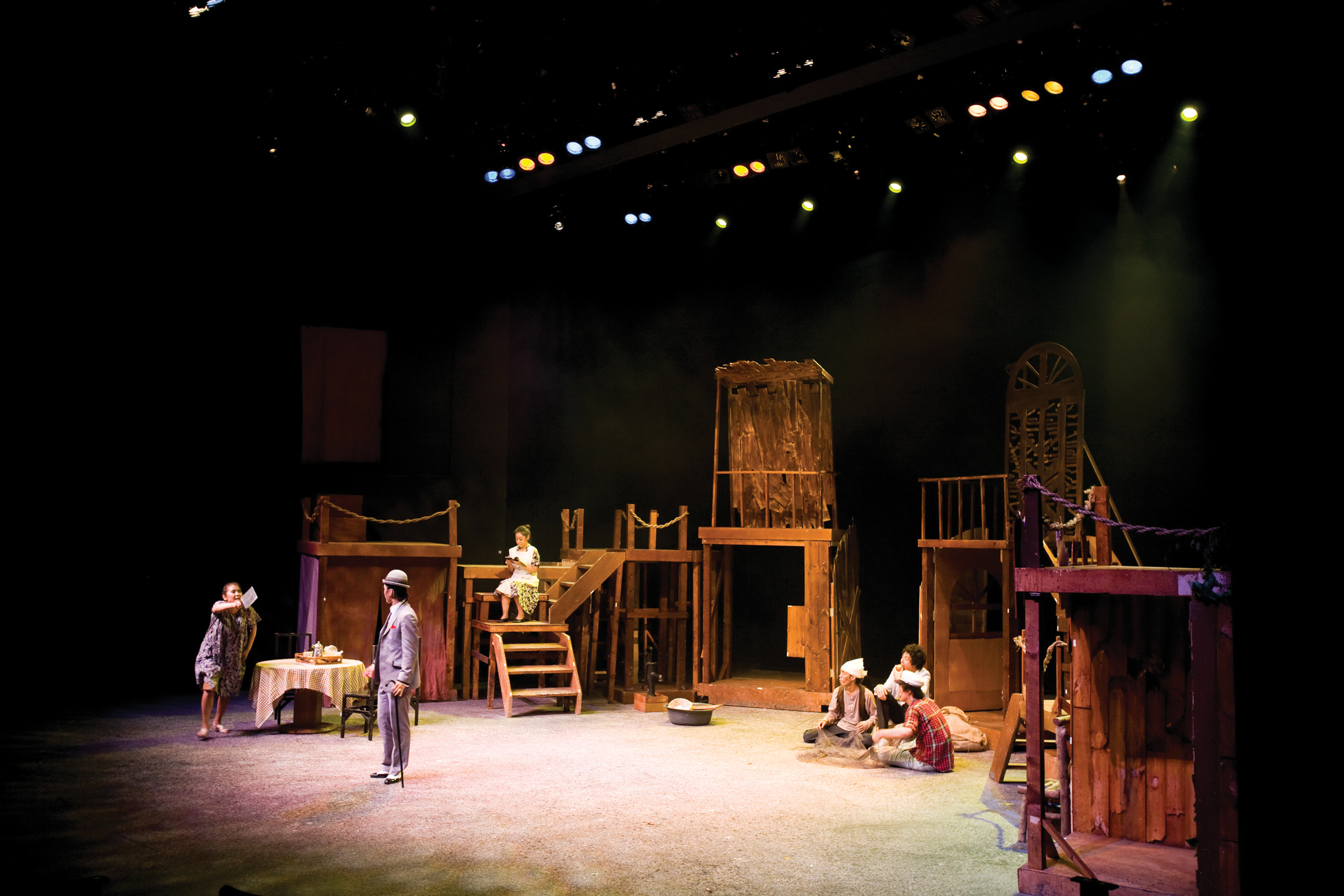
College of Art

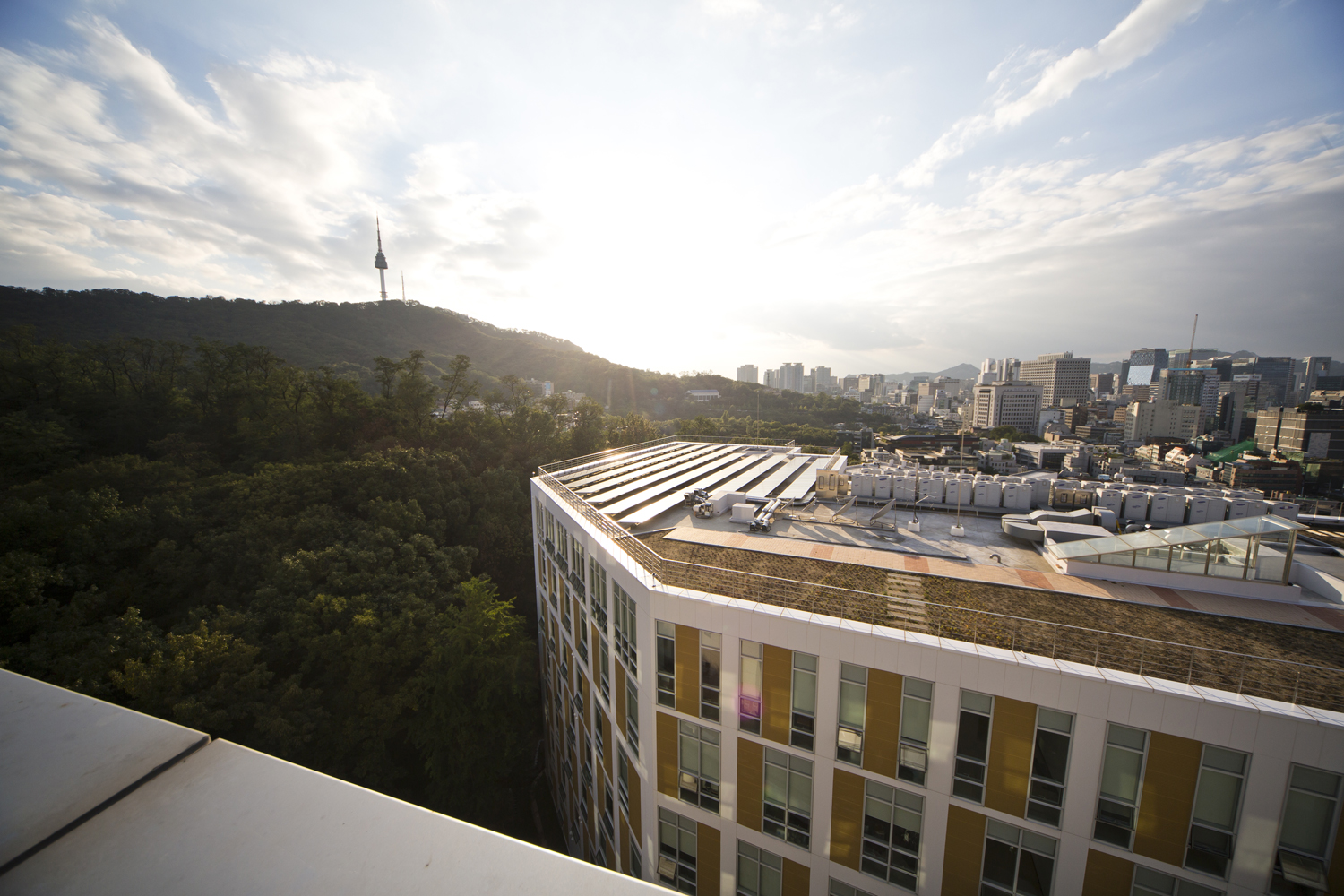

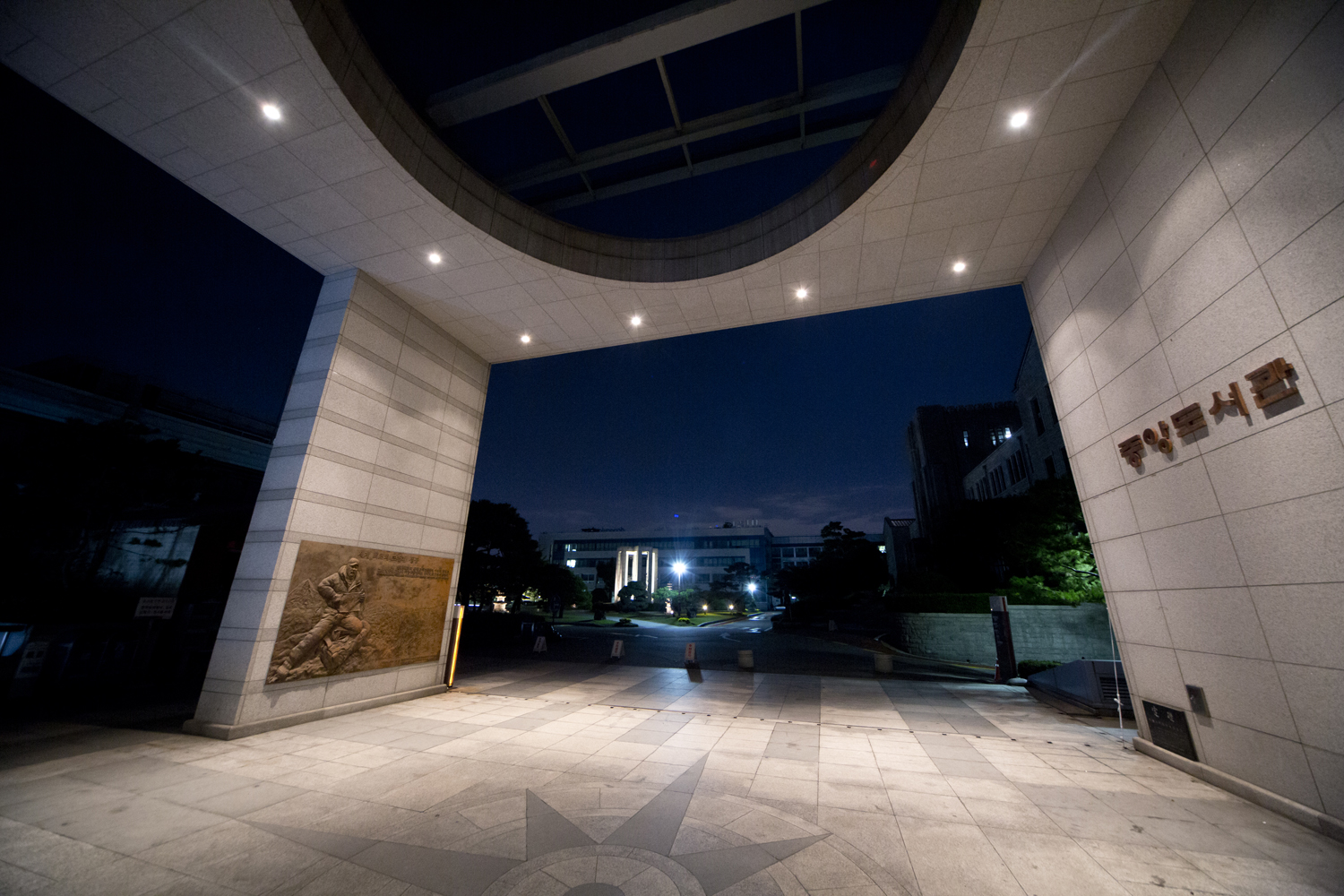
Library

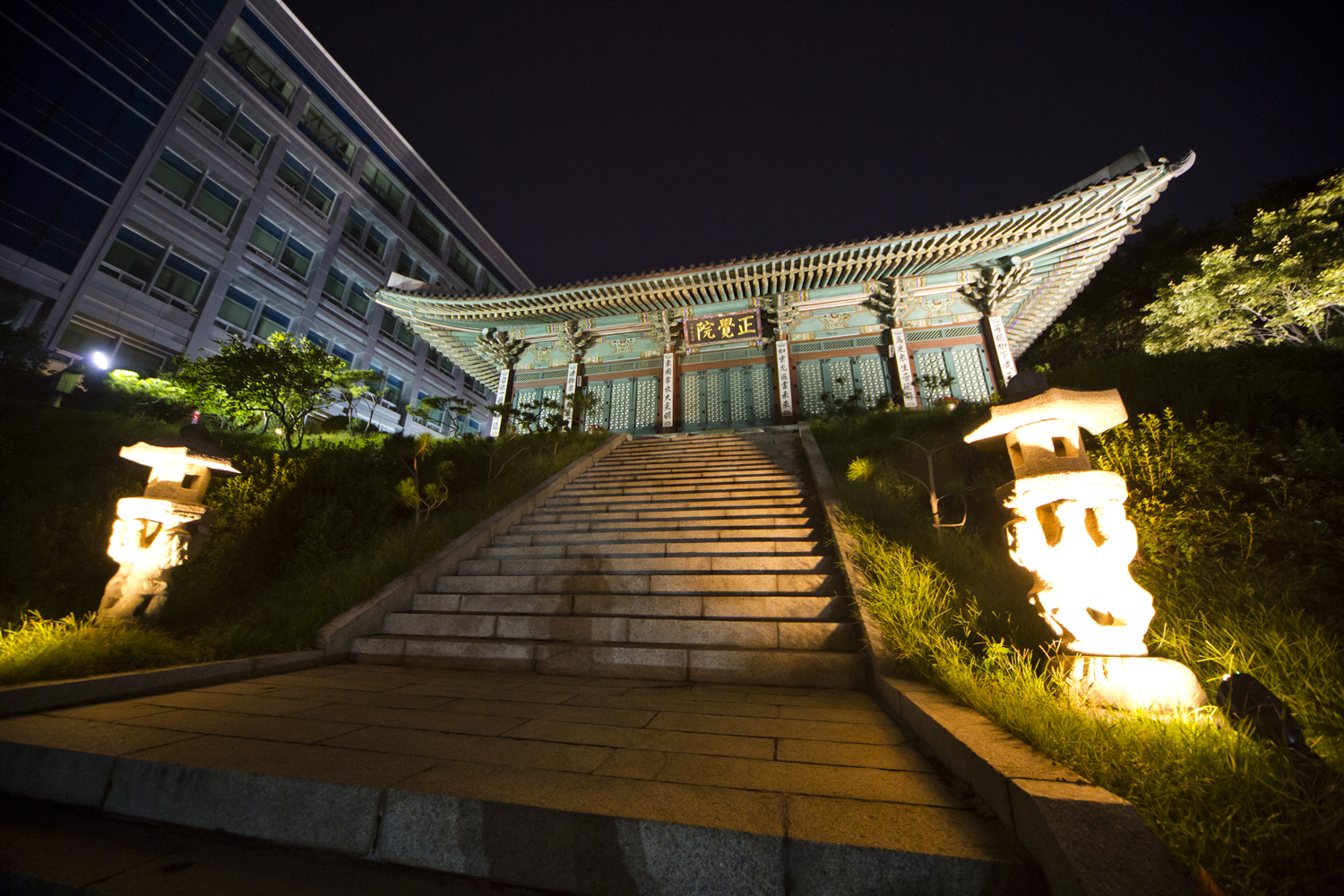
Jeonggakwon (Korean Buddhist)

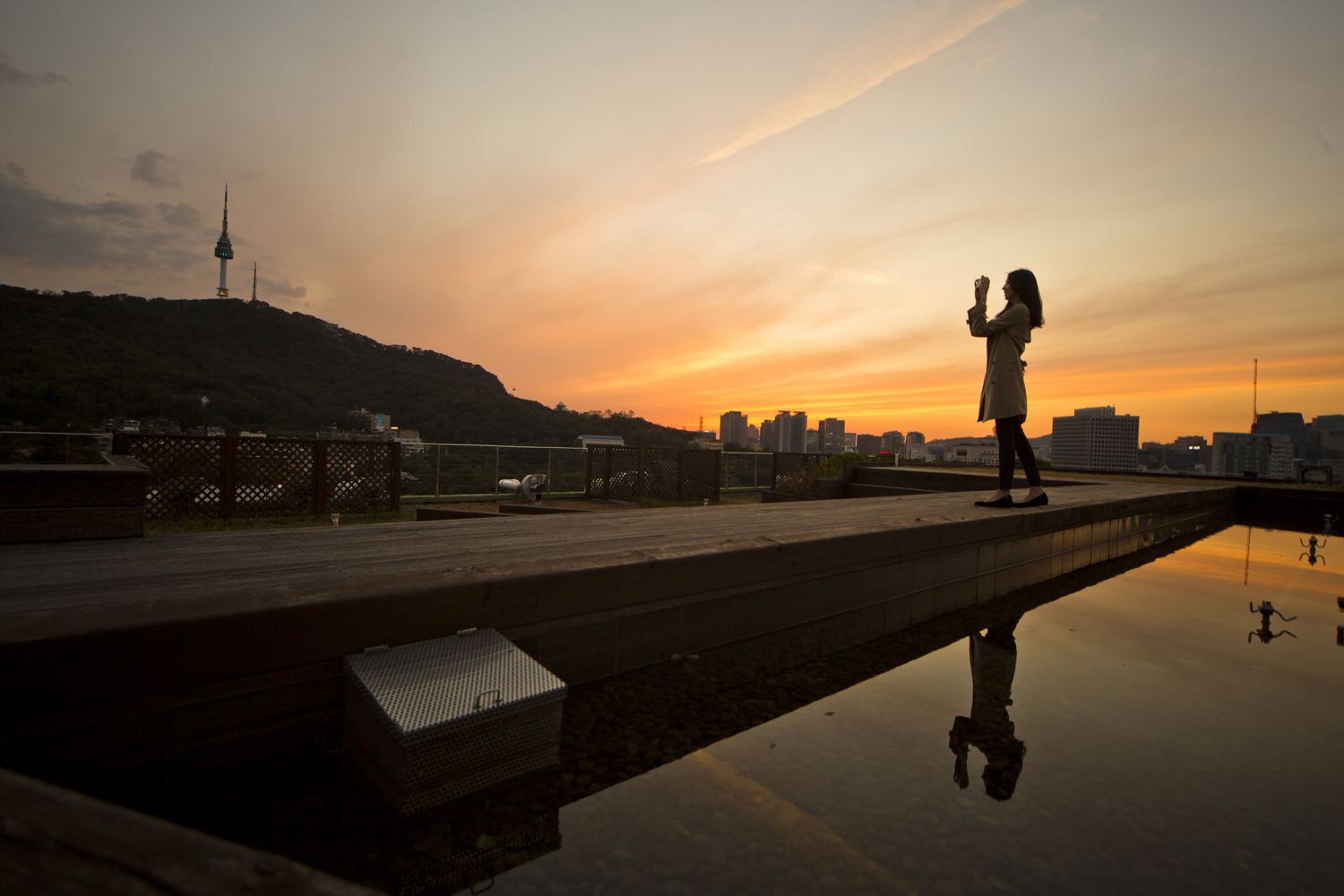

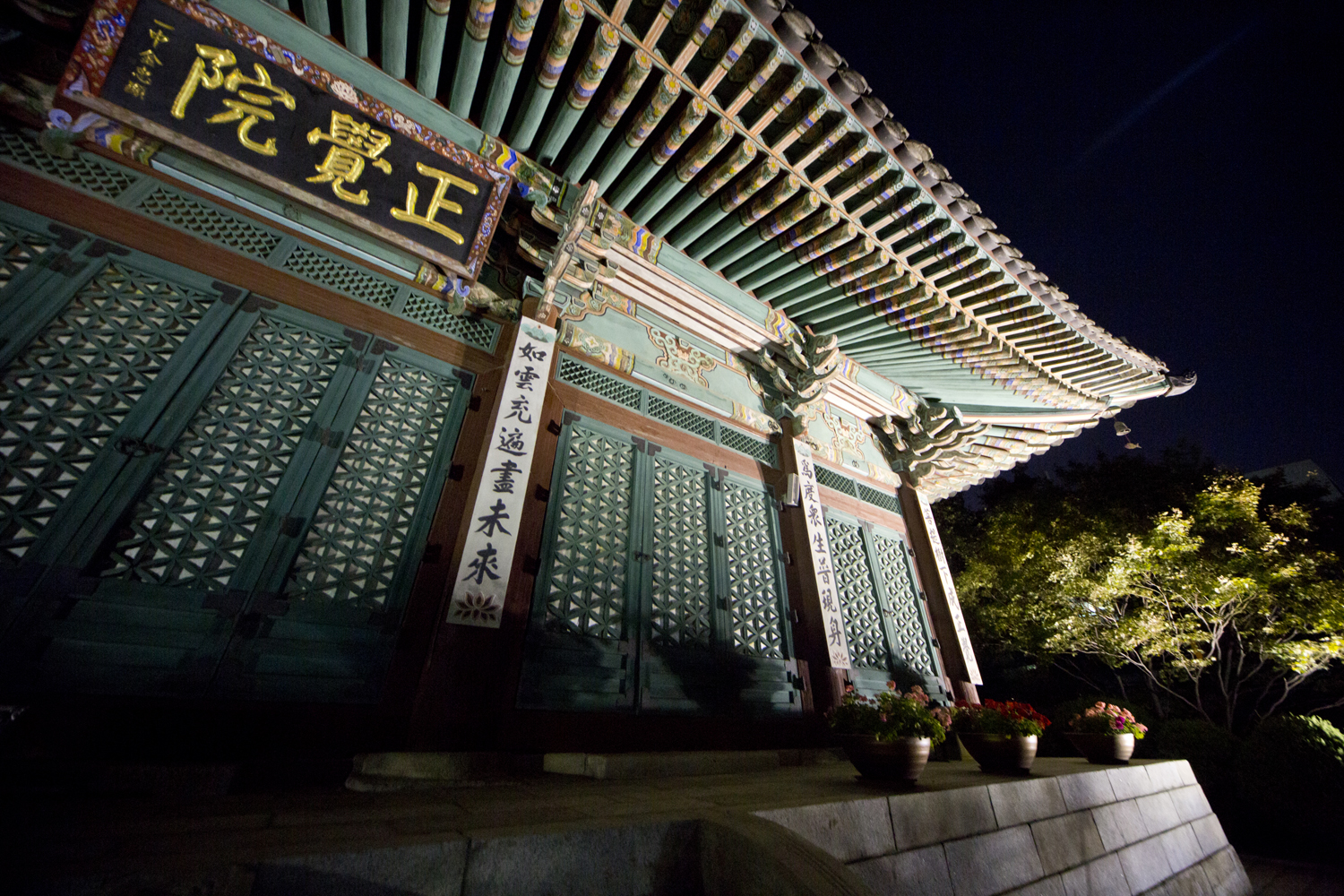
Jeonggakwon (Korean Buddhist)
Gyeongju campus of Dongguk University

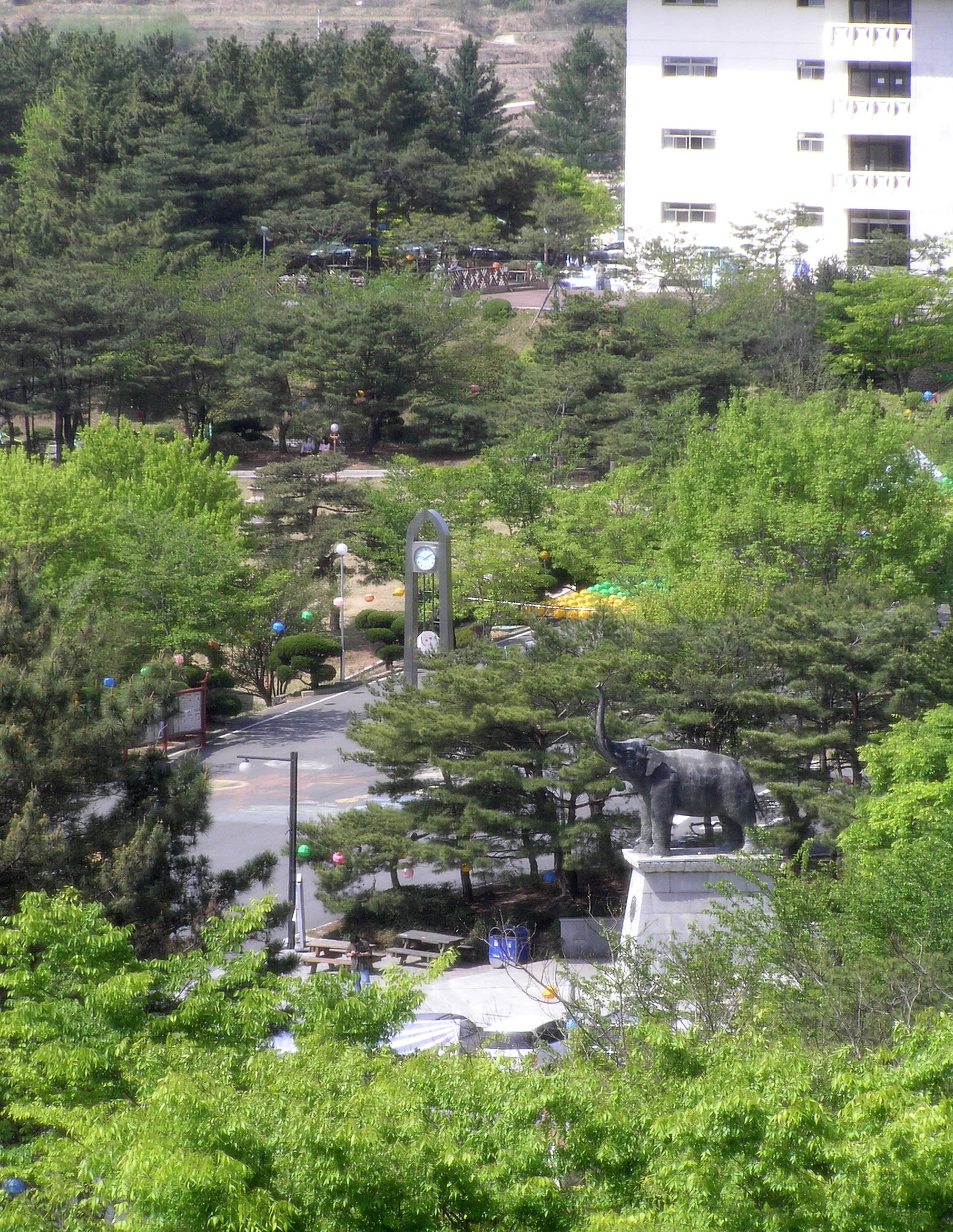
Main Square

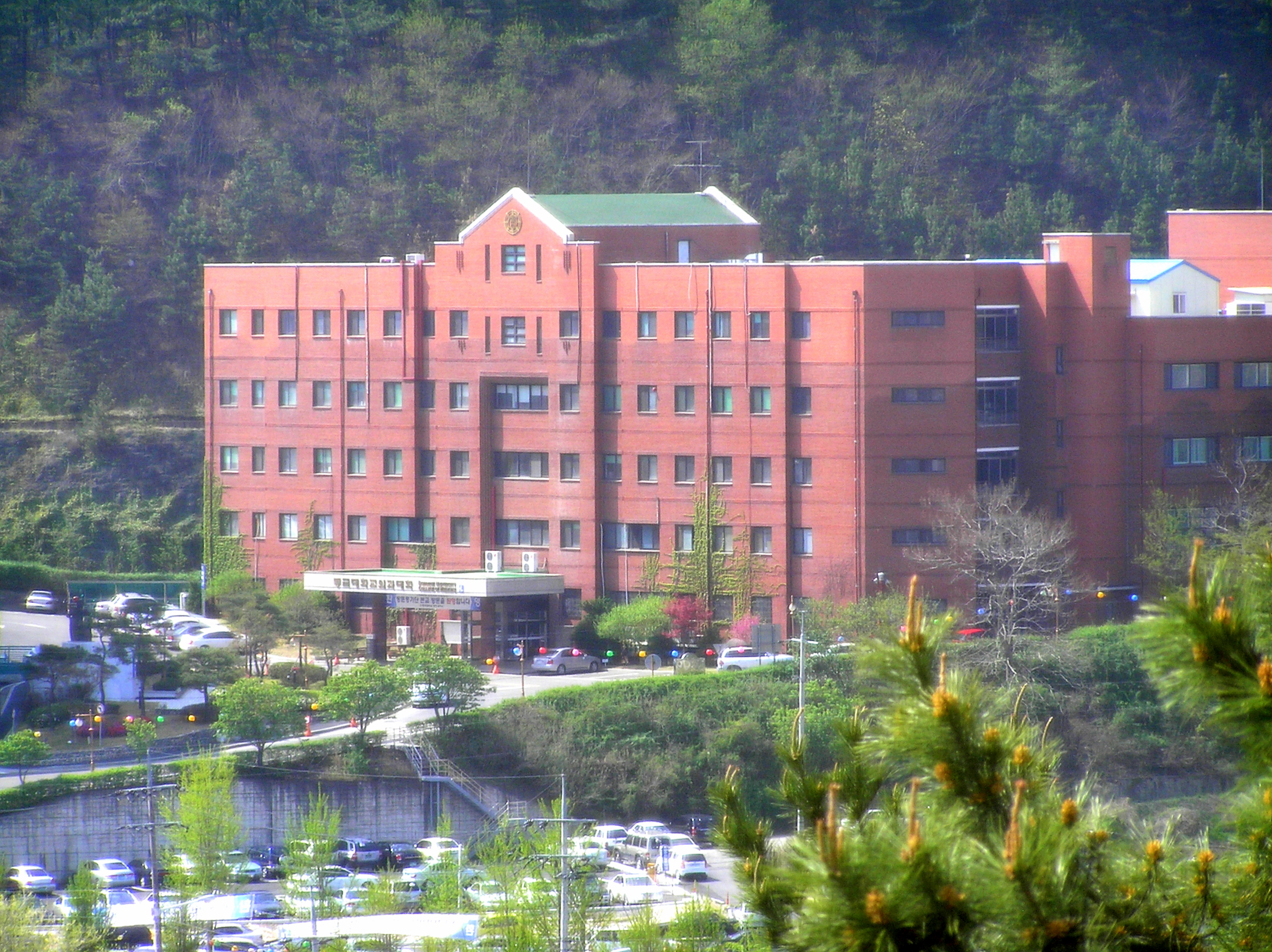
Medical School

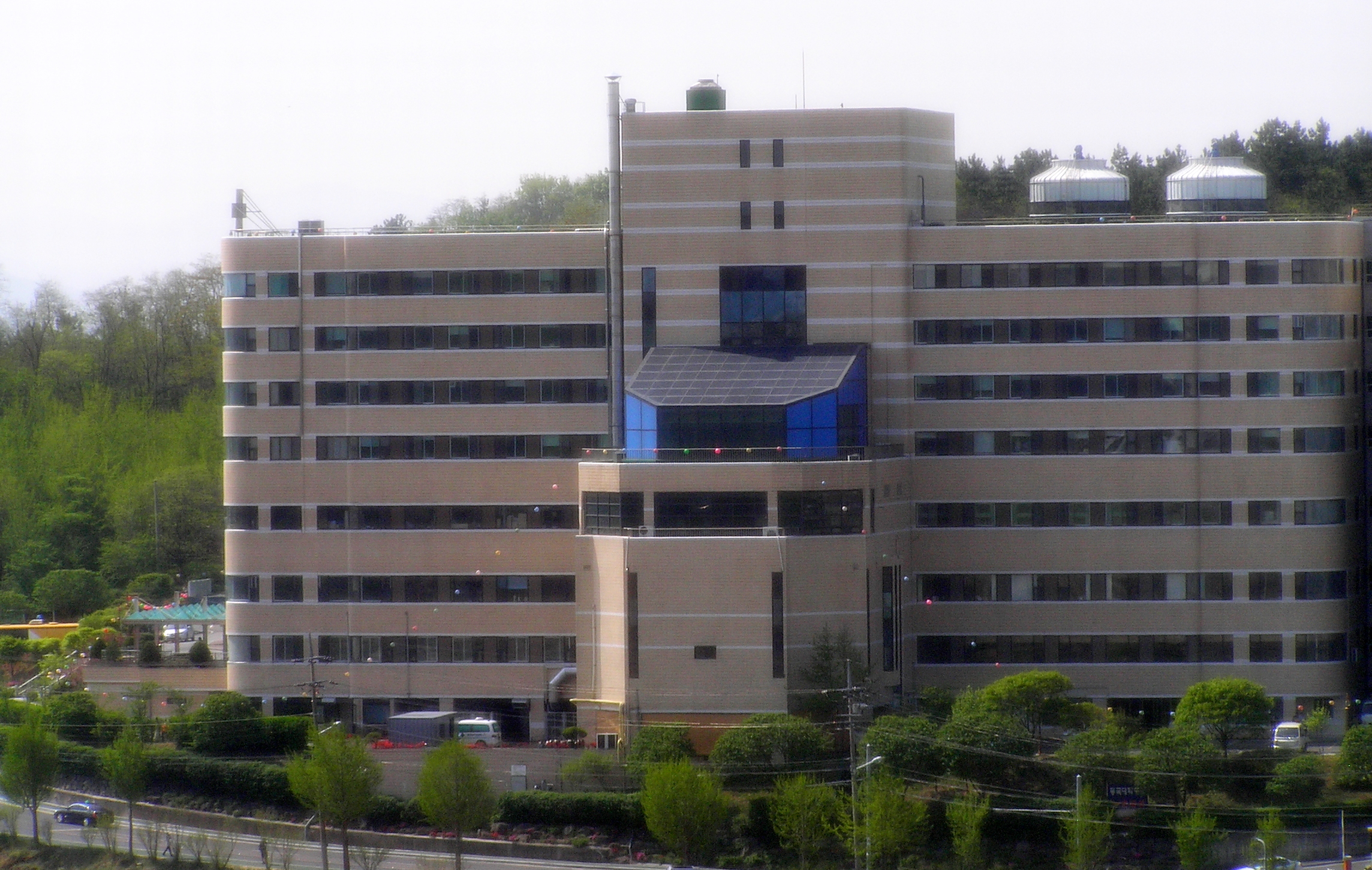
University Hospital

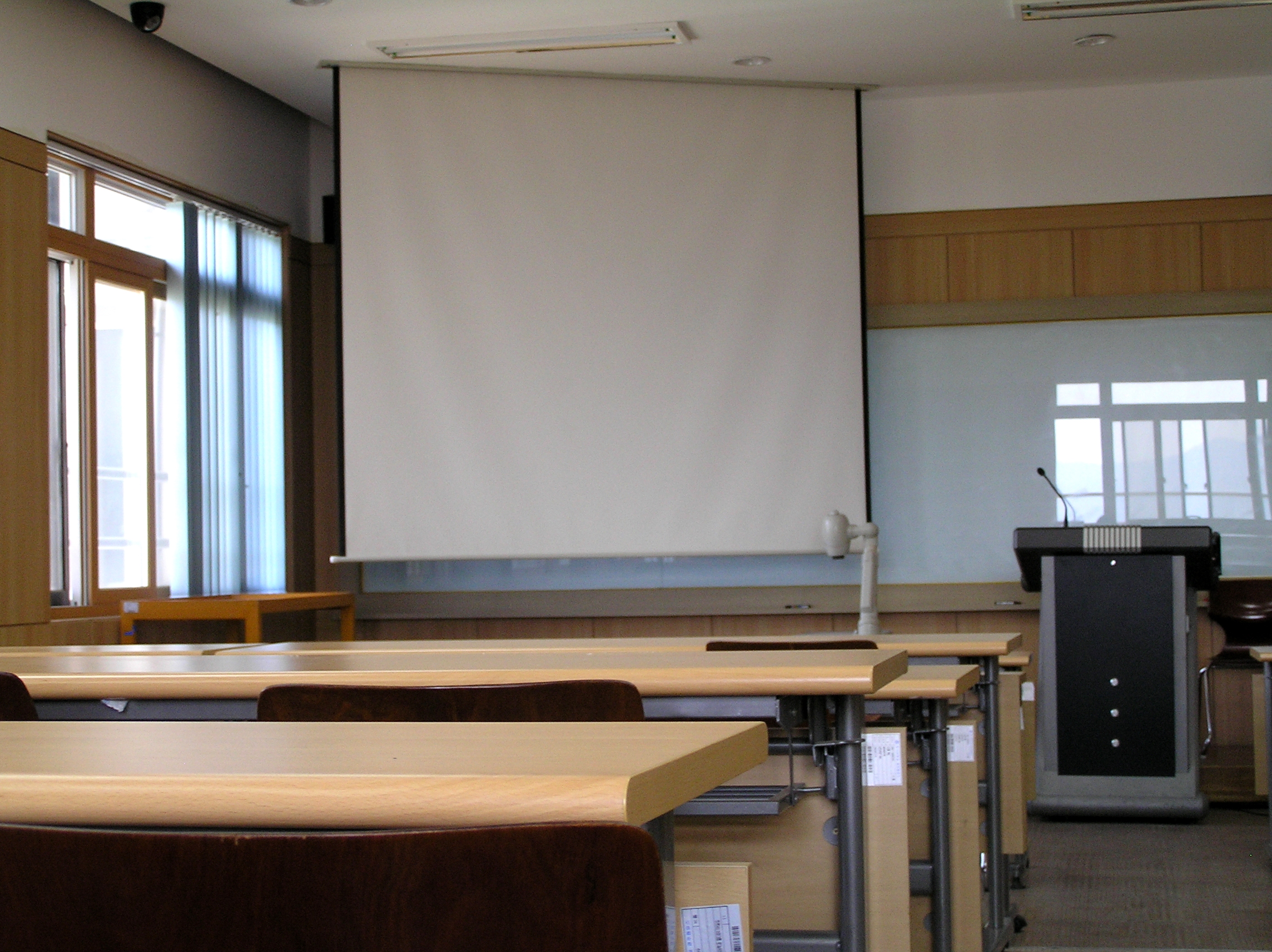
Auditorium

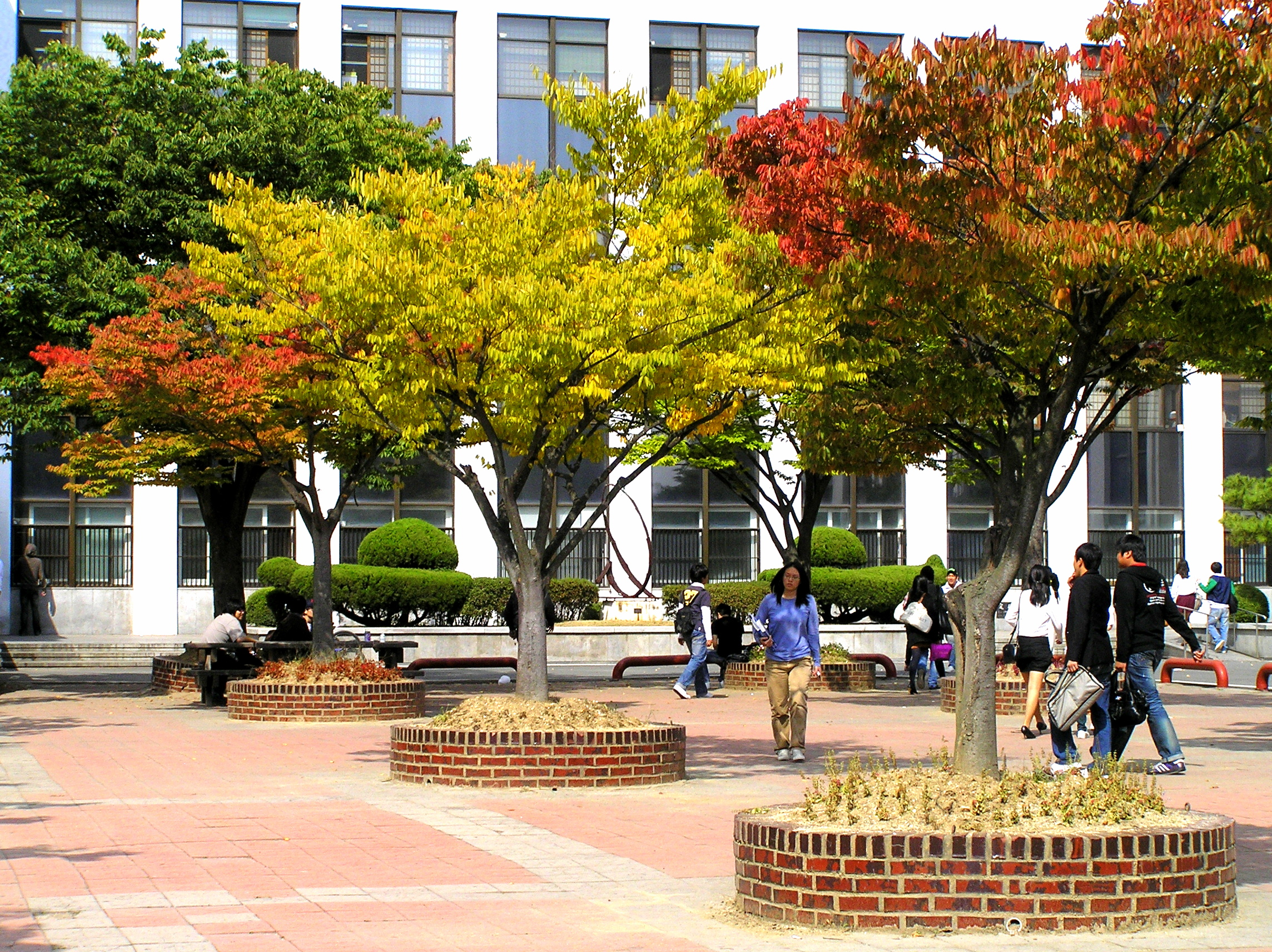
Students' square in front of the Humanities building

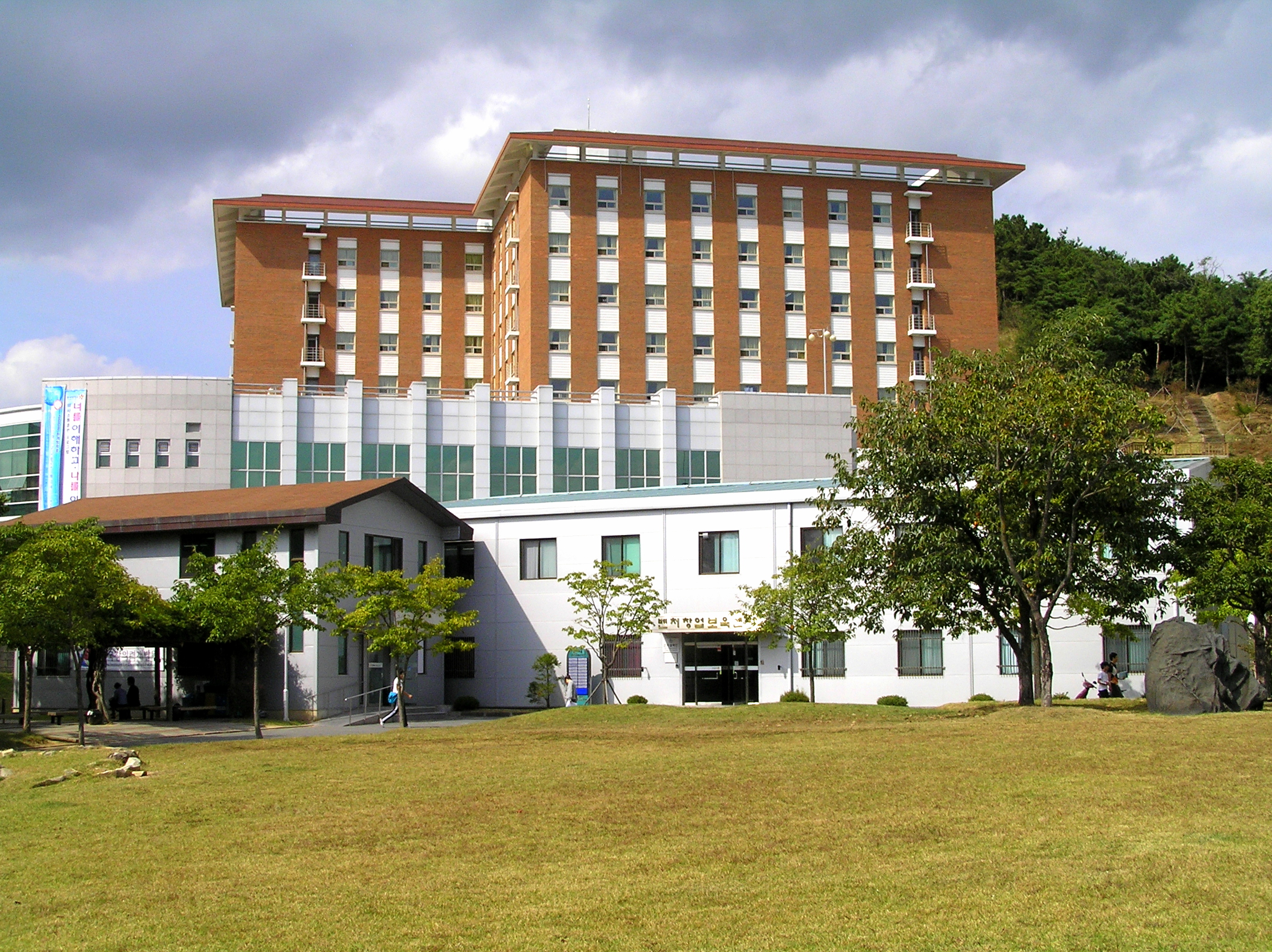
Dormitory

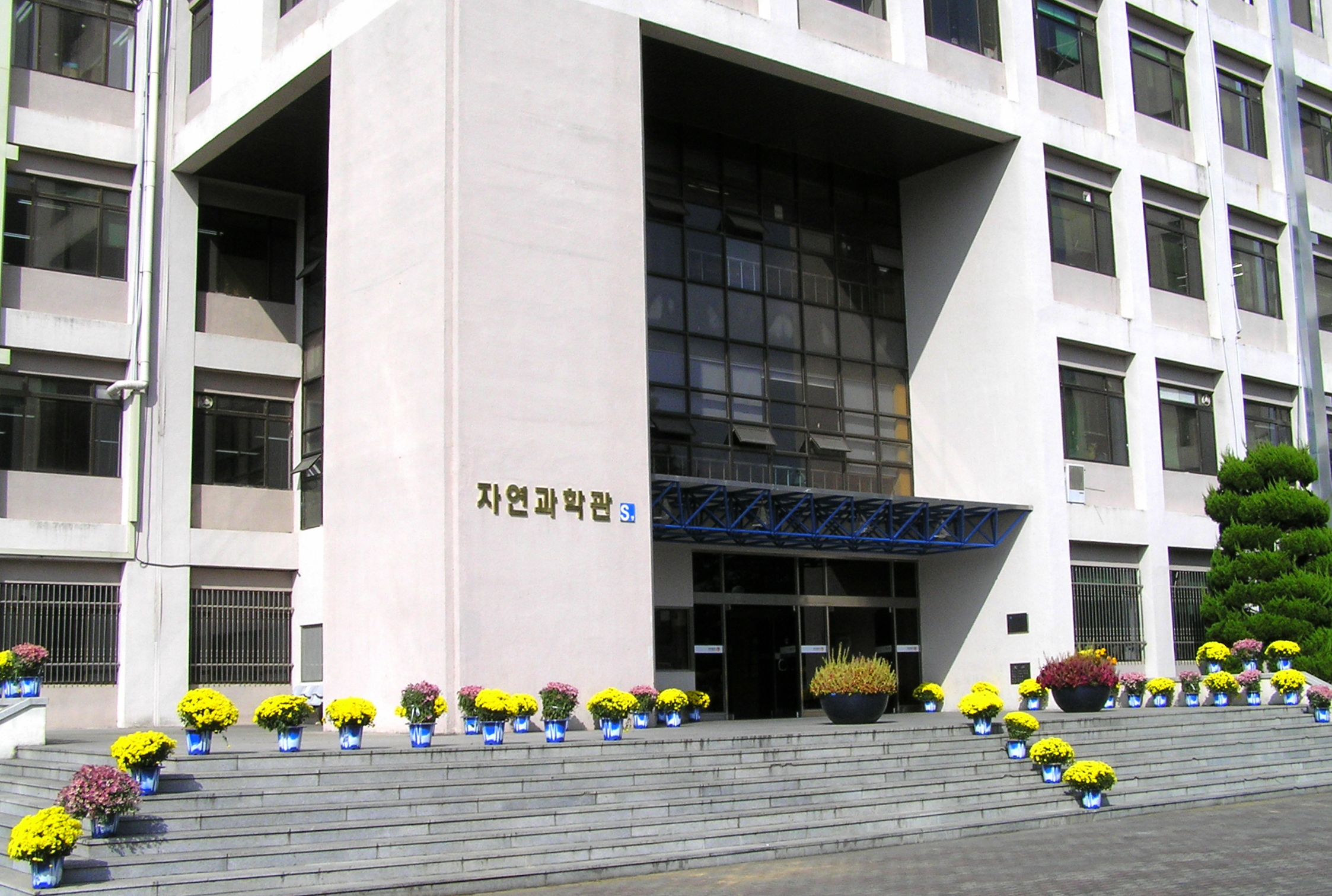
Natural Sciences Building

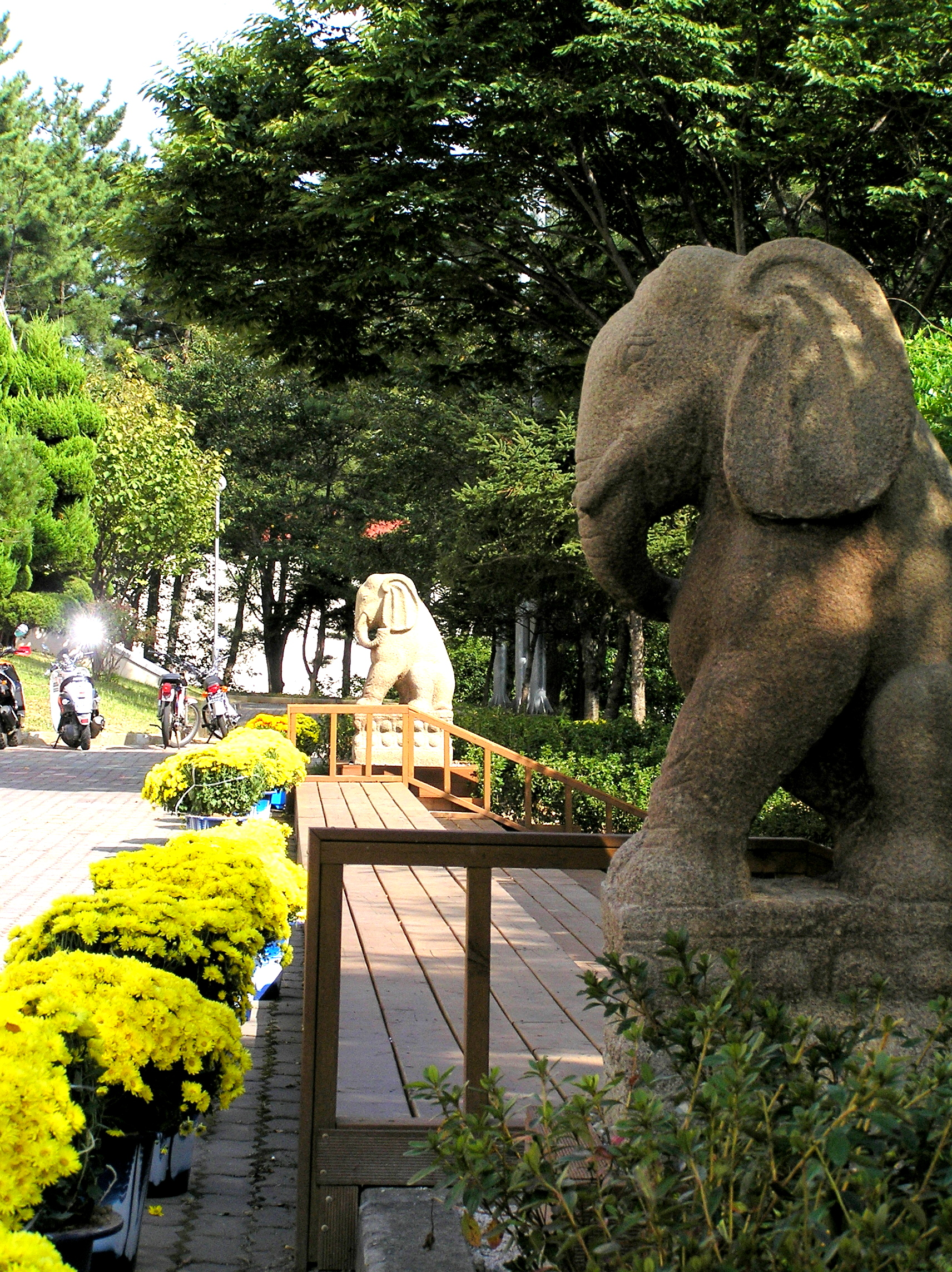
University Symbol statues on campus

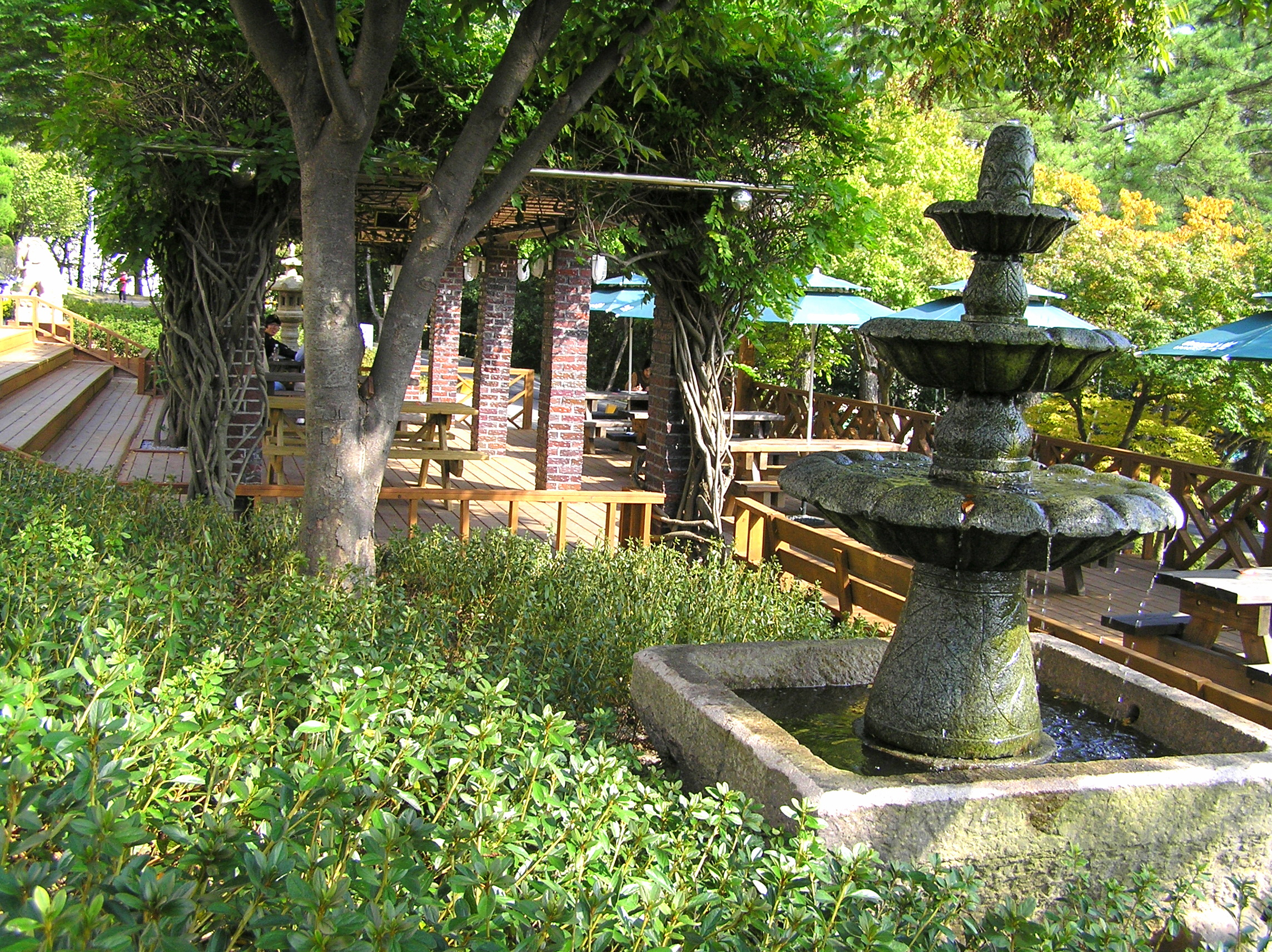
Student area

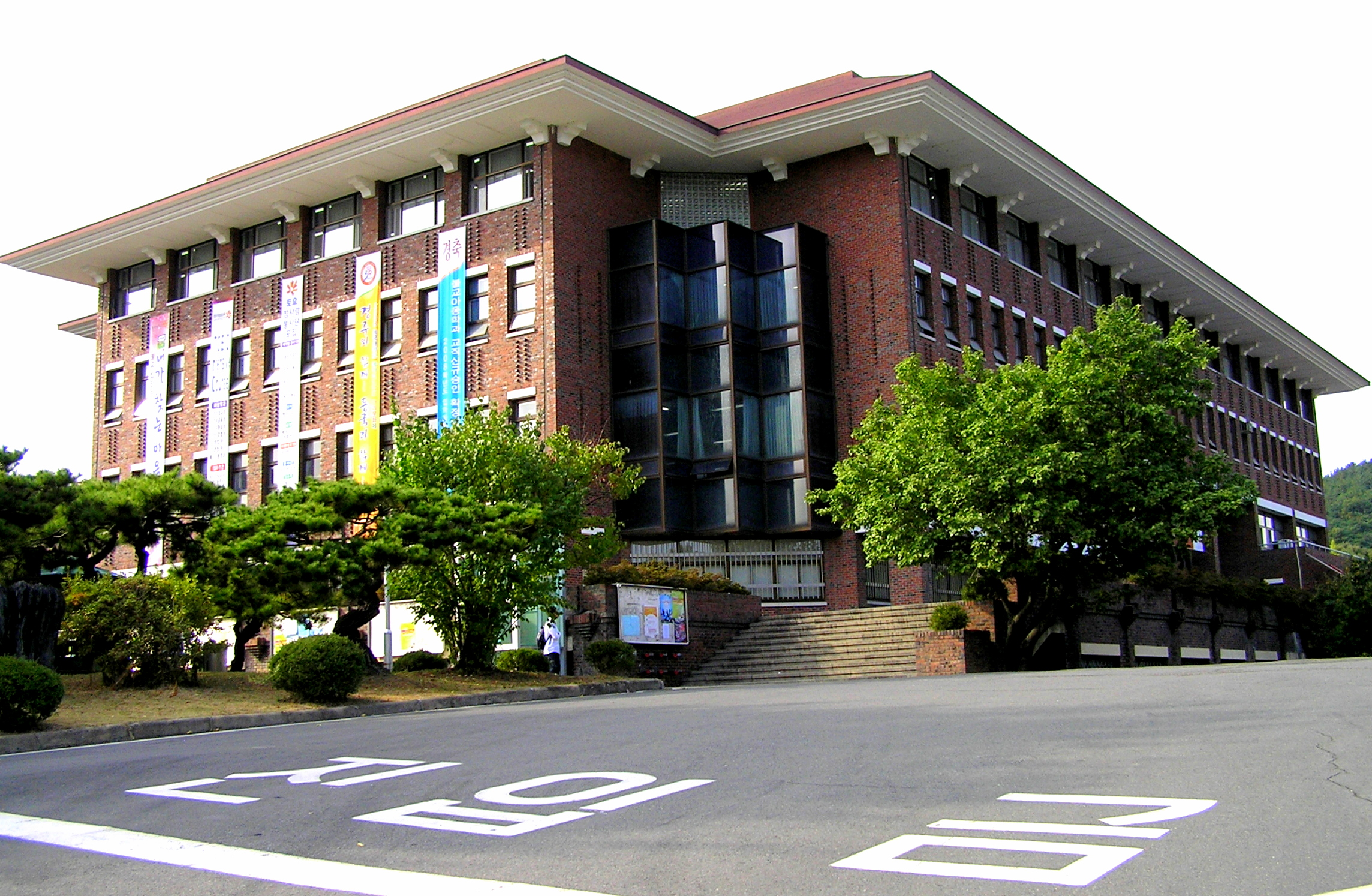
Library

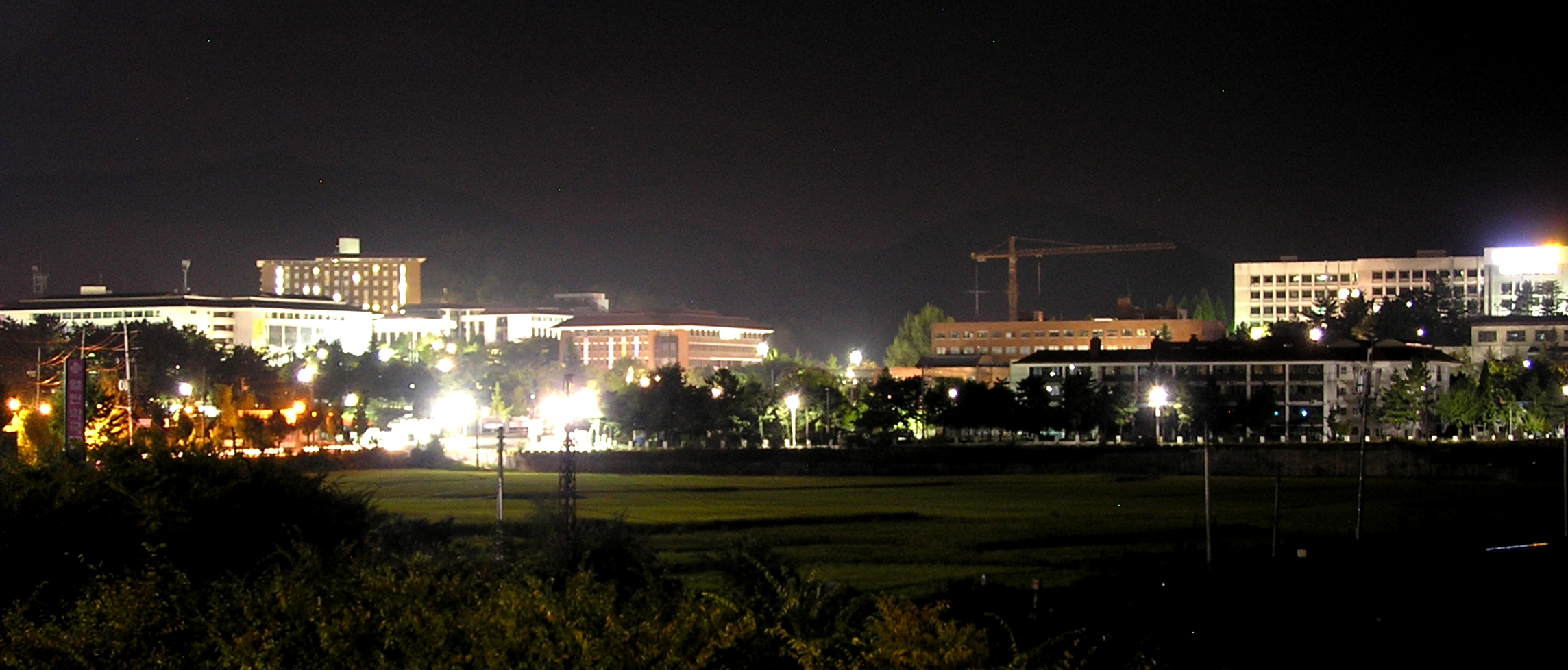
Campus at night

== See also ==
- List of colleges and universities in South Korea
- Education in South Korea
