= 2011 U-League =

Caffe Bene U-League
- Season: 2011
- Champions: Hongik University (1st title)
- Matches played: 597
- Goals scored: 2,132 (3.57 per match)
- Best Player: Shim Dong-woon
- Top goalscorer: Jeon Hyeon-chul (5 goals)

The 2011 U-League, officially known as 2011 Caffe Bene U-League, was the fourth football season of the U-League. The 69 participating universities were divided into 7 regional leagues, and the top 32 teams advanced to the "U-League Championship", the knockout stage of the U-League. The other 37 teams eliminated in the regional round also participated in the "U-League Friendship", another tournament made by Korea Football Association.

== Regional round ==
=== Capital Area Central League ===
Pos	Team	Pld	W	D	L	GF	GA	GD	Pts	Qualification
1	Chung-Ang University	16	11	2	3	34	19	+15	35	Advance to the Championship
2	Yonsei University	16	10	4	2	29	10	+19	34	Advance to the Championship
3	Ajou University	16	9	4	3	37	18	+19	31	Advance to the Championship
4	Tamna University	16	7	6	3	19	14	+5	27	Advance to the Championship
5	Hanzhung University (Note: Hanzhung University and Songho College were deducted 3 points.)	16	7	3	6	25	25	0	21	Advance to the playoff rounds
6	Songho College	16	4	7	5	22	22	0	16	Advance to the Friendship
7	Sejong University	16	3	4	9	18	32	–14	13	Advance to the Friendship
8	Digital Seoul Culture Arts University	16	2	3	11	13	35	–22	9	Advance to the Friendship
9	Youngdong University	16	1	3	12	16	38	–22	6	Advance to the Friendship

=== Capital Area Eastern League ===
Pos	Team	Pld	W	D	L	GF	GA	GD	Pts	Qualification
1	Korea University	18	14	2	2	41	15	+26	44	Advance to the Championship
2	Kwangwoon University	18	10	4	4	44	17	+27	34	Advance to the Championship
3	Kyung Hee University	18	10	4	4	31	22	+9	34	Advance to the Championship
4	Konkuk University	18	8	5	5	33	16	+17	29	Advance to the Championship
5	Myongji University	18	8	4	6	36	14	+22	28	Advance to the playoff rounds
6	Sangji University	18	5	7	6	21	21	0	22	Advance to the playoff rounds
7	Kyonggi University	18	6	3	9	25	28	–3	21	Advance to the Friendship
8	Halla University	18	6	2	10	26	34	–8	20	Advance to the Friendship
9	Chungbuk National University	18	5	4	9	20	33	–13	19	Advance to the Friendship
10	Seoul National University	18	0	1	17	3	80	–77	1	Advance to the Friendship

=== Capital Area Western League ===
Pos	Team	Pld	W	D	L	GF	GA	GD	Pts	Qualification
1	Sungkyunkwan University	18	9	5	4	29	18	+11	32	Advance to the Championship
2	Yong-In University	18	10	2	6	25	19	+6	32	Advance to the Championship
3	Dongguk University	18	10	1	7	40	33	+7	31	Advance to the Championship
4	Hanyang University	18	9	3	6	23	18	+5	30	Advance to the Championship
5	Hongik University	18	9	2	7	25	18	+7	29	Advance to the playoff rounds
6	Kwandong University	18	8	5	5	24	18	+6	29	Advance to the playoff rounds
7	University of Suwon	18	8	3	7	28	21	+7	27	Advance to the Friendship
8	University of Incheon	18	6	4	8	16	23	–7	22	Advance to the Friendship
9	Cheongju University	18	5	5	8	19	20	–1	20	Advance to the Friendship
10	Gukje Digital University	18	0	2	16	12	53	–41	2	Advance to the Friendship

=== Central League ===
Pos	Team	Pld	W	D	L	GF	GA	GD	Pts	Qualification
1	Hannam University	18	15	2	0	47	15	+32	48	Advance to the Championship
2	Yeungnam University	18	11	5	2	38	13	+25	38	Advance to the Championship
3	Dankook University	18	11	4	3	42	14	+28	37	Advance to the Championship
4	Sun Moon University	18	8	3	7	32	27	+5	27	Advance to the Championship
5	Hanmin University	18	7	4	7	41	33	+8	25	Advance to the playoff rounds
6	Sungmin University	18	7	4	7	29	32	–3	25	Advance to the playoff rounds
7	Daekyeung University	18	6	4	8	35	27	+8	22	Advance to the Friendship
8	Pai Chai University	18	6	1	11	23	28	–5	19	Advance to the Friendship
9	Gyeongju University	18	3	2	13	17	44	–27	11	Advance to the Friendship
10	Hoseo University	18	1	0	17	8	79	–71	3	Advance to the Friendship

=== Yeongnam League ===
Pos	Team	Pld	W	D	L	GF	GA	GD	Pts	Qualification
1	University of Ulsan	18	12	4	2	35	16	+19	40	Advance to the Championship
2	Dong-a University	18	11	5	2	33	12	+21	38	Advance to the Championship
3	Daegu University	18	11	3	4	32	15	+17	36	Advance to the Championship
4	Dong-Eui University	18	10	5	3	37	18	+19	35	Advance to the Championship
5	Kyungwoon University	18	7	4	7	24	26	–2	25	Advance to the playoff rounds
6	Pukyong National University	18	5	5	8	25	27	–2	20	Advance to the playoff rounds
7	Inje University	18	5	4	9	17	22	–5	19	Advance to the Friendship
8	Daegu Arts University	18	5	4	9	21	35	–14	19	Advance to the Friendship
9	Kundong University	18	4	5	9	17	25	–8	17	Advance to the Friendship
10	Andong Science College	18	0	1	17	5	50	–45	1	Advance to the Friendship

=== Honam League ===
Pos	Team	Pld	W	D	L	GF	GA	GD	Pts	Qualification
1	Jeonju University	18	12	4	2	40	8	+32	40	Advance to the Championship
2	Woosuk University	18	11	7	0	35	18	+17	40	Advance to the Championship
3	Gwangju University	18	8	7	3	36	20	+16	31	Advance to the Championship
4	Yewon Arts University	18	8	3	7	19	12	+7	27	Advance to the Championship
5	Seonam University	18	7	6	5	31	26	+5	27	Advance to the playoff rounds
6	Wonkwang University	18	5	7	6	17	25	–8	22	Advance to the playoff rounds
7	Nambu University	18	5	4	9	19	34	–15	19	Advance to the Friendship
8	Kunjang College	18	5	3	10	19	24	–5	18	Advance to the Friendship
9	Howon University	18	5	2	11	19	32	–13	17	Advance to the Friendship
10	Chosun College of Science & Technology	18	0	5	13	9	45	–36	5	Advance to the Friendship

=== Southern League ===
Pos	Team	Pld	W	D	L	GF	GA	GD	Pts	Qualification
1	Myungshin University	18	13	2	3	43	12	+31	41	Advance to the Championship
2	Honam University	18	12	4	2	51	15	+36	40	Advance to the Championship
3	Chosun University	18	12	2	4	39	21	+18	38	Advance to the Championship
4	Daebul University	18	11	3	4	49	24	+25	36	Advance to the Championship
5	Chodang University	18	10	5	3	42	21	+21	35	Advance to the playoff rounds
6	International University of Korea	18	7	2	9	43	37	+6	23	Advance to the playoff rounds
7	Chunnam Techno College	18	6	2	10	31	46	–15	20	Advance to the Friendship
8	Hanlyo University	18	5	0	13	29	41	–12	15	Advance to the Friendship
9	Dongkang College	18	4	0	14	17	45	–28	12	Advance to the Friendship
10	Sunghwa College	18	0	0	18	19	101	–82	0	Advance to the Friendship

== Playoff rounds ==
Four teams of the second playoff round qualified for the U-League Championship, and the other nine teams advanced to the U-League Friendship. Hanzhung University, Seonam University and Chodang University directly advanced to the second playoff round.

=== First playoff round ===
Hanmin University	0–4	Kwandong University	Gimcheon University Stadium
Myongji University	3–0	Sungmin University	Gimcheon University Stadium
Hongik University	4–1	International University of Korea	Gimcheon University Stadium
Kyungwoon University	2–3	Sangji University	Gimcheon KT&G Stadium
Pukyong National University	0–2	Wonkwang University	Gimcheon KT&G Stadium

=== Second playoff round ===
Chodang University	4–0	Kwandong University	Gimcheon Stadium Subground
Seonam University	0–1	Myongji University	Gimcheon Stadium Subground
Hanzhung University	2–3	Hongik University	Gimcheon University Stadium
Sangji University	3–1	Wonkwang University	Gimcheon University Stadium

== Friendship ==
The draw for the U-League Friendship was held on 4 October 2011. Hoseo University withdrew from the tournament.

=== First round ===
26 October 2011
Howon University	2–0	Seoul National University	Gimcheon KT&G Stadium
Cheongju University	3–0	Sunghwa College	Gimcheon University Ground
Dongkang College	2–2 (4–1 p)	Andong Science College	Gimcheon University Ground
Gukje Digital University	1–0	Chosun College of Science & Technology	Gimcheon University Ground

=== Round of 32 ===
28–29 October 2011
Hanmin University	3–2	Kundong University	Gimcheon KT&G Stadium
Kyungwoon University	0–1	Gyeongju University	Gimcheon University Ground
Sejong University	4–2	Hanlyo University	Gimcheon University Ground
Kwandong University	0–1	Howon University	Gimcheon University Ground
University of Suwon	1–1 (2–3 p)	Kunjang College	Gimcheon Stadium Subground
Seonam University	0–5	Cheongju University	Gimcheon Stadium Subground
Inje University	1–2	Pai Chai University	Gimcheon Stadium
Songho College	0–1	Chungbuk National University	Gimcheon Stadium
Sungmin University	1–0	Youngdong University	Gimcheon University Ground
Pukyong National University	0–1	University of Incheon	Gimcheon University Ground
Chunnam Techno College	4–2	Taekyeung College	Gimcheon University Ground
Hanzhung University	4–2	Dongkang College	Gimcheon University Ground
Kyonggi University	2–0	Digital Seoul Culture Arts University	Gimcheon Stadium
Wonkwang University	1–1 (1–3 p)	Gukje Digital University	Gimcheon Stadium Subground
International University of Korea	4–4 (3–5 p)	Halla University	Gimcheon Stadium Subground
Nambu University	1–0	Daegu Arts University	Gimcheon Stadium Subground

=== Round of 16 ===
30–31 October 2011
Hanmin University	5–2	Gyeongju University	Gimcheon Stadium Subground
Sejong University	3–1	Howon University	Gimcheon Stadium Subground
Kunjang College	1–5	Cheongju University	Gimcheon University Ground
Pai Chai University	2–0	Chungbuk National University	Gimcheon University Ground
Sungmin University	0–1	University of Incheon	Gimcheon Stadium Subground
Chunnam Techno College	2–1	Hanzhung University	Gimcheon Stadium Subground
Kyonggi University	0–1	Gukje Digital University	Gimcheon University Ground
Halla University	3–2	Nambu University	Gimcheon University Ground

=== Quarter-finals ===
2 November 2011
Hanmin University	0–1	Sejong University	Gimcheon Stadium
Cheongju University	5–0	Pai Chai University	Gimcheon Stadium
University of Incheon	2–1	Chunnam Techno College	Gimcheon Stadium Subground
Gukje Digital University	4–1	Halla University	Gimcheon Stadium Subground

=== Semi-finals ===
4 November 2011
Sejong University	1–6	Cheongju University	Gimcheon Stadium
University of Incheon	1–0	Gukje Digital University	Gimcheon Stadium

=== Final ===
6 November 2011
Cheongju University	2–1	University of Incheon	Gimcheon Stadium

== Championship ==
The draw for the U-League Championship was held on 4 October 2011.

=== Bracket ===
Round of 32
Hannam University	3
Chodang University	0
Yonsei University	3
Dong-Eui University	0
Korea University	2
Daebul University	1
Yeungnam University	1
Kyung Hee University	2
University of Ulsan (p)	0 (5)
Myongji University	0 (4)
Honam University	1
Yewon Arts University	2
Jeonju University	1
Hanyang University	0
Dankook University	1
Ajou University	5
Chung-Ang University	0
Hongik University	1
Kwangwoon University	2 (4)
Daegu University (p)	2 (5)
Sungkyunkwan University	3
Sun Moon University	1
Chosun University	0
Gwangju University	2
Myungshin University	0
Sangji University	1
Yong-In University	2
Konkuk University	1
Dong-a University	1
Tamna University	2
Woosuk University	2 (3)
Dongguk University (p)	2 (4)

Round of 16
Hannam University	1
Yonsei University	0
Korea University	3
Kyung Hee University	2
University of Ulsan	2
Yewon Arts University	1
Jeonju University	2
Ajou University	3
Hongik University (p)	0 (4)
Daegu University	0 (3)
Sungkyunkwan University	0 (1)
Gwangju University (p)	0 (3)
Sangji University	1
Yong-In University	4
Tamna University	0
Dongguk University	1

Quarter-finals
Hannam University	3
Korea University	2
University of Ulsan	2
Ajou University	1
Hongik University	2
Gwangju University	1
Yong-In University	1
Dongguk University	2

Semi-finals
29 October – Gimcheon
Hannam University	1
University of Ulsan	2
29 October – Gimcheon
Hongik University	1
Dongguk University	0

Final
11 November – Gimcheon
University of Ulsan	0
Hongik University	3

=== Round of 32 ===
22–23 October 2011
Hannam University	3–0	Chodang University	Gimcheon Stadium
Yonsei University	3–0	Dong-Eui University	Gimcheon Stadium
Korea University	2–1	Daebul University	Gimcheon Stadium
Yeungnam University	1–2	Kyung Hee University	Gimcheon Stadium
University of Ulsan	0–0 (5–4 p)	Myongji University	Gimcheon University Ground
Honam University	1–2	Yewon Arts University	Gimcheon University Ground
Jeonju University	1–0	Hanyang University	Gimcheon University Ground
Dankook University	1–5	Ajou University	Gimcheon University Ground
Chung-Ang University	0–1	Hongik University	Gimcheon Stadium
Kwangwoon University	2–2 (4–5 p)	Daegu University	Gimcheon Stadium
Sungkyunkwan University	3–1	Sun Moon University	Gimcheon Stadium Subground
Chosun University	0–2	Gwangju University	Gimcheon Stadium Subground
Myungshin University	0–1	Sangji University	Gimcheon University Ground
Yong-In University	2–1	Konkuk University	Gimcheon University Ground
Dong-a University	1–2	Tamna University	Gimcheon University Ground
Woosuk University	2–2 (3–4 p)	Dongguk University	Gimcheon University Ground

=== Round of 16 ===
24–25 October 2011
Hannam University	1–0	Yonsei University	Gimcheon Stadium Subground
Korea University	3–2	Kyung Hee University	Gimcheon Stadium Subground
University of Ulsan	2–1	Yewon Arts University	Gimcheon Stadium
Jeonju University	2–3	Ajou University	Gimcheon Stadium
Hongik University	0–0 (4–3 p)	Daegu University	Gimcheon Stadium Subground
Sungkyunkwan University	0–0 (1–3 p)	Gwangju University	Gimcheon Stadium Subground
Sangji University	1–4	Yong-In University	Gimcheon Stadium
Tamna University	0–1	Dongguk University	Gimcheon Stadium

=== Quarter-finals ===
27 October 2011
Hannam University	3–2	Korea University	Gimcheon Stadium Subground
University of Ulsan	2–1	Ajou University	Gimcheon Stadium Subground
Hongik University	2–1	Gwangju University	Gimcheon Stadium
Yong-In University	1–2	Dongguk University	Gimcheon Stadium

=== Semi-finals ===
29 October 2011
Hannam University	1–2	University of Ulsan	Gimcheon Stadium
Hongik University	1–0	Dongguk University	Gimcheon Stadium

=== Final ===
11 November 2011
University of Ulsan	0–3	Hongik University	University of Ulsan Ground

== See also ==
- 2011 in South Korean football
- 2011 Korean FA Cup
