= 2010 U-League =

olleh kt U-League
- Season: 2010
- Champions: Yonsei University (1st title)
- Matches played: 693
- Goals scored: 2,235 (3.23 per match)
- Best Player: Lee Won-gyu
- Top goalscorer: Knockout stage: Jung Sung-min (5 goals); Regional round: Lee Dong-geun (24 goals)
- Best goalkeeper: Park Chung-hyo

The 2010 U-League, officially known as 2010 olleh kt U-League, was the third football season of the U-League. The number of participating universities increased to 66. The participating teams were divided into 6 regional leagues, and the top 32 teams advanced to the knockout stage.

== Regional round ==
=== Capital Area League A ===
Pos	Team	Pld	W	D	L	GF	GA	GD	Pts
1	Yonsei University	22	17	3	2	40	9	+31	54
2	Ajou University	22	13	5	4	51	28	+23	44
3	Korea University	22	14	1	7	41	26	+15	43
4	Sangji University	22	11	7	4	39	22	+17	40
5	Kwandong University	22	12	3	7	44	26	+18	39
6	Yong-In University	22	10	7	5	37	22	+15	37
7	University of Incheon	22	11	3	8	43	32	+11	36
8	Sunmoon University	22	5	7	10	26	35	–9	22
9	Tamna University	22	5	3	14	25	43	–18	18
10	Chungbuk National University	22	4	6	12	20	42	–22	18
11	Gukje Digital University	22	2	7	13	16	40	–24	13
12	Seoul National University	22	1	2	19	8	65	–57	5

=== Capital Area League B ===
Pos	Team	Pld	W	D	L	GF	GA	GD	Pts
1	Konkuk University	20	16	3	1	49	7	+42	51
2	Cheongju University	20	12	4	4	35	13	+22	40
3	Hongik University	20	11	6	3	37	22	+15	39
4	Myongji University	20	9	9	2	29	25	+4	36
5	Hanyang University	20	10	4	6	44	20	+24	34
6	University of Suwon	20	8	6	6	32	29	+3	30
7	Songho College	20	8	2	10	27	26	+1	26
8	Hanzhung University	20	6	2	12	25	43	–18	20
9	Hanmin University	20	5	2	13	26	44	–18	17
10	Sungmin University	20	3	1	16	15	49	–34	10
11	Digital Seoul Culture Arts University	20	1	3	16	13	54	–41	6

=== Capital Area League C ===
Pos	Team	Pld	W	D	L	GF	GA	GD	Pts
1	Kwangwoon University	18	11	4	3	38	16	+22	37
2	Dongguk University	18	9	5	4	37	18	+19	32
3	Chung-Ang University	18	10	2	6	40	23	+17	32
4	Sungkyunkwan University	18	10	2	6	34	21	+13	32
5	Kyung Hee University	18	8	5	5	38	24	+14	29
6	Halla University	18	7	4	7	46	35	+11	25
7	Dankook University	18	7	4	7	38	31	+7	25
8	Kyonggi University	18	5	6	7	25	34	–9	21
9	Myungshin University	18	5	3	10	25	41	–16	18
10	Hoseo University	18	0	1	17	10	88	–78	1

=== Central League ===
Pos	Team	Pld	W	D	L	GF	GA	GD	Pts
1	Howon University	20	13	5	2	36	13	+23	44
2	Woosuk University	20	13	4	3	49	15	+34	43
3	Hannam University	20	13	3	4	40	22	+18	42
4	Jeonju University	20	11	2	7	34	18	+16	35
5	Pai Chai University	20	10	1	9	30	23	+7	31
6	Kyungwoon University	20	8	6	6	24	20	+4	30
7	Wonkwang University	20	7	4	9	19	19	0	25
8	Kundong University	20	7	4	9	19	30	–11	25
9	Daegu Arts University	20	7	1	12	23	35	–12	22
10	Andong Science College	20	3	4	13	19	38	–19	13
11	Youngdong University	20	1	0	19	9	69	–60	3

=== Yeongnam League ===
Pos	Team	Pld	W	D	L	GF	GA	GD	Pts
1	University of Ulsan	20	15	3	2	68	29	+39	48
2	Yeungnam University	20	13	5	2	46	17	+29	44
3	Daegu University	20	12	7	1	45	13	+32	43
4	Dong-Eui University	20	11	5	4	46	26	+20	38
5	Dong-a University	20	9	6	5	31	19	+12	33
6	Inje University	20	8	6	6	34	32	+2	30
7	Pukyong National University	19	6	3	10	25	37	–12	21
8	International University of Korea	19	4	4	11	26	39	–13	16
9	Gyeongju University	20	4	1	15	18	45	–27	13
10	Sorabol College	18	2	4	12	13	42	–29	10
11	Taekyeung College	20	2	0	18	19	72	–53	6

=== Honam League ===
Pos	Team	Pld	W	D	L	GF	GA	GD	Pts
1	Honam University	20	14	5	1	54	14	+40	47
2	Chodang University	20	11	7	2	51	21	+30	40
3	Daebul University	20	12	4	4	39	18	+21	40
4	Chosun University	20	10	9	1	46	24	+22	39
5	Gwangju University	20	11	3	6	45	23	+22	36
6	Seonam University	20	10	3	7	39	36	+3	33
7	Kunjang College	20	7	4	9	30	37	–7	25
8	Chosun College of Science & Technology	20	6	4	10	42	44	–2	22
9	Hanlyo University	20	3	4	13	22	38	–16	13
10	Chunnam Techno College	20	3	3	14	28	68	–40	12
11	Dongkang College	20	0	0	20	20	93	–73	0

=== Ranking of six-placed teams ===
The six-placed team in the Capital Area League A and the best team among the other four sixth-placed teams excluding the Capital Area League C club advanced to the knockout stage.

Pos	Grp	Team	Pld	W	D	L	GF	GA	GD	Pts
1	HN	Seonam University	20	10	3	7	39	36	+3	33
2	CT	Kyungwoon University	20	8	6	6	24	20	+4	30
3	CAB	University of Suwon	20	8	6	6	32	29	+3	30
4	YN	Inje University	20	8	6	6	34	32	+2	30

== Knockout stage ==
=== Bracket ===
The draw for the playoff was held on 4 October 2010.

Round of 32
Honam University (p)	1 (5)
Dong-a University	1 (4)
Ajou University	2 (4)
Gwangju University (p)	2 (5)
Konkuk University	1
Yong-In University	0
Hannam University	2
Chung-Ang University	1
Howon University	1
Kyung Hee University	3
Daegu University (p)	1 (5)
Chosun University	1 (4)
Woosuk University	1
Myongji University	2
Cheongju University	0
Sangji University	1
Kwangwoon University	4
Hanyang University	2
Dongguk University	2
Kwandong University	1
University of Ulsan	2
Seonam University	0
Hongik University	2
Daebul University	0
Yonsei University	3
Pai Chai University	1
Korea University	1
Sungkyunkwan University	3
Yeungnam University	3
Jeonju University	5
Chodang University	2
Dong-Eui University	1

Round of 16
Honam University	2
Gwangju University	0
Konkuk University	2
Hannam University	1
Kyung Hee University	3
Daegu University	2
Myongji University	0 (3)
Sangji University (p)	0 (5)
Kwangwoon University (p)	2 (4)
Dongguk University	2 (3)
University of Ulsan	1 (3)
Hongik University (p)	1 (5)
Yonsei University	2
Sungkyunkwan University	1
Jeonju University	1
Chodang University	2

Quarter-finals
Honam University	1
Konkuk University	0
Kyung Hee University	4
Sangji University	2
Kwangwoon University	2
Hongik University	1
Yonsei University	1
Chodang University	0

Semi-finals
31 October – Yongin
Honam University	0
Kyung Hee University	1
31 October – Yongin
Kwangwoon University	2
Yonsei University	4

Final
5 November – Yongin
Kyung Hee University	0
Yonsei University	1

=== Round of 32 ===
21 October 2010	Honam University	1–1 (a.e.t.) (5–4 p)	Dong-a University	Yongin Football Center Ground A1, Yongin
10:00 KST

21 October 2010	Ajou University	2–2 (a.e.t.) (4–5 p)	Gwangju University	Yongin Football Center Ground A1, Yongin
12:00 KST

21 October 2010	Konkuk University	1–0	Yong-In University	Yongin Football Center Ground A2, Yongin
12:00 KST

21 October 2010	Hannam University	2–1	Chung-Ang University	Yongin Football Center Ground A2, Yongin
14:00 KST

21 October 2010	Howon University	1–3	Kyung Hee University	Yongin Football Center Ground A3, Yongin
12:00 KST

21 October 2010	Daegu University	1–1 (a.e.t.) (5–4 p)	Chosun University	Yongin Football Center Ground A3, Yongin
14:00 KST

21 October 2010	Woosuk University	1–2	Myongji University	Yongin Football Center Ground A1, Yongin
14:00 KST

21 October 2010	Cheongju University	0–1	Sangji University	Yongin Football Center Ground G1, Yongin
14:00 KST

22 October 2010	Kwangwoon University	4–2	Hanyang University	Yongin Football Center Ground A1, Yongin
10:00 KST

22 October 2010	Dongguk University	2–1	Kwandong University	Yongin Football Center Ground A1, Yongin
12:00 KST

22 October 2010	University of Ulsan	2–0	Seonam University	Yongin Football Center Ground A2, Yongin
10:00 KST

22 October 2010	Hongik University	2–0	Daebul University	Yongin Football Center Ground A2, Yongin
12:00 KST

22 October 2010	Yonsei University	3–1	Pai Chai University	Yongin Football Center Ground A3, Yongin
10:00 KST

22 October 2010	Korea University	1–3	Sungkyunkwan University	Yongin Football Center Ground A3, Yongin
12:00 KST

22 October 2010	Yeungnam University	3–5	Jeonju University	Yongin Football Center Ground A1, Yongin
14:00 KST

22 October 2010	Chodang University	2–1	Dong-Eui University	Yongin Football Center Ground A2, Yongin
14:00 KST

=== Round of 16 ===
23 October 2010	Honam University	2–0	Gwangju University	Yongin Football Center Ground A1, Yongin
10:00 KST

23 October 2010	Konkuk University	2–1	Hannam University	Yongin Football Center Ground A1, Yongin
12:00 KST

23 October 2010	Kyung Hee University	3–2	Daegu University	Yongin Football Center Ground A1, Yongin
14:00 KST

23 October 2010	Myongji University	0–0 (a.e.t.) (3–5 p)	Sangji University	Yongin Football Center Ground G1, Yongin
13:00 KST

24 October 2010	Kwangwoon University	2–2 (a.e.t.) (4–3 p)	Dongguk University	Yongin Football Center Ground A1, Yongin
11:00 KST

24 October 2010	University of Ulsan	1–1 (a.e.t.) (3–5 p)	Hongik University	Yongin Football Center Ground A2, Yongin
11:00 KST

24 October 2010	Yonsei University	2–1	Sungkyunkwan University	Yongin Football Center Ground A1, Yongin
13:00 KST

24 October 2010	Jeonju University	1–2	Chodang University	Yongin Football Center Ground A2, Yongin
13:00 KST

=== Quarter-finals ===
29 October 2010	Honam University	1–0	Konkuk University	Yongin Football Center Ground A1, Yongin
11:00 KST

29 October 2010	Kyung Hee University	4–2	Sangji University	Yongin Football Center Ground A2, Yongin
11:00 KST

29 October 2010	Kwangwoon University	2–1	Hongik University	Yongin Football Center Ground A1, Yongin
13:00 KST

29 October 2010	Yonsei University	1–0	Chodang University	Yongin Football Center Ground A2, Yongin
13:00 KST

=== Semi-finals ===
31 October 2010	Honam University	0–1	Kyung Hee University	Yongin Football Center Ground G1, Yongin
13:00 KST

31 October 2010	Kwangwoon University	2–4	Yonsei University	Yongin Football Center Ground G2, Yongin
13:00 KST

=== Final ===
5 November 2010	Kyung Hee University	0–1	Yonsei University	Kyung Hee University Global Campus, Yongin
14:00 KST

== See also ==
- 2010 in South Korean football
- 2010 Korean FA Cup
