= 2012 U-League =

Caffe Bene U-League
- Season: 2012
- Champions: Yonsei University (2nd title)
- Best Player: Kim Do-hyuk
- Top goalscorer: Championship: Park Joon-hee (4 goals); Regional round: Jung Min-woo (18 goals)
- Best goalkeeper: Park Chung-hyo

The 2012 U-League was the fifth football season of the U-League. 72 participating universities were divided into eight regional leagues, and the top four teams of each group advanced to the U-League Championship.

== Regional round ==
=== Central League 1 ===
Pos	Team	Pld	W	D	L	GF	GA	GD	Pts	Qualification
1	Sungkyunkwan University	16	12	2	2	47	16	+31	38	Advance to the Championship
2	Dongguk University	16	11	3	2	44	16	+28	36	Advance to the Championship
3	Kwandong University	16	8	6	2	28	15	+13	30	Advance to the Championship
4	Sun Moon University	16	9	2	5	30	20	+10	29	Advance to the Championship
5	Pai Chai University	16	9	1	6	33	20	+13	28	
6	Hoseo University	16	5	0	11	13	32	–19	15	
7	Hanmin University	16	4	2	10	22	44	–22	14	
8	Jeju International University	16	4	1	11	22	39	–17	13	
9	Seoul National University	16	1	1	14	13	50	–37	4	

=== Central League 2 ===
Pos	Team	Pld	W	D	L	GF	GA	GD	Pts	Qualification
1	Konkuk University	16	11	2	3	41	14	+27	35	Advance to the Championship
2	Ajou University	16	10	5	1	33	12	+21	35	Advance to the Championship
3	Hongik University	16	9	2	5	27	18	+9	29	Advance to the Championship
4	University of Suwon	16	6	7	3	30	21	+9	25	Advance to the Championship
5	Chungbuk National University	16	7	2	7	22	23	–1	23	
6	Chung-Ang University	16	5	5	6	28	21	+7	20	
7	Sangji University	16	4	7	5	24	16	+8	19	
8	Digital Seoul Culture Arts University	16	2	3	11	12	41	–29	9	
9	Global Cyber University	16	1	1	14	5	56	–51	4	

=== Central League 3 ===
Pos	Team	Pld	W	D	L	GF	GA	GD	Pts	Qualification
1	Kwangwoon University	16	13	3	0	36	6	+30	42	Advance to the Championship
2	Yonsei University	16	10	4	2	36	10	+26	34	Advance to the Championship
3	Korea University	16	10	3	3	35	15	+20	33	Advance to the Championship
4	Hanyang University	16	8	5	3	26	15	+11	29	Advance to the Championship
5	Myongji University	16	6	2	8	18	26	–8	20	
6	Halla University	16	6	2	8	16	26	–10	20	
7	Gukje Digital University	16	3	0	13	20	33	–13	9	
8	Kyonggi University	16	2	3	11	12	29	–17	9	
9	Osan College	16	3	0	13	13	52	–39	9	

=== Central League 4 ===
Pos	Team	Pld	W	D	L	GF	GA	GD	Pts	Qualification
1	Soongsil University	16	11	3	2	33	9	+24	36	Advance to the Championship
2	Yong-In University	16	10	3	3	25	11	+14	33	Advance to the Championship
3	Kyung Hee University	16	9	3	4	28	20	+8	30	Advance to the Championship
4	Dankook University	16	8	3	5	26	18	+8	27	Advance to the Championship
5	Cheongju University	16	7	2	7	26	26	0	23	
6	Hannam University	16	5	6	5	18	16	+2	21	
7	Hanzhung University	16	3	5	8	14	25	–11	14	
8	Songho College	16	2	4	10	14	32	–18	10	
9	Sejong University	16	0	5	11	9	36	–27	5	

=== Honam League 1 ===
Pos	Team	Pld	W	D	L	GF	GA	GD	Pts	Qualification
1	Gwangju University	16	11	5	0	43	13	+30	38	Advance to the Championship
2	Woosuk University	16	11	4	1	32	8	+24	37	Advance to the Championship
3	Chosun University	16	9	4	3	37	13	+24	31	Advance to the Championship
4	Seonam University	16	9	2	5	28	22	+6	29	Advance to the Championship
5	Kunjang College	16	8	1	7	26	22	+4	25	
6	Howon University	16	7	2	7	21	17	+4	23	
7	Dongkang College	16	3	3	10	14	23	–9	12	
8	Mokpo Science College	16	1	2	13	10	53	–43	5	
9	Chunnam Techno College	16	1	1	14	6	46	–40	4	

=== Honam League 2 ===
Pos	Team	Pld	W	D	L	GF	GA	GD	Pts	Qualification
1	Honam University	16	13	1	2	46	19	+27	40	Advance to the Championship
2	Jeonju University	16	11	3	2	35	17	+18	36	Advance to the Championship
3	Daebul University	16	7	4	5	35	29	+6	25	Advance to the Championship
4	Chodang University	16	6	7	3	23	19	+4	25	Advance to the Championship
5	Dongshin University	16	7	3	6	21	17	+4	24	
6	Nambu University	16	4	6	6	21	22	–1	18	
7	Wonkwang University	16	4	4	8	13	20	–7	16	
8	Hanlyo University	16	3	2	11	17	41	–24	11	
9	Chosun College of Science & Technology	16	0	4	12	7	34	–27	4	

=== Yeongnam League 1 ===
Pos	Team	Pld	W	D	L	GF	GA	GD	Pts	Qualification
1	Dong-Eui University	16	14	2	0	45	4	+41	44	Advance to the Championship
2	Dong-a University	16	13	1	2	45	9	+36	40	Advance to the Championship
3	Daegu University	16	10	3	3	38	15	+23	33	Advance to the Championship
4	Inje University	16	7	3	6	25	22	+3	24	Advance to the Championship
5	Andong Science College	16	5	3	8	22	31	–9	18	
6	International University of Korea	16	4	5	7	29	30	–1	17	
7	Daekyeung University	16	5	2	9	18	33	–15	17	
8	Gyeongju University	16	1	5	10	20	42	–22	8	
9	Munkyung College	16	0	2	14	11	67	–56	2	

=== Yeongnam League 2 ===
Pos	Team	Pld	W	D	L	GF	GA	GD	Pts	Qualification
1	Yeungnam University	16	12	3	1	37	9	+28	39	Advance to the Championship
2	Yewon Arts University	16	10	3	3	39	17	+22	33	Advance to the Championship
3	University of Ulsan	16	10	2	4	35	14	+21	32	Advance to the Championship
4	Jeonju Kijeon College	16	6	5	5	17	16	+1	23	Advance to the Championship
5	Pukyong National University	16	5	7	4	27	23	+4	22	
6	Kyungwoon University	16	4	5	7	20	28	–8	17	
7	Daegu Arts University	16	3	4	9	14	25	–11	13	
8	Youngdong University	16	2	3	11	10	36	–26	9	
9	Kundong University	16	4	0	12	9	40	–31	12	Withdrawal (Note: Kundong University withdrew after eleventh match.)

== Championship ==
=== Group stage ===
The first and second group match was held on 26 and 28 October 2012 respectively.

Group 1	Pld	W	L	GF	GA	GD
Kwandong University	2	1	1	1	0	+1
Kwangwoon University (Note: Head-to-head result: Kwangwoon University 3–2 Dankook University.)	2	1	1	3	3	0
Dankook University	2	1	1	4	4	0
Woosuk University	2	1	1	1	2	–1

Team 1	Score	Team 2
Kwangwoon	3–2	Dankook
Woosuk	0–0 (4–2 p)	Kwandong
Kwandong	1–0	Kwangwoon
Dankook	2–1	Woosuk

Group 2	Pld	W	L	GF	GA	GD
Dongguk University	2	2	0	8	2	+6
Gwangju University	2	1	1	2	1	+1
Kyung Hee University	2	1	1	1	3	–2
University of Suwon	2	0	2	2	7	–5

Team 1	Score	Team 2
Gwangju	2–1	Suwon
Dongguk	3–1	Kyung Hee
Kyung Hee	0–0 (6–5 p)	Gwangju
Dongguk	5–1	Suwon

Group 3	Pld	W	L	GF	GA	GD
Chosun University	2	2	0	2	0	+2
Sungkyunkwan University	2	1	1	4	2	+2
Jeonju University	2	1	1	2	3	–1
Jeonju Kijeon College	2	0	2	0	3	–3

Team 1	Score	Team 2
Sungkyunkwan	2–0	Kijeon
Chosun	1–0	Jeonju
Jeonju	2–2 (5–4 p)	Sungkyunkwan
Chosun	1–0	Kijeon

Group 4	Pld	W	L	GF	GA	GD
Yeungnam University	2	2	0	4	1	+3
Yong-In University	2	2	0	3	0	+3
Daegu University	2	0	2	1	3	–2
Hanyang University	2	0	2	0	4	–4

Team 1	Score	Team 2
Yeungnam	2–0	Hanyang
Yong-In	1–0	Daegu
Yeungnam	2–1	Daegu
Yong-In	2–0	Hanyang

Group 5	Pld	W	L	GF	GA	GD
Hongik University	2	2	0	5	0	+5
Yewon Arts University (Note: Head-to-head result: Yewon Arts University 3–0 Dong-Eui University.)	2	1	1	3	2	+1
Dong-Eui University	2	1	1	4	3	+1
Chodang University	2	0	2	0	7	–7

Team 1	Score	Team 2
Dong-Eui	4–0	Chodang
Hongik	2–0	Yewon
Yewon	3–0	Dong-Eui
Hongik	3–0	Chodang

Group 6	Pld	W	L	GF	GA	GD
Yonsei University	2	2	0	6	1	+5
Konkuk University	2	2	0	5	1	+4
Seonam University	2	0	2	0	3	–3
Daebul University	2	0	2	2	8	–6

Team 1	Score	Team 2
Konkuk	2–0	Seonam
Yonsei	5–1	Daebul
Konkuk	3–1	Daebul
Yonsei	1–0	Seonam

Group 7	Pld	W	L	GF	GA	GD
Korea University	2	2	0	2	2	0
Honam University	2	1	1	4	1	+3
Dong-a University	2	1	1	3	2	+1
Inje University	2	0	2	0	4	–4

Team 1	Score	Team 2
Honam	4–0	Inje
Korea	2–2 (3–2 p)	Dong-a
Korea	0–0 (4–2 p)	Inje
Dong-a	1–0	Honam

Group 8	Pld	W	L	GF	GA	GD
Soongsil University	2	2	0	5	1	+4
University of Ulsan	2	1	1	3	3	0
Sun Moon University	2	1	1	3	5	–2
Ajou University	2	0	2	1	3	–2

Team 1	Score	Team 2
Soongsil	3–0	Sun Moon
Ulsan	1–0	Ajou
Soongsil	2–1	Ajou
Sun Moon	3–2	Ulsan

=== Knockout stage ===
Round of 16
Hongik University	0
Sungkyunkwan University	2
Soongsil University	1
Yeungnam University	2
Yonsei University	3
Kwangwoon University	1
Korea University	0
Gwangju University	4
Yong-In University	0
Honam University	1
Chosun University	0
Yewon Arts University	2
Kwandong University	0
University of Ulsan	1
Dongguk University	0
Konkuk University	2

Quarter-finals
Sungkyunkwan University	0 (1)
Yeungnam University	0 (3)
Yonsei University	1
Gwangju University	0
Honam University	1
Yewon Arts University	2
University of Ulsan	0
Konkuk University	1

Semi-finals
Yeungnam University	0
Yonsei University	3
Yewon Arts University	1
Konkuk University	2

Final
Yonsei University	1
Konkuk University	0

== See also ==
- 2012 in South Korean football
- 2012 Korean FA Cup
