= U-League (association football) =

Football competition in South Korea

Football at the U-League
- Organising bodies: Korea Football Association; Korea University Sport Federation
- Founded: 2008; 17 years ago
- Country: South Korea
- Divisions: U-League 1 U-League 2
- Number of clubs: 85 (2024)
- Domestic cup: Korean FA Cup (2008–2019)
- Current champions: Sun Moon University (2024)
- Most championships: Chung-Ang University; Dankook University; Korea University; Yonsei University; Sun Moon University; Yong In University (2 titles each)

Football at the U-League is an event of the U-League and a university football competition in South Korea. South Korean university football clubs were originally participating in the Korean National University Football League, founded by the Korea University Football Confederation in 1965, but the Korea Football Association created its new league competition for university clubs in 2008. The U-League was founded as a football league, but currently manages a variety of sports. It is not included in the South Korean football league system.

== Champions ==
=== Champions by season ===
Season	Champions	Runners-up	Clubs
2008	Kyung Hee University	Hanyang University	10
2009	Dankook University	Jeonju University	22
2010	Yonsei University	Kyung Hee University	66
2011	Hongik University	University of Ulsan	69
2012	Yonsei University	Konkuk University	72
2013	Yeungnam University	Hongik University	76
2014	Kwangwoon University	Dankook University	77
2015	Yong In University	Sungkyunkwan University	78
2016	Korea University	Songho College	78
2017	Korea University	Jeonju University	83
2018	Yong In University	Chung-Ang University	83
2019	Chung-Ang University	Sangji University	82
2020	Sun Moon University	Dongguk University	82
2021	Jeonju University	Dong-Eui University	82
2022	Dankook University	Gimcheon University	87
2023	Chung-Ang University	Soongsil University	83
2024	Sun Moon University	University of Ulsan	85
2025			

=== Performance by university ===
University	Winners	Runners-up
Dankook University	2 (2009, 2022)	1 (2014)
Chung-Ang University	2 (2019, 2023)	1 (2018)
Yonsei University	2 (2010, 2012)	—
Yong In University	2 (2015, 2018)	—
Korea University	2 (2016, 2017)	—
Sun Moon University	2 (2020, 2024)	—
Jeonju University	1 (2021)	2 (2009, 2017)
Kyung Hee University	1 (2008)	1 (2010)
Hongik University	1 (2011)	1 (2013)
Yeungnam University	1 (2013)	—
Kwangwoon University	1 (2014)	—
University of Ulsan	—	2 (2011, 2024)
Hanyang University	—	1 (2008)
Konkuk University	—	1 (2012)
Sungkyunkwan University	—	1 (2015)
Songho College	—	1 (2016)
Sangji University	—	1 (2019)
Dongguk University	—	1 (2020)
Dong-Eui University	—	1 (2021)
Gimcheon University	—	1 (2022)
Soongsil University	—	1 (2023)

== Current clubs ==
List of participating universities in the 2025 U-League 1 (first division) and the 2025 U-League 2 (second division).

U-League 1 Region 1	U-League 1 Region 2
Dongguk University; Yonsei University; Korea University; Chung-Ang University; Hongik University; Jeonju University; Sun Moon University; Cheongju University; Howon University	Dankook University; Gimcheon University; Hanyang University; Sangji University; Soongsil University; Sungkyunkwan University; Daegu University; Catholic Kwandong University; Jeju International University
U-League 1 Region 3	U-League 1 Region 4
Honam University; Chosun University; Gwangju University; Incheon National University; Kwangwoon University; Myongji University; Yong In University; Hanil University; Gangseo University	University of Ulsan; Andong Science College; Konkuk University; Dong-Eui University; Ajou University; Hannam University; Kyung Hee University; Pai Chai University; Yeungnam University
U-League 2 Region 5	U-League 2 Region 6
Korea Christian College; Seoul National University; Seojeong University; University of Suwon; Jangan University; Calvin University (South Korea); Gangwon Halla University; Saekyung University	Kyonggi University; Songho University; Seoul Digital University; Yeonsung University; Tongwon University; Cyber Hankuk University of Foreign Studies; Cheju Halla University; Kyungmin University
U-League 2 Region 7	U-League 2 Region 8
Inje University; Suseong University; Kaya University; Daeshin University; Uiduk University; Dongyang University; Daekyeung University; International University of Korea	Kyungil University; Gimhae University; Dong-a University; Daegu Arts University; Dongwon Institute of Science and Technology; Gumi University; Munkyung College
U-League 2 Region 9	U-League 2 Region 10
Wonkwang University; Sehan University; Shinsung University; Jungwon University; Jeonju Kijeon College; Gangdong University; Chungwoon University; Kunjang University College	Nambu University; Dongkang College; Dongshin University; Mokpo Science College; Woosuk University; Chunnam Techno University; Chosun College of Science & Technology; Chodang University

== See also ==
- R League
- South Korea national football B team
- U-League
