= 2018 Korean FA Cup =

2018 KEB Hana Bank FA Cup

Tournament details
- Country: South Korea
- Dates: 9 March – 8 December 2018
- Teams: 86

Final positions
- Champions: Daegu FC (1st title)
- Runners-up: Ulsan Hyundai
- AFC Champions League: Daegu FC

Tournament statistics
- Top goal scorer: Cesinha (5 goals)

Awards
- Best player: Cesinha

The 2018 Korean FA Cup, known as the 2018 KEB Hana Bank FA Cup, was the 23rd edition of the Korean FA Cup. Daegu FC qualified for the group stage of the 2019 AFC Champions League after becoming eventual champions.

== Qualifying rounds ==
The draw was held on 23 February 2018.

=== First round ===
9 March 2018	Catholic Kwandong University	2–1 (a.e.t.)	Cyber Hankuk University
15:00		Report

10 March 2018	SMC Engineering	2–1 (a.e.t.)	Busan FC
12:00		Report

10 March 2018	Siheung Citizen	9–0	Fuji Xerox Korea
14:00		Report

10 March 2018	Seoul United	6–2	Samsung Electronics
14:00		Report

10 March 2018	Ajou University	1–2 (a.e.t.)	Yeoju Sejong
14:00		Report

10 March 2018	Yong In University	7–1	Pyeongchang FC
14:00		Report

10 March 2018	FC Uijeongbu	1–3	Pukyong National University
14:00		Report

10 March 2018	Sangji University	0–2	Dongguk University
14:00		Report

10 March 2018	Woosuk University	0–1	Chungju Citizen
14:00		Report

10 March 2018	Paju Citizen	2–1	Kyung Hee University
15:00		Report

10 March 2018	Daejeon City Corporation	0–4	Daegu University
15:00		Report

10 March 2018	Dong-Eui University	7–1	SeAH Besteel
15:00		Report

10 March 2018	Jesus Hospital	6–2	Mokpo Christian Hospital
15:00		Report

10 March 2018	Buyeo FC	5–1	SL Lighting
15:00		Report

10 March 2018	Yeungnam University	2–0	Hanyang University
17:00		Report

11 March 2018	Jungwon University	2–0	Inje University
12:00		Report

11 March 2018	Goyang Citizen	0–3	Yangju Citizen
15:00		Report

=== Second round ===
14 March 2018	Korea University	3–1	Soongsil University
15:00		Report

14 March 2018	Gyeongju Citizen	2–0	Dankook University
15:00		Report

14 March 2018	Jeonju Citizen	1–0	Chosun University
15:00		Report

14 March 2018	Catholic Kwandong University	1–2	University of Ulsan
15:00		Report

15 March 2018	Jeonju University	2–2 (a.e.t.) (6–5 p)	Dongguk University
15:00		Report

17 March 2018	University of Suwon	0–0 (a.e.t.) (4–3 p)	Dong-Eui University
12:00		Report

17 March 2018	Jungnang Chorus Mustang	1–1 (a.e.t.) (4–2 p)	Icheon Citizen
13:00		Report

17 March 2018	Incheon National University	1–0	Daegu University
14:00		Report

17 March 2018	Yeoju Sejong	0–0 (a.e.t.) (5–4 p)	SMC Engineering
14:00		Report

17 March 2018	Cheongju FC	0–1	Siheung Citizen
14:00		Report

17 March 2018	Paju Citizen	3–0	Buyeo FC
15:00		Report

17 March 2018	Pyeongtaek Citizen	1–1 (a.e.t.) (4–3 p)	Yeungnam University
15:00		Report

17 March 2018	Gwangju University	0–1	Jungwon University
15:00		Report

17 March 2018	Seoul United	1–3	Pukyong National University
15:00		Report

17 March 2018	Jesus Hospital	2–8	Yong In University
15:00		Report

18 March 2018	Chungju Citizen	2–0	Konkuk University
14:00		Report

18 March 2018	Chuncheon FC	2–0	Yangju Citizen
15:00		Report

=== Third round ===
28 March 2018	Yangpyeong FC	2–1 (a.e.t.)	Siheung Citizen
14:00		Report

28 March 2018	University of Ulsan	1–3 (a.e.t.)	Gyeongju KHNP
14:00		Report

28 March 2018	Daejeon Korail	3–1	Gwangju FC
15:00		Report

28 March 2018	Chuncheon FC	3–2	Jeonju Citizen
15:00		Report

28 March 2018	Asan Mugunghwa	7–0	Yeoju Sejong
15:00		Report

28 March 2018	FC Anyang	2–1	Changwon City
19:00		Report

28 March 2018	Cheonan City	2–1	Jeonju University
19:00		Report

28 March 2018	Busan Transportation Corporation	4–0	Chungju Citizen
19:00		Report

28 March 2018	Mokpo City	3–1	Jungnang Chorus Mustang
19:00		Report

28 March 2018	Gangneung City	2–0 (a.e.t.)	Pukyong National University
19:00		Report

28 March 2018	Ansan Greeners	7–0	University of Suwon
19:00		Report

28 March 2018	Gimhae FC	0–0 (a.e.t.) (5–4 p)	Cheongju City
19:30		Report

28 March 2018	Suwon FC	4–0	Jungwon University
19:30		Report

28 March 2018	Seoul E-Land	0–0 (a.e.t.) (1–3 p)	Korea University
20:00		Report

28 March 2018	Seongnam FC	1–0	Daejeon Citizen
20:00		Report

31 March 2018	Gimpo Citizen	2–1 (a.e.t.)	Pyeongtaek Citizen
14:00		Report

31 March 2018	Hwaseong FC	2–3 (a.e.t.)	Yong In University
14:00		Report

31 March 2018	FC Pocheon	2–0	Incheon National University
15:00		Report

31 March 2018	Paju Citizen	0–1	Gyeongju Citizen
15:00		Report

4 April 2018	Busan IPark	2–1	Bucheon FC 1995
14:00		Report

== Final rounds ==
The draw for the round of 32 and round of 16 was held on 10 May 2018.

=== Bracket ===
Round of 32
Pohang Steelers	0
Jeonnam Dragons	1
Daejeon Korail	1
Chuncheon FC	2
Jeonbuk Hyundai Motors	3
Busan Transportation Corporation	1
Asan Mugunghwa (a.e.t.)	1
Ansan Greeners	0
Daegu FC	4
Yong In University	1
Sangju Sangmu (p)	2 (2)
Yangpyeong FC	2 (4)
Incheon United	2
FC Pocheon	0
FC Anyang	1
Mokpo City (a.e.t.)	2
Ulsan Hyundai	1
Suwon FC	0
Busan IPark (a.e.t.)	3
Gyeongju Citizen	2
Gangwon FC	1
Gimhae City	2
Seongnam FC	0
Gyeongju KHNP (a.e.t.)	1
Suwon Samsung Bluewings	6
Gimpo Citizen	1
Gangneung City	1
Cheonan City (a.e.t.)	2
FC Seoul (p)	0 (3)
Gyeongnam FC	0 (1)
Jeju United	4
Korea University	1

Round of 16
Jeonnam Dragons	2
Chuncheon FC	1
Jeonbuk Hyundai Motors	1
Asan Mugunghwa	2
Daegu FC	8
Yangpyeong FC	0
Incheon United	1
Mokpo City	2
Ulsan Hyundai	2
Busan IPark	0
Gimhae City	1
Gyeongju KHNP	0
Suwon Samsung Bluewings (a.e.t.)	4
Cheonan City	2
FC Seoul	1
Jeju United	2

Quarter-finals
Jeonnam Dragons (p)	1 (4)
Asan Mugunghwa	1 (2)
Daegu FC	2
Mokpo City	1
Ulsan Hyundai	2
Gimhae City	0
Suwon Samsung Bluewings (p)	2 (2)
Jeju United	2 (1)

Semi-finals
31 October – Gwangyang
Jeonnam Dragons	1
Daegu FC	2
31 October – Ulsan
Ulsan Hyundai	2
Suwon Samsung Bluewings	1

Final
5, 8 December
Daegu FC	2	3	5
Ulsan Hyundai	1	0	1

=== Round of 32 ===
25 July 2018	Busan Transportation Corporation	1–3	Jeonbuk Hyundai Motors	Busan Gudeok Stadium, Busan
17:00		Report

25 July 2018	Gyeongnam FC	0–0 (a.e.t.) (1–3 p)	FC Seoul	Changwon Football Center, Changwon
19:00		Report

25 July 2018	Chuncheon FC	2–1	Daejeon Korail	Chuncheon Songam Stadium, Chuncheon
19:00		Report

25 July 2018	Gangneung City	1–2 (a.e.t.)	Cheonan City	Gangneung Stadium, Gangneung
19:00		Report

25 July 2018	FC Anyang	1–2 (a.e.t.)	Mokpo City	Anyang Sports Complex, Anyang
19:00		Report

25 July 2018	Ansan Greeners	0–1 (a.e.t.)	Asan Mugunghwa	Ansan Wa~ Stadium, Ansan
19:00		Report

25 July 2018	Incheon United	2–0	FC Pocheon	Incheon Football Stadium, Incheon
19:30		Report

25 July 2018	Ulsan Hyundai	1–0	Suwon FC	Ulsan Munsu Football Stadium, Ulsan
19:30		Report

25 July 2018	Pohang Steelers	0–1	Jeonnam Dragons	Pohang Steel Yard, Pohang
19:30		Report

25 July 2018	Suwon Samsung Bluewings	6–1	Gimpo Citizen	Suwon World Cup Stadium, Suwon
19:30		Report

25 July 2018	Daegu FC	4–1	Yong In University	Daegu Stadium, Daegu
19:30		Report

25 July 2018	Sangju Sangmu	2–2 (a.e.t.) (2–4 p)	Yangpyeong FC	Sangju Civic Stadium, Sangju
19:30		Report

25 July 2018	Gimhae FC	2–1	Gangwon FC	Gimhae Stadium, Gimhae
19:30		Report

25 July 2018	Jeju United	4–1	Korea University	Jeju World Cup Stadium, Seogwipo
19:30		Report

25 July 2018	Busan IPark	3–2 (a.e.t.)	Gyeongju Citizen	Busan Gudeok Stadium, Busan
20:00		Report

25 July 2018	Seongnam FC	0–1 (a.e.t.)	Gyeongju KHNP	Tancheon Sports Complex, Seongnam
20:00		Report

=== Round of 16 ===
8 August 2018	Jeonnam Dragons	2–1	Chuncheon FC	Gwangyang Football Stadium, Gwangyang
19:00		Report

8 August 2018	Asan Mugunghwa	2–1	Jeonbuk Hyundai Motors	Yi Sun-sin Stadium, Asan
19:00		Report

8 August 2018	Busan IPark	0–2	Ulsan Hyundai	Busan Gudeok Stadium, Busan
19:00		Report

8 August 2018	Cheonan City	2–4 (a.e.t.)	Suwon Samsung Bluewings	Cheonan Football Center, Cheonan
19:00		Report

8 August 2018	Daegu FC	8–0	Yangpyeong FC	Daegu Stadium, Daegu
19:30		Report

8 August 2018	Incheon United	1–2	Mokpo City	Incheon Football Stadium, Incheon
19:30		Report

8 August 2018	Gimhae FC	1–0	Gyeongju KHNP	Gimhae Stadium, Gimhae
19:30		Report

8 August 2018	FC Seoul	1–2	Jeju United	Seoul World Cup Stadium, Seoul
19:30		Report

=== Quarter-finals ===
The draw for the quarter-finals was held on 20 September 2018.

3 October 2018	Jeonnam Dragons	1–1 (a.e.t.) (4–2 p)	Asan Mugunghwa	Gwangyang Football Stadium, Gwangyang
14:00	Kim Kyeong-min 24'	Report	Lee Myung-joo 60'	Attendance: 1,167; Referee: Park Byung-Jin
	Penalties
	Wanderson (penalty scored); Donachie (penalty scored); Jeon Ji-hyun (penalty scored); Shin Jin-ha (penalty scored)		Lim Chang-gyoon (penalty scored); Lee Myung-joo (penalty missed); Ko Moo-yeol (penalty scored); Kim Dong-jin (penalty missed)

3 October 2018	Mokpo City	1–2	Daegu FC	Mokpo International Football Center, Mokpo
14:00	Kim Sang-wook 54'	Report	Jeon Hyeon-chul 21'; Kim Dae-won 72'	Attendance: 4,988; Referee: Jung Dong-Sik

3 October 2018	Ulsan Hyundai	2–0	Gimhae FC	Ulsan Munsu Football Stadium, Ulsan
14:00	Júnior Negrão 63', 70'	Report		Attendance: 2,386; Referee: Seo Dong-Jin

17 October 2018	Suwon Samsung Bluewings	2–2 (a.e.t.) (2–1 p)	Jeju United	Suwon World Cup Stadium, Suwon
19:30	Damjanović 4'; Park Gi-dong 115'	Report	Kim Seong-ju 77'; Tiago Marques 120+1'	Attendance: 2,909; Referee: Kim Woo-sung
	Penalties
	Damjanović (penalty scored); Lee Ki-je (penalty missed); Park Hyung-jin (penalty missed); Yeom Ki-hun (penalty scored)		Kwon Soon-hyung (penalty missed); Tiago Marques (penalty missed); Kim Seong-ju (penalty missed); Cruz (penalty scored); Lee Chang-keun (penalty missed)

=== Semi-finals ===
The draw for the semi-finals was held on 18 October 2018.

31 October 2018	Jeonnam Dragons	1–2	Daegu FC	Gwangyang Football Stadium, Gwangyang
19:30	Lee Sang-heon 60'	Report	Edgar 11'; Kim Dae-won 13'	Attendance: 1,253

31 October 2018	Ulsan Hyundai	2–1	Suwon Samsung Bluewings	Ulsan Munsu Football Stadium, Ulsan
19:30	Windbichler 6'; Júnior Negrão 32'	Report	Lee Jong-sung 56'	Attendance: 2,425

=== Final ===
5 December 2018 First leg	Ulsan Hyundai	1–2	Daegu FC	Ulsan Munsu Football Stadium, Ulsan
19:30 UTC+9	Hwang Il-su 50'	Report	Cesinha 51'; Edgar 88'	Attendance: 12,702; Referee: Lee Dong-jun

8 December 2018 Second leg	Daegu FC	3–0 (5–1 agg.)	Ulsan Hyundai	Daegu Stadium, Daegu
13:30 UTC+9	Kim Dae-won 59'; Cesinha 76'; Edgar 88'	Report		Attendance: 18,351; Referee: Ko Hyung-jin

== See also ==
- 2018 in South Korean football
- 2018 K League 1
- 2018 K League 2
- 2018 Korea National League
- 2018 K3 League Advanced
- 2018 K3 League Basic
