= Doyne Dawson =

James Doyne Dawson (born 27 November 1941 in Cape Girardeau, Missouri) is an American historian and former US Army officer. As of 2002 and 2010, he was Professor of International Affairs at Sejong University, Seoul, Korea, where he taught in the Asian Studies Program.

Dawson graduated from the University of Minnesota in 1963 and received a PhD in ancient history from Princeton University in 1974. He then trained at West Point to become a US Army officer.

He has written about group selection and warfare, and also about theological history.

He taught at Reed College, where he was an assistant professor; Boston University; Massachusetts Institute of Technology; High Point University; and Chosun University from 1998 to 2001.

== Books ==
- Dawson, Doyne (1992). Cities of the Gods: Communist Utopias in Greek Thought. Oxford University Press. ISBN 0195069838.
- Dawson, Doyne (1996). The Origins of Western Warfare. Westview Press. ISBN 081332940X.
- Dawson, Doyne (2001). The first armies. Cassell. ISBN 0304352888.
