= Yeongdong =

Yeongdong may refer to:

- Yeongdong (region), a region of eastern Gangwon, Korea
- Yeongdong County, a county in North Chungcheong, South Korea
- Yeongdong station, a Gyeongbu Line railway station in Yeongdong County
- Yeongdong, a historical name meaning "east of Yeongdeungpo", referring to the modern-day Gangnam region of Seoul
  - Yeongdong Bridge, one of the bridges over the Han River

== See also ==
- Youngdong University in Yeongdong County
