= Yumi Heo =

Korean American author and picture book illustrator (1964–2016)

- Education: Sangji University; New York School of Visual Arts
- Occupation: Author/Illustrator
- Spouse: Steven Dana
- Writing career
- Years active: 1994-2012
- Genre: Children's picture books
- Notable work: The Green Frogs: A Korean Folktale

Yumi Heo (1964–2016) was an author and illustrator of children's picture books. She was a graduate of San Ji University and the New York School of Visual Arts. In 1989, Heo moved to New York and earned an MFA in Illustration at the New York School of Visual Arts.

== Biography ==
=== Early life ===
Yumi Heo was born in Korea in 1964. Heo began taking art lessons in junior high with the encouragement of her mother.

=== "Q is for Queens" art installation ===
In 1999, Heo designed an art installation called "Q is for Queens." The installation features 30 stained glass windows featuring the landmarks and people of the Queens borough.

== Selected works ==
=== Writings ===
- 1994, One Afternoon
- 1995, Father’s Rubber Shoes
- 1996, The Green Frogs: A Korean Folktale
- 1999, One Sunday Morning
- 2009, Ten Days and Nine Nights: An Adoption Story
- 2012, Lady Hahn and Her Seven Friends
- 2015, Red Light, Green Light

=== Illustrator ===
- 1994, The Rabbit’s Judgement (Suzanne Crowder Han, author)
- 1995, The Rabbit’s Escape (Suzanne Crowder Han, author)
- 1996, The Lonely Lioness and the Ostrich Chicks: A Masai Tale (Verna Aardema, author)
- 1997, A is for Asia (Cynthia Chin-Lee, author)
- 1998, Pets! (Melrose Cooper, author)
- 1998, So Say the Little Monkeys (Nancy Van Laan, author)
- 1999, The Not So Itsy-Bitsy Spider: A Pop-up Book
- 2000, Yoshi’s Feast (Kimiko Kamikawa, author), an International Reading Association Teacher's Choice book
- 2001, Henry’s First-Moon Birthday (Lenore Look, author), a YASLA notable book
- 2001, Sometimes I’m Bombaloo (Rachel Vai), author)
- 2002, The Snake’s Tales (Marguerite W. Davol, author)
- 2003, Pirican Pic and Pirican Mor (Hugh Lupton, author)
- 2004, Smile, Lily! (Candace Fleming, author)
- 2004, Moondog (Alice Hoffman and Wolfe Martin, authors)
- 2004, Uncle Peter’s Amazing Chinese Wedding (Lenore Look, author)
- 2005, Tangerines and Tea, My Grandparents and Me (Ona Gritz, author)
- 2008, Jibberwillies at Night (Rachel Vail, author)
- 2008, Hey Mr. Choo-choo, Where Are You Going? (Susan Wickberg, author)
- 2011, Pola Dot Penguin Pottery (Lenore Look, author)
- 2012, Flabbersmashed about You (Rachel Vail, author)

=== Anthology Contributor ===
- 2002, This Place I Know: Poems of Comfort (Georgia Head, editor)
- 2007, Knock, Knock!
