= Sunghwa College =

- Hangul: 성화대학
- Hanja: 成和大學
- RR: Seonghwa daehak
- MR: Sŏnghwa taehak

Sunghwa College was a college located in Gangjin, South Korea. It was shut down by the Korean government in 2011 following "serious corruption and irregularities".
