= Jeon Hyeon-chul =

South Korean footballer

Personal information
- Full name: Jeon Hyeon-chul
- Date of birth: 3 July 1990 (age 36)
- Place of birth: South Korea
- Height: 1.74 m (5 ft 8 1/2 in)
- Position: Forward

Team information
- Current team: Daegu FC
- Number: 7

Youth career
- Ajou University

Senior career*
Years	Team	Apps	(Gls)
2012	Seongnam Ilhwa Chunma	22	(3)
2013–2015	Jeonnam Dragons	71	(9)
2016–2017	Busan IPark	19	(0)
2017–	Daegu FC	26	(2)
- * Club domestic league appearances and goals as of 7 December 2019

Jeon Hyeon-chul (Korean: 전현철; born 3 July 1990) is a South Korean footballer who plays as a forward for Daegu FC.

== Club career statistics ==
As of 17 July 2017

Club performance			League		Cup		Intercontinental		Total	
Season	Club	League	Apps	Goals	Apps	Goals	Apps	Goals	Apps	Goals
2012	Seongnam FC	K League 1	22	3	0	0	0	0	22	3
2013	Jeonnam Dragons	K League 1	30	6	0	0	–	–	30	6
2014	Jeonnam Dragons	K League 1	21	2	0	0	–	–	21	2
2015	Jeonnam Dragons	K League 1	20	1	2	2	–	–	22	3
2016	Busan IPark	K League 2	8	0	1	0	–	–	9	0
2017	Busan IPark	K League 2	11	0	2	1	–	–	13	1
Career total			112	12	5	3	0	0	117	15
