= Yewon Arts University =

Coordinates: 35.64715°N 127.27051°E

- Hangul: 예원예술대학교
- Hanja: 藝苑藝術大學校
- RR: Yewon yesul daehakgyo
- MR: Yewŏn yesul taehakkyo

Yewon Arts University is a private university located in Imsil County, North Jeolla province, South Korea. Undergraduate courses of study include painting, jewelry design, cultural product design, visual imaging, animation, music, dance, comedy, and cultural property preservation, as well as e-business and leisure studies. Campus facilities include a library and broadcasting facility. The dormitory is located in neighboring Jeonju City.

== Notable people ==
- Kim Shin-young, comedienne

== See also ==
- List of colleges and universities in South Korea
- Education in South Korea
