= Gimcheon University =

University located in Gimcheon, South Korea

Coordinates: 36.1399°N 128.0818°E

Korean name
- Hangul: 김천대학교
- Hanja: 金泉大學校
- RR: Gimcheon daehakgyo
- MR: Kimch'ŏn taehakkyo

Gimcheon University (Korean: 김천대학교) is a university located in Gimcheon, South Korea.

== History ==
- 1978 Founded as "Gimcheon Business Junior College" by the Shincheon Board of Directors.
- 1998 Name changed to "Gimcheon College"
- 2000 Selected as "The Best College of Health Science(A+)" by the MOE&HRD and Korean Council for College Education.
- 2001 Designed as a "Business Incubation Supporting Institution" by the Small & Medium Business Administration
- 2002 Selected as an "Excellent Technology Supporting Institution" at the Inno-Tech Show by the Small & Medium Business Administration.
- 2003 Kang, Sung Ae took office as the third president.
- 2004 Selected as "The Best Group in Percentage of Employment"
- 2005 Selected for consortium of "Industry-College Cooperation" by the Small & Medium Business Administration.
- 2006 Designated an "Excellent College" at the National Local Innovation Show.
- 2007 Recognized by the Ministry of Education, Science and Technology to change its charter from college to university. Established the "International Language Education Center".
- 2008 Selected as "The Best Group (Group A) in percentage of employment" by the Korean Educational Development Institute.
- 2009 Received its charter as a university from the Ministry of Education, Science and Technology.
- 2010 Held first matriculation ceremony as Gimcheon University
- 2024 Due to the recent worsening financial difficulties, Kang Sung-ae, the former chairman of the board of directors of Gimcheon University, sold the management rights to Ock Soo Park of the Good News Mission.

== International relationships ==
- Curtin University of Technology (AU) 1999
- The University of Newcastle (AU) 1999
- Hawaii Pacific University (US) 2000
- Yamano College of Aesthetics (JP) 2001
- Christchurch Polytechnic Institute of Technology (NZ) 2002
- The College of Marjon (UK) 2003
- Southwestern University (PH) 2005
- Cambridge College of Heilongjjang University (CN) 2005
- Biola University (US) 2005
- Qingdao Binhai University (CN) 2005
- Tashkent state Pedagogical University named after Nizami (UZ) 2007
- Tashkent State Institute of Oriental Studies (UZ) 2007
- Buryat State University (RU) 2007
- Vladivostok State University of Economics and Service (RU) 2007
- Taiyuan Tourism College (CN) 2008
- Kake Educational Institution (JP) 2008
- Liaoning University (CN) 2008
- Yeditepe University (TR) 2008
- Nanguo Business College (CN) 2008
- Chengdu University (CN) 2008
- Shandong College of Tourism & Hospitality (CN) 2008
- College of New Caledonia (CA) 2009
- Technical Technology Ulanngom College (MN) 2009
- Bataan Peninsula State University (PH) 2009
- Buntain Theological College (IN) 2009
- Loh Guan Lye Specialists Centre (MY) 2009
- Kathmandu University (NP) 2009
- Orkhon University (MN) 2010
- Baku State University (AZ) 2010
- Nakhchivan State University (AZ) 2010
- Southern College of Technology (TH) 2011
- Udomsuksa School (TH) 2011
- Arabaev Kyrgyz State University (KG) 2011
- California State University San Marcos (US) 2011
- Yichun University (CN) 2011
- Bloomfield College (US) 2011
