= Myungshin University =

- Hangul: 명신대학교
- Hanja: 明信大學校
- RR: Myeongsin daehakgyo
- MR: Myŏngsin taehakkyo

Myungshin University (Korean: 명신대학교) was a university located in Suncheon, Jeollanam-do, South Korea. It was shut down by the Korean government in 2011 following "serious corruption and irregularities"
