= Gukje Cyber University =

University in Suwon, South Korea

- Hangul: 국제사이버대학교
- Hanja: 國際사이버大學校
- RR: Gukje saibeo daehakgyo
- MR: Kukche saibŏ taehakkyo

Gukje Cyber University (Korean: 국제사이버대학교) is a private university located in Paldal-gu, Suwon, Gyeonggi-do, South Korea.

== Notable people ==
- Han Jisung, record producer, song-writer, vocalist and rapper of K-pop boy-group Stray Kids
- Seo Chang-bin, record producer, song-writer and rapper of K-pop boy-group Stray Kids
- Choi Whee-sung, R&B singer, record producer, and musical theatre actor
- Kang Dae-sung, actor and vocalist of K-pop boy-group BigBang
- Kang Seung-yoon, singer-songwriter, dancer, record producer, actor, and leader and vocalist of K-pop boy group Winner
- Kwon Ji-yong (G-Dragon), singer-songwriter, rapper, record producer, entrepreneur and fashion icon, and leader of K-pop boy group BigBang
- Cho Mi-yeon, singer, actress, model, TV host and vocalist of girl group (G)I-dle
- Lee Seunghyun (Seungri), soloist, song-writer and lead vocalist, former maknae and member of boy band BigBang
- Lee Min-ho (Lee Know), main dancer, singer of the K-pop boy group Stray Kıds
