= Hanmin University =

1959–2014 university in South Korea

Coordinates: 36.19539°N 127.23180°E

- Hangul: 한민대학교
- Hanja: 韓民大學校
- RR: Hanmin daehakgyo
- MR: Hanmin taehakkyo

Hanmin University (Korean: 한민대학교) was a university in Yeonsan, South Korea. In 2013 now-Ministry of Education granted its voluntary closure upon its request following the Ministry's audit report in 2012 which found its serious corruption and fraud. It officially closed in 2014.
