= Hanzhong University =

Private university in Donghae, South Korea from 1992 to 2018

Coordinates: 37.5044°N 129.0877°E

- Type: Private
- Active: 1992–2018
- Location: Donghae, Gangwon Province, South Korea
- Website: http://www.hanzhong.ac.kr/

- Hanzhong University
- Hangul: 한중대학교
- Hanja: 韓中大學校
- RR: Hanjung daehakgyo
- MR: Hanjung taehakkyo

Hanzhong University was a private university in South Korea. The campus was located in the city of Donghae, Gangwon province. In 2018 Ministry of Education ordered closure of the university due to its significant finance troubles and corruption of the founders and leadership after the special audit conducted following the lowest evaluation the university received in 2015.

== Academics ==
The university's undergraduate offerings are divided among four colleges: Humanities and Social Sciences, Arts and Athletics, Nursing, and Engineering. Graduate training is offered through schools of Education, Management Information, and Business, as well as the general graduate school, which offers instruction in civil engineering and international business.

== History ==
The university began in 1992 as Donghae Technical College (Korean: 동해전문대학교). It became a four-year institution, Donghae University (Korean: 동해대학교), in 1999. In 2005, name was changed to Hanzhong University.

== Rating ==
In 2015, an evaluation by the Ministry of Education rated the university in the lowest E group, resulting in the Ministry halting its monetary support and barring the University from all state-funded programs.

== Sister schools ==
International ties exist with the University of Illinois and University of Michigan in America, and with several Chinese institutions: Heilongjiang College, Chengdong University of Traditional Chinese Medicine, Henan University of Finance and Economics, and Dandong Normal Senior School.

== See also ==
- List of colleges and universities in South Korea
- Education in South Korea
