= Hanlyo University =

University in Gwangyang, South Korea

Coordinates: 34°57′23″N 127°33′54″E

- Type: Private
- Active: 1995–2022
- Location: Gwangyang, South Jeolla, South Korea
- Website: www.hanlyo.ac.kr

- Hanlyo University
- Hangul: 한려대학교
- Hanja: 漢麗大學校
- RR: Hallyeo daehakgyo
- MR: Hallyŏ taehakkyo

Hanlyo University (Korean: 한려대학교) is a university located in Gwangyang, South Korea. It was established in 1995.
