= SinGyeongju University =

University in Gyeongju, South Korea

- Motto: 진리, 정의, 믿음, 봉사 (Truth, Justice, Faith, Service)
- Type: Private
- Established: January 21, 1981; 45 years ago
- President: Kim Il-yun
- Location: Gyeongju, North Gyeongsang, South Korea; 35°49′47″N 129°09′43″E
- Campus: Urban
- Website: www.gju.ac.kr

Korean name
- Hangul: 신경주대학교
- Hanja: 新慶州大學校
- RR: Singyeongju daehakgyo
- MR: Sin'gyŏngju taehakkyo
- Location within South Korea

SinGyeongju University (Korean: 신경주대학교) is a private 4-year university located in Gyeongju, South Korea. It was previously called Gyeongju University and originally Korea Tourism University.

== History ==
Established in 1988 as Korea Tourism University, it originally consisted of five departments: the Department of Tourism Business Administration, the Department of Tourism and Public Administration, the Department of Tourism Development, the Department of Cultural Assets and The Department of English and Tourism. The university expanded in later years to include several other departments, as well as a graduate school (founded in 1995). In 1993, the university changed its name to its current one.

In September 2013, the university was one of thirty-five private colleges and universities that were cut off from all government aid and prohibited from participating in any federally funded research. The cuts were done at least in part as a response to the fast-approaching sharp decline in college-age students. The schools designated were those constituting the lowest scoring schools based on an eight-factor evaluation.

== Academics ==
Although tourism remains a major focus of the university, SinGyeongju University has also made efforts to develop and promote programs in high-tech fields such as information technology and computer science. In addition, the school's continuing education center gives local residents the opportunity to further their education in various fields. Like most universities in Korea, the academic year begins in February–June (1st Semester) and ends in September to December (2nd Term), with a summer and winter vacation between semesters.

== Campus life ==
The campus of SinGyeongju University is situated on the slopes of Seondosan in the western outskirts of Gyeongju. Although many of the students commute to and from the school from their homes in surrounding areas, the opening of a student dormitory in 2004 gave students the chance to live on campus. The university holds two festivals yearly for the students and members of the community: a school festival, typically held in the spring, and a sports festival held in the autumn.

== Undergraduate colleges ==
- School of Tourism Studies
- School of Foreign Languages and Tourism
- School of Law and Public Administration
- School of Construction & Environment System Engineering
- School of Business Administration & Advertising
- School of Computer & Information Science
- Department of Cultural Assets
- Department of Creative Writing
- Department of Community Sports and Recreation
- Department of Visual Arts

== Graduate colleges ==
- Department of Tourism Business Administration
- Department of Tourism Development
- Department of Cultural Assets
- Department of Environmental Landscale Architecture
- Department of Hotel Administration
- Department of Local Government
- Department of Business Management
