= Kundong University =

Technical college in Andong City, South Korea

- 건동대학교
- Type: Private
- Active: 1992–2012
- Academic staff: 132
- Undergraduates: 1,332
- Location: Andong, North Gyeongsang, South Korea
- Website: http://www.kundong.ac.kr/

- Kundong University
- Hangul: 건동대학교
- RR: Geondong daehakgyo
- MR: Kŏndong taehakkyo

Kundong University, sometimes called Andong Info Tech or AIT, was a small technical college located in Andong City, North Gyeongsang province, South Korea. In July 2012 now-Ministry of Education granted voluntary closure of the university upon the request filed in May 2012. The university officially closed in August 2012.

It offered degree programs in fields such architecture, animation, herbal medicine, and civil engineering. Facilities included broadcast studios and a library of around 18,500 volumes. International sister institutions included the Canadian Malaspina University-College and the American University of Montana and Wenatchee Valley College.

== History ==
The foundation which would establish the school was founded in 1972. In 1987, governmental permission to found a school was received, and in 1992 the school actually opened as Andong Industrial Technical College. The first entering class of 480 students was admitted on March 4, 1993. The entering class of 2003 numbered 842 students. The school took on its current name in 1998. From 2006, the name was Kundong University. The university closed in August, 2012

== See also ==
- List of colleges and universities in South Korea
- Education in South Korea
