= Howon University =

University in Gunsan, South Korea

Coordinates: 36.9663°N 126.8648°E

- 호원대학교
- Former names: Gunsan Industrial College (1977-1992); Jeonbuk Industrial College (1992-1998); Howon University (1998-present)
- Type: Private
- Established: 1977
- Academic staff: 607
- Students: 6,186 (2024)
- Location: Gunsan,, North Jeolla Province, South Korea
- Website: http://www.howon.ac.kr/english/

- Howon University
- Hangul: 호원대학교
- Hanja: 湖原大學校
- RR: Howon daehakgyo
- MR: Howŏn taehakkyo

Howon University (Korean: 호원대학교) is a private four-year comprehensive university located in Gunsan, South Korea. It is renowned for its high employment rate for its graduates.

== History ==
Established in 1977 as Gunsan Industrial College, it was elevated to a university in 1998.

For two consecutive years in 2009 and 2010, Howon University received a government funding amounting to US$5.4 million, as it was selected as a participant by the Ministry of Education for Korea's Educational Capability Improvement Project.

In 2013, the Ministry of Education of Korea certified Howon as the university with the highest recent graduates' employment rate in the whole country. In 2014, Howon placed second.

== Organization ==
There are six faculties and nine research institutes in Howon.

Colleges	Research Institutes
College of Social Science; College of Tourism; College of Media and Arts; College of Health and Welfare; College of Physical Education; College of Science and Engineering	Industrial Technology Lab; Urban & Environment Lab; Architectural Science & Technology Lab; Research Lab for Saemangum Tourism; Industrial Management Research Lab; Cultural & Social Science Research Lab; Free Legal Counselling Center; Automobile Industry Lab; Howon Textile & Fashion Research Lab

== Notable people ==
- Baek A-yeon, singer
- Cha Hak-yeon (N), singer (VIXX)
- Jung Taek Woon (Leo), singer (VIXX)
- Kim Won-shik (Ravi), rapper (VIXX)
- Hwang Chan-sung, singer (2PM)
- Jang Wooyoung, singer (2PM)
- Lim Hyun-sik, singer (BtoB)
- Lee Chang-sub, singer (BtoB)
- Lee Jun-ho, singer (2PM)
- Park Jin-young, singer (GOT7)
- Jeong Se-woon, singer
- Kim Jae-hwan, singer (Wanna One)
- Raina, singer (After School, Orange Caramel)
- Son Seung-yeon, singer
- Bae Sung-yeon, singer (PRISTIN)
