= Dongkang College =

Technical college in Gwangju, South Korea

- Hangul: 동강대학교
- Hanja: 東岡大學校
- RR: Donggang daehakgyo
- MR: Tonggang taehakkyo

Dongkang College (Korean: 동강대학교) is a private technical college in Buk District, Gwangju, South Korea. The current president is Kim Kyong Taek (김경택). About 110 instructors are employed.

== Academics ==
The college offers technical training in the fields of technology, humanities, social science, home economics, and education.

== History ==
The school was founded by Lee Weon Myo (이원묘) as Kwangju Dongshin Vocational School (동신실업전문학교). It opened its doors in 1976, with a student body of 320. The school became a junior college in 1979. The name Dongkang College was adopted in 1998.

== Sister schools ==
The college has entered into international exchange relations with institutions in Taiwan (Damsui Technical and Commercial Junior College) and the United States (Washburn State University and Dongguk Royal University).

== See also ==
- List of colleges and universities in South Korea
- Education in South Korea
