= Wonkwang University =

University in Iksan, South Korea

- 원광대학교
- Motto: 지덕겸수 · 도의실천
- Motto in English: Cultivation of Both Knowledge and Morality, Practice of Moral Principle
- Established: January 29, 1953
- Religious affiliation: Won Buddhism
- President: Park Seong-tae
- Location: Iksan, North Jeolla, South Korea; 35.969°N 126.957°E
- Campus: 64.4 hectares (159 acres)
- Mascot: Asi
- Website: www.wku.ac.kr

Korean name
- Hangul: 원광대학교
- Hanja: 圓光大學校
- RR: Wongwang daehakgyo
- MR: Wŏn'gwang taehakkyo

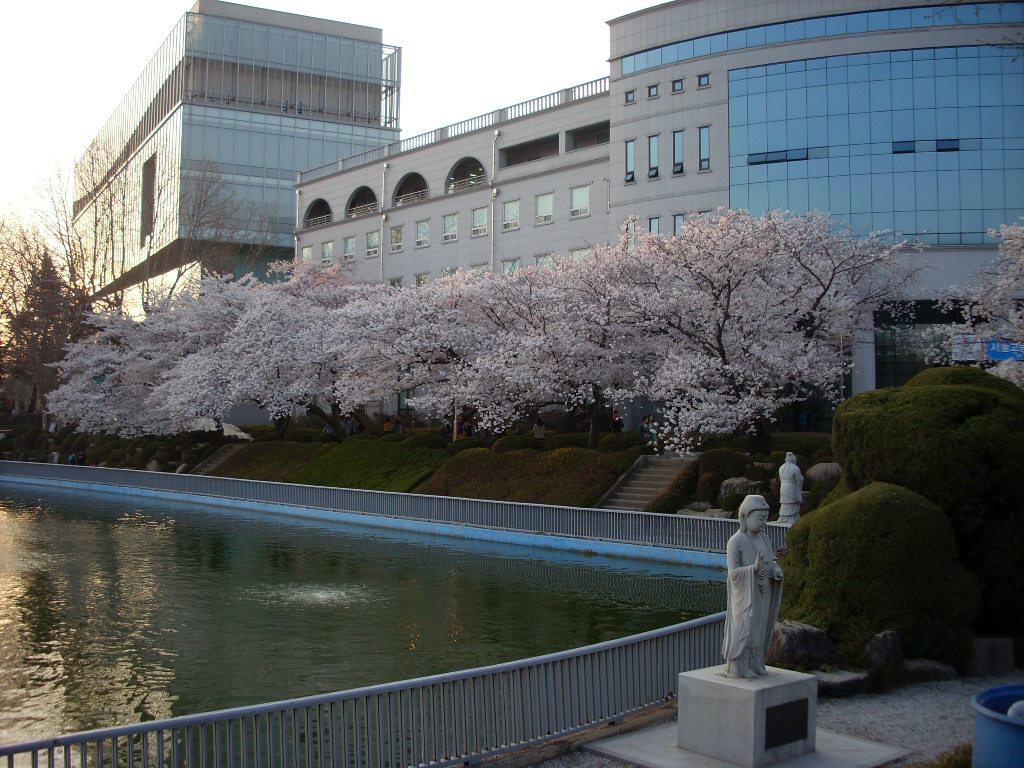
View from an artificial pond called Sudeokho (수덕호). University Library (left) and Law School (right).

Wonkwang University arboretum

Wonkwang University (Korean: 원광대학교) is a university located in Iksan, South Korea. Founded as Youilhakrim (Korean: 유일학림) in 1946, it is one of the few academies affiliated with Won Buddhism. Yuilhakrim was succeeded by Wonkwang Junior College (Korean: 원광초급대학) on 5 November 1951, and gained college status on 29 January 1953. The Postgraduate School was opened in 1967, and in 1971 it gained university status.

The university is known for its diverse medical courses: western medicine, dentistry, Korean medicine and pharmacy. Beside medical courses, the school is well known for its specialised courses such as police administration, fire service administration, and law school.

Wonkwang University is one of only two schools in South Korea that have courses for antiques restoration.

== Alumni ==
- Ha Tae-kwon, badminton player
- Hwang Sun-ho, badminton player
- Kim Dong-moon, badminton player
- Park Beom-shin, author
- Seo Do-young, actor
- Shin Joon-Sup, retired boxer
