= Andong Science College =

Private junior college in Andong, South Korea

- Established: 1967
- Faculty: 75
- Location: Andong, North Gyeongsang, South Korea; 36.58996°N 128.65460°E
- Website: http://www.andong-c.ac.kr/

- Andong Science College
- Hangul: 안동과학대학
- Hanja: 安東科學大學
- RR: Andong gwahak daehak
- MR: Andong kwahak taehak

Andong Science College is a small technical college in Seohu-myeon, Andong City, North Gyeongsang province, South Korea. It employs about 75 full-time instructors. Academic departments include nursing, public health administration, cyber-terror defense, physical therapy, dental hygiene, computer information, information management, and medical engineering. The campus covers 129,000 m^{2} and includes a library and gymnasium. The school maintains sister relationships with Ashland University in the United States, and domestically with Kyung Hee University.

== History ==
Unlike most technical colleges in South Korea, it began its existence as a public institution, Andong Nursing High School (안동간호고등기술학교), which was founded in 1967. The school was redesignated a technical school in 1972. In 1983, it was officially taken over by a private organization, the Jangchun Educational Foundation (학교법인 장춘학원), and was known as Andong Technical College of Health and Nursing. It became a general technical college in 1992. The school took on its current name, Andong Science College, in 1998.

In the fall of 1997, the Department of Tourism English began using native English speakers to augment their English programs. The students eventually worked in the travel industry across South Korea.

== See also ==
- Education in South Korea
- List of colleges and universities in South Korea
