= International University of Korea =

1978–2023 university in South Korea

Coordinates: 35°10′23″N 128°12′10″E

- Type: Private
- Active: 1977; 2002, chartered as a university–August 31, 2023
- Students: 5000
- Location: 660-759, 270 San, Sangmun, Munsan, Jinju, Gyyeongnam, Jinju, South Korea
- Campus: Suburban
- Nickname: IUK
- Website: http://global.iuk.ac.kr/english/main/index.php IUK English site

International University of Korea (Korean: 한국국제대학교) was a private university located in Jinju, South Korea. It is located 5 miles (8.0 km) east of Jinju. The university was closed on August 31, 2023.

Established in 1978 and later as Jinjun International University, the post secondary institution was renamed the current named in 2008.

The university was made up of seven colleges and 27 departments with total enrollment at 5,000.

IUK offers studies in Korean and English attracting mostly students from Asia (China, Japan, Mongolia, Vietnam, Philippines, Sri Lanka) as well as from Australia, Canada, United States and Turkey.

== Faculties ==
There are 27 departments at IUK:

- Early Childhood Education
- Elementary Special Education
- Physical Education
- Tourism and Japanese
- Hotel and Tourism Management
- Business Administration
- Police Administration
- Social Welfare (Social Work)
- Korean Language and Cultural Studies
- Nursing Sciences
- Physical Therapy
- Radiological Sciences
- Hospital Management
- Food Sciences
- Food and Nutrition
- Food and Culinary Services
- Mechanical and Automotive Engineering
- Fire and Disasters Prevention
- Interior Architecture (Design)
- Electrical Engineering
- Shipbuilding (Marine Engineering)
- Beauty Studies
- Sports
- Arts
- Music

== Campus ==
IUK is located in a suburban area of Jinju and consists of several buildings

- Integrative Engineering Building
- Biotech Building
- Social Sciences Building
- Education and Science Building
- Sangmun Gymnasium
- Arts Building
- Transportation Engineering Building
- Health and Welfare Building
- International Studies Building
- Administration
- Library
- Football Stadium
- Dorms
