= Kwangwoon University =

Private university in Seoul, South Korea

Coordinates: 37.6201°N 127.056°E

- 광운대학교
- Other names: Kwangwoon, KW
- Motto: Practice diligence and economy, Seek thyself a work
- Type: Private
- Established: 1934; 92 years ago
- Chairman: Cho, Sun-Young
- President: Yoon Do-yeong (윤도영)
- Faculty: 331 (full-time Professor); 108 (adjunct Professor); 419 (Lecturer)
- Administrative staff: 327 (2020)
- Students: 13,100 (2020)
- Undergraduates: 11,672 (2020)
- Postgraduates: 1,428 (2020)
- Location: Seoul, South Korea
- Mascot: Pegasus
- Website: www.kw.ac.kr
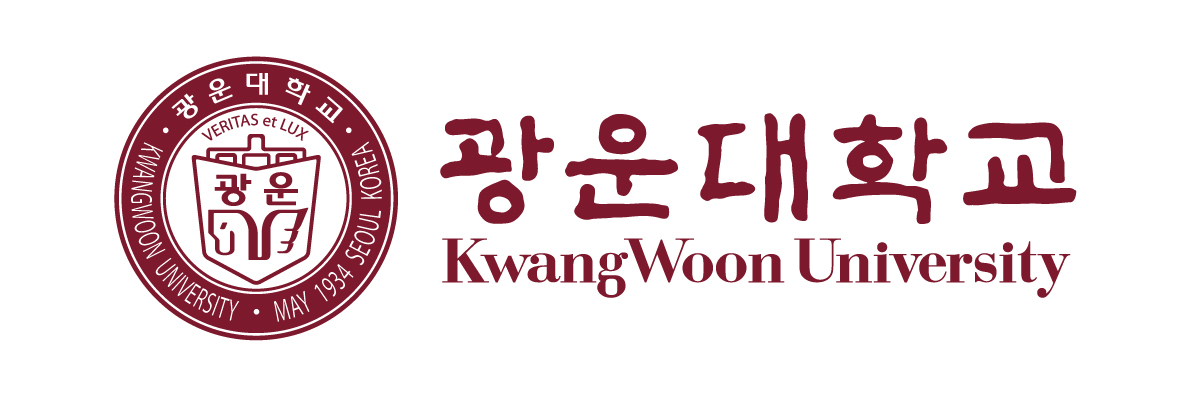

Korean name
- Hangul: 광운대학교
- Hanja: 光云大學校
- RR: Gwangun daehakgyo
- MR: Kwangun taehakkyo

Kwangwoon University (KWU; Korean: 광운대학교) is a comprehensive and private research university in Nowon-gu, Seoul, South Korea, offering undergraduate and graduate programs. Chosun Radio Training Center, the predecessor of Kwangwoon University, was the first institution to teach electronic engineering studies in Korea. The foundation is Kwangwoon Academy, an incorporated educational institution. As of 2019, there are 11,500 undergraduates and 1,292 graduate students.

== History ==
=== 1934–1987 ===
Kwangwoon started as Chosun Radio Training Center established to promote the advancement of radio technical knowledge. It was renamed in 1940 as the Chosun Institute of Radio Engineering. Started as Dong-guk Electronics College in 1962, the school became Kwangwoon Institute of Technology in 1964 and a four-year granting Kwangwoon University in 1987.

The school became a comprehensive university in 1987. Until 1995, the university was ranked top 10 overall and top 3 in the engineering fields in South Korea.

Today there are eight colleges in Kwangwoon University: College of Electronics & Information Engineering, College of Engineering, College of Natural Sciences, Division of Korean Language and Literature, College of Social Sciences, College of Law, College of Business, and College of Northeast Asia. Located in Wolgye-dong, Nowon-gu, Seoul, Kwangwoon University carries out international exchanges and cooperation programs with 83 universities worldwide in the areas of education and research.

== Global Capability Reinforcement System ==
Kwangwoon University introduced the English certification system, and gives lectures in English in 33% of the classes of major subjects as of 2011. Since 2011, freshmen have to achieve a degree of proficiency in a second foreign language (Chinese, Japanese, Spanish, or Russian) before graduation. In addition, exchange agreements have been signed with universities worldwide.

- Operating student exchange programs with 127 universities and 2 education consortia in 25 nations including the US, Japan, and China,
- Signed an agreement with University of Arkansas in the US for unlimited student exchanges.
- Established a joint course with Qingdao Science & Technology University, China, to train in architecture.

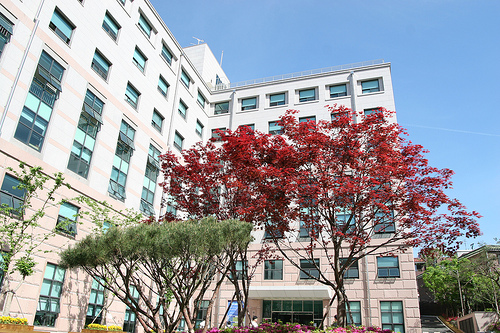
Hanwool Building on Liberal Arts Campus

== Rankings and reputation ==
- Kwangwoon University ranked 56th out of Universities of Asia in field of Engineering in the 2014 and 2015 by Quacquarelli Symonds (QS),
- Kwangwoon University ranked in the top 10 universities of Korea in 2013 and 2015 by Dong-A Ilbo,
- Kwangwoon University ranked 16th out of the nation's universities in field of Science and Engineering in 2015 by Korea Economic Daily (한국경제신문)
- The number of publications in international journals (SCI papers) and domestic papers per professors ranked 2nd among universities in Korea for three consecutive years (2010–2012).

== Graduate schools ==
- Graduate School of Business Administration
- Graduate School of Smart Convergence (Note: until 2017 named Graduate School of Information Contents.)
- Graduate School of Education
- Graduate School of Environment Studies
- Graduate School of Counseling, Welfare and Policy
- Graduate School of information and Communication

== Schools and divisions ==
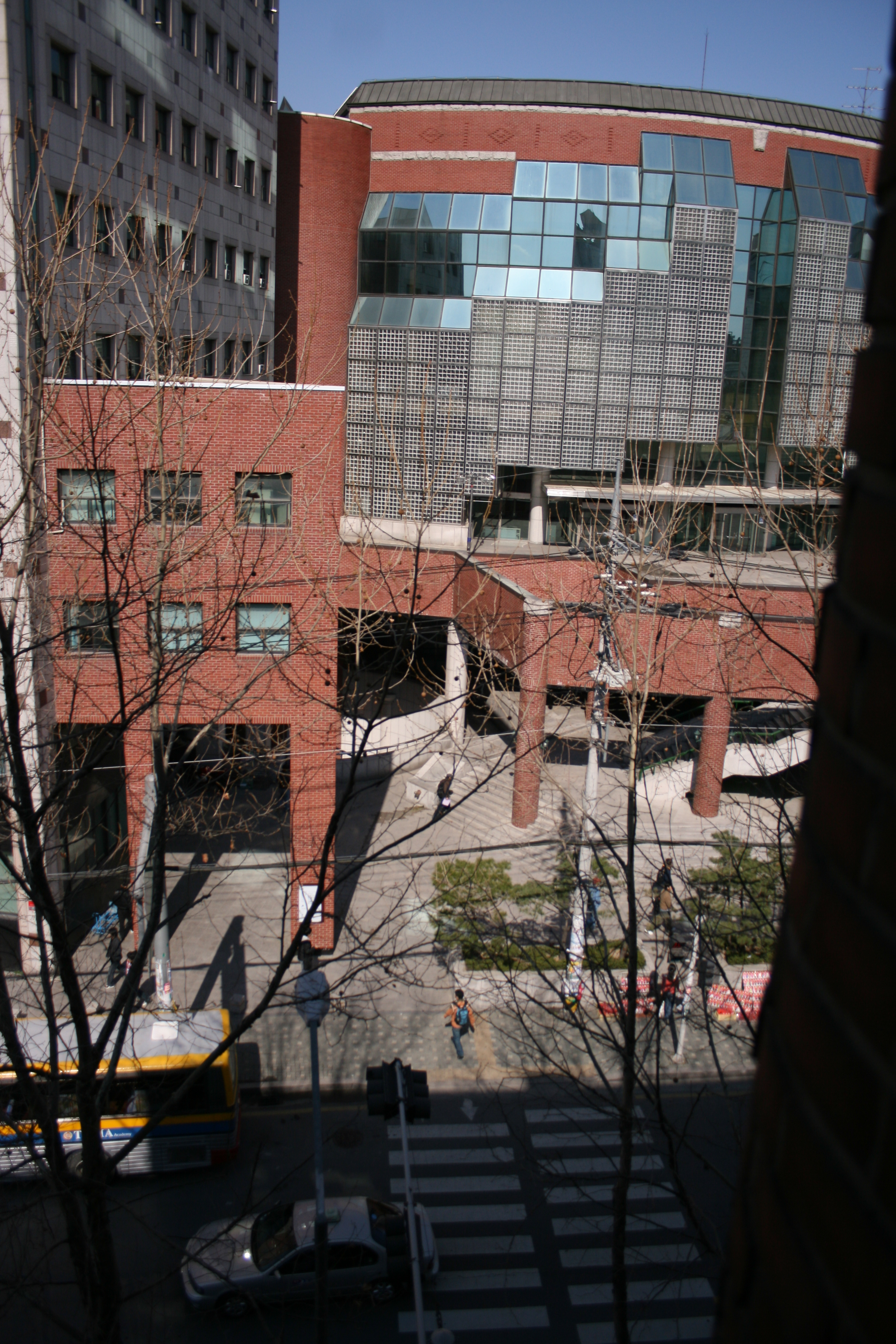
Donghae Arts Center

=== College of Electronics & Information Engineering ===
Chosun Radio Training Center, the predecessor of Kwangwoon University, was the first institution to teach electronic engineering studies in Korea(Chosun). Kwangwoon University established primally college of Electronics&Information Engineering and Department of Electronic engineering in Republic of Korea. To be exact, Dr. Cho Kwangwoon brought the study of electronic engineering to Korea(Chosun), and Chosun Radio Training Center that is the predecessor of Kwangwoon University established in 1934 is the first academy to teach the study of electronic engineering in Chosun(Korea).

- Department of Electronic Engineering
- Department of Electronics & Communications Engineering
- Department of Electronic Convergence Engineering
- Department of Electric Engineering
- Department of Electronic Materials Engineering
- Division of Robotics: (Information Control, Intelligence System)

=== College of Software and Convergence Technology ===
- School of Software
- School of Computer and Information Engineering
- Department of Information Convergence

=== College of Engineering ===
- Department of Architectural Engineering
- Department of Chemical Engineering
- Department of Environmental Engineering
- Department of Architecture

=== College of Natural Sciences ===
- Department of Mathematics
- Department of Electrical and Biological Physics
- Department of Chemistry
- Department of Sports & Leisure Studies
- Department of Information Contents (evening program)

=== College of Business ===
- Division of Business Administration
- Division of International Trade: (Korea-Japan Trade Major, Korea-China Trade Major)

=== College of Humanities and Social Sciences ===
- Department of Korean Language and Literature
- Department of English Language and Literature
- School of Communications: (Media and Information, Digital Media, Strategic Communication)
- Department of Industrial Psychology
- Division of Northeast Asia Cultural Industries: (Cultural Exchange, Cultural Content Development)

=== College of Law and Public Policy ===
- Department of Public Administration
- Division of Law
- Division of International Studies: (International Area Studies, Global Korea)
- Department of Asset Management (evening program)

=== College of Northeast Asia (Abolished) ===
In 2008, The college of northeast Asia was established. However, due to the education ministry's order, each department has been banned from accepting new students since 2016. Therefore, the three departments were relocated to the college of business, the college of humanities and social sciences and the college of law and public·policy, respectively.

- Division of Northeast Asia Trade
- Division of Northeast Asia Industry and Culture
- Division of International Studies

== International partnerships ==
Kwangwoon University has signed agreements with several international universities.

=== Germany ===
- Hochschule Macromedia, University of Applied Sciences
- Fachhochschule des Mittelstandes
- University of Applied Sciences – Zwickau

== Student activities and awards ==
=== Student activities ===
- Kwangwoon University Global Challengers
- Kwangwoon University Global Volunteers in countries such as Indonesia, Vietnam, Lao, Mongolia and Nepal.
- Kwangwoon University Robot Camp for youth since 2008

=== Awards ===
International academic awards

- ROBIT won 6 gold medals and ranked 2nd of 2008 RoboGames in United States of America
- The team HOMERUN won the 1st prize in Imagine Cup 2011 for Window Phone held by Microsoft, United States of America
- ROBIT won the championship of the 3rd Asia Robo-one in Korea, 2007.
- ROBIT won championship in humanoid in International Robot contest in three years 2008, 2013 and 2014 held in Korea
- ROBIT won the championship of the 15th Robo-One in Japan, 2009
- ROBIT won the presidential award for 2009 International Robot Contest, Busan, Korea
- Robot Team (BARAM) won the Chairman's Award in Texas Instruments Innovation Challenge: Korean MCU Design Contest 2013.
- Robot Team (ROBIT) won the presidential awards in 2015, 2016 and 2017 International Robot Contest and R-BIZ challenge among 3000 participated teams,
- Kwangwoon University Robot team (Robit) ranked 2nd in 2017 international Robocup: RobocupSoccer humanoid Teen size held in Nagoya, Japan, 2017;

National academic awards

- Robot Team (BARAM) won the grand prize in 2013 Korea Intelligent Robot Contest, Korea
- The Students from Department of Computer Engineering won the 1st prize in the first Hyundai Hackathon: Connect the Unconnected in 2016 held by Hyundai Motor Group
- Kwangwoon University Robot team (Robit) won championship of 2017 Robocup Korea Open: soccer humanoid League for Students from Korea and other countries

Sports

- Kwangwoon University soccer team won the champion of the 2014 Cafe Bene U-League championship for University Soccer teams
- Kwangwoon University ice hockey team won the champion of the 98th National Winter Sport Contest for Korean Universities

== Alumni and faculty ==
There are more than 60,000 Kwangwoon alumni worldwide. Notable alumni include:

=== Business, technology, and finance ===
- Han Do-Hee, vice president of Hewlett-Packard (HP) in Korea

=== Politics and law ===
- Park Jong-gil, vice minister of Ministry of Culture, Sports and Tourism and former national team shooter

=== Broadcasting, entertainment, and sport ===
- Choi Soon-Ho, Vice president of Korea Football Association and former national team footballer
- Seol Ki-Hyeon, Former national team footballer (2002–2009).
- Inbee Park, LPGA professional golfer
- Kim Soo-chul, Singer and composer
- Kim Won-hee, television presenter and actress
- Cho Hang Cho, Singer

== See also ==
- Kwangwoon Electronics Technical High School
