= U1 University =

Coordinates: 36.1958°N 127.7995°E

U1 University is a private university located in Yeongdong-eup, Yeongdong County, North Chungcheong Province, South Korea. It employs approximately 65 full-time instructors. Although historically focused on engineering, the university now offers degree programs in fields including English as an international language, leisure studies, and special education.

== History ==
The Geumgang Educational Foundation received governmental permission to establish the college in 1993, and the first students were welcomed into Youngdong Engineering College (영동공과대학) on March 8, 1994. It became a university in the following year, and changed its name to Youngdong University on December 1,1997.1, 1997

== See also ==
- List of colleges and universities in South Korea
- Education in South Korea
