= Daegu Arts University =

South Korean private university

Coordinates: 36.0329°N 128.5102°E

- Hangul: 대구예술대학교
- Hanja: 大邱藝術大學校
- RR: Daegu yesul daehakgyo
- MR: Taegu yesul taehakkyo

Daegu Arts University is a South Korean private university specializing in training for the fine arts. Its campus is located a short distance north of Daegu metropolitan city, in Gasan-myeon of Chilgok County, North Gyeongsang province. About 35 instructors are employed. The current president is Lee Seong-geun (이성근).

== Academics ==
The university's academic offerings are divided among divisions of Artistic Theory, Design Theory, Music Theory, and Multimedia Photography Theory.

== History ==
The school first opened as Daegu Arts College in 1993. It became a university in 1996.

== See also ==
- List of colleges and universities in South Korea
- Education in South Korea
