= Honam University =

Private university in Gwangju, South Korea

Coordinates: 35.1508°N 126.7685°E

- Type: Private university
- Established: December 28, 1978; 47 years ago
- Academic staff: 286 (2022)
- Total staff: 113 (excluding faculty) (2022)
- Undergraduates: 8,926 (2022)
- Postgraduates: 943 (2022)
- Location: Gwangsan-gu, 호남대길 100, Gwangju, South Korea
- Colors: Blue-green

Korean name
- Hangul: 호남대학교
- Hanja: 湖南大學校
- RR: Honam daehakgyo
- MR: Honam taehakkyo

Honam University (Korean: 호남대학교) is a private university located in Gwangsan District, Gwangju, South Korea.
