= Cheongju University =

Private university in South Korea

- Type: Private
- Established: 1947
- President: Chung Sung Bong
- Location: Cheongju, North Chungcheong, South Korea; 36.65265°N 127.49539°E
- Website: cju.ac.kr

- Cheongju University
- Hangul: 청주대학교
- Hanja: 淸州大學校
- RR: Cheongju daehakgyo
- MR: Ch'ŏngju taehakkyo

Cheongju University (Korean: 청주대학교) is a private university located in Cheongju City, the capital of North Chungcheong province, South Korea.

== Academics ==
Undergraduate studies at the university are divided among eight colleges: Economics & Business Administration, Law, Humanities, Science & Engineering, Education, Arts, Social Sciences, and the Evening College (which offers part-time evening instruction in diverse subject areas). Graduate programs are provided through five graduate schools: Higher Education, Industrial Engineering, Public Administration, Business Administration, and Education. In addition, several research institutes operate on the campus. These include the Research Institute of Industrial Management, the Industrial Science Research Institute, the Information and Communication Research Center, and two business incubators: the Technology & Business Incubator and the Internet Business Incubating Center.

== History ==
The school opened its doors as Cheongju Commercial College (청주상과대학) on June 6, 1947. It became simply Cheongju College in 1951. It gained university status in 1981. A second campus was constructed near the first one in 1989.

== Notable people ==
- Jung Jin-young, singer and actor (B1A4)
- Kang Suk-jung, actor
- Kim Young-ho, actor
- Lee Jin-wook, actor
- Park Seong-ho, comedian
- Song Il-gook, actor
- Kim Ji-eun, actress
- Kwangchul Youn (born 1966), operatic bass and academic voice teacher
- Yi Jeong-gyu
- Byeon Woo-seok, actor

== See also ==
- Cheongju National University of Education (another nearby university)
- List of colleges and universities in South Korea
- Education in South Korea
