= Chunnam Techno University =

Private technical college in South Korea

- 전남과학대학
- Location: South Jeolla, South Korea; 35.27581°N 127.13171°E
- Website: www.chunnam-c.ac.kr

- Chunnam Techno University
- Hangul: 전남과학대학
- Hanja: 全南科學大學
- RR: Jeonnam gwahak daehak
- MR: Chŏnnam kwahak taehak

Chunnam Techno University (Korean: 전남과학대학) is a private technical university in South Korea. Its campus is located in Gokseong County, South Jeolla province. The current president is Cho Sung Soo (조성수).

== Academics ==
The undergraduate offerings are divided among four divisions (IT, International Tourism, Physical Education, and Tae Kwon Do), as well as a number of unaffiliated departments (such as automotive repair, music, and social welfare). A mixture of two- and three-year programs are provided.

== History ==
The school opened in 1991. It was founded by the Okgwa Foundation, which had previously established middle and high schools.

== Sister schools ==
Ties exist with universities in the following countries: Austria, Canada, France, China, Japan, Malaysia, the Philippines, and the United States.

== Notable alumni ==
- Jo In-sung, actor

== See also ==
- Education in South Korea
- List of colleges and universities in South Korea
