= Jeonju University =

University in Jeonju, South Korea

Coordinates: 35.8131°N 127.0896°E

- 전주대학교
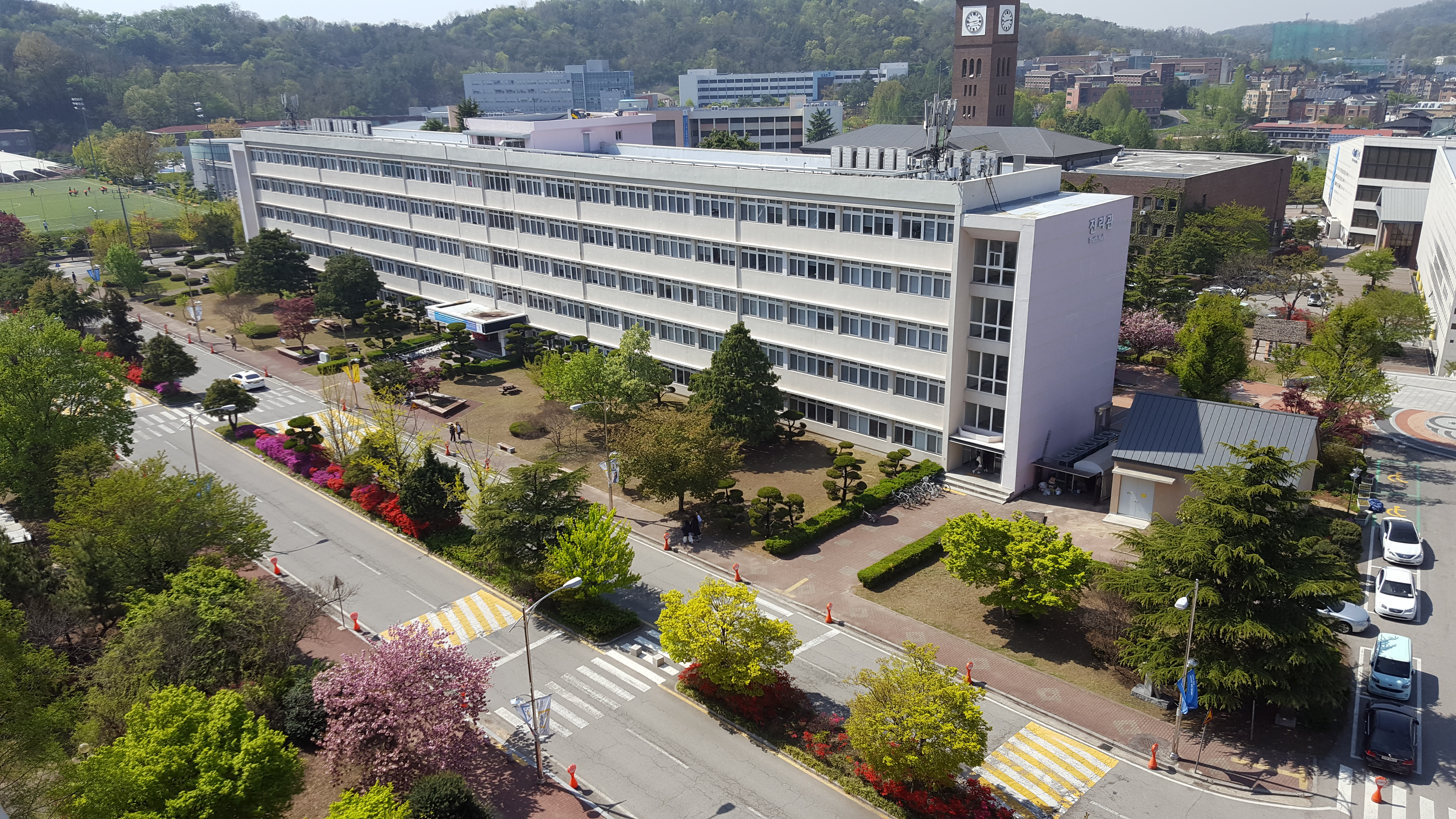
- Motto: 진리 평화 자유 (Truth, Peace and Freedom)
- Type: Private
- Established: January 9, 1964
- President: Ryu Du-hyeon (류두현)
- Academic staff: 346 full-time (April 2008)
- Students: 11,468 (April 2008)
- Undergraduates: 10,534
- Postgraduates: 934
- Location: Wansan-gu, Jeonju, Jeollabuk-do, South Korea
- Campus: Urban
- Website: www.jj.ac.kr

- Jeonju University
- Hangul: 전주대학교
- Hanja: 全州大學校
- RR: Jeonju daehakgyo
- MR: Chŏnju taehakkyo

Jeonju University (JJ) is a private Christian university in South Korea. The campus is located in 1200 Hyoja-dong, Wansan-gu, Jeonju, Jeollabuk-do. The current president is Ryu Du-hyeon.

== History ==
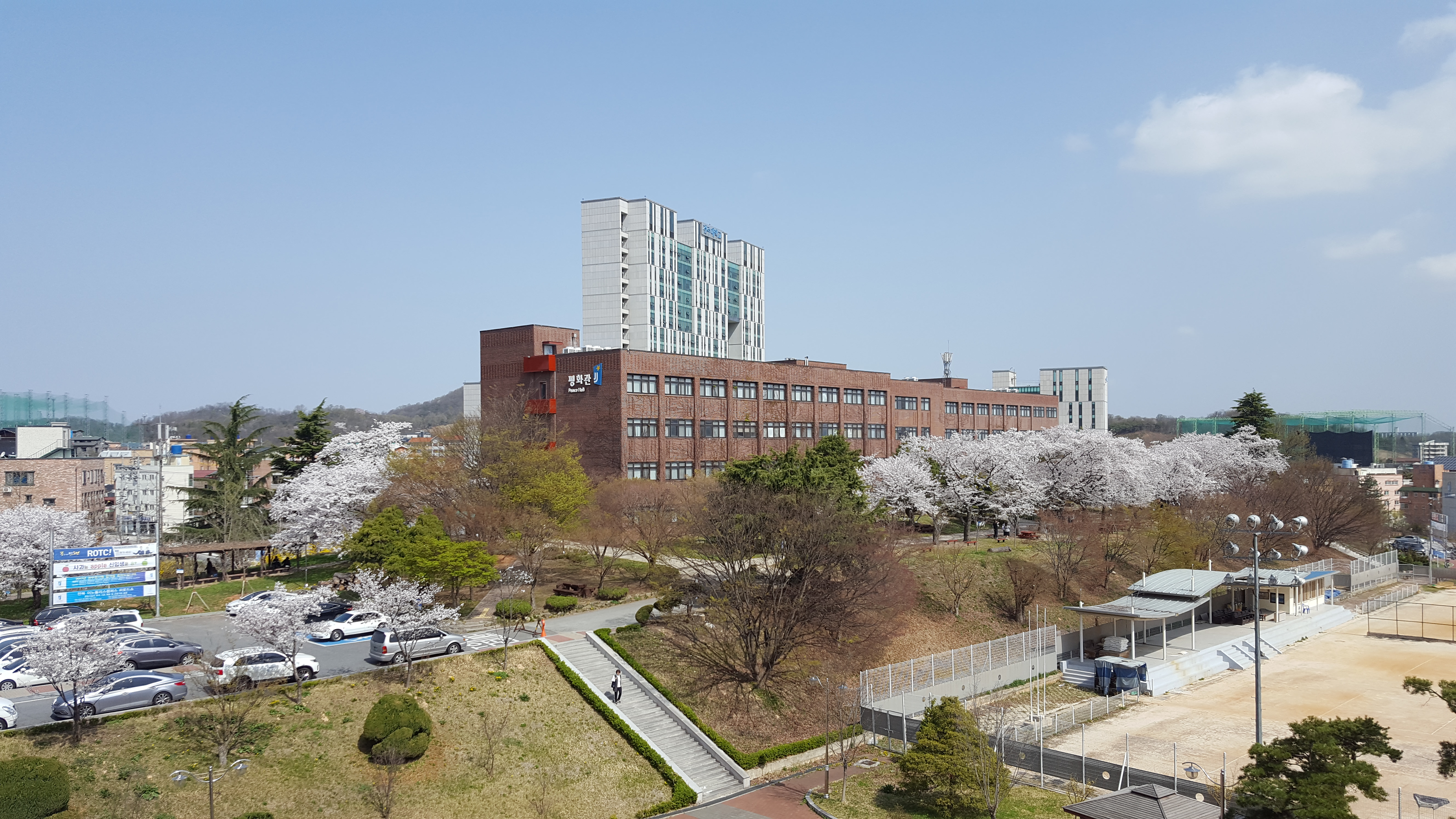

Jeonju University was founded on January 9, 1964, as Jeonju Youngsaeng College (an evening college). In December 1977 the school foundation established a daytime college, and on October 7, 1978, the college was renamed Jeonju College. In February 1981 it moved to present-day Hyoja-dong Campus. It acquired a university status on September 8, 1983, and renamed Jeonju University. In December 1984 Shindonga Group succeeded the school foundation.

== Undergraduate Schools ==
- College of Humanities
- College of Social Sciences
- College of Economics and Business Administration
- College of Alternative Medicine
  - Departments: Physical Therapy and Radiological Science
- College of Engineering
- College of Arts and Athletics
- College of Culture and Tourism
- College of Education
- College of Culture and Creative Industry
- School of Liberal Arts

== Graduate Schools ==
- General Graduate School
- Special Graduate Schools
  - Graduate School of Public Administration
  - Graduate School of International Studies and Management
  - Graduate School of Education
  - Graduate School of Information and Industrial Engineering
  - Graduate School of Mission and Theology
  - Graduate School of Counseling
  - Graduate School of Alternative Medicine

== Notable people ==
- Kim Woo-bin, actor and model
- Jo Seok, webtoon artist
