= Dong-Eui University =

Private university in Busan, South Korea

- 동의대학교 (東義大學校)
- Type: Private
- Established: 1977; 49 years ago
- Location: Busan, South Korea
- Website: eng.deu.ac.kr/main.do, www.demc.kr

Dong-Eui University (Korean: 동의대학교) is a private university in Busan, a metropolitan city on the southeastern coast of South Korea. The university comprises 10 colleges and offers 116 master's and doctoral programs across six graduate schools, It has an enrollment of approximately 22,992 students and employs around 1,690 faculty and staff members. Dong-Eui is particularly known for its medicine and engineering departments. It also has a strong reputation in management, health sciences, nursing, and various other scientific disciplines.

== Colleges and graduate schools ==
=== Colleges ===
- College of Humanities
- College of Law and Government
- College of Commerce and Economics
- College of Natural Sciences
- College of Korean Medicine
- College of Human Ecology
- College of Engineering
- College of Visual Image and Information Technology
- College of Art and Design
- College of Sport Science

=== Graduate schools ===
- Graduate School
- Graduate School of Public Administration
- Graduate School of Business
- Graduate School of Industry
- Graduate School of Education
- Graduate School of Visual Image and Information

== History ==
The university was established in 1979 as a four-year college named Dong-Eui College (동의대학), with an initial enrollment of 400 students. It was founded by the Dong-Eui Educational Foundation (established in 1966), which had also established a middle school, high school, and junior college. Beginning in 1976, the foundation also operated the Kyungdong Engineering Professional School on the future site of the university campus. The college gained university status in 1983 and opened its graduate school the following year. In June 1990, Dong-Eui Hospital and the Korean Medicine Hospital of Dong-Eui University were opened under the name Dong-Eui Medical Center.

== University libraries ==
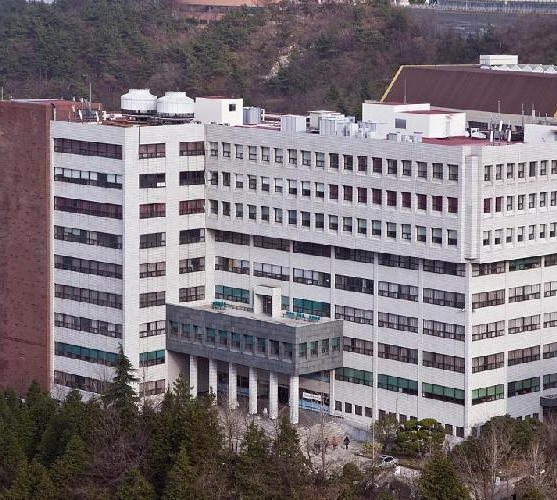
Dong-Eui University Central Library

The University Library system holds over one million book volumes and 2,000 current serial publications. Its collections include maps, newspapers, microforms, government documents, CD-ROMs, research reports, and videos. The system comprises the Central Library and the Korean Medicine Library.

== Intercollegiate athletics ==
The university has a rich heritage in intercollegiate athletics. The university has baseball, men's soccer, men's judo and fencing teams. The baseball team has won national championships four times.

== Student housing ==
The university maintains four residence hall complexes, which house approximately 3,200 students.

== Notable people ==
- Juno, singer
- Kim Yoon-seok, actor
- Oh Dal-su, actor
- Kim Jun-ho, fencer
- Kim Jung Gi, illustrator

== See also ==
- List of colleges and universities in South Korea
- Education in South Korea
