= Yong In University =

University in South Korea

- 용인대학교
- Motto: 道義相磨 欲而爲人 도의를 갈고 닦아 사회에 이바지할 수 있는 인간이 되자 (Korean)
- Motto in English: Contribute to society by cultivating a strong sense of individual justice and morality
- Type: Private
- Established: 1953
- President: Park, Sun-Kyong
- Faculty: 374 (Full-time); 607 (Adjunct)
- Administrative staff: 234
- Students: 15,097
- Undergraduates: 11,516
- Postgraduates: 3,581
- Location: Yongin, Gyeonggi-do, South Korea; 37.227°N 127.168°E
- Campus: Urban
- Colors: Yongin Green
- Website: int.yongin.ac.kr/eng/

- Yong In University
- Hangul: 용인대학교
- Hanja: 龍仁大學校
- RR: Yongin daehakgyo
- MR: Yongin taehakkyo

Yong In University is a private university located in Samga-dong, Cheoin-gu, Yongin-si, Gyeonggi-do, South Korea. Founded as a judo school, it expanded to the present-day comprehensive private university offering both undergraduate and graduate courses.

== History ==
Yong In University is a private university located in Samga-dong, Choin-gu, Yongin-shi, Kyonggi Province, Korea. The school opened as Korea Judo School in 1953 under the founding slogan of "Be the one who contributes to society through moral cultivation." It was commissioned as a four-year undergraduate school in 1971 and changed its name to Korea Physical Science College to the current name, Yong In University in 1993. Started as a physical education college, it is a private university with total 35 departments for both day and night sessions in the 6 colleges: Martial Art, Physical Science, Culture & Art, Business Administration, Environmental Science and Health & Welfare. Also, the university has established 7 special graduate schools in Education, Physical Science, Art, Business, Rehabilitation & Health Science, Taekwondo, Cultural Asset and one general graduate school with 8 subordinate organizations including the Central Library and 18 affiliate organizations to develop competitive global talents.

== Colleges ==
- College of Martial Arts
  - Dept. of Judo Archived 2012-11-18 at the Wayback Machine
  - Dept. of Judo Instructor Education Archived 2015-08-20 at the Wayback Machine
  - Dept. of Combative Martial Arts Training Archived 2012-09-30 at the Wayback Machine
  - Dept. of Oriental Martial Arts Archived 2016-03-04 at the Wayback Machine
  - Dept. of Taekwondo Archived 2014-03-30 at the Wayback Machine
  - Dept. of Security Service
  - Dept. of Military Science
- College of Sports Sciences
  - Dept. of Sport & Leisure Studies Archived 2014-07-08 at the Wayback Machine
  - Dept. of Physical Education Archived 2016-03-04 at the Wayback Machine
  - Dept. of Golf Archived 2014-07-06 at the Wayback Machine
  - Dept. of Special Physical Education Archived 2016-03-04 at the Wayback Machine
- College of Arts and Culture
  - Dept. of Dance Archived 2016-03-04 at the Wayback Machine
  - Dept. of Media Design
  - Dept. of Fine Arts
  - Dept. of Theatre
  - Dept. of Korean Traditional Music
  - Dept. of Film
  - Dept. of Cultural Property
  - Dept. of Cultural Content Archived 2016-03-04 at the Wayback Machine
  - Dept. of Applied Music
- College of Business and Public Administration
  - Dept. of Business Administration Archived 2016-12-23 at the Wayback Machine
  - Dept. of Culture & Tourism
  - Dept. of Management Information Systems Archived 2016-03-04 at the Wayback Machine
  - Dept. of Police Administration
  - Dept. of Chinese Studies Archived 2016-03-04 at the Wayback Machine
  - Dept. of English Archived 2016-03-04 at the Wayback Machine
  - Dept. of Beauty business
- College of Environmental Sciences
  - Dept. of Occupational and Environmental Health Archived 2016-03-04 at the Wayback Machine
  - Dept. of Environmental Science Archived 2016-03-04 at the Wayback Machine
  - Dept. of Computer Science Archived 2016-03-03 at the Wayback Machine
  - Dept. of Logistics Statistics & Information Systems Archived 2016-03-04 at the Wayback Machine
  - Dept. of Life Science Archived 2015-01-31 at the Wayback Machine
- College of Public Health and Welfare
  - Dept. of Food Science and Nutrition Archived 2016-03-04 at the Wayback Machine
  - Dept. of Physical Therapy
  - Dept. of Social Welfare Archived 2016-03-04 at the Wayback Machine

== Graduate school ==
- Graduate School
- Graduate School of Sports Wellness Industry
- Graduate School of Business Administration
- Graduate School of Education
- Graduate School of Arts and Culture
- Graduate School of Rehabilitation and Welfare
- Graduate School of Taekwondo studies
- Graduate School of Reunification

== International Exchange Programs ==
Foreign Language Education Program Yong In University has audio video labs and is operating training programs to provide counselling, guidance and person-to-person tutoring by professors.

Study Abroad System The university runs language programs and holds foreign language contests (English, Chinese, Japanese) every semester hosted by the International Education Institute, providing study abroad opportunities in each semester to awarded students.

Exchange Student Program Exchange students can choose among English, Japanese and Chinese-speaking countries. They are selected based on their language proficiency and are given chances to study abroad either in March/April for the first semester and September/October in the second semester.

International Exchange Partners

Global in Yong In University

- China
  - Central University of Finance and Economics
  - Harbin Normal University
  - Shandong University
  - Ji Lin University
  - Capital Institute of Physical Education
  - Qiqihar University
  - Zhejiang University
  - Hunan Normal University
  - Zhejiang Gongshang University
  - Yanbian University
  - Shenyang Sport University
  - The Hang Zhou Jiang Nan College
  - Suqian Zeda Vocational & Technical College
- Taiwan
  - National Taiwan Sport University
  - Chinese Culture University
- Japan
  - Nihon University
  - Sendai University
  - International Budo University
  - Nagoya University of Arts
  - Yamaguchi University of Human Welfare and Culture
- Australia
  - Victoria University
  - Swinburne University of Technology
  - Holmsglen Institute of TAFE
- Malaysia
  - HELP University
- USA
  - University of California, Berkeley
  - University of Utah
  - Mississippi State University
  - Centenary College
  - Lewis & Clark College
  - Smithsonian Institution
  - California State University, Bakersfield
  - Professional Golfers Career College
- Germany
  - Cologne University
- Russia
  - Lesgaft Institute of Sports
- Canada
  - The University of British Columbia
  - Seneca College
  - The University of Winnipeg
- The United Kingdom
  - University of Portsmouth
  - Kent Institute of Art and Design
- Spain
  - Universidad Politecnica De Madrid
- Poland
  - Joef Pitsudski University of Physical Education
- Philippines
  - Bulacan State University

== Grade/graduation ==
Early graduation

This is a system to confer an undergraduate degree to outstanding students who have acquired credits required for graduation within six to seven semesters.

Credit Exchange with Open Cyber University (OCU)

The student can acquire maximum six credits per semester online.

Credit Exchange Program

Yong In University has an agreement with 26 other universities in Kyonggi-Incheon area to exchange students and to acknowledge credits earned at the partner school.

Professional Teacher Education Program

Students who enroll in the college of education or departments in which teaching course is established/approved can acquire a certificate for secondary school teacher (Level 2).

== Campus life ==
Research activities

Dissertation presentations and academic events on majors are held by college and department, academic society, circle. Dissertations are published on and off campus journals and relevant lectures are held as well.

University Magazine Publication

The School Paper Editing Committee publishes school paper Danho every year. Information on social issues, dissertation, essay and literature are included. Outstanding works are awarded the Baekho Literature Award every year.

University Festival

This is a festival of academic lectures, presentations, exhibition of illustrated poems, singing contest, broadcast festival, concerts by circles and scheduled events. School faculty, alumni and campus neighbors participate.

University Sports Festival

This is a festival in which colleges and departments compete against one another in sport.

== Auxiliary organizations ==
University Library

With Academic Information Support Section and Academic Information Reading Section, Yong In University Central Library comprises 2 five-story buildings (total 7,606 m^{2}).

University Museum

The museum, located within Yong In University campus, accommodates exhibit hall, storages, data rooms, preservation rooms and research rooms of 795 m^{2}. Exhibitions and academic conferences are held in the museum, which is registered as the career certifying institution and the professional institution for the exploration of culture assets and the survey on landmarks.

Office of Athletics

The Directorate was established to provide support to sports talents and the training team.

University Newspaper and Broadcasting Center

The university newspaper is a media body of the university.

The Education Broadcast System was opened on October 23, 1986.

Center for Industry and Academic Cooperation

The committee provides administrative support and assistance in human resource development, R&D, technology transfer through research commissioned and coordination with industrial bodies.

Sports & Wellness Research Center

Office of Information Management

This provides information dissemination system via high speed wireless network, all-in-one information system, lecture support system, portal system, etc.

== Campus ==
Yong In University campus

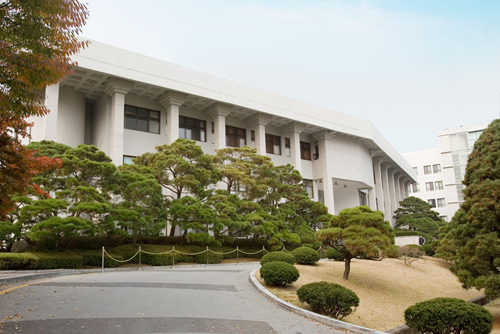
Administrative offices

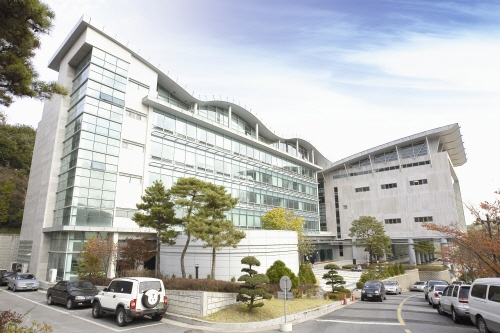
College of Martial Arts

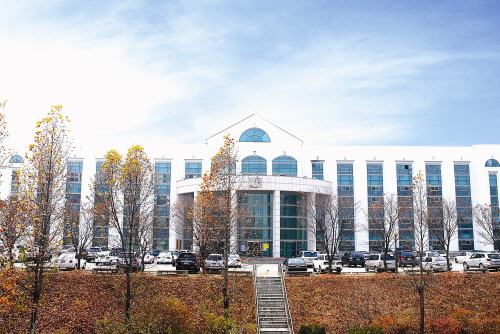
College of Sports Sciences

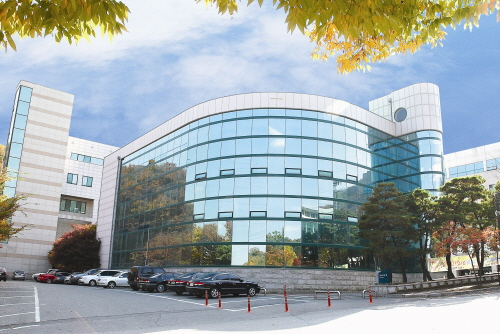
College of Arts & Culture

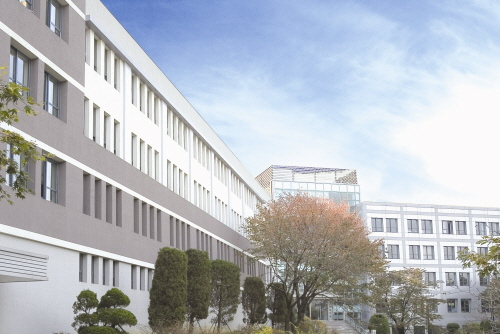
College of Business and Public Administration

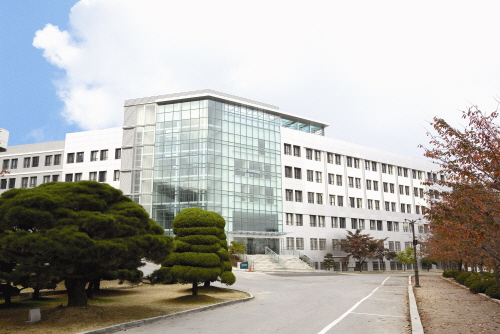
College of Environmental

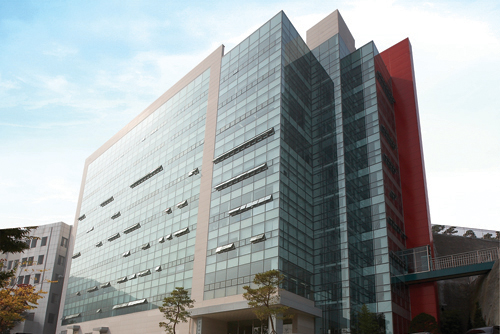
College of Public Health & Welfare

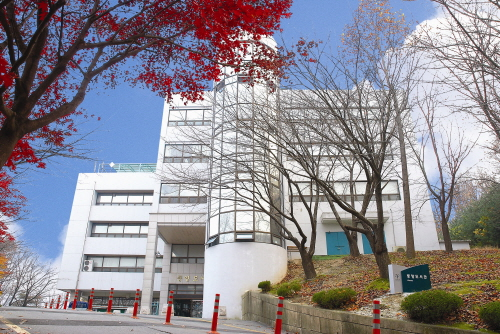
Yong In University Library

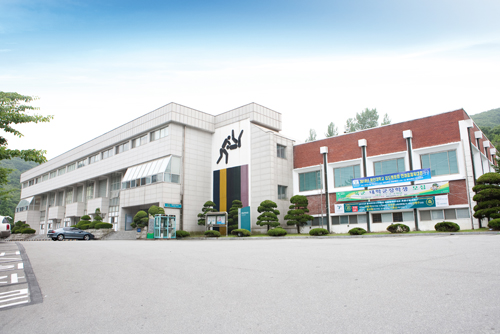
Gymnasium

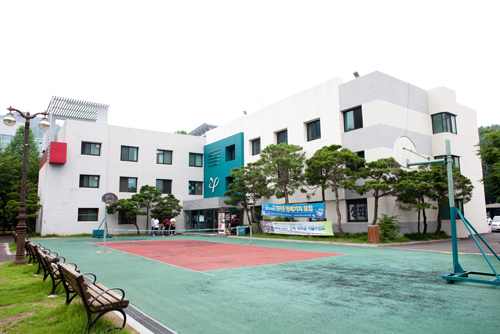
Insung Hall (Student Union)

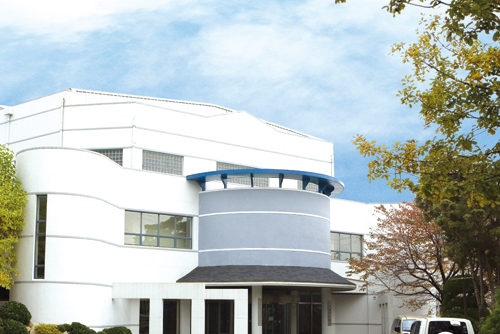
ROTC

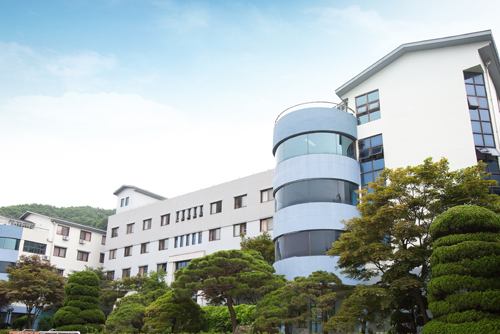
Dormitory

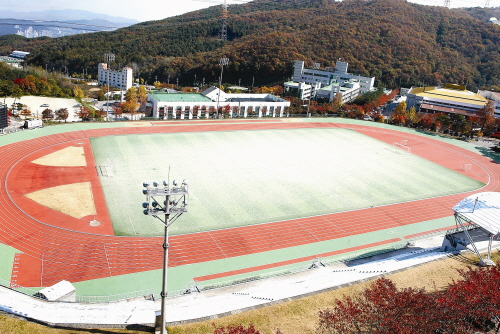
Track and field

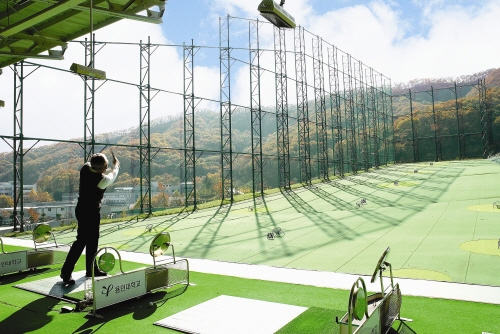
Golf driving range

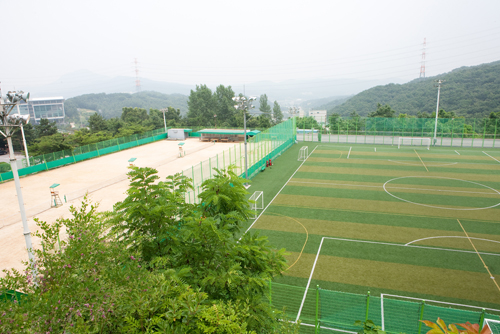
Multi-purpose sports field

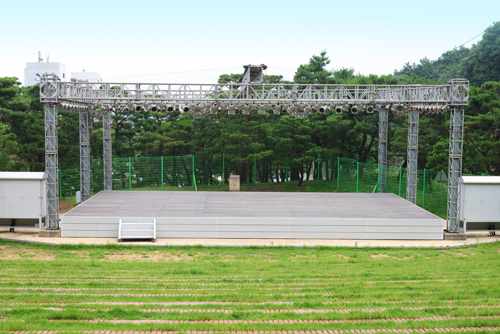
Open-air theater

== Notable alumni ==
- Jang Ki-yong
- Baek Jin-hee
- Choi Ji-ho
- Gary (Leessang)
- Hwang In-young
- Hyun Young
- Kim Dong-hyun, professional Mixed Martial Artist
- Kim Jae-bum
- Kim Sa-rang
- Kyu Ha Kim
- Lee Dae-hoon, taekwondo athlete
- Sung Hoon
- Won Bin
- Yang Dong-geun
- Yoon Se-ah
- Yong Chin Pak
- Lee Jung-hyun (Actor)
- Kim Go-eun (Laysha)
