= Sangji University =

Private university in Wonju, South Korea

- (상지대학교)
- Motto: GENS21
- Type: Private
- Established: 1974
- Faculty: 222
- Students: 7,576
- Location: Wonju, Gangwon, South Korea
- Campus: Urban 1,694,679 square metres (418.764 acres)
- Newspaper: The Sangji Herald
- Colors: Green and Blue
- Website: sangji.ac.kr

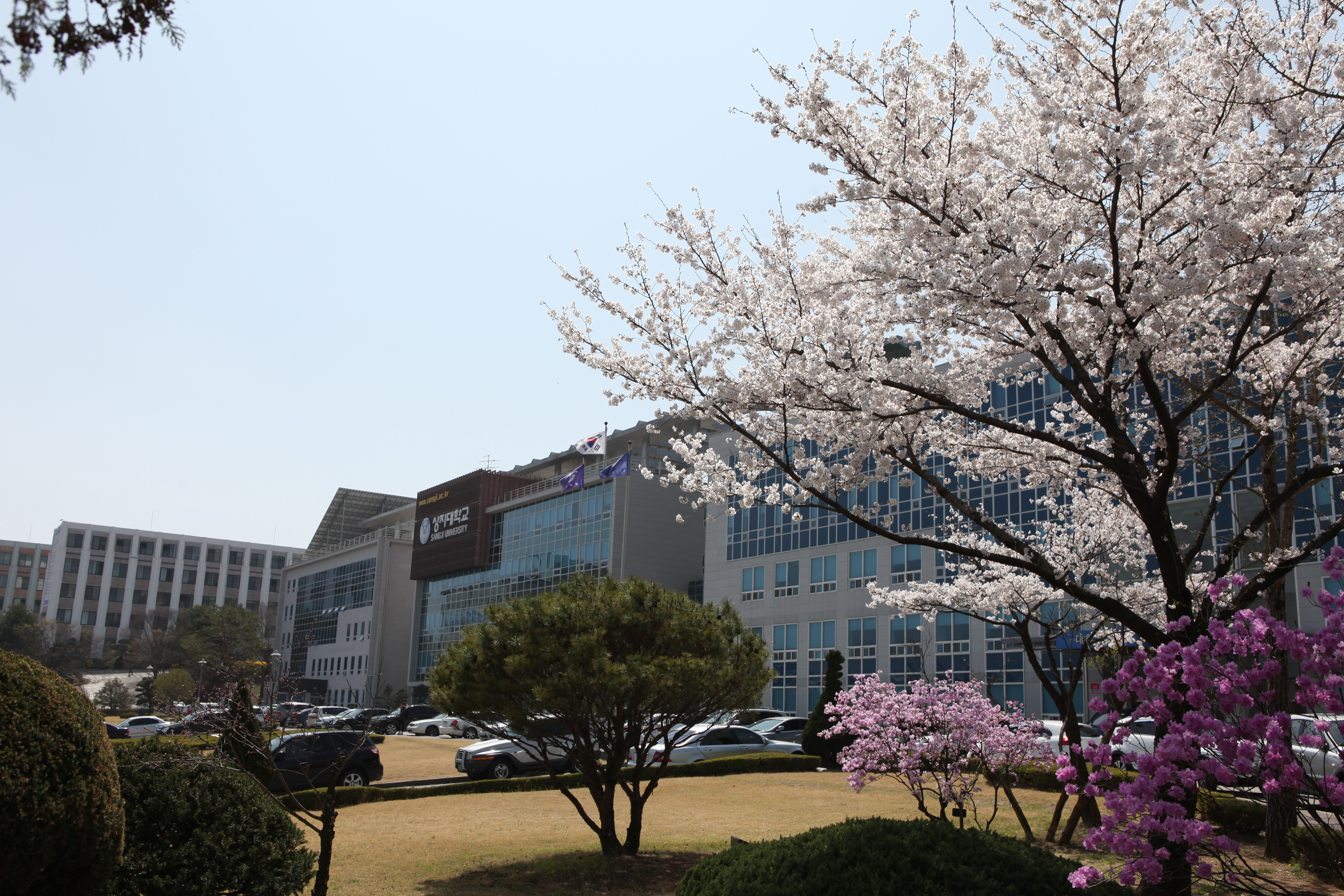
상지대 본관 봄2

Sangji University (Korean: 상지대학교) is a private university located in Wonju, Gangwon Province, South Korea. Established in 1955, it has seven colleges and six graduate schools. Its top areas of study are Oriental Medicine (one of only 11 in the country) and Tourism. The Sangji Foundation also manages Sangji Yeongseo College and Sangji Girls Middle and High Schools.

== Location ==
The scenic campus is located on a hill in Woosan-dong and offers a wonderful view of Mt. Chiak. Many students commute to Sangji University from Seoul, which is less than two hours away.

== Facilities ==
- Since 2007, the university has offered an English Cafe on campus for students to practice English.
- The university is focused on environmentally friendly heating and cooling systems.

== Notable alumni ==
- Chun Jung-myung
- Kang Full
- Kim Hee-chul (Super Junior)
- Kim Jung-Joo
- Yumi Heo

== See also ==
- List of colleges and universities in South Korea
- Education in South Korea
