= University of Ulsan =

Private university in South Korea

Coordinates: 35°32′33.98″N 129°15′24.21″E

- 울산대학교
- Motto: "Challenge, Accomplish, and Share" 진리ㆍ자주ㆍ봉사
- Type: Private
- Established: March 16, 1970
- President: Yeon Cheon Oh
- Faculty: 1,016
- Students: 20,798
- Undergraduates: 13,587
- Postgraduates: 1,637
- Location: Ulsan, South Korea
- Colours: UOU Green; UOU Gray; UOU Yellow
- Mascot: Qilin
- Website: ulsan.ac.kr

- University of Ulsan
- Hangul: 울산대학교
- Hanja: 蔚山大學校
- RR: Ulsan daehakgyo
- MR: Ulsan taehakkyo

The University of Ulsan (UOU; Korean: 울산대학교) is a private university in Nam District, Ulsan, South Korea. It was founded on February 19, 1969 as the Ulsan Institute of Technology by Chung Ju-yung, the founder of Hyundai Group. It was expanded into a four-year university on March 1, 1985. The university currently has approximately 10,500 students enrolled.

The city of Ulsan has been recognized as the Korean city built around the corporate base of the multinational Hyundai conglomerate. Hyundai announced its plan to give 40 billion won to assist a variety of university-industry cooperation projects.

== Academics ==
Even though it started as Ulsan Institute of Technology, University of Ulsan today offers programs in broad area through 12 colleges. There are 6 different graduate schools including the general Graduate School which offers Master's degrees in 29 different disciplines and Doctorate degrees in 19 different areas of study. In 2007, 12,614 undergraduate students and 1,637 graduate students are enrolled in the university.

=== Colleges (Undergraduate) ===
- College of Humanities
- College of Social Sciences
- College of Business Administration
- College of Natural Sciences
- College of Human Ecology
- College of Engineering
- College of Architecture
- College of Music
- College of Fine Arts
- College of Design
- College of Medicine
- College of Industry and Management

=== Graduate Schools ===
- The Graduate School
- Graduate School of Business
- Graduate School of Public Policy
  - Social Welfare
  - Public Policy
- Graduate School of Industry
  - Energy Management Engineering
  - Industrial Management Engineering
  - Environmental Engineering
  - Construction Engineering
  - Architecture ＆Urban Studies
  - Sports Management
  - Smart IT Convergence Engineering
  - Clinical Nursing
  - International Business English
- Graduate School of Education
  - Educational Administration
  - Counselor Education
  - Korean Language Education
  - English Language Education
  - Japanese Language Education
  - Chinese Language Education
  - History Education
  - Museum & Arts Education
  - Ethics Education
  - Social Science Education
  - Early Childhood Education
  - Mathematics Education
  - Physical Education
  - Chemistry Education
  - Biology Education
  - Physical Education
  - Home Economics Education
  - Computer Education
  - Nutrition Education
- Institute of e-Vehicle Technology (was created in 2004 with the support of city of Ulsan and the Korean government.)
  - Vehicle Design
  - Vehicle Manufacturing
  - IT/Mechatronics

=== World rankings ===
University rankings
QS National	General	23
THE National	General	14–17
ARWU National	Research	14–18
QS Asia (Asia version)	General	=210
THE Asia (Asia version)	General	116
USNWR Asia	General	=216
ARWU World	Research	601–700
QS World	General	751–760
THE World	General	501–600
USNWR World	General	=743

== Research Institutes ==
A majority of colleges at the University of Ulsan have individual research institutes. The aim of these institutes is to promote research into various academic fields and to publish relevant findings resulting from these investigations. The research institutes provide a link for cooperation between the university, the industry, and the private and public sectors. The University of Ulsan has 15 research institutes.

== Presidents ==
- Dr. Kwan Lee, March 1, 1985 - March 15, 1988
- Dr. Sang-Ju Lee, March 16, 1988 - February 28, 1996
- Dr. Bon-Ho Koo, March 1, 1996 - March 9, 2000
- Dr. Moo-Ki Bai, March 10, 2000 - June 30, 2003
- Dr. Chung-Kil Chung, July 1, 2003 - June 23, 2008
- Dr. Do-Yeon Kim, September 10, 2008 - March 10, 2011
- Dr. Cheol Lee, March 11, 2011 – February 28, 2015
- Dr. Yeon-Cheon Oh, March 1, 2015 – Present
