= Gwangju University =

Korean university

Coordinates: 35.1063°N 126.8951°E

- Hangul: 광주대학교
- Hanja: 光州大學校
- RR: Gwangju daehakgyo
- MR: Kwangju taehakkyo

Gwangju University (Korean: 광주대학교) is a university in Gwangju, South Korea.

It began in 1981 as a four-year college in Jinwol-dong, Nam-gu, Gwangju, named Gwangju Gyeongsang Jeonmun Daehak (광주경상전문대학).

It now has three graduate schools and four colleges with more than fifteen thousand students.

== Notable people ==
- Kim Na-woon, actress
- K.J. Choi, professional golfer
- Cho Gue-sung, professional football player
