= Chosun University =

Private university in Gwangju, South Korea

- 조선대학교
- Motto: 개성교육·창의교육·영재교육
- Motto in English: Character Education, Practical Education, Specific Education for Talented Students
- Type: Private
- Established: September 9, 1946
- President: Kim, Chun-Sung (18th)
- Academic staff: 839 (2015)
- Students: 32,850 (2015)
- Undergraduates: 29,690 (2015)
- Postgraduates: 3,160 (2015)
- Location: (South Korea) Gwangju, South Korea; 35°8′32″N 126°55′59″E
- Campus: Urban
- Colors: Blue
- Mascot: Crane
- Website: eng.chosun.ac.kr

- Chosun University
- Hangul: 조선대학교
- Hanja: 朝鮮大學校
- RR: Joseon daehakgyo
- MR: Chosŏn taehakkyo

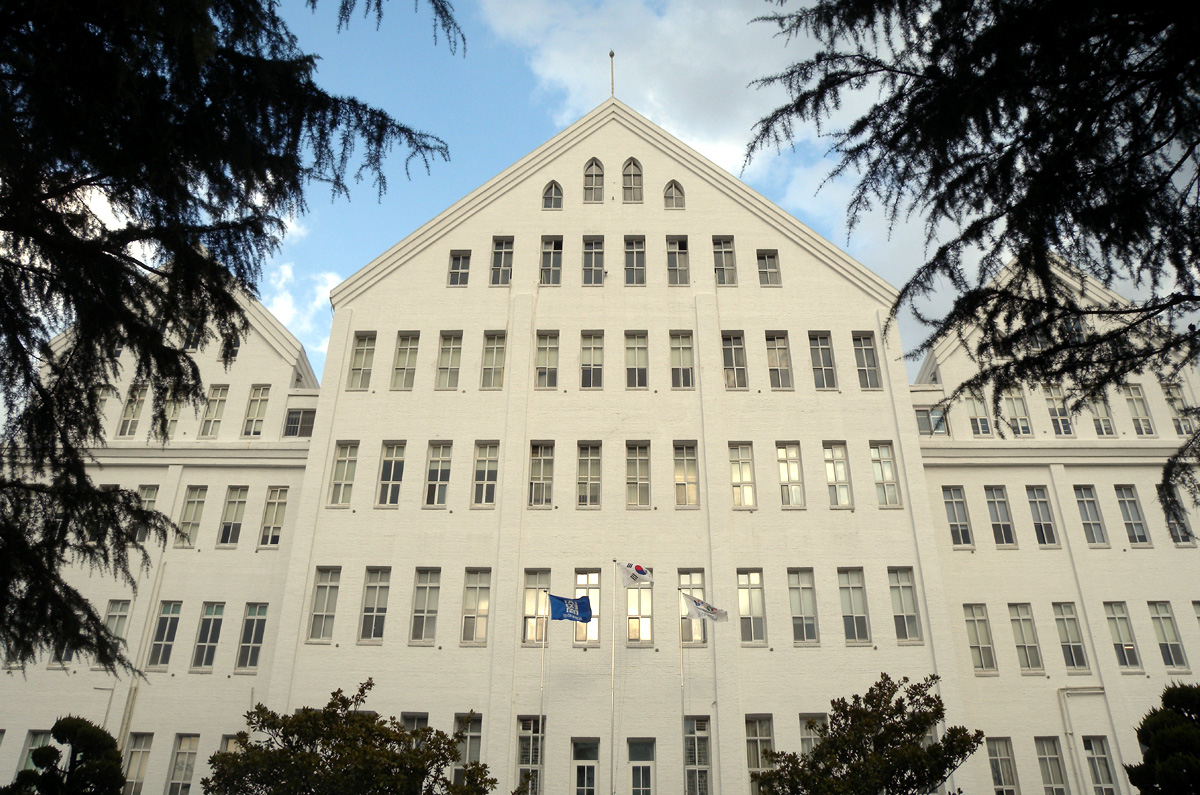
Chosun University Main Building 2

Chosun University (Korean: 조선대학교) is one of the oldest private universities in South Korea. Its campus is situated in Gwangju metropolitan city, in southwestern South Korea. Around 33,000 students are enrolled.

== Academics ==
Undergraduate courses are offered through the university's 16 Colleges: General Education, Humanities, Natural Sciences, Law, Social Sciences, Business, Engineering, Electronics and Information Engineering, Education, Foreign Studies, Physical Education, Art and Design, Medicine, Dentistry, Pharmacy and Natural Medical Sciences. Graduate courses, which cover most of these same areas, are offered through the various departments of the Graduate School.

== History ==
Chosun University was founded by the Chosun College Founders' Association. The Association was formed in May 1946, and rapidly gained members throughout Chungcheong, Jeolla, and Jeju provinces. According to the school website, "membership rose to more than 72,000 by the end of 1947." The first classes of the school, then called Kwangju Evening Academy, were held on September 29, 1946. It was renamed Chosun Academy shortly thereafter, and became a college in 1948. It became a university at the beginning of the 1953 school year, at which time the graduate school was also established.

== Sister schools ==
Chosun University maintains sisterhood ties with a large number of institutions: 70 internationally, and 42 domestically. Countries involved include Australia, China, Colombia, Egypt, Germany, India, Indonesia, Japan, Mexico, Nepal, the Netherlands, New Zealand, Russia, Taiwan, Thailand, the United States, Kenya and Vietnam.

== Annual event ==
Chosun University has a variety of annual events, including rose festivals and grand festivals. On May 23, 2003, a rose festival will be held every May in the name of the rose festival - the scent of white rose. During the ceremony, there will be celebration performances and experience events such as performances by famous singers, colleges and clubs, Making book with roses, and origami of roses are held, and digital photo contest and rose garden photo exhibition are held.

== Notable people ==
- Byun Hee-bong, actor
- Lee Han-wi, actor
- Ryu Tae-joon, actor
- Yoon Seung-ah, actor
- Lee Han-wi, actor
- Jang Ja-yeon, actor
- Hong Jin-young, singer
- Hong Jeong-ho, football player
- Kim Dong-woo, football player
- Kim Hyo-gi, football player
- Kim Joo-sung, a former football player
- Kim Hyo-gi, a female South Korean archer and Olympic champion
- Kim Joo-sung, president of East Asian Football Federation

== See also ==
- List of colleges and universities in South Korea
- Education in South Korea
