= Asan station =

Station of the Seoul Metropolitan Subway

아산 (선문대)
Asan
(Sun Moon Univ.)
| 아산 (선문대); Asan (Sun Moon Univ.) |
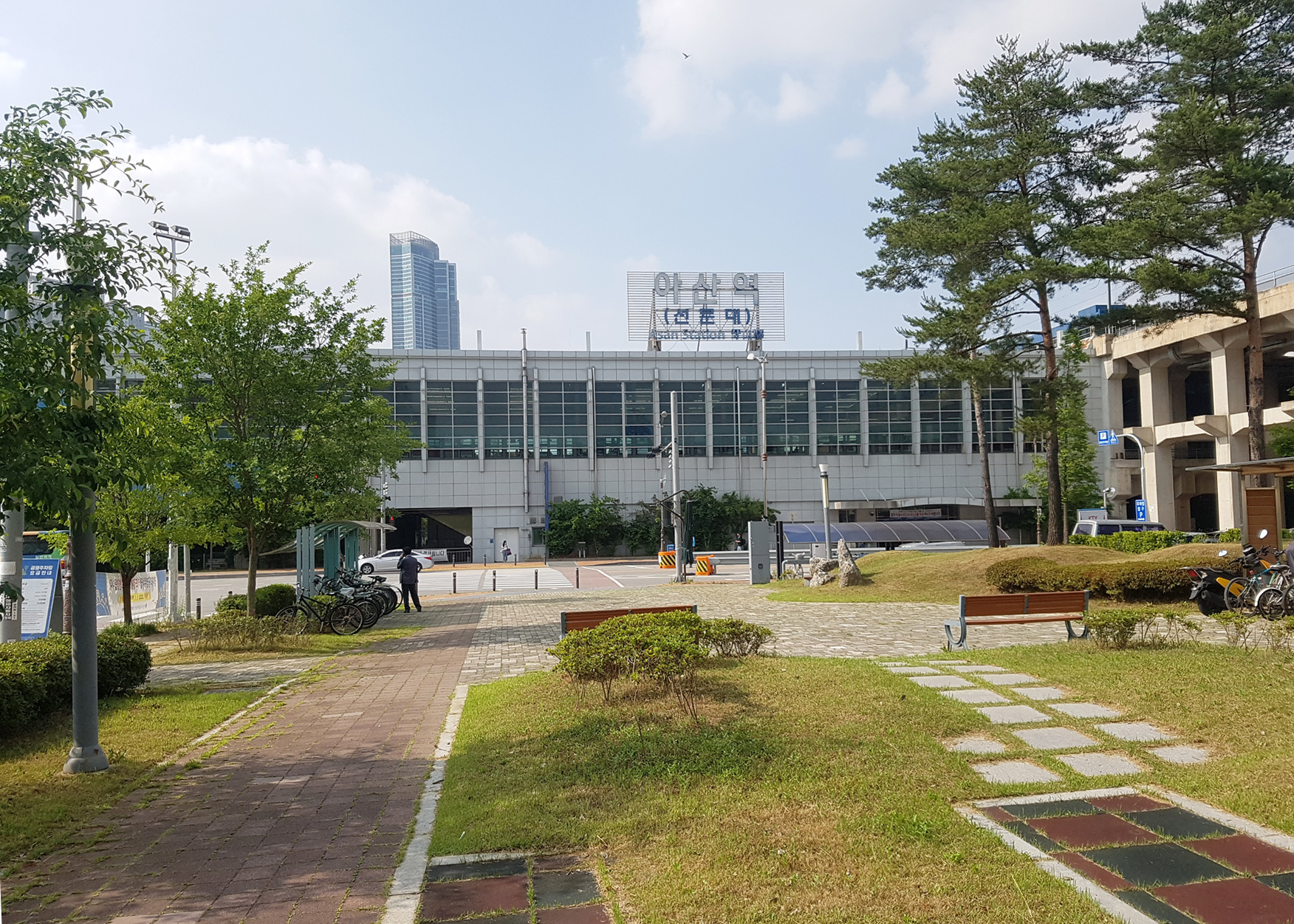
- Station building

Korean name
- Hangul: 아산역
- Hanja: 牙山驛
- Revised Romanization: Asannyeok
- McCune–Reischauer: Asannyŏk

General information
- Location: 419-1 Jangjaeri, Baebang-eup, Asan-si, Chungcheongnam-do
- Coordinates: 36.7920°N 127.1044°E
- Operator: Korail
- Line: Janghang Line
- Platforms: 2
- Tracks: 4
- Connections: Cheonan–Asan station

Construction
- Structure type: Aboveground

History
- Opened: March 30, 2007

Key dates
- December 15, 2008: Line 1 started service

Passengers
- (Daily) Based on Jan-Dec of 2012. KR: 3,011; Line 1: 4,190

Services
| Preceding station | Seoul Metropolitan Subway | Following station |
|---|---|---|
| Ssangyong towards Kwangwoon University | Line 1 | Tangjeong towards Sinchang |
| Ssangyong towards Cheongnyangni or Seoul | Line 1 Gyeongbu Express | Tangjeong towards Sinchang |
| Preceding station | Korail | Following station |
| Cheonan towards Yongsan | ITX-Maum Janghang Line | Onyangoncheon towards Hongseong |
| Cheonan Next counterclockwise | ITX-Maum Pyeongtaek Line | Onyangoncheon Next clockwise |
| Cheonan towards Yongsan | Saemaeul-ho Janghang Line | Onyangoncheon towards Iksan |
| Cheonan towards Yongsan | Mugunghwa-ho Janghang Line | Onyangoncheon towards Iksan |
| Cheonan towards Yongsan | G-Train | Yesan towards Iksan |
Location

Asan Station is a railway station on the Janghang Line which is also served by Line 1 of the Seoul Subway. Its located in Baebang-eup, Asan, South Chungcheong Province, South Korea. Meanwhile, is served by all Saemaeul-ho and Mugunghwa-ho services on the Janghang Line.

It is connected to (and it is possible to transfer to trains which stop at) Cheonan–Asan station, a KTX railway station which is also served by Gyeongbu KTX and Honam KTX.

== History ==
Asan station was opened on March 30, 2007, to facilitate access to the KTX station.

== Station layout ==
| L2; Platforms | Southbound | Line 1 toward Sinchang (Tangjeong) → |
| L2; Platforms | Island platform, doors will open on the right |
| L2; Platforms | Southbound | Mugunghwa-ho toward Iksan (Onyangoncheon) → |
| L2; Platforms | Northbound | ← Mugunghwa-ho toward Yongsan (Cheonan) |
| L2; Platforms | Island platform, doors will open on the right |
| L2; Platforms | Northbound | ← Line 1 toward Kwangwoon University (Ssangyong) |

| L1; Concourse | Lobby | Customer Service, Shops, Vending machines, ATMs |

| G | Exit |

== Gallery ==
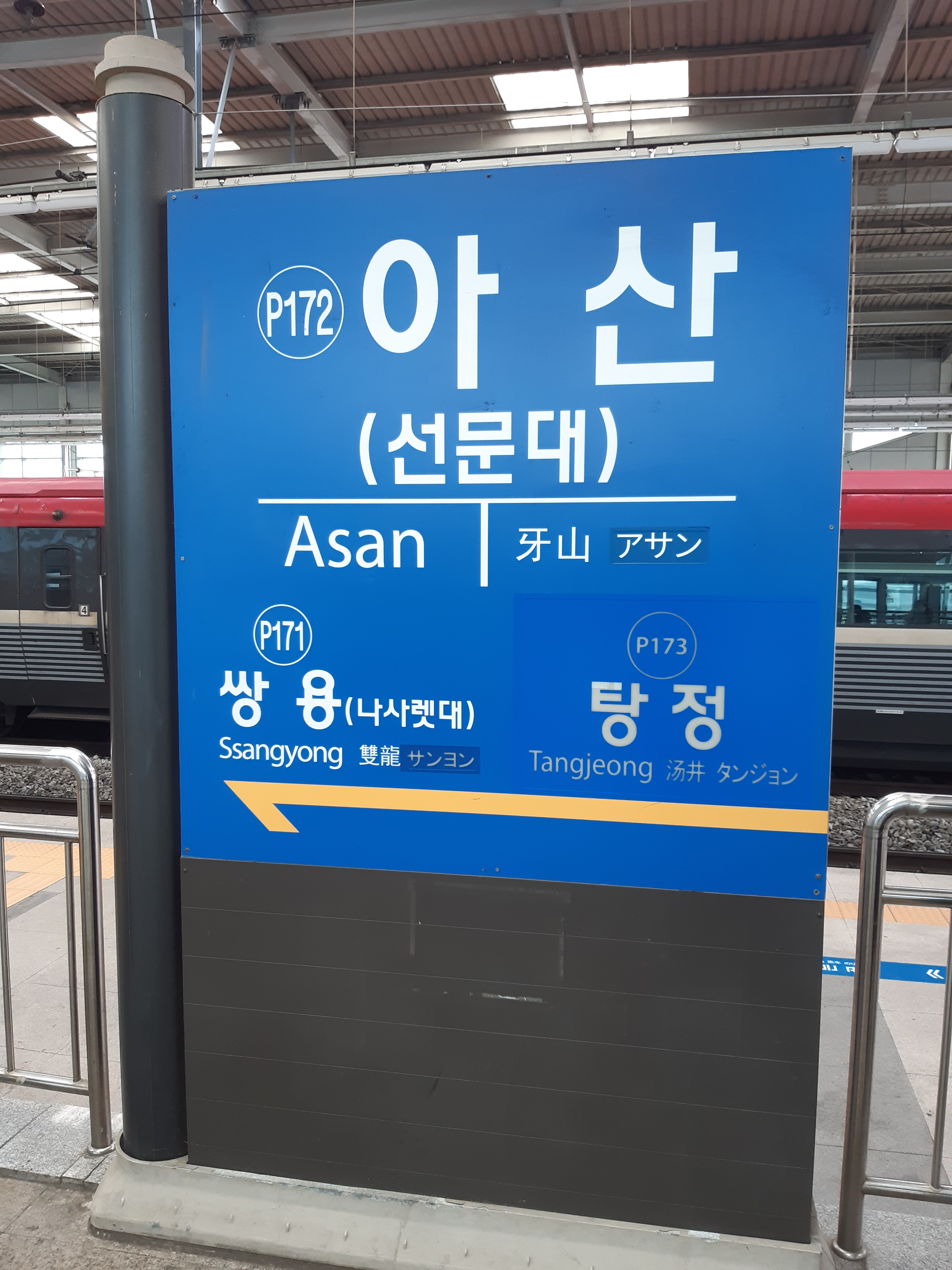
Asan station stand (Line 1)

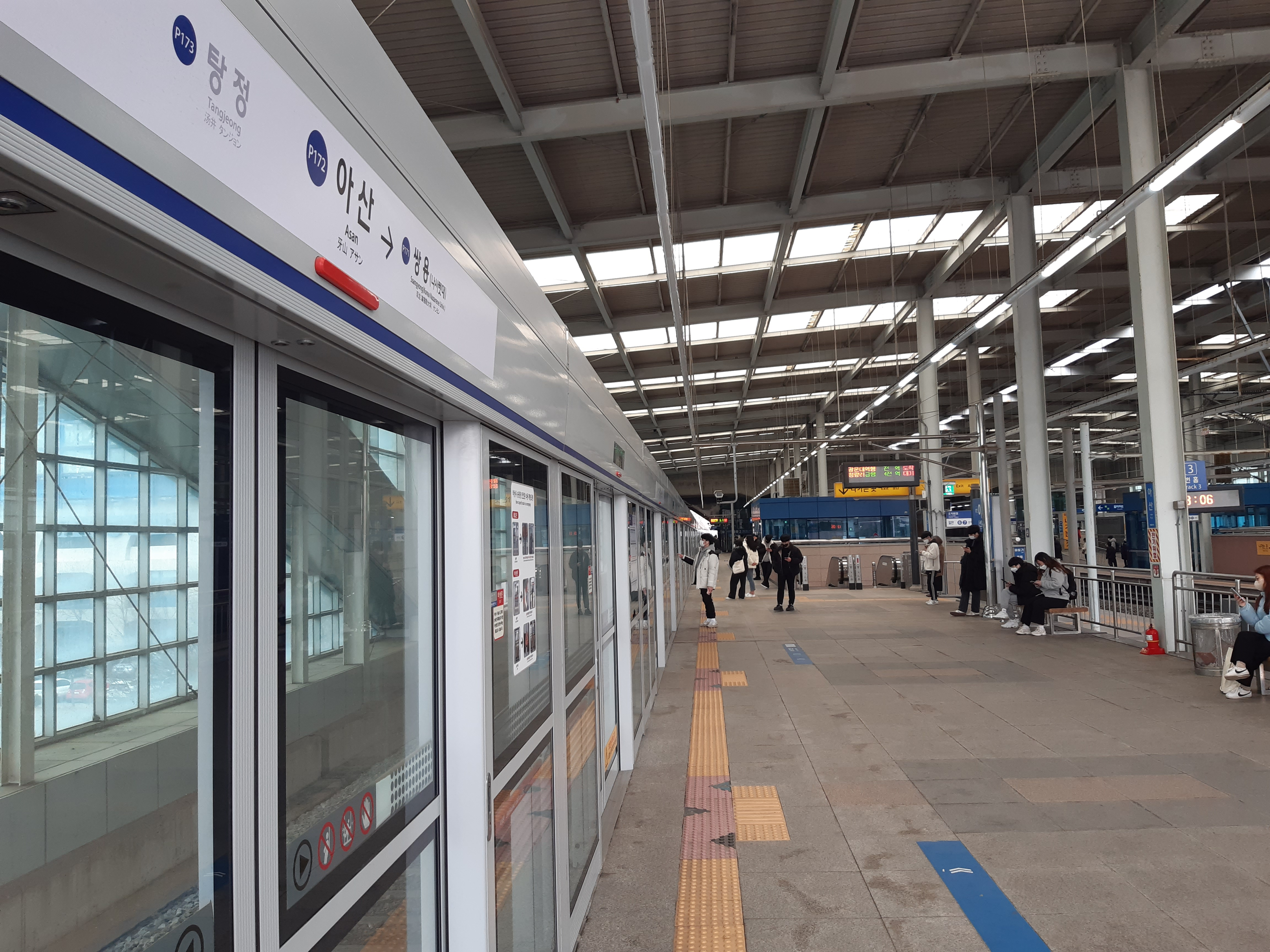
Station platform (Line 1)
