= Onyang-dong =

- Dong
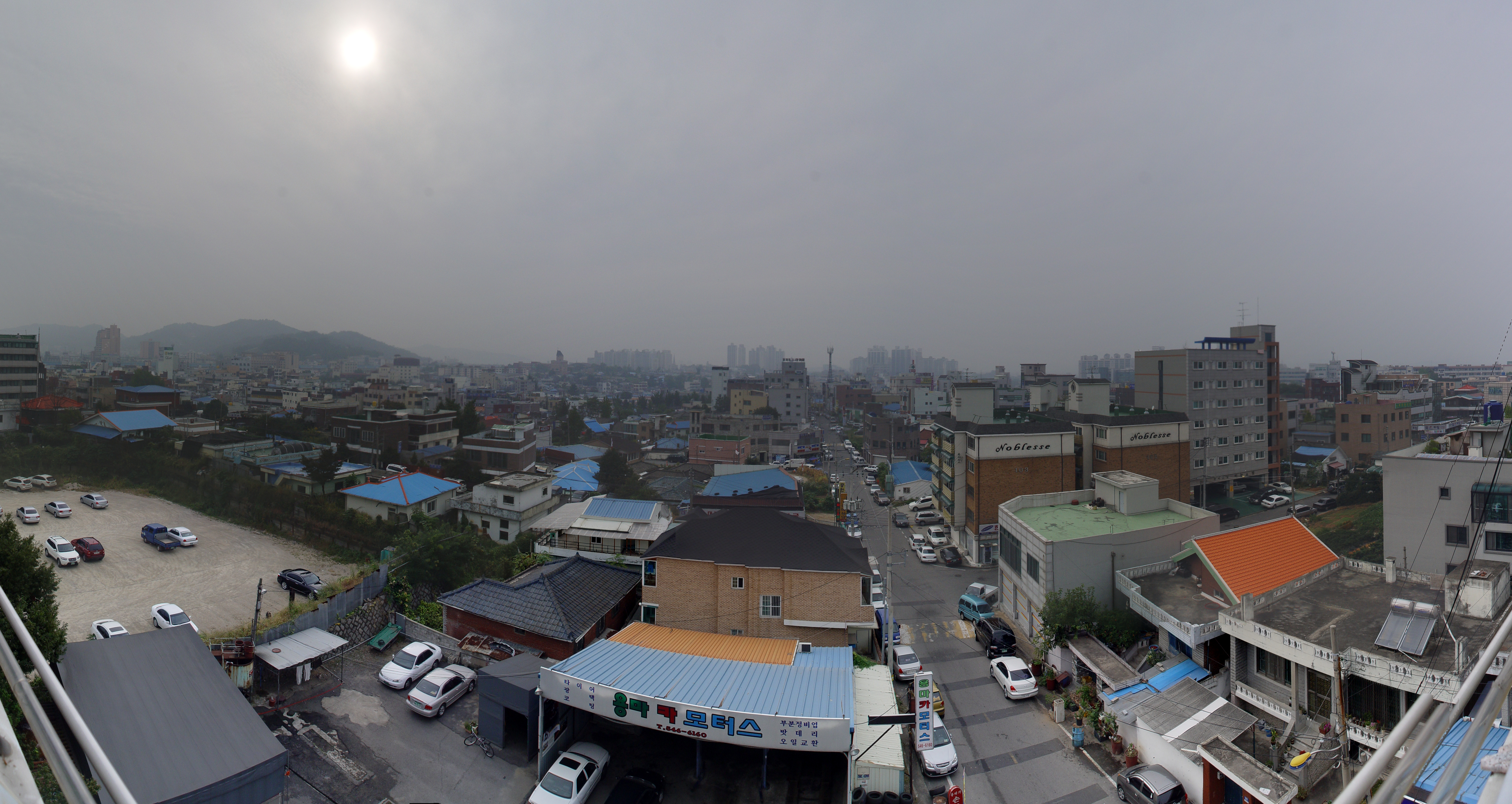
- Panorama of Onyang

- Location in South Korea
- Coordinates: 36°46′58″N 127°00′17″E
- Country: South Korea
- Region: Hoseo
- Administrative divisions: 6 dong

Area
  - Total: 44.61 km^{2} (17.22 sq mi)

Population (2005)
  - Total: 93,419
  - Density: 2,094.1/km^{2} (5,424/sq mi)
  - Dialect: Chungcheong

Korean name
- Hangul: 온양동
- Hanja: 溫陽洞
- RR: Onyang-dong
- MR: Onyang-dong

Onyang-dong (Korean: 온양동), actually a series of six dong, is the central and most populous part of the city of Asan in Chungcheongnam-do, South Korea.

== Geography ==
Onyang-dong lies in the centre of Asan, 10 km south-west of Cheonan. It is bordered by Yeomchi-eup to the north, Sinchang-myeon to the west, Baebang-myeon to the south-east and Tangjeong-myeon to the north-east.

Onyang-dong's northern border is the Gokgyo-cheon, a stream which flows west to join the Samgyo-cheon before emptying into Asan Bay, while Sinjeong-ho, a small reservoir, lies to the south-west.

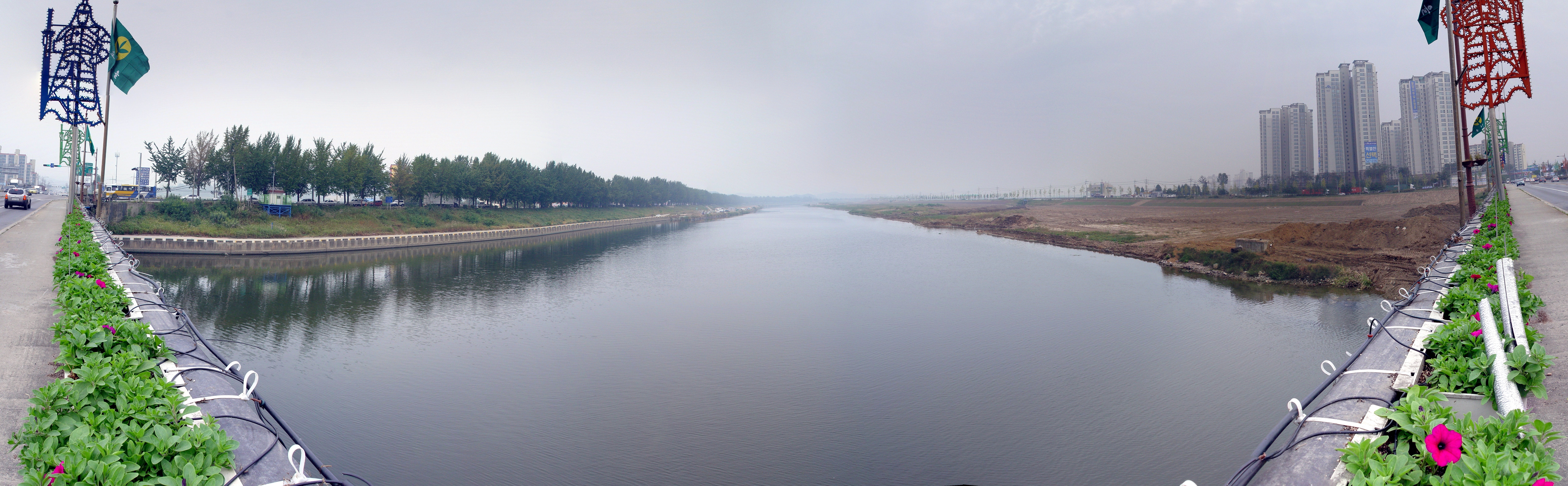
The Gokgyocheon

== Demographics ==
50.2% of the population are male and 49.8% female, with only 0.75% of the population being foreign. There are 35086 registered residences, making the average household consist of 2.7 people and the population density is 2094 people per square kilometre, the total area of the six dong being 44.6 km^{2}.

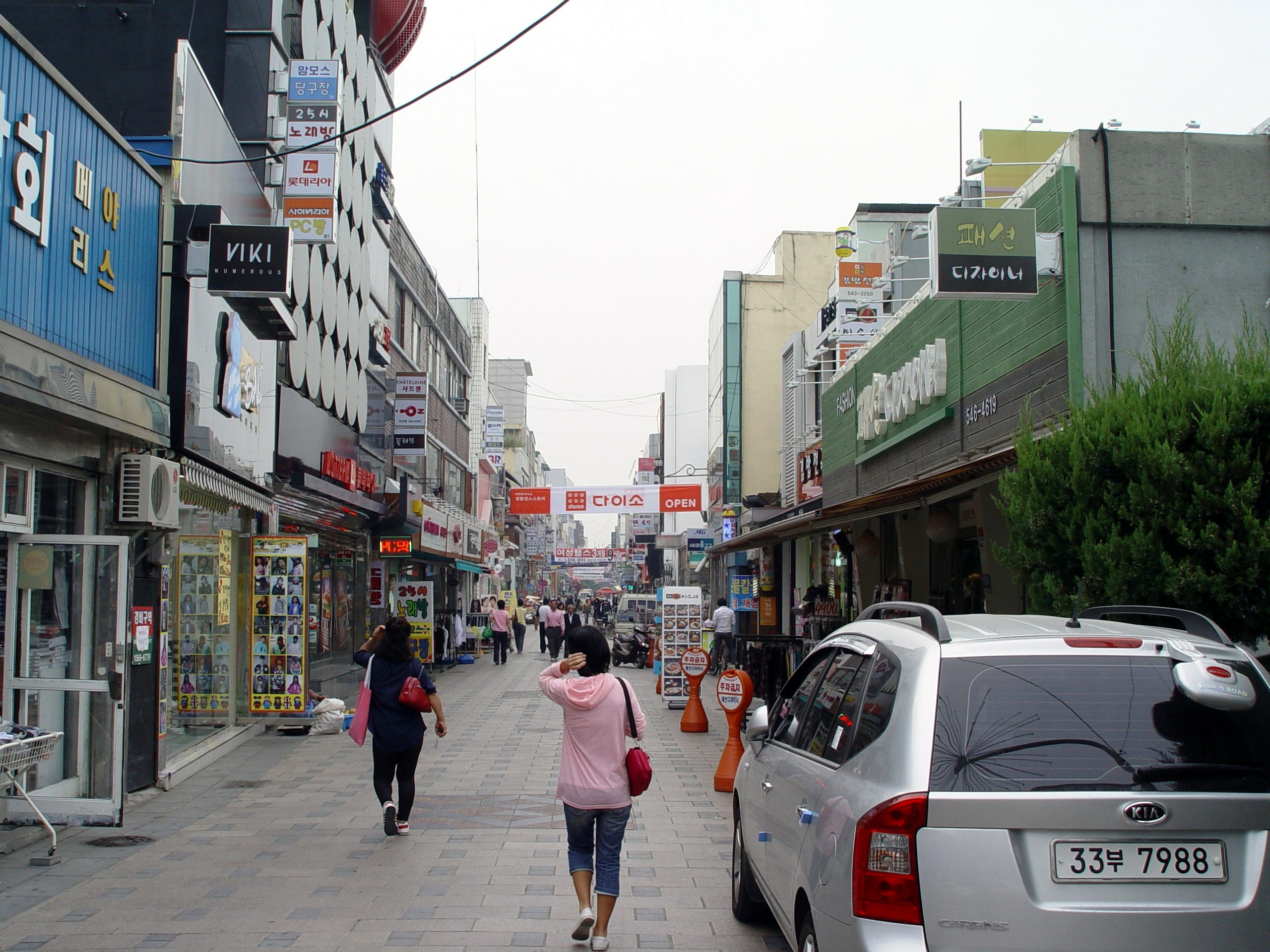
Pedestrianised street in central Onyang

== Administrative divisions ==
The administrative "dong" (wards) of Onyang-dong are as follow.

- Onyang-1-dong (Hangul: 온양1동)
- Onyang-2-dong (Hangul: 온양2동)
- Onyang-3-dong (Hangul: 온양3동)
- Onyang-4-dong (Hangul: 온양4동)
- Onyang-5-dong (Hangul: 온양5동)
- Onyang-6-dong (Hangul: 온양6동)

== Transportation ==
Onyang is served by its railway station, named Onyang Oncheon, by Asan Bus Terminal, and by a range of local buses. The station serves trains on the Janghang Line (from Cheonan to Iksan and also has services on Line 1 of the Seoul Metropolitan Subway.

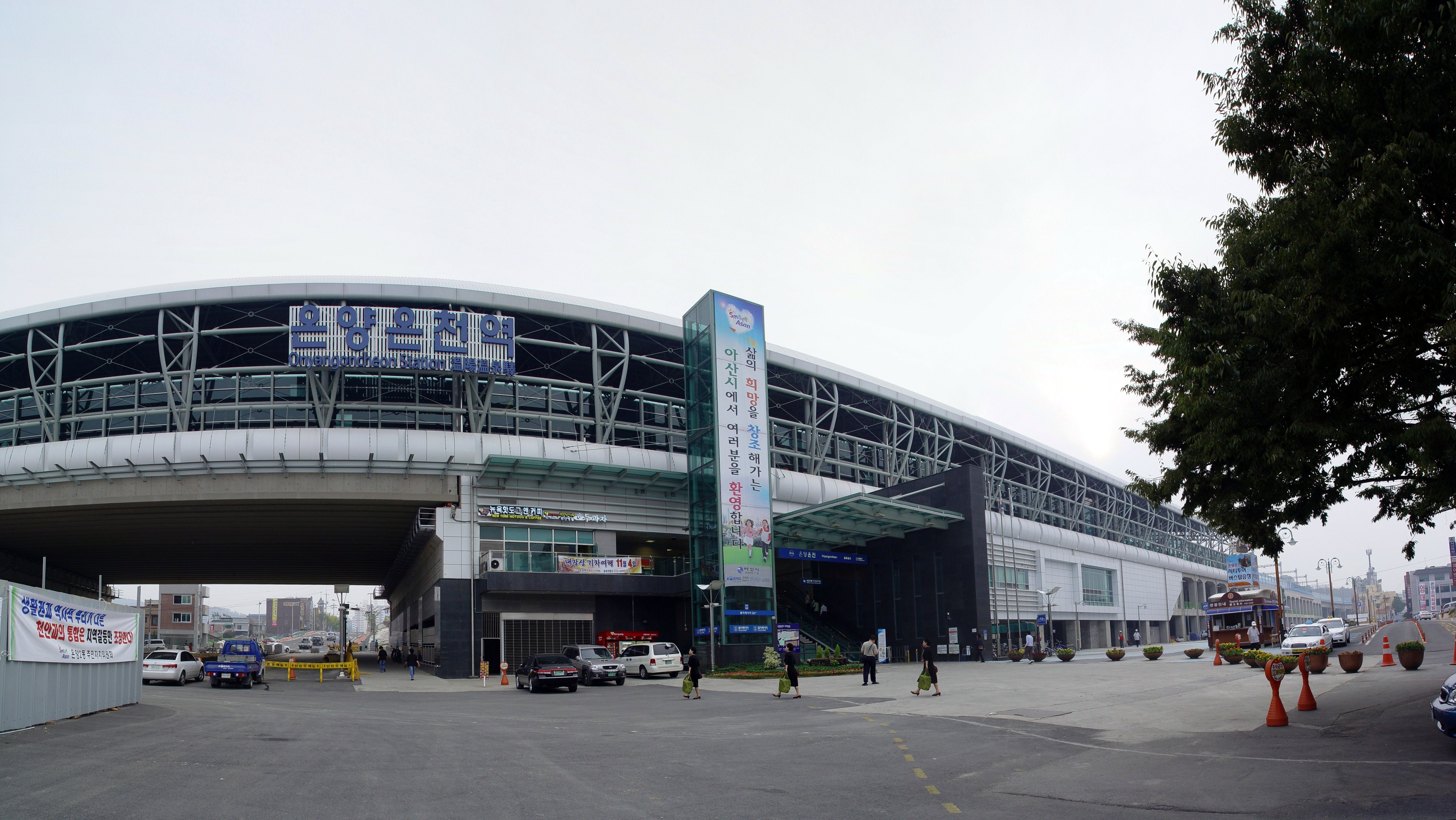
Onyang Oncheon Station

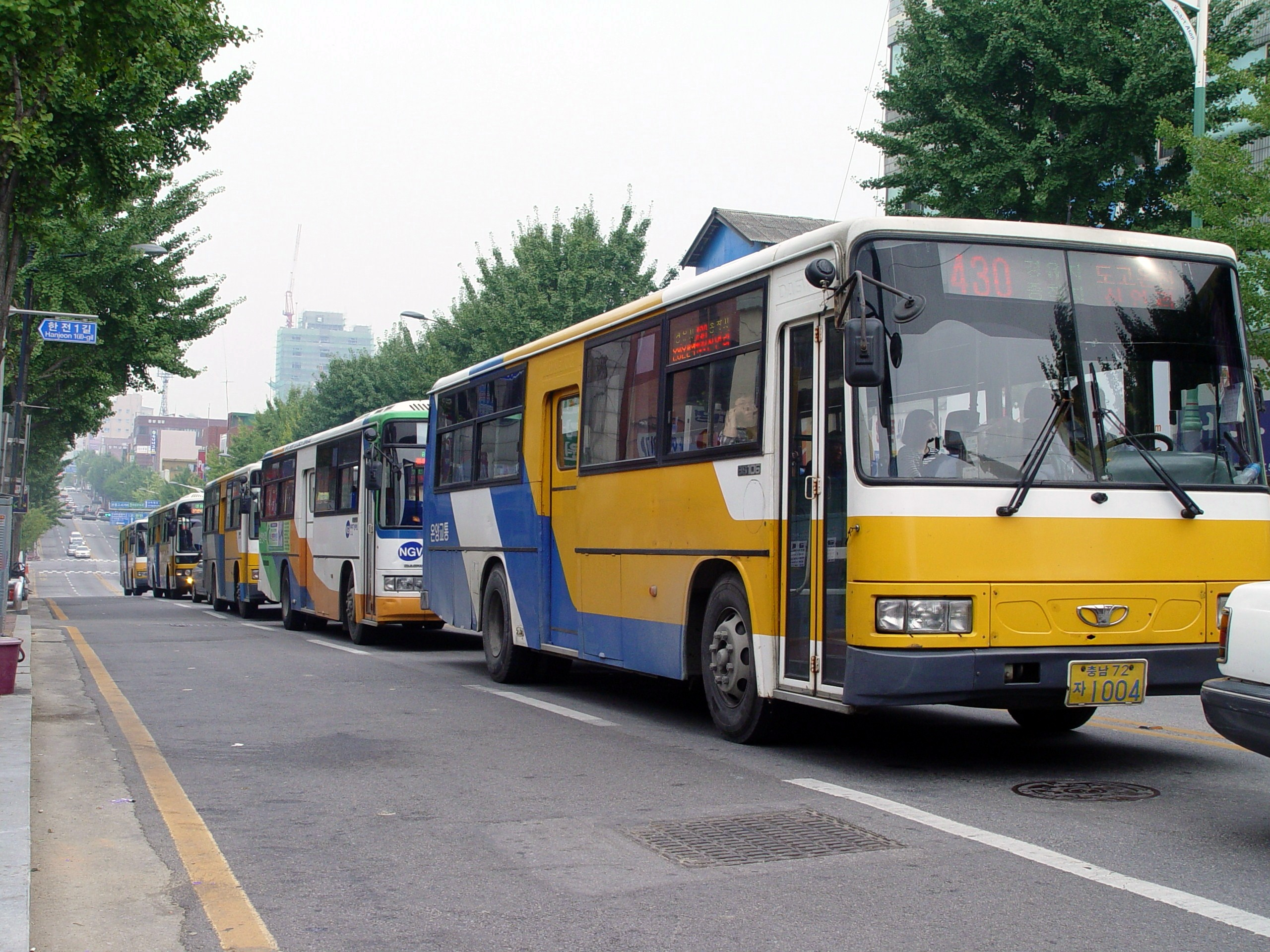
Local buses in Onyang

== See also ==
- Asan
- Chungcheongnam-do
