= Baebang station =

Station of the Seoul Metropolitan Subway

배방; Baebang
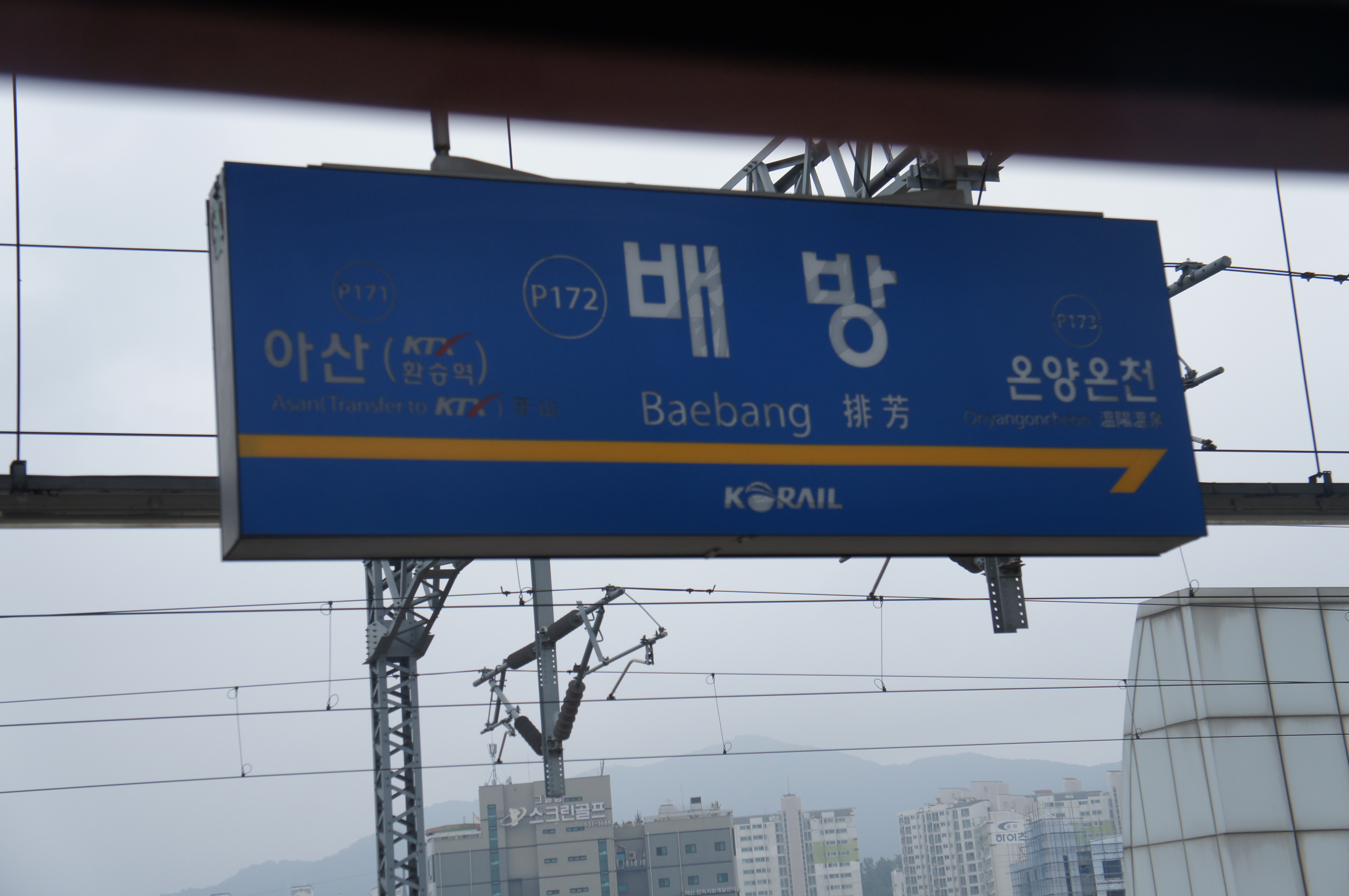

Korean name
- Hangul: 배방역
- Hanja: 排芳驛
- RR: Baebang-yeok
- MR: Paebang-yŏk

General information
- Location: 159-17 Guryongni, 1967 Oncheondaero, Baebang-eup, Asan-si, Chungcheongnam-do
- Coordinates: 36°46′40″N 127°03′11″E
- Operator: Korail
- Line: Janghang Line
- Platforms: 2
- Tracks: 4

Construction
- Structure type: Aboveground

History
- Opened: June 15, 1922; December 15, 2008

Passengers
- (Daily) Based on Jan-Dec of 2012. Line 1: 1,637

Services
Preceding station	Seoul Metropolitan Subway	Following station
Tangjeong towards Kwangwoon University	Line 1	Onyangoncheon towards Sinchang
Tangjeong towards Cheongnyangni or Seoul	Line 1 Gyeongbu Express	Onyangoncheon towards Sinchang
Location

Baebang Station is a railway station on Seoul Metropolitan Subway Line 1 and the Janghang Line in Asan, South Korea.

The station was first opened as Mosan Station (모산역; 毛山驛), an unstaffed simple station, on June 1, 1922, during the Japanese colonial era. In 1926 it became a regular station, in 1950 it was downgraded to an unstaffed station, one year later it became a regular station again. In 1986 it underwent reconstruction. In 1997, it became a staffed simple station. On March 30, 2007, it was relocated and renamed to Baebang station. Finally on December 15, 2008, it began operations.
