= Tangjeong station =

Station of the Seoul Metropolitan Subway

| 탕정; Tangjeong |
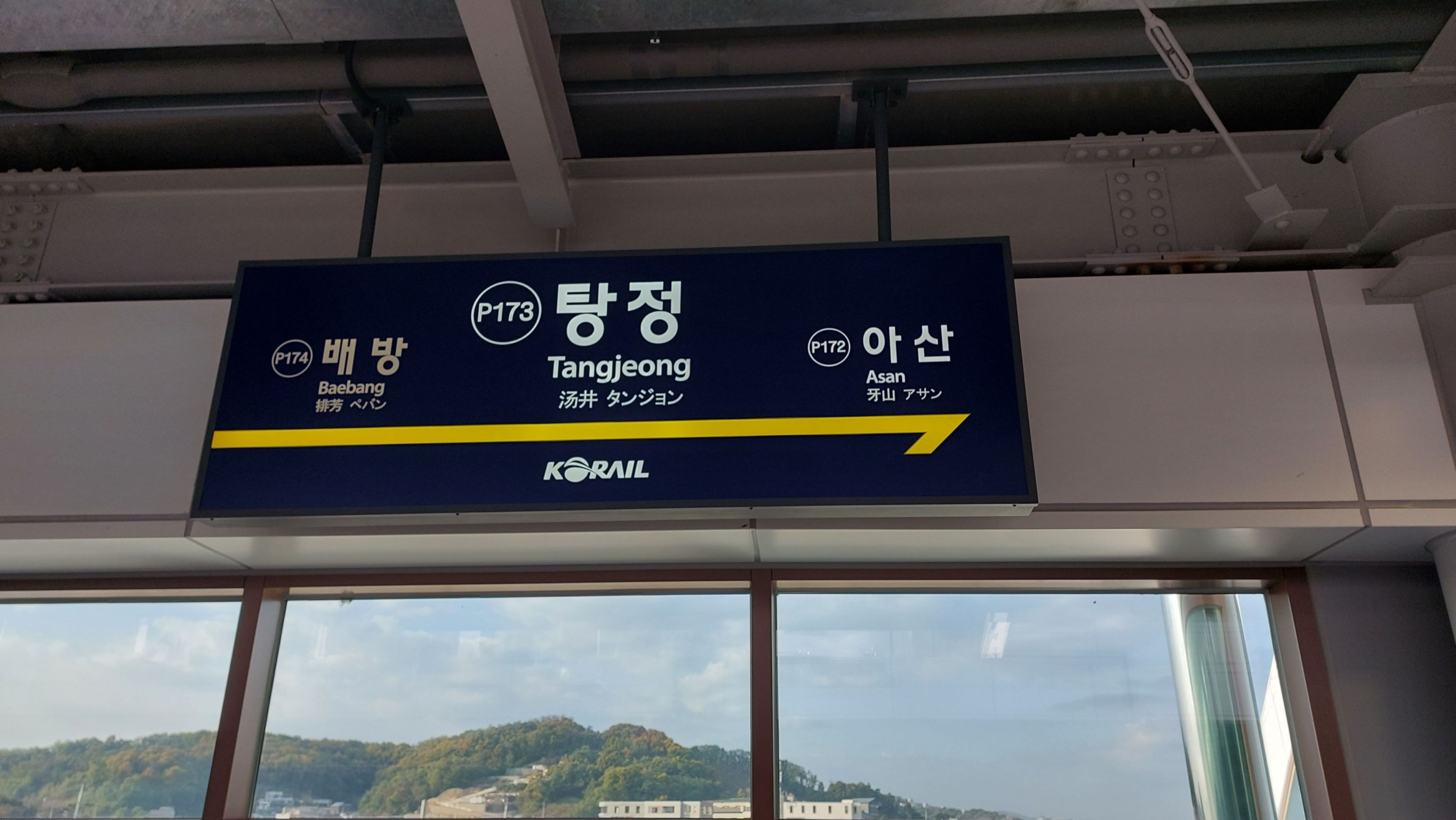
- Station nameplate

Korean name
- Hangul: 탕정역
- Hanja: 湯井驛
- RR: Tangjeong-yeok
- MR: T'angjŏng-yŏk

General information
- Location: 472-8 Maegokri, Tangjeong-myeon, Asan-si, Chungcheongnam-do; South Korea
- Operator: Korail
- Line: Janghang Line
- Platforms: 2
- Tracks: 4

Construction
- Structure type: Aboveground

History
- Opened: October 30, 2021

Services
| Preceding station | Seoul Metropolitan Subway | Following station |
|---|---|---|
| Asan towards Kwangwoon University | Line 1 | Baebang towards Sinchang |
| Asan towards Cheongnyangni or Seoul | Line 1 Gyeongbu Express | Baebang towards Sinchang |
Location

Tangjeong Station (Korean: 탕정역) is a railway station on Janghang Line of the Seoul Metropolitan Subway system. Work on the station began in October 2018 and it opened on October 30, 2021.

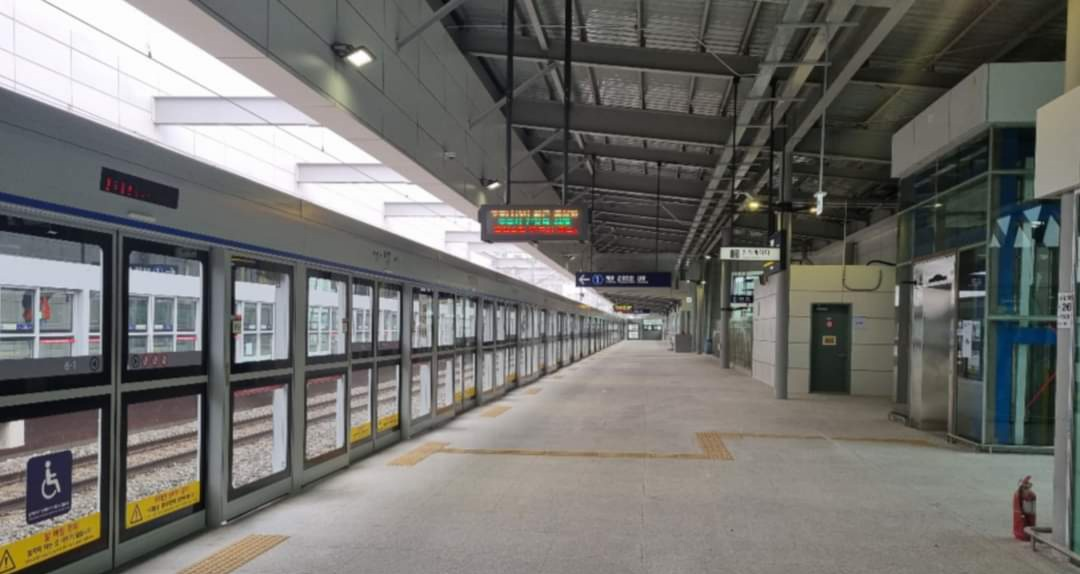
Station platform
