= Port of Janghang =

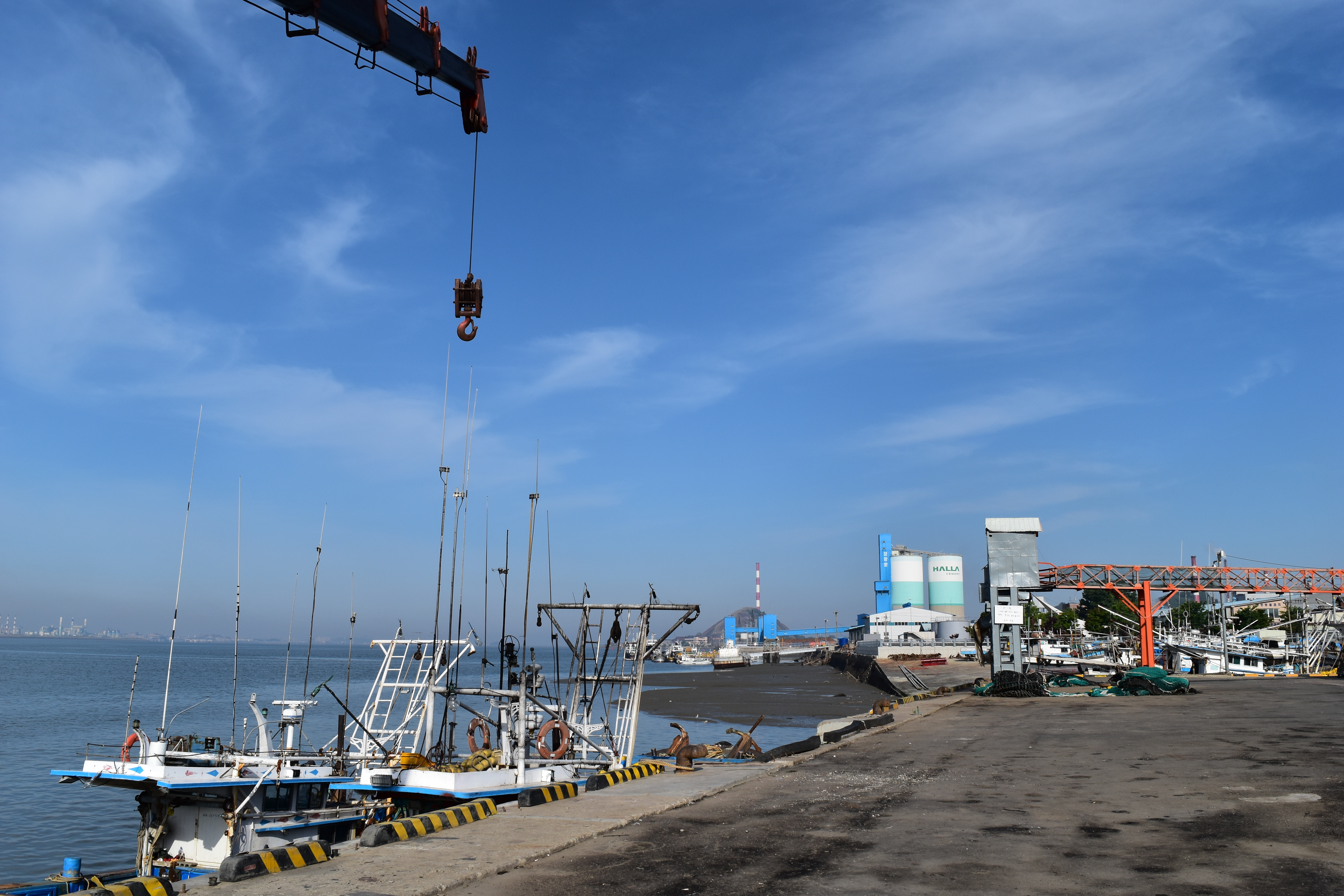
- Click on the map for a fullscreen view

Location
- Country: South Korea
- Location: Seocheon
- Coordinates: 36°N 126.7°E
- UN/LOCODE: KRCHG

Details
- No. of berths: 4
- Draft depth: 8.4m

The Port of Janghang is a port in South Korea, located in the county of Seocheon.

It is situated at the mouth of the Geum River, at the eastern extremity of the limits of the Port of Gunsan.

== See also ==
- Port of Gunsan
