= Onyangoncheon station =

Railway station in Asan, South Korea

온양온천 (아산현충사)
Onyangoncheon
(Asan Hyeonchungsa)
온양온천 (아산현충사); Onyangoncheon (Asan Hyeonchungsa)
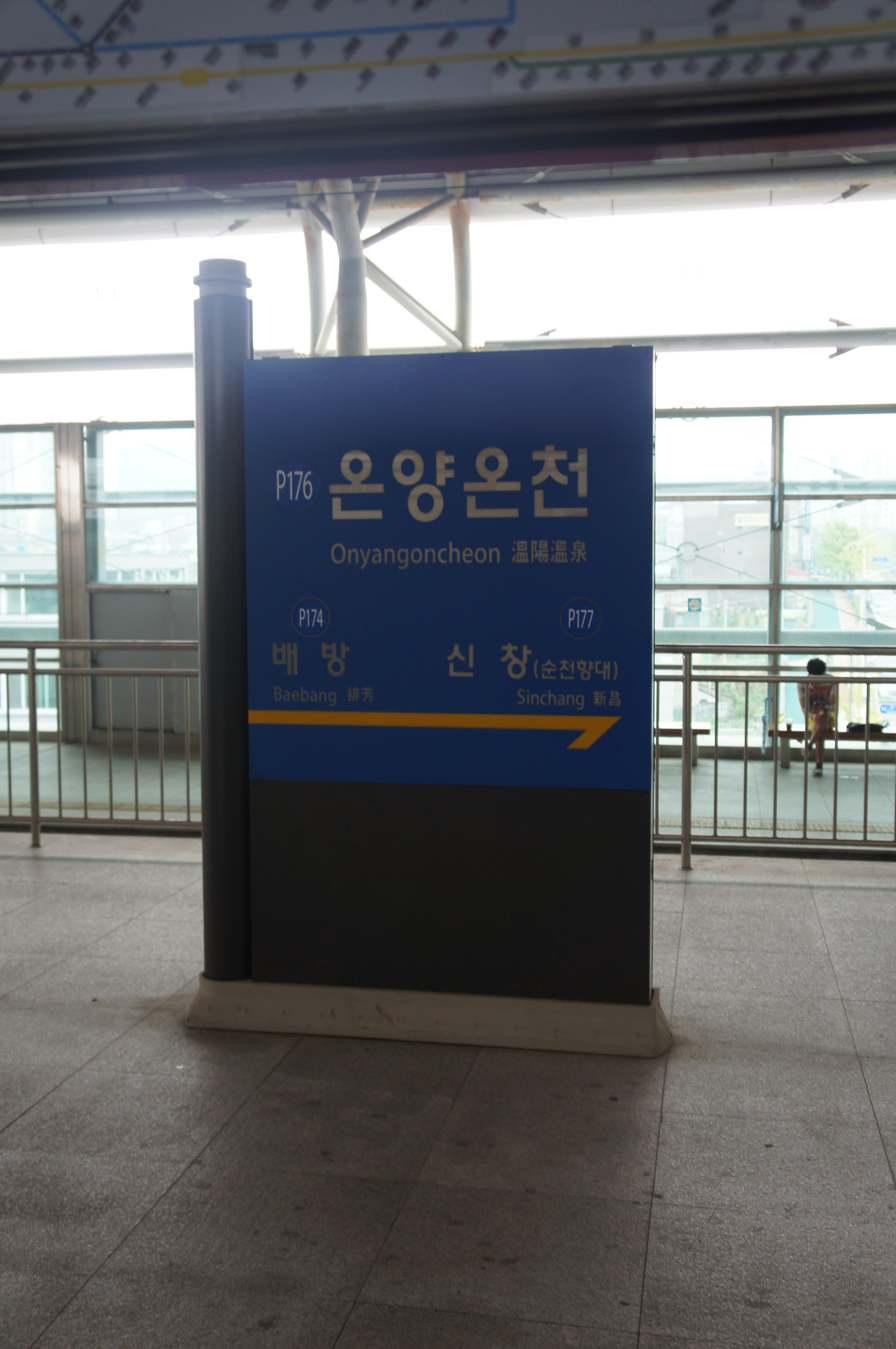

Korean name
- Hangul: 온양온천역
- Hanja: 溫陽溫泉驛
- Revised Romanization: Onyangoncheonnyeok
- McCune–Reischauer: Onyangonch'ŏnnyŏk

General information
- Location: 56-9 Oncheon-dong, 1496; Oncheondaero, Asan-si, Chungcheongnam-do
- Coordinates: 36°46′50″N 127°00′12″E
- Operator: Korail
- Line: Janghang Line
- Platforms: 4
- Tracks: 4

Construction
- Structure type: Aboveground

History
- Opened: June 1, 1922; December 15, 2008

Passengers
- (Daily) Based on Jan-Dec of 2012. KR: 2,999; Line 1: 10,379

Services
Preceding station	Seoul Metropolitan Subway	Following station
Baebang towards Kwangwoon University	Line 1	Sinchang Terminus
Baebang towards Cheongnyangni or Seoul	Line 1 Gyeongbu Express	Sinchang Terminus
Preceding station	Korail	Following station
Asan towards Yongsan	ITX-Maum Janghang Line	Sinchang towards Hongseong
Asan Next counterclockwise	ITX-Maum Pyeongtaek Line	Sillyewon Next clockwise
Asan towards Yongsan	Saemaeul-ho Janghang Line	Sillyewon towards Iksan
Asan towards Yongsan	Mugunghwa-ho Janghang Line	Dogooncheon towards Iksan
Location

Onyangoncheon Station is a railway station on Seoul Metropolitan Subway Line 1 and the Janghang Line in Onyang-dong, Asan, South Korea.

The station is named for the nearby Onyang Hot Springs.

== Gallery ==
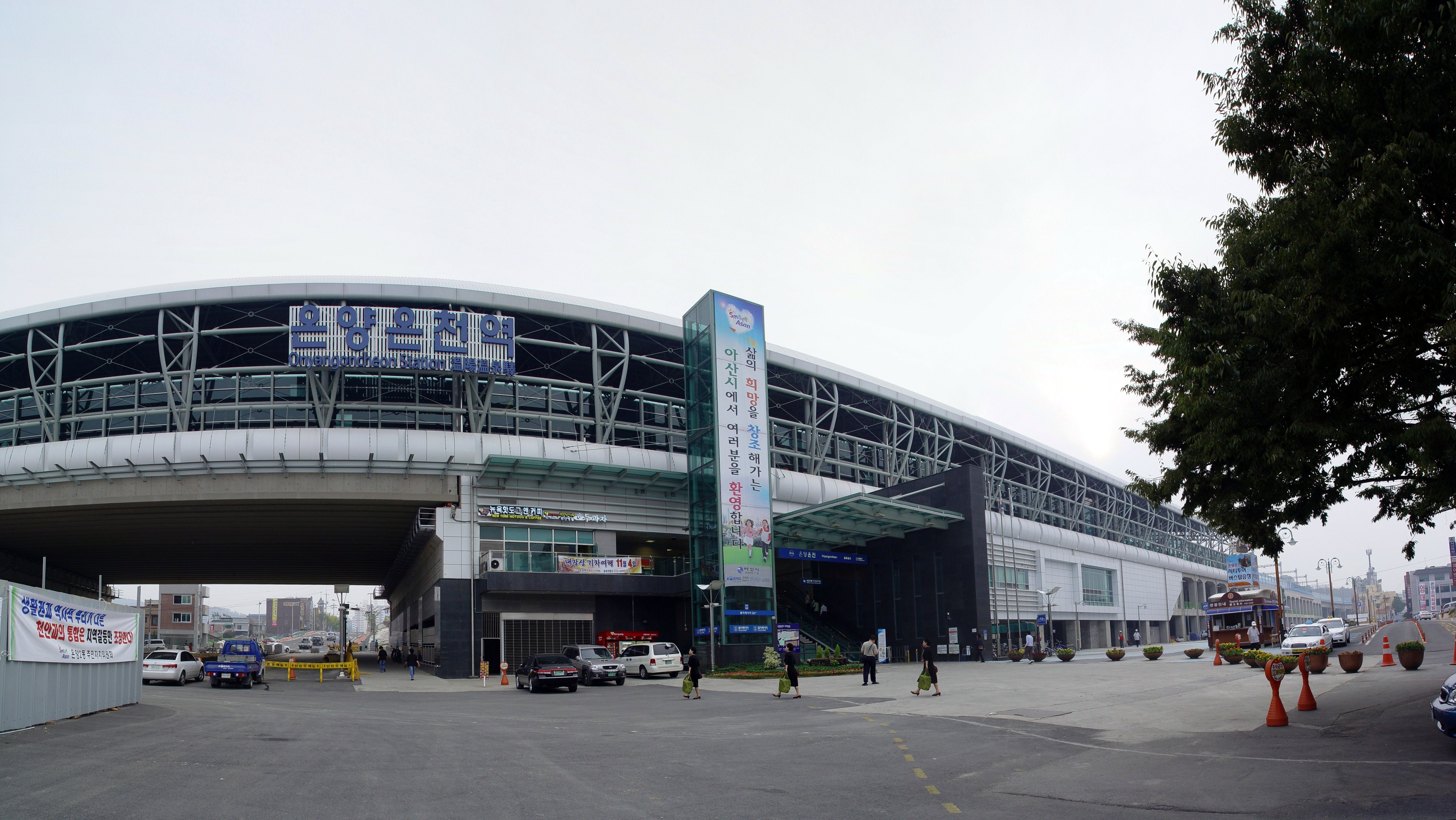
Station Entrance

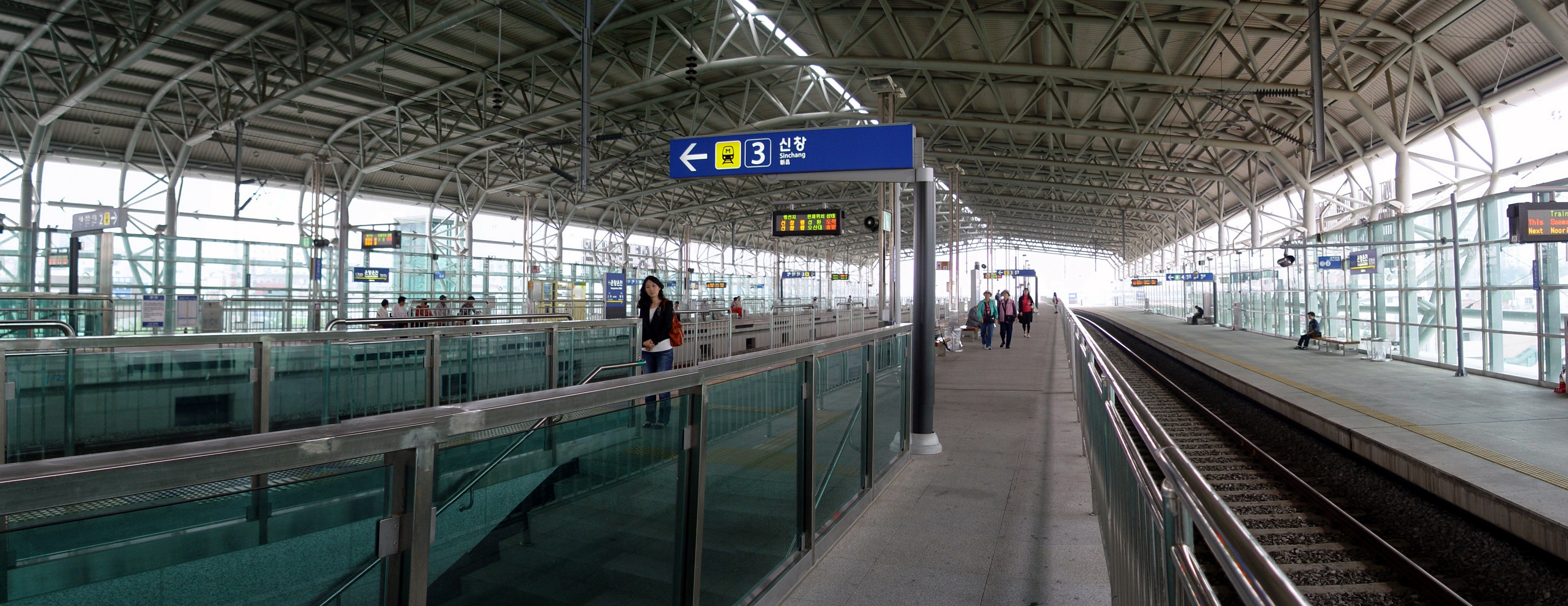
Platforms and Tracks (2009)

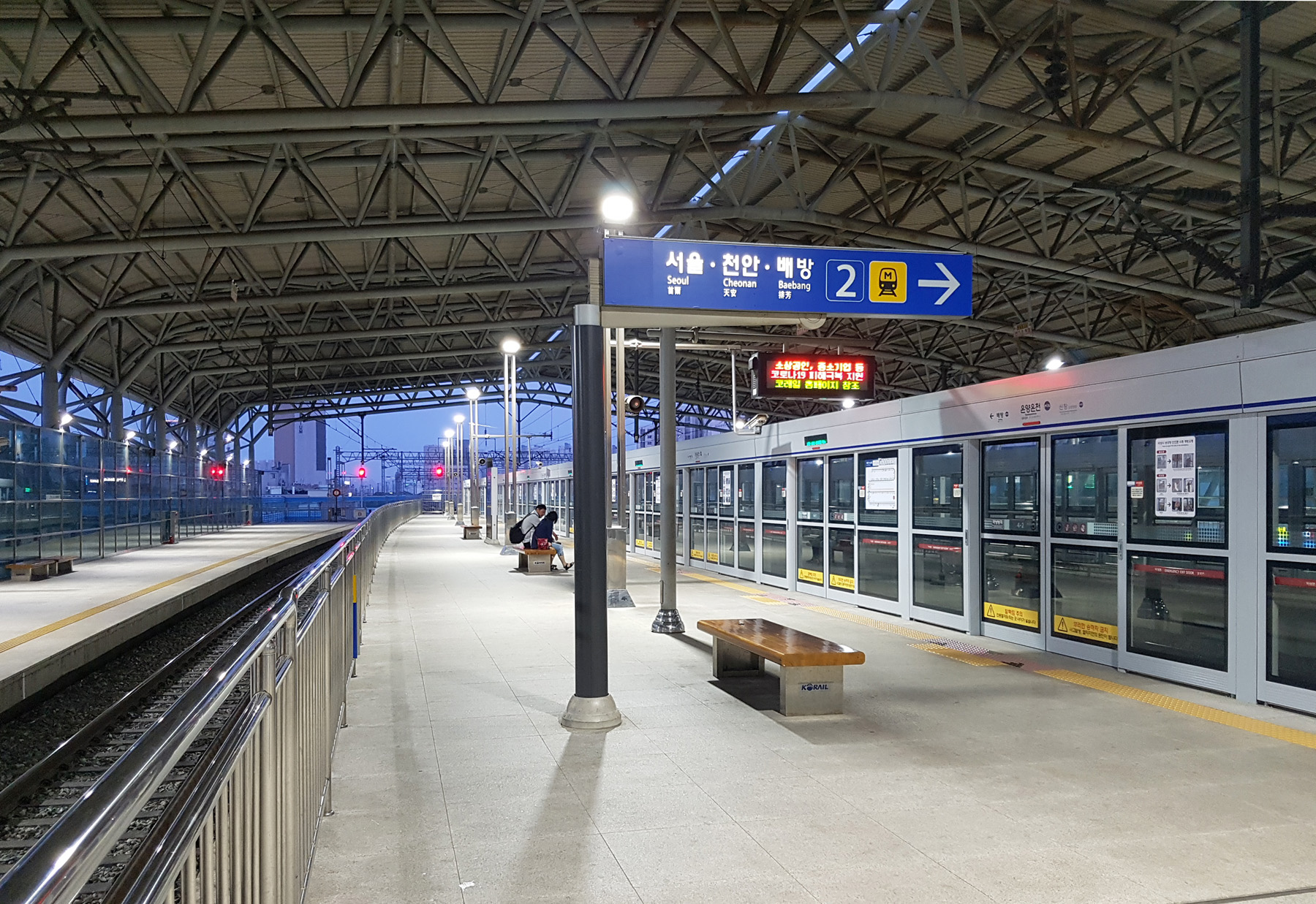
Platforms and Tracks (2020)
