= Chōsen Gyeongnam Railway =

Railway in Japanese-occupied Korea

Overview
- Native name: 조선경남철도주식회사 (Joseon Gyeongnam Cheoldo Jusikhoesa) 朝鮮京南鉄道株式会社 (Chōsen Kyōnan Tetsudō Kabushiki Kaisha)

The Chōsen Gyeongnam Railway (Japanese: 朝鮮京南鉄道株式会社, Chōsen Kyōnan Tetsudō Kabushiki Kaisha; Korean: 조선경남철도주식회사; RR: Joseon Gyeongnam Cheoldo Jusikhoesa), was a privately owned railway company in Japanese-occupied Korea.

== History ==
The company began operations in 1912, and by 1931 it had opened a network of nearly 250 km (160 mi) in the area around Cheonan. Following the partition of Korea, the entirety of the Chōsen Gyeongnam Railway's network was located in the American zone of occupation. All railways in South Korea, including the Chōsen Gyeongnam Railway, were nationalised in 1946, becoming part of the Korean National Railroad.

The Chōsen Gyeongnam Railway opened the following railway lines between 1912 and 1931:

- 1912: Gunsan Line, 23.1 km (14.4 mi) from Iri on the Chōsen Government Railway's Honam Line to Gunsan;
- 1919–1927: Gyeonggi Line, 69.8 km (43.4 mi) from Cheonan on the Chōsen Government Railway's Gyeongbu Line to Janghowon;
- 1922–1931: Chungnam Line, 144.2 km (89.6 mi) from Cheonan to Janghang Jangyo;
- 1931: Gunsanhang Line, 0.9 km (0.56 mi) from Gunsan to Gunsan Port (became Gunsanbudu (Gunsan Wharf) Station) in 1943.

After the nationalisation, the Korean National Railroad took over these lines, eventually rearranging them. The Gunsan–Gunsan Wharf section of the Gunsan Line was detached to create the Gunsan Freight Line, whilst the Iri–Gunsan section of the Gunsan Line and the entirety of the Ch'ungnam Line from Gunsan to Cheonan were merged to create the Janghang Line in 1955. The Gyeonggi Line was renamed Anseong Line in the same year.

== Services ==
In the November 1942 timetable, the last issued prior to the start of the Pacific War, the Chōsen Gyeongnam Railway was running extensive passenger services on the Chungnam Line, along with three daily round trips on the Gyeonggi Line.

Chungnam Line
Distance (read down)	2nd class Korean yen	3rd class Korean yen	1	3	5	7 (2,3)	9	11	13 (2,3)	15	Station name	Distance (read up)	2nd class Korean yen	3rd class Korean yen	2	4	6 (2,3)	8	10 (2,3)	12	14	16
0.0	-	-	06:55	...	08:40	11:15	13:05	15:40	17:45	20:00	Cheonan	144.2	11.60	5.80	07:50	09:45	11:50	14:15	16:45	19:05	21:30	...
14.7	1.20	0.60	07:26	...	09:20	11:52	13:40	16:13	18:13	20:30	Onyang Oncheon	129.5	10.45	5.25	07:21	09:21	11:25	13:44	16:17	18:41	21:00	...
40.6	3.30	1.65	08:23	...	10:31	12:54	14:38	17:10	19:08	21:29	Yesan	103.6	8.40	4.20	06:18	08:29	10:36	12:24	15:20	17:51	19:52	...
62.6	5.10	2.55	09:09	...	11:45	13:40	15:34	17:55	19:51	22:14	Hongseong	81.6	6.60	3.30	05:28	07:43	09:53	11:30	14:30	17:07	18:55	...
75.3	6.10	3.05	09:37	05:05	...	14:14	16:00	18:15	20:17	22:35	Gwangcheon	68.9	5.60	2.80	05:00	07:20	09:30	...	14:02	16:44	18:20	21:55
143.5	11.60	5.80	11:50	07:42	...	16:52	...	...	22:27	...	Janghang	0.7	0.10	0.05	...	...	07:01	...	11:20	14:24	...	19:19
144.2	11.60	5.80	12:00	07:46	...	16:55	...	...	22:31	...	Janghang Jangyo	0.0	-	-	...	...	06:55	...	11:15	14:20	...	19:15

Gyeonggi Line (3rd class only)
Distance (read down)	Price Korean yen	31	33	35	Station name	Distance (read up)	Price Korean yen	32	34	36
0.0	-	08:25	12:15	19:55	Cheonan	69.8	2.80	07:55	14:25	18:45
28.4	1.20	09:33	13:25	21:06	Anseong	41.4	1.65	06:41	13:07	17:28
69.8	2.80	11:05	14:55	22:35	Janghowon	0.0	-	05:15	11:40	16:00

== Rolling stock ==
Few details are available about the rolling stock operated by the Chōsen Gyeongnam Railway; known are the 100 series and 200 series 2-6-2T tank locomotives, which were later used by the KNR as the Pureo7-100 and Pureo7-200 classes. In addition, two locomotives identical to the Japanese Government Railways Class C11 were delivered new in 1935 and 1936 from Hitachi, numbered 25 (w/n 624) and 26 (w/n 725) respectively.

== Network ==
忠南線 - 충남선 - Chūnan Line - Chungnam Line
Distance		Station name					
Total; km	S2S; km	Transcribed, Korean	Transcribed, Japanese	Hunminjeongeum	Hanja/Kanji	Opened	Connections
0.0	0.0	Cheonan	Ten'an	천안	天安	1 January 1905	Sentetsu Gyeongbu Line, Gyeongnam Railway Gyeonggi Line
9.4	9.4	Mosan	Mōsan	모산	毛山	1 June 1922	
14.7	5.3	Onyang Oncheon	Onyō Onsen	온양온천	温陽温泉	1 June 1922	
		Omok	Gomoku	오목	五木	15 June 1922	
		Dogo Oncheon	Dōkō Onsen	도고온천	道高温泉	15 June 1922	
		Sillyewon	Shinreien	신예원	新禮院	15 June 1922	
40.6		Yesan	Reizan	예산	禮山	15 June 1922	
48.4	7.8	Sapgyo	Sōkyō	삽교	挿橋	1 November 1923	
55.1	6.7	Hwayang	Kayō	화양	華陽	1 November 1922	
60.4	5.3	Hongseong	Kōsei	홍성	洪城	11 March 1923	
66.7	6.3	Sinseong	Shinsei	신성	新城	1 December 1923	
75.3	8.6	Gwangcheon	Kōsen	광천	廣川	1 December 1923	
79.4	4.1	Wonjuk	Genchiku	원죽	元竹	1 December 1929	
83.1	3.7	Jinjuk	Shinchiku	진죽	眞竹	1 December 1929	
87.4	4.3	Boryeong; Jupo (from 1933.1.1)	Hōnei; Shūho	보령 주포	保寧 周浦	1 December 1929	
95.7	8.3	Daecheon	Daisen	대천	大川	1 December 1929	
98.8	3.1	Nampo	Ranpo	남포	藍浦	1 December 1929	
109.2	10.4	Ungcheon	Yūsen	웅천	熊川	1 August 1931	
112.4	3.2	Ganchi	Konchi	간치	艮峙	1 August 1931	
		Pangyo	Hankyō	판교	板橋	1 November 1930	
		Seocheon	Shosen	서천	舒川	1 November 1930	
143.5		Janghang	Chōkō	장항	長項	1 November 1930	
144.2	0.7	Janghang Jangyo	Chōkō Sanbashi	장항잔교	長項棧橋	20 October 1933	(ferry to Gunsanhang Line)

群山線 - 군산선 - Gunsan Line - Gunsan Line
Distance		Station name					
Total; km	S2S; km	Transcribed, Korean	Transcribed, Japanese	Hunminjeongeum	Hanja/Kanji	Opened	Connections
0.0	0.0	Gunsan	Gunsan	군산	群山	12 March 1912	Gyeongnam Railway Gunsanhang Line
5.4	5.4	Gaejeong	Kaishō	개정	開井	1 June 1924	
9.9	1.0	Jigyeong	Jikyō	지경	地境	12 March 1912	
15.1	5.2	Impi	Rinpi	임피	臨陂	1 June 1924	
19.6	4.5	Osalli	Gosanri	오산리	五山里	15 June 1931	
23.1	3.5	Iri	Riri	이리	裡里	6 March 1912	Sentetsu Honam Line

群山港線 - 군산항선 - Gunsankō Line - Gunsanhang Line
Distance		Station name					
Total; km	S2S; km	Transcribed, Korean	Transcribed, Japanese	Hunminjeongeum	Hanja/Kanji	Opened	Connections
0.0	0.0	Gunsan	Gunsan	군산	群山	12 March 1912	Gyeongnam Railway Gunsan Line
0.9	0.9	Gunsanhang; Gunsanbudu (from 1943.12.1)	Gunsankō; Gunsanfutō	군산항역 군산부두	群山港 群山埠頭	1 August 1931	(ferry to Chungnam Line)

京畿線 - 경기선 - Keiki Line - Gyeonggi Line
Distance		Station name					
Total; km	S2S; km	Transcribed, Korean	Transcribed, Japanese	Hunminjeongeum	Hanja/Kanji	Opened	Connections
0.0	0.0	Cheonan	Ten'an	천안	天安	1 January 1905	Sentetsu Gyeongbu Line, Gyeongnam Railway Chungnam Line
7.0	7.0	Seokgyo	Sekikyō	석교	石橋	1 November 1925	
14.1	7.1	Ipchang	Ryūjō	입장	笠場	1 November 1925	
19.7	5.6	Koji	Kochi	고지	古池	1 November 1925	
22.9	3.2	Miyang	Miyō	미양	薇陽	1 November 1925	
28.4	5.5	Anseong	Ansei	안성	安城	1 November 1925	
29.6	1.2	Anseongumnae	Anseiōnai	안성읍내	安城邑內	16 April 1927	
36.4	6.8	Majeon	Maden	마전	麻田	16 April 1927	
41.7	5.3	Samjuk	Sanchiku	삼죽	三竹	16 April 1927	
44.6	2.9	Yongwol	Ryōgetsu	용월	龍月	16 April 1927	
47.0	2.4	Juksan	Chikuzan	죽산	竹山	16 April 1927	
48.0	1.0	Juksanumnae	Chikuzanōnai	죽산읍내	竹山邑内	15 September 1927	
51.2	3.2	Maesan	Maisan	매산	梅山	15 September 1927	
55.9	4.7	Jucheon	Shusen	주천	注川	15 September 1927	
59.8	3.9	Haengjuk	Kōchiku	행죽	行竹	15 September 1927	
63.3	3.5	Daeseo	Daisei	대서	大西	15 September 1927	
69.8	6.5	Janghowon	Chōkoen	장호원	長湖院	15 September 1927	
