= Bongmyeong station =

Station of the Seoul Metropolitan Subway

봉명; Bongmyeong
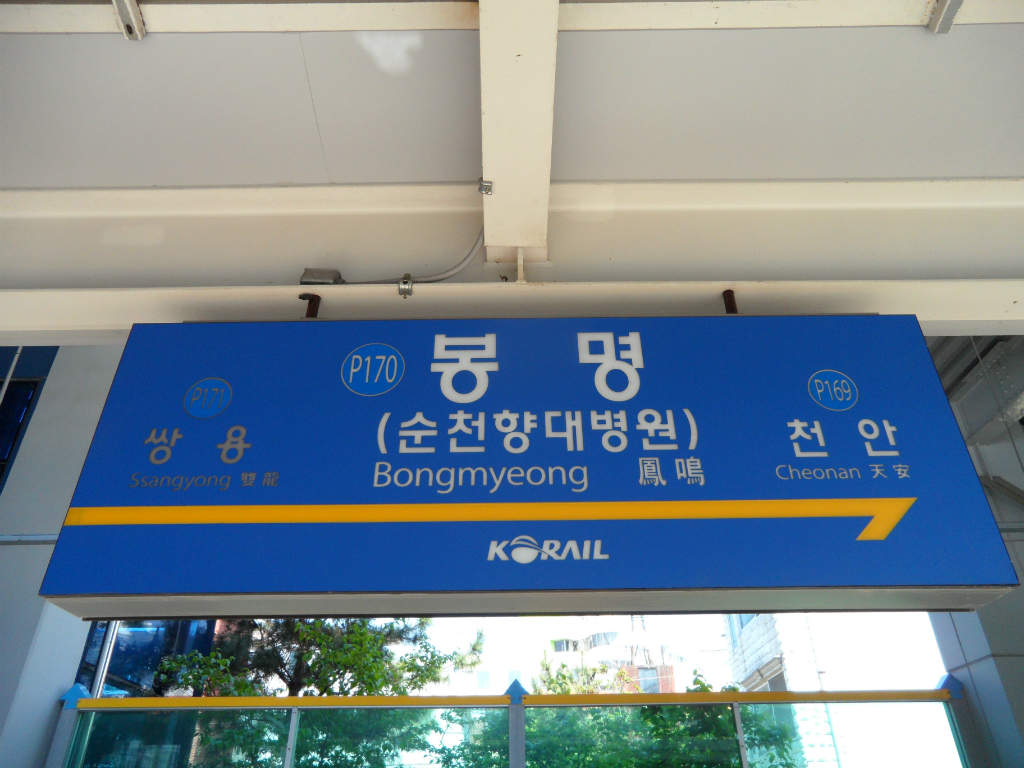

Korean name
- Hangul: 봉명역
- Hanja: 鳳鳴驛
- Revised Romanization: Bongmyeong-yeok
- McCune–Reischauer: Pongmyŏng-yŏk

General information
- Location: 20-2 Bongmyeong-dong, 51 Chadol-ro, Dongnam-gu, Cheonan-si, Chungcheongnam-do
- Coordinates: 36°48′04″N 127°08′08″E
- Operator: Korail
- Line: Janghang Line
- Platforms: 2
- Tracks: 2

Construction
- Structure type: Aboveground

History
- Opened: December 15, 2008

Passengers
- (Daily) Based on Jan-Dec of 2012. Line 1: 2,765

Services
Preceding station	Seoul Metropolitan Subway	Following station
Cheonan towards Kwangwoon University	Line 1	Ssangyong towards Sinchang
Cheonan towards Cheongnyangni or Seoul	Line 1 Gyeongbu Express	Ssangyong towards Sinchang
Location

Bongmyeong station (Korean: 봉명역) is a station on Line 1 of the Seoul Metropolitan Subway. It opened in December 2008.

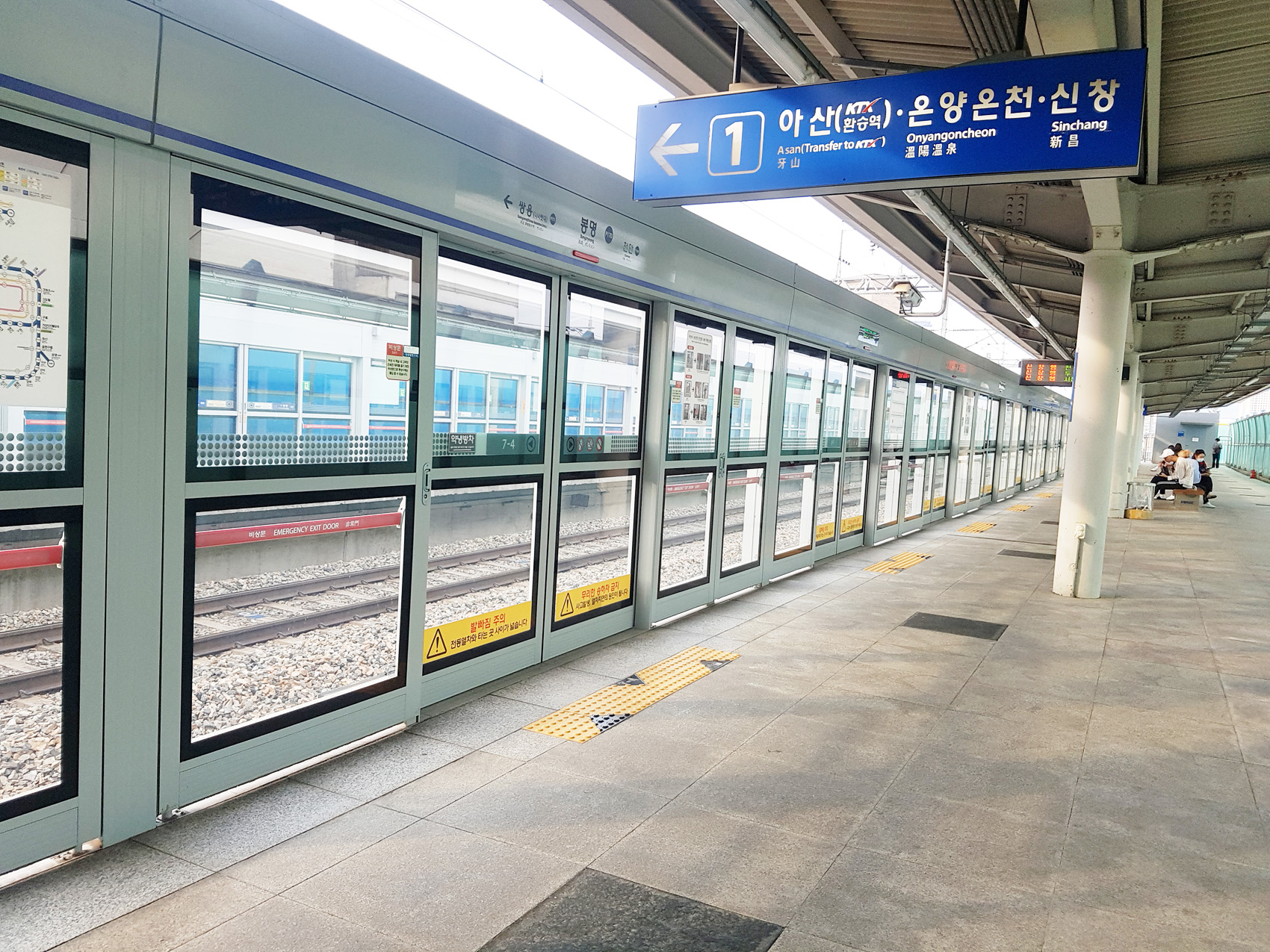
Platform
