= Ssangyong station =

Station of the Seoul Metropolitan Subway

쌍용 (나사렛대); Ssangyong (Korea Nazarene Univ.)
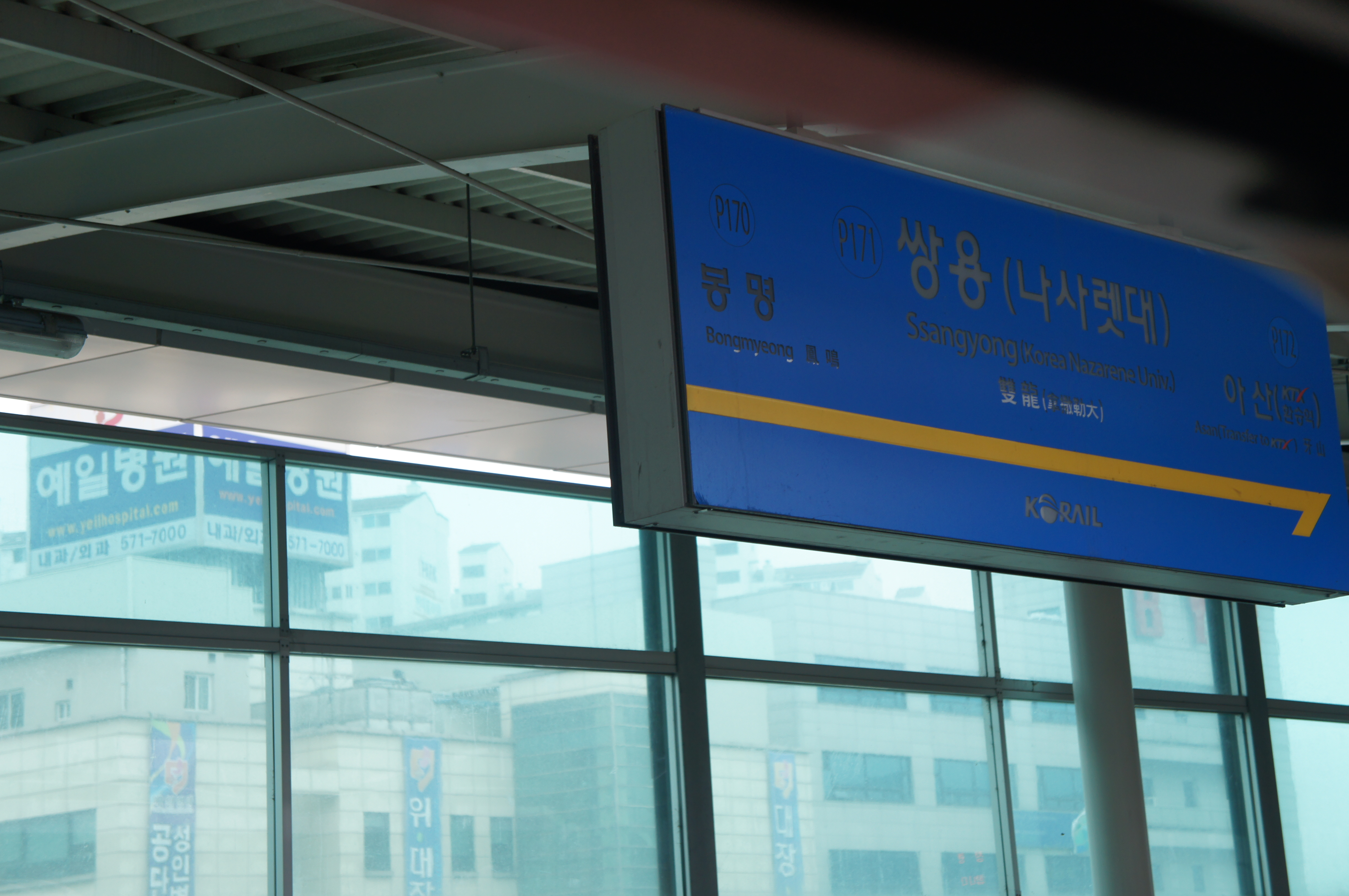

Korean name
- Hangul: 쌍용역
- Hanja: 雙龍驛
- Revised Romanization: Ssangyong-yeok
- McCune–Reischauer: Ssangyong-yŏk

General information
- Location: 426-3 Ssangyong 2-dong, 81 Ssangyong 17-gil Seobuk-gu, Cheonan-si, Chungcheongnam-do
- Coordinates: 36°47′37.65″N 127°7′16.31″E
- Operator: Korail
- Line: Janghang Line
- Platforms: 2
- Tracks: 2

Construction
- Structure type: Aboveground

History
- Opened: December 15, 2008

Passengers
- (Daily) Based on Jan-Dec of 2012. Line 1: 5,650

Services
Preceding station	Seoul Metropolitan Subway	Following station
Bongmyeong towards Kwangwoon University	Line 1	Asan towards Sinchang
Bongmyeong towards Cheongnyangni or Seoul	Line 1 Gyeongbu Express	Asan towards Sinchang
Location

Ssangyong Station is a station on Line 1 of the Seoul Metropolitan Subway. It was opened in December 2008.

It is the closest station to Korea Nazarene University.

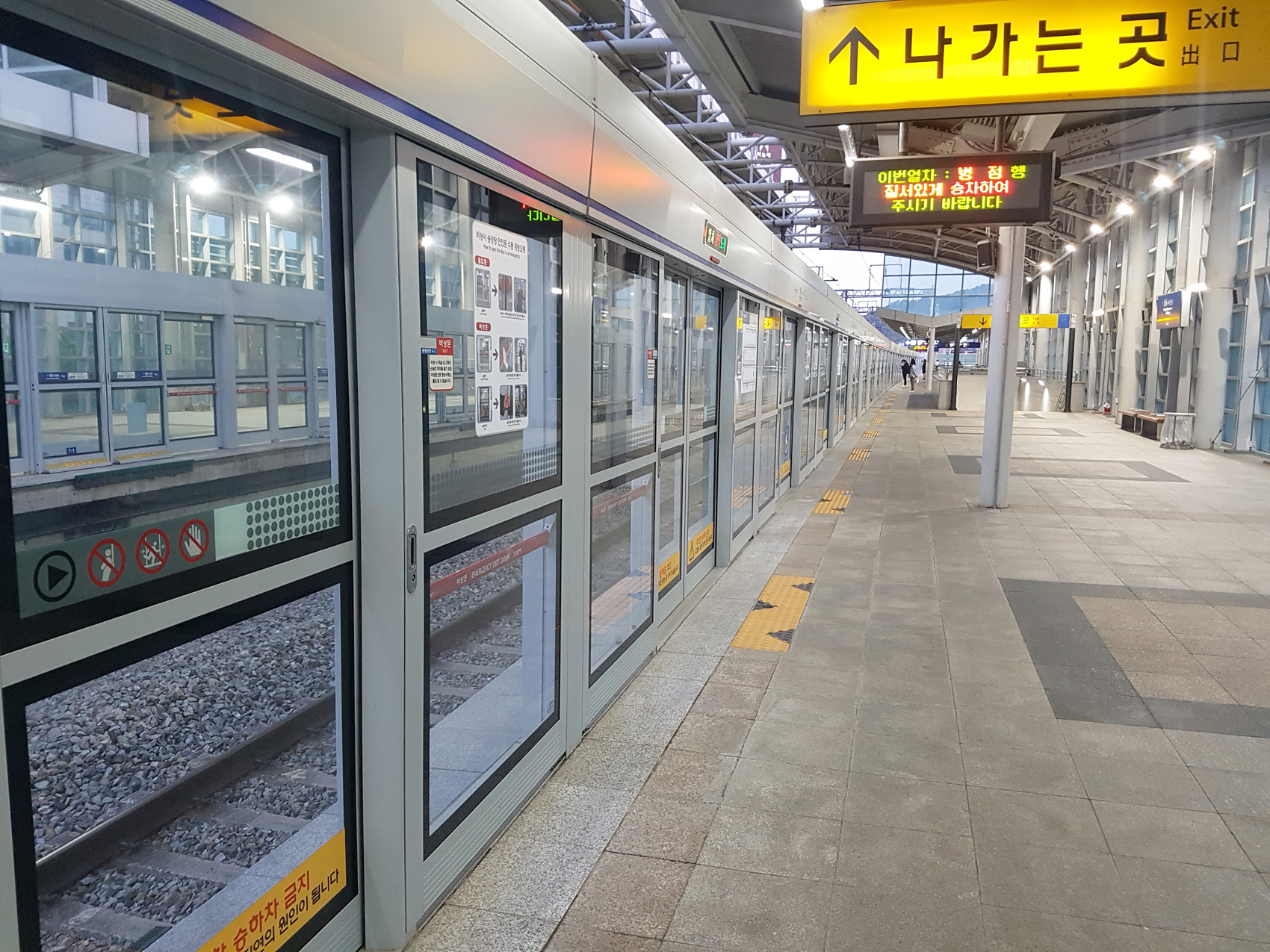
Platform
