= Okgu Line =

Railway line in South Korea

Overview
- Native name: 옥구선
- Status: Occasionality operating
- Termini: Gunsan Oksan; Okgu
- Stations: 2

Service
- Type: Cargo Branch Line

History
- Opened: February 25, 1953

Technical
- Line length: 7.9 km (4.9 mi)
- Number of tracks: 1
- Track gauge: 1,435 mm (4 ft 8 1/2 in)

- Okgu Line
- Hangul: 옥구선
- Hanja: 沃構線
- RR: Okguseon
- MR: Okkusŏn

Okgu Line (Korean: 옥구선) is a cargo branch line from Gunsan Port Line, connecting from GunsanOksan station to Okgu station. Okgu line is registered in distance post, but suspended as cargo or passenger transportation several years ago This line was virtually closed status, but April 1, 2011, resumed cargo transport.

== Line information ==
- Total Line length : 7.9 km
- Line Operator : Korail
- Rail Gauge : 1435mm (Standard gauge)
- Number of Stations : 2
- Double-track section : None (Whole Single track)
- Electrificated section : None

== Station list ==
| Name | Korean | Hanja | Distance (km) | Total distance (km) | Connected Line | Location | | Note |
|---|---|---|---|---|---|---|---|---|
| GunsanOksan | 군산옥산 | 群山玉山 | 0.0 | 0.0 | Gunsan Port Line | North Jeolla | Gunsan | |
| ~~Sangpyeong~~ | 상평 | 上坪 | 3.7 | 3.7 | | North Jeolla | Gunsan | Closed |
| Okgu | 옥구 | 沃構 | 4.2 | 7.9 | | North Jeolla | Gunsan | |

== History ==
Okgu line was supply railway for United Nations peacekeeping(Seventh Air Force) in Gunsan Airfield. May 20, 1952, construction of Okgu line began by UN army, and finished construction at February 25, 1953. Operation of Okgu line started March 9. Okgu line also did the corn transport to Gunsan Port.

For some time, bidulgiho was operated in line, 6 times per day. But passenger transportation was suspended in 1990s. And cargo transportation also suspended in 2000. In 2011, Haiman(Company that responsibility for Airfield supply) requested train operation, so cargo train occasionally operating for now.

Original name at line open was Gunsan Airfield Line(군산비행장선, 群山飛行場線), but name changed to Okgu line at September 1, 1955.

=== Timeline ===
- 1952/5/20 : Gunsan Airfield Line construction began by United Nation
- 1953/2/25 : Gunsan Airfield Line construction finished
- 1953/3/9 : Operation began
- 1955/9/1 : Name changed to Okgu Line
- 1970/6/11 : Passenger transportation suspended
- 2000/11/15 : Train operation suspended
- 2011/4/1 : Train operation resumed
- 2020/12/10 : Its eastern terminus was changed from Gunsan Hwamul Station to GunsanOksan Station.

== See also ==
- Korail
- Gunsan Hwamul Line
- Gunsan Port Line
