= Gunsan Port Line =

Railway line in South Korea

Gunsan Port Line (Korean: 군산항선; Hanja: 群山港線) is a cargo branch line from Janghang Line, connecting from Daeya station to Gunsan Port station. It is located in the city of Gunsan, North Jeolla Province, South Korea

== See also ==
- Korail
- Gunsan Hwamul Line
- Okgu Line
