= KNR Pureo7-100 class locomotives =

2-6-2 steam locomotive

Chosen Gyeongnam Railway 100 series Korean National Railroad Pureo7-100 class (푸러7-100)
Type and origin
- Power type: Steam
- Builder: Nippon Sharyō
- Build date: 1928
- Total produced: 1
Specifications
- Configuration
  - Whyte: 2-6-2T
- Gauge: 1,435 mm (4 ft 8 1/2 in)
Career
- Operators: Chosen Gyeongnam Railway; Korean National Railroad
- Class: CGR: 100; KNR: 푸러7-100
- Number in class: 1
- Numbers: CGR: 101; KNR: 푸러7-101
- Delivered: 1928

The Pureo7-100 class (Korean: 푸러7-100) consisted of a single steam tank locomotive with 2-6-2 wheel arrangement, which the Korean National Railroad operated in South Korea. The "Pureo" name came from the American naming system for steam locomotives, under which locomotives with 2-6-2 wheel arrangement were called "Prairie".

In all, the Chosen Government Railway owned 227 locomotives of all Pure classes, whilst privately owned railways owned another 52 - including this one; of these 279 locomotives, 169 went to the Korean National Railroad in South Korea and 110 to the Korean State Railway in North Korea.

The Chosen Gyeongnam Railway, a privately owned railway in the southwestern part of colonial-era Korea, received a single 2-6-2T tank locomotive built by Nippon Sharyō of Japan in 1928, which it numbered 101. After the Liberation and partition of Korea, all railways in South Korea were nationalised, and this locomotive was taken up by the new Korean National Railroad, which designated the design the 푸러7-100 (Pureo7-100) class and numbered the locomotive 푸러7-101.
