= Sangpyeong station =

Railway station in Jeollabuk-do, South Korea

상평
Sangpyeong

General information
- Location: Sangpyeong-ri, Okgu-eup, Okgu-gun, North Jeolla; South Korea
- Line: Okgu Line
- Distance: 7.4 km
- Platforms: 1

Other information
- Status: Closed

History
- Opened: 1 August 1955
- Closed: 31 December 1981

Sangpyeong station (Korean: 상평역; Hanja: 上坪驛) is a closed train station in Okgu Line, North Jeolla, South Korea.

== Timeline ==
- August 1, 1955: Station opened as an unstaffed simplified station
- November 1, 1958: Class changed to a staffed simplified station
- July 20, 1972: Class changed to an unstaffed simplified station
- December 31, 1981: Station services suspended
