= Gunsan Hwamul Line =

1912–2020 railway line in South Korea

Overview
- Status: closed
- Owner: Korea Rail Network Authority
- Termini: Gunsan Gargo Line Separation Point; Gunsan Cargo
- Stations: 3

Service
- Type: Regional rail
- Route number: 30802
- Operator: Korail

History
- Opened: March 6, 1912

Technical
- Line length: 8.9 km
- Number of tracks: Single track
- Track gauge: 1,435mm
- Electrification: No

- Gunsan Hwamul Line
- Hangul: 군산화물선
- Hanja: 群山貨物線
- RR: Gunsan hwamulseon
- MR: Kunsan hwamulsŏn

The Gunsan Hwamul (Cargo) Line (Korean: 군산화물선) is an abandoned cargo railway line serving North Jeolla Province in South Korea. Before January 1, 2008, this line was called Gunsan Line which connected the major railway junction of Iksan (on the Honam Line) to the city of Gunsan.

As of January 2008, New connecting line between Janghang (Janghang Line) and Daeya opened. Iksan – Daeya was included into Janghang Line, new Gunsan station opened, old Gunsan Station was renamed Gunsan Freight Station, passenger transportation between Daeya Station and Gunsan Freight Station was stopped and the line was renamed to Gunsan Hwamul (Cargo) Line.

As of December 2020, new connecting line (Gunsan Port Line) between Janghang Line, Okgu Line and Gunsan Port opened. Therefore Gunsan Hwamul Line is abandoned.

== Line Data ==
- Length: 8.9 km (+1.2 km between Daeya and the junction)
- Double track: Nil
- Gauge: 1,435mm

== See also ==
- Korean National Railroad
- Transportation in South Korea
