= Janghang Line =

Railway line in Chungnam, South Korea

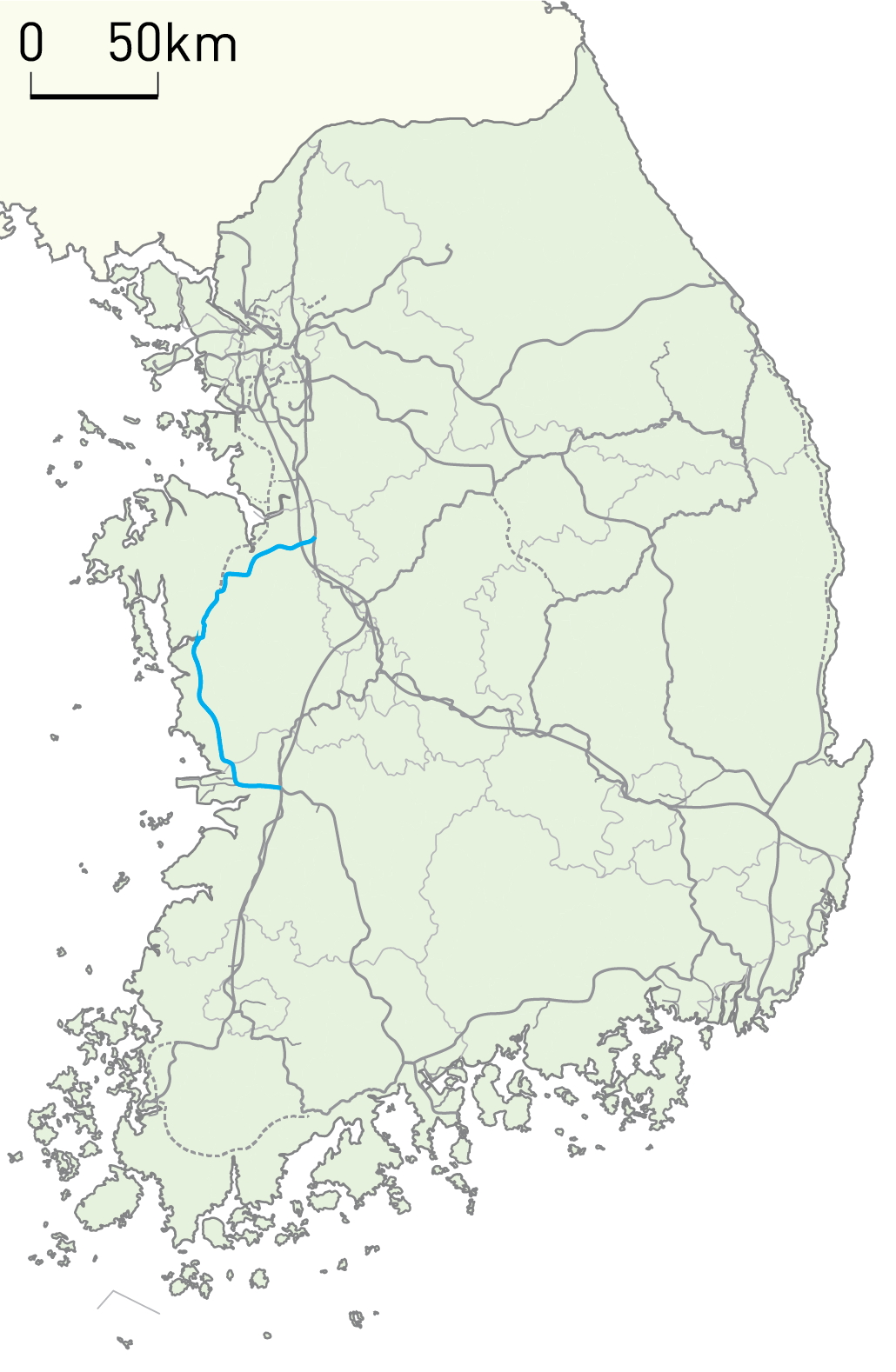

Overview
- Native name: 장항선(長項線)
- Status: Operational
- Owner: Korea Rail Network Authority
- Locale: South Chungcheong; North Jeolla
- Termini: Cheonan; Iksan
- Stations: 30

Service
- Type: Heavy rail, Passenger/freight rail Regional rail, Commuter rail
- Operator: Korail

Technical
- Line length: 154.4 km (95.9 mi)
- Num of tracks: Double track (Cheonan - Sinchang); Single track
- Track gauge: 1,435 mm (4 ft 8 1/2 in) standard gauge
- Electrification: 25 kV 60 Hz AC Overhead line (Cheonan - Sinchang)

- Janghang Line
- Hangul: 장항선
- Hanja: 長項線
- RR: Janghangseon
- MR: Changhangsŏn

The Janghang Line is a railway line serving South Chungcheong Province in South Korea. The line connects Cheonan (on the Gyeongbu Line) to the railway junction city of Iksan. The Janghang Line is served by frequent Saemaeul-ho and Mugunghwa-ho passenger train services between Seoul and Iksan. There is also a link from Asan station to the KTX network at Cheonan-Asan station.

== History ==
The original Janghang Line was opened along its full length running between Cheonan and Janghang by the Chosen Gyeongnam Railway on June 1, 1922.

=== Upgrade ===
The entire Janghang Line is being electrified, double-tracked, and upgraded for higher speeds with a straighter alignment. Work started in 1997 from Cheonan. By the end of 2008, the new alignment was in service from Cheonan via Asan and Hongseong to Sinseong, from Jupo to Nampo, and from Ganchi to Janghang, and electrification was put in service on the first 19.4 km (12.1 mi) between Cheonan and Sinchang, after Asan, on December 15, 2008. The 17.1 km (10.6 mi) section near Janghang, opened in December 2007, also linked up the Janghang Line with the previously isolated Iksan-Gunsan line via a new bridge over the Geum River, with alignment built for two tracks but initially only one track was laid. In 2010, the remaining sections were slated to be completed by 2018, but complete double-tracking and electrification was no longer planned on the short term due to expected low demand. The realigned 14.2 km (8.8 mi) Nampo-Ganchi section, including the relocated Ungcheon station, was opened on January 5, 2021. As of April 2023, the double-tracking of the Sinchang-Hongseong section was 85% completed and expected to be opened in the second half of 2024. Also as of April 2023, the double-tracking of the Hongseong-Daeya section, including the 18.8 km (11.7 mi) Sinseong-Jupo realignment that was scheduled to begin construction in 2023, was in advanced planning, with a 2027 completion targeted.

The Janghang Line will link up with the Seohae Line at Hongseong station. The Seohae Line will connect Hongseong to Hwaseong in Gyeonggi-do when it opens in the second half of 2024. It will be connected to southern extension of the Sosa–Wonsi Line and Sinansan Line. Seohae Line will serve 250 km/h (155 mph) speed, which will dramatically reduce travel time between Seoul and Hongseong.

Sinchang-Hongseong section will be double track electrifed when Seohae Line open.

== Services ==
=== Seoul Metropolitan Subway ===
Seoul Subway's Line 1 services run on the line between Cheonan–Sinchang stations.

== Stations ==
station	Hangul	Hanja	station distance in km	Line distance in km	Connecting lines	Location	
Cheonan	천안	天安	0.0	0.0	Gyeongbu Line	Chungcheongnam-do	Cheonan-si
Bongmyeong	봉명	鳳鳴	1.3	1.3		Chungcheongnam-do	Cheonan-si
Ssangyong	쌍용	雙龍	1.6	2.9		Chungcheongnam-do	Cheonan-si
Asan	아산	牙山	1.6	4.5	Gyeongbu KTX	Chungcheongnam-do	Asan-si
Tangjeong	탕정	湯井	1.8	6.3		Chungcheongnam-do	Asan-si
Baebang	배방	排芳	3.1	9.4		Chungcheongnam-do	Asan-si
Onyangoncheon	온양온천	溫陽溫泉	4.9	14.3		Chungcheongnam-do	Asan-si
Sinchang	신창	新昌	5.1	19.4		Chungcheongnam-do	Asan-si
Dogooncheon	도고온천	道高溫泉	5.8	25.2		Chungcheongnam-do	Asan-si
Sillyewon	신례원	新禮院	4.5	29.7		Chungcheongnam-do	Yesan-gun
Yesan	예산	禮山	5.0	34.7		Chungcheongnam-do	Yesan-gun
Sapgyo	삽교	揷橋	7.8	42.5		Chungcheongnam-do	Yesan-gun
Hwayang	화양	華陽	6.7	49.2		Chungcheongnam-do	Hongseong-gun
Hongseong	홍성	洪城	5.3	54.5	Seohae Line	Chungcheongnam-do	Hongseong-gun
Sinseong	신성	新城	4.1	58.6		Chungcheongnam-do	Hongseong-gun
Gwangcheon	광천	廣川	8.6	67.2		Chungcheongnam-do	Hongseong-gun
Wonjuk	원죽	元竹	4.1	71.3		Chungcheongnam-do	Boryeong-si
Cheongso	청소	靑所	3.7	75.0		Chungcheongnam-do	Boryeong-si
Jupo	주포	周浦	4.3	79.3		Chungcheongnam-do	Boryeong-si
Daecheon	대천	大川	8.3	87.6		Chungcheongnam-do	Boryeong-si
Nampo	남포	藍浦	3.1	90.7		Chungcheongnam-do	Boryeong-si
Ungcheon	웅천	熊川	10.4	101.1		Chungcheongnam-do	Boryeong-si
Ganchi	간치	艮峙	3.2	104.3	Seocheon-hwaryeok Line	Chungcheongnam-do	Boryeong-si
Pangyo	판교	板橋	8.3	112.6		Chungcheongnam-do	Seocheon-gun
Seocheon	서천	舒川	8.6	121.2		Chungcheongnam-do	Seocheon-gun
Janghang	장항	長項	4.8	126.0	Janghang-hwamul Line		Seocheon-gun
Gunsan	군산	群山	7.0	133.0		Jeollabuk-do	Gunsan-si
			7.2	140.2	Gunsan-hwamul Line	Jeollabuk-do	Gunsan-si
Daeya	대야	大野	1.0	141.2	Gunsan Port Line	Jeollabuk-do	Gunsan-si
Impi	임피	臨陂	5.2	146.4		Jeollabuk-do	Gunsan-si
Osan-ri	오산리	五山里	4.5	150.9		Jeollabuk-do	Iksan-si
Iksan	익산	益山	3.5	154.4	Honam Line; Jeolla Line	Jeollabuk-do	Iksan-si

== See also ==
- Korail
- Transportation in South Korea
