= Korea Polytechnic IV Asan =

Asan Information and Technology Polytechnic College
- Type: Public
- Established: 2002
- President: Hyun-Suk Jung
- Administrative staff: 35
- Location: Asan, South Chungcheong, South Korean
- Website: www.asan.ac.kr/eng/

- Korea Polytechnic IV Asan
- Hangul: 아산정보기능대학
- Hanja: 牙山情報技能大學
- RR: Asan jeongbo gineung daehak
- MR: Asan chŏngbo kinŭng taehak

Asan Information & Technology Polytechnic College is located in Sinchang-myeon, Asan city, South Chungcheong province, not far from Soonchunhyang University. The current president of the college is Hyun-Suk Jung. Apart from the Department of Information & Communication Systems, the school's other departments are concerned with various aspects of digital design: the school includes departments of multimedia, computer animation, visual communication design, and visual media.

The South Korean Ministry of Labor began laying plans for the college in 1996, and construction on the campus was underway by 1999. The first class of students was admitted on March 2, 2002. The school currently employs around 35 staff. Campus facilities include a library, dormitory, cafeteria and golf course.

== See also ==
- Education in South Korea
- List of colleges and universities in South Korea
