= Lee O-young =

South Korean author (1934–2022)

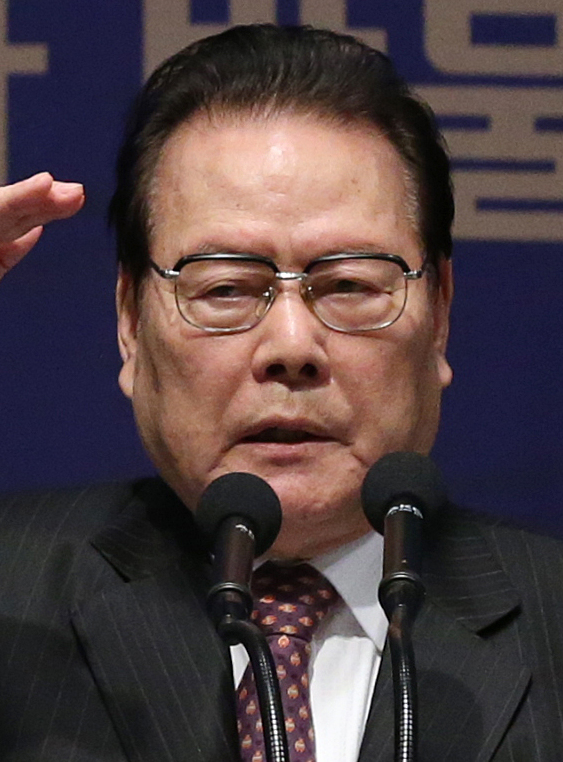
- O-young in 2012
- Born: 15 January 1934; Asan, Korea, Empire of Japan
- Died: 26 February 2022 (aged 88)
- Writing career
- Language: Korean

Korean name
- Hangul: 이어령
- Hanja: 李御寧
- RR: I Eoryeong
- MR: I Ŏryŏng

Lee O-young (also known as Lee Eo-ryeong, Yi O-young, or Yi O-yŏng; Korean: 이어령; 15 January 1934 – 26 February 2022) was a South Korean critic and novelist.

== Life and career ==
Lee O-young was born on 15 January 1934, (other sources say 29 December 1933) in Asan, Chūseinan Province, Korea, Empire of Japan. He attended Buyeo High School and Seoul National University, where he received undergraduate (1956) and graduate (1959) degrees in Korean literature. He taught at Ewha Womans University, where he became a professor emeritus, and at Dankook University. He was the chief editor of Munhak sasang (Literary Thought) and served as South Korea's Minister of Culture.

He died of cancer on 26 February 2022, at the age of 88.

== Work ==
Lee was one of the most prominent figures to emerge from the "post-war generation" of Korean critics. Making his mark with his first piece of literary criticism, "Lee Sang non" ("On Lee Sang", 1955), he caused a stir in literary circles with his next essay, "Usang eui pagoe" ("Destruction of an Idol"), published in Hankook Ilbo in 1956. At a time when the war experience seemed to have devastated the literary imagination as well, Lee argued for the expansion and enrichment of Korean literature in articles that featured considerable rhetorical sophistication and verve.

== Contribution to South Korea's informatization ==
In the early 1990s, Lee and journalist Ahn Byung-hoon collaborated on a public campaign built around the slogan "Industrialization was late, but let us lead in informatization" (산업화는 늦었지만 정보화는 앞서가자). Lee contributed the underlying ideas while Ahn coined the slogan and promoted the campaign through The Chosun Ilbo.

== Literary works ==
=== Translated works ===
- The General's Beard (장군의 수염)

=== Works in Korean (partial) ===
Critical collections

- Jeohang eui munhak (Literature of Resistance, 1959)
- Jeonhu munhag eui saemulgyeol (The New Wave of Postwar Literature)
- Tonggeum sidae eui munhak (Literature in the Age of Curfew)

Fiction

- Janggun eui suyeom (The General's Beard)
- Amsalja (The Assassin)
- Jeonjaeng Dekameron (Wartime Decameron)
- Hwangag eui dari (Phantom Legs)

Essays

- Heuk soge jeo baram soge (In This Earth & In That Wind: This Is Korea, 1963)
- Sin han kuk in (New Korean, 1986)
- Chook so ji hyange ilbonin (Japanese people who are scaled down, 2008)
- Digilog (digilog, 2006)
- Jisunge Osolgil (The path of the intellect, 2004)
- Jisung esu youngsung euro (From intellect to spirituality, 2017)

== Awards ==
Lee received a number of Korean and international awards.

- 1979: Korean Award for Culture and Art (대한민국 문화예술상)
- 1992: Award for Design Culture of Japan (일본 디자인문화상)
- 1996: 24th Award of Japan for International Exchange (제24회 일본 국제교류기금 대상)
- 2001: Cultural Award of Seoul (서울시문화상, 문학부문)
- 2003: 48th Award of the Korean Council for Art (제48회 대한민국 예술원상, 문학부문)
- 2007: 2nd Mask of Respect Award (제2회 마크 오브 리스펙트상)
- 2007: Samil Prize (3·1문화상)
- 2009: 2nd Grand Award for Korean People, category for literature (제2회 한민족문화예술대상 문학부문상)
- 2009: International Masaoka Shiki Award (마사오카 시키 국제 하이쿠상)
- 2011: 20th Sochung Saseon Culture Award, special award (제20회 소충 사선문화상 특별상)
- 2011: 24th Christian Culture Award, special award in literature (제24회 기독교문화대상 시상식 문학 특상)
