= KNR Pureo7-200 class locomotives =

2-6-2 steam locomotive

Chosen Gyeongnam Railway 200 series Korean National Railroad Pureo7-200 class (푸러7-200)
Type and origin
- Power type: Steam
- Builder: Porter
- Build date: 1921
- Total produced: ≥11
Specifications
- Configuration
  - Whyte: 2-6-2T
- Gauge: 1,435 mm (4 ft 8 1/2 in)
Career
- Operators: Chosen Gyeongnam Railway; Korean National Railroad
- Class: CGR: 100; KNR: 푸러7-200
- Number in class: ≥11
- Numbers: CGR: 201 – 211; KNR: 푸러7-201 – 푸러7-211
- Delivered: 1921

The Pureo7-200 class (Korean: 푸러7-200) was a class of 2-6-2-T steam locomotives, operated by the Korean National Railroad in South Korea. The "Pureo" name came from the American naming system for steam locomotives, under which locomotives with 2-6-2 wheel arrangement were called "Prairie".

In all, the Chosen Government Railway owned 227 locomotives of all Pure classes, whilst privately owned railways owned another 52 - including these; of these 279 locomotives, 169 went to the Korean National Railroad in South Korea and 110 to the Korean State Railway in North Korea.

The Chosen Gyeongnam Railway, a privately owned railway in the southwestern part of colonial-era Korea, received at least eleven 2-6-2T tank locomotives built by H.K. Porter, Inc. of the United States in 1921, which it numbered 201 through at least 211. After the Liberation and partition of Korea, all railways in South Korea were nationalised, and these locomotives were taken up by the new Korean National Railroad, which designated the class 푸러7-200 (Pureo7-200) class and numbered the locomotives 푸러7-201 though at least 푸러7-211.
