= An Gyeong-ja =

South Korean volleyball player (born 1950)

Personal information
- Nationality: South Korean
- Born: 8 August 1950 (age 75) Asan, South Korea

Sport
- Sport: Volleyball

An Gyeong-ja (born 8 August 1950) is a South Korean volleyball player. She competed in the women's tournament at the 1968 Summer Olympics.
