= Gwangcheon station =

Railway station in South Korea

광천
Gwangcheon
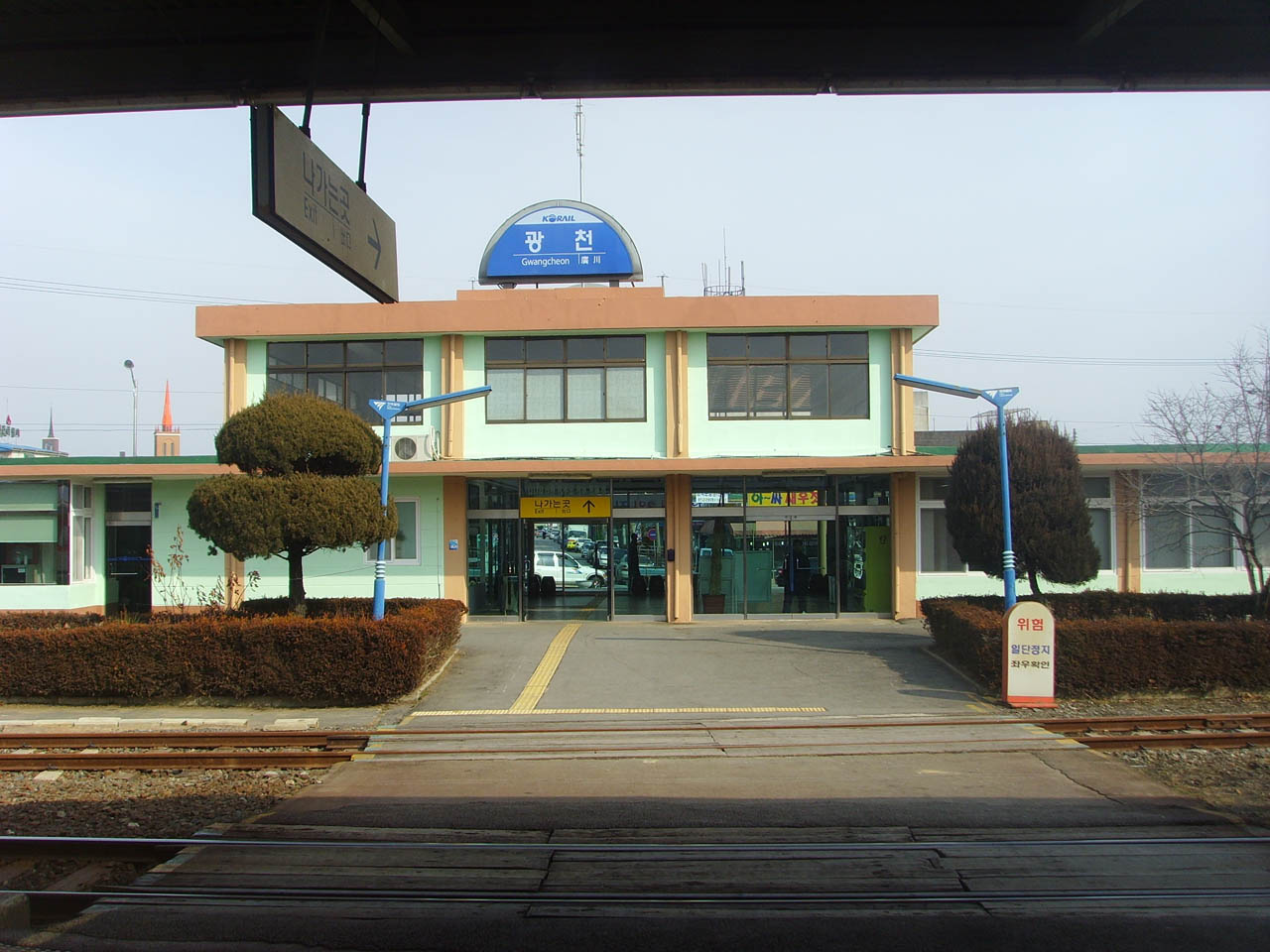

Korean name
- Hangul: 광천역
- Hanja: 廣川驛
- Revised Romanization: Gwangcheonnyeok
- McCune–Reischauer: Kwangch'ŏnnyŏk

General information
- Location: Sinjin-ri, Gwangcheon-eup, Hongseong, South Chungcheong; South Korea
- Coordinates: 36°30′5.59″N 126°37′20.39″E
- Owner: Korail

History
- Opened: 1 December 1923
Location

Gwangcheon station is a railway station in Gwangcheon-eup, Hongseong, South Chungcheong, South Korea, on the Janghang Line of Korail.

== Services ==
Gwangcheon station serves as a passenger railway station on the Janghang line with connections to other railway lines providing access to major cities such as Iksan.
