= Hongseong station =

Train station in South Korea

홍성
Hongseong
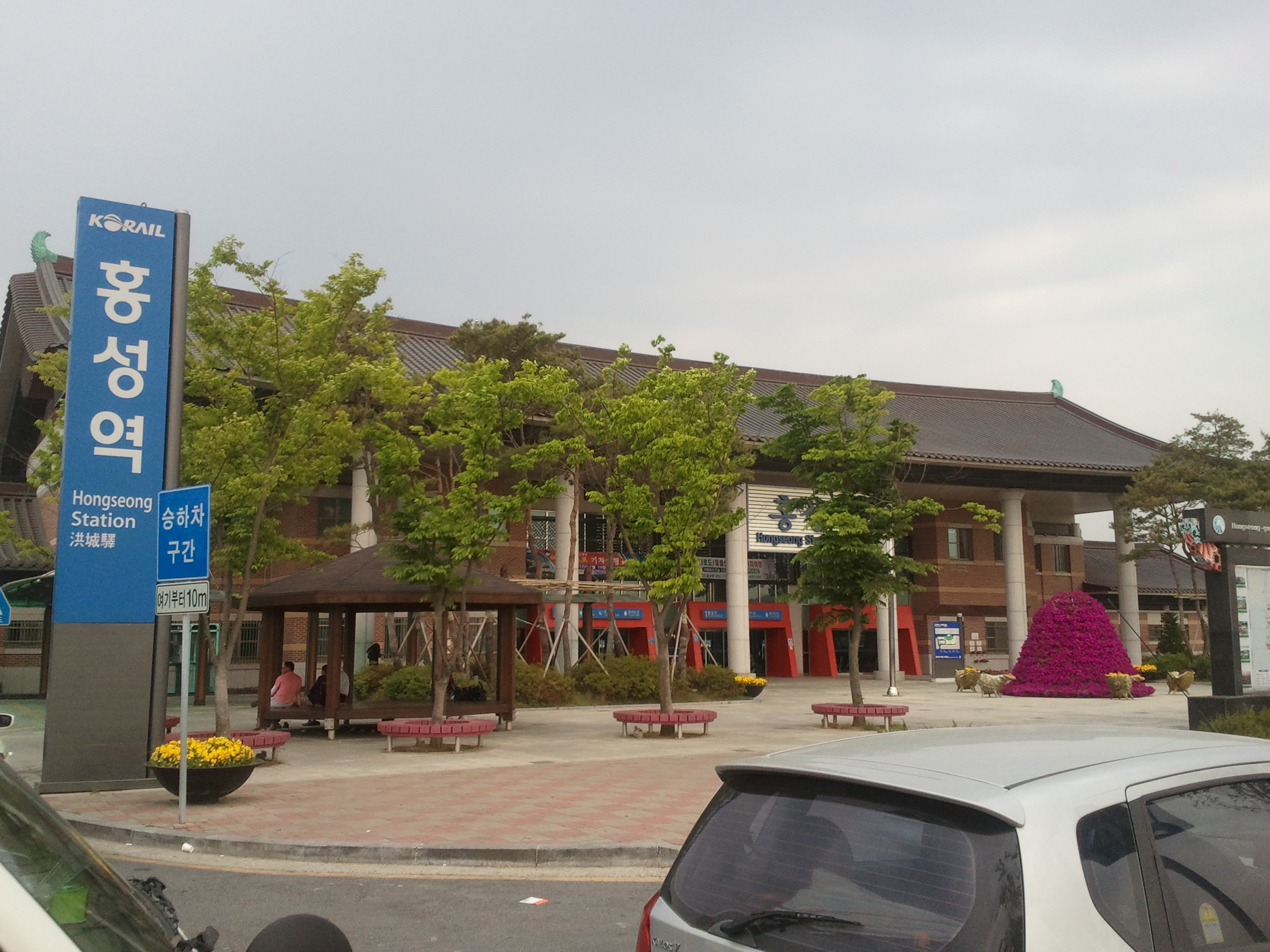

Korean name
- Hangul: 홍성역
- Hanja: 洪城驛
- Revised Romanization: Hongseong yeok
- McCune–Reischauer: Hongsŏng yŏk

General information
- Location: Hongseong-eup, Hongseong, South Chungcheong; South Korea
- Coordinates: 36°35′58″N 126°40′52″E
- Owner: Korail

History
- Opened: 1 November 1923

Services
Preceding station	Korail	Following station
Yesan towards Yongsan	ITX-Maum Janghang Line	Terminus
Hapdeok towards Seohwaseong	ITX-Maum Seohae Line	Terminus
Sapgyo Next counterclockwise	ITX-Maum Pyeongtaek Line	Hapdeok Next clockwise
Sapgyo towards Yongsan	Saemaeul-ho Janghang Line	Gwangcheon towards Iksan
Sapgyo towards Yongsan	Mugunghwa-ho Janghang Line	Gwangcheon towards Iksan
Yesan towards Yongsan	G-Train	Gwangcheon towards Iksan
Location

Hongseong station (Korean: 홍성역) is a railway station in Hongseong-eup, Hongseong, South Chungcheong, South Korea, on the Janghang Line and Seohae Line of Korail.

== History ==
- 1 November 1923 - Janghang Line was opened.
- 1 December 2008 - The station was changed to current location.
- 2 November 2024 - Seohae Line was opened.
