= Sinchang station =

Railway station in South Korea

신창 (순천향대)
Sinchang
(Soonchunhyang Univ.)
신창 (순천향대); Sinchang (Soonchunhyang Univ.)
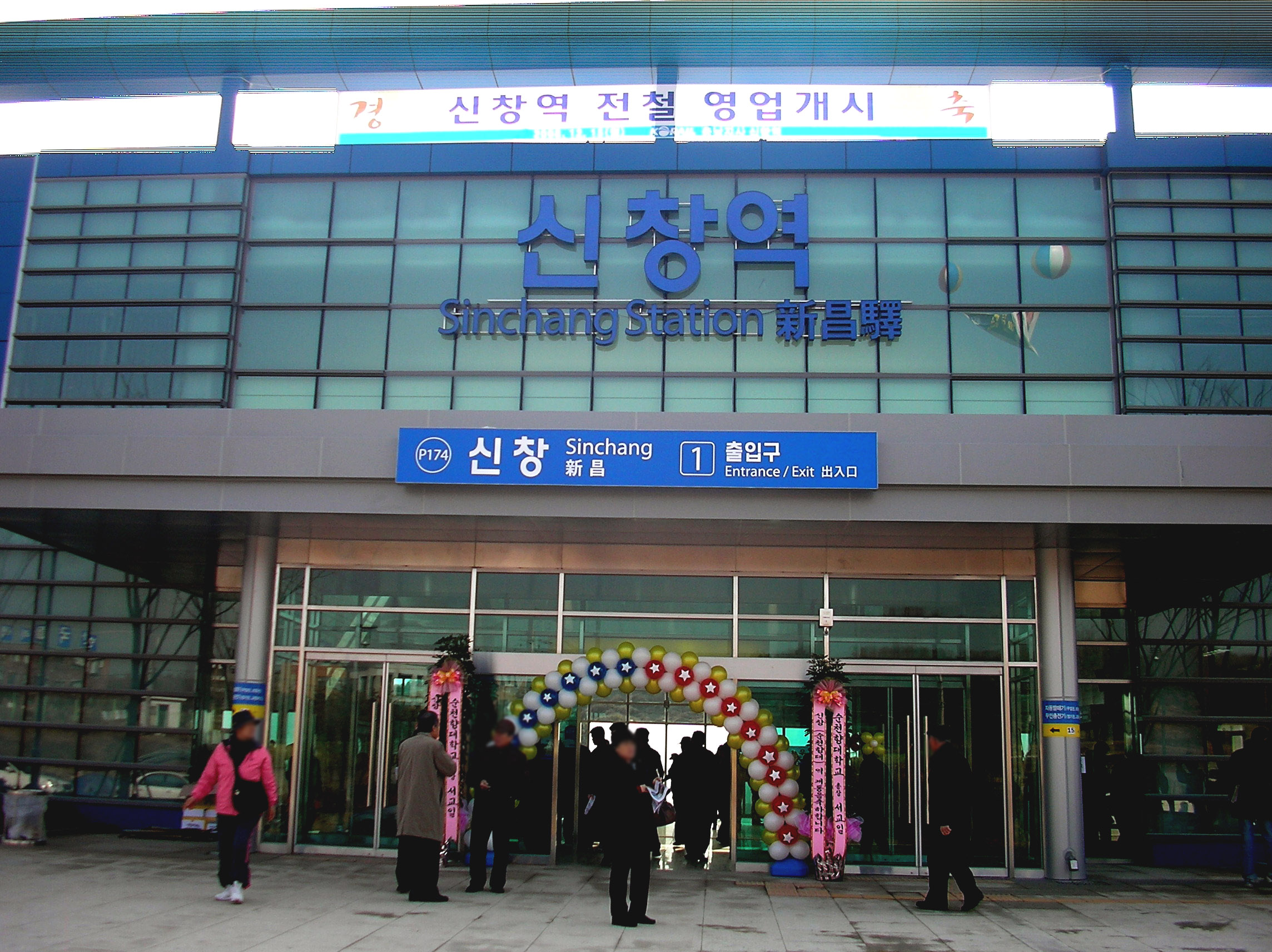

Korean name
- Hangul: 신창역
- Hanja: 新昌驛
- Revised Romanization: Sinchang-yeok
- McCune–Reischauer: Sinch'ang-yŏk

General information
- Location: 346-7 Haengmongni, Sinchang-myeon, Asan-si, Chungcheongnam-do
- Coordinates: 36°46′10.66″N 126°57′2.92″E
- Operator: Korail
- Line: Janghang Line
- Platforms: 2
- Tracks: 4

Construction
- Structure type: Aboveground

History
- Opened: June 15, 1922

Key dates
- December 15, 2008: Line 1 opened

Passengers
- (Daily) Based on Jan-Dec of 2012. KR: 705; Line 1: 4,463
Services
Preceding station	Seoul Metropolitan Subway	Following station
Onyangoncheon towards Kwangwoon University	Line 1	Terminus
Onyangoncheon towards Cheongnyangni or Seoul	Line 1 Gyeongbu Express	Terminus
Preceding station	Korail	Following station
Onyangoncheon towards Yongsan	ITX-Maum Janghang Line	Sillyewon towards Hongseong
Location

Sinchang station is a railway station on Seoul Metropolitan Subway Line 1 and the Janghang Line in Asan, South Korea. It is the southern terminus for metro trains on Line 1.
