= Port of Gunsan =

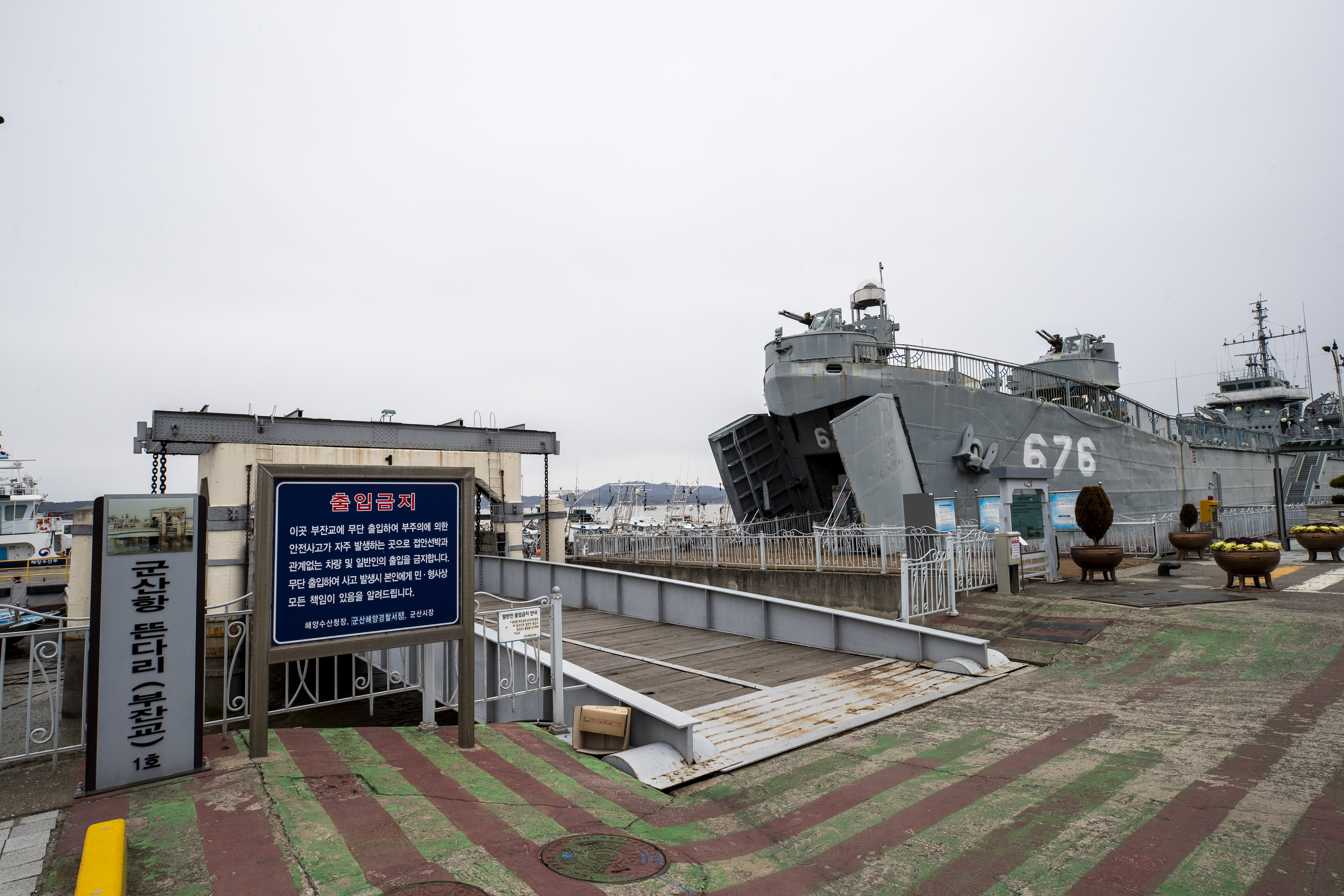
- Interactive map of Port of Gunsan

Location
- Country: South Korea
- Location: Gunsan, North Jeolla
- Coordinates: 36°N 126.7°E
- UN/LOCODE: KRKUV

The Port of Gunsan (Korean: 군산항; Hanja: 群山港) is a port in South Korea, located in the city of Gunsan, North Jeolla Province.
