= Asan =

City in South Chungcheong, South Korea

- Municipal City
- Panoramic view of the Blue Crystal Village in Asan

- Flag

- Location in South Korea
- Coordinates: 36°47′N 126°59′E
- Country: South Korea
- Region: Hoseo
- Administrative divisions: 2 eup, 9 myeon, 6 dong

Government
  - Mayor: Se-hyun Oh (오세현)

Area
  - Municipal City: 542.25 km^{2} (209.36 sq mi)
  - Urban: 42.29 km^{2} (16.33 sq mi)

Population (September 2024)
  - Municipal City: 353,603
  - Density: 529.41/km^{2} (1,371.2/sq mi)
  - Dialect: Chungcheong
- Time zone: UTC+9 (Korea Standard Time)
- Website: asan.go.kr

Korean name
- Hangul: 아산시
- Hanja: 牙山市
- RR: Asan-si
- MR: Asan-si

Asan (Korean: 아산; Korean pronunciation: [a.san]) is a city in South Chungcheong Province, South Korea. It borders the Seoul Capital Area to the north. Asan has a population of approximately 400,000.

Asan is known for its many hot springs and is a city of spas.

Asan has grown into the neighboring village, Onyang-dong, which is also known for its hot springs.

== Climate ==
Asan has a humid continental climate (Köppen: Dwa), but can be considered a borderline humid subtropical climate (Köppen: Cwa) using the −3 °C (27 °F) isotherm.

Climate data for Asan (1995–2020 normals)
Month	Jan	Feb	Mar	Apr	May	Jun	Jul	Aug	Sep	Oct	Nov	Dec	Year
Mean daily maximum °C (°F)	2.6 (36.7)	5.2 (41.4)	11.5 (52.7)	18.3 (64.9)	24.1 (75.4)	27.8 (82.0)	29.8 (85.6)	30.8 (87.4)	26.5 (79.7)	20.5 (68.9)	12.6 (54.7)	4.8 (40.6)	17.9 (64.2)
Daily mean °C (°F)	−1.9 (28.6)	0.2 (32.4)	5.4 (41.7)	11.7 (53.1)	17.7 (63.9)	22.0 (71.6)	25.2 (77.4)	26.0 (78.8)	21.1 (70.0)	14.5 (58.1)	7.3 (45.1)	0.3 (32.5)	12.5 (54.5)
Mean daily minimum °C (°F)	−6.3 (20.7)	−4.3 (24.3)	0.2 (32.4)	6.2 (43.2)	12.6 (54.7)	17.9 (64.2)	22.0 (71.6)	22.5 (72.5)	16.8 (62.2)	9.1 (48.4)	2.4 (36.3)	−4.0 (24.8)	7.9 (46.2)
Average precipitation mm (inches)	16.2 (0.64)	23.4 (0.92)	31.9 (1.26)	64.5 (2.54)	73.3 (2.89)	105.7 (4.16)	289.3 (11.39)	273.8 (10.78)	144.2 (5.68)	46.9 (1.85)	44.2 (1.74)	19.5 (0.77)	1,132.9 (44.60)
Average precipitation days (≥ 0.1 mm)	4.6	4.1	5.3	6.9	6.3	6.9	12.7	11.8	7.9	5.0	8.1	5.9	85.5
Source: Korea Meteorological Administration

== Transportation ==
The city of Asan shares a station for the KTX high speed trains with the directly adjacent city of Cheonan, which is thus named Cheonan-Asan Station. It takes about 30 minutes to travel from Asan to Seoul by the KTX train. It can be reached within 2 hours from Incheon International Airport by car. Seoul Metropolitan Subway extended one of its lines to service Asan on 15 December 2008. Two major highways, the Seoul-Busan and West Coast expressways, also pass through Asan.

== Economy ==
It is the largest manufacturing base in Chungnam. Samsung Electronics' semiconductor division Onyang Campus, Samsung Display's Asan Campus (formerly Tangjeong Campus) and Corning Precision Materials are located in Tangjeong, and in Inju-myeon, Hyundai's Asan Plant and the surrounding Inju Industrial Complex are active in automotive manufacturing. Samsung Electronics and Hyundai Motor, as well as Hyundai Mobis, KCC, and Hanwha Group operate factories in Asan. In addition to these large factories, Asan is also home to many medium-sized companies, including Sindorico, HL Mando, Yusung Corporation, Nongshim, and Dongseong Pharmaceuticals.

Agriculture is present, but its share has been declining over the years, and unlike its neighbours Cheonan, Seosan, and Gongju, it does not have a standout speciality. Rice is the most prolific speciality, with sweet potatoes, potatoes, soybeans, wheat, barley, corn, Chinese cabbage, cucumbers, tomatoes, green onions, pears, grapes, and apples. Radishes, carrots, ginseng, and leaf tobacco are also grown, but not as much as the previous ones.

The livestock industry is active due to the development of hilly terrain suitable for livestock farming, and as in other regions, there is a trend of increasing scale and professionalisation, with fewer small-scale livestock farmers but more animals.

In terms of fisheries, fishing and salt-making used to take place along the coast of Asan Bay, but after the construction of the Asan Bay Sea Wall and the Sapgyo Creek Sea Wall, fishing gradually declined and salt-making disappeared. Today, inland fishing is mainly based on Asan Lake, and eel farming is carried out in Sinchang-myeon and Seonjang-myeon.

== Companies with factories in Asan ==
Companies like Hyundai Motor, Samsung LCD, and Samsung Electronic have factories in Asan. A total of 14 industrial complexes are currently occupied by auto parts, electronic parts and other factories.

The Port of Pyeongtaek, closest to the east China coast among Korean ports, is nearby.

== Places of interest in Asan ==
Blue Crystal Village: The Mediterranean village is located in Tangjeong-myeon. This place, which was first a vineyard, was created as a new village with the construction of an industrial complex. The white walls and blue roofs of Santorini, Greece, are intact, and create exotic landscapes based on the architectural style of European architecture.

== Education ==
Asan is the home of five universities.

- Hoseo University
- Asan Information and Technology Polytechnic College
- Seonam University
- Soonchunhyang University
- Sun Moon University
- Korean National Police University

Domestic secondary schools:

- Onyang High School

International schools:

- Onyang Chinese Elementary School (溫陽華僑小學校/온양화교소학교)

== Sport ==
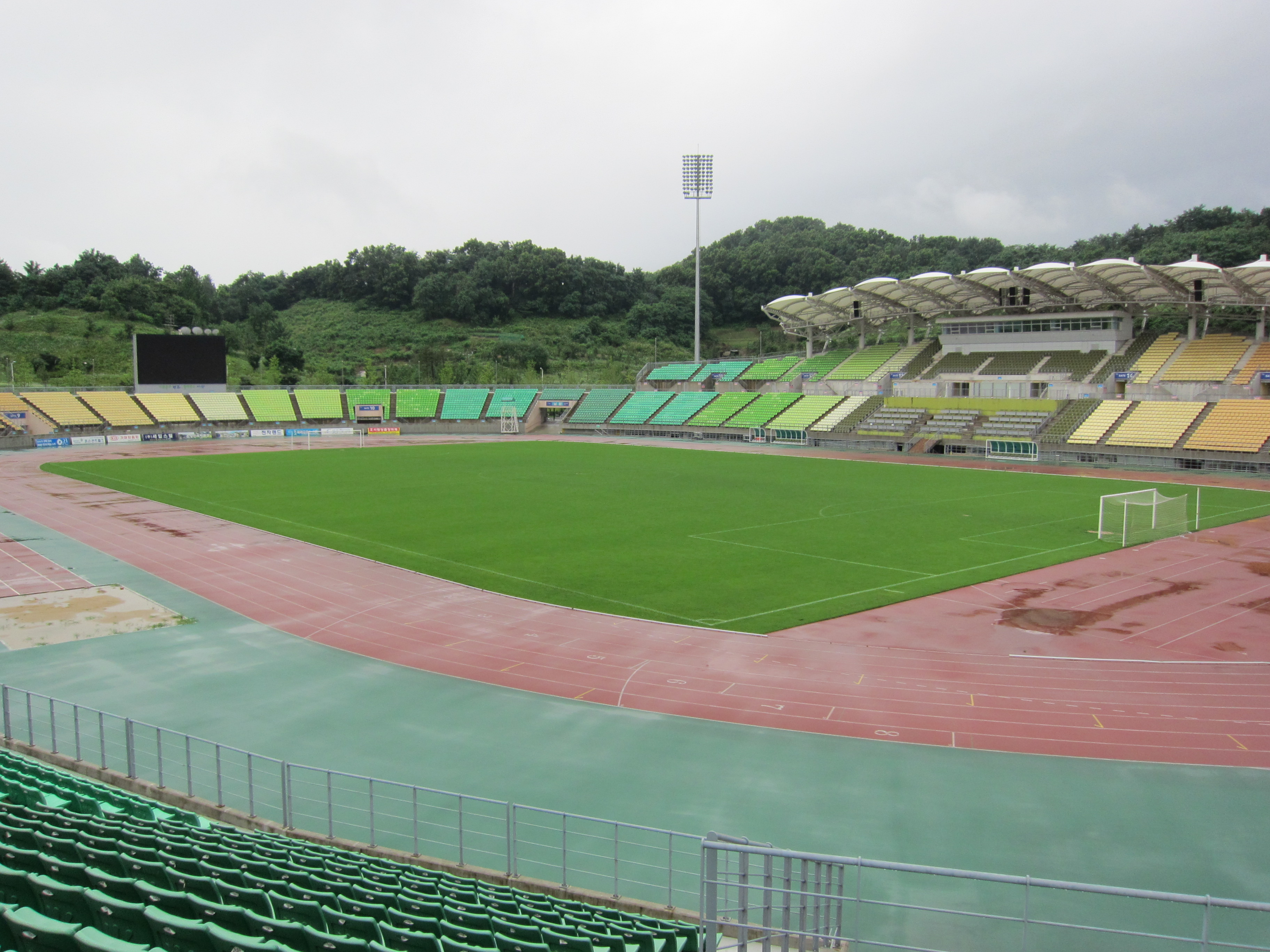
Yi Sun-sin Stadium

Asan is home of Asan Woori Bank Woori Won, a women's basketball team competing in the Women's Korean Basketball League. In 2016, the club was relocated from Chuncheon to Asan. K League 2 football club Asan Mugunghwa FC was based in the city from 2017 to 2019 before disbanding after the 2019 season. After the disbandment of Asan Mugunghwa, Chungnam Asan FC became the city's professional football club and plays in the K League 2.

== Modern history ==
- In 1983, an alteration of townships (ri) and towns (myeon) was made.
- In 1986, Onyang eup (town) of Asan was separated and the independent city of Onyang was created.
- In 1995, the City of Onyang and Asan County were combined into the City of Asan.

== Notable people ==
People born in Asan include:

- An Gyeong-ja (born 1950), volleyball player
- An Hye-jin (1998), volleyball player
- Bok Geo-il (born 1946), novelist and poet
- Seung-Hui Cho (1984–2007), perpetrator of the Virginia Tech shooting
- Queen Inseon (1619–1674), queen consort
- Jang Dong-min (born 1979), comedian
- Da Un Jung (born 1993), mixed martial artist
- Lee O-young (1934–2022), critic and novelist
- Lee So-young (born 1994), volleyball player
- Lee Young-ja (born 1967), comedian and television presenter
- Jhoon Rhee (1932–2018), taekwondo master
- Ri Ki-yong (1896–1984), novelist
- Ryoo Seung-bum (born 1980), actor
- Shin Su-jong (born 1988), swimmer
- Yun Chi-ho (1864–1945), political activist
- Yun Chi-sung (1875–1936), imperial general and politician; cousin of Chi-ho
- Yun Chi-oh (1869–1950), educator and politician; brother of Chi-ho
- Yun Yeong-ryeol (1854–1939), politician and soldier
- Seo Woo, actor
- Yi Sunsin, The city is home to Hyeonchungsa, a shrine dedicated to Admiral Yi Sun-sin, and recognizes him as a prominent figure representing Asan. Each year, the city hosts the Great Admiral Yi Sun-sin Festival to honor his legacy.
- Ryoo Seung-wan, A film director from South Korea.
- Yoon Bo-Seon, The 4th president of south Korea
- Maeng Sa-seong (1360-1438), Scholars, politicians, and Confucian scholars of the late Goryeo and early Joseon periods
- Lee O-young (born 1933), Korean national literature scholars, novelists, literary critics, journalists, members of social organizations, political appointees, and politicians.
- Eum Moon-suk (born 1982), actor

== Twin towns – sister cities ==
- Petaling Jaya, Malaysia
- Lansing, United States

== See also ==
- List of cities in South Korea
