= 2010 Suwon Samsung Bluewings season =

Suwon Bluewings
2010 season
- Chairman: Choi Gee-sung
- Head Coach: Cha Bum-Kun; Yoon Sung-Hyo
- Stadium: Big Bird
- K-League: 7th
- FA Cup: Winners
- League Cup: Semifinals
- Champions League: Quarterfinals
- Top goalscorer: League: José Mota (5); All: José Mota (18)
Home colours	Away colours

The 2010 Suwon Samsung Bluewings season was the Suwon Samsung Bluewings' fifteenth season in the South Korean K-League. The team competed in the K-League, League Cup, Korean FA Cup and the AFC Champions League as FA Cup winners.

== Squad ==
Note: Flags indicate national team as defined under FIFA eligibility rules; some limited exceptions apply. Players may hold more than one non-FIFA nationality.

No.	Pos.	Nation	Player
1	GK	KOR	Lee Woon-Jae
3	FW	KOR	Shin Young-Rok
4	MF	KOR	Kim Do-Heon
5	DF	CHN	Li Weifeng
6	DF	KOR	Cho Won-Hee (C, on loan from Wigan)
7	FW	KOR	Lee Sang-ho
8	MF	BRA	Márcio Diogo (on loan from Cruzeiro)
9	FW	BRA	José Mota (on loan from Molde)
10	FW	KOR	Ha Tae-Goon
11	MF	KOR	Park Jong-Jin
12	FW	KOR	Lee Hyun-Jin
13	MF	KOR	Lee Kwan-Woo
14	DF	KOR	Kang Min-Soo
15	MF	KOR	Hong Soon-Hak
16	DF	KOR	Lee Dong-Sik
17	DF	KOR	Oh Jae-Seok
18	FW	KOR	Yeo Seung-Won
19	FW	KOR	Kim Dae-Eui
20	MF	KOR	Baek Ji-Hoon
21	GK	KOR	Kim Dae-Hwan
22	FW	JPN	Naohiro Takahara

No.	Pos.	Nation	Player
23	DF	KOR	Yang Joon-A
24	MF	KOR	Kim Hong-Il
25	DF	KOR	Choi Sung-Hwan
26	FW	KOR	Yeom Ki-Hun
27	FW	KOR	Im Kyung-Hyun
28	DF	KOR	Yang Sang-Min
29	DF	KOR	Kwak Hee-Ju
30	FW	KOR	Namgoong Woong
31	GK	KOR	Park Ho-Jin
32	DF	KOR	Moon Min-Kwi
33	MF	KOR	Park Tae-Min
34	MF	KOR	Bae Dae-Won
35	DF	KOR	Lim Young-Woo
36	DF	KOR	Kim Seon-Il
37	DF	KOR	Joo Jae-Hyun
38	DF	KOR	Heo Jae-Won
39	DF	KOR	Min Sang-Gi
40	GK	KOR	Ha Kang-Jin
41	GK	KOR	Park Ji-Young
42	DF	KOR	Hwang Jae-Won

== K-League ==
Date	Opponents	H / A	Result F – A	Scorers	Attendance	League position
27 February	Jeonbuk Hyundai Motors	A	1–3	Cho Won-Hee 4'	18,207	13th
6 March	Busan I'Park	H	4–3	Jose Mota 28', 39', Seo Dong-Hyun 47', 52'	23,435	9th
19 March	Incheon United	H	2–1	Juninho 45', 75'	21,023	8th
28 March	Gyeongnam FC	A	1–2	Juninho 65'(pen)	12,934	9th
4 April	FC Seoul	A	1–3	Kang Min-Soo 47'	48,558	9th
9 April	Seongnam Ilhwa Chunma	H	1–2	Ha Tae-Goon 72'	18,241	10th
18 April	Jeju United	A	1–2	Own goal 84'	2,168	12th
24 April	Gangwon FC	H	1–2	Kwak Hee-Joo 71'	22,915	14th
1 May	Chunnam Dragons	A	0–2		9,856	15th
5 May	Daejeon Citizen	H	0–0		38,352	15th
8 May	Ulsan Hyundai	H	0–2		27,153	15th
18 July	Daegu FC	A	3–1	Baek Ji-Hoon 12', Jose Mota 66', 74'	2,737	11th
25 July	Pohang Steelers	A	1–1	Lee Hyun-Jin 61'	12,624	11th
31 July	Gwangju Sangmu	H	2–0	Hwang Jae-Won 2', Shin Young-Rok 52'	22,326	10th
7 August	Incheon United	A	3–2	Own goal 37', Baek Ji-Hoon 41', Lee Hyun-Jin 61'	10,083	9th
14 August	Ulsan Hyundai	A	3–2	Márcio 52', Lee Hyun-Jin 71', Shin Young-Rok 74'	11,543	8th
21 August	Daegu FC	H	2–1	Shin Young-Rok 31', Kim Do-Heon 65'	19,121	8th
28 August	FC Seoul	H	4–2	Own goal 3', Lee Sang-ho 26', Takahara 84', 90'	42,377	8th
1 September	Seongnam Ilhwa Chunma	A	0–0		3,986	7th
4 September	Gangwon FC	A	2–1	Jose Mota 64', Takahara 74'	14,952	6th
11 September	Jeju United	H	0–3		25,031	7th
18 September	Gyeongnam FC	H	0–2		24,157	7th
26 September	Gwangju Sangmu	A	1–1	Takahara 42'(pen)	1,756	7th
9 October	Chunnam Dragons	H	1–0	Li Weifeng 19'	24,176	7th
27 October	Busan I'Park	A	1–0	Kim Do-Heon 29'	2,649	7th
31 October	Pohang Steelers	H	2–0	Jose Mota 72', 90'	26,256	7th
3 November	Daejeon Citizen	A	1–1	Hwang Jae-Won 47'	12,131	7th
7 November	Jeonbuk Hyundai Motors	H	1–5	Kwak Hee-Ju 85'	31,718	7th

Pos	Team	Pld	W	D	L	GF	GA	GD	Pts	Qualification
5	Seongnam Ilhwa Chunma	28	13	9	6	46	26	+20	48	Qualification for the playoffs first round
6	Gyeongnam FC	28	13	9	6	41	32	+9	48	Qualification for the playoffs first round
7	Suwon Samsung Bluewings	28	12	5	11	39	44	−5	41	Qualification for the Champions League (Note: Qualified as champions of the FA Cup.)
8	Busan IPark	28	8	9	11	36	37	−1	33	
9	Pohang Steelers	28	8	9	11	39	48	−9	33	

Source: K League (in Korean)
Rules for classification: 1) Points; 2) Goal difference; 3) Goals scored
Notes:

Pos	Team	Qualification
1	FC Seoul (C)	Qualification for the Champions League
2	Jeju United	Qualification for the Champions League
3	Jeonbuk Hyundai Motors	Qualification for the Champions League
4	Seongnam Ilhwa Chunma	
5	Ulsan Hyundai	
6	Gyeongnam FC	

Source: RSSSF
(C) Champions

== Korean FA Cup ==
Date	Round	Opponents	H / A	Result F – A	Scorers	Attendance
21 April	Round of 32	Dongguk University	H	2–0	Juninho 50', 60'	1,100
21 July	Round of 16	Suwon City	H	4–1	Own goal 1', Lee Sang-ho 33', Baek Ji-Hoon 55', 85'	7,824
18 August	Quarterfinal	Jeonbuk Hyundai Motors	H	2–0	Kwak Hee-Joo 36', Yeom Ki-Hun 90+4'	12,987
29 September	Semifinal	Jeju United	H	0–0 (AET, 4–2p)		8,115
24 October	Final	Busan I'Park	A	1–0	Yeom Ki-Hun 26'	31,141

== League Cup ==
=== Group stage ===
Date	Opponents	H / A	Result F – A	Scorers	Attendance	Group position
22 May	Chunnam Dragons	A	3 – 2	Kwak Hee-Joo 25', Jose Mota 27', 61'	9,575	1st
29 May	Gangwon FC	H	2 – 0	Kang Min-Soo 8', Lee Sang-don 58'	18,277	2nd
2 June	Gyeongnam FC	A	1 – 4	Jose Mota 82'	7,914	3rd
6 June	Jeonbuk Hyundai Motors	H	1 – 3	Heo Jae-Won 47'	16,269	3rd

Pos	Team	Pld	W	D	L	GF	GA	GD	Pts	JHM	GNM	SSB	JND	GWN
1	Jeonbuk Hyundai Motors	4	3	1	0	10	4	+6	10	—	2–1	—	1–1	—
2	Gyeongnam FC	4	3	0	1	8	4	+4	9	—	—	4–1	1–0	—
3	Suwon Samsung Bluewings	4	2	0	2	7	9	−2	6	1–3	—	—	—	2–0
4	Jeonnam Dragons	4	1	1	2	6	5	+1	4	—	—	2–3	—	3–0
5	Gangwon FC	4	0	0	4	2	11	−9	0	1–4	1–2	—	—	—

Source: RSSSF

=== Knockout stage ===
Date	Round	Opponents	H / A	Result F – A	Scorers	Attendance
14 July	Quarterfinal	Busan I'Park	A	3–3 (AET, 6–5p)	Ha Tae-Goon 23', Kim Do-Heon 64', Jose Mota 103'	3,127
28 July	Semifinal	FC Seoul	A	2–4 (AET)	Own goal 62', Yeom Ki-Hun 72'	21,036

== Champions League ==
=== Group stage ===
Date	Opponents	H / A	Result F – A	Scorers	Attendance	Group position
24 February 2010	(Japan) Gamba Osaka	H	0 – 0		17,264	1st
10 March 2010	Singapore Armed Forces	A	2 – 0	Juninho 45+1', Jose Mota 72'	2,674	1st
23 March 2010	(China) Henan Construction	A	2 – 0	Jose Mota 47', 59'	20,666	1st
31 March 2010	(China) Henan Construction	H	2 – 0	Jose Mota 11', Kim Dae-Eui 90+1'	11,456	1st
13 April 2010	(Japan) Gamba Osaka	A	1 – 2	Jose Mota 58'	12,311	2nd
27 April 2010	Singapore Armed Forces	H	6 – 2	Jose Mota 11', 38', Lee Hyun-Jin 13', Kwak Hee-Joo 28', Yeom Ki-Hun 46', 90'	2,963	1st

Pos	Team	Pld	W	D	L	GF	GA	GD	Pts	Qualification
1	(South Korea) Suwon Samsung Bluewings	6	4	1	1	13	4	+9	13	Advance to knockout stage
2	(Japan) Gamba Osaka	6	3	3	0	11	5	+6	12	Advance to knockout stage
3	Singapore Armed Forces	6	1	1	4	6	16	−10	4	
4	(China) Henan Jianye	6	0	3	3	3	8	−5	3	

Source: AFC Champions League Official Page

=== Knockout stage ===
Date	Round	Opponents	H / A	Result F – A	Scorers	Attendance
11 May 2010	Round of 16	(China) Beijing Guoan	H	2 – 0	Jose Mota 28', 85'	5,693
15 September 2010	Quarterfinal 1st leg	(South Korea) Seongnam Ilhwa Chunma	A	1 – 4	Yeom Ki-Hun 17'	7,462
21 September 2010	Quarterfinal 2nd leg	(South Korea) Seongnam Ilhwa Chunma	H	2 – 0	Yeom Ki-Hun 32', Lee Sang-ho 59'	13,076

== Squad statistics ==
=== Appearances and goals ===
Statistics accurate as of match played 7 November 2010

No.	Nat.	Pos.	Name	League		FA Cup		League Cup		Asia		Appearances		Goals
No.	Nat.	Pos.	Name	Apps	Goals	Apps	Goals	Apps	Goals	Apps	Goals	App (sub)	Total	Goals
1	(South Korea)	GK	Lee Woon-Jae (C)	12	0	2	0	2	0	7	0	23 (0)	23	0
3	(South Korea)	FW	Shin Young-Rok	8	3	3	0	0 (1)	0	1 (1)	0	12 (2)	14	3
4	(South Korea)	MF	Kim Do-Heon	14 (2)	2	3	0	2 (1)	1	2 (2)	0	21 (5)	26	3
5	(China)	DF	Li Weifeng	24	1	5	0	5	0	9	0	43 (0)	43	1
6	(South Korea)	MF	Cho Won-Hee	17 (1)	1	3	0	6	0	8	0	36 (1)	37	1
7	(South Korea)	MF	Lee Sang-ho	15	1	3	1	3 (2)	0	2 (1)	1	23 (3)	26	3
8	(Brazil)	MF	Márcio Diogo	2 (6)	1	0 (2)	0	0	0	0 (1)	0	2 (9)	11	1
9	(Brazil)	FW	Jose Mota	11 (8)	7	0 (4)	0	3 (3)	4	8	9	22 (15)	37	20
10	(South Korea)	FW	Ha Tae-Goon	4 (7)	1	1 (1)	0	2 (2)	1	2 (2)	0	9 (12)	21	2
11	(South Korea)	MF	Park Jong-Jin	9 (2)	0	1	0	0 (1)	0	0	0	10 (3)	13	0
12	(South Korea)	FW	Lee Hyun-Jin	5 (16)	3	0 (2)	0	1 (3)	0	3 (3)	1	9 (24)	33	4
13	(South Korea)	MF	Lee Kwan-Woo	1	0	0	0	4	0	0	0	5 (0)	5	0
14	(South Korea)	DF	Kang Min-Soo	20	1	2	0	4	1	5	0	31 (0)	31	2
15	(South Korea)	MF	Hong Soon-Hak	8 (4)	0	3 (1)	0	0	0	0 (1)	0	11 (6)	17	0
16	(South Korea)	DF	Lee Dong-Sik	3 (1)	0	0	0	0	0	1 (1)	0	4 (2)	6	0
17	(South Korea)	DF	Oh Jae-Seok	4 (1)	0	2 (1)	0	1 (1)	0	2	0	9 (3)	12	0
18	(South Korea)	FW	Yeo Seung-Won	2 (3)	0	1	0	0	0	1 (1)	0	4 (4)	8	0
19	(South Korea)	FW	Kim Dae-Eui	2 (5)	0	2	0	3 (1)	0	3 (1)	1	10 (7)	17	1
20	(South Korea)	MF	Baek Ji-Hoon	8 (1)	2	2	2	4 (2)	0	4 (2)	0	18 (5)	23	4
21	(South Korea)	GK	Kim Dae-Hwan	2	0	0	0	4	0	1	0	7 (0)	7	0
22	(Japan)	MF	Naohiro Takahara	11 (1)	4	1 (1)	0	0	0	0 (1)	0	12 (3)	15	4
23	(South Korea)	DF	Yang Joon-A	6 (3)	0	0	0	0	0	2 (2)	0	8 (5)	13	0
24	(South Korea)	MF	Kim Hong-Il	0	0	0	0	0	0	0	0	0	0	0
25	(South Korea)	DF	Choi Sung-Hwan	5 (2)	0	2 (1)	0	2 (2)	0	0 (1)	0	9 (6)	15	0
26	(South Korea)	FW	Yeom Ki-Hun	14 (2)	0	4	2	2	1	3 (1)	4	23 (3)	26	7
27	(South Korea)	FW	Im Kyung-Hyun	3 (2)	0	0	0	1	0	1	0	5 (2)	7	0
28	(South Korea)	DF	Yang Sang-Min	19 (1)	0	3 (1)	0	3	0	6 (1)	0	31 (3)	34	0
29	(South Korea)	DF	Kwak Hee-Ju	22	2	4	1	4	1	8 (1)	1	38 (1)	39	5
30	(South Korea)	FW	Namgoong Woong	0	0	0	0	0	0	0	0	0	0	0
31	(South Korea)	GK	Park Ho-Jin	0	0	0	0	0	0	0	0	0	0	0
32	(South Korea)	DF	Moon Min-Kwi	4	0	1	0	0	0	0	0	5 (0)	5	0
33	(South Korea)	MF	Park Tae-Min	1 (1)	0	0	0	0	0	1	0	2 (1)	3	0
34	(South Korea)	MF	Bae Dae-Won	0	0	0	0	0	0	0	0	0	0	0
35	(South Korea)	DF	Lim Young-Woo	0	0	0	0	0	0	0	0	0	0	0
36	(South Korea)	DF	Kim Seon-Il	0	0	0	0	0	0	0	0	0	0	0
37	(South Korea)	DF	Joo Jae-Hyun	0	0	0	0	0	0	0	0	0	0	0
38	(South Korea)	DF	Heo Jae-Won	0 (1)	0	0	0	1	1	1	0	2 (1)	3	1
39	(South Korea)	DF	Min Sang-Gi	0	0	0	0	1	0	0	0	1 (0)	1	0
40	(South Korea)	GK	Ha Kang-Jin	14	0	3	0	0	0	1	0	18 (0)	18	0
41	(South Korea)	GK	Park Ji-Young	0	0	0	0	0	0	0	0	0	0	0
42	(South Korea)	DF	Hwang Jae-Won	9	2	2	0	0	0	2	0	13 (0)	13	2
3	(Brazil)	DF	Juninho (out)	8 (3)	3	0 (1)	2	0 (2)	0	4	1	12 (6)	18	6
8	(South Korea)	MF	Song Chong-Gug (out)	5 (2)	0	1	0	3	0	5 (1)	0	14 (3)	17	0
11	(Brazil)	MF	Reinaldo (out)	3 (1)	0	0	0	0	0	1	0	4 (1)	5	0
22	(South Korea)	MF	Lee Kil-Hoon (out)	5	0	0	0	0	0	2 (1)	0	7 (1)	8	0
27	(South Korea)	FW	Seo Dong-Hyun (out)	4 (5)	2	1	0	2 (1)	0	3 (1)	0	10 (7)	17	2
42	(South Korea)	MF	Lee Sang-don (out)	2	0	0	0	3	1	0	0	5 (0)	5	1

=== Top scorers ===
Position	Nation	Number	Name	K-League	KFA Cup	League Cup	Champions League	Total
1	(Brazil)	9	José Mota	7	0	4	9	20
2	(South Korea)	26	Yeom Ki-Hun	0	2	1	4	7
3	(Brazil)	3	Juninho	3	2	0	1	6
4	(South Korea)	29	Kwak Hee-Joo	2	1	1	1	5
5	(Japan)	22	Naohiro Takahara	4	0	0	0	4
=	(South Korea)	12	Lee Hyun-Jin	3	0	0	1	4
=	(South Korea)	20	Baek Ji-Hoon	2	2	0	0	4
6	(South Korea)	3	Shin Young-Rok	3	0	0	0	3
=	(South Korea)	4	Kim Do-Heon	2	0	1	0	3
=	(South Korea)	7	Lee Sang-ho	1	1	0	1	3
7	(South Korea)	27	Seo Dong-Hyun	2	0	0	0	2
=	(South Korea)	42	Hwang Jae-Won	2	0	0	0	2
=	(South Korea)	10	Ha Tae-Goon	1	0	1	0	2
=	(South Korea)	14	Kang Min-Soo	1	0	1	0	2
8	(China)	5	Li Weifeng	1	0	0	0	1
=	(South Korea)	6	Cho Won-Hee	1	0	0	0	1
=	(Brazil)	8	Márcio	1	0	0	0	1
=	(South Korea)	19	Kim Dae-Eui	0	0	0	1	1
=	(South Korea)	38	Heo Jae-Won	0	0	1	0	1
=	(South Korea)	42	Lee Sang-don	0	0	1	0	1
/	/	/	Own Goals	3	1	1	0	5
			TOTALS	39	9	12	18	78

=== Discipline ===
Position	Nation	Number	Name	K-League		KFA Cup		League Cup		Champions League		Total	
Position	Nation	Number	Name	Booked	Sent off (straight red)	Booked	Sent off (straight red)	Booked	Sent off (straight red)	Booked	Sent off (straight red)	Booked	Sent off (straight red)
DF	(Brazil)	3	Juninho	2	0	0	0	0	0	0	0	2	0
FW	(South Korea)	3	Shin Young-Rok	3	0	0	0	0	0	0	0	3	0
MF	(South Korea)	4	Kim Do-Heon	4	0	0	0	0	0	0	0	4	0
DF	(China)	5	Li Weifeng	6	0	2	0	3	0	1	0	12	0
MF	(South Korea)	6	Cho Won-Hee	2	0	0	0	0	0	1	0	3	0
MF	(South Korea)	7	Lee Sang-ho	1	0	0	0	2	0	0	0	3	0
MF	(South Korea)	8	Song Jong-Gug	1	0	0	0	0	0	0	0	1	0
FW	(Brazil)	9	Jose Mota	4	1	0	0	1	0	1	0	6	1
FW	(South Korea)	10	Ha Tae-Goon	1	0	0	0	0	0	0	0	1	0
MF	(South Korea)	12	Lee Hyun-Jin	2	0	0	0	1	0	0	0	3	0
MF	(South Korea)	13	Lee Kwan-Woo	0	0	0	0	2	0	0	0	2	0
DF	(South Korea)	14	Kang Min-Soo	5	0	2	0	1	0	1	0	9	0
MF	(South Korea)	15	Hong Soon-Hak	1	0	2	0	0	0	0	0	3	0
MF	(South Korea)	16	Lee Dong-Sik	1	0	0	0	0	0	0	0	1	0
DF	(South Korea)	17	Oh Jae-Seok	1	0	0	0	0	0	0	0	1	0
MF	(South Korea)	19	Kim Dae-Eui	0	0	0	0	1	0	0	0	1	0
MF	(South Korea)	20	Baek Ji-Hoon	0	0	0	0	1	0	0	0	1	0
MF	(Japan)	22	Naohiro Takahara	1	0	0	0	0	0	0	0	1	0
DF	(South Korea)	23	Yang Joon-A	3	0	0	0	0	0	0	0	3	0
DF	(South Korea)	25	Choi Sung-Hwan	1	0	1	0	1	0	0	0	3	0
FW	(South Korea)	27	Seo Dong-Hyun	2	0	0	0	2	0	0	0	4	0
FW	(South Korea)	27	Im Kyung-Hyun	2	0	0	0	0	0	0	0	2	0
DF	(South Korea)	28	Yang Sang-Min	8	1	2	0	2	0	1	0	13	1
DF	(South Korea)	29	Kwak Hee-Ju	6	0	2	1	2	0	1	0	11	1
DF	(South Korea)	32	Moon Min-Kwi	1	0	1	0	0	0	0	0	2	0
DF	(South Korea)	38	Heo Jae-Won	0	0	0	0	1	0	0	0	1	0
GK	(South Korea)	40	Ha Kang-Jin	1	0	0	0	0	0	0	0	1	0
MF	(South Korea)	42	Lee Sang-don	0	0	0	0	2	0	0	0	2	0
DF	(South Korea)	42	Hwang Jae-Won	2	0	0	0	0	0	0	0	2	0
/	/	/	TOTALS	61	2	12	1	22	0	6	0	101	3

== Honours ==
=== Club ===
- Korean FA Cup Winners

=== Individual ===
- AFC Champions League Top Scorer: (Brazil) José Mota (9 goals)
- Korean FA Cup MVP: (South Korea) Yeom Ki-Hun
