= 2009 U-League =

U-League
- Season: 2009
- Dates: 9 April – 26 November 2009
- Champions: Dankook University (1st title)
- Matches played: 148
- Goals scored: 460 (3.11 per match)
- Best Player: Bae Il-hwan
- Top goalscorer: Ko Kyung-min (10 goals)
- Best goalkeeper: Lee Jin-hyung

The 2009 U-League was the second football season of the U-League. The number of participating universities increased to 22.

== Regional round ==
=== Capital Area League ===
==== League table ====
| Pos | Team | Pld | W | D | L | GF | GA | GD | Pts | Qualification |
|---|---|---|---|---|---|---|---|---|---|---|
| 1 | Kyung Hee University | 14 | 9 | 3 | 2 | 29 | 12 | +17 | 30 | Qualification for the playoffs |
| 2 | Korea University | 14 | 9 | 2 | 3 | 28 | 15 | +13 | 29 | Qualification for the playoffs |
| 3 | Yonsei University | 14 | 7 | 3 | 4 | 38 | 15 | +23 | 24 | Qualification for the playoffs |
| 4 | Chung-Ang University | 14 | 7 | 2 | 5 | 19 | 14 | +5 | 23 | |
| 5 | University of Suwon | 14 | 6 | 2 | 6 | 21 | 20 | +1 | 20 | |
| 6 | Hanyang University | 14 | 4 | 5 | 5 | 26 | 18 | +8 | 17 | |
| 7 | Myongji University | 14 | 4 | 3 | 7 | 18 | 19 | −1 | 15 | |
| 8 | Seoul National University | 14 | 0 | 0 | 14 | 6 | 72 | −66 | 0 | |

Source: Korea Football Association (in Korean)
Rules for classification: 1) Points; 2) Goal difference; 3) Goals scored.

==== Results ====
| Home \ Away | CAU | HYU | KRU | KHU | MJU | SNU | USW | YSU |
|---|---|---|---|---|---|---|---|---|
| Chung-Ang University | — | 2–1 | 1–2 | 1–2 | 0–1 | 6–1 | 3–2 | 0–1 |
| Hanyang University | 2–0 | — | 2–2 | 1–1 | 0–0 | 3–0 | 5–0 | 1–1 |
| Korea University | 0–1 | 1–0 | — | 2–4 | 0–1 | 4–0 | 1–1 | 2–1 |
| Kyung Hee University | 1–1 | 2–0 | 0–1 | — | 2–1 | 7–0 | 3–2 | 2–1 |
| Myongji University | 0–1 | 2–2 | 3–4 | 0–1 | — | 1–0 | 1–2 | 0–0 |
| Seoul National University | 0–1 | 2–8 | 0–6 | 0–3 | 1–5 | — | 1–4 | 1–8 |
| University of Suwon | 0–1 | 2–0 | 0–1 | 1–1 | 2–0 | 3–0 | — | 1–0 |
| Yonsei University | 1–1 | 3–1 | 1–2 | 1–0 | 4–3 | 13–0 | 3–1 | — |

Source: Korea Football Association
Legend: Blue = home team win; Yellow = draw; Red = away team win.

=== Northern League ===
==== League table ====
| Pos | Team | Pld | W | D | L | GF | GA | GD | Pts | Qualification |
|---|---|---|---|---|---|---|---|---|---|---|
| 1 | Dankook University | 12 | 7 | 4 | 1 | 27 | 9 | +18 | 25 | Qualification for the playoffs |
| 2 | Halla University | 12 | 7 | 4 | 1 | 30 | 14 | +16 | 25 | Qualification for the playoffs |
| 3 | Yong-In University | 12 | 6 | 4 | 2 | 30 | 14 | +16 | 22 | Qualification for the playoffs |
| 4 | Chungbuk National University | 12 | 4 | 4 | 4 | 17 | 20 | −3 | 16 | |
| 5 | Sangji University | 12 | 4 | 2 | 6 | 19 | 20 | −1 | 14 | |
| 6 | Kwandong University | 12 | 3 | 4 | 5 | 26 | 21 | +5 | 13 | |
| 7 | Hoseo University | 12 | 0 | 0 | 12 | 3 | 54 | −51 | 0 | |

Source: Korea Football Association (in Korean)
Rules for classification: 1) Points; 2) Goal difference; 3) Goals scored.

==== Results ====
| Home \ Away | CBU | DKU | HLU | HSU | KDU | SJU | YIU |
|---|---|---|---|---|---|---|---|
| Chungbuk National University | — | 1–1 | 0–4 | 4–0 | 1–1 | 1–0 | 2–2 |
| Dankook University | 1–1 | — | 2–2 | 6–0 | 2–2 | 1–0 | 2–0 |
| Halla University | 3–2 | 2–0 | — | 5–1 | 2–2 | 3–0 | 0–4 |
| Hoseo University | 1–2 | 0–5 | 0–5 | — | 0–3 | 1–4 | 0–1 |
| Kwandong University | 1–2 | 0–2 | 1–2 | 7–0 | — | 2–3 | 2–2 |
| Sangji University | 4–1 | 0–2 | 1–1 | 3–0 | 3–2 | — | 1–1 |
| Yong-In University | 2–0 | 1–3 | 1–1 | 9–0 | 3–2 | 4–1 | — |

Source: Korea Football Association
Legend: Blue = home team win; Yellow = draw; Red = away team win.

=== Southern League ===
==== League table ====
| Pos | Team | Pld | W | D | L | GF | GA | GD | Pts | Qualification |
|---|---|---|---|---|---|---|---|---|---|---|
| 1 | Woosuk University | 12 | 6 | 3 | 3 | 21 | 13 | +8 | 21 | Qualification for the playoffs |
| 2 | Jeonju University | 12 | 6 | 3 | 3 | 17 | 11 | +6 | 21 | Qualification for the playoffs |
| 3 | Yeungnam University | 12 | 6 | 2 | 4 | 18 | 13 | +5 | 20 | |
| 4 | Pai Chai University | 12 | 4 | 4 | 4 | 11 | 13 | −2 | 16 | |
| 5 | Hannam University | 12 | 4 | 4 | 4 | 11 | 14 | −3 | 16 | |
| 6 | University of Ulsan | 12 | 4 | 2 | 6 | 14 | 14 | 0 | 14 | |
| 7 | Honam University | 12 | 2 | 2 | 8 | 11 | 25 | −14 | 8 | |

Source: Korea Football Association (in Korean)
Rules for classification: 1) Points; 2) Goal difference; 3) Goals scored.

==== Results ====
| Home \ Away | HAU | HOU | JJU | PCU | ULU | WSU | YNU |
|---|---|---|---|---|---|---|---|
| Hannam University | — | 0–3 | 0–0 | 0–0 | 1–0 | 0–2 | 2–3 |
| Honam University | 0–1 | — | 0–2 | 1–2 | 2–1 | 2–2 | 0–0 |
| Jeonju University | 1–1 | 2–0 | — | 3–3 | 1–0 | 1–0 | 1–2 |
| Pai Chai University | 1–1 | 3–1 | 0–2 | — | 0–1 | 0–0 | 1–0 |
| University of Ulsan | 1–2 | 4–0 | 2–1 | 0–1 | — | 1–1 | 2–1 |
| Woosuk University | 2–1 | 4–1 | 2–3 | 2–0 | 3–2 | — | 0–1 |
| Yeungnam University | 1–2 | 5–1 | 1–0 | 2–0 | 1–1 | 1–3 | — |

Source: Korea Football Association
Legend: Blue = home team win; Yellow = draw; Red = away team win.

== Championship playoffs ==
Quarterfinals
S1 | Woosuk University | 2 (1)
S2 | Jeonju University (p) | 2 (3)
C1 | Kyung Hee University (p) | 1 (5)
C2 | Korea University | 1 (4)
N1 | Dankook University | 2
C3 | Yonsei University | 1
N3 | Yong-In University | 3
N2 | Halla University | 1

Semifinals
Jeonju University (p) | 0 (3)
Kyung Hee University | 0 (2)
Dankook University | 1
Yong-In University | 0

Final
Jeonju University | 0 | 1 | 1
Dankook University | 0 | 4 | 4

== Awards ==
| Award | Winner | University |
|---|---|---|
| Most Valuable Player | Bae Il-hwan | Dankook University |
| Valuable Player | Park Joon-hyeok | Jeonju University |
| Top goalscorer | Ko Kyung-min | Hanyang University |
| Top assist provider | Park Dae-song | Chungbuk National University |
| Best Defender | Jeong Ji-hoon | Dankook University |
| Best Goalkeeper | Lee Jin-hyung | Dankook University |
| Fair Play Player | Kang Gyeong-gu | Jeonju University |
| Best Manager | Shin Yon-ho | Dankook University |
| Best Coach | Park Jong-gwan | Dankook University |
| Fair Play Team | Kyung Hee University | |

== See also ==
- 2009 in South Korean football
- 2009 Korean FA Cup
