= Seung-won =

- Hangul: 승원
- RR: Seungwon
- MR: Sŭngwŏn
- IPA: [sɯŋwʌn]

Seung-won, also spelled Sung-won, is a Korean given name.

== People ==
Notable people with this name include:

- Cha Seung-won (born 1970), South Korean actor
- Han Seung-won (born 1939), South Korean writer
- Lee Seung-won (born 1979), South Korean fencer
- Son Seung-won (born 1990), South Korean actor
- Yang Seung-won (born 1985), South Korean football defender (Korea National League)
- Yeo Seung-won (born 1984), South Korean football forward (K-League Classic)
- Yoon Seung-won (born 1995), South Korean football midfielder (K-League Classic)

== See also ==
- List of Korean given names
