= Cho Won-hee =

South Korean footballer

Cho Won-hee 조원희
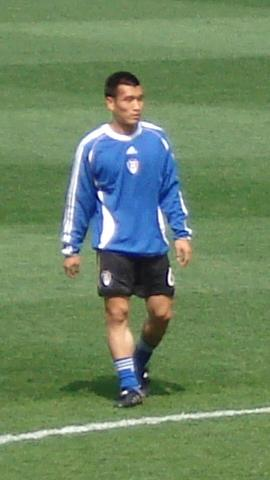

Personal information
- Full name: Cho Won-hee
- Date of birth: 17 April 1983 (age 43)
- Place of birth: Seoul, South Korea
- Height: 1.77 m (5 ft 10 in)

Senior career*
Years	Team	Apps	(Gls)
2002–2004	Ulsan Hyundai Horang-i	1	(0)
2003–2004	→ Gwangju Sangmu (army)	33	(2)
2005–2008	Suwon Samsung Bluewings	82	(1)
2009–2011	Wigan Athletic	5	(0)
2010	→ Suwon Samsung Bluewings (loan)	20	(1)
2011–2012	Guangzhou Evergrande	47	(0)
2013–2014	Wuhan Zall	29	(0)
2014	→ Gyeongnam FC (loan)	12	(0)
2014	Omiya Ardija	4	(0)
2015-2016	Seoul E-Land	37	(5)
2016–2019	Suwon Samsung Bluewings	60	(1)
2020	Suwon FC	2	(0)
Total		329	(10)

International career^{‡}
2002–2003	South Korea U20	10	(1)
2006	South Korea U23	3	(0)
2005–2009	South Korea	36	(1)
- * Club domestic league appearances and goals as of 31 March 2019 ‡ National team caps and goals as of 28 October 2012

- Cho Won-hee
- Hangul: 조원희
- Hanja: 趙源熙
- RR: Jo Wonhui
- MR: Cho Wŏnhŭi

Cho Won-hee (Korean: 조원희, Korean pronunciation: [tɕo.wʌn.ɦi]; born 17 April 1983) is a South Korean former professional footballer, who played as a right-back or a defensive midfielder. Aside of his considerably long playing time with several teams of the K League, he also experienced spells in England, China and Japan.

In his home-country, he's also known as an Internet sensation, as he runs a YouTube channel hosting special training sessions (sometimes in collaboration with fellow footballer and YouTuber Lee Min-a) and covering national and international football, as well as his own experiences as a player.

== Club career ==
=== Early starts ===
As a child and approaching the start of his senior career, Cho often played as a forward: for example, while representing South Korea in the U-20 squad, he was also sided as a left winger. In 2001, after his original plan to join a university club (a practice many Korean footballers do in order to focus on their development) failed, Cho signed with Ulsan Hyundai, one of the most successful clubs in the K League. After making his professional debut for the Horangi side, in 2003 Cho decided to join the army team Gwangju Sangmu Phoenix on a loan spell, so he could finish his military duty and play more regularly.

=== Suwon Samsung Bluewings ===
After a two-year duty at Gwangju, in 2005 Cho moved from Ulsan to Suwon Samsung Bluewings, becoming in the process one of the several prominent signings that made the team earn the nickname "Real Suwon" during the regular season of that year.

He originally played as a right wing-back or a right full-back at the Big Bird Stadium, competing for a regular spot with Song Chong-Gug: however, in 2007, due to a long-term injury of defensive midfielder Kim Nam-Il, he switched his position to replace his team-mate. Throughout that season, he didn't seem to be totally comfortable in his new position and many fans were especially concerned with his rough passing.

Nevertheless, the following season he showed great signs of improvement in his new role and became a first-team regular again, as Suwon experienced one of its best seasons to date, winning both the K League title and the Korean League Cup. At the end of the year, Cho was also featured in the Best XI of the championship (alongside team-mates Lee Woon-jae, Mato Neretljak and Edu). He chose to not renew his contract with Suwon, becoming a free agent and starting figuring out an even more ambitious move.

=== Wigan Athletic ===
Following impressive performances for both Suwon and the South Korean national team, Cho was linked with several European clubs, including German side Schalke 04 and French side AS Monaco. After trialing with the latter team in January 2009, Cho sought another trial with English Premier League side Wigan Athletic, since Monaco had actually all of their non-EU player slots filled. He impressed during his tests with the Tics and, after being granted a work permit, he was allowed to join Wigan on 6 March 2009, signing a two years, six months-long contract.

Cho initially represented the club's reserve squad, playing his first game in a 2–2 draw against Liverpool, during which he notched an assist. Some months later, he sustained a calf injury in an international friendly against Iraq: for this reason, he was supposed to miss the remainder of the season, but eventually managed to fully recover so as to make his Premier League debut for Wigan in the final match of the 2008–09 season, against Stoke City.

Overall, Cho's playing time at the English side was pretty limited, due to his injury and concurrence from other team-mates.

=== Loan back to Suwon Bluewings and departure from Wigan ===
In order to gain more playing time, Cho agreed to join Suwon Bluewings again, this time on a one-year loan spell, in January 2010.

Nominated as captain of the team, he played twenty times and scored one goal, as the Blue Wings performed well in both national and international cups (they won the Korean FA Cup, reached the semi-finals of the K-League Cup and the quarter-finals of the AFC Champions League), but finished seventh in K League.

At the end of his loan, he returned to England and then parted ways with Wigan, after the expiration of his contract: overall, he registered a modest total of five first-team appearances with the Tics, only one of which as a starter and four as a substitute.

=== Guangzhou Evergrande ===
On 13 February 2011, Cho joined Chinese Super League side Guangzhou Evergrande on a free transfer, which made him the second Korean player to play for the club after Park Ji-Ho. He was the only player to appear in all of the 30 games for Guangzhou during the 2011 season.

On 30 May 2012, Cho suffered a rib fracture in the Round of 16 of the AFC Champions League, which saw Guangzhou beat Japanese side FC Tokyo 1–0. Failing to fully recover from that injury, he eventually lost his spot in the team to fellow Korean Kim Young-Gwon, who had completed a transfer move in August of the same year.

Nevertheless, Cho still managed to play his part in the win of two consecutive league titles in 2011 and 2012 with Guangzhou, as well as the national FA Cup and Super Cup in the latter year.

=== Wuhan Zall ===
On 28 November 2012, fellow Chinese club Wuhan Zall officially announced they had signed Cho on a free transfer.

Despite being featured regularly and given the captain armband, the South Korean could not bring substantial help to the team throughout the 2013 season of the Super League, which saw Wuhan heavily struggle in their first top-tier season ever: eventually, the club finished in last place, thus being relegated to China League One after just a year from their promotion.

=== Gyeongnam FC ===
In February 2014, Cho was loaned to Gyeongnam FC, thus returning to South Korea after four years from his latest experience at the time.

During his brief period of time at Changwon, he featured twelve times, but the club struggled in K League Classic, and then lost the promotion-relegation playoff to Gwangju FC.

=== Omiya Ardija ===
On 4 July 2014, Cho moved to Japanese side Omiya Ardija until the end of the season.

However, it proved to be another unlucky experience for him, as he managed to make only four appearances due to fitness issues and could not provide the team with much help, as they finished sixteenth out of eighteen teams in J League 1, failing to stay in the top-tier for just a point: this way, the South Korean got involved in his third relegation in a row in just two years.

=== Seoul E-Land FC ===
On 5 February 2015, Cho approached a new and definitive homecoming, as he accepted an offer from newly established Seoul E-Land, which was set to debut in K League Challenge.

After finally regaining full form, the South Korean took a considerable part in Seoul E-Land's season, as the team finished in fourth place before losing their playoff match to eventual winners Suwon FC, due to ranking rules. Still, Cho himself and fellow team-mates Kim Jae-sung and Joo Min-kyu were included in the Best XI of that year. Plus, he set new personal records, as he registered both his highest number of appearances (37) and goals (5) in a single season.

=== Third spell with Suwon Bluewings and first retirement ===
Following his restoring experience in the South Korean capital (which is also his birthplace), at the start of 2016 Cho decided to join Suwon Samsung for the third time in his career: he went on playing for the Blue Wings for almost three years, and even though he ended up featuring increasingly less throughout the time, his contributes helped the team win the Korean FA Cup in 2016 and reach the semi-finals of the AFC Champions League in 2018, between other achievements.

On a side note, this last chapter of his permanence at the club is also remembered for what would be considered a curious episode of bad luck: at the 89th minute of the seventeenth match of the 2017 season, while playing against Gangwon FC, Cho attempted to smother Im Chan-ul's attempt to cross into Suwon's penalty box, but his header curved the ball's trajectory unpredictably and eventually turned into a bizarre own-goal, setting the final score of the game into a 3–3 draw. The episode is still well-remembered by football fans all across the country, with Cho himself being repeatedly invited to speak and joke on his error.

On 31 March 2019, Cho announced his retirement from professional football through a special ceremony, hold at Suwon World Cup Stadium shortly before an official league match against Incheon United.

=== A new experience with Suwon FC and definitive retirement ===
After a year and a half of inactivity, Cho unexpectedly came back in action and moved to the Gyeonggi city once more, although the final destination was different this time around: in fact, on 22 July 2020, it was officially announced that Cho would join Suwon FC, the city's second professional team, as a playing coach, thus re-uniting with main manager Kim Do-kyun (the two were team-mates when Cho started his senior career at Ulsan) and assisting him for the rest of the season in K League 2.

During his six-month spell with the Dashers, he played only twice: on 1 August, he started the home match against Ansan Greeners, but he got a yellow card and he was eventually replaced with Lee Ji-hun at the 40th minute, while Suwon FC suffered a 1–2 loss; on 24 October, he came from the bench as a substitute, replacing Lee himself, at the 77th minute of an away match against Jeju United, but could not help his side avoid a 2–0 loss. In both cases, he was used as a right-back, his original position. He also featured on the bench for other five consecutive matches, from 21 September to 10 October. Suwon FC eventually had a successful season, finishing second in the championship and winning the final play-off against Gyeongnam to obtain their second promotion ever to the top-tier rank of the K League.

In these circumstances, although Cho might have not left a very significant mark as an active player, he actually did it off the pitch: in fact, on 4 January 2021, he donated his entire incentive, consisting of 20-million won (roughly corresponding to $18,365), to the club for their sportive achievements in 2020, declaring that the special fee would be invested in their youth development sector. The following day (on 5 January), he addressed his donation in a video for his own YouTube channel, explaining what had brought him to that particular decision: moreover, in the same occasion he announced his definitive retirement from professional football at 37 years old.

Cho Won-hee's retirement closed an 18-year long career, with a total amount of 352 appearances and 10 goals distributed between South Korea, England, China and Japan.

== International career ==
=== Under-20 ===
During the initial phases of his career, Cho represented South Korea's national Under-20 team several times and was selected by manager Park Sung-hwa to take part in the FIFA World Youth Championship (original name of the U-20 World Cup) in 2003, where he played three out of four matches as his side made it through the group stage, being one of the four best third-place finishers, but eventually lost to Japan in the round of 16.

=== Senior team ===
Following his performances with the Sangmu and Suwon, Cho was taken in consideration for the senior national football team since 2005. Dutch manager Jo Bonfrère gave the Blue Wings affiliate his first senior call-up and made him start in an unofficial friendly against North Korea on 14 August 2005, as well as hosting him on the bench three days later, in a 0–1 loss against Saudi Arabia, a match regarding the final round of the Asian qualifications to the 2006 FIFA World Cup.

However, as Bonfrére resigned shortly after the latter match, it was his successor and fellow Dutch Dick Advocaat who gifted Cho with his official international debut, in a friendly match against Iran on 12 October 2005. On the same occasion, Cho also scored his first international goal: a shot attempted after just a few seconds from the start of the game deflected off an opposing defender and fell into the back of the net. This goal has been guessed to be the fastest one ever scored by the South Korean national team, without counting the games played during the 1950s and the 1960s (which have remained unrecorded): plus, it would eventually become the player's only goal for the Taeguk Warriors.

Cho played in the most part of the matches in preparation to the 2006 World Cup and also featured in South Korea's first match of the 2007 AFC Asian Cup qualification (a 1–2 away win against Syria). Despite this and despite being selected by Advocaat in the 23-men squad heading to Germany, he ended up not making a single appearance in the world tournament, with his side being eliminated in the group stage and their manager resigning just a few moments after.

Under another fellow Dutch manager, Pim Verbeek, Cho took part in other matches of qualification to the Asian Cup: however, the following year, due to either technical decisions and him having hard times at Suwon, Cho ended up missing the continental competition.

In 2008, following his return to form, Cho gained the attention of the new head coach Huh Jung-moo and got some new satisfactions at an international level: despite not always being a first choice in Huh's team, he featured in many of the matches regarding the World Cup qualifiers and became one of the protagonists in South Korea's success at the East Asian Football Championship in Chongqing.

Cho kept competing for a starting spot in the national team, with Huh Jung-moo trusting him despite some injury problems (one of which sustained during a friendly match against Iraq) and limited playing time at his new club Wigan: this way, the versatile player could help South Korea qualify for the 2010 FIFA World Cup. However, Cho got eventually left out of the list for the world tournament, in which Huh's side made it through the group stage, but then suffered a 2–1 loss against Uruguay and got eliminated in the round of 16.

Cho played his last match for South Korea on 18 November 2009, an international friendly against Serbia that ended in a 0–1 loss: he closed his international career with 36 senior caps and one goal. He was mainly used in his natural position as a right-back, but Huh Jung-moo sided him as a defensive midfielder in sporadic occasions, following his successful transition to the role at Suwon.

=== International goals ===
Results list South Korea's goal tally first.

Date	Venue	Opponent	Score	Result	Competition
12 October 2005	Seoul World Cup Stadium, Seoul, South Korea	Iran	1–0	2–0	Friendly

== Club career statistics ==
Club performance			League		Cup		League Cup		Continental		Total	
Season	Club	League	Apps	Goals	Apps	Goals	Apps	Goals	Apps	Goals	Apps	Goals
South Korea			League		KFA Cup		League Cup		Asia		Total	
2002	Ulsan Hyundai Horang-i	K League 1	1	0			0	0	—		1	0
2003	Gwangju Sangmu Bulsajo	K League 1	23	2	0	0	—		—		23	2
2004	Gwangju Sangmu Bulsajo	K League 1	10	0	0	0	11	0	—		21	0
2005	Suwon Samsung Bluewings	K League 1	20	0	2	0	9	0			31	0
2006	Suwon Samsung Bluewings	K League 1	23	0	2	0	4	0	—		29	0
2007	Suwon Samsung Bluewings	K League 1	14	0	2	0	5	0	—		21	0
2008	Suwon Samsung Bluewings	K League 1	25	1	1	0	10	0	—		36	1
England			League		FA Cup		League Cup		Europe		Total	
2008–09	Wigan Athletic	Premier League	1	0	0	0	0	0	—		1	0
2009–10	Wigan Athletic	Premier League	4	0	0	0	0	0	—		4	0
South Korea			League		KFA Cup		League Cup		Asia		Total	
2010	Suwon Samsung Bluewings	K League 1	20	1			6	0	—		26	1
China PR			League		FA Cup		CSL Cup		Asia		Total	
2011	Guangzhou Evergrande	Chinese Super League	30	0	2	0	—		—		32	0
2012	Guangzhou Evergrande	Chinese Super League	17	0	2	0	—		7	0	26	0
2013	Wuhan Zall	Chinese Super League	29	0	0	0	—		—		29	0
South Korea			League		KFA Cup		League Cup		Asia		Total	
2014	Gyeongnam FC	K League 1	12	0	0	0	—		—		12	0
2014	Omiya Ardija	J1 League	4	0	0	0	—		—		4	0
2015	Seoul E-Land FC	K League 2	38	5	0	0	—		—		37	5
2016	Suwon Samsung Bluewings	K League 1	26	1	4	0	—		5	0	26	1
2017	Suwon Samsung Bluewings	K League 1	11	0	1	0	—		3	0	11	0
2018	Suwon Samsung Bluewings	K League 1	23	0	1	0	—		6	0		
Retirement
2020	Suwon FC	K League 2	2	0	0	0	—		—		2	0
Total	South Korea		248	10	13	0	45	0	14	0	320	10
Total	England		5	0	0	0	0	0	—		5	0
Total	China PR		76	0	4	0	0	0	7	0	87	0
Career total			329	10	17	0	45	0	21	0	412	10

== Honours ==
Suwon Samsung Bluewings

- K League: 2008
- Korean FA Cup: 2010
- Hauzen Cup: 2008

Guangzhou Evergrande

- Chinese Super League: 2011, 2012
- Chinese FA Cup: 2012
- Chinese FA Super Cup: 2012

South Korea

- EAFF E-1 Football Championship: 2008

=== Individual ===
- 2008 K League 1 Best XI (Suwon Samsung Bluewings)
- 2015 K League 2 Best XI (Seoul E-Land)

== Filmography ==
=== Television shows ===
Year	Title	Role	Notes	Ref.
2021	Golden Eleven 2	Consultant		
2021–Present	Let's Play Soccer 2/Gentlemen's League 2	Cast member	Commentator and defense coach	
2022	Hole-in-One	Cast member		

Sporting positions
Preceded by Kwak Hee-Ju	Suwon Samsung Bluewings captain 2010	Succeeded by Choi Sung-Kuk
Preceded by Mei Fang	Wuhan Zall captain 2013	Succeeded by Wu Yan
