= Lee Hyun-jin =

Lee Hyun-jin may refer to:

- Lee Hyun-jin (actor) (born 1985), South Korean actor
- Lee Hyun-jin (footballer) (born 1984), South Korean male football player
