= Lee Byeong-cheon =

South Korean artist (born 1956)

Lee Byeong-cheon (Korean: 이병천; born 1956) is a South Korean novelist, poet, children's book author, and producer. His works are often based on real events. For example, his short story “Holidei” (홀리데이 Holiday) is a fictional retelling of the “Ji Kang Hun Incident,” a nationally broadcast hostage crisis in 1988 where four prison escapees held a family captive in Seoul. Ji Kang Hun, one of the escapees, became famous for shouting “Not guilty if you’re rich, guilty if you’re poor!” during the standoff with police and trying to commit suicide on camera as he listened to the song “Holiday” by Bee Gees. The short story begins with one of the policemen at the standoff marrying a hostage after the incident. “Baekjodeul noraehamyeo jukda” (백조들 노래하며 죽다 Swans Singing to Their Death) is based on a sex-tape scandal of a South Korean singer and “Urideul saibeo kideu” (우리들 사이버 키드 Us Cyber Kids) is about a man addicted to cyber sex.

== Life ==
Lee Byeong-cheon was born in Wanju County, South Korea on February 11, 1956. He was raised in the city of Jeonju and attended Jeonju High School. He studied Korean literature at Jeonbuk National University and received a master's degree in creative writing at Woosuk University.

Lee was a member of Geulnae Literature Club at Jeonju High School alongside Ha Jae-bong and Kim Ik-du, who would later become a well-known poet and literary critic, respectively. He also ran away from home as a teenager and lived at the Buddhist temple Beomeosa for some time.

Lee made his literary debut in 1981 when his poem “Uriui supe noin myeot gaeui deoche gwanhan hwagin” (우리의 숲에 놓인 몇 개의 덫에 관한 확인 A Confirmation on the Several Traps Laid in Our Forest) won the Chosun Ilbo New Writer's Contest in the poetry category. He was actively involved in literary societies that self-published magazines such as Siundong (“poetry movement”) and Namminsi (“Poetry of Southerners”). In 1982, “Deodeumiui hon” (더듬이의 혼 The Soul of an Antenna) received the Kyunghyang Daily News New Writer's Award, marking the beginning of his career as a fiction writer. He graduated Chonbuk National University in 1984 and joined Jeonju Munhwa Broadcasting Corp. as a producer. He was appointed the head of the news production department in January 2009, but resigned from his post in July that same year.

He has taught creative writing at Jeonju University and Woosuk University, and led the Jeonbuk Writers’ association. In 2007, he organized a literary festival inviting 72 writers from 47 countries across Asia and Africa. He is the current chairman of Honbul Literature and has served as the director of the Jeonbuk Culture and Tourism Foundation since its establishment in 2016.

== Writing ==
Lee Byeong-cheon's first short story collection Sanyang (사냥 The Hunt) came out ten years after his debut. The collection was noted for its compelling rhetorical style, with critics referring to Lee as a “literary stylist” and “homo rhetoricus.” His second short story collection Holidei (홀리데이 Holiday), published a decade later, is a fictional account of real incidents or historical events.

Lee's 2016 novel Bukjjok Nyeoja (북쪽 녀자 Woman from the North) is a story of love and separation between a North Korean woman (Lim Chae-ha) and South Korean man (Baek San-seo). Lim is a tour guide working at Mount Kumgang from the North Korean side, while Baek is a guide from the South Korean side. The two meet on July 3, 2008 and have a passionate romance over the next forty days. They are forced to separate when all tours from the South are suspended due to the death of a South Korean tourist who was shot dead for wandering into a North Korean military area, which is a real-life incident that occurred on July 11, 2008. The lovers long after each other for three years until they decide to seek each other out. But in a cruel twist of fate, Lim defects to South Korea while Baek crosses over to the North. The novel ends with Baek being shot while crossing the Tumen River and Lim mourning over his dead body.

== Works ==
Short Story Collections

1. 『홀리데이』, 문학동네, 2001년, ISBN 9788982814358

Holiday. Munhakdongne, 2001.

2. 『모래내 모래톱』, 문학동네, 1993년, ISBN 9788985712002

The Sandbank of Morae Creek. Munhakdongne, 1993.

Novels

1. 『북쪽 녀자』, 다산책방, 2016년, ISBN 9791130606972

Woman from the North. Dasanchekbang, 2016.

2. 『90000리』, 다산책방, 2011년, ISBN 9788963707365

90,000 Li. Dasanchekbang, 2011.

3. 『에덴 동산을 떠나며』, 문학동네, 2010년, ISBN 9788954611503

Leaving the Garden of Eden. Munhakdongne, 2010.

4. 『저기 저 까마귀떼』, 문학동네, 1995년, ISBN 9788982810206

That Murder of Crows. Munhakdongne, 1995.
