= 2010 Korean FA Cup =

2010 Hana Bank FA Cup

Tournament details
- Country: South Korea
- Teams: 49

Final positions
- Champions: Suwon Samsung Bluewings (3rd title)
- Runners-up: Busan IPark

Tournament statistics
- Matches played: 48
- Top goal scorer(s): Ji Dong-won; Índio (5 goals each)

Awards
- Best player: Yeom Ki-hun

The 2010 Korean FA Cup, known as the 2010 Hana Bank FA Cup, was the 15th edition of the Korean FA Cup. It began on 6 March 2010, and ended on 24 October 2010. The champions Suwon Samsung Bluewings qualified for the 2011 AFC Champions League.

== Schedule ==
Round	Date	Matches	Clubs remaining	Clubs involved	New entries this round
First round	6–7 March 2010	9	49	18	8 K3 League teams 10 university teams
Second round	20–21 March 2010	8	40	9+7	6 Korea National League teams 1 K3 League team
Round of 32	21 April 2010	16	32	8+24	15 K League teams 9 Korea National League teams
Round of 16	21 July 2010	8	16	16	None
Quarter-finals	18 August 2010	4	8	8	None
Semi-finals	29 September 2010	2	4	4	None
Final	24 October 2010	1	2	2	None

== Teams ==
Entry round	Participating teams		
Round of 32	K League All 15 teams of the 2010 season		Korea National League Top 9 teams of the 2009 season
Round of 32	Busan IPark; Jeonnam Dragons; Daegu FC; Daejeon Citizen; FC Seoul; Gangwon FC; Gwangju Sangmu; Gyeongnam FC; Incheon United; Jeju United; Jeonbuk Hyundai Motors; Pohang Steelers; Seongnam Ilhwa Chunma; Suwon Samsung Bluewings; Ulsan Hyundai		Gangneung City; Gimhae City; Changwon City; Suwon City; Incheon Korail; Ansan Hallelujah; Hyundai Mipo Dockyard; Busan Transportation Corporation; Goyang KB Kookmin Bank
Second round	Korea National League Rest 6 teams of the 2010 season		K3 League Champions of the 2009 season
Second round	Cheonan City; Daejeon KHNP; Chungju Hummel; Yesan FC; Mokpo City; Yongin City		Pocheon FC
First round	K3 League Top 8 teams of the 2009 season excluding champions		
First round	Gwangju Gwangsan; Yongin Citizen; Bucheon FC 1995; Icheon Citizen; Cheonan FC; Namyangju Citizen; Cheongju Jikji; Gyeongju Citizen		
First round	U-League Top 2 teams of the 2009 season	National University League (Spring) Top 2 teams of the 2009 season	National University League (Autumn) Top 2 teams of the 2009 season
First round	Dankook University; Jeonju University	Dong-a University; Kwangwoon University	Sungkyunkwan University; Kyung Hee University
First round	National University Championship Top 2 teams of the 2009 season	National University Tournament Champions of the 2009 season	Korean National Sports Festival Champions of the 2009 season
First round	Korea University; Dongguk University	Soongsil University	Hongik University

== Qualifying rounds ==
=== First round ===
The draw for the first round was held on 5 February 2010.

6 March 2010	Hongik University	0–1 (a.e.t.)	Kwangwoon University	Yongin Stadium
11:00 KST			Jeon Sung-chan 104'

6 March 2010	Bucheon FC 1995	4–0	Korea University	Bucheon Stadium
14:00 KST	Shin Kang-sun 11', 22', 52'; Kim Du-kyo 19'

6 March 2010	Dankook University	4–2 (a.e.t.)	Namyangju Citizen	Dankook University Cheonan Campus
14:00 KST	Bae Il-hwan 8'; Yoon Jung-min 38', 103'; Kim Tae-hyung 112'		Yoo Dong-kyu 6'; Hyun Jung-hun 21'

6 March 2010	Yongin Citizen	1–2	Sungkyunkwan University	Yongin Stadium
14:00 KST	Park Young-keun 33'		Kim Deok-il 58'; Kim In-sung 85'

6 March 2010	Gyeongju Citizen	1–2 (a.e.t.)	Dong-a University	Gyeongju Stadium
14:00 KST	Choi Jae-nam 59'		Kim Hyun-soo 32'; Lee Jin-young 100'

6 March 2010	Cheongju Jikji	1–2	Dongguk University	Cheongju Yongjung Football Park
14:00 KST	Sim Jin-hyung 64'		Chu Pyung-gang 26', 88'

6 March 2010	Jeonju University	0–0 (a.e.t.) (5–4 p)	Cheonan FC	Jeonju University
14:00 KST

6 March 2010	Icheon Citizen	1–2	Soongsil University	Icheon City Stadium Practice Field
14:00 KST	Lee Chul-hee 90'		Ko Mu-yeol 73', 90'

6 March 2010	Kyung Hee University	4–2	Gwangju Gwangsan	Yongin Football Center
14:00 KST	Kim Hyuk-jin 30'; Jeong Woo-young 57'; Lee Gwang-sun 70'; Kwon Han-jin 90'		Kim Ji-hwan 20'; Lee Hyung-min 79'

=== Second round ===
The draw for the second round was held on 10 March 2010.

20 March 2010	Yongin City	1–1 (a.e.t.) (7–6 p)	Kwangwoon University	Yongin Football Center
14:00 KST	Kwon O-kyu 110'		Ahn Dong-hyuk 97'
	Penalties
	Do Jae-jun (penalty scored); Shin Young-jun (penalty scored); Chu Jung-hyun (penalty missed); Ji Ho-cheol (penalty scored); Jeong Woo-in (penalty scored); Shin Jun-su (penalty scored); Oh Cheol-seok (penalty scored); Lee Kwang-suk (penalty scored)		(penalty scored) No Dae-ho; (penalty scored) Jeong Seong-min; (penalty missed) Kim Hak-jin; (penalty scored) Jeon Seong-chan; (penalty scored) Kim Chang-hun; (penalty scored) Song Seong-hyun; (penalty scored) Kim Nam-chun; (penalty missed) Ahn Dong-hyuk

20 March 2010	Mokpo City	4–0	Dong-a University	Mokpo International Football Center
14:00 KST	Hong Jong-ho 5'; Seo Seok-won 22'; Lee Jong-min 28'; Choi Woo-ri 75'		Baek Dong-kyu (yellow card) 18' (yellow-red card) 50'

20 March 2010	Yesan FC	1–2 (a.e.t.)	Jeonju University	Yesan Civil Stadium
14:00 KST	Kim Kwan-sik 41'		Kim Jung-hyun 60'; Jin Dae-sung 112'; Jung Hoi-beom (yellow card) 63' (yellow-red card) 115'

20 March 2010	Chungju Hummel	3–1	Soongsil University	Chungju Stadium
14:00 KST	Jeong Hee-jin 30', 42'; Choi Yong-sun 45'		Hong Dong-hyun 57'

20 March 2010	Dankook University	1–2	Daejeon KHNP	Dankook University
14:00 KST	Kim Young-hun 63'		Jeong Woong 51'; Cho Hyun-jae 52'

20 March 2010	Bucheon FC 1995	1–2	Cheonan City	Bucheon Stadium
14:00 KST	Shin Kang-sun 81'; Lee Seol-min (yellow card) 63' (yellow-red card) 89'		Lee Won-sik 86'; Lee Su-hwan 89'

20 March 2010	Kyung Hee University	1–0	Sungkyunkwan University	Yongin Football Center
14:00 KST	Kwon Han-jin 11'

20 March 2010	Pocheon FC	1–3	Dongguk University	Pocheon Stadium
14:00 KST	Park Du-jin 30'		Choi Kwon-su 8'; Hwang Myung-kyu 52', 80'

== Final rounds ==
=== Bracket ===
Round of 32
Busan IPark	3
Incheon Korail	0
FC Seoul (p)	1 (4)
Mokpo City	1 (3)
Ansan Hallelujah	1
Incheon United	2
Daejeon KHNP (a.e.t.)	1
Gangwon FC	0
Changwon City	2
Gyeongnam FC	3
Jeonnam Dragons	6
Gimhae City	2
Gwangju Sangmu	3
Hyundai Mipo Dockyard	0
Pohang Steelers	5
Chungju Hummel	1
Suwon Samsung Bluewings	2
Dongguk University	0
Suwon City (a.e.t.)	1
Daegu FC	0
Jeonbuk Hyundai Motors	5
Jeonju University	0
Cheonan City	1
Gangneung City (a.e.t.)	2
Daejeon Citizen	3
Kyung Hee University	1
Seongnam Ilhwa Chunma	1
Yongin City	0
Busan Transportation Corporation	1
Jeju United	3
Ulsan Hyundai	5
Goyang KB Kookmin Bank	2

Round of 16
Busan IPark	2
FC Seoul	1
Incheon United	2
Daejeon KHNP	0
Gyeongnam FC	4
Jeonnam Dragons	7
Gwangju Sangmu (a.e.t.)	2
Pohang Steelers	1
Suwon Samsung Bluewings	4
Suwon City	1
Jeonbuk Hyundai Motors	2
Gangneung City	1
Daejeon Citizen	0
Seongnam Ilhwa Chunma	3
Jeju United	1
Ulsan Hyundai	0

Quarter-finals
Busan IPark (a.e.t.)	2
Incheon United	1
Jeonnam Dragons	2
Gwangju Sangmu	1
Suwon Samsung Bluewings	2
Jeonbuk Hyundai Motors	0
Seongnam Ilhwa Chunma	0
Jeju United	2

Semi-finals
29 September – Busan
Busan IPark (a.e.t.)	3
Jeonnam Dragons	2
29 September – Suwon
Suwon Samsung Bluewings (p)	0 (4)
Jeju United	0 (2)

Final
24 October – Busan
Busan IPark	0
Suwon Samsung Bluewings	1

=== Round of 32 ===
The draw for the round of 32 was held on 29 March 2010.

21 April 2010	Seongnam Ilhwa Chunma	1–0	Yongin City	Tancheon Sports Complex
19:00 KST	Min Kyung-il 58' (o.g.)		Go Beom-su (red card) 76'; Lee Gyu-cheol (red card) 85'	Attendance: 260

21 April 2010	FC Seoul	1–1 (a.e.t.) (4–3 p)	Mokpo City	Seoul World Cup Stadium
19:00 KST	Hyun Young-min 103' (pen.); Lee Seung-ryul (red card) 108'		Seo Seok-won 104'; Cho Woo-jin (red card) 108'	Attendance: 1,195
	Penalties
	Hyun Young-min (penalty scored); Ha Dae-sung (penalty missed); Kang Jung-hoon (penalty scored); Ou Kyoung-jun (penalty scored); Bang Seung-hwan (penalty scored)		(penalty scored) Bae Dong-hyun; (penalty scored) Hwang Soon-min; (penalty missed) Jang Tae-san; (penalty scored) Seo Seok-won; (penalty missed) Jang Dong-hyuk

21 April 2010	Jeonbuk Hyundai Motors	5–0	Jeonju University	Jeonju World Cup Stadium
19:00 KST	Lim Sang-hyub 10', 54', 71'; Seo Jung-jin 43'; Sim Woo-yeon 55'		Hyun Jung-seok (red card) 51'; No Sung-chan (yellow card) 65' (yellow-red card) 85'	Attendance: 2,132

21 April 2010	Pohang Steelers	5–1	Chungju Hummel	Steelyard Stadium
19:00 KST	Mota 22'; Alexandro 32', 82'; Choi Hyun-youn 40'; Jung Seok-min 59'		Jung Hee-jin 52'	Attendance: 2,800

21 April 2010	Suwon Samsung Bluewings	2–0	Dongguk University	Suwon World Cup Stadium
19:00 KST	Juninho 50', 60'			Attendance: 1,100

21 April 2010	Busan IPark	3–0	Incheon Korail	Busan Asiad Stadium
19:00 KST	Han Sang-woon 11'; Park Hee-do 17', 49'			Attendance: 365

21 April 2010	Ulsan Hyundai	5–2	Goyang KB Kookmin Bank	Ulsan Complex Stadium
19:00 KST	Oh Jang-eun 11'; Ortigoza 28'; Jung Dae-sun 38'; Vélez 49'; Kim Shin-wook 59'; Kim Dong-jin (red card) 63'		Lee Sang-woo 18'; Cha Jong-yun 82'	Attendance: 1,325

21 April 2010	Gwangju Sangmu	3–0	Hyundai Mipo Dockyard	Gwangju World Cup Stadium
19:00 KST	Kim Dong-hyun 24'; Jeon Kwang-hwan 40'; Cho Yong-tae 55'			Attendance: 500

21 April 2010	Jeonnam Dragons	6–2	Gimhae City	Gwang-yang Stadium
19:00 KST	Ji Dong-won 5'; Kim Myung-joong 10'; Índio 21', 87'; Song Jung-hyun 69'; Ko Cha-won 77'		Choo Woon-gi 50'; Lee Jin-hee 76'	Attendance: 600

21 April 2010	Changwon City	2–3	Gyeongnam FC	Changwon Football Center
19:00 KST	Kim Man-hee 40'; Lee Sang-geun (red card) 85'; Kim Dong-young 90'		Kim Dong-chan 23'; Lee Hun 26'; Lúcio 60'	Attendance: 450

21 April 2010	Ansan Hallelujah	1–2	Incheon United	Ansan Wa~ Stadium
19:00 KST	Han Young-goo 83'		Choi Jae-eun 42'; Yoo Byung-soo 77'	Attendance: 300

21 April 2010	Suwon City	1–0 (a.e.t.)	Daegu FC	Suwon Civil Stadium
19:00 KST	Jang Hyeok 95'			Attendance: 430

21 April 2010	Busan Transportation Corporation	1–3	Jeju United	Busan Gudeok Stadium
19:00 KST	Park Joon-hong 61'		Léo Mineiro 17'; Júnior Santos 48', 73'	Attendance: 300

21 April 2010	Daejeon KHNP	1–0 (a.e.t.)	Gangwon FC	Daejeon Hanbat Stadium
19:00 KST	Kim Gi-joong 105'			Attendance: 300

21 April 2010	Daejeon Citizen	3–1	Kyung Hee University	Daejeon World Cup Stadium
19:00 KST	Válber 70', 89'; Ko Chang-hyun 82'		Kim Dong-gi 2'	Attendance: 464

21 April 2010	Cheonan City	1–2 (a.e.t.)	Gangneung City	Cheonan Baekseok Stadium
19:00 KST	Lee Yong-hoon 79'		Kim Jang-hyun 59'; Hong Hyung-gi 101'	Attendance: 312

=== Round of 16 ===
The draw for the round of 16 was held on 28 June 2010.

21 July 2010	Jeonbuk Hyundai Motors	2–1	Gangneung City	Jeonju World Cup Stadium
19:00 KST	Lee Kwang-hyun 30'; Eninho 68'		Sim Jae-won 45+3'	Attendance: 3,247

21 July 2010	Daejeon Citizen	0–3	Seongnam Ilhwa Chunma	Daejeon World Cup Stadium
19:00 KST			Song Ho-young 44'; Molina 65', 89'	Attendance: 1,001

21 July 2010	Jeju United	1–0	Ulsan Hyundai	Jeju World Cup Stadium
19:00 KST	Kim Eun-jung 87'			Attendance: 1,738

21 July 2010	Busan IPark	2–1	FC Seoul	Busan Asiad Stadium
19:00 KST	Han Sang-woon 71'; Lee Jung-ho 84'		Choi Hyo-jin 42'	Attendance: 3,784

21 July 2010	Suwon Samsung Bluewings	4–1	Suwon City	Suwon World Cup Stadium
19:30 KST	Jung Myung-o 1' (o.g.); Lee Sang-ho 33'; Baek Ji-hoon 55', 85'		Oh Ki-jae 52'	Attendance: 7,824

21 July 2010	Gyeongnam FC	4–7	Jeonnam Dragons	Changwon Football Center
19:00 KST	Kim Young-woo 26'; Lucio 43', 68', 90+3'		Lee Wan (yellow card) 38' (red card) 90'; Ji Dong-won 41', 47', 87'; Adriano Chuva 59', 76'; Índio 62', 65'	Attendance: 5,329

21 July 2010	Gwangju Sangmu	2–1 (a.e.t.)	Pohang Steelers	Gwangju World Cup Stadium
19:00 KST	Choi Won-kwon 45+2'; Park Won-hong 108'		Kim Gi-dong 21'	Attendance: 200

21 July 2010	Incheon United	2–0	Daejeon KHNP	Incheon Munhak Stadium
19:30 KST	Yoo Byung-soo 33'; Correa 37'			Attendance: 1,327

=== Quarter-finals ===
The draw for the quarter-finals was held on 29 July 2010.

18 August 2010	Busan IPark	2–1 (a.e.t.)	Incheon United	Busan Asiad Stadium
20:00 KST	Han Sang-woon 10'; Yang Dong-hyun 96'		Yoo Byung-soo 48'	Attendance: 4,248

18 August 2010	Seongnam Ilhwa Chunma	0–2	Jeju United	Tancheon Sports Complex
19:30 KST			Kim Eun-jung 20', 89'	Attendance: 1,214

18 August 2010	Suwon Samsung Bluewings	2–0	Jeonbuk Hyundai Motors	Suwon World Cup Stadium
19:30 KST	Kwak Hee-joo 36'; Yeom Ki-hun 90+2'			Attendance: 12,987

18 August 2010	Jeonnam Dragons	2–1	Gwangju Sangmu	Gwang-yang Stadium
19:00 KST	Choi Won-kwon 13' (o.g.); Ji Dong-won 80'		Choi Sung-kuk 26'	Attendance: 6,534

=== Semi-finals ===
The draw for the semi-finals was held on 13 September 2010.

29 September 2010	Busan IPark	3–2 (a.e.t.)	Jeonnam Dragons	Busan Asiad Stadium
19:00 KST	Yoo Ho-joon 37'; Choo Sung-ho (yellow card) 40' (yellow-red card) 53'; Han Sang-woon 94'; Han Ji-ho 110'		Índio 77'; Adriano Chuva 114'

29 September 2010	Suwon Samsung Bluewings	0–0 (a.e.t.) (4–2 p)	Jeju United	Suwon World Cup Stadium
19:00 KST
	Penalties
	Takahara (penalty scored); José Mota (penalty scored); Márcio Diogo (penalty missed); Yeom Ki-hun (penalty scored); Yang Sang-min (penalty scored)		(penalty missed) Kim Eun-jung; (penalty scored) Gu Ja-cheol; (penalty scored) Lee Sang-hyup; (penalty missed) Neco

=== Final ===
24 October 2010	Busan IPark	0–1	Suwon Samsung Bluewings	Busan Asiad Stadium
16:00 KST			Yeom Ki-hun 26'

== Awards ==
=== Main awards ===
Award	Winner	Team
Most Valuable Player	(South Korea) Yeom Ki-hun	Suwon Samsung Bluewings
Top goalscorer	(South Korea) Ji Dong-won	Jeonnam Dragons
Top goalscorer	(Brazil) Índio	Jeonnam Dragons
Best Manager	(South Korea) Yoon Sung-hyo	Suwon Samsung Bluewings
Fair Play Award	Jeju United	

=== Man of the Round ===
Round	Winner	Team
First round	(South Korea) Shin Kang-sun	Bucheon FC 1995
Second round	(South Korea) Hwang Myung-kyu	Dongguk University
Round of 32	(South Korea) Ji Dong-won	Jeonnam Dragons
Round of 16	(Brazil) Índio	Jeonnam Dragons
Quarter-finals	(South Korea) Kim Eun-jung	Jeju United
Semi-finals	(South Korea) Han Ji-ho	Busan IPark

== See also ==
- 2010 in South Korean football
- 2010 K League
- 2010 Korea National League
- 2010 K3 League
- 2010 U-League
- 2010 Korean League Cup
