= Kim Seon-il (footballer) =

South Korean footballer

Personal information
- Date of birth: June 11, 1985 (age 41)
- Place of birth: Gochang, North Jeolla
- Height: 1.79 m (5 ft 10 1/2 in)
- Position: Midfielder

Youth career
- 2008: Dongguk University

Senior career*
Years	Team	Apps	(Gls)
2009–2010	Suwon Samsung Bluewings		
2011–2012	Radnički Niš	1	(0)
- * Club domestic league appearances and goals

- Kim Seon-il
- Hangul: 김선일
- Hanja: 金善壹
- RR: Gim Seonil
- MR: Kim Sŏnil

Kim Seon-il, sometimes spelled as Kim Sun-il (born 11 June 1985) is a South Korean football defender.

Playing as central defender, or left-back, he came to Serbia in summer 2011 after having played with Suwon Samsung Bluewings in the K-League and winning the 2010 Korean FA Cup with them.

Kim Seon-il played with Dongguk University in 2008 before moving to Bluewings at the end of the year.

He made his league debut with FK Radnički Niš on October 1, 2011, in a Serbian First League round 8 match against FK Donji Srem.

He is a former member of the South Korea national under-20 football team.

== Honours ==
Samsung Bluewings

- Korean FA Cup: 2009, 2010

== External sources ==
- Kim Seon-il at Srbijafudbal
- Kim Seon-il – K League stats at kleague.com (in Korean and English)
