= José Mota (footballer, born 1979) =

Brazilian footballer (born 1979)

Personal information
- Full name: José Roberto Rodrigues Mota Júnior
- Date of birth: 10 May 1979 (age 47)
- Place of birth: São Paulo, Brazil
- Height: 1.86 m (6 ft 1 in)
- Position: Striker

Senior career*
Years	Team	Apps	(Gls)
2001–2002	Rio Ave	6	(1)
2002–2004	Oliveirense	42	(15)
2004	Randers	13	(6)
2005–2006	Viborg	48	(21)
2007–2008	AaB	12	(0)
2008	→ Molde (loan)	25	(12)
2009–2011	Molde	31	(8)
2010	→ Suwon Samsung Bluewings (loan)	19	(7)
2012	Busan IPark	2	(0)
Total		198	(70)
- * Club domestic league appearances and goals

José Roberto Rodrigues Mota Júnior (born 10 May 1979), or simply José Mota, is a Brazilian former professional footballer who played as a striker.

== Career ==
Mota started his senior career at Segunda Liga club Rio Ave where he made six appearances including only one start. He moved to Oliveirense of the same league in the middle of his first season. He scored seven goals in 16 matches for Oliveirense until the end of 2001–02 season, but the club were relegated to the Segunda Divisão B at the end of the season.

On 1 September 2004, Mota joined Danish Superliga club Randers. After showing impressive performances including 13 appearances and six goals for about four months at Randers, he signed a two-and-a-half-year contract with league rivals Viborg on 12 January 2005. He volleyed home a cross from Christian Magleby while making his Viborg debut in a 2–1 win over AGF. For two years at Viborg, he scored 21 goals in 48 Superliga matches.

On 18 January 2007, Mota signed a four-year contract with another Superliga club AaB. He suffered an injury and a slump for a year at AaB, and was loaned to Tippeligaen club Molde on 26 March 2008. At the 2008 Tippeligaen, he scored 12 goals during 25 appearances, becoming the second top goalscorer. Molde supporters were attracted to his performances, collecting donations to help the club secure him on a permanent deal.

In 2010, Mota played for K League club Suwon Samsung Bluewings. During the 2010 AFC Champions League, he scored nine goals in eight matches, becoming the tournament's top goalscorer, although Suwon were eliminated in the quarter-finals. He also won a Korean FA Cup title that year.

In 2011, Mota played five Tippeligaen matches for Molde, while the club won their first league title. The next year, he spent the last season of his playing career at K League club Busan IPark before retiring.

== Honours ==
Molde

- Tippeligaen: 2011

Suwon Samsung Bluewings

- Korean FA Cup: 2010

Individual

- AFC Champions League top goalscorer: 2010
