= Oh Ki-jae =

South Korean footballer (born 1983)

Personal information
- Date of birth: 26 September 1983 (age 43)
- Place of birth: South Korea
- Height: 1.82 m (5 ft 11 1/2 in)
- Position: Midfielder

Team information
- Current team: Goyang Hi FC
- Number: 20

Youth career
- 1999–2001: Boin High School
- 2002–2005: Youngnam University

Senior career*
Years	Team	Apps	(Gls)
2006	FC Seoul	0	(0)
2007–2009	Ansan Hallelujah	62	(6)
2010–2011	Suwon City	41	(4)
2012–2016	Goyang Hi FC	135	(13)
Korean name
Hangul	오기재
Hanja	吳起在
RR	O Gijae
MR	O Kijae
- * Club domestic league appearances and goals as of 1 December 2016

Oh Ki-jae (Korean: 오기재; born 26 September 1983) is a South Korean footballer who plays as midfielder for Goyang Hi FC in K League Challenge.

== Career ==
He was selected by FC Seoul in the 2006 K-League draft but didn't made his debut in the capital team.

He joined Ansan Hallelujah in 2007 and moved to Suwon City in 2010. He made a goal in the Suwon Derby against Suwon Samsung on 21 July 2010.

Oh made his professional debut in the opening match of 2013 K League Challenge on 17 March 2013.
