= Yeom Ki-hun =

South Korean footballer (born 1983)

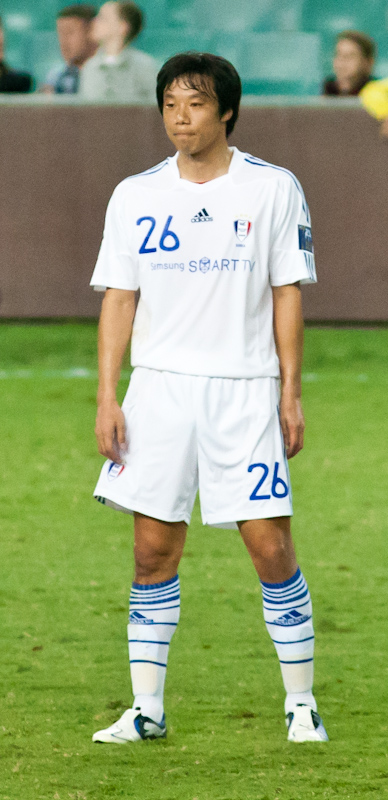
- Yeom with Suwon Samsung Bluewings in 2011

Personal information
- Date of birth: 30 March 1983 (age 43)
- Place of birth: Haenam, Jeonnam, South Korea
- Height: 1.82 m (6 ft 0 in)
- Position: Winger

College career
Years	Team	Apps	(Gls)
2002–2005	Honam University		

Senior career*
Years	Team	Apps	(Gls)
2006–2007	Jeonbuk Hyundai Motors	33	(7)
2007–2009	Ulsan Hyundai	35	(7)
2010–2023	Suwon Samsung Bluewings	331	(48)
2012–2013	→ Korean Police (draft)	21	(7)
Total		420	(69)

International career
2006	South Korea U23	6	(1)
2005	South Korea Universiade		
2006–2018	South Korea	57	(5)

Managerial career
- 2023–2024: Suwon Samsung Bluewings
- 2024: Indonesia (assistant)
Medal record
Representing South Korea
Men's football
AFC Asian Cup
Bronze medal – third place	2007 Indonesia/Malaysia /Thailand/Vietnam
Bronze medal – third place	2011 Qatar
EAFF Championship
Gold medal – first place	2008 China
Gold medal – first place	2017 Japan
Bronze medal – third place	2013 South Korea
- * Club domestic league appearances and goals

- Yeom Ki-hun
- Hangul: 염기훈
- Hanja: 廉基勳
- RR: Yeom Gihun
- MR: Yŏm Kihun

Yeom Ki-hun (Korean: 염기훈; Hanja: 廉基勳; born 30 March 1983) is a South Korean football manager and former player.

== Early life ==
Yeom was a modern pentathlete while attending elementary school, but started playing football at Nonsan Middle School. He played for Nonsan Middle School, Ganggyeong Commercial High School and Honam University.

== Club career ==
=== Jeonbuk Hyundai Motors ===
Yeom joined K League club Jeonbuk Hyundai Motors in 2006 after graduating from university. During his debut season, he contributed to an AFC Champions League title as well as scoring the winning goal in the first leg of the final, and was named the K League Rookie of the Year.

=== Ulsan Hyundai ===
In July 2007, Yeom was transferred to Ulsan Hyundai Horang-i. However, he sustained a stress fracture of one foot every year and could not appear in many matches. Furthermore, he was largely criticised for having tryouts for Premier League club West Bromwich Albion without Ulsan's consent just after recovering from injury in 2008.

=== Suwon Samsung Bluewings ===
==== Early career ====
Yeom moved to Suwon Samsung Bluewings in 2010 in exchange for defender Lee Jae-sung and additional transfer fee. He made his Suwon debut in an AFC Champions League match against Singapore Armed Forces on 27 April 2010, and showed impressive performance as well as scoring two goals in the match. He was blamed in South Korea after his poor performance in the 2010 FIFA World Cup, but led Suwon to the Korean FA Cup title in that year. He became Suwon's captain to replace Choi Sung-kuk, the previous captain and a match fixer, and played as Suwon's core player by providing 20 assists including 14 K League assists in the 2011 season.

==== Enlistment in Korean Police ====
Yeom enlisted in the Korean Police Agency to perform alternative civilian service in 2012, and played for the football club of Korean Police in the 2012 R League. Korean Police participated in the inaugural season of the K League Challenge (renamed K League 2 in 2018) the next year, and Yeom became the top assist provider of the league after having 7 goals and 11 assists during 21 appearances.

==== Return to Suwon ====
Yeom returned to Suwon after finishing his alternative service in the middle of the 2013 season, and was re-elected as the team captain in 2014. Several West Asian clubs including Saudi Pro League side Al-Shabab offered him big contracts in the summer of 2015, but he extended his contract with Suwon.

On 4 October 2015, Yeom had his 69th, 70th and 71st K League assists against Gwangju FC, breaking Shin Tae-yong's record of 68.

Yeom became the top assist provider of the K League Classic (K League 1) for two consecutive seasons in 2015 and 2016. He was a strong candidate for the Most Valuable Player award of the K League Classic by contributing to the most goals in 2015, but lost to winning team's striker Lee Dong-gook.

Instead, Yeom led Suwon to two more Korean FA Cup titles in 2016 and 2019. He won his second Most Valuable Player award in the 2016 tournament, becoming the first-ever player to be named the MVP in two Korean FA Cups.

On 1 March 2018, Yeom assisted Lee Ki-je's goal against Jeonnam Dragons, having his 100th K League assist.

Yeom set several records during the 2021 season. He made his 43rd appearance in the Korean FA Cup and his 391st appearance for Suwon in addition to his 400th appearance in the K League, holding the records for most appearances in the Korean FA Cup and Suwon.

Yeom retired as a player after spending his last season as a player-coach and a caretaker manager in 2023.

== International career ==
Yeom made his senior international debut in a friendly match against Ghana on 8 October 2006,

Yeom played all six matches for South Korea until the third place match in the 2007 AFC Asian Cup.

Yeom was one of main players in the national team under manager Huh Jung-moo. He scored two goals against North Korea and Japan in the 2008 EAFF Championship, becoming one of the top scorers of the competition as well as leading South Korea to the title. He also participated in the 2010 FIFA World Cup, but he didn't live up to fans' expectations during the competition. Especially, he got a crucial chance in front of Argentine goalkeeper Sergio Romero when Argentina held a 2–1 lead in the 57th minute, but he failed to convert the chance into the equaliser. He had been nicknamed the "Oen-bal-ui Masoolsa" (왼발의 마술사, Left-footed Magician) in South Korea before the World Cup, but his nickname "Masoolsa" (Magician) was changed to "Mabsosa" (맙소사; Oh, my god) by disappointed South Korean fans after the 4–1 loss to Argentina. Nevertheless, Germany's sports magazine kicker evaluated him as the second best South Korean player in the World Cup.

The national team managers also did not use Yeom as a main player after fans lost faith in him. He could participated in only FIFA World Cup qualification and EAFF Championship after playing as a substitute in the 2011 AFC Asian Cup. However, manager Shin Tae-yong frequently called him up before the 2018 FIFA World Cup, and so he was expected to return to the World Cup. He also scored with a free kick against Japan in the 2017 EAFF Championship. However, he suffered a rib fracture when playing for his club on 9 May 2018, one month before the competition.

== Managerial career ==
After the 2022 season, Yeom agreed to a one-year contract extension with Suwon Samsung Bluewings as a player-coach, postponing his retirement as a player for one year. However, he was appointed caretaker manager on 25 September 2023 when Suwon was in danger of relegation. Suwon was relegated to the K League 2 after the season, but he was promoted to the permanent manager. He was named the K League Manager of the Month for April 2024 by earning four consecutive wins in the K League 2, but resigned from his post after suffering five consecutive defeats the next month.

In August 2024, Yeom was recruited by Shin Tae-yong to be his assistant for the Indonesia national team.

== Personal life ==
Yeom often lost his health from early years. He had surgery on his right big toe when he was six years old, and became a left-footed player. He suffered from Anemia and Meningitis during his schooldays. He was wounded in the head by a car accident in July 2006, and sustained a stress fracture every year from 2007 to 2010.

== Career statistics ==
=== Club ===
Appearances and goals by club, season and competition
Club	Season	League			National cup		League cup		Continental		Total	
Club	Season	Division	Apps	Goals	Apps	Goals	Apps	Goals	Apps	Goals	Apps	Goals
Jeonbuk Hyundai Motors	2006	K League	20	3	2	0	11	4	10	3	43	10
Jeonbuk Hyundai Motors	2007	K League	13	4	0	0	5	1	0	0	18	5
Jeonbuk Hyundai Motors	Total		33	7	2	0	16	5	10	3	61	15
Ulsan Hyundai	2007	K League	3	1	0	0	0	0	—		3	1
Ulsan Hyundai	2008	K League	16	4	1	0	3	1	—		20	5
Ulsan Hyundai	2009	K League	16	2	0	0	4	1	1	0	21	3
Ulsan Hyundai	Total		35	7	1	0	7	2	1	0	44	9
Suwon Samsung Bluewings	2010	K League	17	0	4	2	2	1	4	4	27	7
Suwon Samsung Bluewings	2011	K League	29	9	5	0	0	0	11	4	45	13
Suwon Samsung Bluewings	2013	K League 1	9	1	—		—		—		9	1
Suwon Samsung Bluewings	2014	K League 1	35	4	1	0	—		—		36	4
Suwon Samsung Bluewings	2015	K League 1	35	8	1	0	—		7	2	43	10
Suwon Samsung Bluewings	2016	K League 1	34	4	6	1	—		5	0	45	5
Suwon Samsung Bluewings	2017	K League 1	38	6	4	2	—		6	2	48	10
Suwon Samsung Bluewings	2018	K League 1	34	6	3	0	—		11	0	48	6
Suwon Samsung Bluewings	2019	K League 1	26	6	7	5	—		—		33	11
Suwon Samsung Bluewings	2020	K League 1	25	3	2	0	—		2	0	29	3
Suwon Samsung Bluewings	2021	K League 1	27	1	3	0	—		—		30	1
Suwon Samsung Bluewings	2022	K League 1	19	0	2	0	—		—		21	0
Suwon Samsung Bluewings	2023	K League 1	3	0	1	0	—		—		4	0
Suwon Samsung Bluewings	Total		331	48	39	10	2	1	46	12	418	71
Korean Police (draft)	2012	—	—		3	0	—		—		3	0
Korean Police (draft)	2013	K League 2	21	7	1	0	—		—		22	7
Korean Police (draft)	Total		21	7	4	0	—		—		25	7
Career total			420	69	46	10	25	8	57	15	548	102

=== International ===
Scores and results list South Korea's goal tally first.

List of international goals scored by Yeom Ki-hun
No.	Date	Venue	Opponent	Score	Result	Competition
1	29 June 2007	Jeju World Cup Stadium, Seogwipo, South Korea	Iraq	1–0	3–0	Friendly
2	20 February 2008	Chongqing Olympic Sports Center, Chongqing, China	North Korea	1–0	1–1	2008 EAFF Championship
3	23 February 2008	Chongqing Olympic Sports Center, Chongqing, China	Japan	1–0	1–1	2008 EAFF Championship
4	11 June 2015	Kuala Lumpur Stadium, Kuala Lumpur, Malaysia	United Arab Emirates	1–0	3–0	Friendly
5	16 December 2017	Ajinomoto Stadium, Tokyo, Japan	Japan	4–1	4–1	2017 EAFF Championship

== Honours ==
=== Player ===
Jeonbuk Hyundai Motors

- AFC Champions League: 2006

Suwon Samsung Bluewings

- Korean FA Cup: 2010, 2016, 2019

South Korea

- AFC Asian Cup third place: 2007, 2011
- EAFF Championship: 2008, 2017

Individual

- K League Rookie of the Year: 2006
- K League All-Star: 2007, 2013, 2014, 2015, 2017
- EAFF Championship top goalscorer: 2008
- Korean FA Cup Most Valuable Player: 2010, 2016
- K League 1 Best XI: 2011, 2015, 2017
- K League 2 Best XI: 2013
- K League 2 top assist provider: 2013
- K League All-Star Game Most Valuable Player: 2015
- K League 1 top assist provider: 2015, 2016
- Korean FA Cup top goalscorer: 2019

Records

- K League all-time top assist provider: 110 assists
- Korean FA Cup all-time appearance leader: 46 appearances

=== Manager ===
Individual

- K League Manager of the Month: April 2024

Sporting positions
Preceded by Choi Sung-Kuk	Suwon Samsung Bluewings captain 2011	Succeeded by Kwak Hee-Ju
