= Halla University =

University in Wonju, South Korea

Coordinates: 37.3028°N 127.9081°E

- Type: Private
- Established: March 6, 1995
- Location: Wonju, Gangwon, South Korea
- Website: www.halla.ac.kr
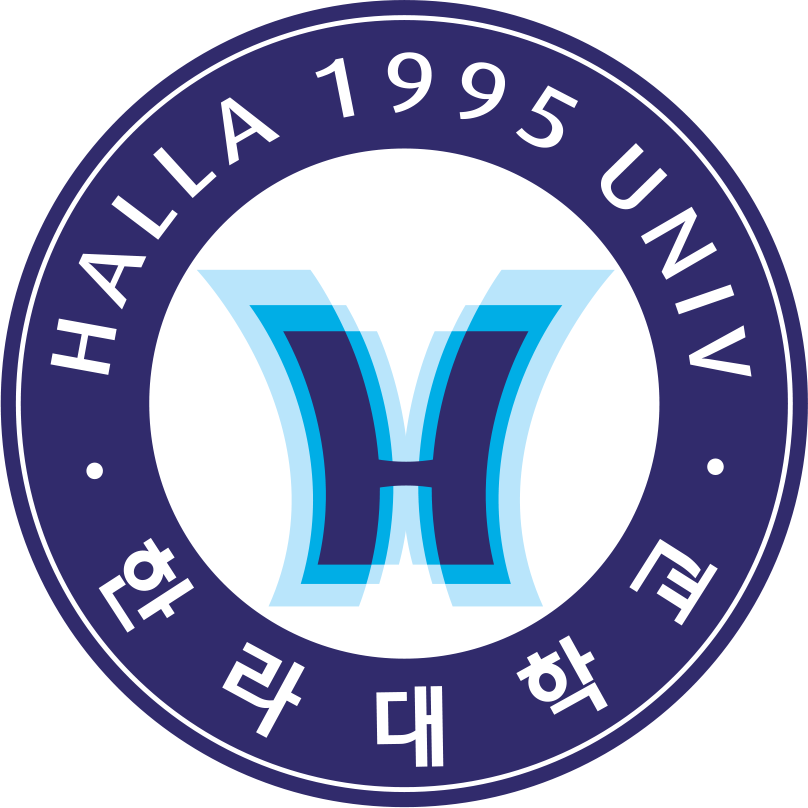

- Halla University
- Hangul: 한라대학교
- Hanja: 漢拏大學校
- RR: Halla daehakgyo
- MR: Halla taehakkyo

Halla University (Korean: 한라대학교) is a private university located in Wonju, Gangwon Province, South Korea. The University was established in 1995.
