= Bae Dae-won =

South Korean footballer

Bae Dae-Won
Personal information
- Full name: Bae Dae-Won
- Date of birth: July 6, 1988 (age 38)
- Place of birth: South Korea
- Height: 1.84 m (6 ft 0 in)
- Position: Defender

Team information
- Current team: Gimhae

Youth career
- 2007–2009: Hanyang University

Senior career*
Years	Team	Apps	(Gls)
2010	Suwon Samsung Bluewings	0	(0)
2010–2011	Gimhae City		
2012	Busan Transportation Corporation		
2012–2013	Tokyo Verdy	5	(1)
2013–2015	FC Machida Zelvia	38	(0)
2016–2017	Gimpo Citizen	?	(?)
2018–	Gimhae	?	(?)
- * Club domestic league appearances and goals

Bae Dae-Won (born July 6, 1988) is a South Korean football player who currently plays for Gimhae FC.

== Club statistics ==
Club performance			League		Cup		Total	
Season	Club	League	Apps	Goals	Apps	Goals	Apps	Goals
Japan			League		Emperor's Cup		Total	
2012	Tokyo Verdy	J2 League	2	0				
Country	Japan		2	0	0	0	2	0
Total			2	0	0	0	2	0
