= Lee Dong-sik =

South Korean footballer (born 1979)

Lee Dong-Sik 이동식
Personal information
- Full name: Lee Dong-Sik
- Date of birth: 15 March 1979 (age 47)
- Place of birth: South Korea
- Height: 1.83 m (6 ft 0 in)
- Position: Defender

Youth career
- Hongik University

Senior career*
Years	Team	Apps	(Gls)
2002–2003	Pohang Steelers	0	(0)
2004–2009	Bucheon SK / Jeju United	68	(4)
2006–2007	→ Gwangju Sangmu (military service)	35	(1)
2010	Suwon Bluewings	4	(0)
2011	Busan IPark	0	(0)

International career
2008	Korea Republic	0	(0)
- * Club domestic league appearances and goals as of 12:56, 28 May 2009 (UTC)

- Lee Dong-sik
- Hangul: 이동식
- Hanja: 李東植
- RR: I Dongsik
- MR: I Tongsik

Lee Dong-Sik (born 15 March 1979) is a South Korean footballer who plays for Busan I'Park in the K-League.

Lee previously played for Pohang Steelers, Bucheon SK, Gwangju Sangmu Bulsajo(army) and Suwon Bluewings.

== Club career statistics ==
Club performance			League		Cup		League Cup		Continental		Total	
Season	Club	League	Apps	Goals	Apps	Goals	Apps	Goals	Apps	Goals	Apps	Goals
South Korea			League		KFA Cup		League Cup		Asia		Total	
2002	Pohang Steelers	K-League	0	0	?	?	0	0	-			
2003	Pohang Steelers	K-League	0	0	0	0	-		-		0	0
2004	Bucheon SK	K-League	13	1	5	0	5	0	-		23	1
2005	Bucheon SK	K-League	18	3	0	0	8	0	-		26	3
2006	Gwangju Sangmu Bulsajo	K-League	23	0	2	0	5	0	-		30	0
2007	Gwangju Sangmu Bulsajo	K-League	12	1	1	0	6	1	-		19	2
2008	Jeju United	K-League	21	0	1	0	6	0	-		28	0
2009	Jeju United	K-League							-			
Total	South Korea		87	5			30	1	-			
Career total			87	5			30	1				
