= Jang Dong-hyuk (footballer) =

South Korean footballer

Personal information
- Full name: Jang Dong-hyuk (장동혁)
- Date of birth: May 20, 1983 (age 43)
- Place of birth: South Korea
- Height: 1.74 m (5 ft 9 in)
- Position: Midfielder

Senior career*
Years	Team	Apps	(Gls)
2006–2008	Chunnam Dragons	21	(0)
2010–2011	Mokpo City FC	47	(0)
- * Club domestic league appearances and goals

Jang Dong-hyuk (born May 20, 1983) is a South Korean footballer.

He has previously played for Chunnam Dragons and Mokpo City FC in the N-League.
