= Lee Ji-hun =

South Korean footballer

Personal information
- Date of birth: 24 March 1994 (age 32)
- Place of birth: South Korea
- Height: 1.76 m (5 ft 9 in)
- Position: Defender

Team information
- Current team: Seongnam FC
- Number: 94

Senior career*
Years	Team	Apps	(Gls)
2017–2019	Ulsan Hyundai FC	5	(0)
2019	Incheon United FC	7	(0)
2020	Suwon FC	21	(0)
2021	Gwangju FC	33	(0)
2022–	Seongnam FC	40	(0)
2024–2025	→ Seoul Jungnang FC (loan)		
- * Club domestic league appearances and goals as of 6 August 2026

- Lee Ji-hun
- Hangul: 이지훈
- RR: I Jihun
- MR: I Chihun

Lee Ji-hun (Korean: 이지훈; born 24 March 1994) is a South Korean football defender who plays for Seongnam FC in the second tier of professional football in South Korea, the K League 2. He has previously played for Suwon FC, Incheon United FC, and Ulsan Hyundai FC.

== Club career ==
Born on 24 March 1994, Lee made his debut for Ulsan Hyundai FC on 19 November 2017, playing against Gangwon FC in the K League 1. He moved to Incheon United FC in July 2019 on loan. He transferred to Suwon FC for the 2020 season of the K League 2, playing 21 league games that year. For the 2021 season, he moved to Gwangju FC, playing in the K League 1

== Club career statistics ==
As of 25 January 2023

Club performance			League		Cup		Continental		Total	
Season	Club	League	Apps	Goals	Apps	Goals	Apps	Goals	Apps	Goals
South Korea			League		KFA Cup		Asia		Total	
2017	Ulsan Hyundai FC	K League 1	3	0	0	0	1	0	4	0
2018	Ulsan Hyundai FC	K League 1	1	0	0	0	0	0	1	0
2019	Ulsan Hyundai FC	K League 1	0	0	0	0	0	0	0	0
2019	Incheon United FC	K League 1	7	0	0	0	-		7	0
2020	Suwon FC	K League 2	21	0	1	0	-		22	0
2021	Gwangju FC	K League 1	33	0	0	0	-		33	0
2022	Seongnam FC	K League 1	16	0	1	0	-		17	0
Career total			81	0	2	0	1	0	84	0

== Honors and awards ==
=== Player ===
Ulsan Hyundai FC

- Korean FA Cup Winners (1) : 2017
