= Hoseo University =

Private Christian university in South Korea

Coordinates: 36°49′39″N 127°11′00″E

- 호서대학교
- Motto: 할 수 있다. 하면 된다. (빌립보서 4:13) (We can. - Do it, and it will come true.(Philippians 4:13))
- Type: Private
- Established: 28 December 1978
- President: Dae Hyun Kim (김대현)
- Faculty: 855 (2021)
- Undergraduates: 15,161 (2021)
- Postgraduates: 1,308 (2021)
- Location: Asan, South Chungcheong Province, South Korea
- Campus: Suburb
- Mascot: Eagle
- Website: www.hoseo.ac.kr

Korean name
- Hangul: 호서대학교
- Hanja: 湖西大學校
- RR: Hoseo daehakgyo
- MR: Hosŏ taehakkyo

Hoseo University is a private Christian university with four campuses; Main Campus in Asan, South Korea, other campuses in Cheonan, South Korea, known for its large size, 3.471074 km, Dangjin, South Korea and Seoul, South Korea (Venture Graduate School). It was the first school to establish a graduate school for venture business in South Korea. The university's "World Class 2030" project promotes research in the area of unexplored fields such as the interface of five senses, the expression of the sense of smell, or defense mechanism of invertebrate animals within 20 years.^{[3]}

The university was originally a private technical college when it was founded in 1978 in Anseo-dong, Cheonan-si, South Chungcheong Province, called Cheonwon Technology University. ^{[2]} The founder is Seokgyu Kang, and the motto of the school is "We can do it, and it will come true." In 1980, Cheonwon Technology University changed its name to Hoseo University and, in eight years, it was re-formed as a four-year collegiate university. ^{[2]}The second Hoseo University campus was founded in 1989 in 165, Sechul-ri, Baebang-myun Asan-si, Chungcheongnam-do. ^{[2]} The administration facilities of the university were moved to the second Campus in Asan, making the Asan campus the main campus of Hoseo University, and Cheonan campus automatically became the first campus in 1991. ^{[2]}

The university has a central library, museum, broadcasting company, newspaper, continuing education and health clinic center, etc. It also has several research centers: industrial-educational cooperation research center, small and medium-sized businesses research center, industrial technology research center, display technical education research center and environmental bio research center.

With the aim of specializing in ventures, it established South Korea's first techno valley in the campus area, established Hoseo Venture Investment Co., Ltd., a venture investment company, and Hoseo Consulting Co., Ltd., a venture consulting company. In addition, Hoseo University's Graduate School of Venture Studies (GSV), the first Graduate School of Venture Studies in South Korea, was established and operated in Seocho-gu, Seoul.

As of 2014, it ranked first (61.6%) in the employment rate in North Chungcheong Province and has stood out in the design field, including winning the world's top three design competitions for the seventh consecutive year. (As of 2021, the Industrial Design Department has won three Red Dot Awards.)

In 2014, the Department of Nursing was evaluated as the top department in the evaluation of the science and engineering department of the JoongAng Ilbo.

The Department of Architecture was recognized for its excellence by obtaining certification approval from the Korea Architectural Accrediting Board(KAAB) three times.

Additionally, various departments, including the Department of Applied Statistics and the Department of Chemical Engineering, are receiving excellent reviews, and they operate various graduate schools and research institutes along with 8 colleges, 59 undergraduate departments.

== Slogan ==
"We can. - Do it, and it will come true."

This motto means the University's willingness to respect God and cultivate talented students who love themselves based on the Christian spirit of 'I can do all this through him who gives me strength.' of Philippians 4:13.

"Those without a dream, dare not come to this place. Those without the desire to make it to the end, dare not come to this place, either. Only those who believe in the fact that if I try, I can make it may come to this place"

It is a phrase engraved on the school building, and just as the motto, it appeals to visitors the university's will based on Philippians 4:13.

== History ==
Hoseo University was founded in December 1978 as Cheonwon Technical College (천원공업전문대학). In December 1980 the 2-year college was developed into Hoseo University, a 4-year university. It was granted full university status in October 1988.

At first, it had only one campus in Cheonan. In February 1989 the second campus was opened in Asan. Since August 1991 Asan Campus has been the main campus.

The first president of Hoseo University was Seok Kyu Kang from 1979 to 2000, then Geun Mo Jung was sworn in as the next president of the university in March 2000. Since March 2004, Il Ku Kang, the son of the first president, has been the president of Hoseo University.

== Scholarship programs ==
"Venture Frontier Excellence Education" is a program at Hoseo University that provides selected students with a full scholarship for four years, placements in companies, internship, opportunities for studying abroad, etc. The qualifications to be selected as a member of the program includes Christian values, venture leadership, creative thinking, global communication and global teamwork. During the school year, Hoseo University offer the students a creative subject-centered curriculum, tutoring in language specifically Japanese, English (EMC - English Multilanguage Cafe) and Chinese, and in mathematics, global communication education help (Hoseo English Language Program), and venture convergence lab meetings (Can Do Spirit, Project Design). ^{[7]} During breaks, the university offers English immersion education with opportunities to experience American culture for four weeks in the United States, and design education with four weeks of an internship in Italy.^{[7]}

== Colleges (undergraduate schools) ==
- College of Humanities & Social Sciences (including the Division of Christian Studies)
- Business School
- College of Life and Health Sciences
- College of Engineering (including the Department of Architectural Design)
- College of AI Convergence
- College of Art & Sports Sciences
- College of Future Convergence

Year	Capacity of enrollment reached(%)	Rate of employment after undergraduate education(%)	Tuition fee/year (Won)	Number of undergraduate students	Demand factor for dormitory of all undergraduate students(%)	Faculty ratio(number of students per teacher)
2011	100	54.3	8,178,400	18,645	17.1	35.1
2010	99.8	51.1	8,157,000	18,624	14.9	35.0
2009	99.8	73.8	8,158,000	18,343	15.5	34.9

== Graduate schools ==
- General Graduate School
- Graduate School of Theology
- School of Venture Business
- School of Business Administration
- School of Public Administration
- School of Education
- School of Culture and Welfare
- School of Global Business
- School of Sport and Science

== Notable students ==
- Kim Min-seok
- Crush
- Won Jin-ah
- L
- Yumdda
