= Kwak Hee-ju =

South Korean footballer (born 1981)

Kwak Hee-Ju 곽희주
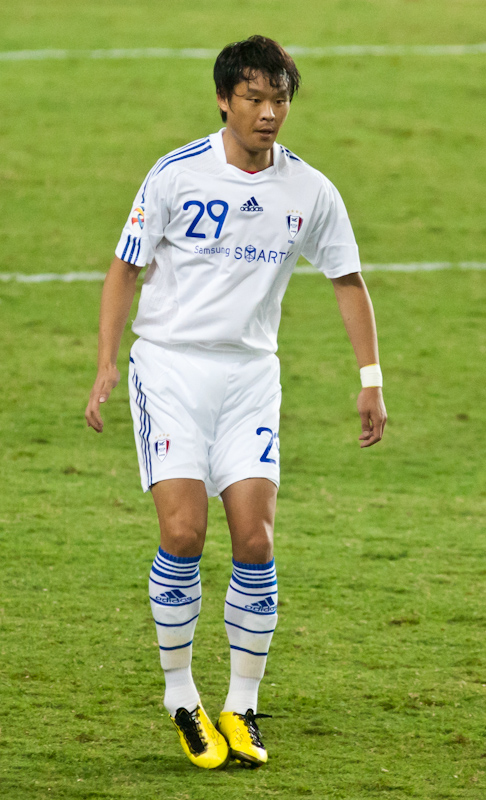

Personal information
- Date of birth: 5 October 1981 (age 45)
- Place of birth: Gangneung, Gangwon, South Korea
- Height: 1.84 m (6 ft 0 in)
- Position: Defender

Youth career
- 1999–2002: Kwangwoon University

Senior career*
Years	Team	Apps	(Gls)
2003–2013	Suwon Samsung Bluewings	285	(17)
2014	FC Tokyo	0	(0)
2014–2015	Al-Wakrah	5	(0)
2015–2016	Suwon Samsung Bluewings	23	(2)

International career
2005–2008	South Korea	6	(0)
- * Club domestic league appearances and goals

- Kwak Hee-ju
- Hangul: 곽희주
- Hanja: 郭熙柱
- RR: Gwak Huiju
- MR: Kwak Hŭiju

Kwak Hee-Ju (born 5 October 1981) is a South Korean footballer who plays as a defender who last played for Suwon Samsung Bluewings.

At first, he did not enjoy much success with the team, but since early of 2004, he has become one of the key players of defence of Suwon Samsung Bluewings.

He was member of South Korea that parted East Asian Cup 2008 and World Cup qualifier of 2006 and 2010.

== Club statistics ==
As of 19 September 2014

Club performance			League		Cup		League Cup		Continental		Total	
Season	Club	League	Apps	Goals	Apps	Goals	Apps	Goals	Apps	Goals	Apps	Goals
South Korea			League		KFA Cup		League Cup		Asia		Total	
2003	Suwon Bluewings	K-League	11	0	0	0	-		-		11	0
2004	Suwon Bluewings	K-League	25	0	0	0	12	0	-		37	0
2005	Suwon Bluewings	K-League	20	4	2	0	10	0	6	0	38	4
2006	Suwon Bluewings	K-League	13	1	4	0	7	0	-		24	1
2007	Suwon Bluewings	K-League	19	0	2	0	7	1	-		28	1
2008	Suwon Bluewings	K-League	25	1	1	0	10	2	-		36	3
2009	Suwon Bluewings	K-League	21	0	5	0	1	0	6	0	33	0
2010	Suwon Bluewings	K-League	22	2	4	1	4	1	9	1	39	0
2011	Suwon Bluewings	K-League	19	3	4	0	0	0	6	0	29	3
2012	Suwon Bluewings	K-League	33	1	2	0	-		-		36	1
2013	Suwon Bluewings	K League Classic	26	1	1	0	-		4	0	18	1
Total	South Korea		234	13	25	1	51	4	31	1	341	19
Japan			League		Emperor's Cup		J.League Cup		Asia		Total	
2014	FC Tokyo	J1 League	0	0	0	0	2	0	-		2	0
Total	Japan		0	0	0	0	2	0	-		2	0
Qatar			League		Emir Cup		-		Asia		Total	
2014–2015	Al Wakrah	Stars League	0	0	0	0	-		-		0	0
Total	Qatar		0	0	0	0	-		-		0	0
Career total			234	13	25	1	53	4	31	1	343	19

== Honours ==
=== Club ===
Suwon Samsung Bluewings

- K-League (2): 2004, 2008
- K-League runner-up: 2006
- Korean FA Cup (2): 2009, 2010
- Korean FA Cup runner-up (2): 2006, 2011
- K-League Cup (2): 2005, 2008
- Korean Super Cup: 2005
- A3 Champions Cup: 2005
- Pan-Pacific Championship: 2009

=== National team ===
South Korea

- EAFF East Asian Cup: 2008

=== Individual ===
- 2004 K-League Yearly Best 11 (Defender)
- 2008 Windsor Awards Korean Football Best 11 (Defender)

Sporting positions
Preceded by Song Chong-gug	Suwon Samsung Bluewings captain 2009	Succeeded by Cho Won-hee
Preceded by Yeom Ki-hun	Suwon Samsung Bluewings captain 2012	Succeeded by Kim Do-heon
