= Choi Gee-sung =

South Korean businessman (born 1951)

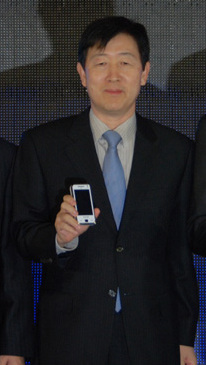
- Born: 2 February 1951 (age 75)
- Education: Seoul National University
- Occupations: President and Chief Executive of the digital media division at Samsung Electronics

Korean name
- Hangul: 최지성
- Hanja: 崔志成
- RR: Choe Jiseong
- MR: Ch'oe Chisŏng

Choi Gee-sung (Korean: 최지성; born 2 February 1951) is President and Chief Executive of the digital media division at Samsung Electronics, overseeing the third-largest business group of the South Korean company, which includes televisions, flat-panel screens, MP3 players, personal computers, and other consumer electronics. He was a New York City torchbearer for the 2004 Summer Olympics relay.

== Early life ==
Choi grew up in Chuncheon, Gangwon Province, where he attended Chuncheon Middle School and Chuncheon High School. He graduated from Seoul National University's Department of Business in 1977.

== Career ==
Choi had a stint as chief design officer and established Samsung's chip business in Europe in the 1980s. He is best known as a marketing expert, however, and is credited with having steered Samsung past Sony (SNE) to become the world's No. 1 TV brand in 2006. Choi took over the running of Samsung's mobile phone business in January 2007. By September 2008, the company's global market share stood at 17.1%—second only to Nokia and up from 14.4% in 2007.
