= Márcio Diogo =

Brazilian footballer

Personal information
- Full name: Márcio Diogo Lobato Rodrigues
- Date of birth: September 22, 1985 (age 41)
- Place of birth: Pinheiro, Maranhão, Brazil
- Height: 1.70 m (5 ft 7 in)
- Position: Attacking midfielder

Team information
- Current team: Moto Club

Senior career*
Years	Team	Apps	(Gls)
2005–2010	Cruzeiro	1	(0)
2006	→ Ipatinga (loan)	1	(0)
2006	→ Democrata-SL (loan)	0	(0)
2008–2009	→ Villa Nova (loan)	0	(0)
2009	→ Ipatinga (loan)	22	(4)
2010	→ Paraná (loan)	6	(2)
2010	→ Suwon Bluewings (loan)	0	(0)
2011–2012	Ponte Preta	43	(4)
2012	Ipatinga	38	(6)
2013	XV de Piracicaba	12	(5)
2013	Avaí	35	(9)
2014	São Bernardo	12	(2)
2014	Sampaio Corrêa	19	(3)
2015	Fortaleza	9	(1)
2015	Boa Esporte	7	(0)
2016	Grêmio Osasco Audax	9	(0)
2017	Democrata-GV	5	(1)
2017	Brasiliense	0	(0)
2017	URT	4	(0)
2018	River	9	(3)
2018	Moto Club	33	(12)
2019	Guarany de Sobral	8	(5)
2020	Pinheiro	6	(1)
2020	Juventude Samas	13	(6)
2021	Pinheiro	10	(1)
2021–	Moto Club	5	(2)
- * Club domestic league appearances and goals

Márcio Diogo Lobato Rodrigues (born September 22, 1985), is a Brazilian footballer who plays as an attacking midfielder for Moto Club.

== Honours ==
Cruzeiro

- Campeonato Mineiro: 2005, 2006

Ceará

- Campeonato Cearense: 2015
