= Woosuk University =

Private University in South Korea

Coordinates: 35°54′45.5″N 127°4′0.1″E

- Type: Private
- Established: 1979
- President: Ra Jong-yil
- Undergraduates: 7,784
- Postgraduates: 610
- Location: Wanju County, South Korea
- Campus: Urban
- Website: english.woosuk.ac.kr

Korean name
- Hangul: 우석대학교
- Hanja: 又石大學校
- RR: Useok daehakgyo
- MR: Usŏk taehakkyo

Woosuk University (WU; Korean: 우석대학교) is a private university located in Wanju County, North Jeolla Province and Jincheon County, North Chungcheong Province, Republic of Korea.

== History ==
The origins of Woosuk University began with the establishment of Woosuk Academy. Founder Wooseok Dr. Seo Sang-sang took over Hanjin Academy, which operated Dongsan Middle School at the time, and renamed it Wooseok Academy named after his pseudonym 'Wooseok', and established and operated Dongsan Comprehensive High School together with Dongsan Middle School did On January 10, 1979, Woosuk University was established under the name of Jeonju Woosuk Women's University with approval from the Ministry of Education at the time.

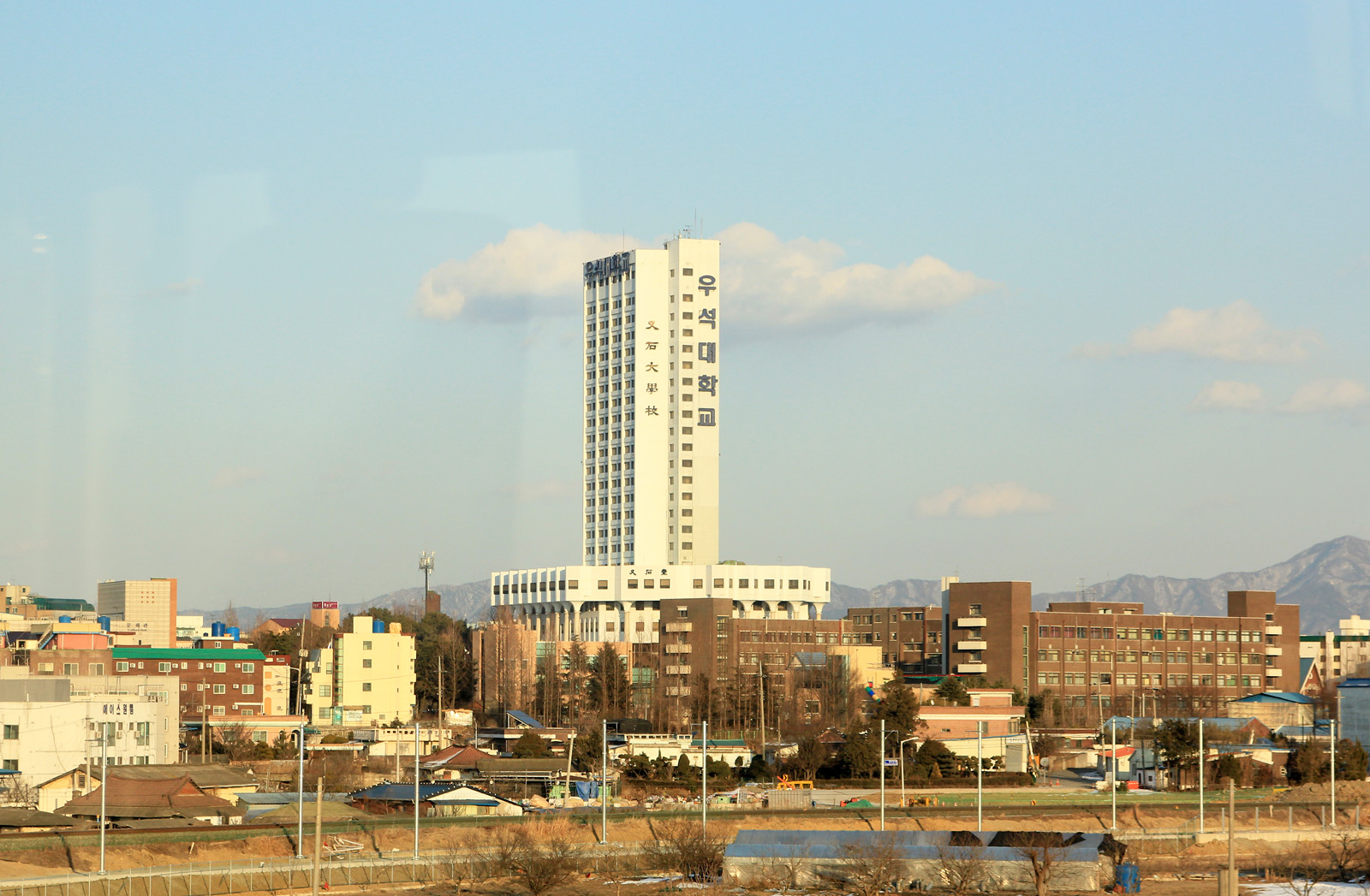
Woosuk University 우석대학교

When it was established in 1979, it started as a women's college, but on October 2, 1980, it changed its name to Jeonju Woosuk University, and in 1981, it switched to a coeducational system from freshmen. In 1982, it moved to the current comprehensive campus (Samrye-eup, Wanju County), and in a short period of time, including the establishment of a graduate school in 1983, it began to take shape as a prestigious local private school. On March 15, 1992, the Ministry of Education recognized the elevation to a comprehensive university.

In addition to the currently operating Jeonju Campus, Woosuk University established and opened the Jincheon Campus consisting of 2 colleges and 14 departments in Jincheon, North Chungcheong Province in March 2014.

== Academics & Education ==
=== Domestic Ranking ===
According to EduRank, Woosuk University holds the 79th position among 193 universities in South Korea.

=== World Ranking ===
According to EduRank, on a global scale, Woosuk University is positioned at 4007th among 14,131 evaluated institutions. While its international ranking is moderate, it maintains a respectable presence in Asia, holding the 1355th spot out of 5,830 universities. The university's research contributions are noteworthy, with 1,951 academic publications and 27,947 citations associated with its name. This research productivity is reflected in its ranking across various subject areas. Additionally, Woosuk University ranks 3615th for Alumni Impact and falls within the top 50% in eight other subject categories.

== Notable alumni ==
- Chae Young-in, actress
- Key, singer (SHINee)
- Catherine Seulki Kang, South Korean-born naturalized Central African taekwondo practitioner, 2012 Olympics
