= Yeo Seung-won =

South Korean footballer (born 1984)

Personal information
- Date of birth: May 1, 1984 (age 42)
- Place of birth: South Korea
- Height: 1.82 m (6 ft 0 in)
- Position: Forward

Senior career*
Years	Team	Apps	(Gls)
2004–2008	Incheon United	16	(1)
2006–2007	→ Gwangju Sangmu Bulsajo (army)	33	(1)
2009	Busan Transportation Corporation	18	(7)
2010	Suwon Samsung Bluewings	5	(0)
2011	Daejeon KHNP	19	(3)
- * Club domestic league appearances and goals

Yeo Seung-won (Korean: 여승원; born May 1, 1984) is a retired South Korean footballer. He played for Incheon United, Gwangju Sangmu, Busan Transportation Corporation, Suwon Samsung Bluewings and Daejeon KHNP.
