= Lee Hyun-jin (footballer) =

South Korean footballer

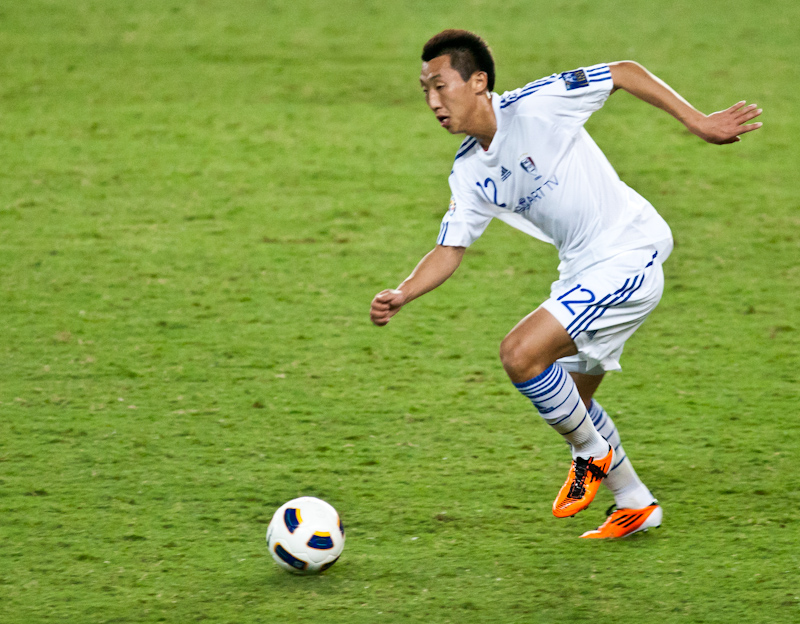

Personal information
- Date of birth: May 15, 1984 (age 42)
- Place of birth: South Korea
- Height: 1.84 m (6 ft 0 in)
- Positions: Winger; striker

Team information
- Current team: Air Force Central
- Number: 22

Youth career
- 2000–2002: Paichai High School
- 2003–2004: Korea University

Senior career*
| Years | Team | Apps | (Gls) |
| 2005–2012 | Suwon Bluewings | 108 | (16) |
| 2013 | Jeju United | 7 | (0) |
| 2014 | Chainat Hornbill | 15 | (4) |
| 2014 | → Army United (loan) | 10 | (3) |
| 2015– | Air Force Central | | |
- * Club domestic league appearances and goals as of 10 December 2014

- Lee Hyun-jin
- Hangul: 이현진
- Hanja: 李炫珍
- RR: I Hyeonjin
- MR: I Hyŏnjin

Lee Hyun-jin (Korean: 이현진; born May 15, 1984) is a South Korean football player.

== Honours ==
=== Club ===
Suwon Bluewings

- K League Classic Champions (1) : 2008
- Korean FA Cup Winners (2) : 2009, 2010
- Korean League Cup Winners (2) : 2005, 2008
- Korean Super Cup Winners (1) : 2005
