= Qanat (disambiguation) =

Qanat is a water management system.

Qanat or Qannat (Persian: قنات) may refer to various places in Iran:

- Qanat, Bushehr
- Qannat, Kavar, Fars Province
- Qanat, Rostam, Fars Province
- Qanat, Sepidan, Fars Province
- Qanat, Kohgiluyeh and Boyer-Ahmad
- Qanat, Lorestan
- Qanat, South Khorasan
- Qanat-e Kasian, Lorestan
- Qnat, Lebanon

== See also ==
- "Qanat" is a common element in Iranian place names, see.
- Qantas (disambiguation) misspelling
