= Khomsianeh (disambiguation) =

Khomsianeh (Persian: خمسيانه) may refer to:

- Khomsianeh
- Khomsianeh-ye Musaabad
- Khomsianeh-ye Pain
- Khomsianeh-ye Rish Sefid
