= Dar Balut =

Dar Balut (Persian: داربلوط) may refer to:

- Cham-e Dar Balut, Ilam Province
- Dar Balut, Qasr-e Shirin, Kermanshah Province
- Dar Balut, Sarpol-e Zahab, Kermanshah Province
- Dar Balut-e Olya, Lorestan Province
- Dar Balut-e Sofla, Lorestan Province
