= Karvansara =

Karvansara or Karavansara or Karevansera may refer to:

- Amre Taza, Armenia
- Karvansara, Gegharkunik, Armenia
- Ijevan, Armenia
- Karvansara, Khuzestan, Iran
- Karvansara, Markazi, Iran
- Karvansara, Naqadeh, West Azerbaijan Province, Iran
- Karvansara, Urmia, West Azerbaijan Province, Iran
- Karvansara, Zanjan, Iran
- Karvansara-ye Olya, Iran
- Karvansara-ye Sofla, Iran

== See also ==
- Caravanserai
