= Hadang =

Urban area in Mokpo, South Korea

Hadang (Korean: 하당신도시) is the newly built urban area in Mokpo, South Jeolla Province, South Korea, which aims at accommodating increased population near Muan International Airport and movement of the provincial office. Before announcement of the transfer of office, Mokpo initially intended to rebuild another area for housing. The project was finalized so until 1999 most of area was leased for marketing, business, housing, and preliminary purpose.

Hadang area was actually pertained to Muan county, while Sang-ri annexed to Mokpo to enlarge city area to make several villages like Sangdong, Sinheungdong in this area. Hadang is just beside newly constructed South Jeolla provincial office about 2 km.

In addition to several reasons, Hadang meets tipping point of national route for Haenam and Muan with strength of holding Daebul industrial complex. The residential area also borders on coastal area near to the Gatbawi cultural street filled with museums like the National Maritime Museum and Natural history museum. Peace plaza resides in Hadang for celebrating Kim Dae-jung who won the Nobel Peace Prize in 2000, equipped with music fountain and several outdoor sceneries with lights.

However, the development of residential area worsened the transfer of population from old downtown to lose balance of the city. Until now, the depression within old downtown is almost unimaginable in that 3 movie theaters shut down, markets and large-scale local distribution company all moved to Hadang. Shareholders in old town says there are no youngsters to boast local economy.

== hadang new city ==
Hadang City is a new city center in Mokpo, South Jeolla Province, and is a project promoted by Mokpo to create new housing sites. The housing site project was completed by 1999, and by early 2003, central commercial land, general commercial land, semi-residential and residential land were sold. The Hadang district grew in size as Sang-ri, which was previously under the jurisdiction of Muan-gun, was incorporated into Mokpo, and Sang-dong was divided into Hadang-dong, and gradually divided into Sinheung-dong and Buheung-dong along with land reclamation. Namak New Town and the Jeonnam Provincial Office are connected to the Hadang district and the downtown area. As of 2001, the land area was 1086,000 pyeong.[1] In addition, the junction where the national roads to Yeongam, Haenam, and Muan split is located at the end of the new downtown, so it was built as a base for securing population as well as the city behind the Daebul Industrial Complex. As downtown Hayeon faces the sea, you can directly access the museum facilities in the Gatbawi Special Tourist Zone after passing through the Gatbawi Tunnel [2]. After changing the name to Peace Plaza, it is being used as a night view business and a leisure center park.

From the 1990s, Mokpo has had Hayeon City and Namak New Town (the seat of South Jeolla Province since November 2005) to the east, Daebul National Industrial Complex (Samho-eup, Yeongam-gun) to the south, Mokpo New Port, Gohado Marine New Town, and North Port to the north. Industrial complexes and industrial complexes have been developed, so the city is expanding regardless of the boundaries of administrative districts, and redevelopment projects such as Seosan, Ongeum District, and Daeseong District are in progress in the original downtown area. In 1981, Yeongsan River Hagutduk was completed, directly connecting the eastern part of the city with Samho-eup, Yeongam-gun. West (North Port), Mokpo New Port, and Daebul Industrial Complex were directly connected.

With the housing site development project in Hayeon City, a large-scale apartment supply was made and the area was expanded to the estuary of the Yeongsan River due to the increase in area. As the basic facilities moved in large numbers, such as the construction of four theaters in Hayeon-do in 2005, the appearance of young people in the original downtown decreased significantly in the evening. Accordingly, the establishment of the Luce Vista Street of Light in the original city center was started in earnest, and commercial districts were revitalized through payment of commercial land rent, etc.

Mokpo opened the Yangeulsan Tunnel on August 24, 2007, connecting the new downtown area of Hayeon City and the old town center where Mokpo City Hall and KBS Mokpo Broadcasting Station are located. In addition, the Mokpo Bridge, which connects the North Port of Bukhang-dong and the Goha Road in Yudal-dong, was opened on June 29, 2012, and the entire route to Goha-daero was completed, and the actual outer ring transportation network of Mokpo was completed.

=== Namak New Town ===
It is a new town planned when the Jeollanam-do Office relocated to Namak-ri, Samhyang-eup, Muan-gun in 2005. Originally, there was a plan to develop the Okam District, an undeveloped district in Okam-dong, Mokpo. The area is 14.5 km2 (14,539,000 m2). The planned population is 150,000 (45,000 households) and the construction companies are Dongkwang Construction and 34 other companies. Mokpo City and Jeonnam Development Corporation are in charge of the development. Some sites were made by reclaiming part of Yeongsan Lake. The provincial new town is being built by reclamation of the tidal flats distributed in Buju-dong, Okam-dong, and Samhyang-dong, Mokpo, Muan-gun, Namak-ri, Samhyang-eup, and Oryong-ri After passing through the Mokpo tollgate in Jeollanam-do, the last stop of the Seohaean Expressway, and exiting at the Illo Interchange, you will see a large sign with an arrow on the right and the words "Jeonnam Provincial Office Relocation Headquarters 8.5km" written on it. If you drive along this road for about 10 minutes, the new town 'Namak New Town', which is being built on 4.4 million pyeong in Ogam-dong, Mokpo, and Illo-eup and Samhyang-myeon, Muan-gun, is in full glory for the relocation of the provincial government. Upon receiving guidance on the 13th and entering about 1 km inward, a large 23-story building towering over a barren field caught my eye. This building is the new Jeonnam Provincial Office building that symbolizes the change here. At the construction site of Namak New Town, there was a loud roar of pokane and excavators. In Namak New Town, a bus-only road (width 21-25m) will be built for the first time in Korea. Bike lanes and pedestrian-only roads are also secured on the bus-only road to be built in the 5.5 km section that connects the city center and Mokpo city center from the bus terminal.

- Hadang City and Namak New Town are newly developed new towns included in Mokpo.

== Area ==
- Hadang-dong
- Sinheung-dong
- Buheung-dong
- Okam-dong
- Buju-dong
- Sang-dong
- Samhyang-dong
