= Karavansaray =

Karavansaray or Karavansarai may refer to:

- Ijevan, Armenia, a town formerly known as Karavansarai
- Caravanserai, a roadside inn

== See also ==
- Karvansara (disambiguation)
- Karvansara-ye Olya
- Karvansara-ye Sofla
