= Qaleh-ye Rahim =

Qaleh-ye Rahim قلعه رحيم
- Village
- Location within Iran
- Coordinates: 33°36′03″N 48°36′19″E
- Country: Iran
- Province: Lorestan
- County: Khorramabad
- Bakhsh: Bayravand
- Rural District: Beyranvand-e Jonubi

Population (2006)
  - Total: 235
- Time zone: UTC+3:30 (IRST)
  - Summer (DST): UTC+4:30 (IRDT)

Qaleh-ye Rahim (Persian: قلعه رحيم, also Romanized as Qal‘eh-ye Raḩīm and Qal‘eh Raḩīm) is a village in Beyranvand-e Jonubi Rural District, Bayravand District, Khorramabad County, Lorestan Province, Iran. At the 2006 census, its population was 235, in 52 families.
