= Darreh-ye Bizhan =

Darreh-ye Bizhan (Persian: دره بيژن) may refer to:

- Darreh-ye Bizhan-e Olya
- Darreh-ye Bizhan-e Sofla
- Darreh-ye Bizhan-e Vosta
