= Seyl Nazar =

Seyl Nazar سيل نظر
- Village
- Location within Iran
- Coordinates: 33°37′06″N 48°33′43″E
- Country: Iran
- Province: Lorestan
- County: Khorramabad
- Bakhsh: Bayravand
- Rural District: Beyranvand-e Jonubi

Population (2006)
  - Total: 113
- Time zone: UTC+3:30 (IRST)
  - Summer (DST): UTC+4:30 (IRDT)

Seyl Nazar (Persian: سيل نظر, also Romanized as Seyl Naz̧ar) is a village in Beyranvand-e Jonubi Rural District, Bayravand District, Khorramabad County, Lorestan Province, Iran. At the 2006 census, its population was 113, in 24 families.
