= Kasian =

Kasian, Kaseyan, Kasiyan, Kasyan orKhasian (Persian: كاسيان) may refer to:

- Kasian, Chaypareh, West Azerbaijan Province
- Kasian, Urmia, West Azerbaijan Province
- Kasian-e Rostam Khani
- Qaleh-ye Kasian
- Qanat-e Kasian
- Kasi (Pashtun tribe)
