= Mahrokhi Kalleh Jub =

Mahrokhi Kalleh Jub ماهرخي كله جوب
- Village
- Country: Iran
- Province: Lorestan
- County: Khorramabad
- Bakhsh: Bayravand
- Rural District: Beyranvand-e Jonubi

Population (2006)
  - Total: 15
- Time zone: UTC+3:30 (IRST)
  - Summer (DST): UTC+4:30 (IRDT)

Mahrokhi Kalleh Jub (Persian: ماهرخي كله جوب, also Romanized as Māhrokhī Kalleh Jūb) is a village in Beyranvand-e Jonubi Rural District, Bayravand District, Khorramabad County, Lorestan Province, Iran. At the 2006 census, its population was 15, in 5 families.
