= Chaqabol (disambiguation) =

Chaqabol (Persian: چقابل) is a city in Lorestan Province, Iran.

Chaqabol or Chaqabal (Persian: چقابل) may also refer to:

- Chaqabol, Borujerd, a village in Borujerd County, Lorestan Province, Iran
- Chaqabal, Khorramabad, a village in Khorramabad County, Lorestan Province, Iran
- Cheyabel, a village in Khorramabad County, Lorestan Province, Iran
- Chaqabol, Selseleh, a village in Selseleh County, Lorestan Province, Iran
