= Sargul-e Namak =

Sargul-e Namak سرگول نمك
- Village
- Location within Iran
- Coordinates: 33°32′55″N 48°31′41″E
- Country: Iran
- Province: Lorestan
- County: Khorramabad
- Bakhsh: Bayravand
- Rural District: Beyranvand-e Jonubi

Population (2006)
  - Total: 187
- Time zone: UTC+3:30 (IRST)
  - Summer (DST): UTC+4:30 (IRDT)

Sargul-e Namak (Persian: سرگول نمك, also Romanized as Sargūl-e Namaḵ) is a village in Beyranvand-e Jonubi Rural District, Bayravand District, Khorramabad County, Lorestan Province, Iran. At the 2006 census, its population was 187, in 43 families.
