= Namak =

Namak may refer to:

- Namak, South Korea
- Namak-ri
- Namaklan-e Olya, Iran
- Namaklan-e Sofla, Iran
- Namak Lake, Iran
- Namak (film), a Bollywood film starring Sanjay Dutt

== See also ==
- Namek, a Dragon Ball character
- Namakkal, town in Tamil Nadu, India
- Namaka (disambiguation)
- Namakagon (disambiguation)
