= Darreh Besar =

Darreh Besar دره بسر
- Village
- Location within Iran
- Coordinates: 33°35′00″N 48°36′00″E
- Country: Iran
- Province: Lorestan
- County: Khorramabad
- Bakhsh: Bayravand
- Rural District: Beyranvand-e Jonubi

Population (2006)
  - Total: 40
- Time zone: UTC+3:30 (IRST)
  - Summer (DST): UTC+4:30 (IRDT)

Darreh Besar (Persian: دره بسر, also known as Darreh Besar-e Pā’īn and Darreh Besar-e Soflá) is a village in Beyranvand-e Jonubi Rural District, Bayravand District, Khorramabad County, Lorestan province, Iran. At the 2006 census, its population was 40, in 9 families.
