= Tappeh Goji =

Village in Lorestan province, Iran

Tappeh Goji Persian: تپه گجي
- Village
- Location within Iran
- Coordinates: 33°40′05″N 48°31′51″E
- Country: Iran
- Province: Lorestan
- County: Khorramabad
- District: Beyranvand
- Rural District: Beyranvand-e Shomali

Population (2016)
  - Total: 857
- Time zone: UTC+3:30 (IRST)

Tappeh Goji (Persian: تپه گجي) (Note: Also romanized as Tappeh Gojī; also known as Tappeh Gachī, Tappeh Kojī, Tappeh-ye Gorg, and Tepe Gurg) is a village in Beyranvand-e Shomali Rural District of Beyranvand District (Note: Formerly Chaghalvandi District) in Khorramabad County, Lorestan province, Iran.

== Demographics ==
=== Population ===
At the time of the 2006 National Census, the village's population was 821 in 171 households. The following census in 2011 counted 814 people in 199 households. The 2016 census measured the population of the village as 857 people in 231 households, the most populous in its rural district.
