= Baqla Kuh =

Village in Lorestan province, Iran

Baqla Kuh Persian: باقلاكوه
- Village
- Location within Iran
- Coordinates: 33°38′30″N 48°40′41″E
- Country: Iran
- Province: Lorestan
- County: Khorramabad
- District: Beyranvand
- Rural District: Beyranvand-e Jonubi

Population (2016)
  - Total: 230
- Time zone: UTC+3:30 (IRST)

Baqla Kuh (Persian: باقلاكوه) (Note: Also romanized as Bāqalā Kūh, Bāqelā Kūh, and Bāqlā Kūh; also known as Bāqelākān-e Bālā, Bāqeleh Khān, Bāqeleh Kūb, Bāqlā Khān, Bāqlā Kūb, and Bāqlākūb-e ‘Olyā) is a village in Beyranvand-e Jonubi Rural District of Beyranvand District (Note: Formerly Chaghalvandi District) in Khorramabad County, Lorestan province, Iran.

== Demographics ==
=== Population ===
At the time of the 2006 National Census, the village's population was 201 in 43 households. The following census in 2011 counted 233 people in 55 households. The 2016 census measured the population of the village as 230 people in 63 households.
