= Namaklan =

Namaklan or Namak Kalan (Persian: نمكلان) may refer to various villages in Iran:

- Namak Alan
- Namaklan-e Olya
- Namaklan-e Sofla
