= Darreh-ye Bizhan-e Olya =

Darreh-ye Bizhan-e Olya دره بيژن عليا
- Village
- Location within Iran
- Coordinates: 33°41′30″N 48°37′21″E
- Country: Iran
- Province: Lorestan
- County: Khorramabad
- Bakhsh: Bayravand
- Rural District: Beyranvand-e Jonubi

Population (2006)
  - Total: 76
- Time zone: UTC+3:30 (IRST)
  - Summer (DST): UTC+4:30 (IRDT)

Darreh-ye Bizhan-e Olya (Persian: دره بيژن عليا, also Romanized as Darreh-ye Bīzhan-e 'Olyā) is a village in Beyranvand-e Jonubi Rural District, Bayravand District, Khorramabad County, Lorestan province, Iran. At the 2006 census, its population was 76, in 15 families.
