= Qantas (disambiguation) =

Qantas is the flag carrier airline of Australia.

Qantas may also refer to:

- Qantas (genus), a genus of trematosauroid temnospondyl from the Early Triassic
- Qantas Awards (disambiguation)
- Qantas Defence Services, a defense service now part of Northrop Grumman
- Qudos Bank, formerly Qantas Credit Union, an Australian credit union

== See also ==
- Qanat (disambiguation)
- Quanta (disambiguation)
