= Khomsianeh-ye Musaabad =

Khomsianeh-ye Musaabad خمسيانه موسي اباد
- Village
- Location within Iran
- Coordinates: 33°39′00″N 48°41′00″E
- Country: Iran
- Province: Lorestan
- County: Khorramabad
- Bakhsh: Bayravand
- Rural District: Beyranvand-e Jonubi

Population (2006)
  - Total: 19
- Time zone: UTC+3:30 (IRST)
  - Summer (DST): UTC+4:30 (IRDT)

Khomsianeh-ye Musaabad (Persian: خمسيانه موسي اباد, also Romanized as Khomsīāneh-ye Mūsáābād) is a village in Beyranvand-e Jonubi Rural District, Bayravand District, Khorramabad County, Lorestan Province, Iran. At the 2006 census, its population was 19, in 4 families.
