= Gol Zard, Khorramabad =

Village in Lorestan province, Iran

Gol Zard Persian: گلزرد
- Village
- Location within Iran
- Coordinates: 33°43′00″N 48°25′46″E
- Country: Iran
- Province: Lorestan
- County: Khorramabad
- District: Beyranvand
- Rural District: Beyranvand-e Shomali

Population (2016)
  - Total: 103
- Time zone: UTC+3:30 (IRST)

Gol Zard (Persian: گلزرد) (Note: Also romanized as Gol-e Zard; also known as Golzard-e Bālā) is a village in Beyranvand-e Shomali Rural District of Beyranvand District (Note: Formerly Chaghalvandi District) in Khorramabad County, Lorestan province, Iran.

== Demographics ==
=== Population ===
At the time of the 2006 National Census, the village's population was 105 in 17 households. The following census in 2011 counted 88 people in 21 households. The 2016 census measured the population of the village as 103 people in 26 households.
