= Khar Eshgaft =

Village in Lorestan province, Iran

Khar Eshgaft Persian: خراشگفت
- Village
- Location within Iran
- Coordinates: 33°46′47″N 48°34′33″E
- Country: Iran
- Province: Lorestan
- County: Khorramabad
- District: Beyranvand
- Rural District: Beyranvand-e Shomali

Population (2016)
  - Total: 162
- Time zone: UTC+3:30 (IRST)

Khar Eshgaft (Persian: خراشگفت) (Note: Also known as Karreh Shekāf, Khar Eshkaft, and Khareh Eshgaft) is a village in, and the former capital of, Beyranvand-e Shomali Rural District in Beyranvand District (Note: Formerly Chaghalvandi District) of Khorramabad County, Lorestan province, Iran. The capital of the rural district has been transferred to the village of Bid Hal.

== Demographics ==
=== Population ===
At the time of the 2006 National Census, the village's population was 113 in 24 households. The following census in 2011 counted 112 people in 29 households. The 2016 census measured the population of the village as 162 people in 42 households.
