= Khomsianeh-ye Pain =

Khomsianeh-ye Pain خمسيانه پائين
- Village
- Location within Iran
- Coordinates: 33°38′17″N 48°39′08″E
- Country: Iran
- Province: Lorestan
- County: Khorramabad
- Bakhsh: Bayravand
- Rural District: Beyranvand-e Jonubi

Population (2006)
  - Total: 142
- Time zone: UTC+3:30 (IRST)
  - Summer (DST): UTC+4:30 (IRDT)

Khomsianeh-ye Pain (Persian: خمسيانه پائين, also Romanized as Khomsīāneh-ye Pā‘īn; also known as Khomsīāneh-ye Soflá) is a village in Beyranvand-e Jonubi Rural District, Bayravand District, Khorramabad County, Lorestan Province, Iran. At the 2006 census, its population was 142, in 30 families.
