= Darber-e Razbashi =

Darber-e Razbashi داربررازباشي
- Village
- Location within Iran
- Coordinates: 33°41′44″N 48°27′40″E
- Country: Iran
- Province: Lorestan
- County: Khorramabad
- Bakhsh: Bayravand
- Rural District: Beyranvand-e Shomali

Population (2006)
  - Total: 60
- Time zone: UTC+3:30 (IRST)
  - Summer (DST): UTC+4:30 (IRDT)

Darber-e Razbashi (Persian: داربررازباشي, also Romanized as Dārber-e Rāzbāshī; also known as Rāzbāshī Dārbar) is a village in Beyranvand-e Shomali Rural District, Bayravand District, Khorramabad County, Lorestan Province, Iran. At the 2006 census, its population was 60, in 13 families.
