= Bid Hal =

Village in Lorestan province, Iran

Bid Hal Persian: بيدهل
- Village
- Location within Iran
- Coordinates: 33°41′59″N 48°29′56″E
- Country: Iran
- Province: Lorestan
- County: Khorramabad
- District: Beyranvand
- Rural District: Beyranvand-e Shomali

Population (2016)
  - Total: 214
- Time zone: UTC+3:30 (IRST)

Bid Hal (Persian: بيدهل) (Note: Also romanized as Bīd Ḩal and Bīd Hel; also known as Bīd Gol and Eslāmābād) is a village in, and the capital of, Beyranvand-e Shomali Rural District in Beyranvand District (Note: Formerly Chaghalvandi District) of Khorramabad County, Lorestan province, Iran. The previous capital of the rural district was the village of Khar Eshgaft.

== Demographics ==
=== Population ===
At the time of the 2006 National Census, the village's population was 294 in 65 households. The following census in 2011 counted 234 people in 59 households. The 2016 census measured the population of the village as 214 people in 58 households.
