= Tappeh Shir Khan =

Village in Lorestan province, Iran

Tappeh Shir Khan Persian: تپه شيرخان
- Village
- Location within Iran
- Coordinates: 33°46′13″N 48°33′41″E
- Country: Iran
- Province: Lorestan
- County: Khorramabad
- District: Beyranvand
- Rural District: Beyranvand-e Shomali

Population (2016)
  - Total: 142
- Time zone: UTC+3:30 (IRST)

Tappeh Shir Khan (Persian: تپه شيرخان) (Note: Also romanized as Tappeh Shīr Khān and Tappeh-ye Shīrkhān) is a village in Beyranvand-e Shomali Rural District of Beyranvand District (Note: Formerly Chaghalvandi District) in Khorramabad County, Lorestan province, Iran.

== Demographics ==
=== Population ===
At the time of the 2006 National Census, the village's population was 155 in 34 households. The following census in 2011 counted 149 people in 38 households. The 2016 census measured the population of the village as 142 people in 32 households.
