= Darreh-ye Bizhan-e Vosta =

Darreh-ye Bizhan-e Vosta دره بيژن وسطي
- Village
- Location within Iran
- Coordinates: 33°41′15″N 48°37′42″E
- Country: Iran
- Province: Lorestan
- County: Khorramabad
- Bakhsh: Bayravand
- Rural District: Beyranvand-e Jonubi

Population (2006)
  - Total: 171
- Time zone: UTC+3:30 (IRST)
  - Summer (DST): UTC+4:30 (IRDT)

Darreh-ye Bizhan-e Vosta (Persian: دره بيژن وسطي, also Romanized as Darreh-ye Bīzhan-e Vosţá) is a village in Beyranvand-e Jonubi Rural District, Bayravand District, Khorramabad County, Lorestan Province, Iran. At the 2006 census, its population was 171, in 34 families.
