= Sarab-e Darab =

Village in Lorestan province, Iran

Sarab-e Darab Persian: سراب داراب
- Village
- Location within Iran
- Coordinates: 33°36′40″N 48°32′10″E
- Country: Iran
- Province: Lorestan
- County: Khorramabad
- District: Beyranvand
- Rural District: Beyranvand-e Jonubi

Population (2016)
  - Total: 220
- Time zone: UTC+3:30 (IRST)

Sarab-e Darab (Persian: سراب داراب) (Note: Also romanized as Sarāb-e Dārāb) is a village in Beyranvand-e Jonubi Rural District of Beyranvand District (Note: Formerly Chaghalvandi District) in Khorramabad County, Lorestan province, Iran.

== Demographics ==
=== Population ===
At the time of the 2006 National Census, the village's population was 200 in 46 households. The following census in 2011 counted 200 people in 51 households. The 2016 census measured the population of the village as 220 people in 59 households.
