= Razbashi =

Razbashi (Persian: رازباشي) may refer to:

- Buganeh Razbashi
- Chenar-e Razbashi
- Darber-e Razbashi
