= Qaleh-ye Kasian =

Qaleh-ye Kasian قلعه كاسيان
- Village
- Location within Iran
- Coordinates: 33°38′30″N 48°37′21″E
- Country: Iran
- Province: Lorestan
- County: Khorramabad
- Bakhsh: Bayravand
- Rural District: Beyranvand-e Jonubi

Population (2006)
  - Total: 71
- Time zone: UTC+3:30 (IRST)
  - Summer (DST): UTC+4:30 (IRDT)

Qaleh-ye Kasian (Persian: قلعه كاسيان, also Romanized as Qal‘eh-ye Kāsīān and Qal‘eh-ye Kāseyān; also known as Kāsīān, Kāsīān-e Bālā, Kāsīān Qal‘eh, Kāsīyān, and Khāsīān) is a village in Beyranvand-e Jonubi Rural District, Bayravand District, Khorramabad County, Lorestan Province, Iran. At the 2006 census, its population was 71, in 16 families.
