= Sarab-e Elyas =

Village in Lorestan province, Iran

Sarab-e Elyas Persian: سراب الياس
- Village
- Location within Iran
- Coordinates: 33°39′50″N 48°33′30″E
- Country: Iran
- Province: Lorestan
- County: Khorramabad
- District: Beyranvand
- Rural District: Beyranvand-e Jonubi

Population (2016)
  - Total: 507
- Time zone: UTC+3:30 (IRST)

Sarab-e Elyas (Persian: سراب الياس) (Note: Also romanized as Sarāb-e Elyās; also known as Sarab ‘Alīwās and Sarb ‘Alīwās) is a village in Beyranvand-e Jonubi Rural District of Beyranvand District (Note: Formerly Chaghalvandi District) in Khorramabad County, Lorestan province, Iran.

== Demographics ==
=== Population ===
At the time of the 2006 National Census, the village's population was 516 in 103 households. The following census in 2011 counted 488 people in 123 households. The 2016 census measured the population of the village as 507 people in 149 households.
