= Chiabol =

Chiabol (Persian: چیابل) may refer to:

- Cheyabel
- Sharaf Bag
