= Dar Balut-e Pain =

Village in Lorestan province, Iran

Dar Balut-e Pain Persian: داربلوط پايين
- Village
- Location within Iran
- Coordinates: 33°41′46″N 48°32′58″E
- Country: Iran
- Province: Lorestan
- County: Khorramabad
- District: Beyranvand
- Rural District: Beyranvand-e Shomali

Population (2016)
  - Total: 651
- Time zone: UTC+3:30 (IRST)

Dar Balut-e Pain (Persian: داربلوط پايين) (Note: Also romanized as Dār Balūt Pāīn and Dār Balūţ-e Pā’īn; formerly known as Dar Balut-e Sofla (داربلوطسفلي), also romanized as Dār Balūţ-e Soflá; also known as Dār Balūţeh Soflá) is a village in Beyranvand-e Shomali Rural District of Beyranvand District (Note: Formerly Chaghalvandi District) in Khorramabad County, Lorestan province, Iran.

== Demographics ==
=== Population ===
At the time of the 2006 National Census, the village's population, as Dar Balut-e Sofla, was 526 in 119 households. The following census in 2011 counted 657 people in 166 households, by which time the village was listed as Dar Balut-e Pain. The 2016 census measured the population of the village as 651 people in 184 households.
