= Kasian-e Rostam Khani =

Village in Lorestan province, Iran

Kasian-e Rostam Khani Persian: كاسيان رستمخاني
- Village
- Location within Iran
- Coordinates: 33°39′06″N 48°37′46″E
- Country: Iran
- Province: Lorestan
- County: Khorramabad
- District: Beyranvand
- Rural District: Beyranvand-e Jonubi

Population (2016)
  - Total: 435
- Time zone: UTC+3:30 (IRST)

Kasian-e Rostam Khani (Persian: كاسيان رستمخاني) (Note: Also romanized as Kāsīān-e Rostam Khānī; also known as Rostam Khānī and Rostam Khānī-ye Kaseyān) is a village in Beyranvand-e Jonubi Rural District of Beyranvand District (Note: Formerly Chaghalvandi District) in Khorramabad County, Lorestan province, Iran.

== Demographics ==
=== Population ===
At the time of the 2006 National Census, the village's population was 455 in 99 households. The following census in 2011 counted 380 people in 93 households. The 2016 census measured the population of the village as 435 people in 116 households.
