= Dar Balut-e Olya =

Village in Lorestan province, Iran

Dar Balut-e Olya Persian: داربلوطعليا
- Village
- Location within Iran
- Coordinates: 33°41′53″N 48°33′33″E
- Country: Iran
- Province: Lorestan
- County: Khorramabad
- District: Beyranvand
- Rural District: Beyranvand-e Shomali

Population (2016)
  - Total: 325
- Time zone: UTC+3:30 (IRST)

Dar Balut-e Olya (Persian: داربلوطعليا) (Note: Also romanized as Dār Balūţ-e 'Olyā; also known as Dār Balūţ-e Bālā) is a village in Beyranvand-e Shomali Rural District of Beyranvand District (Note: Formerly Chaghalvandi District) in Khorramabad County, Lorestan province, Iran.

== Demographics ==
=== Population ===
At the time of the 2006 National Census, the village's population was 421 in 95 households. The following census in 2011 counted 303 people in 81 households. The 2016 census measured the population of the village as 325 people in 92 households.
