= Chaqabal, Khorramabad =

Village in Lorestan province, Iran

Chaqabal Persian: چقابل
- Village
- Location within Iran
- Coordinates: 33°39′58″N 48°31′09″E
- Country: Iran
- Province: Lorestan
- County: Khorramabad
- District: Beyranvand
- Rural District: Beyranvand-e Shomali

Population (2016)
  - Total: 136
- Time zone: UTC+3:30 (IRST)

Chaqabal (Persian: چقابل) (Note: Also romanized as Chaqābal; also known as Chaghābd) is a village in Beyranvand-e Shomali Rural District of Beyranvand District (Note: Formerly Chaghalvandi District) in Khorramabad County, Lorestan province, Iran.

== Demographics ==
=== Population ===
At the time of the 2006 National Census, the village's population was 116 in 26 households. The following census in 2011 counted 103 people in 28 households. The 2016 census measured the population of the village as 136 people in 42 households.
