= Sharaf Bag =

Village in Lorestan province, Iran

Sharaf Bag Persian: شرفبگ
- Village
- Location within Iran
- Coordinates: 33°40′24″N 48°39′36″E
- Country: Iran
- Province: Lorestan
- County: Khorramabad
- District: Beyranvand
- Rural District: Beyranvand-e Jonubi

Population (2016)
  - Total: 356
- Time zone: UTC+3:30 (IRST)

Sharaf Bag (Persian: شرفبگ) (Note: Also known as Chīābol) is a village in Beyranvand-e Jonubi Rural District of Beyranvand District (Note: Formerly Chaghalvandi District) in Khorramabad County, Lorestan province, Iran.

== Demographics ==
=== Population ===
At the time of the 2006 National Census, the village's population was 314 in 66 households. The following census in 2011 counted 353 people in 93 households. The 2016 census measured the population of the village as 356 people in 105 households.
