= Cheyabel =

Cheyabel چيابل
- Village
- Location within Iran
- Coordinates: 33°40′02″N 48°39′14″E
- Country: Iran
- Province: Lorestan
- County: Khorramabad
- Bakhsh: Bayravand
- Rural District: Beyranvand-e Jonubi

Population (2006)
  - Total: 37
- Time zone: UTC+3:30 (IRST)
  - Summer (DST): UTC+4:30 (IRDT)

Cheyabel (Persian: چيابل, also Romanized as Cheyābel; also known as Qal‘eh-ye 'Alī Bakhsh, Chaqābal, Chaqāwal, Chīābol, Choghālbal-e 'Alībakhsh, and Qal‘eh 'Ali Bakhsh) is a village in Beyranvand-e Jonubi Rural District, Bayravand District, Khorramabad County, Lorestan province, Iran. At the 2006 census, its population was 37, in 8 families.
