= Qanat-e Kasian =

Qanat-e Kasian قناتكاسيان
- Village
- Location within Iran
- Coordinates: 33°39′04″N 48°37′44″E
- Country: Iran
- Province: Lorestan
- County: Khorramabad
- Bakhsh: Bayravand
- Rural District: Beyranvand-e Jonubi

Population (2006)
  - Total: 212
- Time zone: UTC+3:30 (IRST)
  - Summer (DST): UTC+4:30 (IRDT)

Qanat-e Kasian (Persian: قناتكاسيان, also Romanized as Qanāt-e Kāsīān; also known as Kāsīān, Kāsīān-e Pā’īn, Kāsīān-e Soflá, and Khāsiān) is a village in Beyranvand-e Jonubi Rural District, Bayravand District, Khorramabad County, Lorestan Province, Iran. At the 2006 census, its population was 212, in 44 families.
