= Namakzar =

Namakzar (Persian: نمکزار; meaning "salt lake") may refer to:

- Namakzar-e Shahdad
- Namakzar-e Nalak
- Chah-e Namakzar
- Daghal-e Namakzar
- Kowl-e Namakzar
- Rud-e Namakzar

== See also ==
- Namak (disambiguation)
