= Para Puneh =

Village in Lorestan province, Iran

Para Puneh Persian: پاراپونه
- Village
- Location within Iran
- Coordinates: 33°39′34″N 48°37′04″E
- Country: Iran
- Province: Lorestan
- County: Khorramabad
- District: Beyranvand
- Rural District: Beyranvand-e Jonubi

Population (2016)
  - Total: 384
- Time zone: UTC+3:30 (IRST)

Para Puneh (Persian: پاراپونه) (Note: Also romanized as Pārā Pūneh; also known as Par Pīūneh, Para Pīvna, Parah Puneh, Pārāh Pūneh, Pūneh, and Qanāt) is a village in Beyranvand-e Jonubi Rural District of Beyranvand District (Note: Formerly Chaghalvandi District) in Khorramabad County, Lorestan province, Iran.

== Demographics ==
=== Population ===
At the time of the 2006 National Census, the village's population was 166 in 36 households. The following census in 2011 counted 190 people in 49 households. The 2016 census measured the population of the village as 384 people in 61 households.
