= Khasian =

Khasian may refer to:

- Kasian (disambiguation)
- Khasian languages
