= Karvansara-ye Sofla =

Karvansara-ye Sofla كاروانسراسفلي
- Village
- Location within Iran
- Coordinates: 33°46′22″N 48°30′12″E
- Country: Iran
- Province: Lorestan
- County: Khorramabad
- Bakhsh: Bayravand
- Rural District: Beyranvand-e Shomali

Population (2006)
  - Total: 40
- Time zone: UTC+3:30 (IRST)
  - Summer (DST): UTC+4:30 (IRDT)

Karvansara-ye Sofla (Persian: كاروانسراسفلي, also Romanized as Kārvānsarā-ye Soflá; also known as Kārvānsarā, Kāravānsarā, and Kāravānsarā-ye Bālā) is a village in Beyranvand-e Shomali Rural District, Bayravand District, Khorramabad County, Lorestan Province, Iran. At the 2006 census, its population was 40, in 9 families.
