= Karvansara-ye Olya =

Karvansara-ye Olya كاروانسراعليا
- Village
- Location within Iran
- Coordinates: 33°45′59″N 48°29′42″E
- Country: Iran
- Province: Lorestan
- County: Khorramabad
- Bakhsh: Bayravand
- Rural District: Beyranvand-e Shomali

Population (2006)
  - Total: 10
- Time zone: UTC+3:30 (IRST)
  - Summer (DST): UTC+4:30 (IRDT)

Karvansara-ye Olya (Persian: كاروانسراعليا, also Romanized as Karvansarā-ye ‘Olyā; also known as Karvansarā) is a village in Beyranvand-e Shomali Rural District, Bayravand District, Khorramabad County, Lorestan Province, Iran. At the 2006 census, its population was 10, in 4 families.
