= Buganeh Razbashi =

Village in Lorestan province, Iran

Buganeh Razbashi Persian: بوگنه رازباشي
- Village
- Location within Iran
- Coordinates: 33°41′30″N 48°27′08″E
- Country: Iran
- Province: Lorestan
- County: Khorramabad
- District: Beyranvand
- Rural District: Beyranvand-e Shomali

Population (2016)
  - Total: 165
- Time zone: UTC+3:30 (IRST)

Buganeh Razbashi (Persian: بوگنه رازباشي) (Note: Also romanized as Būganeh Rāzbāshī; also known as Rāzbāshī) is a village in Beyranvand-e Shomali Rural District of Beyranvand District (Note: Formerly Chaghalvandi District) in Khorramabad County, Lorestan province, Iran.

== Demographics ==
=== Population ===
At the time of the 2006 National Census, the village's population was 140 in 31 households. The following census in 2011 counted 137 people in 35 households. The 2016 census measured the population of the village as 165 people in 48 households.
