= Namaklan-e Bala =

Village in Lorestan province, Iran

Namaklan-e Bala Persian: نمکلان بالا
- Village
- Location within Iran
- Coordinates: 33°33′20″N 48°30′52″E
- Country: Iran
- Province: Lorestan
- County: Khorramabad
- District: Beyranvand
- Rural District: Beyranvand-e Jonubi

Population (2016)
  - Total: 540
- Time zone: UTC+3:30 (IRST)

Namaklan-e Bala (Persian: نمکلان بالا) (Note: Also romanized as Namaklān-e Bālā; formerly known as Namaklan-e Olya (نمکلان علیا), also romanized as Namaklān-e ‘Olyā; also known as Namakgelān-e ‘Olyā) is a village in Beyranvand-e Jonubi Rural District of Beyranvand District (Note: Formerly Chaghalvandi District) in Khorramabad County, Lorestan province, Iran.

== Demographics ==
=== Population ===
At the time of the 2006 National Census, the village's population, as Namaklan-e Olya, was 405 in 81 households. The following census in 2011 counted 119 people in 30 households, by which time the village was listed as Namaklan-e Bala. The 2016 census measured the population of the village as 540 people in 127 households, the most populous in its rural district.
