= Namakagon =

Namakagon can refer to:

- Namakagon, Wisconsin
- Namakagon River, a river that runs through Bayfield County, Wisconsin
- Lake Namakagon, a lake in Wisconsin
- USS Namakagon, a gas tanker that served in the US Navy

== See also ==
- Namak (disambiguation)
- Nema kajanja
- Nematicon
