= Namaka =

Namaka may refer to:

- Nāmaka, Hawaiian mythological sea goddess
- Namaka (moon), inner moon of the dwarf planet Haumea
- Namaka, Alberta, hamlet in southern Alberta, Canada
- Namaka, Fiji, a place in Fiji next to Nadi, home of Pacific Island Air

== See also ==
- Namak (disambiguation)
