= Quanta =

Quanta is the plural of quantum.

Quanta may also refer to:

== Organisations ==
- Quanta Computer, a Taiwan-based manufacturer of electronic and computer equipment
- Quanta Display Inc., a Taiwanese TFT-LCD panel manufacturer acquired by AU Optronics
- QUANTA, a user group for the Sinclair QL computer
- Quanta Services, a US-based speciality contractor for the electric, gas, and telecommunications industries
- Quanta Technology, a utility infrastructure consulting company

== Technology ==
- Quanta, an algorithm for random number generation for smart contracts

== Music ==
- Quanta, a 1997 album by Gilberto Gil
- Quanta Live, a Grammy Award-winning 1998 album by Gilberto Gil

== Science ==
- Quanta (journal), an open-access academic journal
- Quanta Magazine, a magazine covering developments in science

== Others ==
- A line of bowling balls by Brunswick Bowling & Billiards
- Quanta cura, a papal encyclical issued by Pope Pius IX on 8 December 1864
