= Namaklan-e Pain =

Village in Lorestan province, Iran

Namaklan-e Pain Persian: نمکلان پايين
- Village
- Location within Iran
- Coordinates: 33°33′05″N 48°31′22″E
- Country: Iran
- Province: Lorestan
- County: Khorramabad
- District: Beyranvand
- Rural District: Beyranvand-e Jonubi

Population (2016)
  - Total: 115
- Time zone: UTC+3:30 (IRST)

Namaklan-e Pain (Persian: نمکلان پايين) (Note: Also romanized as Namaklān-e Pā’īn; formerly known as Namaklan-e Sofla (نمکلان سفلی), also romanized as Namaklān-e Soflá; also known as Namakgelān-e Soflá) is a village in Beyranvand-e Jonubi Rural District of Beyranvand District (Note: Formerly Chaghalvandi District) in Khorramabad County, Lorestan province, Iran.

== Demographics ==
=== Population ===
At the time of the 2006 National Census, the village's population, as Namaklan-e Sofla, was 76 in 15 households. The following census in 2011 counted 467 people in 123 households, by which time the village was listed as Namaklan-e Pain. The 2016 census measured the population of the village as 115 people in 31 households.
