= Namak-ri =

Village in South Jeolla, South Korea

Coordinates: 34°49′01″N 126°27′47″E

- Hangul: 남악리
- Hanja: 南岳里
- RR: Namak-ri
- MR: Namak-ri

Namak-ri is a village in the township of Samhyang-myeon in Muan County, South Jeolla province of South Korea. In 2005, Namak was made capital of the province following the upgrade of Gwangju to a metropolitan city.

== Overview ==
The relocation of the provincial office to Namak has led to many changes in the area. Once a small farming area with most residents working in that industry, the village is seeing construction of a new city around the office with its neighboring city Mokpo.

== Construction plan ==
The central government officially declared a plan to build a new city on May 13, 1993.

Eight years later, it was announced the residential area would occupy 9,139,000 square metres (98,370,000 sq ft). Jeonnam province applied for approval in February 2002. Four months later the official plan was changed and it received approval.

== Eco city ==
Muan country is strongly trying to develop the Namak area as an "eco-city". This includes elevating the importance of establishing parks and forests.

== Promotion to city ==
The plan for promoting county to city is on the way by civil workers of Muan. The South Korean government has set its standards for making the new site.

Muan was nominated as an enterprise city and also Muan International Airport was opened. One officer said that new downtown area is going to get its own power by governmental development propulsion.
