= Seonggaksa =

South Korean Buddhist temple

Seonggak Temple
- Location within South Korea

Religion
- Affiliation: Buddhism

Location
- Location: Oenam-ri, Docho-myeon, Sinan County, South Jeolla
- Country: South Korea
- Coordinates: 34.6975°N 125.93944°E

Architecture
- Elevation: 36 m (118 ft)

Korean name
- Hangul: 성각사지
- RR: Seonggaksaji
- MR: Sŏnggaksaji

Seonggaksa was a temple located in Dochodo, South Jeolla, South Korea.
