= Beyranshahr =

City in Lorestan province, Iran

Beyranshahr Persian: بيرانشهر
- City
- Location within Iran
- Coordinates: 33°38′51″N 48°33′33″E
- Country: Iran
- Province: Lorestan
- County: Khorramabad
- District: Beyranvand

Population (2016)
  - Total: 1,720
- Time zone: UTC+3:30 (IRST)

Beyranshahr (Persian: بیرانشهر) (Note: Formerly Chaghalvandi (چغلوندی), also romanized as Chaghalvandī; also known as Chagharvand, Chaqalvandī, Chaqalwandi, and Chaqharvand) is a city in, and the capital of, Beyranvand District (Note: Formerly Chaghalvandi District) of Khorramabad County, Lorestan province, Iran.

== Demographics ==
=== Population ===
At the time of the 2006 National Census, the city's population was 1,544 in 336 households. The following census in 2011 counted 1,409 people in 322 households. The 2016 census measured the population of the city as 1,720 people in 471 households.

The people of this region are mainly from the Lak Beyranvand tribes and other tribes such as Qaed Rahmat, Dalvand, and Yarahmadi.
