= Cham-e Dar Balut =

Village in Ilam, Iran

Cham-e Dar Balut چمداربلوط
- Village
- Location within Iran
- Coordinates: 33°28′06″N 46°55′33″E
- Country: Iran
- Province: Ilam
- County: Sirvan
- Bakhsh: Central
- Rural District: Rudbar

Population (2006)
  - Total: 104
- Time zone: UTC+3:30 (IRST)
  - Summer (DST): UTC+4:30 (IRDT)

Cham-e Dar Balut (Persian: چمداربلوط, also Romanized as Cham-e Dār Balūţ; also known as Dār Balūţ) is a village in Rudbar Rural District, Central District, Sirvan County, Ilam Province, Iran. At the 2006 census, its population was 104, in 22 families. The village is populated by Arabs.
