= Karvansara, Khuzestan =

Karvansara كاروانسرا
- Village
- Location within Iran
- Coordinates: 31°33′29″N 49°12′55″E
- Country: Iran
- Province: Khuzestan
- County: Haftgel
- Bakhsh: Raghiveh
- Rural District: Gazin

Population (2006)
  - Total: 106
- Time zone: UTC+3:30 (IRST)
  - Summer (DST): UTC+4:30 (IRDT)

Karvansara (Persian: كاروانسرا, also Romanized as Kārvānsarā) is a village in Gazin Rural District, Raghiveh District, Haftgel County, Khuzestan Province, Iran. At the 2006 census, its population was 106, in 21 families.
