= Qantas Awards =

Qantas Awards can refer to:

- Qantas Television Awards
- Qantas Media Award
