= Daebul Industrial Complex =

Coordinates: 34°45′49″N 126°26′15″E

Daebul Industrial Complex (Korean: 대불국가산업단지) is an industrial complex which covers a large portion of Samho, Yeongam of South Jeolla province in South Korea. The complex was initially designed to set up fundamental base for development in the Mokpo area. Finalized in December 1996, the residence of enterprises start from 1997. The complex was initially aimed at the south east Asia and China market.

Disposals of the site plots had been quite difficult since its launch to start lease for foreigners since 2000 to rearrange supplies of LNG and infrastructure. Until 2001, portion of parcel stayed at 30% to confront serious complains by regional municipalities.

The establishment of Hyundai Samho Heavy Industries following purchase from Halla group greatly promoted the economical encouragement in local area, attracting businesses in similar or related industries. The connection from Seohaean expressway also increased the easier approach from Seoul via cars and also railroad via Mugunghwa-ho. The province also started advertisement to gain public gains through investment.

The region went through disadvantage via industrialization of South Korea, while shipbuilding industries has technically promoted further investment to boast local regional economy including Mokpo and south western coastal area. To settle down functional difficulties for foreign investors, the provincial office tackled down inquired matters from social infrastructure including expressway, gases, fundamental traffic map to license permissions.

In 2002, Ministry of Industries designated the Daebul area as a free trade region to attain additional support in national level to raise up the inter-related industries like shipbuilding and renewable energy provision. In Honam area, Daebul is supposed to co-operate that resided in Gunsan, Iksan and Gwangju.

Mokpo Customs also resides in this complex to inspect imported merchandise.
