= Karvansara, Urmia =

Karvansara كاروانسرا
- Village
- Location within Iran
- Coordinates: 37°23′45″N 45°08′10″E
- Country: Iran
- Province: West Azerbaijan
- County: Urmia
- Bakhsh: Central
- Rural District: Baranduzchay-ye Jonubi

Population (2006)
  - Total: 177
- Time zone: UTC+3:30 (IRST)
  - Summer (DST): UTC+4:30 (IRDT)

Karvansara (Persian: كاروانسرا, also Romanized as Kārvānsarā) is a village in Baranduzchay-ye Jonubi Rural District, in the Central District of Urmia County, West Azerbaijan Province, Iran. At the 2006 census, its population was 177, in 43 families.
