= Qanat, South Khorasan =

Qanat قنات
- Village
- Location within Iran
- Coordinates: 32°15′42″N 58°52′50″E
- Country: Iran
- Province: South Khorasan
- County: Khusf
- Bakhsh: Jolgeh-e Mazhan
- Rural District: Qaleh Zari

Population (2006)
  - Total: 22
- Time zone: UTC+3:30 (IRST)
  - Summer (DST): UTC+4:30 (IRDT)

Qanat (Persian: قنات, also Romanized as Qanāt and Ghanat) is a village in Qaleh Zari Rural District, Jolgeh-e Mazhan District, Khusf County, South Khorasan Province, Iran. At the 2006 census, its population was 22, in 8 families.
