= Quanta (journal) =

- Discipline: Quantum mechanics, mathematical physics, philosophy of science
- Language: English
- Edited by: Danko Georgiev

Publication details
- History: 2012-present
- Publisher: Danko Georgiev (Bulgaria)
- Frequency: Continuous
- Open access: Yes
- License: CC BY 3.0

Standard abbreviations
- ISO 4: Quanta

Indexing
- CODEN: QUANBI
- ISSN: 1314-7374
- OCLC no.: 891467829

Links
- Journal homepage; Online access; Online archive

Quanta is an open access scientific journal covering the foundations of quantum mechanics, mathematical physics, and philosophy of science. The first volume, dedicated to the work of Karl Popper on foundations of quantum mechanics, was published on November 15, 2012. The editor-in-chief and publisher is Danko Georgiev (Institute for Advanced Study, Varna, Bulgaria).

== Abstracting and indexing ==
The journal is abstracted and indexed in:

- Chemical Abstracts Service
- MathSciNet
- Scopus
- zbMATH Open
