= Muan County =

County in Jeonnam-Gwangju, South Korea

Coordinates: 34°59′23″N 126°28′17″E

Muan
- County
- Muan International Airport

- Flag Emblem of Muan

- Location in South Korea
- Country: South Korea
- Region: Honam
- Provincial-level city: Jeonnam-Gwangju
- Administrative divisions: 3 eup, 6 myeon

Area
  - Total: 436.4 km^{2} (168.5 sq mi)

Population (September 2024)
  - Total: 92,009
  - Density: 173.5/km^{2} (449/sq mi)
  - Dialect: Jeolla
- Area codes: +82-61-2xx,450~459
- Bird: Egret
- Flower: Chrysanthemum
- Tree: Zelkova
- Website: muan.go.kr

Korean name
- Hangul: 무안군
- Hanja: 務安郡
- RR: Muan-gun
- MR: Muan-gun

Muan County (Korean: 무안군) is a county in Jeonnam-Gwangju, South Korea. In 2005, Muan County became the capital of the former South Jeolla following the transfer of the provincial office from its previous location in Gwangju to the village of Namak in Muan. Muan International Airport was opened here and will eventually replace the airport in Gwangju (it already replaced Mokpo Airport).

== Modern history ==
On 1 January 1963, several villages (ri in Korean) were incorporated into Mokpo city and huge reorganization was made by the South Korean government. In 1979, Muan township was promoted to a township (eup of South Korea). In 1980, Illo was also promoted into a township.

On 29 December 2024, a Jeju Air Boeing 737–800 passenger aircraft operating as Flight 2216 overshot the runway at Muan International Airport and crashed into a barrier. Out of the 181 occupants, 179 people (all 175 passengers and 4 of 6 crew members) were confirmed to have been killed and at least two were injured in the worst aviation accident to have occurred on South Korean soil.

== Administrative divisions ==
Muan County administers three towns (eup) and six townships (myeon).

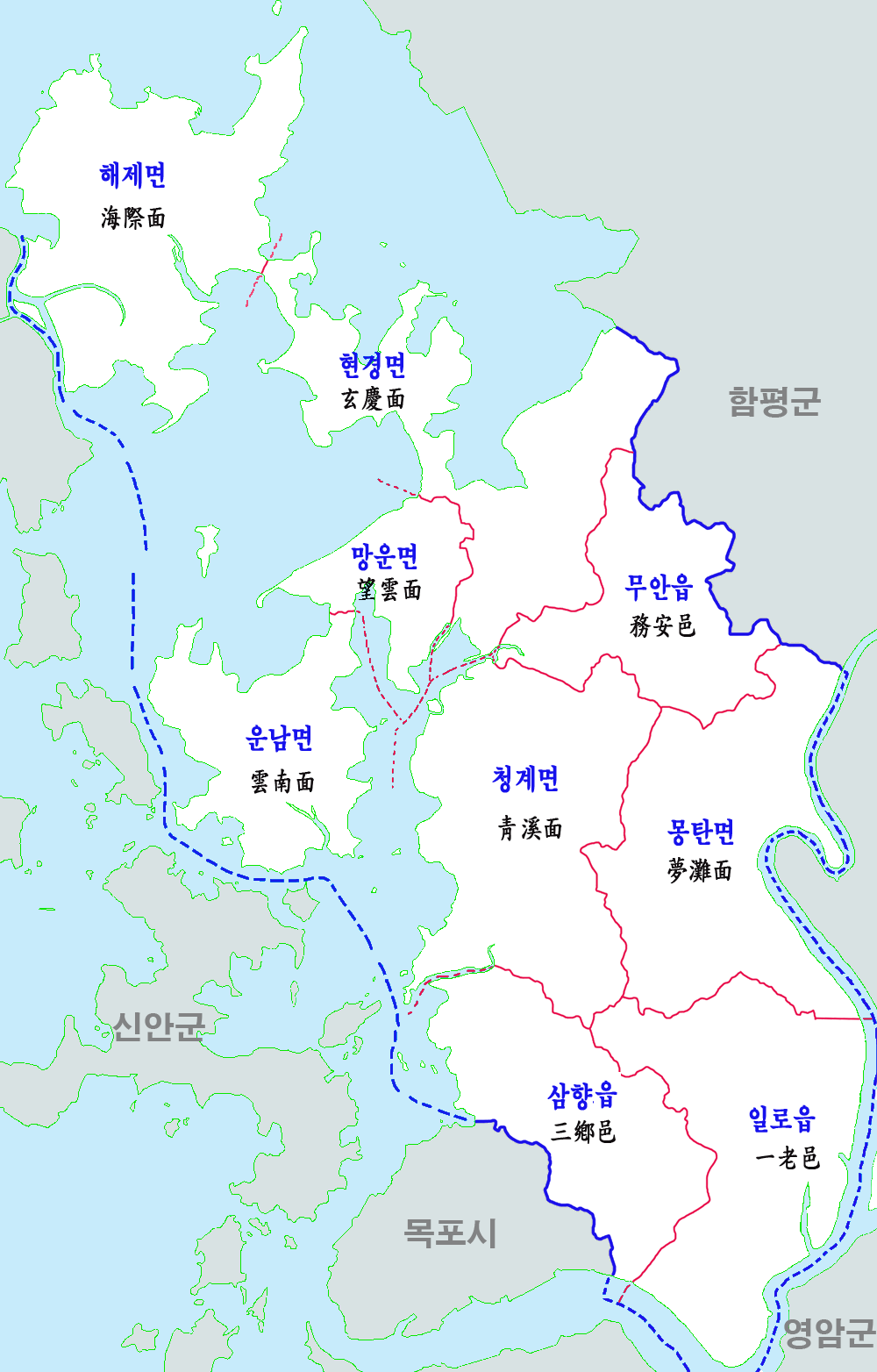
Map of Muan-gun

Name	Hangul	Hanja	Area (km^{2})	Population (2024-12)	Households
Muan-eup	무안읍	務安邑	35.67	10,776	5,651
Illo-eup	일로읍	一老邑	67.05	21,135	8,504
Samhyang-eup	삼향읍	三鄕邑	45.16	38,338	16,826
Mongtan-myeon	몽탄면	夢灘面	63.1	2,765	1,751
Cheonggye-myeon	청계면	淸溪面	57.8	6,319	3,895
Hyeongyeong-myeon	현경면	玄慶面	55.35	4,306	2,681
Mangun-myeon	망운면	望雲面	19.12	1,795	1,113
Haeje-myeon	해제면	海際面	64.48	4,528	2,791
Unnam-myeon	운남면	雲南面	34.93	2,725	1,656

Namak-ri, where the provincial government of South Jeolla is located, is in Samhyang-eup.

== Location ==
Muan County is located on the western tip of the southwestern part of the Korean peninsula. It acts as the primary link between Sinan County with the rest of the Korean mainland. Numerous beaches are also found on Muan's coast.

Muan borders Yeongsan River with Naju and Hampyeong to the north, Yeongam to the east, Mokpo to the south. These surroundings have influenced the industrial and cultural structure of Muan County.

== Enterprise city ==
Muan was designated an enterprise city by the South Korean government for the Honam region (Southwest). The South Korean government and China have agreed to develop an industrial complex in a joint venture. It was reported that the Chinese government officially promised to invest in and help establish the complex area, which includes the construction of a college and distribution warehouses among other things such as a Chinatown for expatriates.

== Mud ==
Muan includes a large area of mudlands. The western area of the Korean peninsula has a large amount of mud thanks to the Rias coast. However, many mudlands have been destroyed or reclaimed for expanding city areas or industrial complexes.

The mudlands of Muan were designated one of the wetlands of the Ramsar Convention.

In the Muan mudflats, tourists cannot enter the sea without permission to protect the mudflats. But tourists can see the road that opens like the "Miracle of Moses" to reveal its face when the tide falls twice a day.

== Festival ==
Muan is widely known for its White Lotus Festival (무안연꽃축제) located in Illo-eup. The festival occurs in mid-August when the white lotus flowers bloom fully onsite at the Hoesan White Lotus Pond (회산 백련지). Tourists can walk into the huge lotuslands via the many bridges that crisscross the water. Visitors may also ride the 'duck boats.'

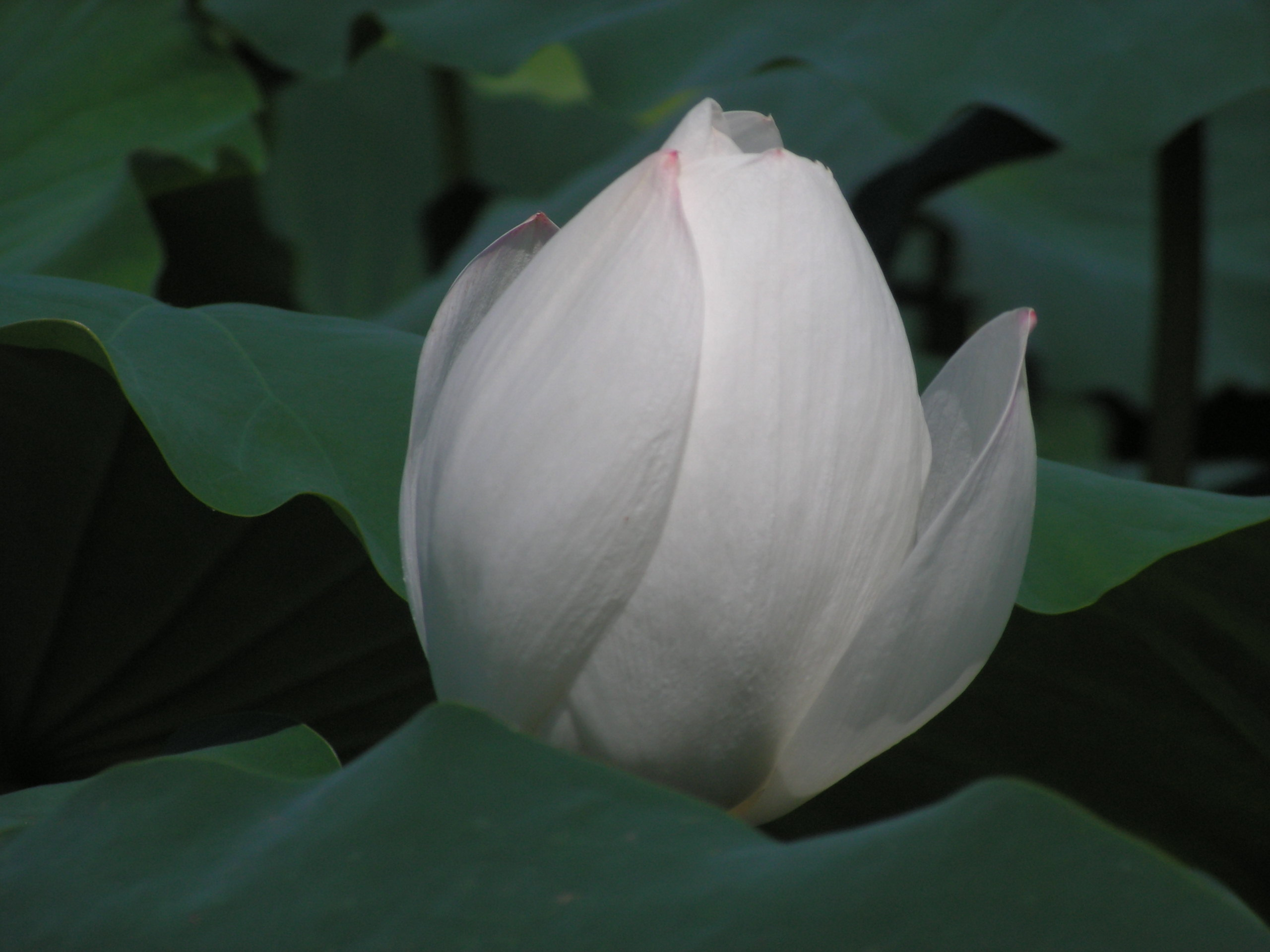
White Lotus Blossom

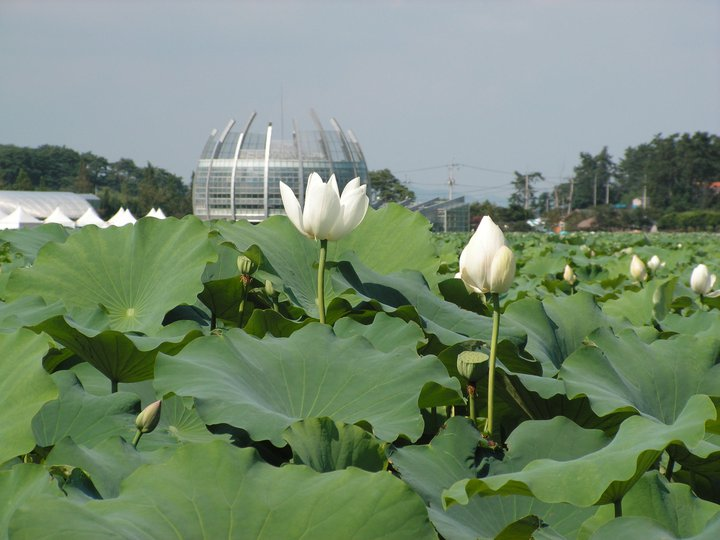
Lake in Muan with a Lotus-shaped building.

== Products ==
Muan is known for several famous products characteristic of the area. They are largely farming goods from onions to lotus products. Muan puts out 16% of the national onion production making its production volume the largest in Korea.

Muan county officially reported to host farming cluster of sweet potato, onion and lotus plants. The powder of lotus plants is used for making noodles.

== Education ==
Muan County is the site of Mokpo National University, situated in Cheonggye township.

== Transportation ==
=== Expressway ===
- Seohaean Expressway
- Namhae Expressway
- Muan–Gwangju Expressway

=== National Route ===
- National Route 1
- National Route 2
- National Route 24
- National Route 77

=== Railway ===
- Honam Line

=== Airport ===
- Muan International Airport

== Sister cities ==
- Uiryeong, South Gyeongsang
- Gunpo, Gyeonggi
- Dobong-gu, Seoul
- Taizhou, Zhejiang, China
- Kitanagoya, Aichi, Japan
- Denizli, Turkey
