= Chaqabol, Selseleh =

Chaqabol چقابل
- Village
- Location within Iran
- Coordinates: 33°51′27″N 48°13′29″E
- Country: Iran
- Province: Lorestan
- County: Selseleh
- Bakhsh: Central
- Rural District: Doab

Population (2006)
  - Total: 26
- Time zone: UTC+3:30 (IRST)
  - Summer (DST): UTC+4:30 (IRDT)

Chaqabol (Persian: چقابل, also Romanized as Chaqābol and Choghābal) is a village in Doab Rural District, in the Central District of Selseleh County, Lorestan Province, Iran. At the 2006 census, its population was 26, in 5 families.
