= Kasian, Chaypareh =

Kasian كسيان
- Village
- Location within Iran
- Coordinates: 38°53′37″N 44°59′07″E
- Country: Iran
- Province: West Azerbaijan
- County: Chaypareh
- Bakhsh: Central
- Rural District: Bastam

Population (2006)
  - Total: 279
- Time zone: UTC+3:30 (IRST)
  - Summer (DST): UTC+4:30 (IRDT)

Kasian (Persian: كسيان, also Romanized as Kasīān) is a village in Bastam Rural District, in the Central District of Chaypareh County, West Azerbaijan Province, Iran. At the 2006 census, its population was 279, in 69 families.
