= Karvansara, Gegharkunik =

Karvansara
- Location within Armenia Location within Gegharkunik
- Coordinates: 40°02′34″N 45°14′38″E
- Country: Armenia
- Marz (Province): Gegharkunik
- Time zone: UTC+4 ( )
  - Summer (DST): UTC+5 ( )

Karvansara is a town in the Gegharkunik Province of Armenia. The name derives from caravanserai (Turkish for "inn").

== See also ==
- Gegharkunik Province
