= Qanat-e Sur =

Qanat-e Sur قنات سور
- Village
- Location within Iran
- Coordinates: 30°15′12″N 51°55′12″E
- Country: Iran
- Province: Fars
- County: Sepidan
- Bakhsh: Central
- Rural District: Khafri

Population (2006)
  - Total: 60
- Time zone: UTC+3:30 (IRST)
  - Summer (DST): UTC+4:30 (IRDT)

Qanat-e Sur (Persian: قنات سور, also Romanized as Qanāt-e Sūr; also known as Qanā and Qanāt) is a village in Khafri Rural District, in the Central District of Sepidan County, Fars province, Iran. At the 2006 census, its population was 60, in 15 families.
