= South Jeolla Province =

Former province of South Korea

- Province
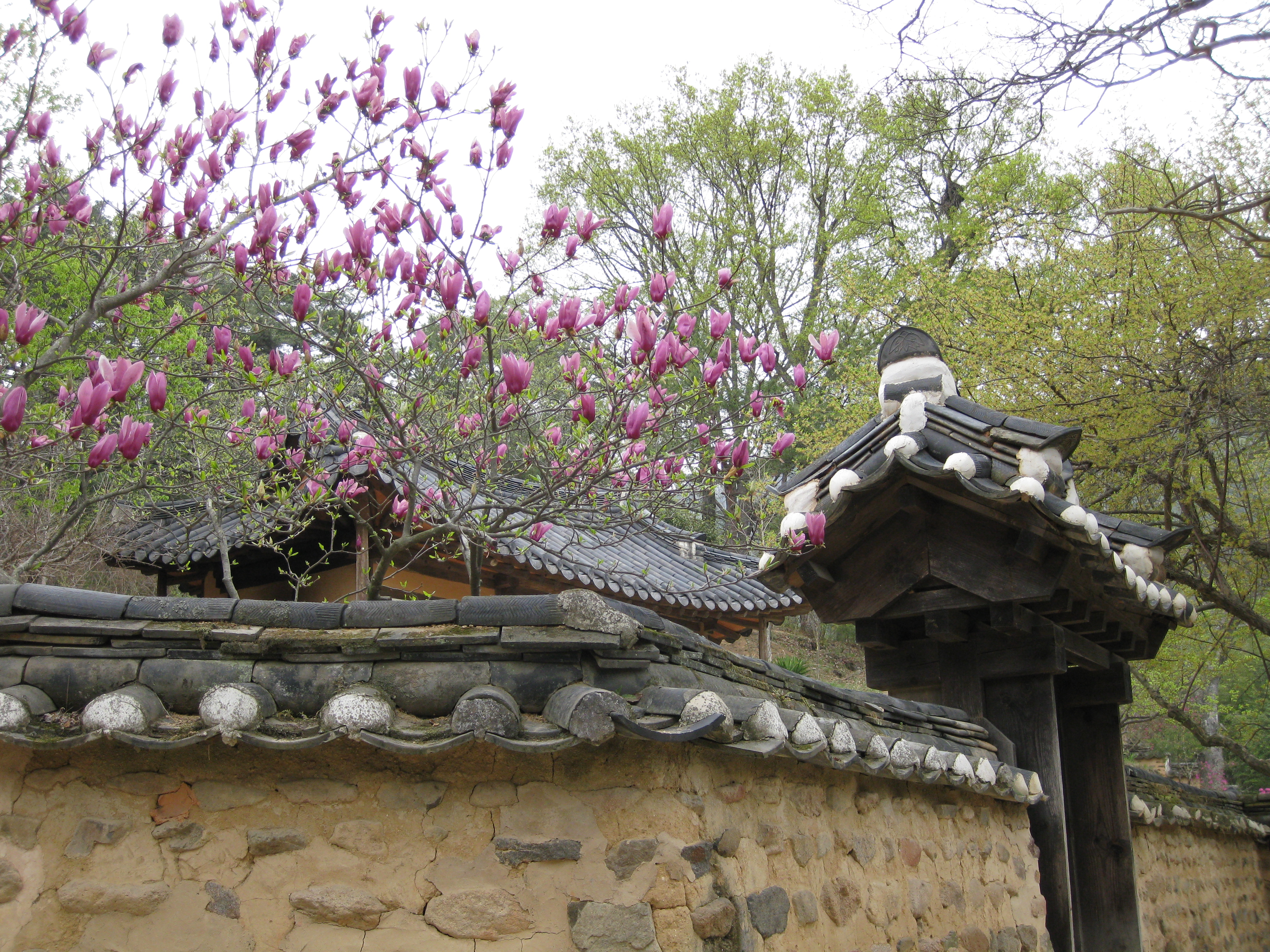
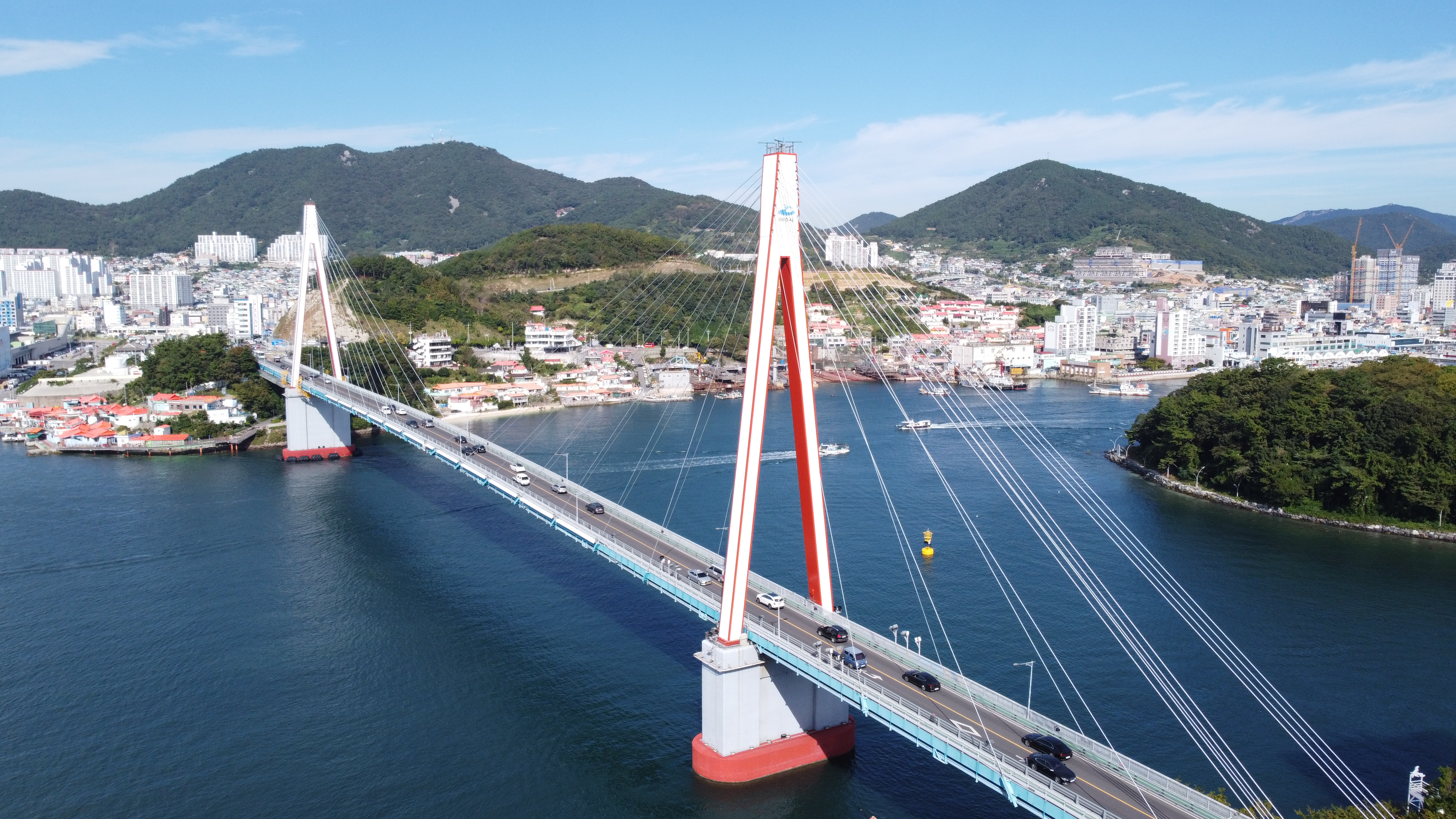
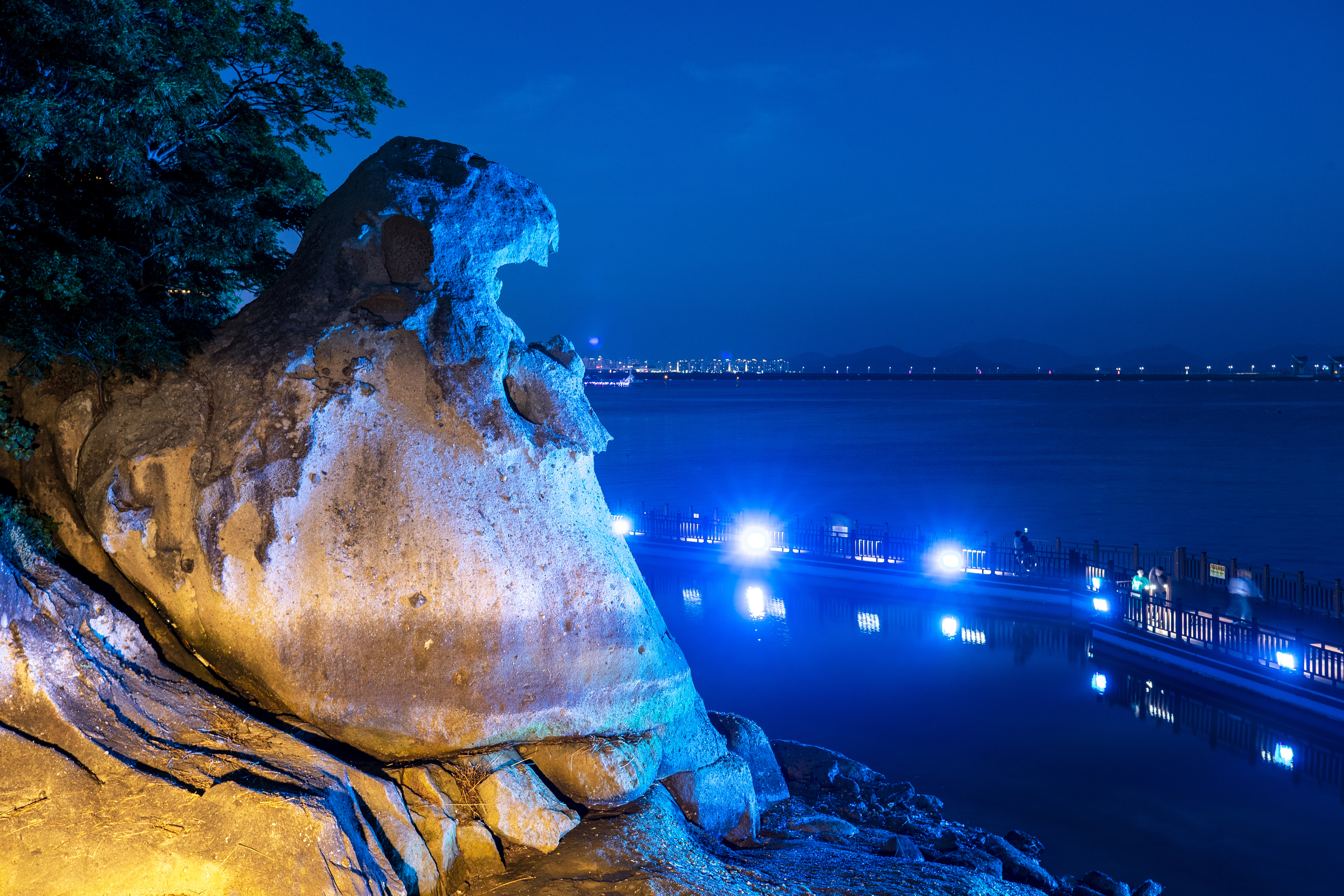
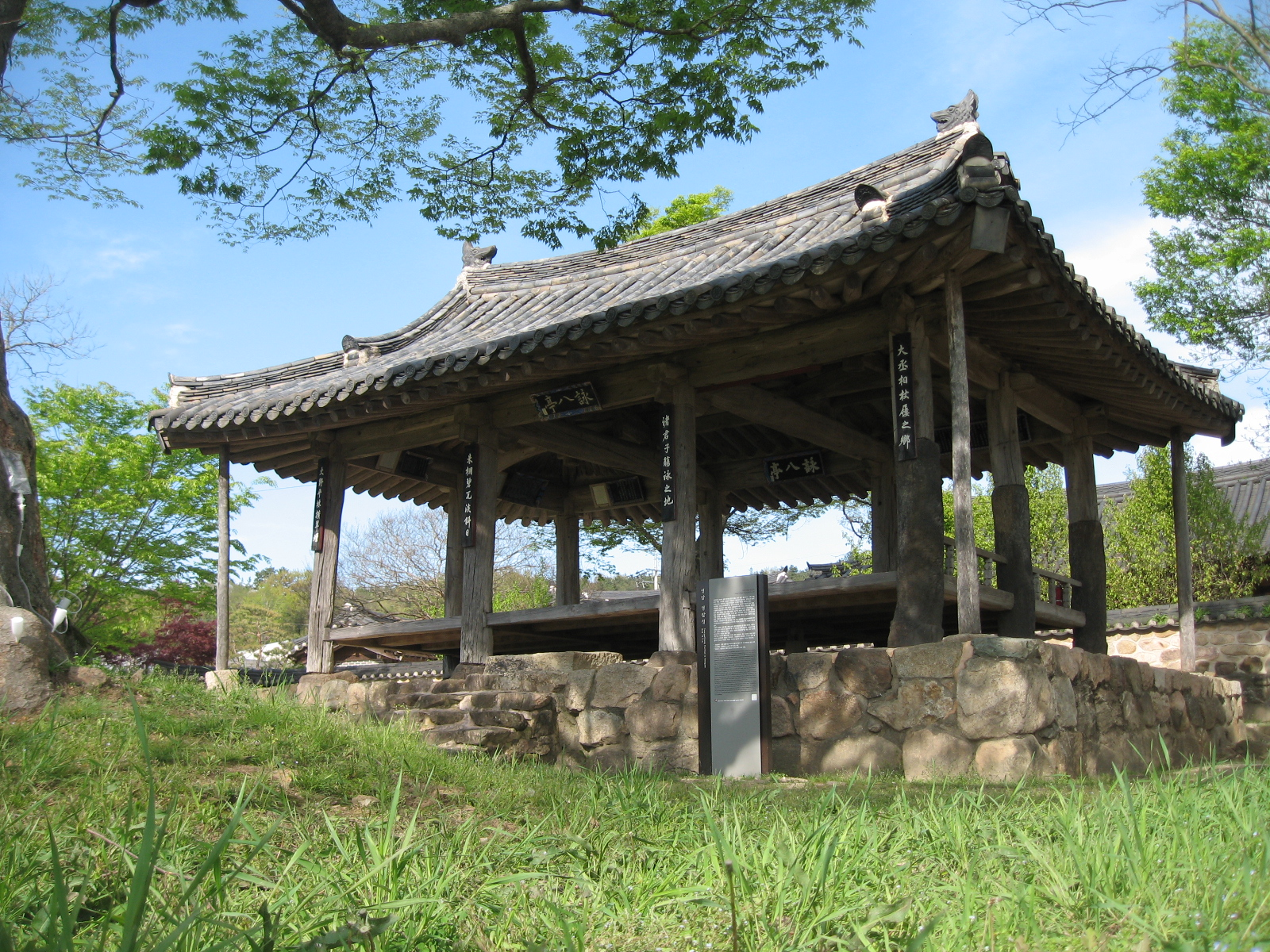
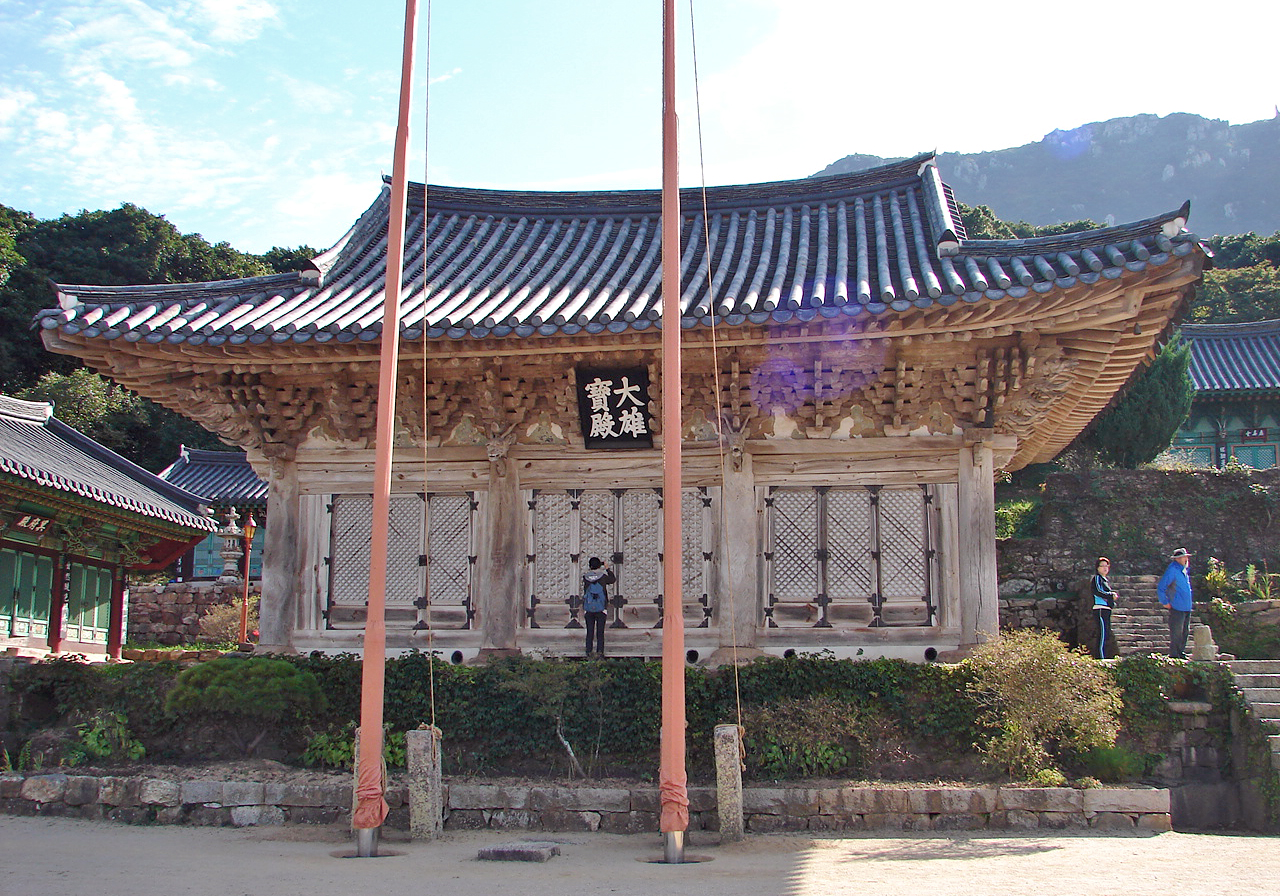
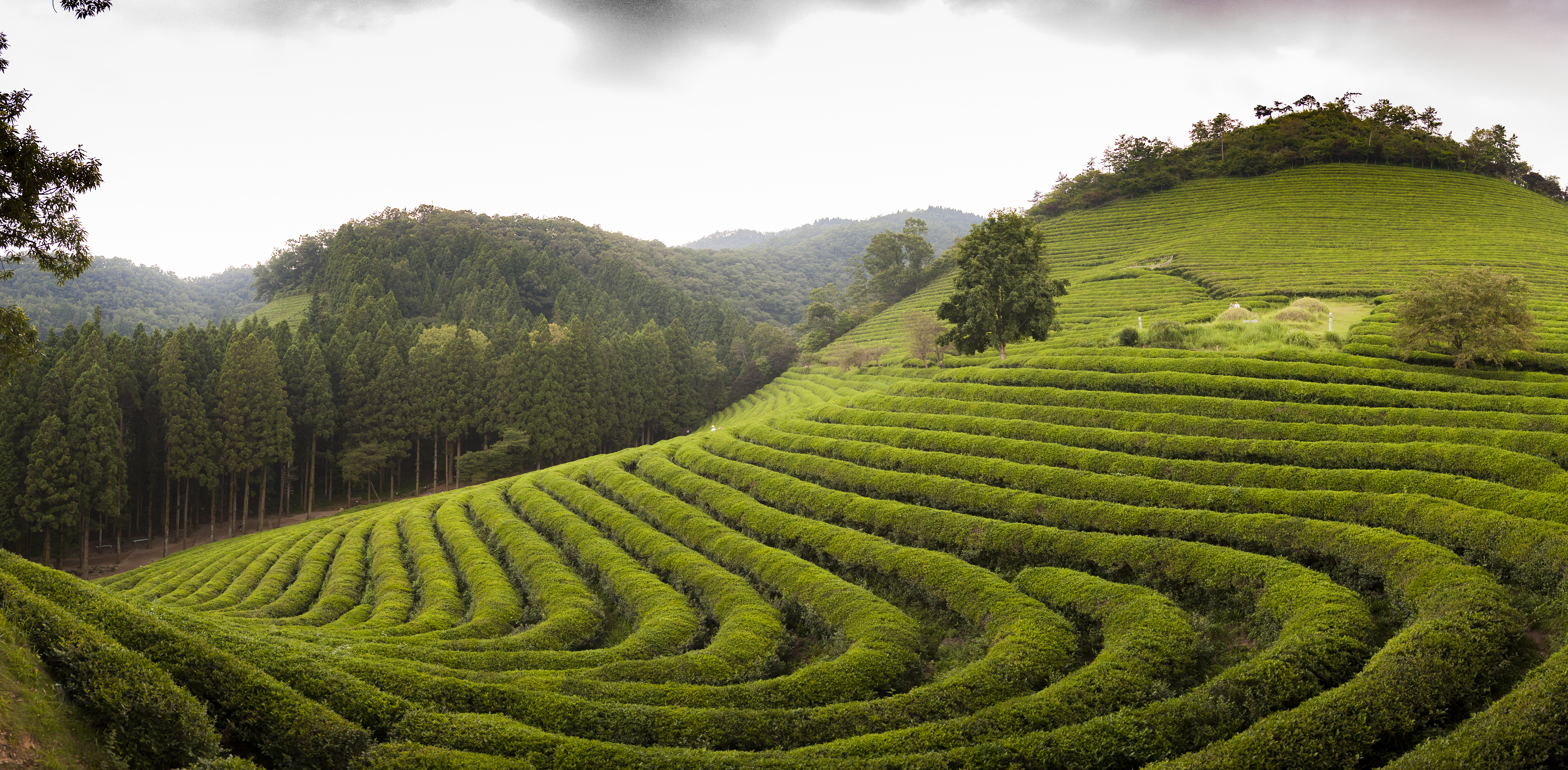
- From the left: Damyang, Yeosu, Mokpo, Yeongam, Haenam, Boseong

- Flag Logo

- Coordinates: 34°45′N 127°0′E
- Country: South Korea
- Region: Honam
- Largest city: Suncheon
- Capital: Muan County
- Subdivisions: 5 cities; 17 counties

Government
  - Governor: Kim Yung-rok (D)

Area
  - Total: 12,335.13 km^{2} (4,762.62 sq mi)
  - Rank: 3rd

Population (October 2014)
  - Total: 1,817,697
  - Rank: 6th
  - Density: 147.36/km^{2} (381.7/sq mi)

Provincial symbols
  - Flower: Camellia japonica
  - Tree: Ginkgo
  - Bird: Oriental turtle dove

GDP (Nominal, 2023)
  - Total: KRW 98 trillion (US$ 78 billion)
  - Per capita: US$ 51,422
- ISO 3166 code: KR-46
- Dialect: Jeolla
- Website: Official website (English)

Korean name
- Hangul: 전라남도
- Hanja: 全羅南道
- RR: Jeollanam-do
- MR: Chŏllanam-do

South Jeolla Province (Korean: 전라남도), name sometimes rendered as Jeollanam-do, (Note: Formerly romanized South Chŏlla Province and sometimes abbreviated in Korean as Jeonnam (전남).) was a province in the Honam region, South Korea. It used to be the southernmost province in mainland Korea. It was made defunct on July 1, 2026. Its former territory has been combined with the former city of Gwangju into a new "special metropolitan city" called Jeonnam-Gwangju or "Gwangju" for short.

South Jeolla bordered the provinces of North Jeolla to the north, South Gyeongsang to the northeast, and Jeju to the southwest in the Korea Strait.

Suncheon is the largest city in the region, closely followed by Yeosu. Other major cities include Mokpo, Gwangyang and Naju.

Jeolla-do, including both North and South Jeolla, was the first province out of the Eight Provinces system to have its 1000th year anniversary in 2018, as the name 'Jeolla-do' was established in 1018, during Hyeonjong of Goryeo's 9th year in power.

== History ==
=== Proto Three Kingdoms period ===
During the Samhan period, South Jeolla belonged to Mahan (마한; 馬韓)

=== Three Kingdoms period ===
In the Three Kingdoms period, it belonged to Gujihakseong (구지하성; 久知下城) of the southern five regions of Baekje (백제; 百濟), with Mujinju (무진주; 武珍州) as its center.

=== Unified Silla, North and South period ===
During the Unified Silla period, with the establishment of nine provinces and five subordinate regions, the area remained under Mujinju. In the 16th year of King Gyeongdeok's reign (757), Mujinju was renamed to Muju (무주; 武州) and came to oversee 15 counties (군; 郡) and 43 prefectures (군; 縣).

=== Goryeo dynasty ===
In the 2nd year of King Seongjong of Goryeo (983), when the national administrative divisions were reorganized into twelve mok (목), Naju-mok and Seungju-mok were established. In the 14th year of King Seongjong's reign (995), with the implementation of the province (도) system, the nation was divided into ten provinces(도), and the region was called Haeyangdo (해향도; 海陽道). In the 9th year of King Hyeonjong's reign, Haeyangdo was merged with Gangnamdo, and the name Jeollado (全羅道) was officially adopted.

=== Joseon dynasty ===
During the Joseon Dynasty, the country was divided into eight provinces, and names such as Gwangnamdo (光南道), Jeongwangdo (全光道), and Jeonnamdo (全南道) were occasionally used. However, the name Jeollado was predominantly maintained.

On May 26, 1895 (the 32nd year of King Gojong's reign), with the implementation of the 23-bu system, Jeollado was subdivided into Jeonju-bu (全州府), Namwon-bu (南原府), Naju-bu (羅州府), and Jeju-bu (濟州府). Currently, seven cities and counties, including Suncheon and Damyang, belong to Namwon-bu, and Yeonggwang and Jangseong is part of Jeonju-bu, and the remaining sixteen cities and counties belong to Naju-bu.

On August 4, 1896 (the 33rd year of King Gojong's reign), Decree No. 36 abolished the 23-bu system. During the reorganization process, the existing eight provinces were divided into thirteen provinces by splitting five provinces (Jeollado, Chungcheongdo, Gyeongsangdo, etc.) into northern and southern regions. As a result, Jeollado was split into north and south, with the southern part being renamed Jeollanam-do (전라남도),or South Jeolla Province, as it is known today, encompassing 1 moks(목/牧) and 32 counties (군/gun).

== Geography ==
The region part of the Honam region, and is bounded on the west by the Yellow Sea, on the north by Jeollabuk-do Province, on the south by Jeju Strait, and on the east by Gyeongsangnam-do.

There are almost 2,000 islands along the coastline, about three quarters of which are uninhabited. The coastline is about 6,100 kilometres (3,800 mi) long. Some of the marine products, in particular oyster and seaweed cultivation, are leading in South Korea.

The region is only partially mountainous. The plains along the rivers Seomjin, Yeongsan and Tamjin are suitable for large-scale grain agriculture. There is abundant rainfall in the area, which helps agriculture. The region also home to the warmest weather on the peninsula. This helped in the production of large amounts of agricultural produce, mainly rice, wheat, barley, pulses and potatoes. Vegetables, cotton and fruits which were also grown in the province.

=== Environment ===
A small amount of gold and coal is mined in the region, but industries have also been developed in the area. The amount of harmful heavy metals in the region is one-thirtieth of the environmental standard requirement, boasting clean air.

== Demographics ==
Historical population
Year	Pop.	±%
1970	3,438,906	—
1980	3,052,136	−11.2%
1990	2,507,439	−17.8%
2000	1,996,456	−20.4%
2010	1,741,499	−12.8%
2020	1,788,807	+2.7%

Age Distribution (2020)
Age	Population
90+ years	14,883
80–89 years	103,290
70–79 years	184,866
60–69 years	257,648
50–59 years	298,881
40–49 years	252,465
30–39 years	191,379
20–29 years	194,394
10–19 years	159,118
0–9 years	131,883

- Source: SOUTH KOREA: South Jeolla Province – Further information about the population structure
  (CITY POPULATION)
Religion in South Jeolla Province (2024)
1. Not religious (50.0%)
2. Buddhism (11.0%)
3. Protestantism (25.0%)
4. Catholicism (11.0%)
5. Others (3.00%)

== Administrative divisions ==
South Jeolla Province was divided into 5 cities (si) and 17 counties (gun). Listed below is the name of each entity in English, hangul, and hanja.

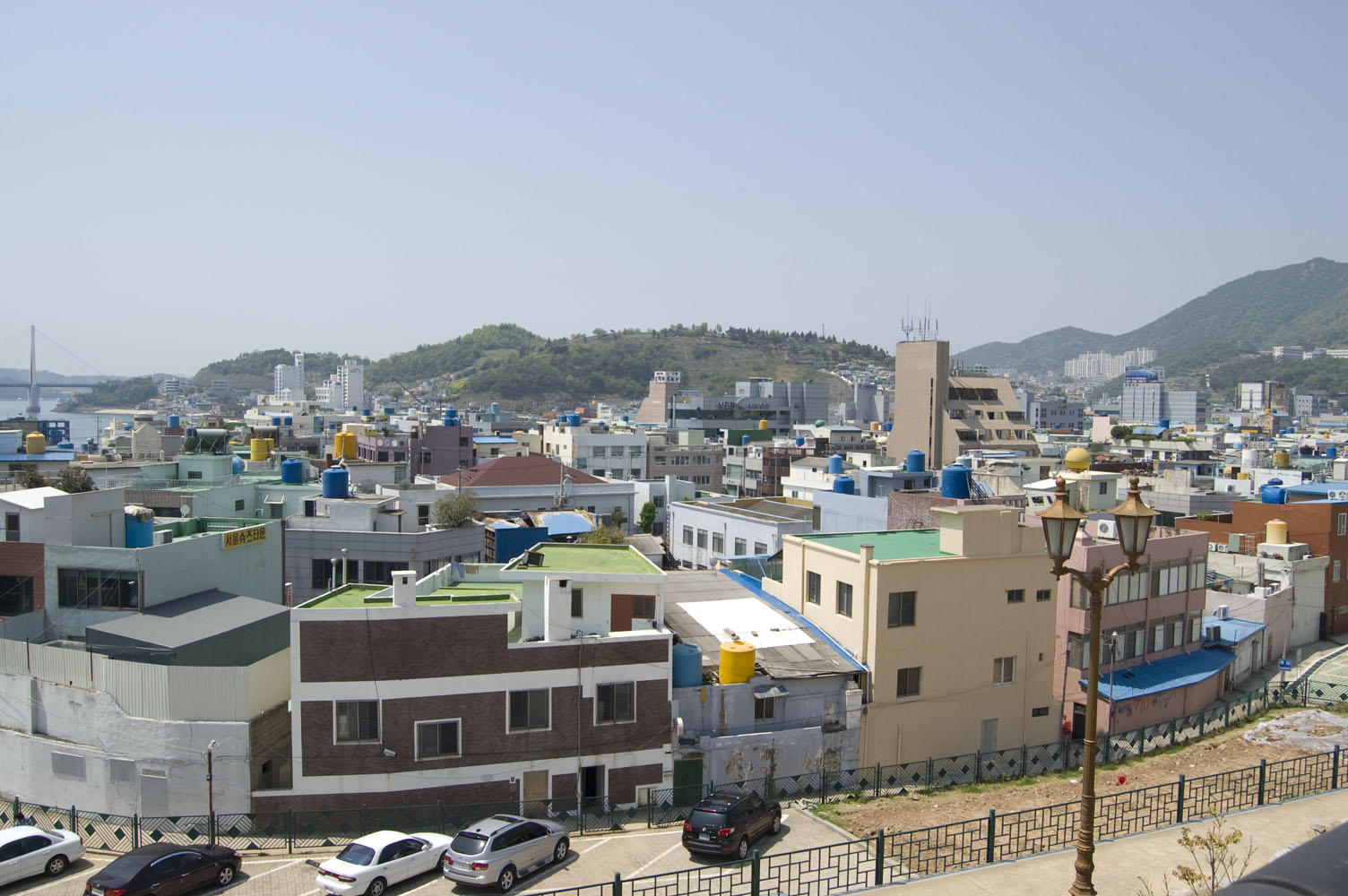
Yeosu

Map	Name	Hangul	Hanja	Population (2024)	Area (km^{2})	Population density 2021 (per km^{2})	Subdivisions
Yeosu	Yeosu	여수시	麗水市	268,823	510.08 km2	526.75/km^{2}	1 eup, 6 myeon, 20 haengjeong-dong
Mokpo	Mokpo	목포시	木浦市	210,806	51.58 km2	4,288.06/km^{2}	23 haengjeong-dong
Suncheon	Suncheon	순천시	順天市	276,375	907.43 km2	301.76/km^{2}	1 eup, 10 myeon, 13 haengjeong-dong
Gwangyang	Gwangyang	광양시	光陽市	154,226	458.89 km2	314.29/km^{2}	1 eup, 6 myeon, 5 haengjeong-dong
Naju	Naju	나주시	羅州市	116,891	608.45 km2	189.23/km^{2}	1 eup, 12 myeon, 7 haengjeong-dong
Muan County	Muan County	무안군	務安郡	92,009	448.95 km2	200.68/km^{2}	3 eup, 6 myeon
Haenam County	Haenam County	해남군	海南郡	63,457	1,013.8 km2	62.38/km^{2}	1 eup, 13 myeon
Goheung County	Goheung County	고흥군	高興郡	60,385	807.23 km2	72.93/km^{2}	2 eup, 14 myeon
Hwasun County	Hwasun County	화순군	和順郡	60,886	786.9 km2	76.42/km^{2}	1 eup, 12 myeon
Yeongam County	Yeongam County	영암군	靈巖郡	55,998	604.24 km2	92.68/km^{2}	2 eup, 9 myeon
Yeonggwang County	Yeonggwang County	영광군	靈光郡	48,981	473.69 km2	103.40/km^{2}	3 eup, 8 myeon
Wando County	Wando County	완도군	莞島郡	47,210	396.13 km2	119.18/km^{2}	3 eup, 9 myeon
Damyang County	Damyang County	담양군	潭陽郡	44,034	455.12 km2	96.75/km^{2}	1 eup, 11 myeon
Boseong County	Boseong County	보성군	寶城郡	36,981	663.35 km2	55.75/km^{2}	2 eup, 10 myeon
Jangseong County	Jangseong County	장성군	長城郡	40,604	518.65 km2	78.29/km^{2}	1 eup, 10 myeon
Jangheung County	Jangheung County	장흥군	長興郡	34,268	618.2 km2	55.43/km^{2}	3 eup, 7 myeon
Gangjin County	Gangjin County	강진군	康津郡	31,941	500.28 km2	63.85/km^{2}	1 eup, 10 myeon
Sinan County	Sinan County	신안군	新安郡	34,000	663.59 km2	51.24/km^{2}	2 eup, 12 myeon
Hampyeong County	Hampyeong County	함평군	咸平郡	29,369	392.43 km2	74.84/km^{2}	1 eup, 8 myeon
Jindo County	Jindo County	진도군	珍島郡	29,013	440.1 km2	65.92/km^{2}	1 eup, 6 myeon
Gokseong County	Gokseong County	곡성군	谷城郡	26,781	547.44 km2	48.92/km^{2}	1 eup, 10 myeon
Gurye County	Gurye County	구례군	求禮郡	23,543	443.2 km2	53.12/km^{2}	1 eup, 7 myeon

== Sister cities and provinces ==
- State of Arizona, United States
- State of Maryland, United States
- Gyeongsan, South Korea
- Ipswich, Queensland, Australia
- Bà Rịa–Vũng Tàu province, Vietnam
- Bình Phước province, Vietnam
- State of Oregon, United States
- Sichuan Province, China
- Alcochete, Portugal

== Religion ==
Religion in South Jeolla (2005)
1. Not religious (53.4%)
2. Protestantism (21.8%)
3. Buddhism (16.1%)
4. Catholicism (8.70%)

According to the census of 2005, of the people of South Jeolla 30.5% followed Christianity (21.8% Protestantism and 8.7% Catholicism) and 16.1% followed Buddhism. 53.4% of the population was mostly not religious or followed Muism and other indigenous religions.

== Education ==
=== National universities with graduate schools ===
- Chonnam National University - Yeosu Campus
- Mokpo National Maritime University – Mokpo
- Mokpo National University - Mokpo/Muan County/Yeongam County
- Sunchon National University – Suncheon

=== Private universities with graduate schools ===
- Dongshin University – Naju
- Gwangju Catholic University – Naju
- Mokpo Catholic University – Mokpo
- Sehan University - Yeongam County Campus
- Youngsan Won Buddhist University – Yeonggwang County
- Chodang University – Muan County
- Hanlyo University – Gwangyang

=== Public institutes of higher education ===
- Jeonnam Provincial College – Damyang County/Jangheung County

=== Private institutes of higher education ===
- Chunnam Techno University – Gokseong County
- Dong-A College – Yeongam County
- Hanyeong College – Yeosu
- Koguryeo College - Naju
- Kwangyang Health College – Gwangyang
- Mokpo Science University – Mokpo
- Suncheon First College – Suncheon
- Suncheon Cheongam College – Suncheon

== Governor ==
- 31st: Heo Kyung-man (July 1, 1995 – July 1, 1998) – 1st term
- 32nd: Heo Kyung-man (July 1, 1998 – July 1, 2002) – 2nd term
- 33rd: Park Tae-young (July 1, 2002 – April 29, 2004) – 1st term
- 34th: Park Jun-young (June 6, 2004 – July 1, 2006) – 1st term
- 35th: Park Jun-young (July 1, 2006 – July 1, 2010) – 2nd term
- 36th: Park Jun-young (July 1, 2010 – July 1, 2014) – 3rd term
- 37th: Lee Nak-yeon (July 1, 2014 – May 12, 2018)
- 38th: Kim Yung-rok (July 1, 2018 – June 30, 2026)

== Economy ==
Gwangyang Steel Mill, one of the world's largest single steel producer with an annual capacity of 21 million tons, was located in the city of Gwangyang. In addition, Yeosu National Industrial Complex, the nation's largest petrochemical industrial complex, was located in Yeosu City.

In February 2025, South Korea announced plans for a $35 billion data center for artificial intelligence applications with a 3GW capacity to be built in the South Jeolla. An agreement was made to ensure the data center has access to energy, water, and other essential resources.

== Transportation ==
=== Rail ===
- KTX Honam Line: Seoul station to GwangjuSongjeong station
- KTX Honam Line: Seoul station to Mokpo station

=== Roads ===
- Expressway No.10
- Expressway No.15

=== Airports ===
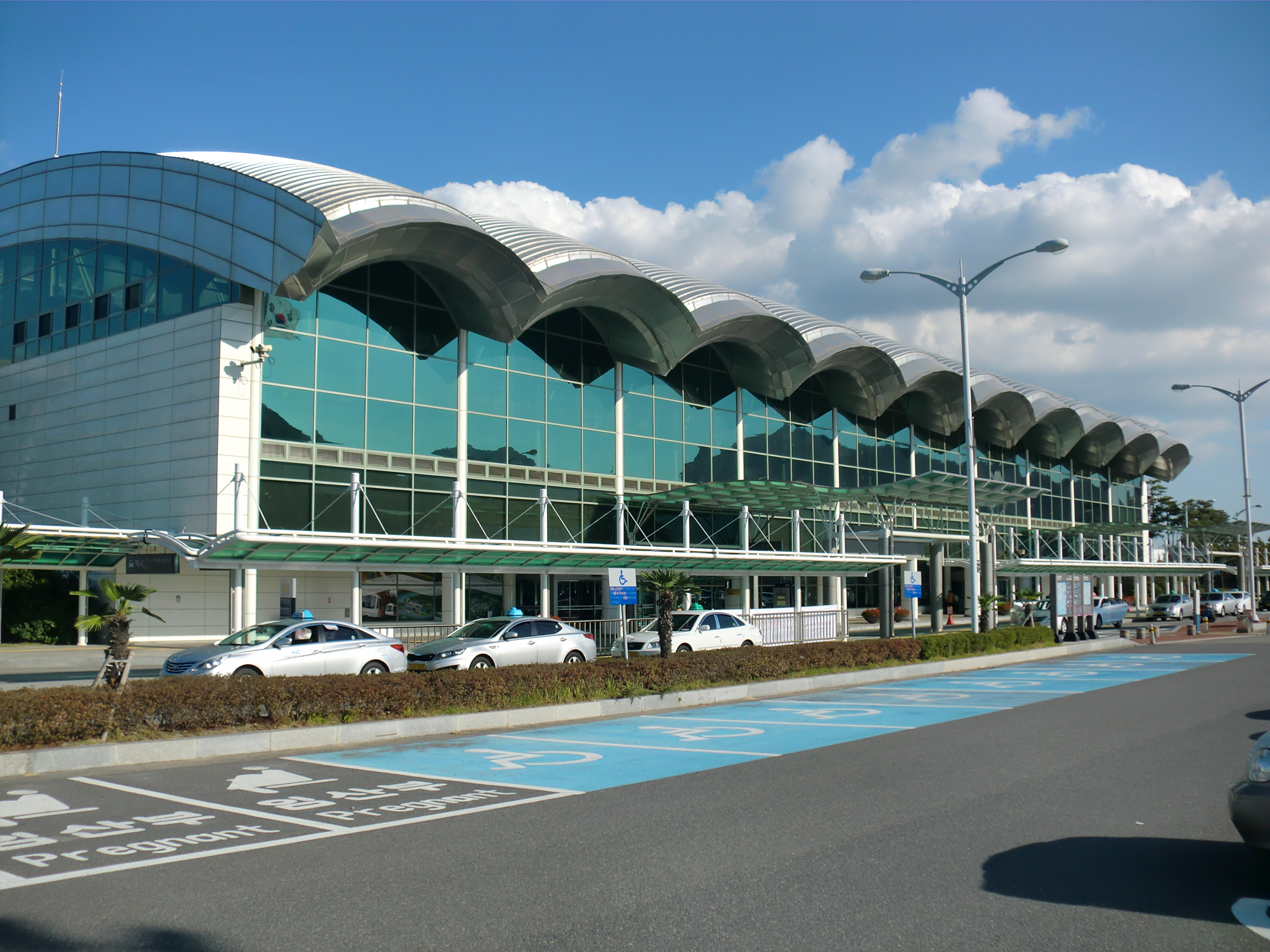
Yeosu Airport in Yeosu

- Muan International Airport
- Yeosu Airport
- Gwangju Airport

== Tourism ==
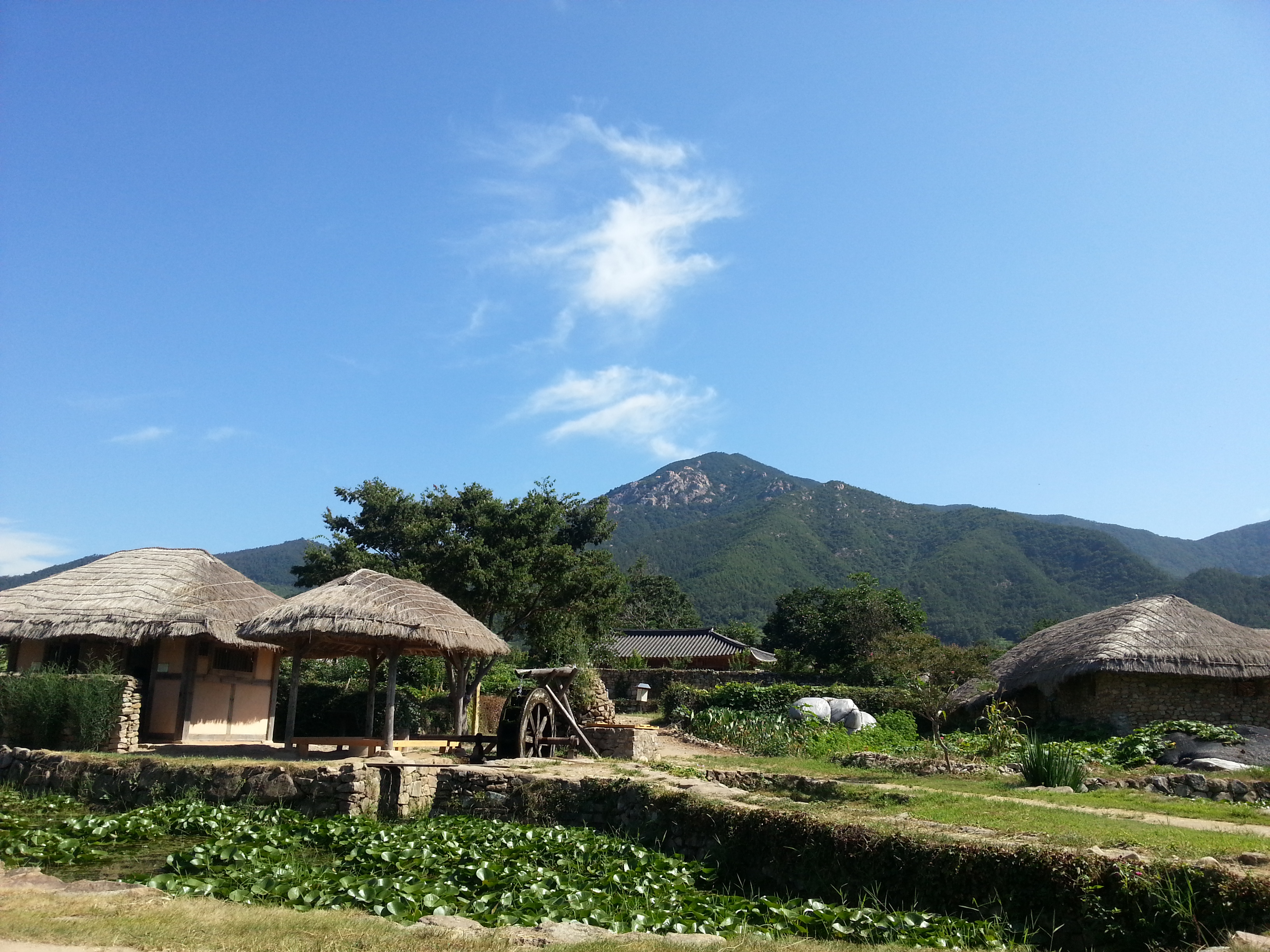
Nagan Eupseong Folk Village in Suncheon

- Yeosu – Jinnamgwan Hall, Hyangiram, Yi Sun Shin Square
- Suncheon – Songgwangsa Temple, Seonamsa Temple, Nagan Eupseong Folk Village
- Mokpo – Mokpo Modern History Museum, Gatbawi Rock, Yudal Mountain
- Haenam – Ttanggut (End of the Land) Village, Mihwangsa Temple
- Gurye – Hwaeomsa Temple
- Damyang – Damyang Juknokwon, Metasequoia-lined Road, Soswaewon Garden
- Boseong – Boseong Green Tea Field Daehan Dawon
- Dochodo – Seonggaksa
Tourism

Art Gallery in Yeosu

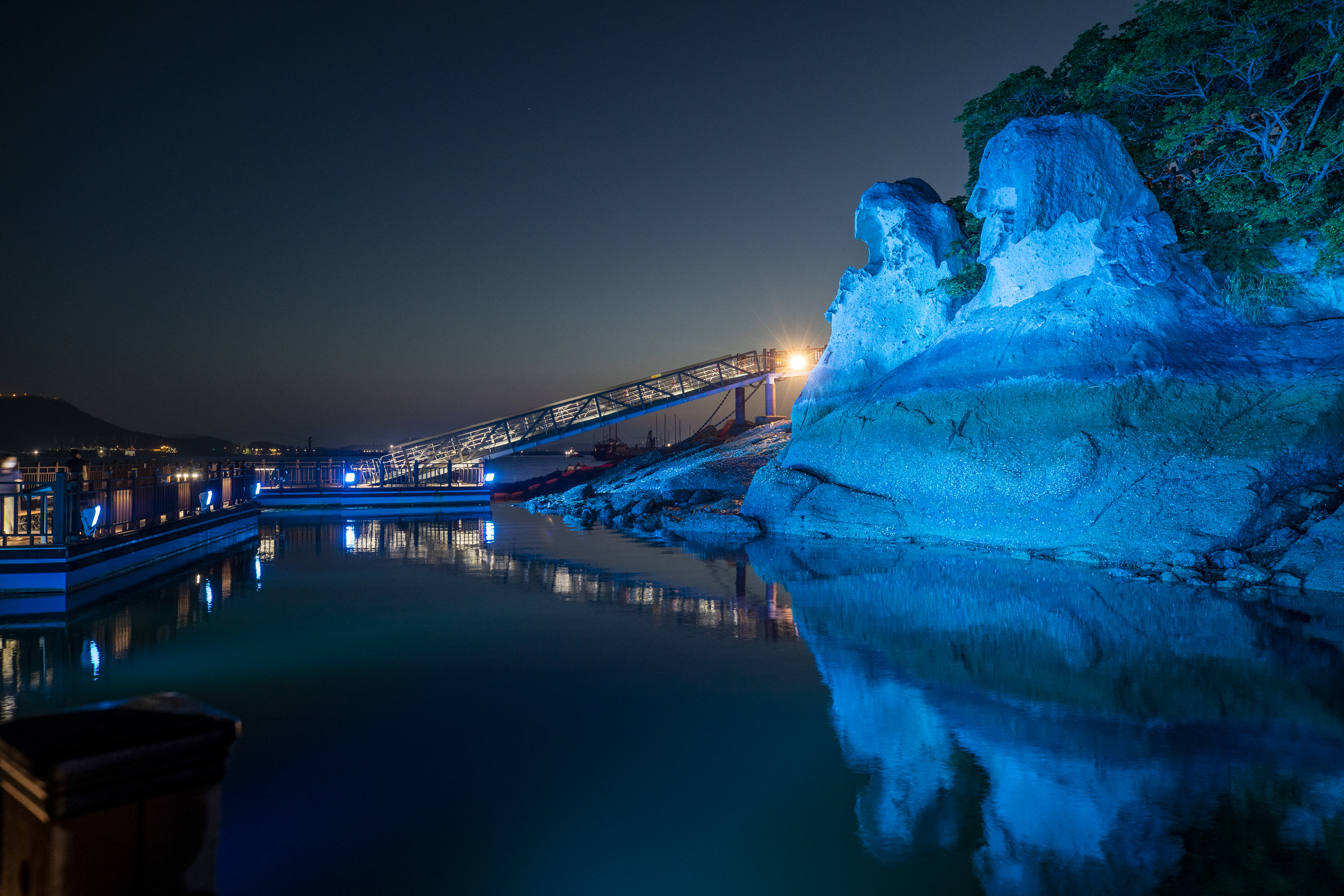
Gatbawi, Mokpo

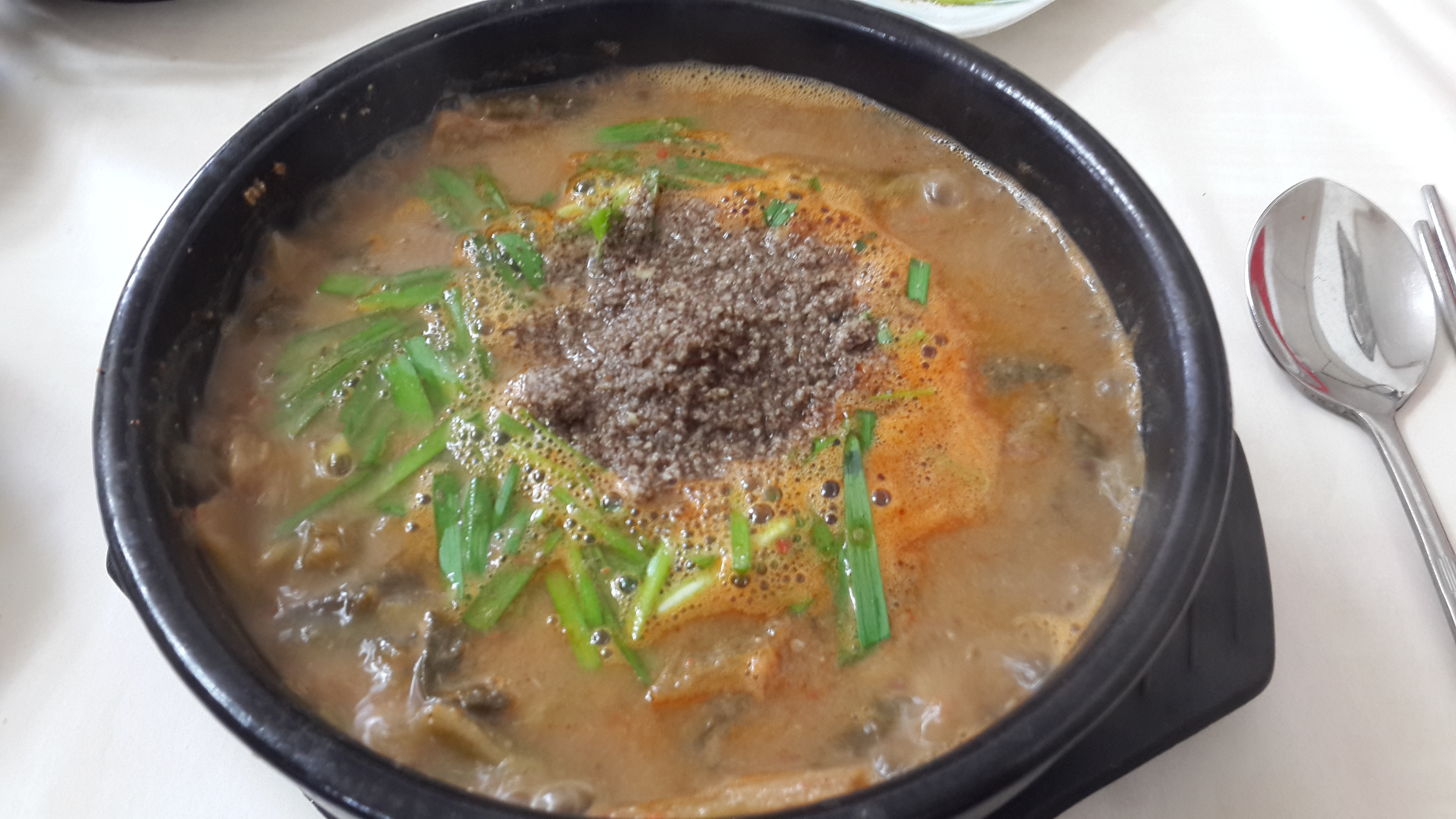
Chueotang

== See also ==
- Jeonnam-Gwangju
- North Jeolla Province

== Sources ==
- "KOSIS". kosis.kr.
