= Namak, South Korea =

Planned city in South Korea

- Hangul: 남악신도시
- Hanja: 南岳新都市
- Revised Romanization: Namak sindosi
- McCune–Reischauer: Namak sindosi

Namak New Town is a planned city surrounding Buju-dong, Samhyang-dong of Mokpo, and Samhyang-eup, Illo-eup of Muan County in South Korea.
