= Beyranvand-e Shomali Rural District =

Rural district in Lorestan province, Iran

Beyranvand-e Shomali Rural District Persian: دهستان بيرانوند شمالي
- Rural District
- Location within Iran
- Coordinates: 33°46′N 48°31′E
- Country: Iran
- Province: Lorestan
- County: Khorramabad
- District: Beyranvand
- Established: 1987
- Capital: Bid Hal

Population (2016)
  - Total: 3,736
- Time zone: UTC+3:30 (IRST)

Beyranvand-e Shomali Rural District (Persian: دهستان بيرانوند شمالي) is in Beyranvand District (Note: Formerly Chaghalvandi District) of Khorramabad County, Lorestan province, Iran. Its capital is the village of Bid Hal. The previous capital of the rural district was the village of Khar Eshgaft.

== Demographics ==
=== Population ===
At the time of the 2006 National Census, the rural district's population was 3,525 in 767 households. There were 3,476 inhabitants in 888 households at the following census of 2011. The 2016 census measured the population of the rural district as 3,736 in 1,049 households. The most populous of its 35 villages was Tappeh Goji, with 857 people.

=== Other villages in the rural district ===
- Buganeh Razbashi
- Chaqabal
- Dar Balut-e Olya
- Dar Balut-e Pain
- Gol Zard
- Tappeh Shir Khan
