= Beyranvand-e Jonubi Rural District =

Rural district in Lorestan province, Iran

Beyranvand-e Jonubi Rural District Persian: دهستان بيرانوند جنوبي
- Rural District
- Location within Iran
- Coordinates: 33°38′N 48°36′E
- Country: Iran
- Province: Lorestan
- County: Khorramabad
- District: Beyranvand
- Established: 1987

Population (2016)
  - Total: 6,547
- Time zone: UTC+3:30 (IRST)

Beyranvand-e Jonubi Rural District (Persian: دهستان بيرانوند جنوبي) is in Beyranvand District (Note: Formerly Chaghalvandi District) of Khorramabad County, Lorestan province, Iran.

== Demographics ==
=== Population ===
At the time of the 2006 National Census, the rural district's population was 6,309 in 1,359 households. There were 5,994 inhabitants in 1,567 households at the following census of 2011. The 2016 census measured the population of the rural district as 6,547 in 1,752 households. The most populous of its 71 villages was Namaklan-e Bala, with 540 people.

=== Other villages in the rural district ===
- Baqla Kuh
- Kasian-e Rostam Khani
- Namaklan-e Pain
- Para Puneh
- Sarab-e Darab
- Sarab-e Elyas
- Sharaf Bag

Bana Zardeh (Persian: بن زرده; 33°39′30″N 48°40′32″E) is a village in the district. At the 2006 census, its population was 55, in 11 families.
