= Beyranvand District =

District in Lorestan province, Iran

Beyranvand District Persian: بخش بيرانوند
- District
- Location within Iran
- Coordinates: 33°42′N 48°33′E
- Country: Iran
- Province: Lorestan
- County: Khorramabad
- Capital: Beyranshahr

Population (2016)
  - Total: 12,003
- Time zone: UTC+3:30 (IRST)

Beyranvand District (Persian: بخش بيرانوند) (Note: Formerly Chaghalvandi District (بخش چغلوندی)) is in Khorramabad County, Lorestan province, Iran. Its capital is the city of Beyranshahr. (Note: Formerly Chaghalvandi)

== Demographics ==
=== Population ===
At the time of the 2006 National Census, the district's population was 11,378 in 2,462 households. The following census in 2011 counted 10,879 people in 2,777 households. The 2016 census measured the population of the district as 12,003 inhabitants in 2,777 households.

=== Administrative divisions ===
Beyranvand District Population
Administrative Divisions	2006	2011	2016
Beyranvand-e Jonubi RD	6,309	5,994	6,547
Beyranvand-e Shomali RD	3,525	3,476	3,736
Beyranshahr (city)	1,544	1,409	1,720
Total	11,378	10,879	12,003
RD = Rural District
