= Khorramabad County =

County in Lorestan province, Iran

Khorramabad County Persian: شهرستان خرم‌آباد
- County
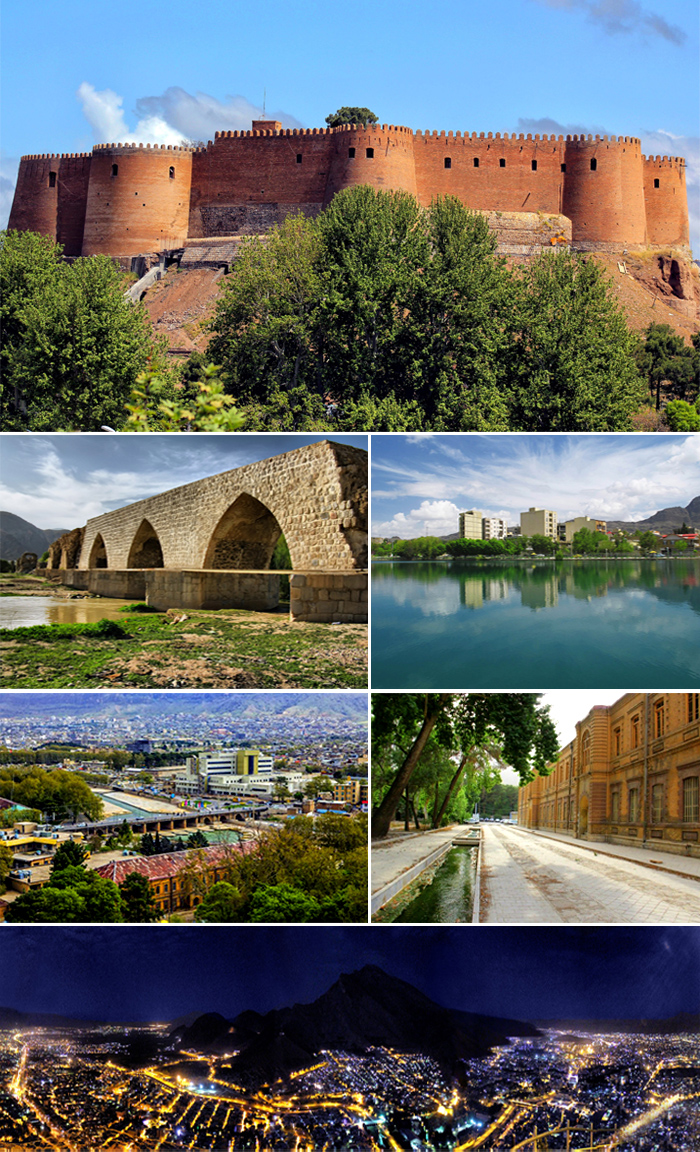

- Location of Khorramabad County in Lorestan province (center, pink)

- Location of Lorestan province in Iran
- Coordinates: 33°21′N 48°31′E
- Country: Iran
- Province: Lorestan
- Capital: Khorramabad
- Districts: Central, Beyranvand, Papi, Zagheh

Population (2016)
  - Total: 506,471
- Time zone: UTC+3:30 (IRST)

Khorramabad County (Persian: شهرستان خرم‌آباد) is in Lorestan province, Iran. Its capital is the city of Khorramabad.

== History ==
In 2007, Dowreh-ye Chegeni and Veysian Districts were separated from the county in the establishment of Dowreh County. (Note: Renamed Chegeni County in 2019)

== Demographics ==
=== Language ===
The county's population is mainly Lur and Kurdish Lak.

See below, the linguistic composition of the county:

Khorramabad linguistic composition (2022)
Language	percent
Luri	60%
Laki	40%

=== Population ===
At the time of the 2006 National Census, the county's population was 509,251 in 113,886 households. The following census in 2011 counted 487,167 people in 128,600 households. The 2016 census measured the population of the county as 506,471 in 144,958 households.

=== Administrative divisions ===
Khorramabad County's population history and administrative structure over three consecutive censuses are shown in the following table.

Khorramabad County Population
Administrative Divisions	2006	2011	2016
Central District	417,556	445,627	463,599
Azna RD	6,214	6,190	5,859
Dehpir-e Jonubi RD (Note: Formerly Dehpir Rural District)	7,479	9,659	10,258
Dehpir-e Shomali RD	6,332	6,108	6,082
Kakasharaf RD	4,091	3,627	2,742
Koregah-e Gharbi RD (Note: Formerly Koregah Rural District)	45,409	50,971	42,884
Koregah-e Sharqi RD	11,294	12,456	11,759
Robat RD	8,193	8,400	10,599
Khorramabad (city)	328,544	348,216	373,416
Beyranvand District (Note: Formerly Chaghalvandi District)	11,378	10,879	12,003
Beyranvand-e Jonubi RD	6,309	5,994	6,547
Beyranvand-e Shomali RD	3,525	3,476	3,736
Beyranshahr (city) (Note: Formerly Chaghalvandi)	1,544	1,409	1,720
Dowreh-ye Chegeni District (Note: Transferred to Dowreh County, later renamed Chegeni County)	31,117		
Dowreh RD	9,208		
Kashkan RD (Note: Renamed Kashkan-e Shomali Rural District)	10,294		
Teshkan RD	10,303		
Sarab-e Dowreh (city)	1,312		
Papi District	16,898	13,514	12,204
Chamsangar RD	2,520	1,942	1,675
Gerit RD	2,145	1,876	1,539
Keshvar RD	1,873	1,379	1,206
Sepiddasht RD	5,117	3,741	3,610
Tang-e Haft RD	2,046	2,031	1,257
Sepiddasht (city)	3,197	2,545	2,917
Veysian District	13,029		
Shurab RD	5,081		
Veysian RD	6,131		
Veysian (city) (Note: Formerly Mahmudvand)	1,817		
Zagheh District	19,273	16,869	17,440
Qaedrahmat RD	7,381	6,449	6,108
Razan RD	3,102	2,052	3,260
Zagheh RD	5,951	5,683	5,296
Zagheh (city)	2,839	2,685	2,776
Total	509,251	487,167	506,471
RD = Rural District

== Colleges and universities ==
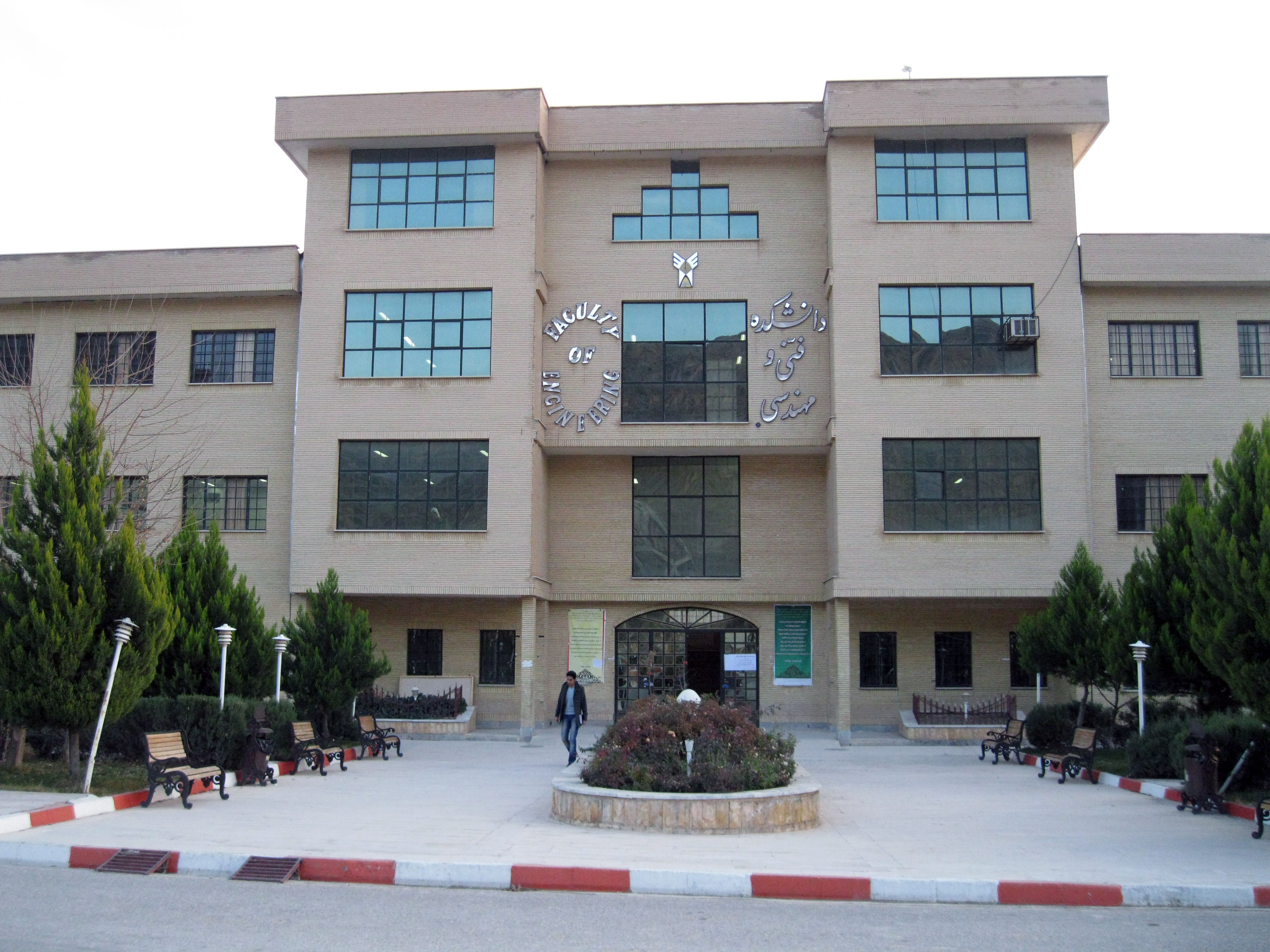
Islamic Azad University of Khorramabad

- Islamic Azad University of Khorram Abad
- Lorestan University
- Lorestan University of Medical Sciences
- Madanni Technical College

== Historical attractions ==
In the current location of Khorramabad, there was a city called Khaydalau from the Elamite period, and later the city of Shapurkhast was built on its ruins and around the current location of the city by order of Shapur I of the Sassanid Empire.

There are numerous historical and natural tourist attractions in the city of Khorramabad, including Falak-ol-Aflak Castle, a brick minaret, a broken bridge, a stone whirlpool, an inscription, Baba Taher's tomb, and Lake Kio.

== See also ==
Media related to Khorramabad County at Wikimedia Commons
