= Tears of Mokpo =

1935 by Lee Nan-young

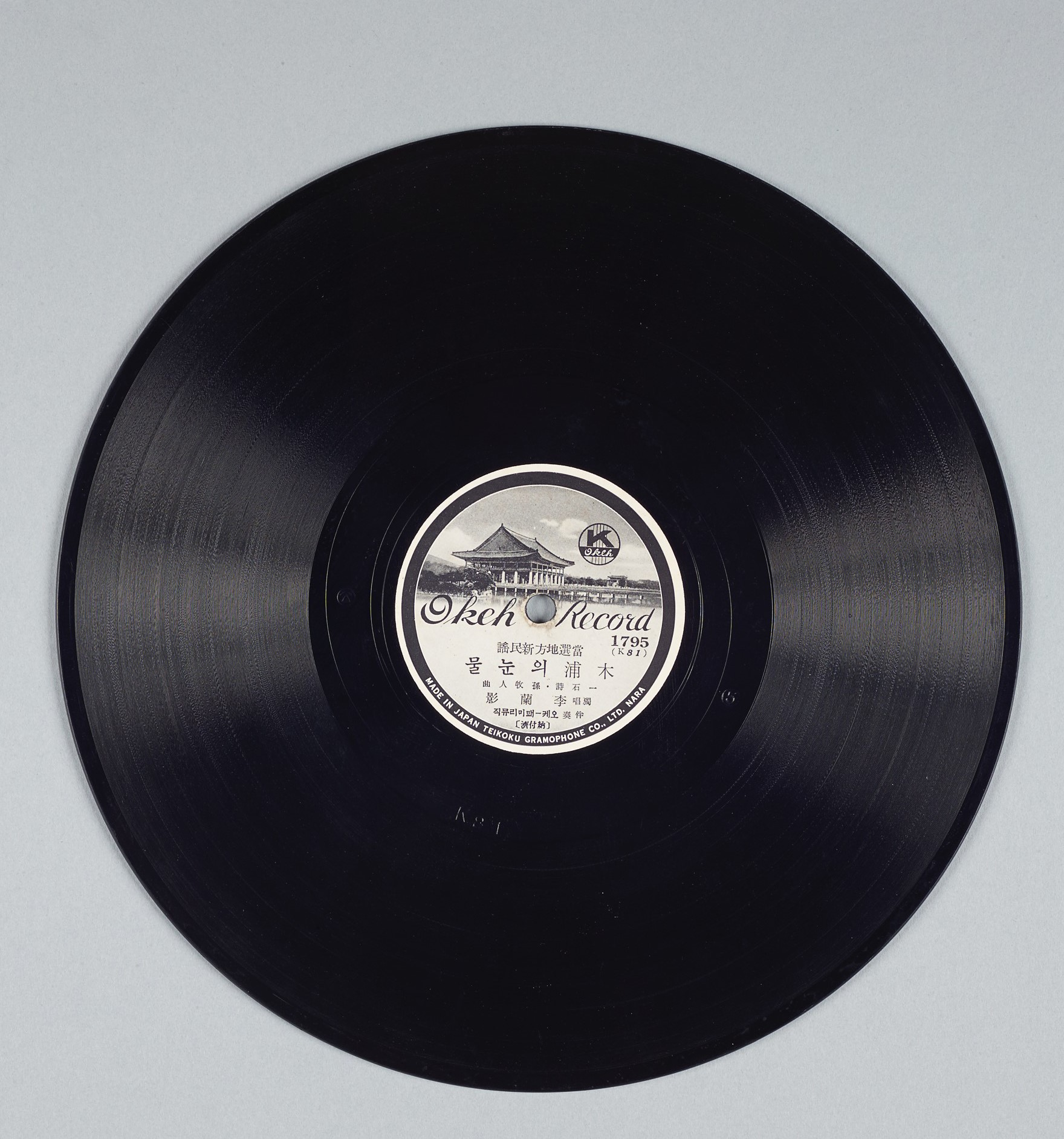
- Record for the song

Song by Lee Nan-young
- Language: Korean
- Published: 1935
- Genre: Trot
- Composer: Son Mogin
- Lyricist: Mun Ilsŏk

"Tears of Mokpo" (Korean: 목포의 눈물) is a Korean-language trot song released in 1935. Its lyrics were written by Mun Ilsŏk (문일석; 文一石), it was composed by Son Mogin, and it was first sung by Lee Nan-young. The song has remained consistently popular since its release, and has been regarded as a representative song of the trot genre and as Lee's most famous song. It is also strongly associated with the city of Mokpo, and mentions several features of it, but is broadly popular in the rest of South Korea too.

== Description ==
The song was produced during the 1910–1945 Japanese colonial period. In early 1935, the Korean newspaper The Chosun Ilbo held a song-writing contest, with an offer to produce a recording of the winning lyrics by September of that year. This song won the contest. The song quickly achieved immense success; it sold 50,000 copies and also became popular in Japan, under the Japanese name Wakare no funa uta (別れの船歌). The song elevated Lee's career.

The song can be interpreted as a sad love song; its lyrics seemingly evoke images of someone longing for another. Who is being longed for is left ambiguous; some have interpreted the target as being Korea, and the song as expressing Korean nationalism. Upon the song's publication, it reportedly quickly drew suspicion from colonial authorities, especially due to one line, which could be interpreted as lamenting 300 years of resentment. While the lyric was excused away during the questioning, the composer of the song later wrote in his autobiography that the lyric was indeed about Korea's resentment towards Japan, which had invaded Korea 300 years earlier. The line references Nojeokbong, a mountain that featured in Korean admiral Yi Sun-sin's successful defense of Korea.

The song is in a 2/4 time signature, and in a D minor pentatonic scale. It is of the trot genre. It has been described as sounding influenced by Japanese music, especially the Japanese genre of enka. The song's popularity is associated with an image of Lee wearing the Korean hanbok, and singing in a demure manner.

The song has remained consistently popular since. It was popular to the extent that in the 1960s, American soldiers were attested to knowing about the song, and in 1966 The New York Times wrote an article about it. There is a monument to the song on the slopes of Yudalsan in Mokpo. One survey published in 2016 had people describing the song as a Korean national anthem. Japanese people have covered and rereleased the music over time. In 2024, a Japanese girl named Azuma Aki (東亜樹) sang a viral cover of the song that reached over 2 million views on YouTube and received praise from many Korean people. Several observers have commented that covers such as these have been seen as symbolic bridges for often-fraught Japan–Korea relations.

== Accolades and honors ==
Awards and honors
Year	Organization	Award	Result	Ref.
2023	Korea World Music Culture Hall of Fame	Hall of Fame	Inducted	
