= Yudalsan =

Mountain in Mokpo, South Korea

- 유달산; 儒達山
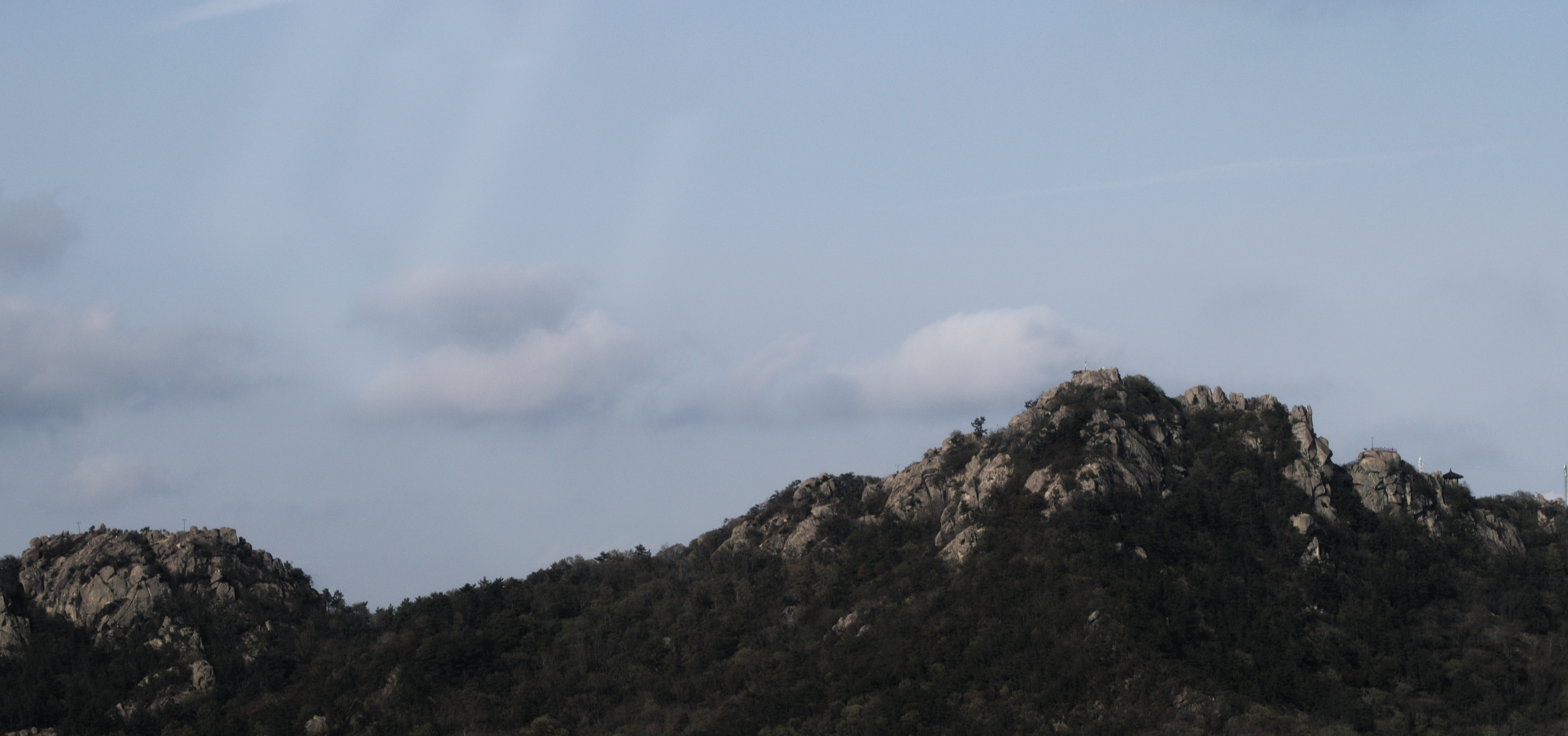
- Yudal Mountain as Seen from the Gohadaero Bridge

Highest point
- Elevation: 228 metres (748 ft)
- Coordinates: 34°47′27.1″N 126°22′20.6″E

Geography
- Location: Mokpo, South Jeolla Province, South Korea

Yudalsan (Korean: 유달산; Hanja: 儒達山) is a mountain located in Mokpo, South Korea. It is 228 m (748 ft) tall. The mountain is sometimes called the Gaegol of the Honam Region, in reference to a nickname for Geumgangsan (now in North Korea).

It is one of the "8 Scenes of Mokpo" and is a symbol of the city. At the summit, thousands of islands can be seen with several hills of strange looking rocks. The three highest peaks are called first, second and madang bawi(rock). Two monuments are found on or near the mountain; the first is a statue of General Yi Sun-sin, the other is of a famous singer Lee Nan-young.

The city has initiated a project called "city of light," in which nightlights are placed around its flora. This has been criticized for creating more light pollution. An environmental association in Gwangju and Jeollanamdo selected this incident as the 10th worst attack on the environment in 2006.

Yudal Mt. Flower festival is held annually in April or May. The spectacle can be seen when climbing to the summit to look over Dadohaehaesang National Park with hundreds of islands within the view. The height gives a great view of the sunset and has gained fame for its sunset views.

Another famous attraction on the mountain is the first sculpture-theme park in South Korea. In 1982, the park was created for the outdoor exhibition to attract donations or to lease sculptures from the artists. In 2008, the subjects of 'Nature, Culture and Sculpture' were chosen to represent Mokpo as emblems of the city. Nearby, the halls for ecology and oriental orchids are open to public.
