= Mokpo Cultural Complex =

Performing arts complex in South Korea

Mokpo Cultural Complex (Korean: 목포문화예술회관) is located at the city of Mokpo for meeting demands of residents in terms of performing arts and exhibition. It is near Gatbawi and belongs to the districts of culture and tourism.

The 2 wings exist to be divided into performing arts and exhibition for former to seat 700 people at most. Owing to the lack of the scale, it is said that that building is least for accommodating many audience for children's performance or music festival.

The exhibition hall hosts annual conventions and exhibitions throughout the year organized by local councils and groups specializing in areas such as Korean calligraphy, Korean painting, and orchids.[1][2] In addition to these exhibitions, the venue hosts performances by classical musicians for local audiences.[3]

The night lighting project of the city enlightened the museum all around.

== Bus ==
- Bus No.7 and 15 crosses the building while no.20 nearly gives accessibility, reaching Gatbawi tunnel.
