= Mokpo =

City in South Jeolla, South Korea

Mokpo 목포
- Municipal city
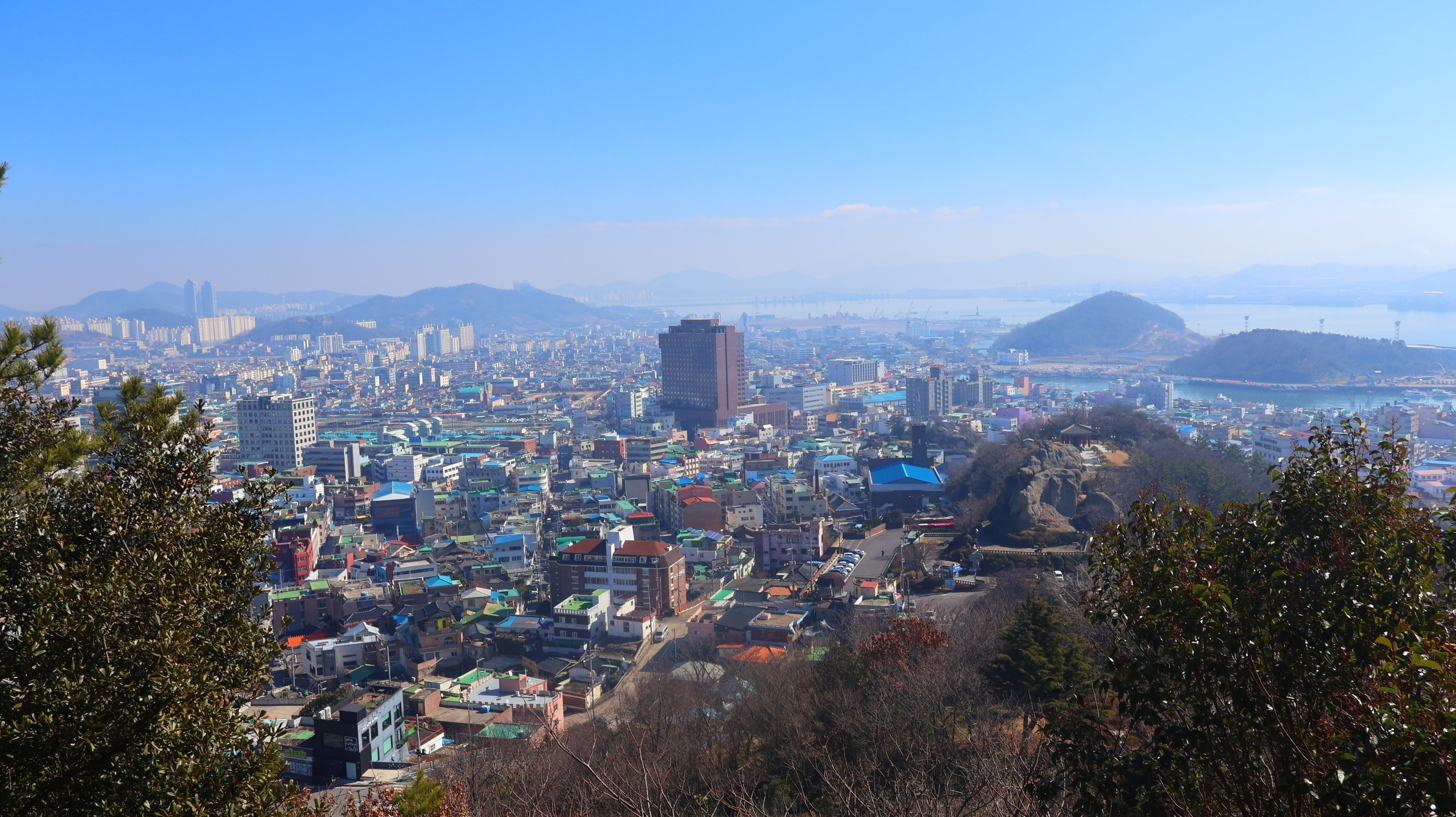
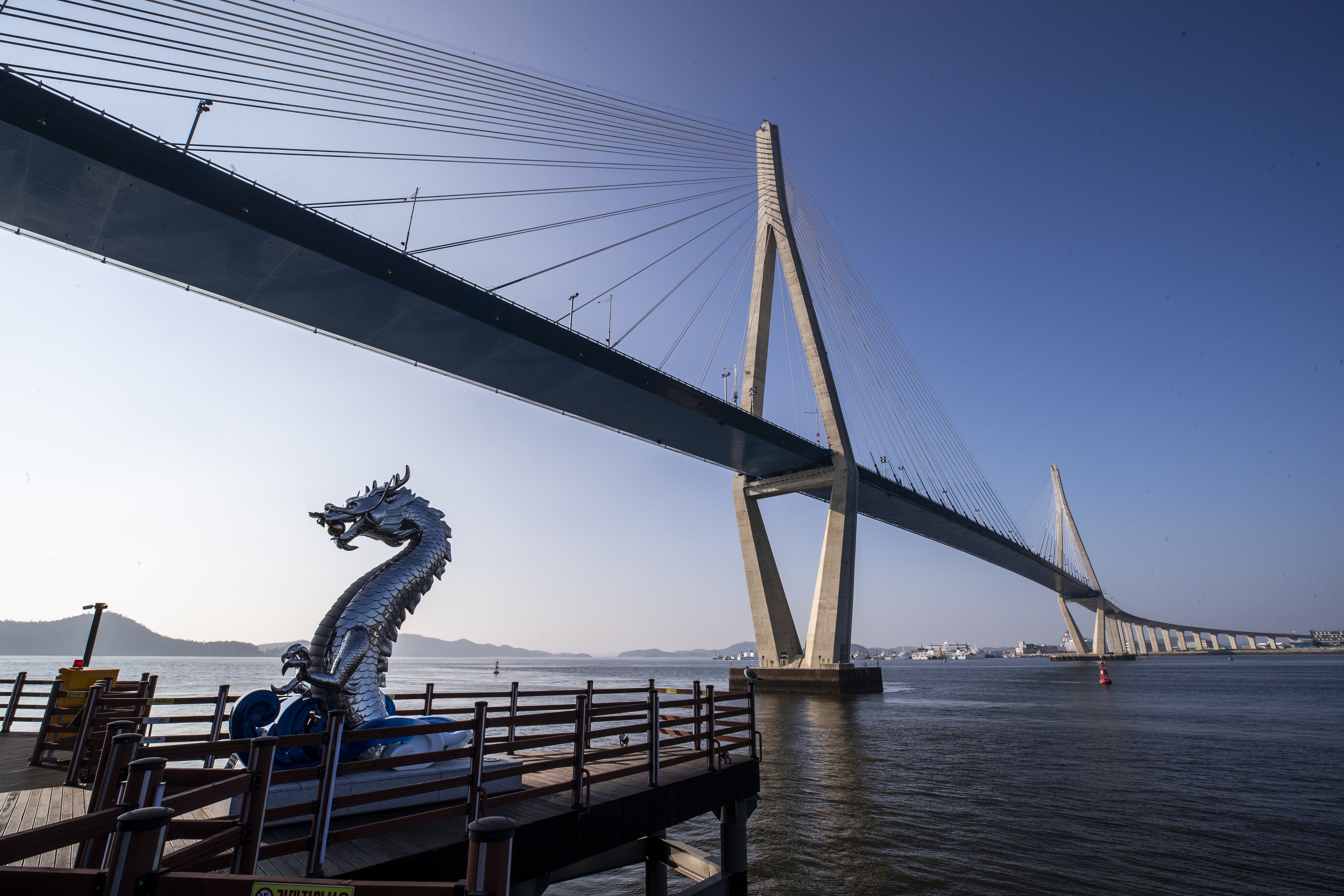
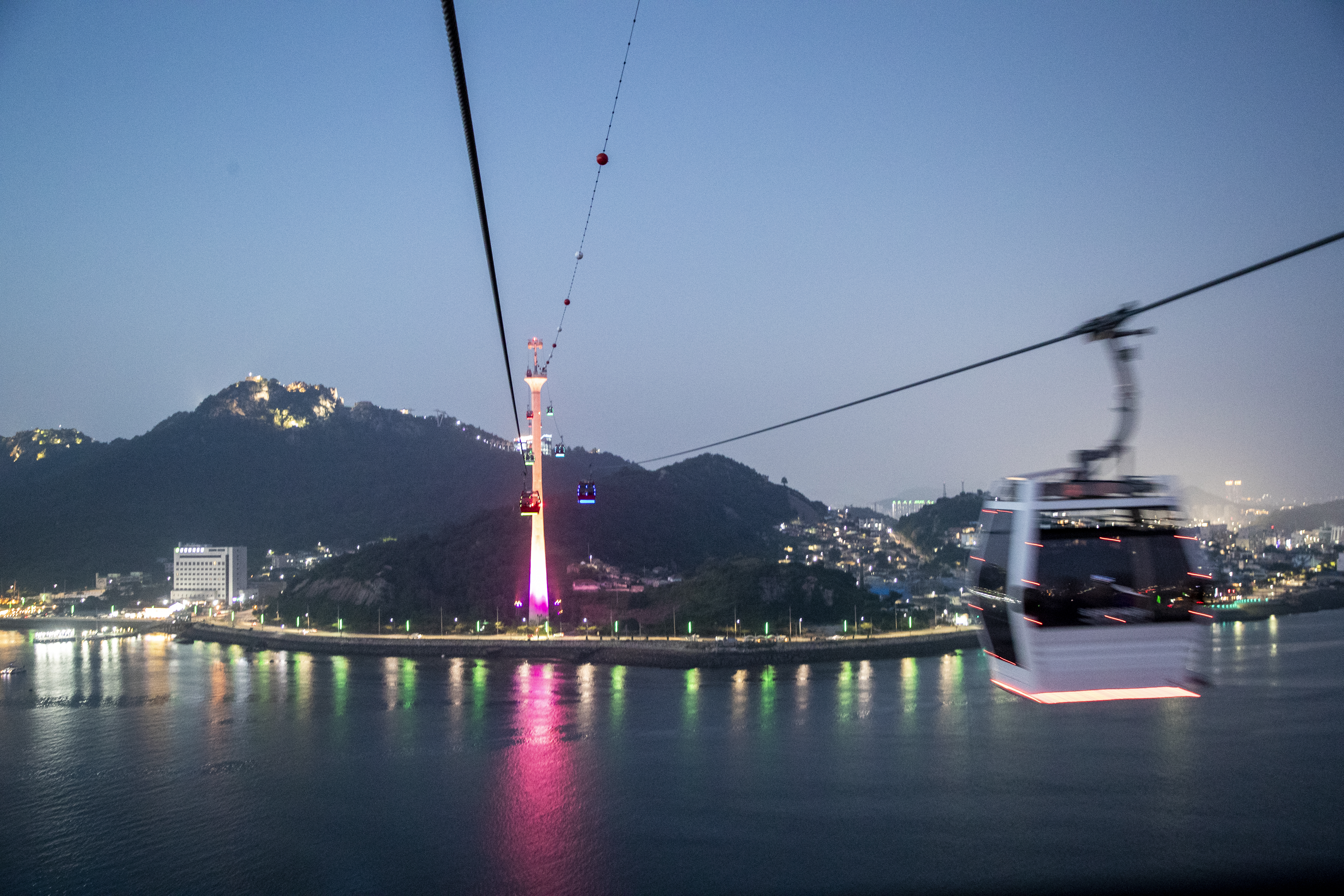
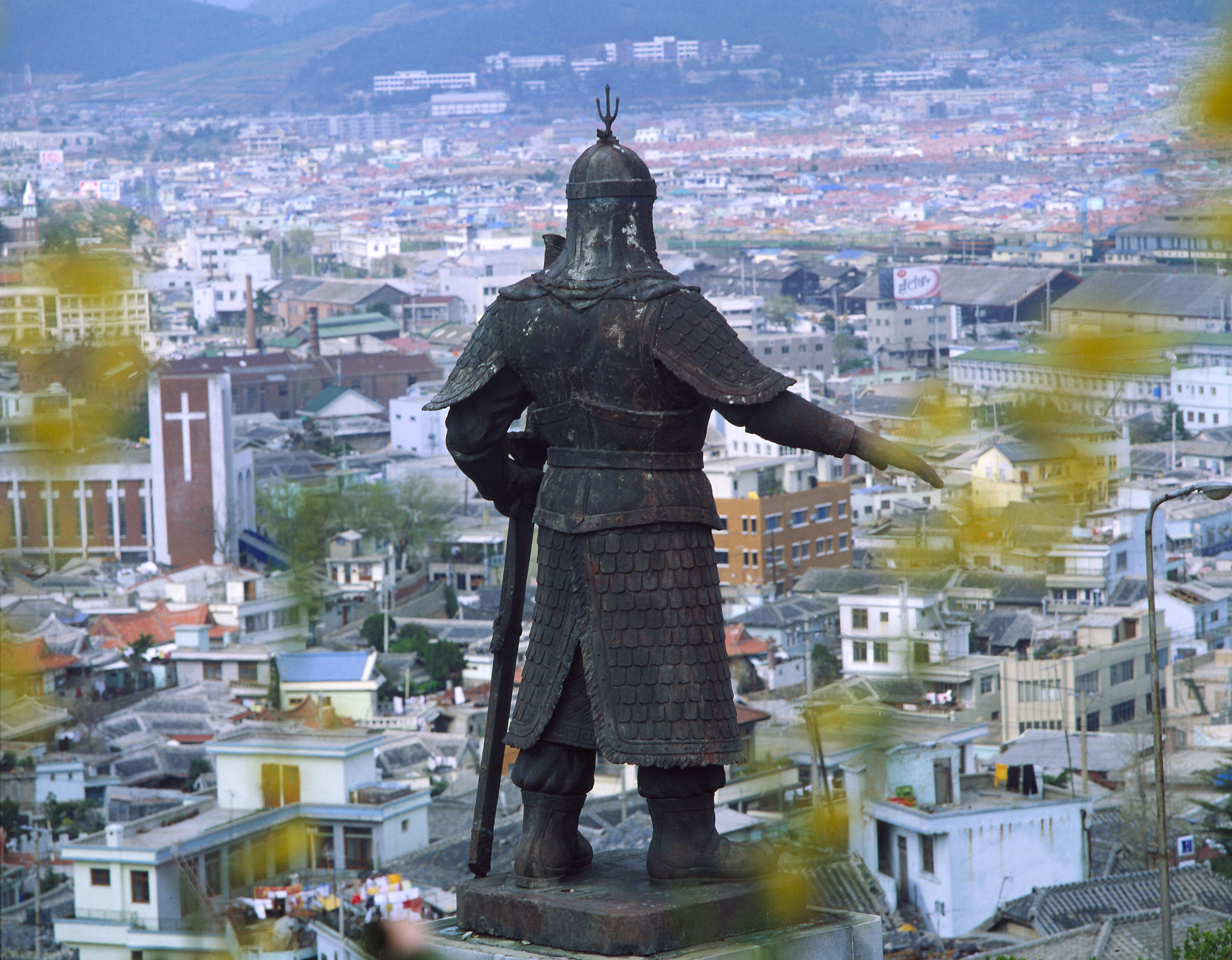
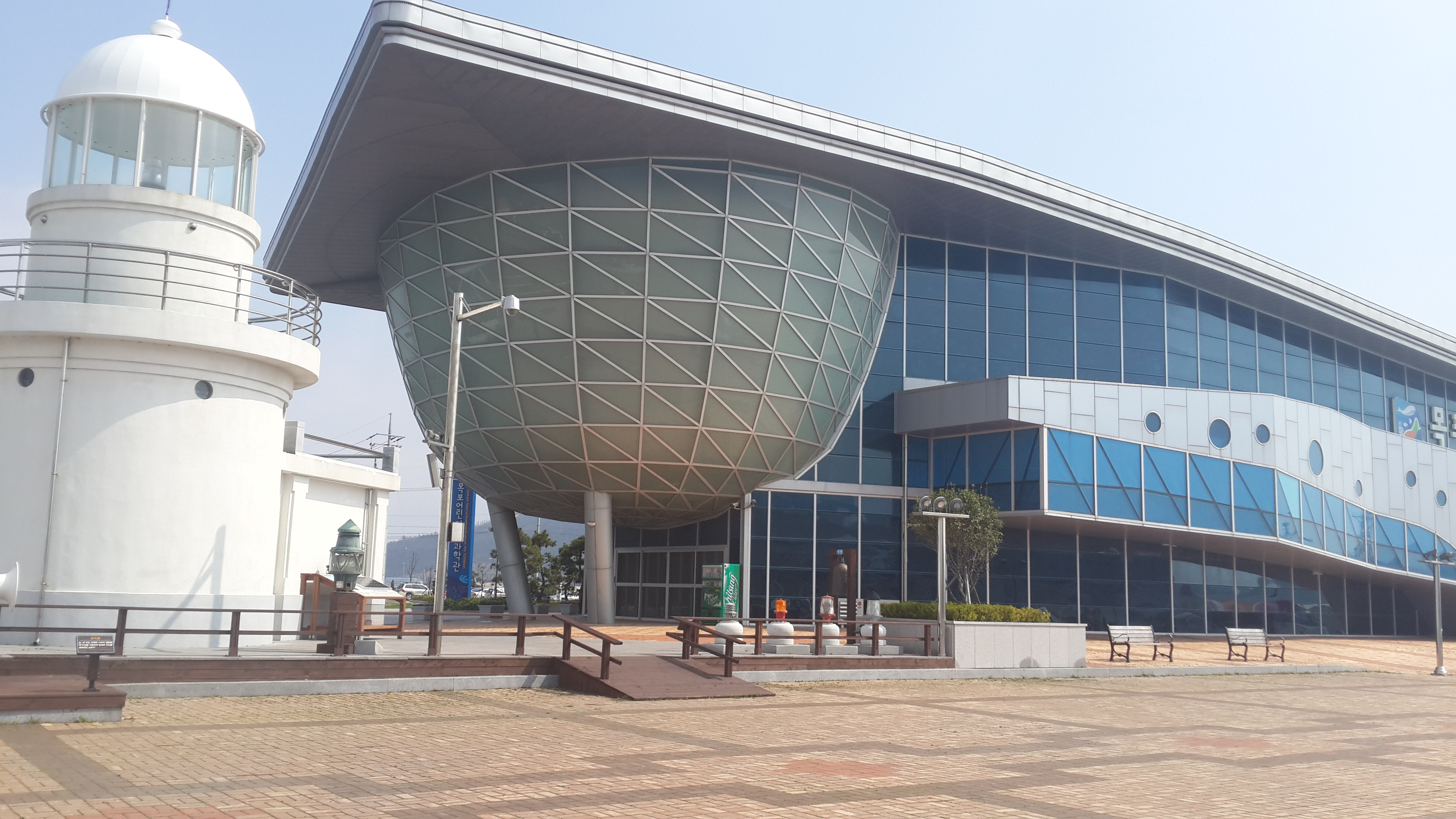
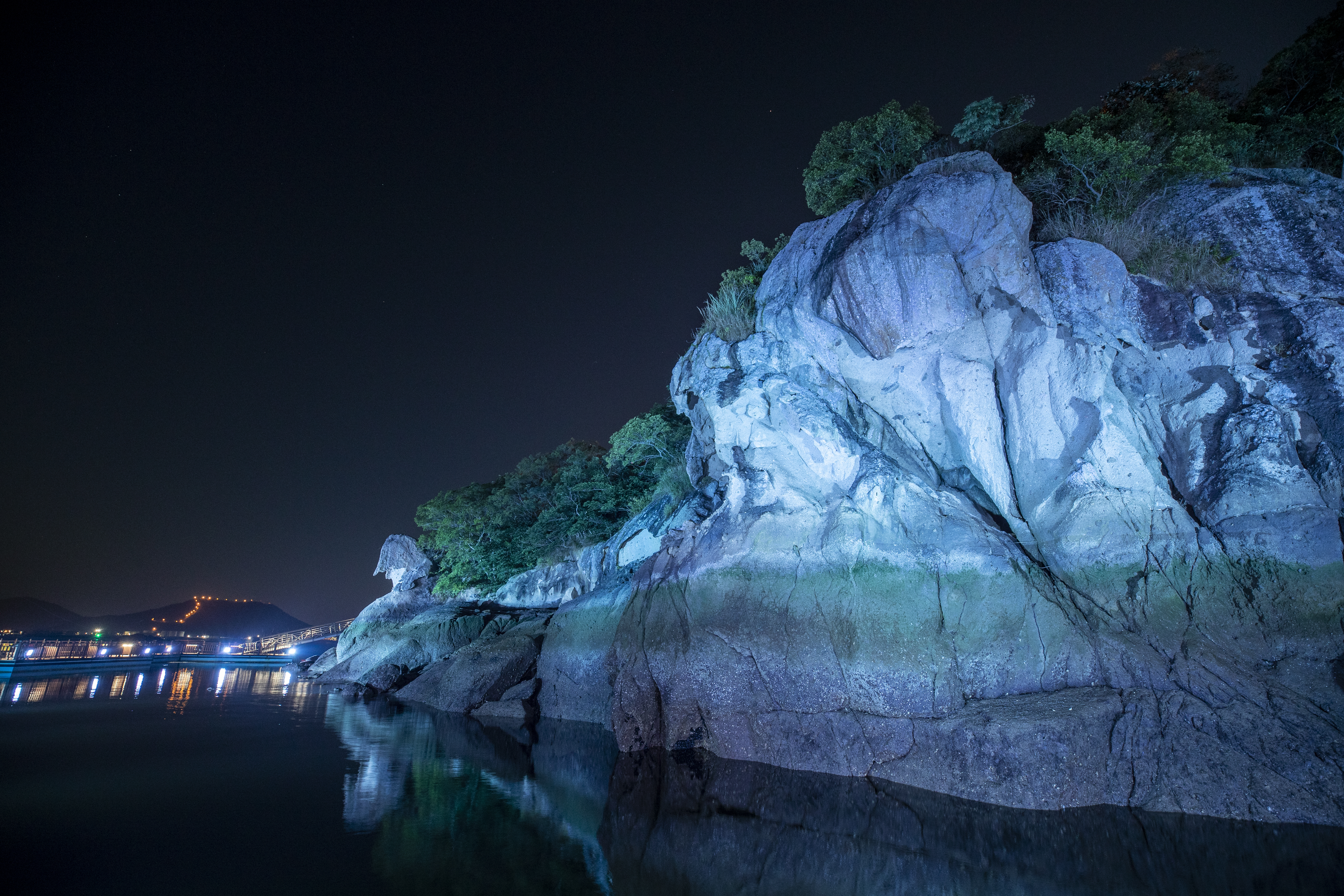
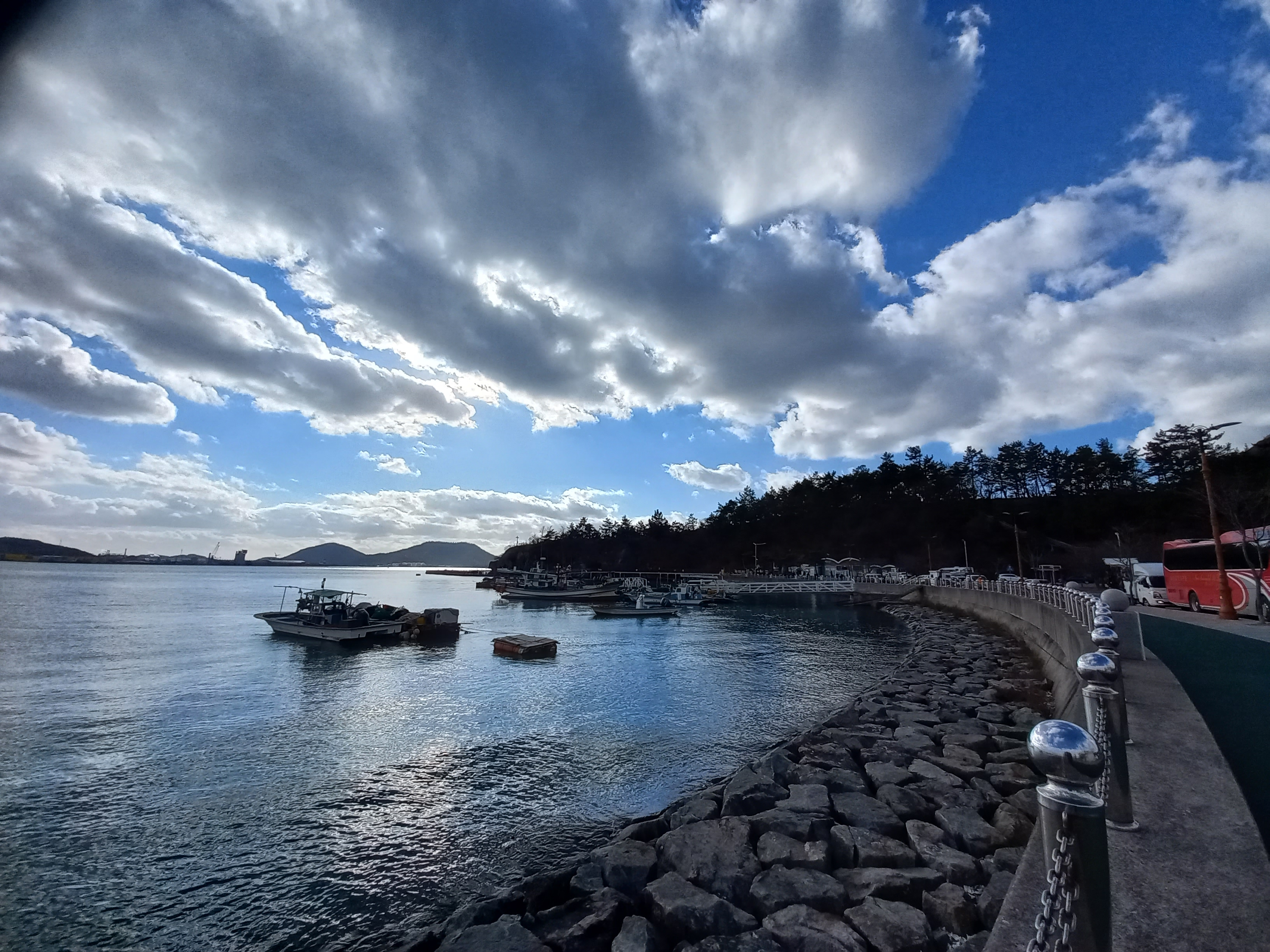
- View of Mokpo from Yudalsan Goha Island and the Mokpo Bridge Mokpo Marine Cable Car Yi Sun-sin statue Marine Science Museum Gatbawi Peace Plaza road

- Flag Emblem of Mokpo

- Location in South Korea
- Coordinates: 34.7589°N 126.38°E
- Country: South Korea
- Provincial-level city: Jeonnam-Gwangju
- Administrative divisions: 22 dong

Government
  - Mayor: Bak Hong-ryul (박홍률)

Area
  - Total: 50.08 km^{2} (19.34 sq mi)

Population (September 2024)
  - Total: 210,806
  - Density: 4,209/km^{2} (10,900/sq mi)
- Time zone: UTC+9 (Korea Standard Time)
- Area code: +82-61

Korean name
- Hangul: 목포시
- Hanja: 木浦市
- RR: Mokpo-si
- MR: Mokp'o-si

Mokpo (Korean: 목포; Korean pronunciation: [mok̚.pʰo]) is a city in Jeonnam-Gwangju, South Korea. It is located at the southwestern tip of the Korean Peninsula, close to the mountain Yudalsan. Mokpo has frequent high-speed train services to Seoul, and is the terminus for a number of ferry routes serving islands in the adjacent Yellow Sea and Dadohae National Maritime Park. To the southwest of the city is Yudalsan Mountain, which is surrounded by strange cliffs like a wall. There are six populated and five uninhabited islands.

The Mokpo Special Tourist Zone covers 6.9 kilometres (4.3 mi) from the northern port to Yudalsan, Old Town Area, Samhakdo, and Gatbawi. It is home to attractions such as the Mokpo Natural History Museum and the National Maritime Museum. To live up to its name as a coastal city, the city's traditional dishes include a variety of seafood dishes, including raw croaker, braised hairtail, skate, and seasoned crab.

The city was once part of South Jeolla Province, but on July 1, 2026, that province was dissolved and merged with Gwangju into the provincial-level city of Jeonnam-Gwangju. Now, the city is directly managed under Jeonnam-Gwangju.

== Etymology ==
Mokpo means literally "tree harbor". This terminology initially appeared in the Goryeosa (History of Goryeo). Therefore, some historians argue that the city's name referred to trees within the region of the port of Mokpo. Another theory suggests that the "mok" in the city's name refers to "the throat," a metaphor for the importance of the city's location as an entrance to the Yellow Sea.

== History ==
=== Mahan and Three Kingdoms eras ===
Mokpo belonged to the Mahan confederacy during the early era of the three Han confederacies during the Samhan period, and was called Mul'ahye-gun while under the control of the Baekje kingdom. After Silla defeated Baekje, Mokpo's region was absorbed, and its name was changed to Myeonju. In 946, its name was once again changed to Mullyang-gun, and it became part of the Muan prefecture, in the Haeyang province. At the time, the prefecture of Muan referred to a much larger area, which incorporated not only Mokpo but also the area currently called Muan and several islands of Sinan county. According to a KBS documentary, coastal and offshore areas of Mokpo witnessed superior productivity of crops, and important shipping routes to Naju were established along the Yeongsan River.

=== Goryeo and Joseon dynasties ===
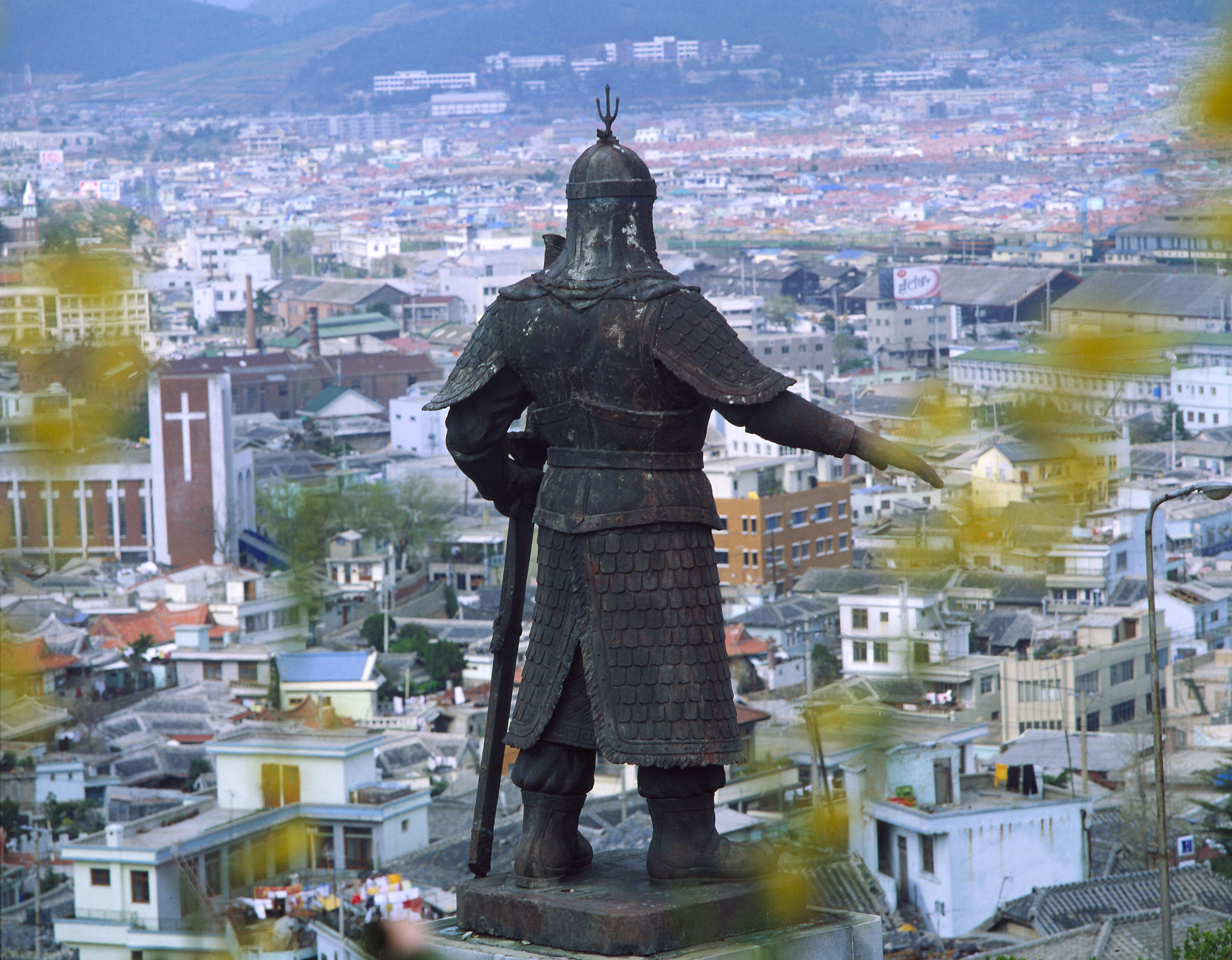
To commemorate his role in the region's history, a statue of Admiral Yi Sun-sin now stands guard over Mokpo.

What is today known as Mokpo had its origins in the Goryeo period. That dynasty's founder, Wang Geon, was serving as a general for later Goguryeo (also known as Taebong), ruled by Gung Ye. Taebong covered the central area of the Korean peninsula including current-day Gaeseong, which was then called Song'ak.

As a naval power, Wang Geon was ordered to attack the kingdom of Later Baekje, which, like later Goguryeo, was a kingdom which emerged after the disintegration of Unified Silla. The operation met fairly successful results. During this time, Wang Geon met his second queen, Queen Janghwa, with whom he had a son, who eventually became Hyejong of Goryeo.

In 1439, 21 years after King Sejong of the Joseon Dynasty came to power, the Mokpo garrison (jin) was established, which was designed to control twelve offshore islands. During the Japanese invasions of Korea (1592–1598), Admiral Yi Sun-sin established a garrison of naval forces at Mokpo and the island of Goha, to secure a base for provisions and ship repairs, such as the turtle ships, also known as the geobukseon and panokseon.

=== Open port ===
On 1 October 1897, Mokpo became an open port, fifteen years after the opening of the port of Incheon. For Japan, Mokpo held a geographical advantage being located midway between Nagasaki, Japan, and the Chinese mainland. Japan also valued Mokpo for its proximity to the abundant crops of the Jeolla provinces. After its opening, housing for Japanese settlers was rapidly developed to establish self-government. The Japanese settled predominately in what is today the Yudal-dong neighborhood, close to the main port. The Japanese consulate remained there until the establishment of the Japanese protectorate over Korea.

The Japanese settlers gradually bought farmland in the vicinity of Mokpo, which had previously been illegal. These agricultural fields were desirable because they were inexpensive and not heavily taxed. The resulting harvests from these fields made rice cheaper in Japan, although the price of rice in Jeolla province doubled as a result. After 1905, the influx of Japanese settlers increased and they expanded into Geumhwa-dong, where many cherry trees were planted along the street. Japanese called this area "Sakuramachi", which means "the downtown of cherry blossom trees." With Korea's full annexation by Japan in 1910, the city was given a new name, Mokpo-bu, and saw the construction of the colonial institution, the Oriental Development Company that facilitated land, agriculture, and settlement projects in the city.

=== Under Japanese rule ===
Mokpo's status as an open port made it a viable option to use the nearby county of Wando as a link to the region's many offshore islands. In 1914, the completion of the Honam railway line connected the city to Daejeon. On 1 April 1914, the county of Mokpo-bu was divided into several administrative sections. Only the county's urban downtown area, Bunae-myeon, became what is today Mokpo City. Following Order Number 11 of the General Japanese Government of Korea, Muan county incorporated Jido, Palguem, and Docho, which were the other areas formerly comprising Mokpo-bu. During the Japanese colonial period, Mokpo's harbor was used to forcibly export the produce of the region.

In 1918, the colonists established ginning facilities for manufacturing large amounts of goods in both Mokpo and Iri (current Iksan in North Jeolla province). In 1932, the city incorporated parts of Muan, becoming the 6th largest city in the Korean peninsula with a population of 60,000. Indigenous products were cloth, rice, salt, and coastal foods. The harbor played an important role, supplying goods to Japan, including large quantities of cotton.

=== After independence ===
In 1949, Mokpo-Bu was redesignated Mokpo City, after the government altered the administrative region. In 1973 and 1987, large areas were added to Mokpo city, including one of the most famous tourist spots, Samhakdo (Three Crane Island). Samhakdo was reclaimed by connecting a series of islands, a process of landfill operations which lasted from 1968 to 1973. The island is divided into three major sections, and over six years the city constructed five bridges to link those three sections. In 2000, the city initiated a plan to restore a naturalized island for tourism, which brought tremendous criticism from environmental groups. On 1 March 2007, Samhakdo was opened to the public. Other projects in Mokpo included a coastal filling process near the North Harbor and the building of a new port in Chungmu-dong.

In 1980, the Gwangju Democratization Movement swept the area. In Mokpo, student movements were initiated by several people marching along the boulevard from Mokpo Station to the second plaza, carrying cards displaying the word "Freedom." Mokpo Station served as a hub for many groups supporting the people of Gwangju.

On 1 October 1997, Mokpo celebrated its centennial as a port city, and announced the second opening of the port. Mokpo is the hometown of former President Kim Dae-jung, who received the Nobel Peace Prize in 2001.

Following the sinking of MV Sewol on 16 April 2014, the ship was moved to Mokpo for salvage operations.

On July 1, 2026, South Jeolla Province was dissolved and merged with Gwangju into the provincial-level city of Jeonnam-Gwangju. Mokpo then became directly managed under Jeonnam-Gwangju.

== Administration ==
=== Mayor ===
Mokpo began its local government in 1994. In July 1995 it inaugurated its first mayor, Gwon I Dam, who had been the president of the Munhwa broadcasting corporation. The city's lack of supply in the past caused Gwon to focus on improving the city's water supplies. In 2000, the mayor officially provided aid for North Korea in the form of rice shipments. However, Gwon came into conflict with the leaders of the Democratic Party over fair election practices, causing him to leave the party. He filed a lawsuit against the Democratic Party, which the courts subsequently rejected.

Jeon Tae Hong, the next mayor, made some important contributions to Mokpo's government, but he died suddenly in 2005. Following his death, Jeong Jong Deuk was elected mayor, promising protection of the tourism industry. Once in office, Deuk responded to concerns about the depressed condition of the old downtown area by establishing the Office of Original City Replanning and adopted the slogan "City of Light."

Deuk was re-elected in 2006 and, during his second term, the city received several civil and tourism awards. He faced criticism from the local press regarding Mokpo's ability to draw people into the city and changing the attitudes regarding the city's imbalanced economy.

Another dispute arose in 2009, when non-governmental organizations based in Mokpo sued the government to disclose information about budgetary spending, which had been controlled by a city committee chosen by the mayor. The courts sided with the organizations, saying that the budget plan should be reported and monitored.

=== Disputes upon merge ===
In 2004, civil groups promoted merging the three adjacent communities: Sinan, Muan and Mokpo. On 25 September 2009, the city council of Mokpo officially submitted a plan to merge into one central government, but the plan was voted down due to objections from the community.

=== Population ===
In 2007, the population of Mokpo had increased to 90,000 households, with an average of 2.7 people per household. The population density was the 10th highest in South Korea, and it was the second fastest-growing region (after Gyeonggi Province). In 2010, the Bank of Korea reported that the population of western South Jeolla province was declining due to several economic, social and educational issues.

== Education ==
One of the oldest elementary schools, Bukgyo, was established in 1897 for the aristocracy during the Joseon period, following Order No. 145 of Gojong. However, after its annexation by Japan, education in Mokpo was directed towards Japanese students.

Mokpo Commercial High School opened in 1920 as the first secondary-level school. Its name was later changed to Jeonnam Jeil High School. Former president Kim Dae Jung graduated from Jeil.

=== Universities ===
Mokpo National University (MNU) became a nationally supported school in 1976, after 30 years of existence. The school has become regionally famous for its shipbuilding research and other culturally related fields of study. A 2007 study of national universities ranked MNU highly, equal with Seoul National University and Jeonnam National University. Mokpo National Maritime University is a government-funded school specializing in maritime-related studies. Mokpo Catholic University was established in 1967 as Sungshin Nursing College, and later expanded its vocational training to include other fields.

== Economy ==
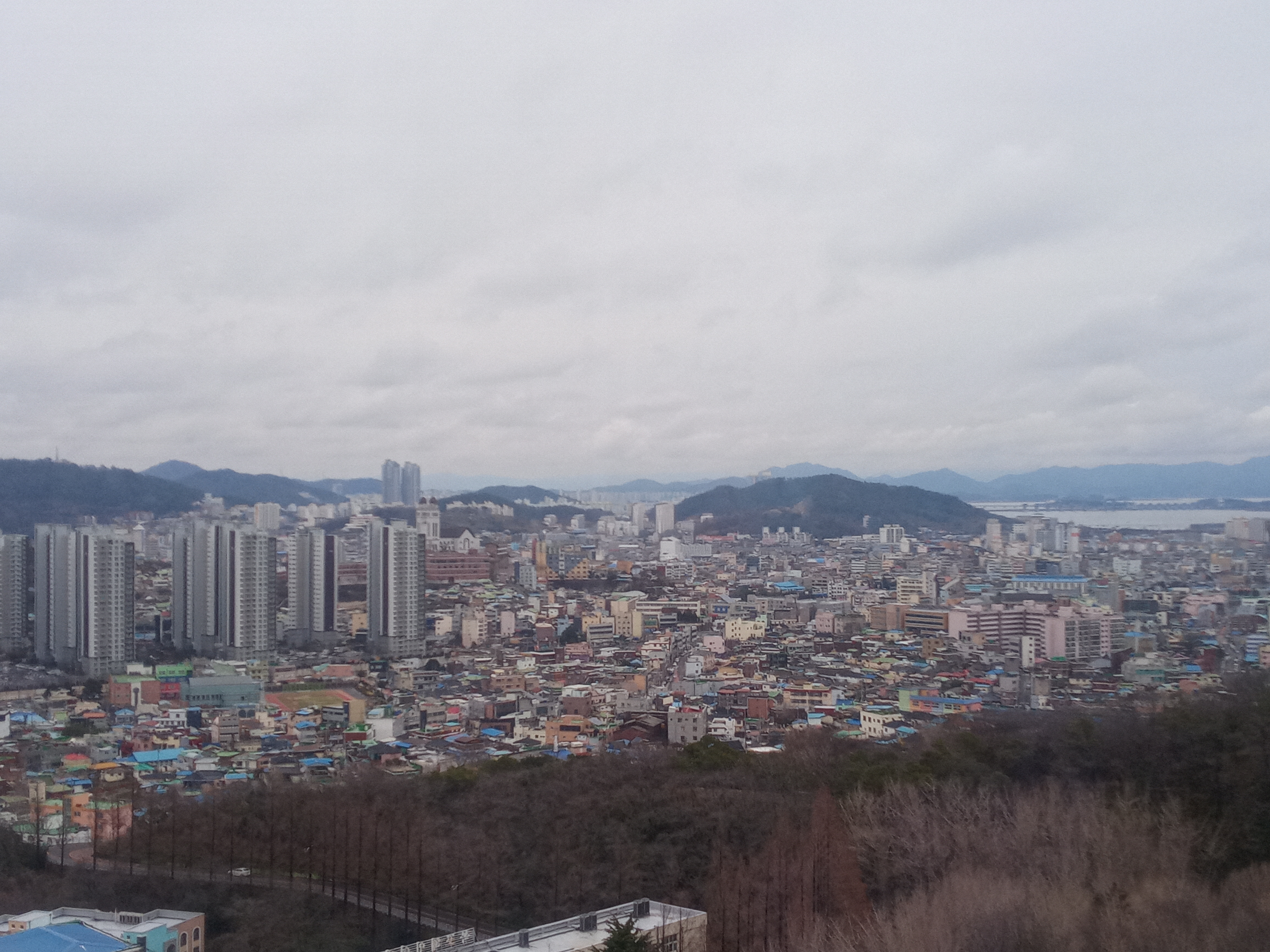
A view of the city (2024)

The harbor began operations earlier than other port cities on the Korean peninsula, allowing the city to experience growth, whereas growth in the country since its independence has concentrated on the Yeongnam area, where trade with Japan and Russia are viable due to the access of coastal routes. The addition of the Chinese economy into the local trade prospects increases the city's potential as a trade center via the Yellow Sea.

=== Commerce ===
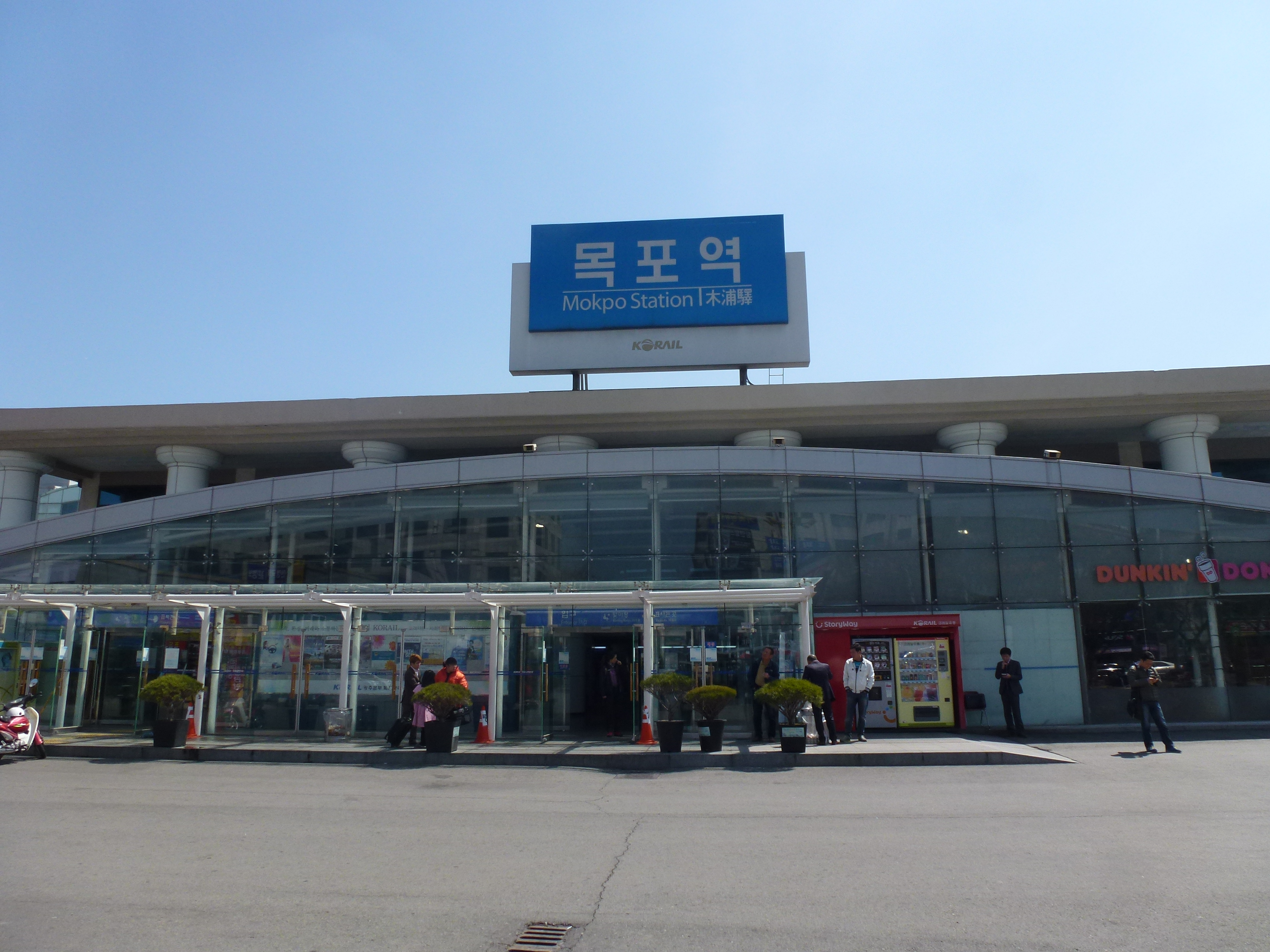
Mokpo station

Until late 1980s, commerce had been concentrated around the original downtown near Mokpo Station. In the late 1990s, large residential areas were built in Yeonsan dong and Hadang, resulting in a significant outflow of the population of the city. This resulted in the city council adopting a bylaw to support the old downtown area, however, the outward flow has only worsened.

Economic power has been notably imbalanced by the opening of Lotte Mart in 2001 and E-Mart in 2002. Home plus is the solitary large-scale market in Mokpo, located in old downtown near the Munhwa broadcasting corporation.

The one exception to the declining economy of the city are the fish markets of Dongmyeong and North Harbor which have been a magnet for tourists and local people looking for octopus or other indigenous products. The economic bureau of the city has spent ₩300 million on promoting the market since early 2009.

=== Companies ===
Companies with operations in Mokpo include the Bohae brewing company and Haengnam chinaware. Bohae Brewing Company produces a brand of soju from the Honam area, of which the best selling product is maple soju (잎새주), the first company to using maple in the brewing of soju. Bohae also entered into a joint development with Asahi Breweries in Japan to expand its soju production operations. In 2008, Bohae became the first Korean brewing company to open up wine sales in the United States, with the exportation of its Rugby Ball wine.

Another major company is Haengnam chinaware, established in May 1942. Its headquarters is in Mokpo, with two other branches, one in Seoul for design and public relations, and another in Yeoju for production. In 1953, the company was the first in Korea to develop coffee cup sets. In 1963, they began trade in Hong Kong, with exports to China growing to more than 2 million dollars in 2008. In 2011, its president signed a Memorandum of Understanding (MOU) with the Ministry of Environment of South Korea to develop a less pollutant-emitting process. The project also includes a publicity campaign to raise public awareness on environmental issues and their effect on rare species.

=== Farming and fishing ===
Mokpo is made up of sparsely populated farmland, with 1,326 households under a half hectare. The area produces high quantities of rice, barley, and beans, with greens and fruits such as tomatoes, cucumbers, and oriental melons increasing in popularity since 2001.

Ships from the harbor often travel to Heuksando to fish for skate and hairtail. Mokpo's yield of marine products reached 26,862 tons in 2006, consisting chiefly of fish, with of shellfish, mollusks, and seaweeds also contributing to the total. Mokpo is known for its harvest of small octopus, although this has declined in recent years. The number of fishermen had dropped to fewer than 3,000, but has been rising since 2007.

=== Industries ===
The regional economy relies heavily on the Daebul industrial complex and Hyundai Samho Heavy Industries located near Yeongam. The imports of merchandise support the local economy of Mokpo as they pass through its harbor. The Halla group was the initial owners of Heavy Industries, until they were taken over by Hyundai, which changed the company name to Hyundai Samho Heavy Industries, with Samho meaning three lakes. By 2007, corporate profits amounted to more than 460 million, an increase of about 25% over those from 2006. South Jeolla province succeeded in attracting a series of investors for renewable energy companies like solar panels. Innovation Silicon Ltd, invested 10bn won in developing a silicon producing complex.

== Geography ==
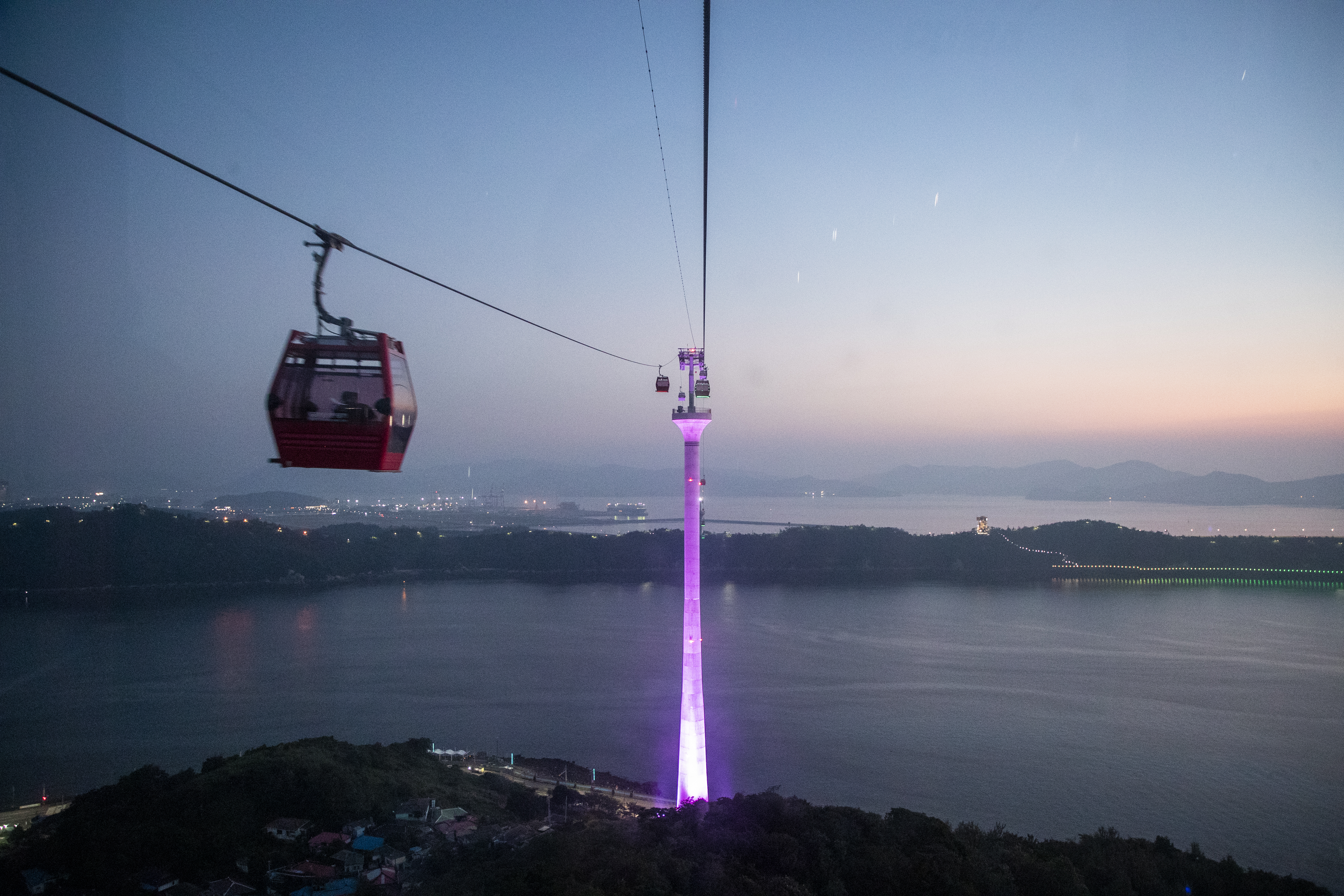
Cable car in Yudalsan

Mokpo sits at the southern end of the Muan peninsula, although the city lies within Sinan county, which mostly consists of 1004 islands. Its neighbor, Muan county, extends northeastward, separated from Mokpo by the Yeongsan river. Yudal mountain (228m) sits at the center of old downtown, and is a source of pride within the city. Its nickname is Gaegol (Korean: 개골), meaning weird-shaped rocks and peaks. The side of the mountain caused roads around the downtown area to have a hilly aspect. Nojeokbong is a historic site where General Yi Soon Shin made use of its shape during the Japanese invasion. The city has small mountains nearby: Mt. Ibam (121m) to the east, and Yangeul (156m) and Daebak (156m) to the north. The mouth of the Yeongsan River flows along the southern side of the city, containing 13 islands. The existence of a natural seawall created a natural safe harbor.

Most of the area of Mokpo consists of land reclamation, including Samhakdo, North harbor (Korean: 북항), and the new city of Hadang. According to the research by Mokpo National University, tributaries of the Yeongsan river crossed the central area of old downtown. This can be seen in the historic names of the Mokone Dong area: Namgyo-dong (southern side of bridge) and Bukgyo-dong (Northern side of bridge). Both names contained "gyo" (Korean: 교; Hanja: 橋), meaning the bridge, indicating a bridge used to link the areas. Tideland reclamation projects removed large amounts of mud flats, including Daebandong, Baekryundong and the coastal shore around Gatbawi. Additionally, the municipal boundaries include 7 desert islands.

The wall at the end of the Yeongsan river prevented damage from flooding during harsh typhoons. Meanwhile, the water quality of the river has worsened to the point where the ministry in charge of environmental protection began studying the impacts made by man-made structures. In 2010, the ministry's report recommended that the seawall should be widened and that the dirty water be pumped out of the riverbeds into the harbor.

=== Climate ===
Mokpo

Climate chart (precipitation, max. and min. temperature)
J	F	M	A	M	J	J	A	S	O	N	D
33 6 −2	42 8 −1	60 12 3	69 18 8	89 22 13	173 26 18	237 28 22	193 30 23	148 27 19	47 22 13	43 15 6	29 9 1
- █ Average max. and min. temperatures in °C
- █ Precipitation totals in mm
Imperial conversion
J	F	M	A	M	J	J	A	S	O	N	D
1.3 43 29	1.7 46 31	2.4 54 37	2.7 64 47	3.5 72 56	6.8 78 65	9.3 83 72	7.6 86 74	5.8 80 66	1.8 72 55	1.7 59 43	1.2 48 33
- █ Average max. and min. temperatures in °F
- █ Precipitation totals in inches

Mokpo's weather station was built along with five other sites in Korea, and began observing weather conditions on 25 March 1904. Mokpo's climate features a short spring and autumn, and it is cold and dry in the winter and warm and humid with seasonal winds in the summer. There is also significant rain in the summer, averaging 1,163 millimetres (45.8 in). Mokpo is usually windy and foggy in the spring and autumn due to its location near the ocean. Mokpo's long period (annual average of 223 days) without frost creates suitable conditions for rice farming. However, its seacoast location and the influence of the continental climate on the city often cause a great disparity between the rise and fall of daily and yearly temperatures. Mokpo, along with the rest of Sinan County, has the highest level of sunlight in Korea, enabling more efficient use of solar energy plants and related energy sources. The frequency of yellow dust is quite similar to that of other cities like Seoul and Incheon, occurring about 10–11 days per year.

The climate of Mokpo is a humid subtropical climate (Köppen: Cfa). Unexpected blizzards can sweep the region with strong gusts during winter, and the city experiences more than 30 days of snow, and 60 days below 0 °C (32 °F). Mokpo sometimes falls within the range of passing typhoons, and may suffer peripheral damage, including heavy precipitation during the summer and early autumn. In 2004, Typhoon Mindulle gave Mokpo a record rainfall of 64 millimetres (2.5 in) per hour.

Climate data for Mokpo (1991–2020 normals, extremes 1904–present)
Month	Jan	Feb	Mar	Apr	May	Jun	Jul	Aug	Sep	Oct	Nov	Dec	Year
Record high °C (°F)	18.0 (64.4)	20.1 (68.2)	24.9 (76.8)	28.4 (83.1)	31.0 (87.8)	34.4 (93.9)	37.0 (98.6)	37.0 (98.6)	34.9 (94.8)	32.1 (89.8)	26.5 (79.7)	20.8 (69.4)	37.0 (98.6)
Mean daily maximum °C (°F)	5.8 (42.4)	7.6 (45.7)	11.9 (53.4)	17.5 (63.5)	22.3 (72.1)	25.7 (78.3)	28.4 (83.1)	30.0 (86.0)	26.5 (79.7)	21.5 (70.7)	14.9 (58.8)	8.3 (46.9)	18.4 (65.1)
Daily mean °C (°F)	1.8 (35.2)	3.0 (37.4)	6.9 (44.4)	12.4 (54.3)	17.5 (63.5)	21.6 (70.9)	25.1 (77.2)	26.3 (79.3)	22.3 (72.1)	16.6 (61.9)	10.4 (50.7)	4.2 (39.6)	14.0 (57.2)
Mean daily minimum °C (°F)	−1.3 (29.7)	−0.6 (30.9)	2.9 (37.2)	8.2 (46.8)	13.5 (56.3)	18.5 (65.3)	22.7 (72.9)	23.5 (74.3)	19.0 (66.2)	12.7 (54.9)	6.6 (43.9)	0.7 (33.3)	10.5 (50.9)
Record low °C (°F)	−14.2 (6.4)	−12.0 (10.4)	−7.5 (18.5)	−1.4 (29.5)	3.2 (37.8)	9.8 (49.6)	14.8 (58.6)	13.7 (56.7)	8.4 (47.1)	1.0 (33.8)	−5.5 (22.1)	−11.6 (11.1)	−14.2 (6.4)
Average precipitation mm (inches)	31.8 (1.25)	36.8 (1.45)	64.9 (2.56)	80.3 (3.16)	91.3 (3.59)	150.2 (5.91)	220.7 (8.69)	209.0 (8.23)	137.7 (5.42)	58.9 (2.32)	48.9 (1.93)	37.2 (1.46)	1,167.7 (45.97)
Average precipitation days (≥ 0.1 mm)	11.0	8.9	9.0	8.7	9.4	9.8	13.2	12.4	8.9	6.2	8.6	11.1	117.2
Average snowy days	9.5	5.6	1.9	0.1	0.0	0.0	0.0	0.0	0.0	0.0	1.2	7.8	26.1
Average relative humidity (%)	70.8	70.0	69.1	69.7	73.8	79.8	85.1	81.8	77.1	70.6	69.5	70.0	73.9
Mean monthly sunshine hours	147.3	161.2	195.4	212.1	223.3	174.5	159.8	200.8	184.7	211.3	166.6	143.8	2,180.8
Percentage possible sunshine	45.7	50.1	49.6	52.3	49.9	39.5	35.8	49.1	48.2	59.7	53.5	46.8	48.0
Source: Korea Meteorological Administration (percent sunshine 1981–2010)

== Transportation ==
=== Railroad ===
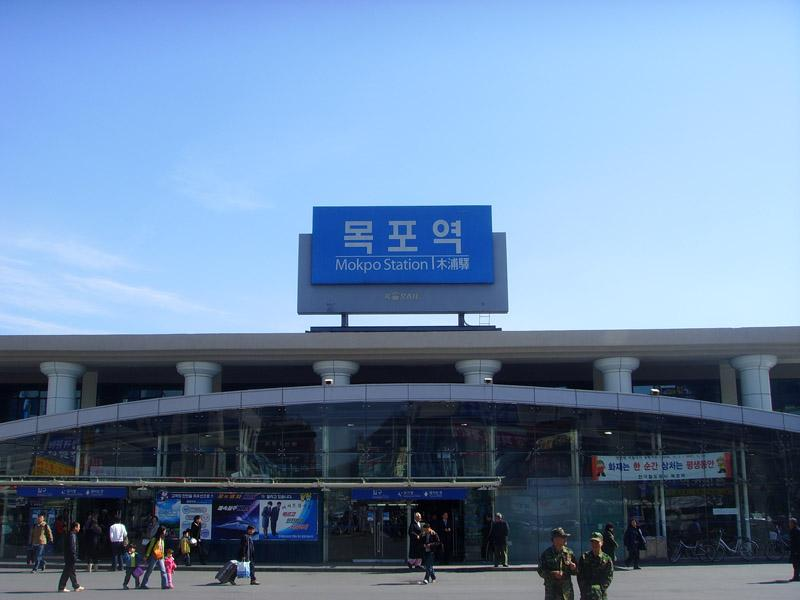
Mokpo Station

Mokpo station opened 15 May 1913, it is the final destination of Honam Line and accommodates over 1.2 million annually, as well as cargo shipments.

The station is located near the mountain Yudalsan, in the southwestern part of the city. The railroad ends inside the station, although a freight-only line continued on to Samhakdo, carrying coal for the industrial factories. Because of potential danger, the city removed the rail extension in 2011.

On 1 April 2004, Korea Train Express advertised a three-hour travel time from Seoul to Mokpo, however, the actual time was longer due to the number of stops along the Honam Line. Three-hour travel was only possible when limiting the train to four stops: Seodaejeon, Iksan, Gwangjusongjeong, and finally Mokpo. However, that service has not been available since 2008. Then, there were 10 trains from Yongsan station to Mokpo, with a travel time of 195 minutes.

Since 2015, there has been a high-speed KTX service linking Mokpo and Yongsan Station within an average of 140 minutes. Limited services also allow passengers to travel further north to Seoul Station and Haengsin station in the city of Goyang.

=== Inland road ===
The Seohaean Expressway connects Mokpo to Seoul via a 4-hour car ride. The Muan-Gwangju Expressway was opened in 2008 to ease access to the Muan International Airport. In 2012, the Mokpo to Gwangyang Highway opened, connecting the eastern and western ends of South Jeolla Province, as well as continuing on to Busan.

National Route 1 was planned to connect Mokpo to Sineuju in North Korea. After the Korean War, however, the route was cut off at Imjingak near the truce village of Panmunjeom. It was not until 2000 when Route 1 was extended to North Korea's second largest city, Gaesung.

=== Bus ===
Two companies provide most of the bus service in the local area. Since 2005, the companies and the city council agreed to expand the number of buses fueled by natural gas (NG), following a 3-year negotiation. The city agreed to assist the companies with a 21,000 US dollar per bus subsidy for each bus equipped with the NG equipment. As of 2006, 32 buses had been retrofitted with the natural gas equipment. The growing suburbs around the city created a demand for additional lines, but there is conflict between the needs of the city and the profit margin of those new lines.

Riders may transfer between buses, free of charge, beginning on 1 March 2007. The lines are classified as inner circle, outer line and artery, which follows the commuting system of Seoul Buses. Buses with a low-floor level were first deployed in South Jeolla province in 2007, although they still remain in limited service.

=== Airport ===
Muan International Airport is the airport serving Mokpo. Previously, Mokpo Airport, in Yeongam County, operated as the region's airport. The crash of Asiana Airlines Flight 733 in 1993 increased concerns about the airport, resulting in extending the runway by 100 meters. However, the site still had fundamental drawbacks due to common foggy weather and the lack of related facilities. Korean Air abolished the Gimpo-Mokpo route and Asiana Airlines started to slash services in 2004 with the removal of the Mokpo-Jeju route. The airline companies announced deficits due to the high-speed railroad.

The alternative to Mokpo Airport was Muan International Airport, whose construction was delayed for many years, leading to disappointment among the local people. Eventually, however, the airport was constructed, and Mokpo Airport closed its doors on November 9, 2007.

=== Sea ===
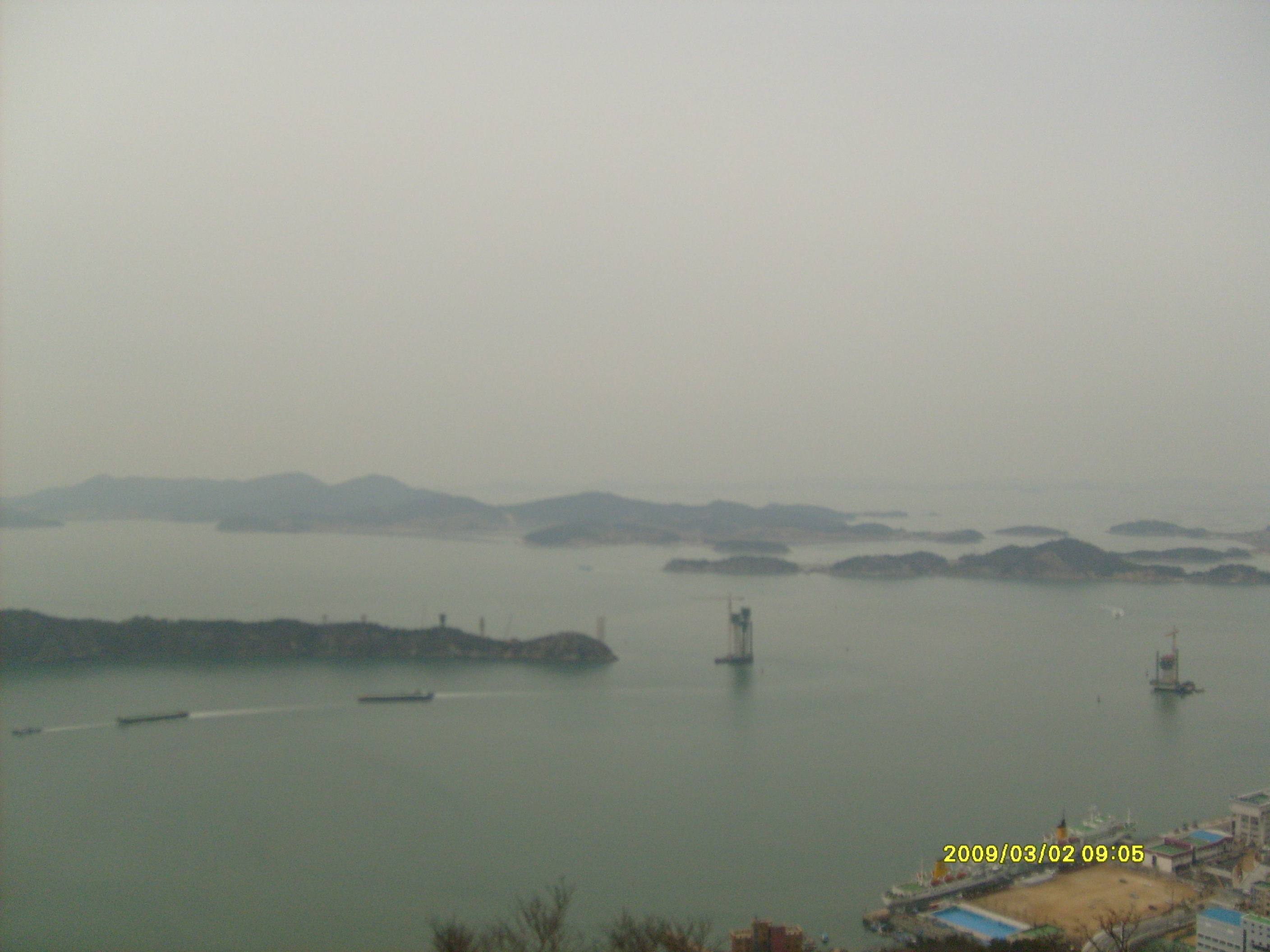
Frontal coast seen from Yudal Mountain

Mokpo has three harbors: one each for ferry service, trading and fishing. The main harbor is used to ferry customers and cargoes around nearby islands, while North harbor conducts ferry service to Nonghyup. Additionally, the newly built harbor is used for container shipping to China.

Over 80 sea-going lines have been available, notably for Heuksando, Hongdo and Jeju, as well as ferries linking Sinan county. In 2002, the first cruise-line to Shanghai was opened for operation, however, bankruptcy concerns forced the discontinuance of the cruise line after only five months. In July 2004, another attempt to start a cruise route to Shanghai, with a newly designed, smaller boat, failed due to Chinese objections.

The Mokpo coastal terminal was originally built during the 1980s, with the government beginning an update in 2003. The 30bn won, 4-story terminal opened in February 2007. Mokpo coastal terminal is currently configured to divide coastal from international travel.

The newly built harbor in Mokpo has seen a growing number of cargoes since it opened in 2004. The harbor set a record for civil investment in a seaport in South Korea. Currently, sea routes have been established for China, Japan, Thailand, and Indonesia with municipal support. In January 2011, Samsung electronics decided to choose Mokpo as their chief exporting harbor for merchandise from its factory in Gwangju.

==== Ferries at coastal terminal ====
Line	Company	Number	Remarks
Heuksando, Hongdo, Gageodo	Namhae Express/Dongyang	Twice per day	Fastsailing
Chuja-Byeokpa-Heuksan-Hongdo	Jindo Transportation	Unverified	
Jeju	Seaworld ferry	Twice per day	
Eupdong (Anjwa), Palguem, Amtae, Jaeun, Bigeum, Docho	Daeheung		Also available to depart from Aphae harbour of Sinan
Bokho (Anjwa), Jangsan, Haui, Sinui, Sangtae	Joyang		Clippery Angel
Uidal, Dali, Yuledo and other islands	Sinjin, Johang	5 times per day	11 times during seawater pool in Uidal island

==== Nonghyup ferry at North harbor ====
Depart	Arrival	Company	Remarks
North Harbor; Songgong of Aphae	Eupdong (Anjwa)	Nonghyup at Anjwa	
North Harbor; Songgong of Aphae	Gosan (Palguemdo); 5 small islands of Amtae	Sinan Nonghyup	
North Harbor	Biguem	Biguem Nonghyup	
North Harbor	Docho	Docho Nonghyup	

== Culture ==
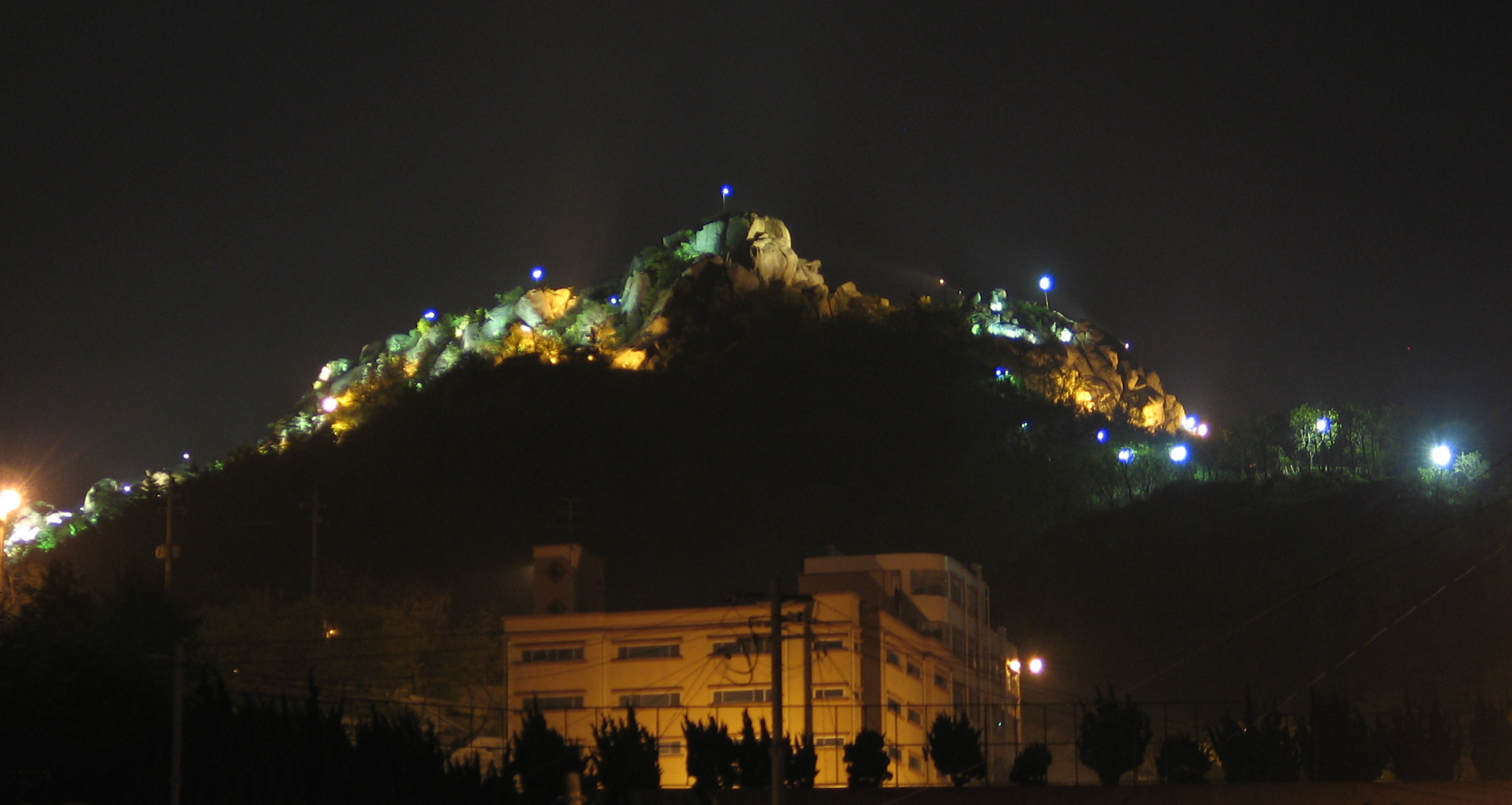
Night Sight of Mokpo

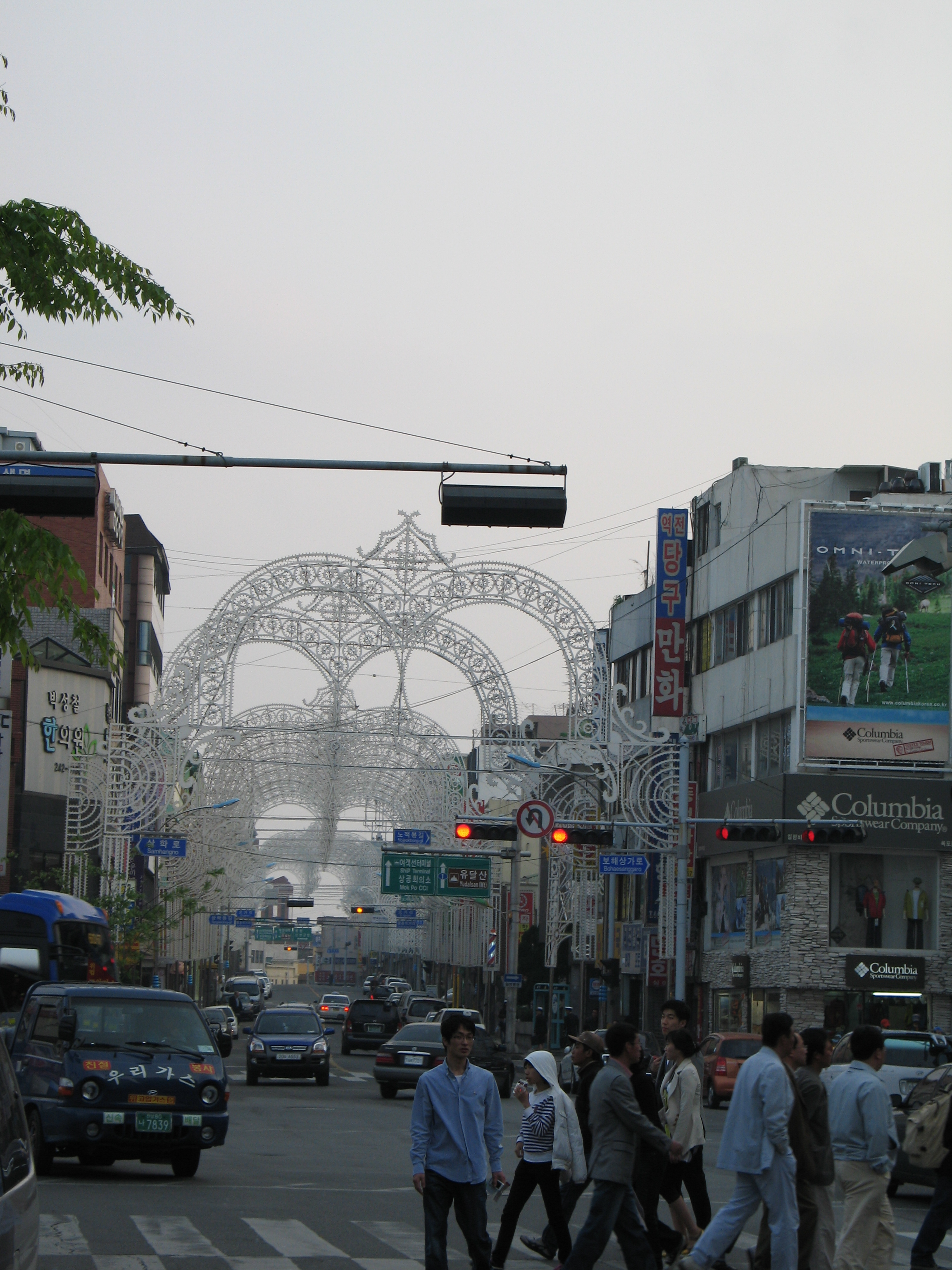
Old downtown with Luminarie

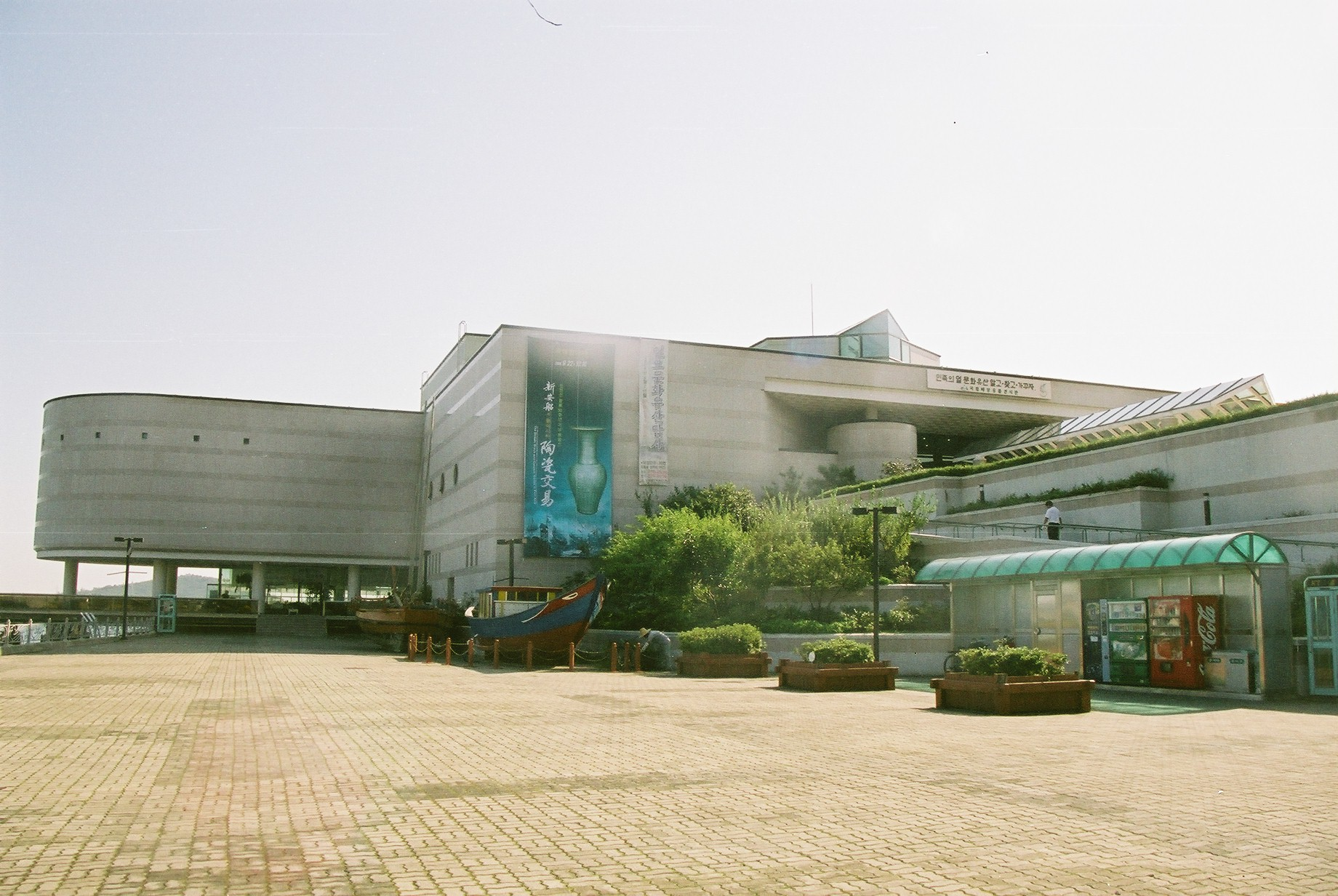
National maritime museum

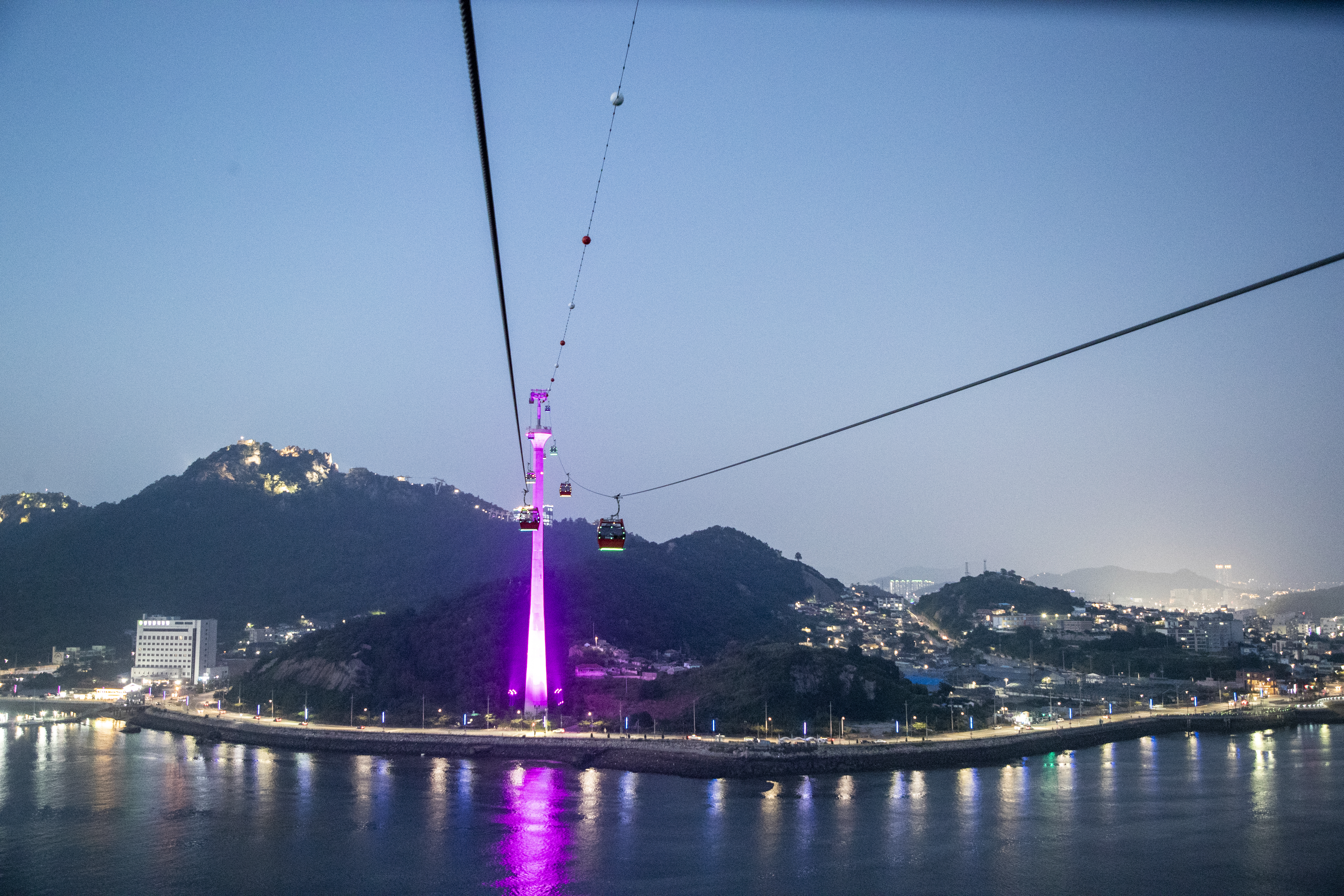
Mokpo Marine Cable Car

=== Festivals ===
A flower festival is held at Yudal mountain every April and May. The festival of Largehead Hairtail (Korean: 목포사랑은빛갈치축제) takes place around Yeongsan Lake every October. The festival is extremely popular among fishing fans and family tourists. A fishing contest is held, wherein great numbers of people take part, which is followed by a fireworks display.

The Nanyeong Singing Memorial celebrates the famous singer, Lee Nan-young, whose song, "Tears of Mokpo" gained wide popularity. The memorial was started in 1968 by the Honam Maeil newspaper but was stopped, but was restarted by MBC Mokpo and is held every autumn.

=== City of Light ===
The city has a plan for promoting tourism in the old downtown, and South Jeolla province agreed to offer support for the city's plan. This city's population decline has resulted in the closure of many shops, as well as a drastic reduction in the city's school system. For example, student enrollment at Sanjeong Elementary School has dropped to below 300 from a high of more than 3,000. The project, entitled, "A City of Light", called for establishing a light show along the street which runs next to the railway station. However, environmentalists have lodged objections, arguing that the plan will have an irrevocable impact, harming the ecological balance of the mountain.

In the new downtown area, there is now a fountain, which times its waters and light show to the beat of the song. This was to be expanded, but has confronted opposition from several civil groups since 2009.

=== Islands offshore ===
Outside of the harbor, thousands of islands dot the Yellow Sea, several of which are actually part of Mokpo. The government has promoted a program of constructing infrastructure on each island. With the slogan of "Lovely island, Uai-dal", Hanok residences on these islands, each with a saltwater pool, have served as accommodations for tourists during the summer.

One of the most famous islands, Goha-do, was used as a base for naval forces in the late 16th century when Japan invaded Joseon. The Japanese navy created artificial caves on this island to conceal armaments from the Allies during the Second World War. Two air-raid shelters have been found. The Mokpo Bridge was publicly opened in June 2012.

=== Museums ===
Many museums in Mokpo are located near Gatbawi street, due to the city concentrating its investment to exhibition space in this area. The National Maritime museum is one of the oldest museums dedicated to the Korean naval and shipping traditions. The museum changed its name in 2009 to the Research Institute for Maritime History, due to its broadened function. The Institute conducts surveys and research related to ancient ships, trade routes and relics, and is the only research institute for maritime relics in South Korea.

The Mokpo Natural History Museum has a large collection of fossils from all over the world. It originally began as a single building, but has expanded into a second building, the Cultural Heritage Hall, which specializes in local relics dating as far back as prehistoric time. The museum has an extensive collection of samples and data regarding everything from dinosaur fossils to insects and cetaceans found in the Yellow Sea. One of the most significant displays is a nest of dinosaur eggs, found on Aphae island, which was restored and opened to the public in 2010. The eggs reach lengths greater than 40 cm, and have been dated to approximately 80 million years ago, during the Mesozoic period. The Korea Forest Service chose the museum to record its samples of insects in a national database for biological resources in 2009.

Namnong Memorial Hall commemorates the famed calligrapher, Heo Gun. The Hall is situated within a Korean traditional garden and features exhibitions on different series of his works.

The Mokpo Ceramic Museum opened in 2008, was funded by the government to establish ceramics and china exhibits from notable manufacturers. Meanwhile, the Literature hall of Mokpo (Korean: 목포문학관) is not far from the ceramic museum, and hosts literature classes for the general public, featuring specific writers or novels, to promote literature among the local population.

The Mokpo Modern History Museum I, officially opened in 2014 as a museum celebrating Mokpo's history and culture over time. The museum currently features seven exhibits, framing Mokpo within Korea's broader colonial history and touching on themes like resistance against Japanese colonial rule, the spread of foreign culture, and the development of pop culture, among others. The museum is housed in the former Japanese consulate and administrative center used during the Japanese colonial period, which was built in 1900 in order to serve the growing Japanese population in the city. The building was also used as Mokpo's city hall immediately following Korea's liberation until 1974 and as a municipal library until it became a cultural center in 1990. Additionally, the building was named a historic cultural heritage site in 1981, with the Korea Heritage Service describing it as "one of the positive remnants of Japanese rule which can remind us of the lessons of our history."

Mokpo Modern History Museum II is located in the former Mokpo branch of the Japanese colonial-era Oriental Development Company. Built in 1920 in a neoclassical style, the building reflects Japan's efforts to modernize and control Korea's economy through land acquisition and settlement. After liberation, the building was used by the Korean Navy until 1989. It was restored and reopened as a museum in 2006 by the Mokpo city government. Today, it exhibits materials on colonial development, local resistance, and daily life in 1920s Mokpo.

=== Cuisine ===
Being located close to the sea, the city's cuisine is characterized by seafood dishes. Mokpo is famous for hongeo-hoe (Korean: 홍어회), a strong smelling fermented dish featuring the skate, a kind of ray fish. Other delicacies of Mokpo are: kimchi and pyeonyuk (Korean: 홍어삼합); a variant of yeonpo-tang containing long arm octopus; hoe; and seasoned Portunus trituberculatus. The city started a public market for vendors selling their own delicacies, located downtown.

Cuisine
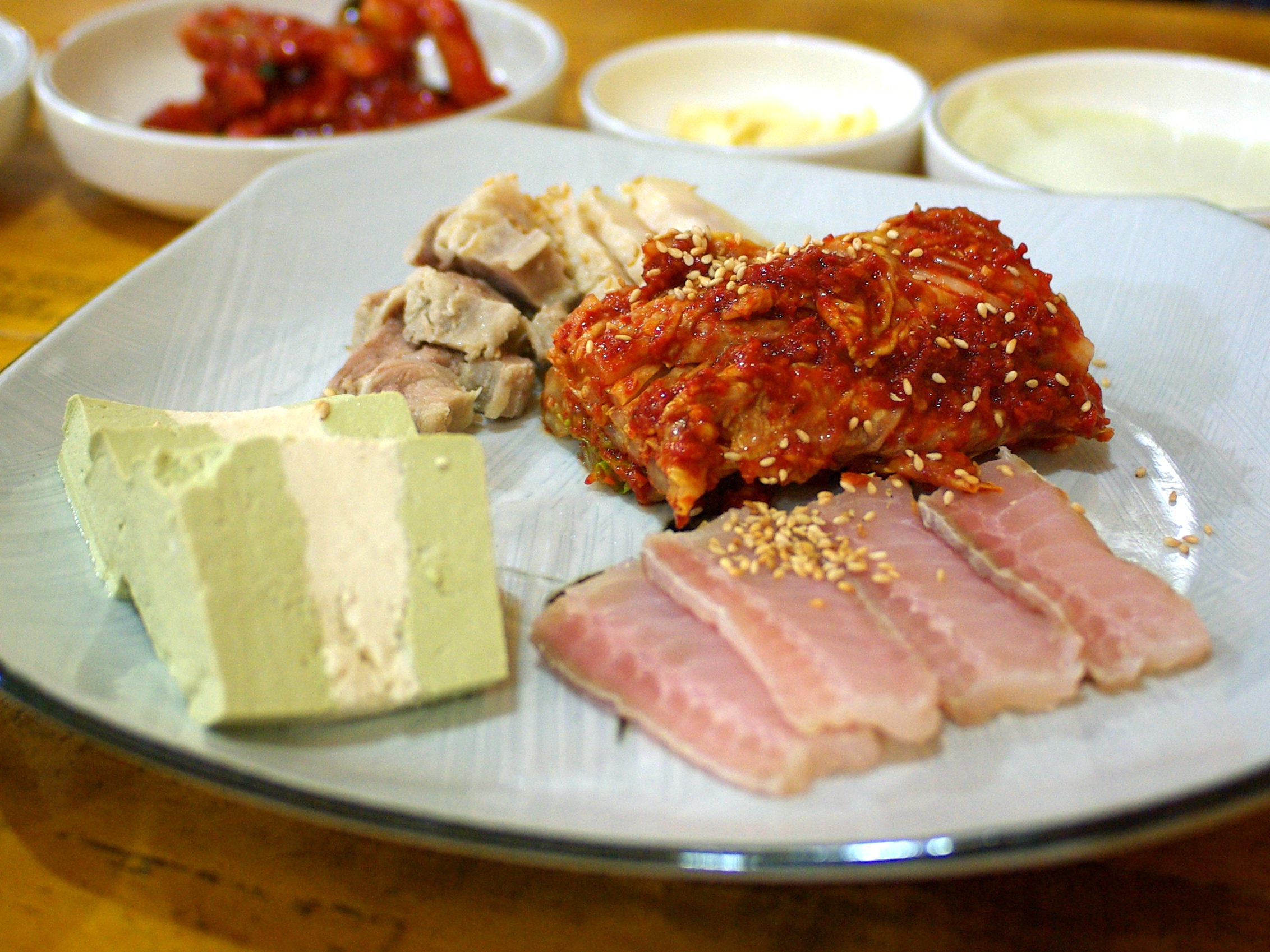
Hongeo-hoe

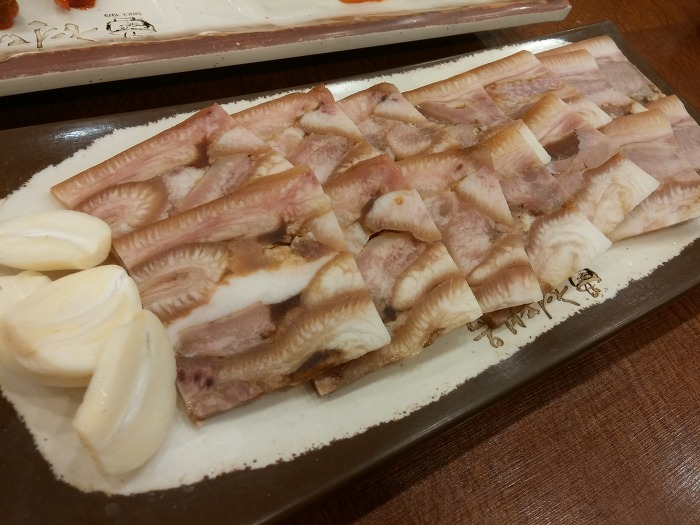
Pyeonyuk

=== Facilities for sports and cultural entertainment ===
Yudal Stadium is located next to the 100 Year Memorial Avenue. The stadium consists of ballpark and an eight lane track. Behind the stadium, local groups are able to use public tennis courts. The ground floor of the stadium houses committees of diverse sports.

The city has attracted many athletes to train in the area during the winter, due to sunny and warm weather, and numerous accommodations. The city has been very successful in reaching agreements with 127 teams, totaling almost 6,000 athletes, who trained during the winter in 2004. Since 2005, the focus has been on track and field sports to boost the number of visiting athletes.

Recreational parks are located sparsely around Yudal mountain, while the city is in the process of constructing an additional park in the Samhakdo area.

The Mokpo Cultural Complex is located along the shore near Gatbawi, consisting of two buildings, one for performance and the other for exhibition. However, the complex is limited by its seating capacity: a maximum of 700 people for the two-story building.

The Mokpo Civil Culture & Sports Center was built in 2003 to meet the needs of the increasing population in the downtown area. However, the operating fees have proven a burden to the province. It consists of three halls, with a capacity of more than 1,200 people.

There are two libraries in Mokpo. The Civil Library of Mokpo opened in 1974 at the old consulate of Japan. In 1989, it moved closer to Yudal stadium, and consists of 4 stories, with 1,636 seats. The library is home to over 360,000 books, as well as having internet-access research rooms. The Public Library of Mokpo is located near North Harbor. It began as part of the Mokpo Educational Institute, but has since gained independence.

=== Tourism ===
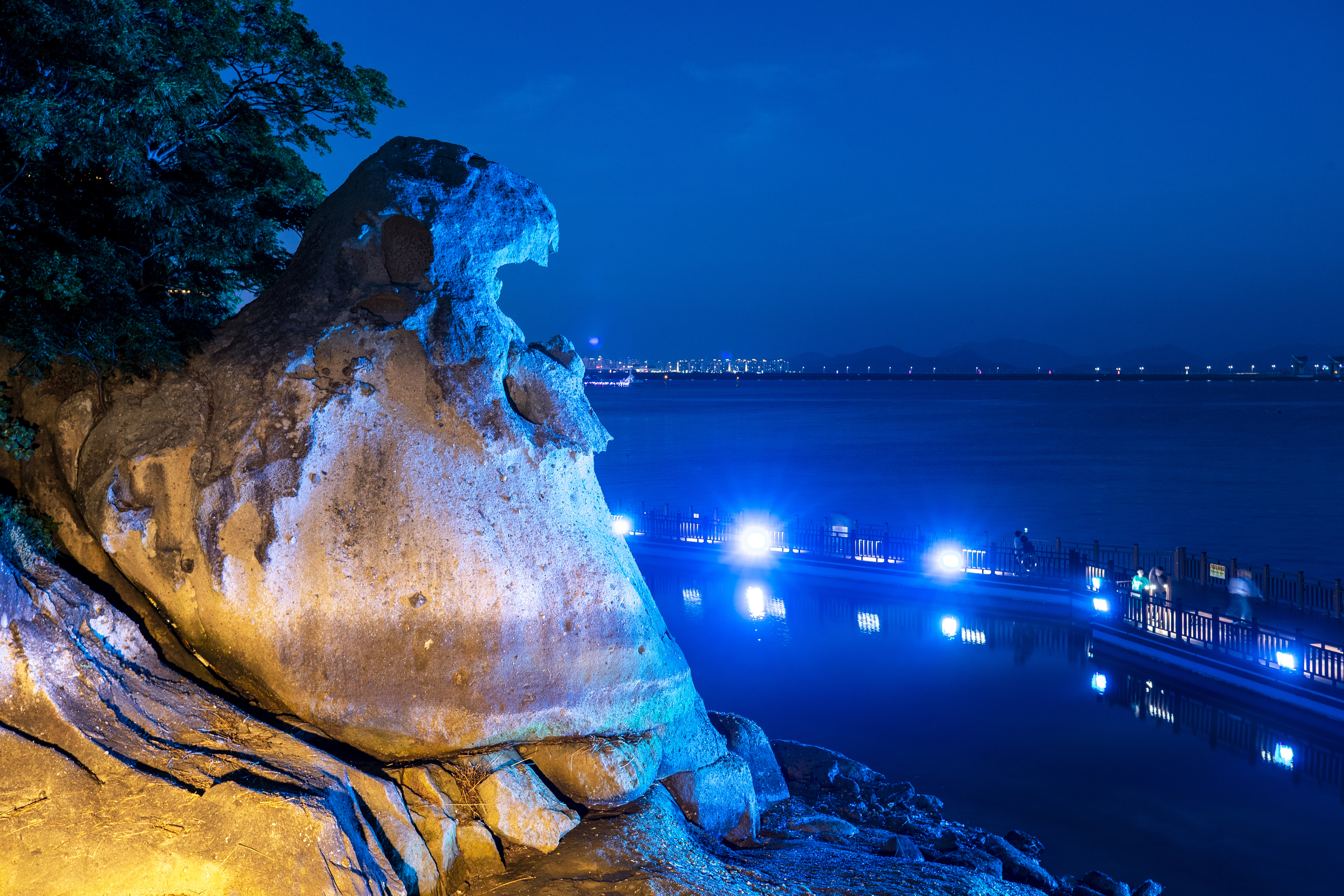
Gatbawi (Mokpo)

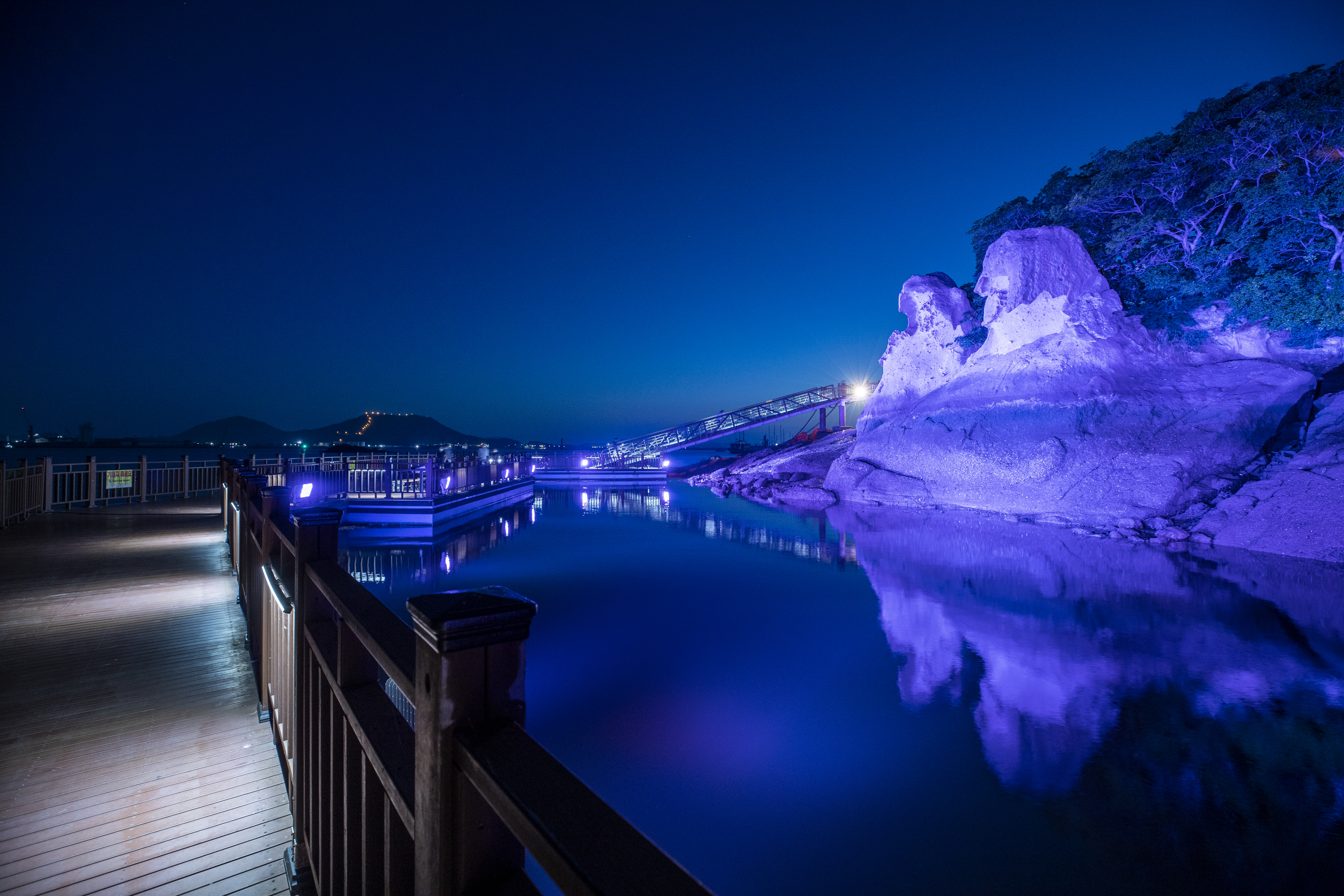
Gatbawi (Mokpo)

Gatbawi is a natural Sandstone and Tafoni formation found on the shore of Mokpo's east harbor, near the mouth of the Yeongsan River.

== Media ==
Branch offices of KBS and MBC exist in Mokpo. KBS Mokpo was established in 1942, at a location close to the Yeon dong area, prior to its move next to the current city hall in Yongdang. MBC Mokpo was initially planned as a radio station when it opened in 1967, using a frequency of 1386 kHz.

FEBC Mokpo opened an office in 1999, for Christian missions around the Honam area. For cable broadcasting, Honam Hanguk cable has its office in Hadang.

South of Mokpo at 34.679364 N 126.445148 E, there is a VLF-transmitter with two very tall masts ( height unknown).

== Notable people from Mokpo ==
- Hyginus Kim Hee-jong (born 21 January 1947), the 5th Archbishop of Gwangju (Korean: 김희중)
- Seo Su-yeon (born 8 January 1986), South Korean para table tennis player (Korean: 서수연)
- Kim Bo-mi (born 7 October 1985), South Korean field hockey player (Korean: 김보미)
- Eun Mihee (born 20 September 1960), South Korean novelist, writer, columnist, and college lecturer (Korean: 은미희)
- Choi Jin-hyuk (born 9 February 1986), South Korean actor (Real Name: Kim Tae-ho, 김태호)
- Jung Man-sik (born 11 December 1974), South Korean actor (Korean: 정만식)
- Kim Kyung-ho (born 7 June 1971), South Korean singer and rock star (Korean: 김경호)
- Soon-Tek Oh (1932–2018), Korean–American actor (Korean: 오순택)
- Park Na-rae (born 25 October 1985), South Korean comedian (Korean: 박나래)
- Lee Nan-young (1916–1965), South Korean singer and actress (Korean: 이난영)
- Nam Jin (born 27 September 1946), South Korean trot singer (Real Name: Kim Nam-jin, 김남진)
- Donghae (born 15 October 1986), singer-songwriter, rapper, dancer, model, producer, actor, businessman and K-pop idol, member of K-pop boygroup Super Junior and its subgroups Super Junior-D&E and Super Junior-M (Real Name: Lee Dong-hae, 이동해)
- Youngjae (born 17 September 1996), singer, dancer, actor, radio DJ, songwriter, producer and K-pop idol, member of K-pop boygroup Got7 (Real Name: Choi Young-jae, 최영재)
- Zelo (born 15 October 1996), singer, rapper, dancer, model, beatboxer and K-pop idol, former member of K-pop boygroup B.A.P (Real Name: Choi Jun-hong, 최준홍)
- Oh Ji-ho (born 14 April 1976), a South Korean actor. (Korean: 오지호)

== Health care ==
As of 2008, the number of doctors per capita was 11.41 per thousand, increasing from 10.45 of the prior year. The council of doctors in Mokpo has stated that the ongoing economic improvement, as well as the growing populations, will cause the need for the construction of middle-sized or larger hospitals and clinics.

Mokpo National hospital was established in 1962, specifically for the treatment of tuberculosis. Originally a city hospital, the state took over operations in 2002.

The ministry of Health chose Mokpo and Incheon as a sites for operating medical helicopters. Hankook hospital was officially designated the location for these emergency services.

Public medical institute

- Mokpo Medical Center
- Mokpo National Hospital

General hospital

- Hankook Hospital
- Dongshin University Oriental Hospital
- Mokpo Christian Hospital
- Joongang Hospital
- Mokpo Miz-i Hospital
- Mokpo MIR Dental Hospital

== Sister cities ==
- Beppu, Ōita, Japan (1984.10.01)
- Hammerfest, Norway (1962.03.23)
- Lianyungang, Jiangsu, China (1992.11.01)
- Changwon, South Korea (1998.12.24)
- Seodaemun District, Seoul (2005.04.18)
- Xiamen, Fujian, China (2007.07.25)
- Jeonju, South Korea (2020.08.15)

== Symbols of Mokpo ==
- City Flower – White Magnolia
- City Tree – Loquats
- City Bird – Crane

== Images ==
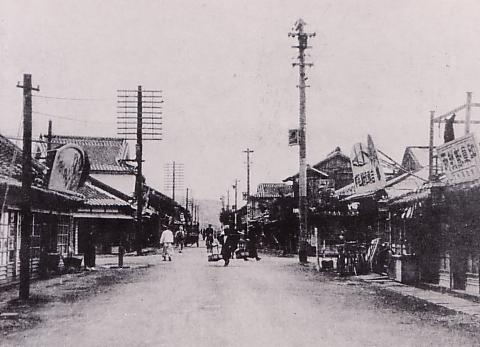
Bokman neighbourhood during Korea under Japanese rule's period.

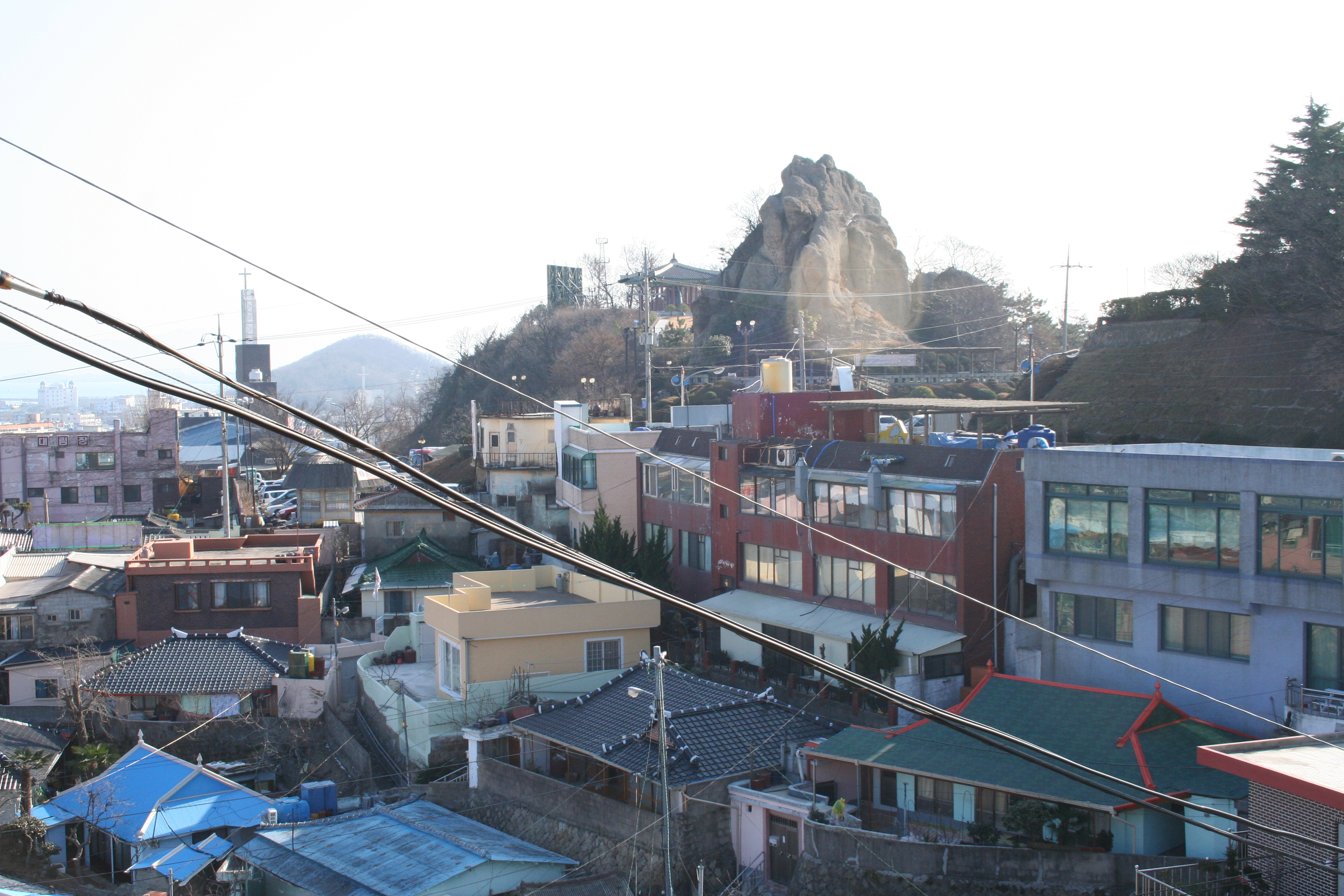
Residential area in Mokpo

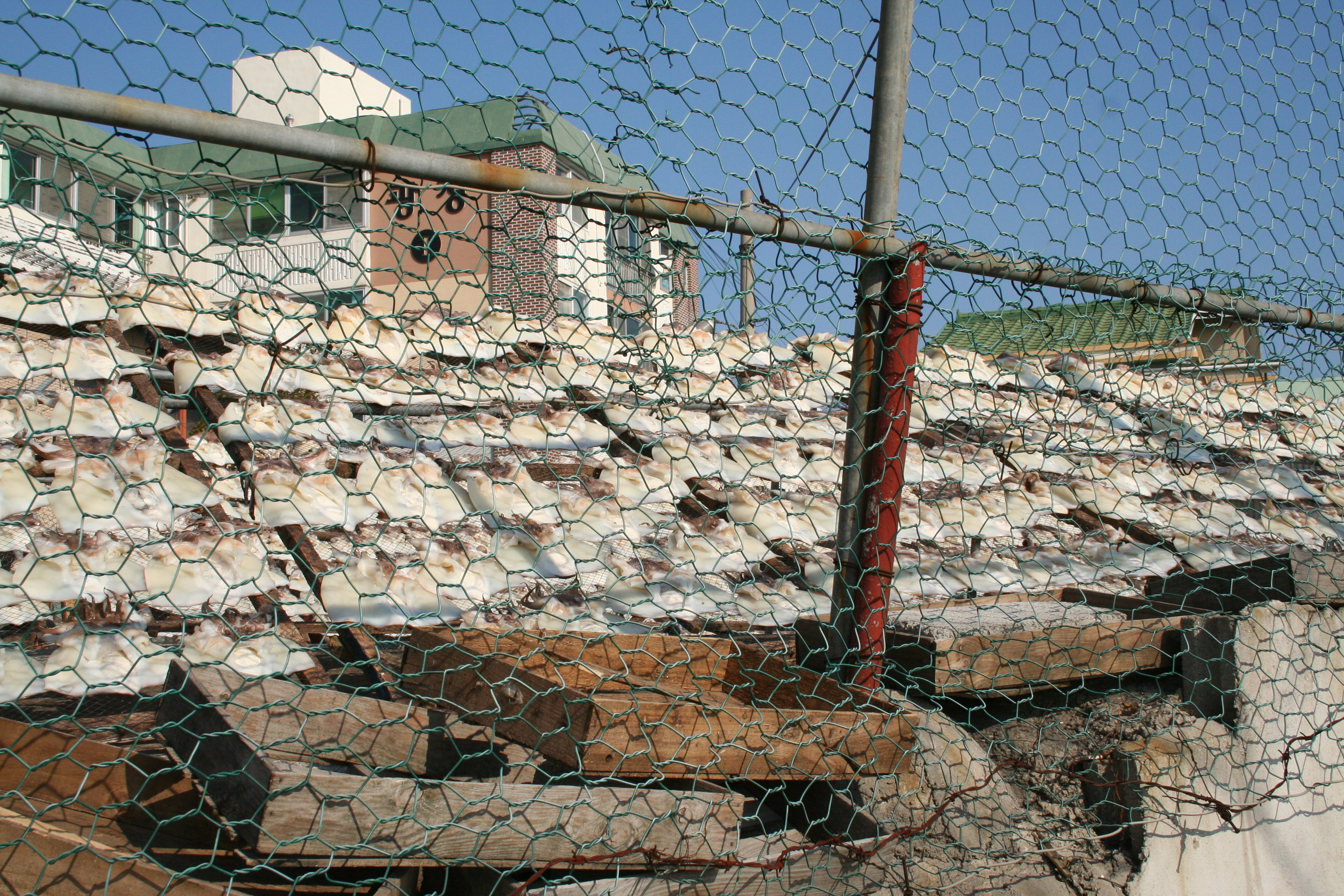
Squid out to dry

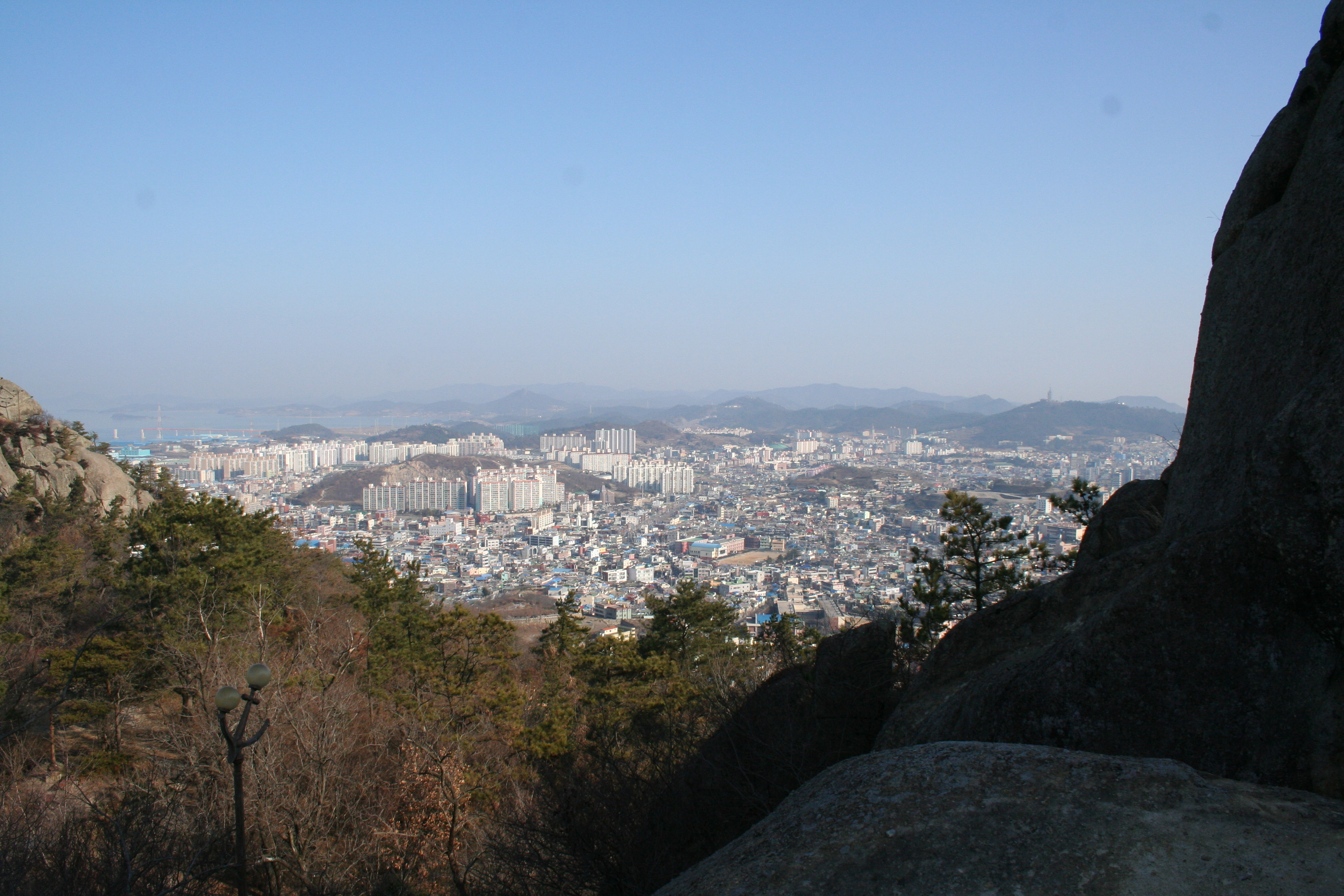
View of Mokpo from Yudalsan

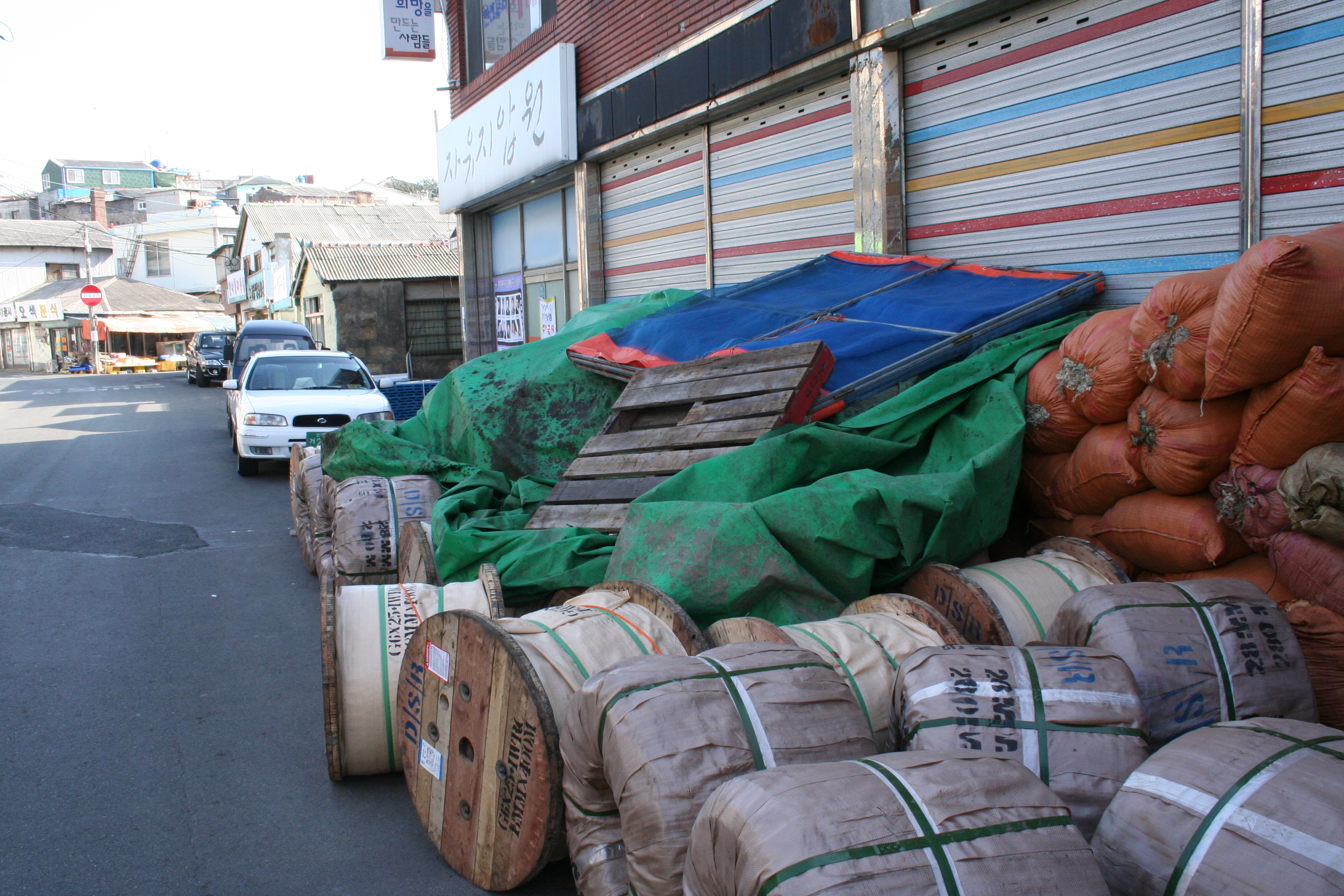
Street in Mokpo

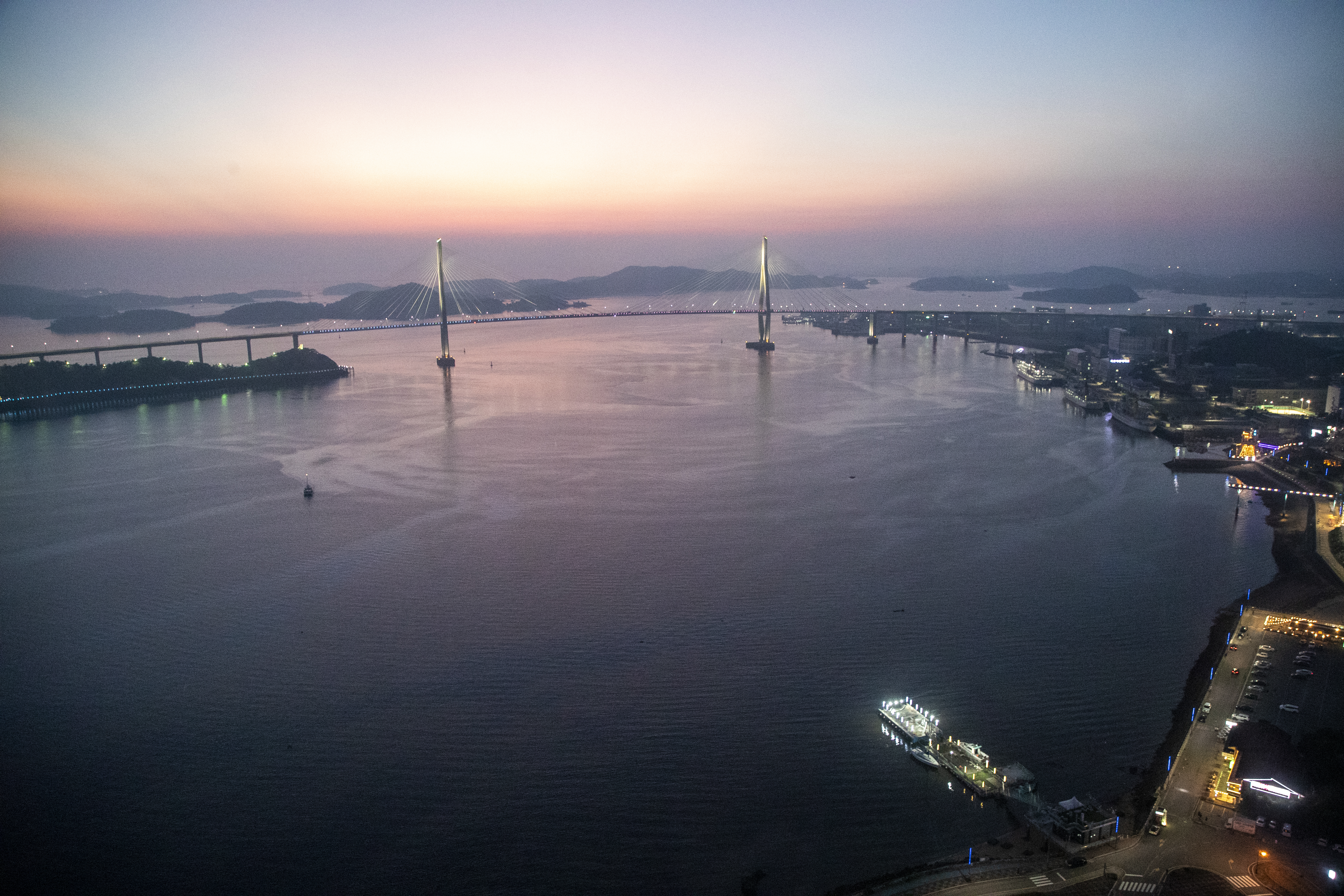
Mokpo Marine Cable Car

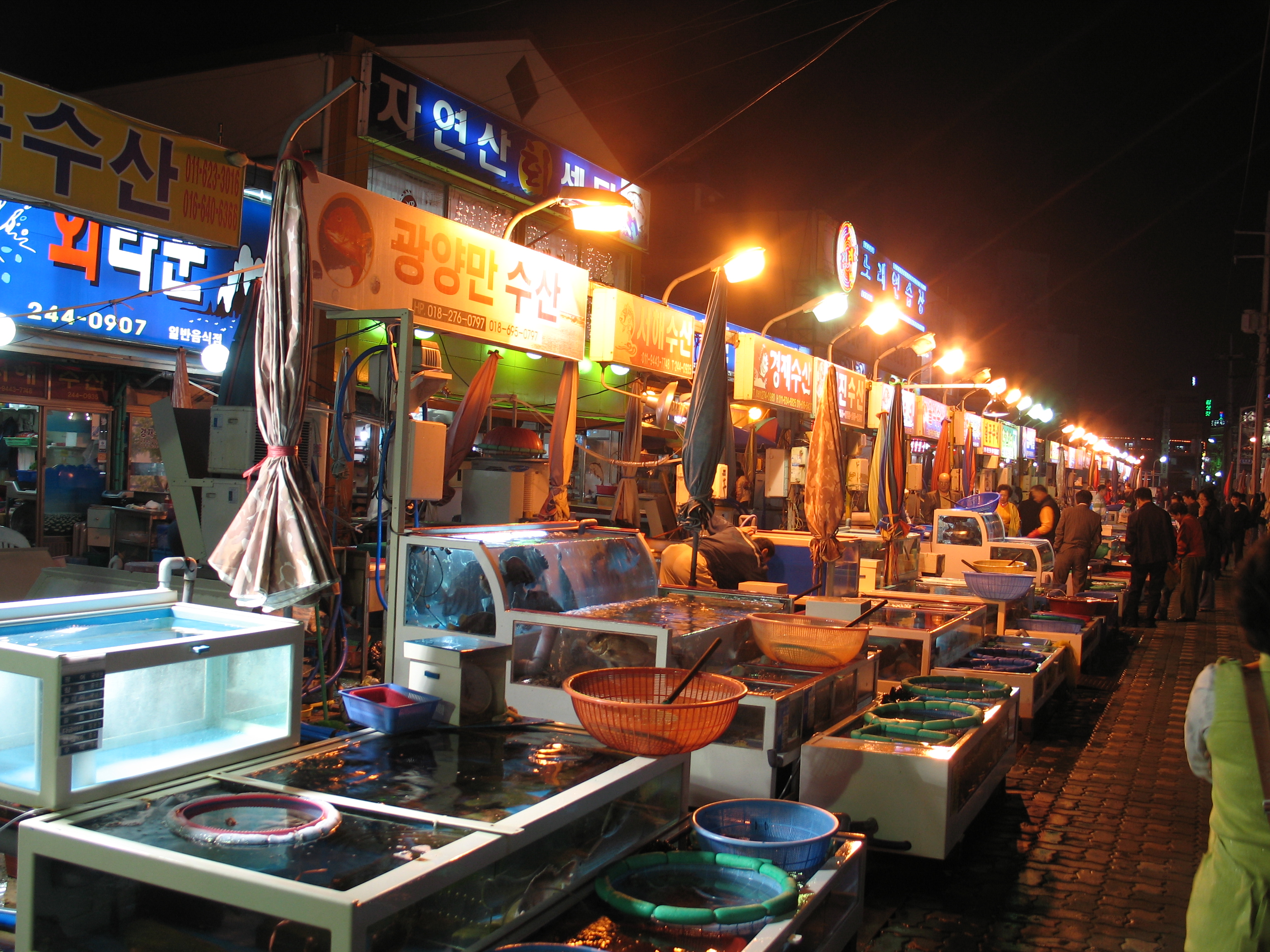
Hoe center at North Harbor

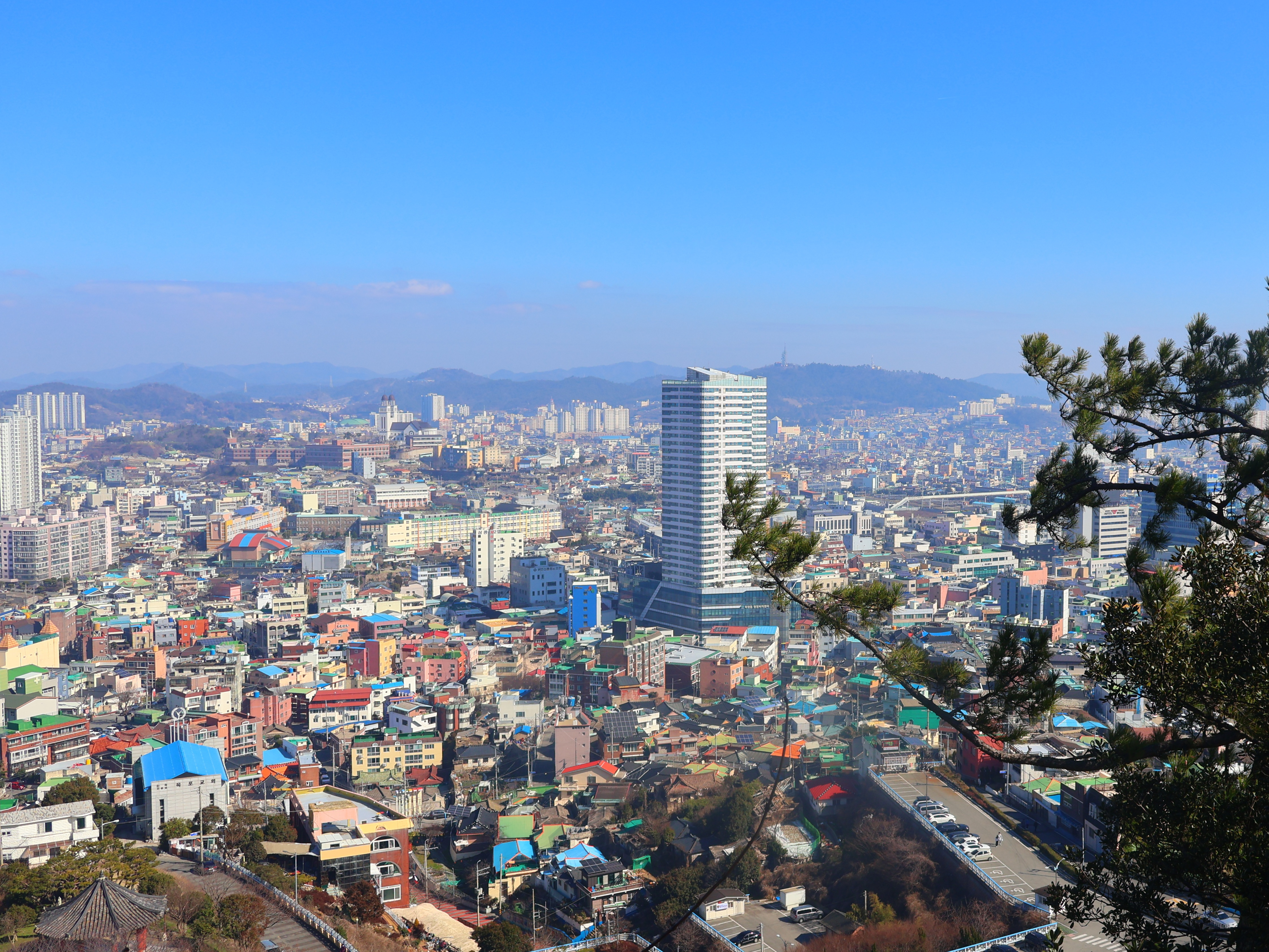
A view of Mokpo

== See also ==
- List of cities in South Korea
- Geography of South Korea

== Notes ==
- Two Jeolla provinces which Mokpo pertains to have been the critical base of the Democratic Party of South Korea. Before former president Kim took the presidency, he caught the strongest power in the reason as a root of his political supporting base. In this context, Mokpo and near area has been called the garden of Democrats.
- Nonghyup ferries refer to the regular ferry operated by Nonghyup which is kind of banking and cooperating organ for farmers. The ferry connects each branch in several islands in Sinan and Mokpo.
