= Lee Nan-young =

Korean singer and actress (1916–1965)

Lee Nan-young 이난영(李蘭影)
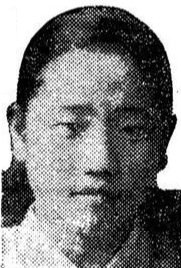
- Lee in 1935

Background information
- Also known as: Ranko Oka(岡 蘭子)
- Born: Lee Ok-rye (이옥례; 李玉禮); Lee Ok-sun (이옥순; 李玉順); June 6, 1916; Mokpo, Korea, Empire of Japan
- Died: April 11, 1965 (aged 48) Seoul, South Korea
- Genre: Trot
- Occupations: Singer; actress

Lee Nan-young (Korean: 이난영; June 6, 1916 – April 11, 1965) was a Korean singer and actress most famous for the 1935 hit trot song "Tears of Mokpo", which sold 50,000 copies.

== Biography ==
Lee was born in Mokpo, Zenranan Province, Korea, Empire of Japan. Her name at birth was Lee Ok-soon (이옥순), but it was later changed to Lee Ok-rye (이옥례). Her father's name was Lee Nam-soon (이남순) and she had a brother, Lee Bong-ryong, who was a composer. She had a difficult childhood and did not graduate from school. She became an actress in 1930, and debuted as a singer under OK Records in 1932, with the stage name Lee Nan-young. She was also a member of Jeogori Sisters, considered to be Korea's first girl group. She was the original singer of "Tears of Mokpo," one of the hit songs in the history of Korean popular songs.

== Personal life ==
She married Kim Hae-song, a singer, composer and a conductor, in 1937. The couple had seven children, including Sook-ja Kim and Ai-ja Kim of The Kim Sisters. During the Korean War, the family lost their home in the bombing, and Kim Hae-song was captured and killed by the North Korean army. To earn money, Lee and her children sang for the American troops. She later performed in Busan nightclubs with her oldest daughters, Young-ja and Sook-ja.

She died in 1965 in Seoul, and is buried in Lee Nan-young Park in Samhakdo, Mokpo.

== In popular culture ==
- Portrayed by Cha Ji-yeon in the 2016 film Love, Lies.
