= Reverse weathering =

Formation of authigenic clay minerals

Reverse weathering generally refers to a process of clay neoformation consuming cations and alkalinity in a way unrelated to the weathering of silicates. More specifically reverse weathering refers to the formation of authigenic clay minerals from the reaction of 1) biogenic silica with aqueous cations or cation-bearing oxides or 2) cation poor precursor clays with dissolved cations or cation-bearing oxides.

The reverse weathering process can involve many different anions and cations, but can be summarised in the following simplified reaction:

Biogenic silica (SiO_{2}) + metal hydroxides (Al(OH)_{4}^{−}) + dissolved cations (K^{+}, Mg^{2+}, Li^{+}, etc.) + bicarbonate (HCO_{3}^{−}) → clay minerals + H_{2}O + CO_{2}

The formation of authigenic clay minerals by reverse weathering is not fully understood. Much of the research done has been conducted in localized areas, such as the Amazon Delta, Mississippi Delta, a palaeo-delta in Aínsa-Sobrarbe (Pyrenees) and in the Ethiopian Rift lakes, making a global understanding of the process difficult. Much of the driving force behind research into reverse weathering stems from constraining the chemical mass balance between rivers and oceans. Prior to the discovery of reverse weathering, the model of the chemical mass balance of the ocean predicted higher alkali metal and bicarbonate (HCO_{3}^{−}) concentrations than was observed. The formation of authigenic clay minerals was initially thought to account for the entirety of this excess, but the discovery of hydrothermal vents challenged this, as removal of alkali-alkaline earth metals and HCO_{3}^{−} from the ocean occurs in these locations as well.

== Methods of analysis ==
The process and extent of reverse weathering has been inferred by several methods and proxies.

In-situ measurements of biogenic silica and silicic acid (a product of weathering) have been used to analyze the rate and extent that reverse weathering occurs within an aquatic system. Uptake of biogenic silica as a result of reverse weathering would be observed as a relative low concentration of dissolved SiO_{2} compared to the overlying water.

Laboratory observations of reverse weathering have been conducted using incubations and flow through reactors to measure opal dissolution rates The clay was studied using scanning electron microscopes, x-ray, and transmission electron microscopes. It was observed that the clay formed quickly, and using this amount of time and the known content of the sediment, concentration of potassium ions consumed by this process in rivers around the globe was estimated.

Laboratory experiments can also include incubation experiments, in which sediment samples obtained from natural environments are enclosed in sealable containers with varied concentrations reverse weathering reactants (biogenic silica in the form of diatoms, cations, metals, etc.).

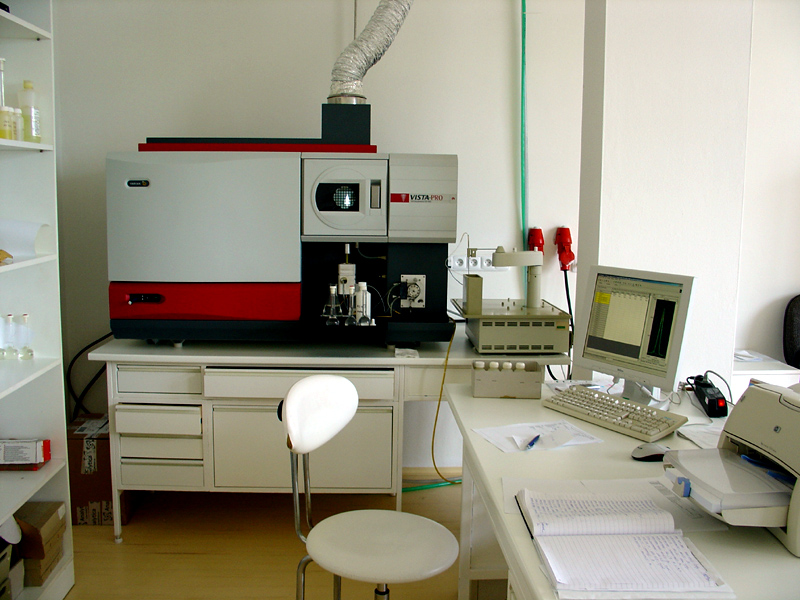
ICP-OES Instrument

Using an inductively coupled plasma optical emission spectrometer (ICP-OES) also provides concentration and isotopic information for cation and silica concentrations in pore water and digested sediment samples. Utilization of a multi-collector inductively coupled plasma mass spectrometer (MC-ICP-MS) is also used as a means of obtaining isotopic data of metals and silica in solution.

Lithium isotope concentration within planktonic foraminifera has been used to infer past changes in silicate and reverse weathering rates over the last 68 million years. Removal of lithium from seawater is mainly dependent on its assimilation within marine sediments and variations are believed to be indicative of the relative rates of silicate weathering and reverse weathering, in addition to other factors. Foraminifera with low lithium content suggest that reverse weathering may have been more prominent during that time period.

== Controls ==
=== Thermodynamics ===
Formation of authigenic silicate clays through reverse weathering was shown to be thermodynamically favorable during studies of Amazon delta sediments. Primary controls on the formation of authigenic silicate clays are on the supply of reactants in solution. Areas of limited biogenic opal, metal hydroxides (e.g. aluminate (Al(OH)_{4}^{−})), or dissolved cations limit production of authigenic silicate clays. Metals, cations, and silica are largely supplied by the weathering of terrigenous materials, which influences the thermodynamic favorability of reverse weathering.

=== Kinetics ===
Kinetically, formation of clay minerals by reverse weathering can be relatively rapid (<1 year). Due to the short formation timescale, reverse weathering is seen as a reasonable contributor to various ocean biogeochemical cycles.

== Influence on global cycles ==
Carbon cycle

=== The carbon cycle ===
The process of creating authigenic clay minerals through reverse weathering releases carbon dioxide (CO_{2}). However, release of bicarbonate by silicate weathering exceeds the quantities of CO_{2} produced by reverse weathering. Therefore, while reverse weathering does increase CO_{2} during production of authigenic clay minerals, it is overwhelmed by the concentration of HCO_{3}^{−} in the system, and will not have a significant effect on local pH.

Basic diagram of the marine silica cycle, adapted from Treguer et al., 1995

=== The silica cycle ===
In recent years, the effect of reverse weathering on biogenic silica has been of great interest in quantifying the silica cycle. During weathering, dissolved silica is delivered to oceans through glacial runoff and riverine inputs. This dissolved silica is taken up by a multitude of marine organisms, such as diatoms, and is used to create protective shells. When these organisms die, they sink through the water column. Without active production of biogenic SiO_{2}, the mineral begins diagenesis. Conversion of this dissolved silica into authigenic silicate clays through the process of reverse weathering constitutes a removal of 20-25% of silicon input.

Reverse weathering is often found to occur in river deltas as these systems have high sediment accumulation rates and are observed to undergo rapid diagenesis. The formation of silicate clays removes reactive silica from the pore waters of sediment, increasing the concentration of silica found in the rocks that form in these locations.

Silicate weathering also appears to be a dominant process in deeper methanogenic sediments, whereas reverse weathering is more common in surface sediments, but still occurs at a lower rate.

== Study locations ==
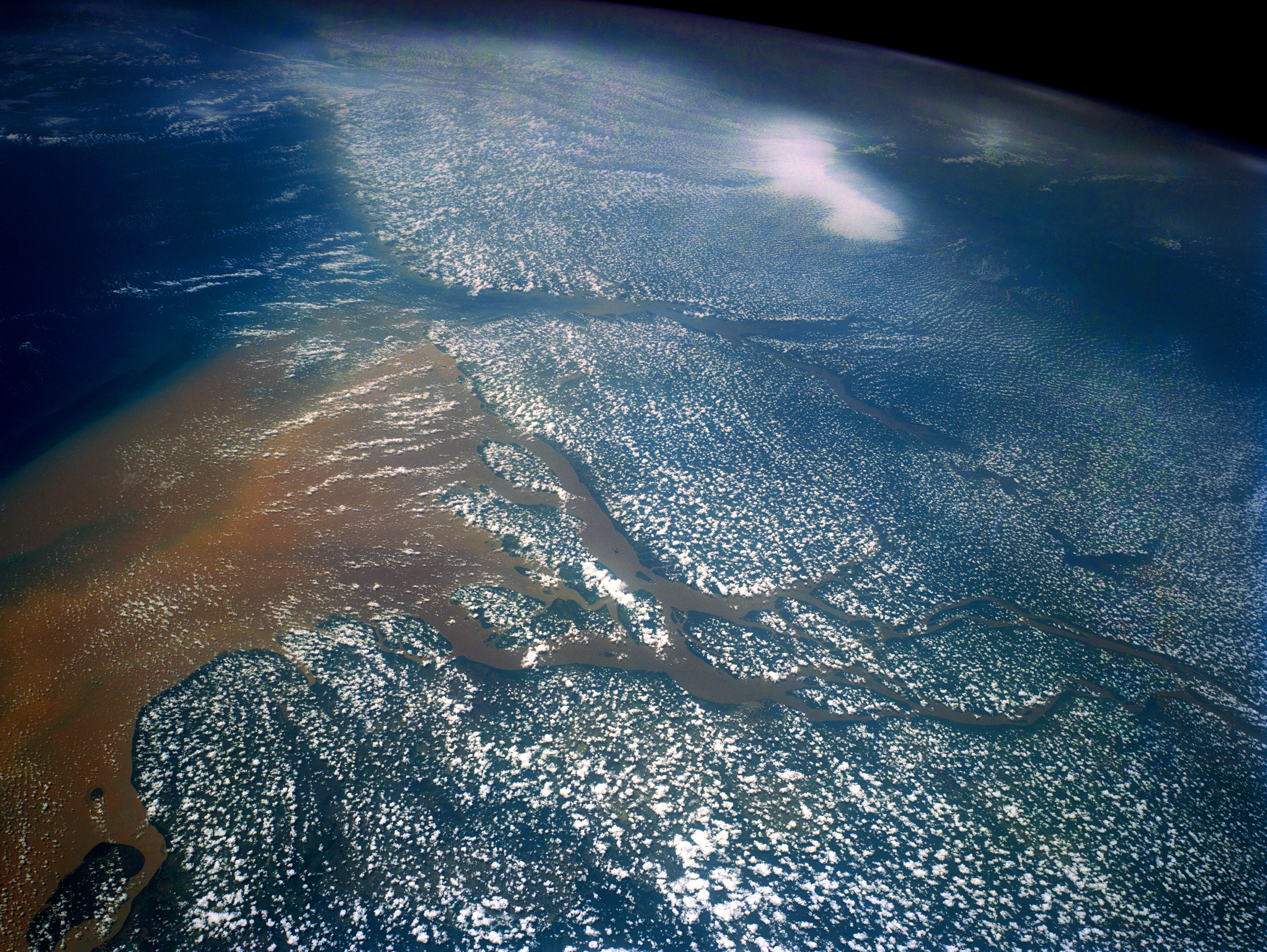
The Amazon River Delta

=== Deltas ===
In the Amazon River delta, about 90% of buried SiO_{2} is used up during reverse weathering, while the creation of potassium ions in this location is about 2.8 μmol g^{−1} year^{−1}. Nearly 7-10% of the potassium input from the Amazon River is removed from the ocean by the formation of potassium-iron rich aluminosilicates. In the Mississippi River delta about 40% of SiO_{2} that is buried in the sediment is converted to authigenic aluminosilicates. The major difference in the two deltas is due to the sediments in the Amazon delta being subject to a number of erosional and depositional processes, which creates an abundant amount of iron oxides. Sediment typically resides in the region for 30 years on average, but the upper layer undergoes major physical reworking 1-2 times per year. Pore water data suggests that the formation of authigenic clays in the Amazon delta occur on the order of a few months to a few years. The limiting reactant of clay formation in this region is the quantity of available SiO_{2,} since the river water generally has a high concentration of other reactants, such as iron, potassium, magnesium, and aluminium. Whereas in the Mississippi delta, the limiting nutrient for these reactions is iron.

The effect of reverse weathering has also been observed in paleo-delta systems. In the Ainsa basin, a palaeo-deltaic system was formed during the Eocene and uplifted through the orogeny of the Pyrenees. Isotopic geochemical differences were observed between palaeo sediments deposited in the marine conditions and those from alluvial environments. The lithium isotope signature (δ^{7}Li) and the silicon isotope signature (δ^{30}Si) are systematically lighter in marine sediments than that in alluvial sediments, implying authigenic clay formation in the marine sediments. Additionally, in the marine sediments the δ^{7}Li signature is correlated to iron contents, suggesting the coupling of iron diagenesis and reverse weathering processes in the marine environments. This coupling can be achieved in reduced environments through the following reactions:

H_{4}SiO_{4} + Fe^{2+} + 2 HCO_{3}^{–} → FeO-SiO_{2} (Fe-rich clays) + 3 H_{2}O + 2 CO_{2}

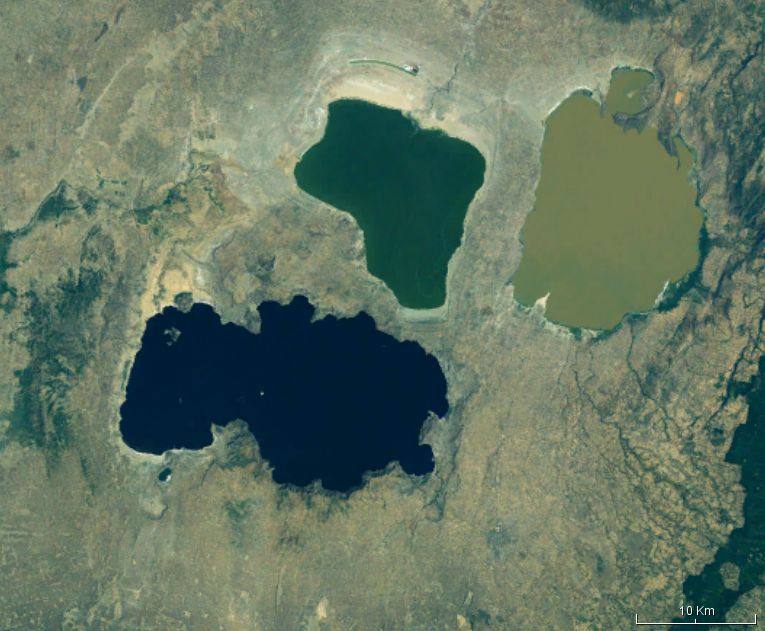
Ethiopian Rift Valley Lakes

=== Ethiopian rift lakes ===
Reverse weathering in the Ethiopian Rift lakes is easily observable, and recent studies at this location have been used to make inference on the extent of the process in the ocean. One study suggests that there is a general alkalinity deficit in the lakes, and that a little over half of this deficit can be attributed to the formation of aluminosilicate minerals. The precipitation of salts is not profound, making the development of these clay minerals by reverse weathering more readily observable in comparison to the ocean. Using clay formation rates in the Ethiopian Rift lakes as a basis, the study suggests that clay formation in the ocean is too high to entirely attribute to the process of reverse weathering. It is believed that the deep-sea reverse weathering process never reaches completion, as pH is generally low. Hydrothermal activity is suggested to be a major contributor to clay formation in the deep ocean.

=== Hydrothermal vents ===
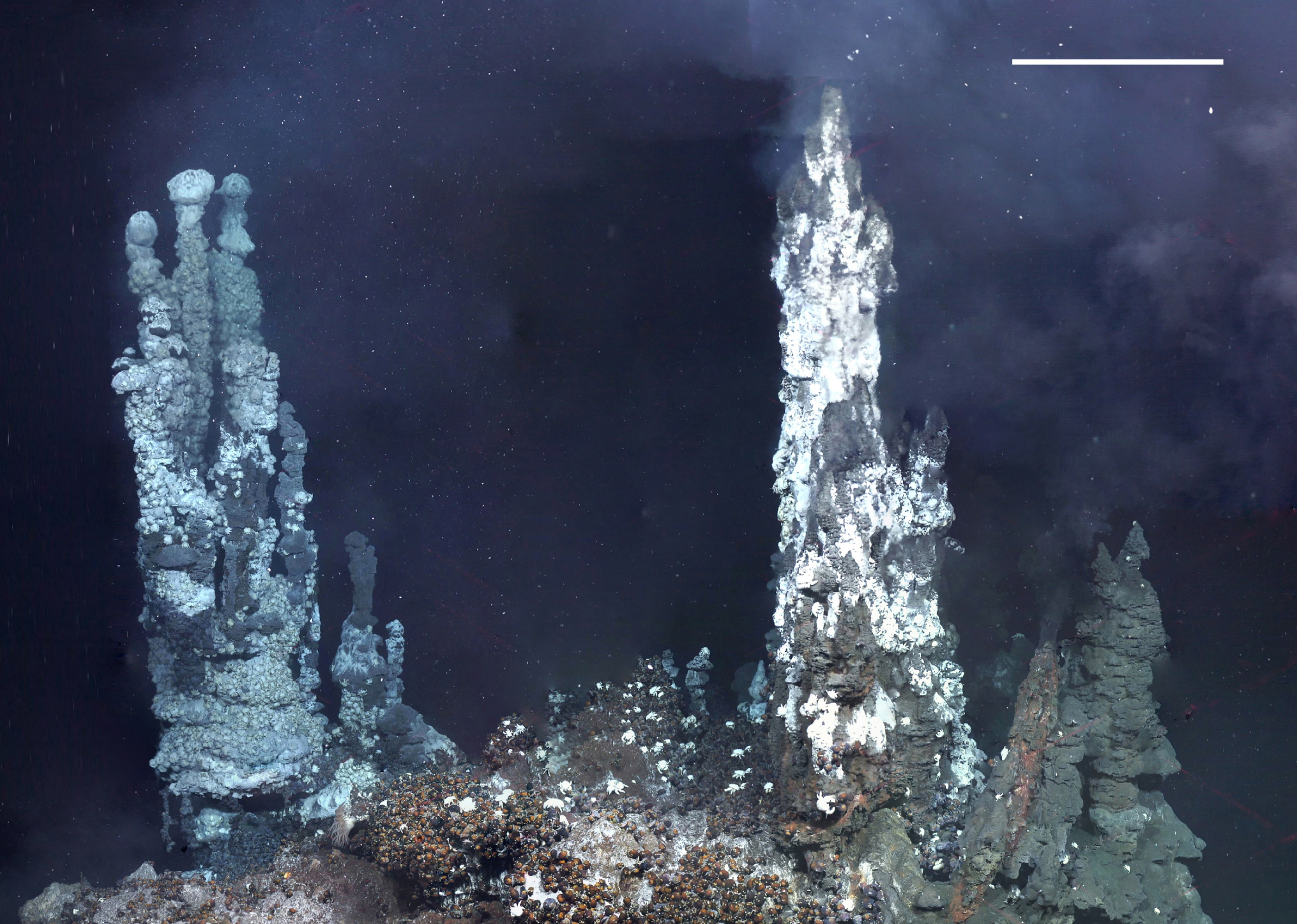
Hydrothermal vent in the East Scotia Ridge

Some hypothesize that hydrothermal vents may be a prominent source of reverse weathering. For some time, it was posited that terrestrial fluvial input was the only source of dissolved salts for the ocean. Later it was found that hydrothermal vents play a key role in the salinity of the oceans by releasing torrents of dissolved minerals that come from water/rock interactions. At these locations, some dissolved salts react with rock and are removed, thus changing the ion composition of the seawater in comparison to the hydrothermal fluid.

Some researchers hypothesize that reverse weathering could play a role in the silica cycle at hydrothermal vents. Low temperature hydrothermal vents release silicic acid from the Earth's crust, and before it is able to exit the seabed, it cools and precipitates out as clay, such as a smectite. The extent to which reverse weathering at hydrothermal vents adds to the overall silica cycle is a hot topic.

== History ==
In 1933, Victor Moritz Goldschmidt first proposed a reaction where igneous rock and volatiles would interact to generate sediments and seawater. In 1959, Lars Gunnar Sillén proposed that reactions involving the formation of silicates potentially played a role in controlling the composition and pH of seawater. At the time of Sillén's proposal, the thermodynamic constants of clay mineral reactions were not known and there were very few thermodynamic indicators that such a reaction existed. Frederick Mackenzie and Robert Garrels would then combine Goldschmidt's and Sillén's work with the concept of reconstitution reactions to derive the reverse weathering hypothesis in 1966. Since then, reverse weathering has been used as a possible explanation for various marine environment reactions and observations.

Today, there is much debate over the significance of reverse weathering. The global extent of the process has not yet been measured, but inferences can be made by using specific local examples.
