= Landscape evolution model =

A landscape evolution model is a physically-based numerical model that simulates changing terrain over the course of time. The change in, or evolution of, terrain, can be due to: glacial or fluvial erosion, sediment transport and deposition, regolith production, the slow movement of material on hillslopes, more intermittent events such as rockfalls, debris flows, landslides, and other surface processes. These changes occur in response to the land surface being uplifted above sea-level (or other base-level) by surface uplift, and also respond to subsidence. A typical landscape evolution model takes many of these factors into account.

Landscape evolution models are used primarily in the field of geomorphology. As they improve, they are beginning to be consulted by land managers to aid in decision making, most recently in the area of degraded landscapes.

The earliest landscape evolution models were developed in the 1970s. In those models, flow of water across a mesh was simulated, and cell elevations were changed in response to calculated erosional power. Modern landscape evolution models can leverage graphics processing units and other acceleration hardware and software, to run more quickly.

== See also ==
- Hillslope evolution
- SIBERIA,
- CAESAR-Lisflood,
- LANDIS II, , an open-source, forest landscape model that simulates future forests
- pyBadlands,
- Community Surface Dynamics Modeling System,
