= Biorhexistasy =

Soil formation theory

The theory of biorhexistasy describes climatic conditions necessary for periods of soil formation (pedogenesis) separated by periods of soil erosion. Proposed by pedologist Henry Erhart in 1951, the theory defines two climatic phases: biostasy and rhexistasy.

== Biostasy ==
During biostasy, abundant and regular precipitation induces strong pedogenesis characterized by chemical alteration of parent material and intensified eluviation and illuviation of soil minerals within the surface soil and subsoil layers (the solum). These processes contribute to the formation of eluvial and argillic horizons and an increased concentration of iron oxides, aluminum oxides, and other sesquioxides in the subsoil. Climatic conditions favor a vegetative cover which protects the soil from physical erosion but abundant rainfall results in the loss of mineral ions and increased concentration of those minerals in receiving bodies of water. Abundant marine calcium results in limestone formation.

== Rhexistasy ==
During rhexistasy (from rhexein, to break) the protective vegetative cover is reduced or eliminated as a result of a drier climate. Rainfall intensity is higher. The drier climate slows pedogenesis and soils no longer contribute the limestone building mineral components that characterize biostasy. Unprotected by thick vegetation or deep soils, wind acts to expose subsoil to erosion and rock to physical weathering. Freeze-thaw acts to increase the production of coarse detrital materials. The intensity of punctuating rainfall events during rhexistasy results in erosion, and the accumulation of sand and silt as sedimentary layers. During rhexistasy, the dominance of chemical weathering that characterizes biostasy is replaced by the dominance of physical weathering.

During the Pleistocene epoch, the periods of glaciation are considered to be periods of rhexistasy and the interglacial are considered periods of biostasy.

== Current use ==
The theory of biorhexistasy is used in various capacities:

- to discuss the potential for man to affect either rhexistasy-like or biostasy-like environments, and what to expect from those environments,
- to explain the role of extreme events in erosion at a site recovering from disturbance, and
- to evaluate speleothems for insight into paleoclimatic and biopedological conditions at the land surface.

== See also ==
- Land degradation
- Soil production function
