= Charles Christ =

Charles Christ may refer to:

- Chilla Christ (Charles Percival Christ, 1911–1998), Australian cricketer
- Charles L. Christ (1916–1980), American scientist, geochemist and mineralogist

== See also ==
- Charlie Crist (born 1956), American attorney, politician and governor of Florida, 2007–2011
- Chuck Crist (1951–2020), American football player
