= Hillslope evolution =

Hillslope evolution is the changes in the erosion rates, erosion styles and form of slopes of hills and mountains over time.

== Conceptual models ==
During most of the 20th century three models of hillslope evolution were widely diffused: slope decline, slope replacement and parallel slope retreat. Until the 1950s models of hillslope form evolution were central in geomorphology. The modern understanding is that the evolution of slopes is much more complex than the classical models of decline, replacement and retreat imply.

=== Slope decline ===
Slope decline was proposed by William Morris Davis in his cycle of erosion theory. It consists of a gradual decrease in slope angle as stream incision slows down. This is accompanied by slopes becoming more gentle as they accumulate with fine-grained regolith stemming from weathering.

=== Slope replacement ===
Slope replacement was first proposed by Walther Penck challenging Davis' ideas on slope development. Slope replacement describes an evolution of slopes that is associated with decreasing rates of over-all erosion (denudation). It begins with a flattening of the lowermost slope that propagates upward and backward making the uppermost slope recede and decrease its angle while it remains steeper than the lower portions. In Penck's own words: "The flattening of slopes always occurs from the bottom upward".

=== Parallel slope retreat ===
Slopes will evolve by parallel retreat when a slopes rock mass strength remains constant and basal debris, like talus, is continuously removed. In reality, however, such uniform rock strength is rare. Rock strength is related to weathering and weathering to climate, so over large distances or over long time-spans slope retreat is unlikely to remain fully parallel in the absence of a structural control which can maintain parallel retreat. Such a structural control, however, is often found in areas where hard horizontal rock layers of basalt or hard sedimentary rock overlie softer rocks. Slopes influenced by the structural control of a durable cap rock tend to cease to evolve by parallel retreat only once overlying hard layers covering softer rock have been fully eroded.

Parallel slope and scarp retreat, albeit proposed by early geomorphologists, was notably championed by Lester Charles King. King considered scarp retreat and the coalescence of pediments into pediplains a dominant processes across the globe. Further he claimed that slope decline was a special case of slope development seen only in very weak rocks that could not maintain a scarp. Slopes that are convex upslope and concave downslope and have no free face were held by King to be a form that became common in the late Tertiary. King argued that this was the result of more slowly acting surface wash caused by carpets of grass which in turn would have resulted in relatively more soil creep.

=== Unequal activity ===
The notion that slopes in an area do not develop all at the same time is known as unequal activity. Colin Hayter Crick, who coined the term, proposed that unequal activity may be regulated by removal of debris at the base of slopes. Following this thought erosion by the sea and lateral stream migration are of prime importance as these processes are effective in removing debris. Unequal activity does also imply there are great disparities between stream erosion near stream channels and apparently unchanged uplands, and between headwaters with limited erosion and the more active middle and lower courses of streams. From this it is derived that landscapes and slopes with limited river erosion may in many cases be considered as stagnant in their evolution.

== Numerical models ==
Contrary to early conceptual models that attempt to predict slope form a number of numerical models of erosion focus on describing what is happening at any given time, and are not concerned with changes in form.

Average erosion rates for a slope has been estimated using numerical models. Using the heat transfer equation of Fourier as template W.E.H. Culling reasoned the flux of mass across the height gradient of a slope would could be described in a similar fashion as:

Equation (1) q̃ = −K∇z

On the left-hand side is sediment flux which is the volume of the mass that passes a line each time unit (L^{3}/LT). K is a rate constant (L^{2}/T), and ∇z the gradient or height difference between two points at a slope divided by their horizontal distance. This model imply sediment fluxes can be estimated from the slope angles (∇z). This has been shown to be true for low-angle slopes. For more steep slopes it is not possible to infer sediment fluxes. To address this reality the following model for high angle slopes can be applied:

Equation (2) q̃ = (−K∇z)/( 1 − (|∇z|/S_{c})^{2})

S_{c} stands here for the critical gradient which at which erosion and sediment fluxes runs away. This model show that when ∇z is far from S_{c} it behaves like equation 1. On the contrary when ∇z approaches S_{c} erosion rates becomes extremely high. This last feature may represent the behavior of landslides in steep terrain.

At low erosion rates increased stream or river incision may make gentle slopes evolve into convex forms. Convex forms can thus indirectly reflect accelerated crustal uplift and its associated river incision. (Note: Walther Penck is commonly but wrongly attributed the notion that accelerated uplift leads to the formation of convex slopes.) As shown by equation 2 the angle of steep slopes changes very little even at very high increases of erosion rates, meaning that it is not possible to infer erosion rates from topography in steep slopes other than hinting they are much higher than for lower angle slopes.

=== Parabolic hills ===
Beginning with the works of Grove Karl Gilbert (1909) and William Morris Davis (1892), soil-mantled convex or parabolic hills have long been held to reflect steady state equilibrium conditions of soil production and soil erosion. Contrary to what an equilibrium between the erosion rates functions described above and the soil production function should imply soil depth can vary considerably in parabolic hills as result of stochastic bedrock weathering into soil. This means that the expected soil formation rates from the soil production function might vary greatly across a landscape in geomorphic equilibrium.

Convex hills are often associated to tors. Numerical modelling indicate that in periglacial settings broad low-angle convex hilltops can form in no less than millions of years. During the evolution of these slopes steeper initial slopes are calculated to result in the formation of numerous tors during the course of the lowering and broadening of the convex area. The presence of numerous tors would thus indicate that the original landscape was steeper and not flatter than present-day landscape.
