= Soil production function =

Soil production function

Soil production function refers to the rate of bedrock weathering into soil as a function of soil thickness. A general model suggests that the rate of physical weathering of bedrock (de/dt) can be represented as an exponential decline with soil thickness:

$de/dt = P_0 \exp{[-k h]}$

where h is soil thickness [m], P_{0} [mm/year] is the potential (or maximum) weathering rate of bedrock and k [m^{−1}] is an empirical constant.

The reduction of weathering rate with thickening of soil is related to the exponential decrease of temperature amplitude with increasing depth below the soil surface, and also the exponential decrease in average water penetration (for freely-drained soils). Parameters P_{0} and k are related to the climate and type of parent material. The value of P_{0} was found to range from 0.08 to 2.0 mm/yr for sites in northern California, and 0.05–0.14 mm/yr for sites in southeastern Australia. Meanwhile values of k do not vary significantly, ranging from 2 to 4 m^{−1}.

Several landscape evolution models have adopted the so-called humped model. This model dates back to G.K. Gilbert's Report on the Geology of the Henry Mountains (1877). Gilbert reasoned that the weathering of bedrock was fastest under an intermediate thickness of soil and slower under exposed bedrock or under thick mantled soil. This is because chemical weathering requires the presence of water. Under thin soil or exposed bedrock water tends to run off, reducing the chance of the decomposition of bedrock.

== See also ==
- Biorhexistasy
- Hillslope evolution
- Pedogenesis
- Soil functions
