= Colin Hayter Crickmay =

Canadian geomorphologist

- Born: 1899
- Died: 1988 (aged 88–89)
- Known for: Stratigraphy, Geomorphology, Paleontology
- Notable work: Jurassic History of North America (1931)
- Scientific career
- Fields: Geology
- Institutions: Geological Survey of Canada, Imperial Oil

Colin Hayter Crickmay (1899–1988) was a Canadian geologist known for his contributions to paleontology, stratigraphy and geomorphology. In particular his ideas on river and hillslope erosion have been commended. Influenced by the observations of the geologist Eleanora Knopf, he coined the concept of unequal activity to describe the great disparities that can exist between stream erosion near stream channels and apparently unchanged uplands, and between headwaters with limited erosion and the more active middle and lower courses of streams. Crick did also coin the term panplanation to describe a planation surfaces thought to be formed by lateral stream migration. In 1931 he published Jurassic History of North America: Its Bearing on the Development of Continental Structure which was well-received by North American geologists. In 1943 he worked for the Geological Survey of Canada and in 1945 for Imperial Oil Limited.
