= Argillic =

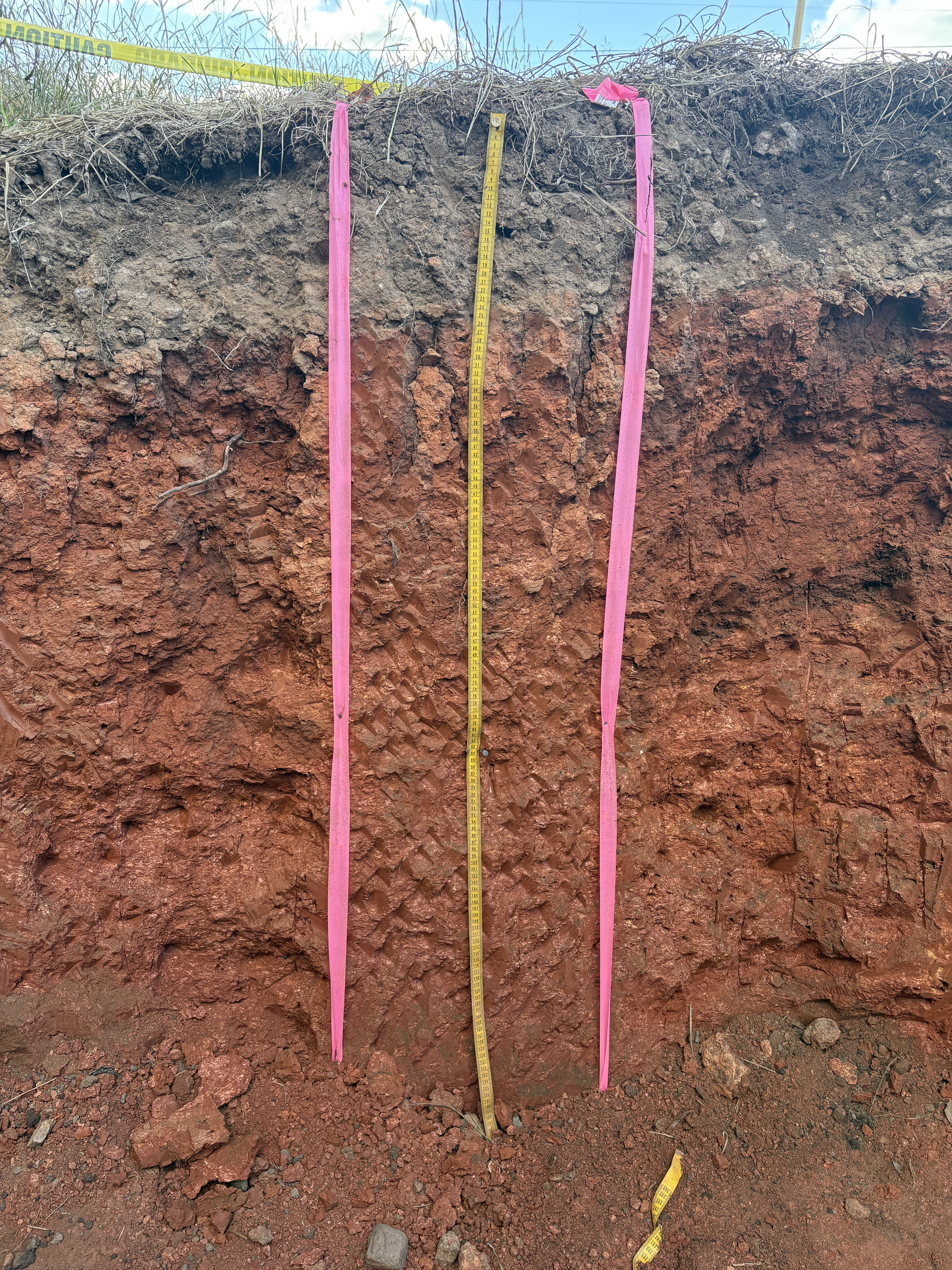
Soil profile containing an argillic subsurface horizon found outside of Raleigh, North Carolina.

Argillic is a term used in the United States Department of Agriculture Soil taxonomy to describe a subsurface horizon categorized by clay-enrichment. It is analogous to the Argic horizon in the World Reference Base system of soil taxonomy used outside of the United States. The term "Argillic" comes from the Latin argilla, meaning clay. The term Argic used by the WRB system also comes from this same root. Clay accumulation occurs in the mineral soil through primarily illuviation and translocation of preexisting clays with some formation in-situ in the soil. The red color is caused by the formation of iron oxides which form under the same wet conditions as the clay accumulation occurs.

== North American distribution and importance ==
According to a study conduct by James Bockheim at the University of Wisconsin-Madison in 2014, the argillic horizon is found in 44% of soil series across the United States. The argillic horizon is also important as starting point from which the kandic and natric horizons form, as well as commonly from which fragipans develop. The kandic is a argillic horizon in which the clays are primarily 1:1 silicate clays causing the soil to have a low cation exchange capacity, meaning the soil does not store nutrients as well. The natric is an argillic horizon in which high amounts of exchangeable sodium have accumulated. Fragipans are layers of soil with high bulk density and brittle characteristics that form commonly within argillic horizons but can also be found in albic horizons.

In addition to currently developing argillic horizons, argillic paleosols (paleo-argillics) can also be found throughout North America and are important contributors to soil fertility and stability. A paleosol describes a soil formed under a different climate than the current one and buried under sediment so that the buried soil remains preserved. When a paleosol shows evidence of some continued soil development (pedogenesis) it is termed a "polygenetic" soil. A variety of paleosols and polygenetic soils are recognized as containing paleo-argillic horizons including the Wounded Moose paleosol of the Yukon in Canada and the Berino Paleosol of New Mexico in the United States. Though the climates of these soils are no longer suitable for the formation of argillic horizons, their existence proves that at one point in the past the climate was hot enough and wet enough for their development.

== Taxonomy ==
=== Distribution of classification ===
In USDA soil taxonomy, the argillic is considered a diagnostic subsurface horizon, meaning that is not part of the epipedon (the upper part of the soil) and is used to describe higher soil taxonomy categories. There are currently 12 soil orders described in the USDA soil taxonomy system. The argillic horizon is required for the classification of Alfisols and Ultisols and cannot be found in Histosols or Entisol. The argillic horizon can be found with variable frequency in the rest of the soil orders.

In addition there are two soil orders currently undergoing the proposal process to be added to USDA soil taxonomy: the Aquasol and Artesol. The argillic horizon would be able to be found in the Aquasol but not in the Artesol due to the necessary soil disturbance

=== USDA soil taxonomy requirements ===
USDA soil taxonomy describes five different characteristics of argillic horizons and states that most occurrences of argillic horizons will meet two or more of the characteristic criteria.

1. The argillic must have at least 1.2x the amount of clay of any overlying eluvial horizon.
2. Clay films or bridges (cutans and argillans) must be visible either with the naked eye or with the use of a hand lens.Cutans are deposits of colloidal (suspended in solution) clay particles on the surfaces of aggregates, and argillans are parallel layers of cutans. Clay bridges describe this accumulation of clay as it connects or "bridges" between larger sand grains.
3. The argillic often has a large ration of over half fine clay particles, clay particles under 0.2 micrometers in size.
4. Rock structure cannot by present in more than half of the volume of the horizon. Rock structure includes stratification of unconsolidated materials as well as saprolite.
5. The argillic must be parallel to the surface of the soil profile. The argillic will only be exposed at the soil surface if the epipedon (upper layer of the soil) has been removed either by natural or human influenced erosion.

=== World Reference Base Taxonomy Requirements ===
The World Reference Base (WRB) system of soil taxonomy describes what it calls the "Argic" horizon, analogous to the argillic horizon in USDA soil taxonomy and stemming from the same Latin root argilla, meaning white clay. In the WRB system, the argic horizon has only four acknowledged diagnostic criteria after the given requirement of being a mineral soil (as opposed to organic soils, like those found in the USDA Histosol order).

1. The argic horizon must meet the texture requirements of containing 8% or more of clay by volume, and having a texture class that is not sand.
2. The argic horizon must be finer than an overlying horizon and/or must show evidence of clay illuviation.
3. The argic horizon cannot be part of the natric or spodic horizons.
4. The argic horizon must be at least 1/10th of the thickness of the overlying mineral material (meaning this does not include any overlying organic horizons that may be present).

== Formation ==
=== Pedogenesis ===
Pedogenesis is synonymous with clay formation. All weathering, both chemical and physical, eventually leads to clay formation. Peter Birkeland describes four primary ways in which clay-enrichment occurs in soils.

- Translocation by eluviation
  - The eluviation (downward movement) of clay particles through the soil by physical means (ie. water movement). Where the clay particles originate is termed the "zone of eluviation" and the "zone of illuviation" is the part of the horizon in which the clay particles move to. The argillic horizon is synonymous with the zone of illuviation.
- Translocation by eolian (wind) processes
  - Previously existing clays are transported into new environments through wind and accumulate on the surface.
- Weathering in-situ
  - Chemical and physical weathering both cause the reduction of particles into clay sized pieces (smaller than 2 micrometers).
- Neoformation (synthesis in solution)
  - Clay minerals are precipitated in solution or formed by the alteration of amorphous (non-crystalline) minerals.

=== Clay mineralogy ===
There are seven clay primary mineral groups, all of which are silicates. Within these, clays fall under a variety of geometries including tetrahedral, octahedral, cubic, and dodecahedral. These geometries are then layered with different minerals between them contributing to the mineralogical properties.

The type of clay formed in the pedogenesis of argillic horizons is dependent on the initial mineral availability and diversity in the parent material, as well as the pH of the soil, and the Eh of the soil. Eh is the potential for redoximorphic reactions to occur in soil and is measured by the voltage in the soil.
