= Fred T. Mackenzie =

American sedimentary biogeochemist (1934–2024)

Frederick T. Mackenzie
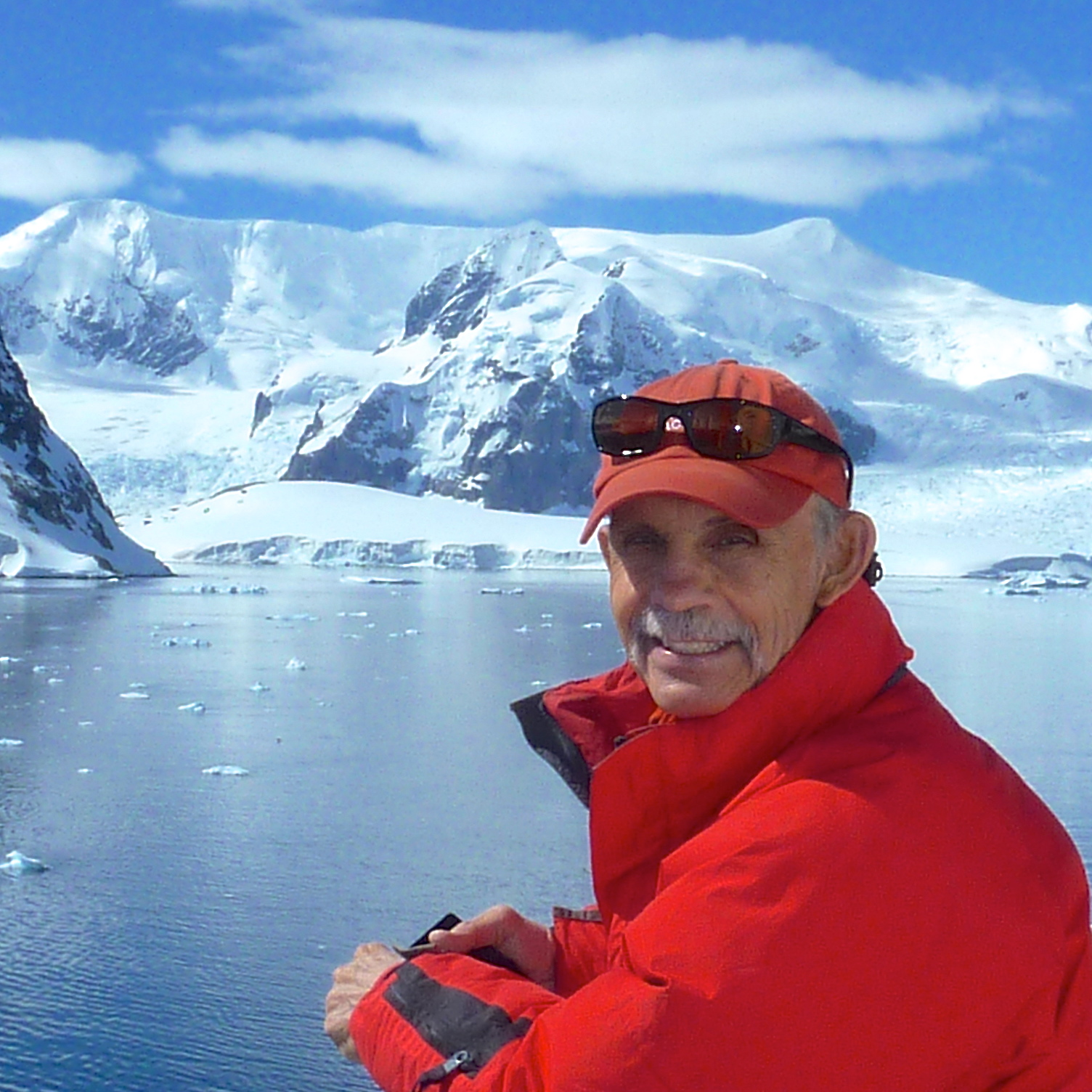
- Mackenzie in 2010
- Born: March 17, 1934
- Died: January 3, 2024 (aged 89); Honolulu, Hawaii, U.S.
- Education: Upsala College; Lehigh University
- Known for: Evolution of Sedimentary Rocks
- Spouse: Judith Mackenzie
- Awards: See awards section
- Scientific career
- Fields: Sedimentary and global geochemistry
- Institutions: University of Hawaii; Northwestern University
- Thesis: (1959 & 1962)
- Website: Fred T. Mackenzie

Frederick T. Mackenzie (March 17, 1934 – January 3, 2024) was an American sedimentary and global biogeochemist. Mackenzie applied experimental and field data coupled to a sound theoretical framework to the solution of geological, geochemical, and oceanographic problems at various time and space scales.

Mackenzie is identified closely with the book Evolution of Sedimentary Rocks co-authored in 1971 by Mackenzie with Robert M. Garrels, which reawakened and revitalized the scientific community to the ideas of the British geologist James Hutton that lay fallow for more than 150 years. Evolution of Sedimentary Rocks expanded on the theory of reverse weathering proposed by Mackenzie and Garrels in 1966.

== Life and career ==
Mackenzie earned a bachelor's degree in physics and geology from Upsala College in 1955. He later earned an M.S. degree in 1959 and his Ph.D. in 1962 in geological sciences and biogeochemistry from Lehigh University. His Ph.D. dissertation research dealt with a paleocurrent and environmental analysis of the ~ 140 Ma Cretaceous Lakota and equivalent rock units of the Western Interior of the United States.

Following completion of his Ph.D., Mackenzie went to work full-time for Shell Oil Company as an Exploration and Research Geologist. Two of his assignments at the time involved studies of the stratigraphy and structure of Ordovician carbonates in the Appalachian Mountains as targets for oil exploration and of the Devonian Marcellus Shale, which in recent years has become a horizon for gas production by fracking and a subject of strong environmental concern. Then in 1963, Mackenzie accepted a position as Staff Geochemist and assistant director at the Bermuda Biological Station for Research (BBSR, now the Bermuda Institute of Ocean Sciences). One of his tasks at BBSR was to manage Hydrostation S, the longest continuously occupied hydrostation in the world.

In 1967 Mackenzie joined the faculty at Northwestern University becoming professor and department chair in 1971. Here between 1967 and 1981, he in association with colleagues Robert Garrels, Hal Helgeson, Abraham Lerman and his many graduate students and national and international colleagues published a number of classic papers involving an interdisciplinary range of scientific topics including early diagenetic processes of reverse weathering and controls on seawater composition, pore water geochemistry, kinetics and thermodynamics of mineral-water reactions, and modeling of Earth's surface environmental system over geological time.

In 1982 Mackenzie became professor at the University of Hawaii at Manoa, where he continued doing research and teaching, although in 2008, he became a Professor Emeritus of Oceanography and Geology & Geophysics. At the University of Hawaii, Mackenzie broadened his research and teaching program even more into the field of marine biogeochemistry, particularly into the biogeochemical interactions involving carbon and oxygen and the nutrient elements of nitrogen, phosphorus, and silicon between the land and coastal waters. He also investigated CO_{2} exchange in coastal marine waters, and the biogeochemistry and consequences of ocean acidification for reefs and other carbonate ecosystems. In 1997, Mackenzie founded the Global Environmental Science Program at the University of Hawai‘i, at Manoa.

Mackenzie authored or co-authored nearly 300 scholarly works, and has published with more than 200 co-authors. Mackenzie was also a passionate athlete, lifetime traveler, and mountaineer having climbed in many ranges of the world.

Mackenzie died in Honolulu, Hawaii, on January 3, 2024, at the age of 89.

== Fellowships, awards and honors ==
Mackenzie was a Fellow of the Mineralogical Society of America, the Geological Society of America, the Geochemical Society, the European Association of Geochemistry, and the American Association for the Advancement of Science, and was a Life Trustee of the Bermuda Institute of Ocean Sciences. He has received innumerable awards and honors including:

- 1966: Journal of Sedimentary Petrology Best Paper Award (with R. M. Garrels)
- 1972: American Geophysical Union Distinguished Visiting Scientist
- 1982: University of Hawaii Enhancement of Graduate Studies and Student Life Award
- 1984: University of Kansas Merrill W. Haas Visiting Distinguished Scientist and M. W. Haas Medal
- 1988: Université libre de Bruxelles Francqui International Medal of Science
- 1991: Bermuda Biological Station for Research Andrew W. Mellon Foundation Fellowship
- 1991: University of Hawaii Regents' Medal for Excellence in Research
- 1993–1994: President of Sigma Xi (University of Hawaii Chapter)
- 1993: The Electrochemical Society Citation for Outstanding Accomplishments in the Field of Atmospheric Chemistry
- 1994: University of Hawaii Regents' Medal for Excellence in Teaching
- 1995: Achievement Awards for College Scientists (ARCS) Scientist of the Year
- 1995: Institute for Advanced Study, Berlin Wissenscahftskolleg Fellowship
- 1996: Bermuda Institute of Ocean Sciences Life Trustee
- 1999: Northwestern University Department of Earth and Planetary Sciences Distinguished Visiting Professor
- 1999: Texas A&M University Department of Geology and Geophysics First Michel T. Halbouty Medal and Visiting Chair
- 2003: Hawaii Academy of Sciences Distinguished Research Scientist Award
- 2005: Society for Sedimentary Geology Francis J. Pettijohn Medal for Excellence in Sedimentology
- 2006: The Geochemical Society Clair C. Patterson Award
- 2007: International Association of GeoChemistry Vladimir I. Vernadsky Medal
- 2009: Geochemistry Gold Medal American Chemical Society
- 2010: The Explorers Club Fellow National

== Selected publications ==
=== Books ===
- Evolution of Sedimentary Rocks with R. M. Garrels (1971) ISBN 0-393-09959-8
- Chemical Cycles and the Global Environment – Assessing Human Influences with R. M. Garrels, C. Hunt (1973, 1974, 1975) ISBN 0-913232-29-7
- Chemical Cycles in the Evolution of Earth with C. B. Gregor, R. M. Garrels, and J. B. Maynard (1988) ISBN 978-0-471-08911-7
- Geochemistry of Sedimentary Carbonates with R. W. Morse (1990) ISBN 978-0-444-88781-8
- Interactions of C, N, P and S Biogeochemical Cycles and Global Change with R. Wollast and L. Chou (1993) ISBN 978-3-642-76064-8
- Biotic Feedbacks in the Global Climatic System: Will the Warming Feed the Warming? with G. Woodwell (1995) ISBN 978-0-19-508640-9
- Carbon in the Geobiosphere—Earth's Outer Shell with A. Lerman (2006) ISBN 9048170222
- "Biological and geochemical forcings to Phanerozoic change in seawater, atmosphere, and carbonate precipitate composition." in Evolution of Primary Producers in the Sea with M. W. Guidry and R. S. Arvidson (2007) ISBN 978-0-12-370518-1
- Our Changing Planet: An Introduction to Earth System Science and Global Environmental Change (2011) ISBN 978-0-321-66772-4

=== Journal articles ===
- "Silicates: Reactivity with Sea Water" in Science, with R. M. Garrels (1965)
- "Chemical mass balance between rivers and oceans" in American Journal of Science with R. M. Garrels (1966)
- "The Pleistocene history of Bermuda" in Geological Society of America Bulletin with L. S. Land and S. J. Gould (1967)
- "A Quantitative Model for the Sedimentary Rock Cycle" in Journal of Marine Chemistry with R. M. Garrels (1972)
- "Time Variability of Pore Water Chemistry in Recent Carbonate Sediments" in Geochimica et Cosmochimica Acta with D. C. Thorstenson (1974)
- "Tectonic Controls of Phanerozoic Sedimentary Rock Cycling" in Journal of the Geological Society with J. Pigott (1981)
- "Stabilities of Synthetic Magnesian Calcites in Aqueous Solution: Comparison with Biogenic Materials" in Geochimica et Cosmochimica Acta with W. D. Bishoff and F. C. Bishop (1987)
- "Bank-derived Carbonate Sediment Transport and Dissolution in the Hawaiian Archipelago" in Aquatic Geochemistry with C. Sabine (1995)
- "The Dolomite Problem: Control of Precipitation Kinetics by Temperature and Saturation State" in American Journal of Science with R. S. Arvidson (1999)
- "Biogeochemical Responses of the Carbon Cycle to Natural and Human Perturbations: Past, Present, and Future" in American Journal of Science with A. Lerman and L. M. Ver (1999)
- "Shallow-water Oceans: a Source or Sink of Atmospheric CO_{2}?" in Frontiers in Ecology and the Environment with A. J. Andersson (2004)
- "Coastal Ocean and Carbonate Systems in the High CO_{2} World of the Anthropocene" in American Journal of Science with A. J. Andersson and A. Lerman (2005)
- "Initial Responses of Carbonate-rich Shelf Sediments to Rising Atmospheric pCO_{2} and 'Ocean Acidification': Role of High Mg-Calcites" in Geochimica et Cosmochimica Acta with J. W. Morse and A. J. Andersson (2006)
- "Coupled C, N, P, and O Biogeochemical Cycling at the Land-ocean Interface" in Treatise on Coastal and Estuarine Science with A. Lerman and E.H. DeCarlo (2011)
- "The Marine Carbon System and Ocean Acidification during Phanerozoic Time" in Geochemical Perspectives with A. J. Andersson (2013)
- "The sensitivity of the Phanerozoic inorganic carbon system to the onset of pelagic sedimentation" in Aquatic Geochemistry with R. S. Arvidson and R. A, Berner (2014)
- "Evolution of sedimentary rocks" in Treatise on Geochemistry with J. Veizer (2014)
