= Weathering =

Deterioration of rocks and minerals through exposure to the elements

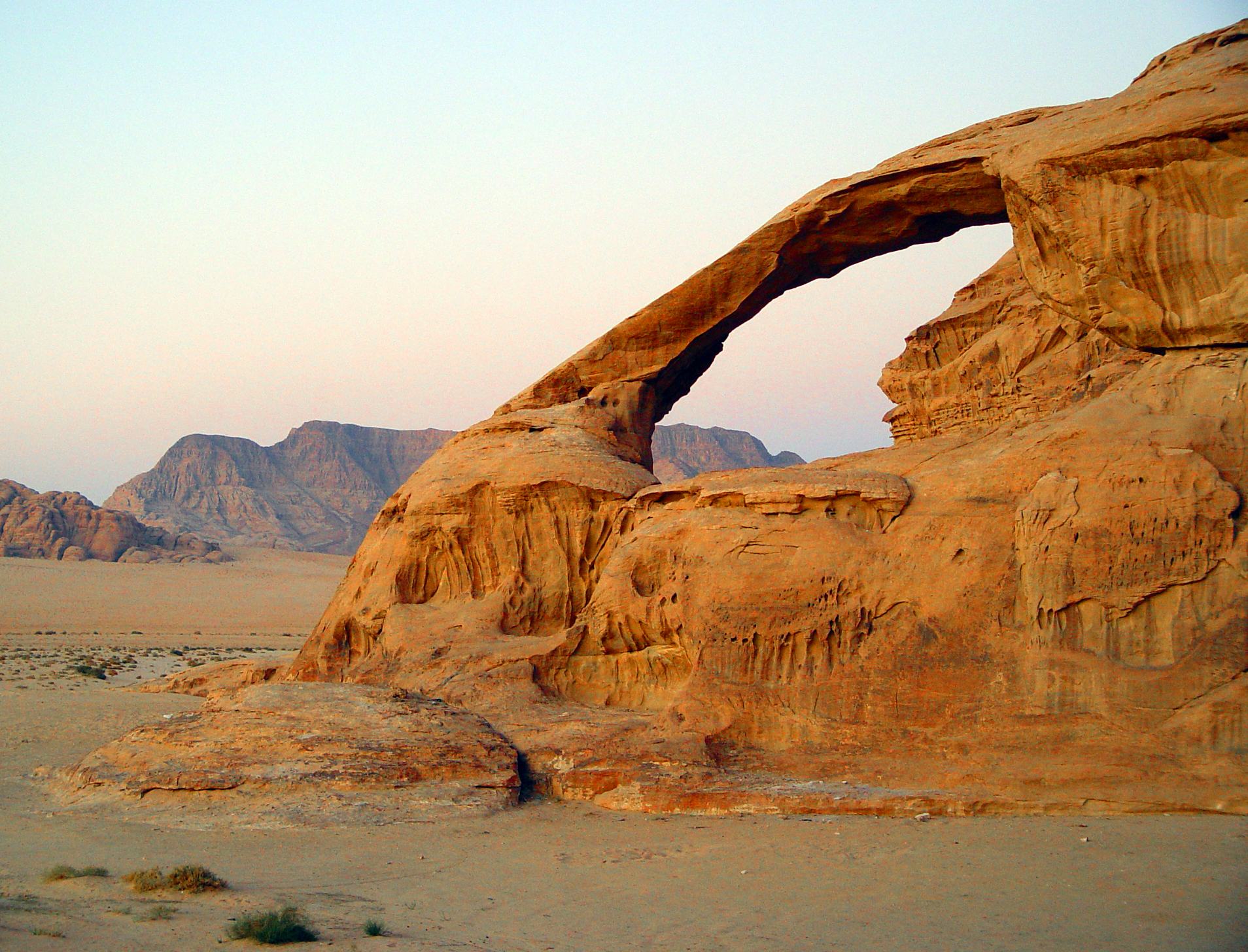
A natural arch produced by erosion of differentially weathered rock in Jebel Kharaz (Jordan)

Weathering is the deterioration of rocks, soils and minerals (as well as wood and artificial materials) through contact with water, atmospheric gases, sunlight, and biological organisms. It occurs in situ (on-site, with little or no movement), and so is distinct from erosion, which involves the transport of rocks and minerals by agents such as water, ice, snow, wind, waves and gravity.

Weathering processes are either physical or chemical. The former involves the breakdown of rocks and soils through such mechanical effects as heat, water, ice, and wind. The latter covers reactions to water, atmospheric gases and biologically produced chemicals with rocks and soils. Water is the principal agent behind both kinds, though atmospheric oxygen and carbon dioxide and the activities of biological organisms are also important. Biological chemical weathering is also called biological weathering.

The materials left after the rock breaks down combine with organic material to create soil. Many of Earth's landforms and landscapes are the result of weathering, erosion and redeposition. Weathering is a crucial part of the rock cycle; sedimentary rock, the product of weathered rock, covers 66% of the Earth's continents and much of the ocean floor.

== Physical ==
Physical weathering, also called mechanical weathering or disaggregation, is the class of processes that causes the disintegration of rocks without chemical change. Physical weathering involves the breakdown of rocks into smaller fragments through processes such as expansion and contraction, mainly due to temperature changes. Two types of physical breakdown are freeze-thaw weathering and thermal fracturing. Pressure release can also cause weathering without temperature change. It is usually much less important than chemical weathering, but can be significant in subarctic or alpine environments. Furthermore, chemical and physical weathering often go hand in hand. For example, cracks extended by physical weathering will increase the surface area exposed to chemical action, thus amplifying the rate of disintegration.

Frost weathering is the most important form of physical weathering. Next in importance is wedging by plant roots, which sometimes enter cracks in rocks and pry them apart. The burrowing of worms or other animals may also help disintegrate rock, as can "plucking" by lichens.

=== Frost ===
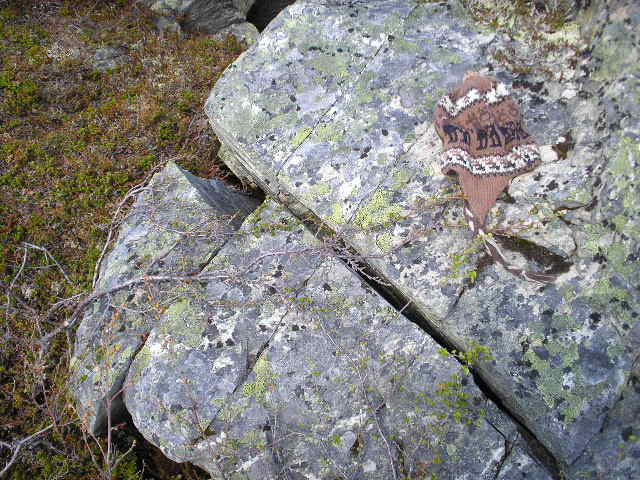
A rock in Abisko, Sweden, fractured along existing joints possibly by frost weathering or thermal stress

Frost weathering is the collective name for those forms of physical weathering that are caused by the formation of ice within rock outcrops. It was long believed that the most important of these is frost wedging, which is the widening of cracks or joints in rocks resulting from the expansion of porewater when it freezes. A growing body of theoretical and experimental work suggests that ice segregation, whereby supercooled water migrates to lenses of ice forming within the rock, is the more important mechanism.

When water freezes the volume increases by 9.2%. This expansion can theoretically generate pressures greater than 200 megapascals (29,000 psi), though a more realistic upper limit is 14 megapascals (2,000 psi). This is still much greater than the tensile strength of granite, which is about 4 megapascals (580 psi). This makes frost wedging, in which pore water freezes and its volumetric expansion fractures the enclosing rock, appear to be a plausible mechanism for frost weathering. Ice will simply expand out of a straight open fracture before it can generate significant pressure. Thus, frost wedging can only take place in small tortuous fractures. The rock must also be almost completely saturated with water, or the ice will simply expand into the air spaces in the unsaturated rock without generating much pressure. These conditions are unusual enough that frost wedging is unlikely to be the dominant process of frost weathering. Frost wedging is most effective where there are daily cycles of melting and freezing of water-saturated rock, so it is unlikely to be significant in the tropics, in polar regions or in arid climates.

Ice segregation is a less well characterized mechanism of physical weathering. It takes place because ice grains always have a surface layer, often just a few molecules thick, that resembles liquid water more than solid ice, even at temperatures well below the freezing point. This premelted liquid layer has unusual properties, including a strong tendency to draw in water by capillary action from warmer parts of the rock. This results in growth of the ice grain that puts considerable pressure on the surrounding rock, up to ten times greater than is likely with frost wedging. This mechanism is most effective in rock whose temperature averages just below the freezing point, −4 to −15 °C (25 to 5 °F). Ice segregation results in growth of ice needles and ice lenses within fractures in the rock and parallel to the rock surface, which gradually pry the rock apart.

=== Thermal stress ===
Thermal stress weathering results from the expansion and contraction of rock due to temperature changes. Thermal stress weathering is most effective when the heated portion of the rock is buttressed by surrounding rock, so that it is free to expand in only one direction.

Thermal stress weathering comprises two main types, thermal shock and thermal fatigue. Thermal shock takes place when the stresses are so great that the rock cracks immediately, but this is uncommon. More typical is thermal fatigue, in which the stresses are not great enough to cause immediate rock failure, but repeated cycles of stress and release gradually weaken the rocks. Block disintegration, when rock joints weaken from temperature fluctuations and the rock splits into rectangular blocks, can be attributed to thermal fatigue.

Thermal stress weathering is an important mechanism in deserts, where there is a large diurnal temperature range, hot in the day and cold at night. As a result, thermal stress weathering is sometimes called insolation weathering, but this is misleading. Thermal stress weathering can be caused by any large change of temperature, and not just intense solar heating. It is likely as important in cold climates as in hot, arid climates. Wildfires can also be a significant cause of rapid thermal stress weathering.

The importance of thermal stress weathering has long been discounted by geologists, based on experiments in the early 20th century that seemed to show that its effects were unimportant. These experiments have since been criticized as unrealistic, since the rock samples were small, were polished (which reduces nucleation of fractures), and were not buttressed. These small samples were thus able to expand freely in all directions when heated in experimental ovens, which failed to produce the kinds of stress likely in natural settings. The experiments were also more sensitive to thermal shock than thermal fatigue, but thermal fatigue is likely the more important mechanism in nature. Geomorphologists have begun to reemphasize the importance of thermal stress weathering, particularly in cold climates.

=== Pressure release ===
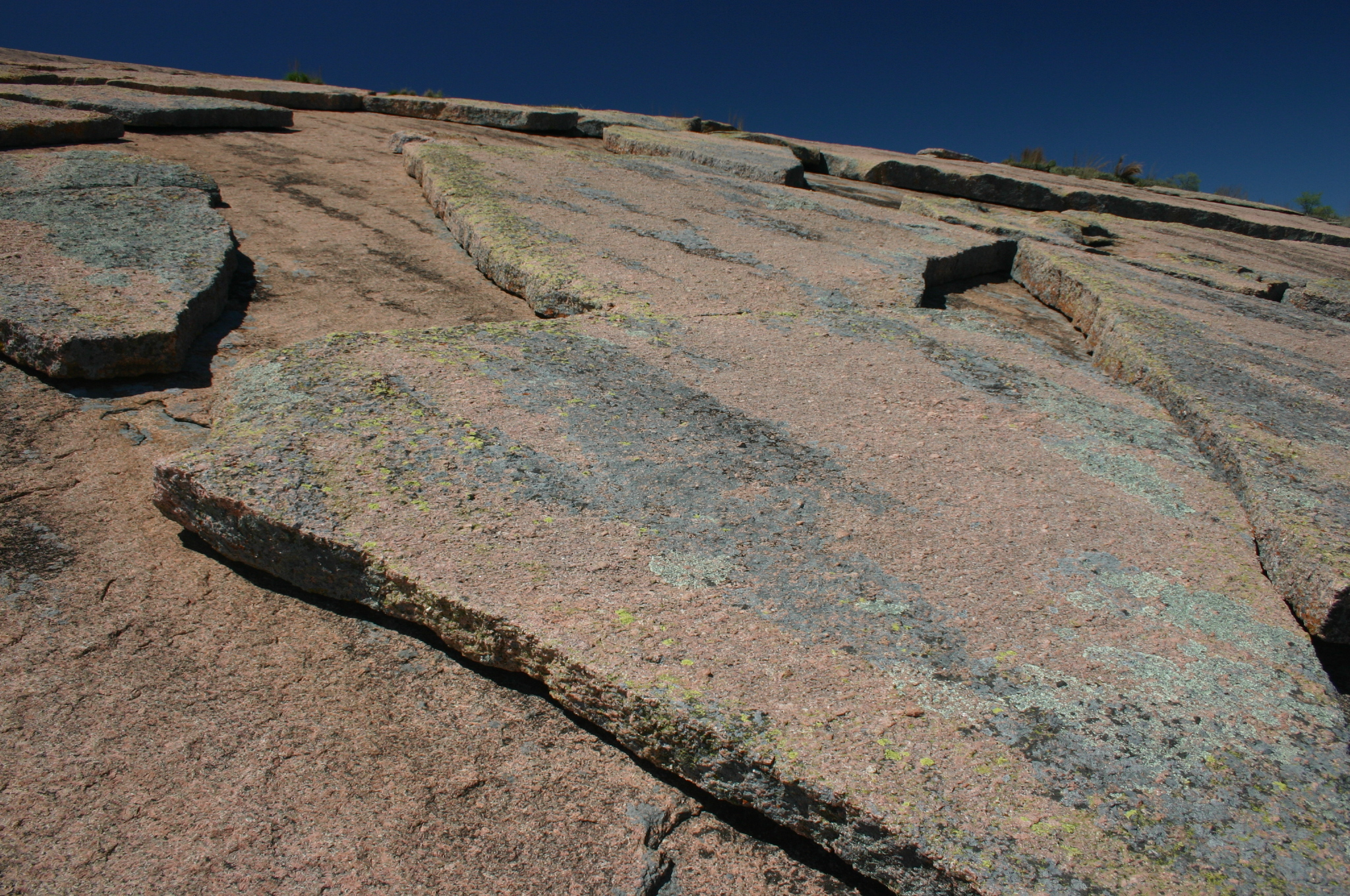
Exfoliated granite sheets in Texas, possibly caused by pressure release

Pressure release or unloading is a form of physical weathering seen when deeply buried rock is exhumed. Intrusive igneous rocks, such as granite, are formed deep beneath the Earth's surface. They are under tremendous pressure because of the overlying rock material. When erosion removes the overlying rock material, these intrusive rocks are exposed and the pressure on them is released. The outer parts of the rocks then tend to expand. The expansion sets up stresses which cause fractures parallel to the rock surface to form. Over time, sheets of rock break away from the exposed rocks along the fractures, a process known as exfoliation. Exfoliation due to pressure release is also known as sheeting.

As with thermal weathering, pressure release is most effective in buttressed rock. Here the differential stress directed toward the unbuttressed surface can be as high as 35 megapascals (5,100 psi), easily enough to shatter rock. This mechanism is also responsible for spalling in mines and quarries, and for the formation of joints in rock outcrops.

Retreat of an overlying glacier can also lead to exfoliation due to pressure release. This can be enhanced by other physical wearing mechanisms.

=== Salt-crystal growth ===
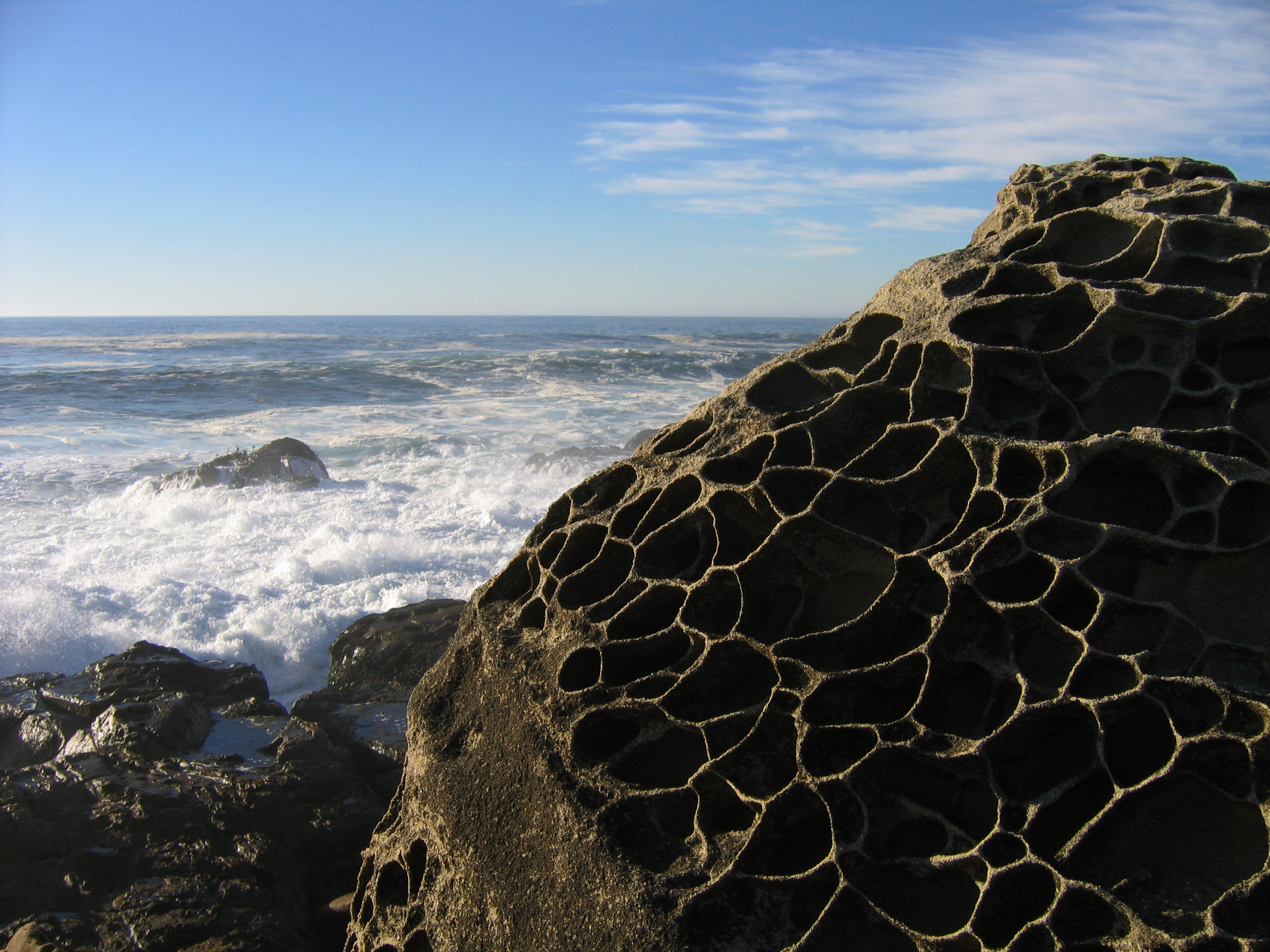
Tafoni at Salt Point State Park, Sonoma County, California

Salt crystallization (also known as salt weathering, salt wedging or haloclasty) causes disintegration of rocks when saline solutions seep into cracks and joints in the rocks and evaporate, leaving salt crystals behind. As with ice segregation, the surfaces of the salt grains draw in additional dissolved salts through capillary action, causing the growth of salt lenses that exert high pressure on the surrounding rock. Sodium and magnesium salts are the most effective at producing salt weathering. Salt weathering can also take place when pyrite in sedimentary rock is chemically weathered to iron(II) sulfate and gypsum, which then crystallize as salt lenses.

Salt crystallization can take place wherever salts are concentrated by evaporation. It is thus most common in arid climates where strong heating causes strong evaporation and along coasts. Salt weathering is likely important in the formation of tafoni, a class of cavernous rock weathering structures.

=== Biomechanical relationship ===
Living organisms may contribute to mechanical weathering, as well as chemical weathering (see § Biological weathering below). Lichens and mosses grow on essentially bare rock surfaces and create a more humid chemical microenvironment. The attachment of these organisms to the rock surface enhances physical as well as chemical breakdown of the surface microlayer of the rock. Lichens have been observed to pry mineral grains loose from bare shale with their hyphae (rootlike attachment structures), a process described as plucking, and to pull the fragments into their body, where the fragments then undergo a process of chemical weathering not unlike digestion. On a larger scale, seedlings sprouting in a crevice and plant roots exert physical pressure as well as providing a pathway for water and chemical infiltration.

== Chemical ==
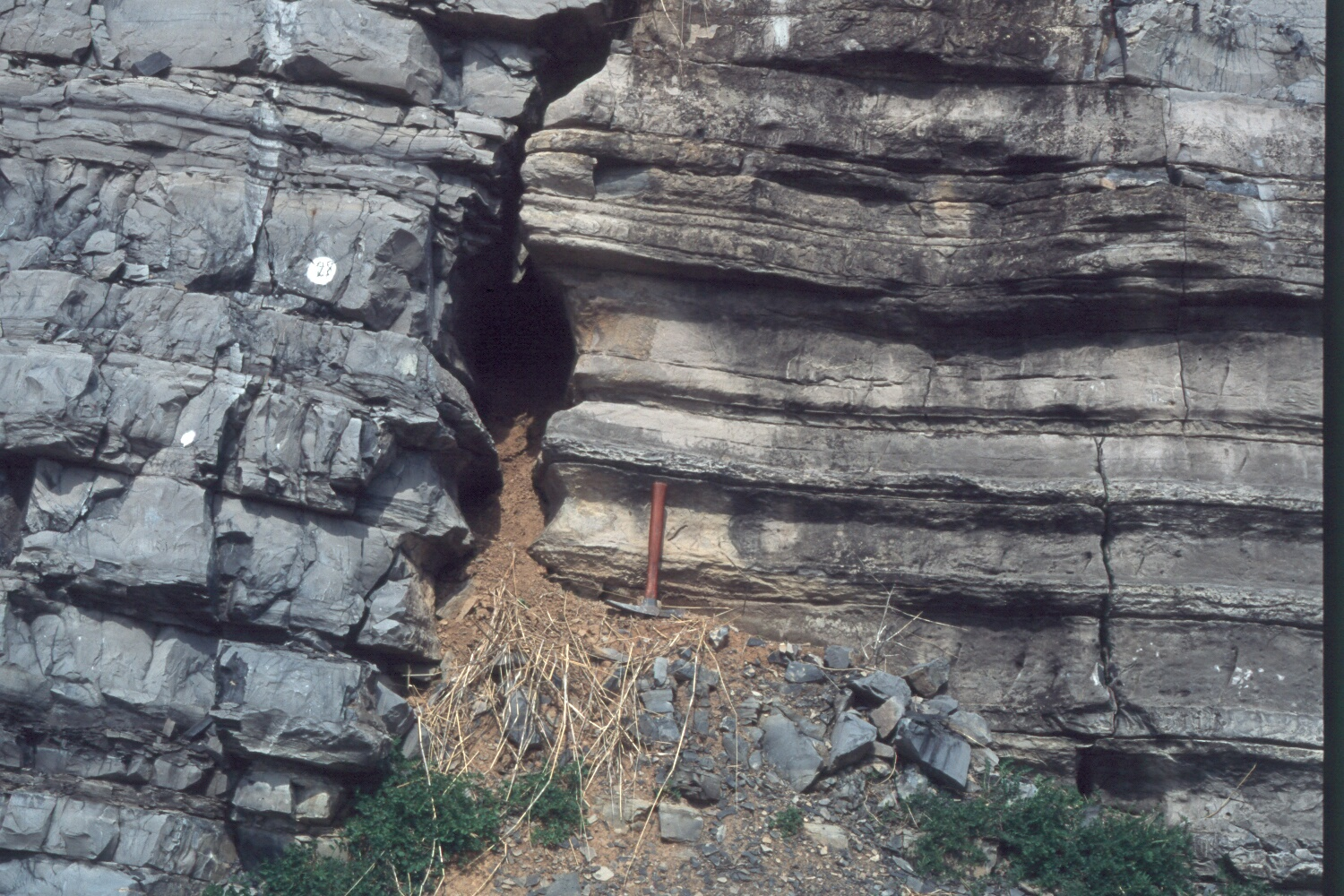
Comparison of unweathered (left) and weathered (right) limestone

Most rock forms at elevated temperature and pressure, and the minerals making up the rock are often chemically unstable in the relatively cool, wet, and oxidizing conditions typical of the Earth's surface. Chemical weathering takes place when water, oxygen, carbon dioxide, and other chemical substances react with rock to change its composition. These reactions convert some of the original primary minerals in the rock to secondary minerals, remove other substances as solutes, and leave the most stable minerals as a chemically unchanged resistate. In effect, chemical weathering changes the original set of minerals in the rock into a new set of minerals that is in closer equilibrium with surface conditions. True equilibrium is rarely reached, because weathering is a slow process, and leaching carries away solutes produced by weathering reactions before they can accumulate to equilibrium levels. This is particularly true in tropical environments.

Water is the principal agent of chemical weathering, converting many primary minerals to clay minerals or hydrated oxides via reactions collectively described as hydrolysis. Oxygen is also important, acting to oxidize many minerals, as is carbon dioxide, whose weathering reactions are described as carbonation.

The process of mountain block uplift is important in exposing new rock strata to the atmosphere and moisture, enabling important chemical weathering to occur; significant release occurs of Ca^{2+} and other ions into surface waters.

=== Dissolution ===
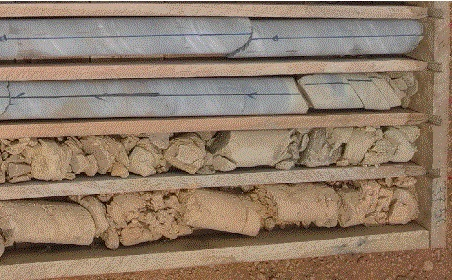
Limestone core samples at different stages of chemical weathering, from very high at shallow depths (bottom) to very low at greater depths (top). Slightly weathered limestone shows brownish stains, while highly weathered limestone loses much of its carbonate mineral content, leaving behind clay. Limestone drill core taken from the carbonate West Congolian deposit in Kimpese, Democratic Republic of Congo.

Dissolution (also called simple solution or congruent dissolution) is the process in which a mineral dissolves completely without producing any new solid substance. Rainwater easily dissolves soluble minerals, such as halite or gypsum, but can also dissolve highly resistant minerals such as quartz, given sufficient time. Water breaks the bonds between atoms in the crystal:

The overall reaction for dissolution of quartz is

SiO_{2} + 2 H_{2}O → H_{4}SiO_{4}

The dissolved quartz takes the form of silicic acid.

A particularly important form of dissolution is carbonate dissolution, in which atmospheric carbon dioxide enhances solution weathering. Carbonate dissolution affects rocks containing calcium carbonate, such as limestone and chalk. It takes place when rainwater combines with carbon dioxide to form carbonic acid, a weak acid, which dissolves calcium carbonate (limestone) and forms soluble calcium bicarbonate. Despite a slower reaction kinetics, this process is thermodynamically favored at low temperature, because colder water holds more dissolved carbon dioxide gas (due to the retrograde solubility of gases). Carbonate dissolution is therefore an important feature of glacial weathering.

Carbonate dissolution involves the following steps:

CO_{2} + H_{2}O → H_{2}CO_{3}
carbon dioxide + water → carbonic acid

H_{2}CO_{3} + CaCO_{3} → Ca(HCO_{3})_{2}
carbonic acid + calcium carbonate → calcium bicarbonate

Carbonate dissolution on the surface of well-jointed limestone produces a dissected limestone pavement. This process is most effective along the joints, widening and deepening them.

In unpolluted environments, the pH of rainwater due to dissolved carbon dioxide is around 5.6. Acid rain occurs when gases such as sulfur dioxide and nitrogen oxides are present in the atmosphere. These oxides react in the rain water to produce stronger acids and can lower the pH to 4.5 or even 3.0. Sulfur dioxide, SO_{2}, comes from volcanic eruptions or from fossil fuels, and can become sulfuric acid within rainwater, which can cause solution weathering to the rocks on which it falls.

=== Hydrolysis and carbonation ===
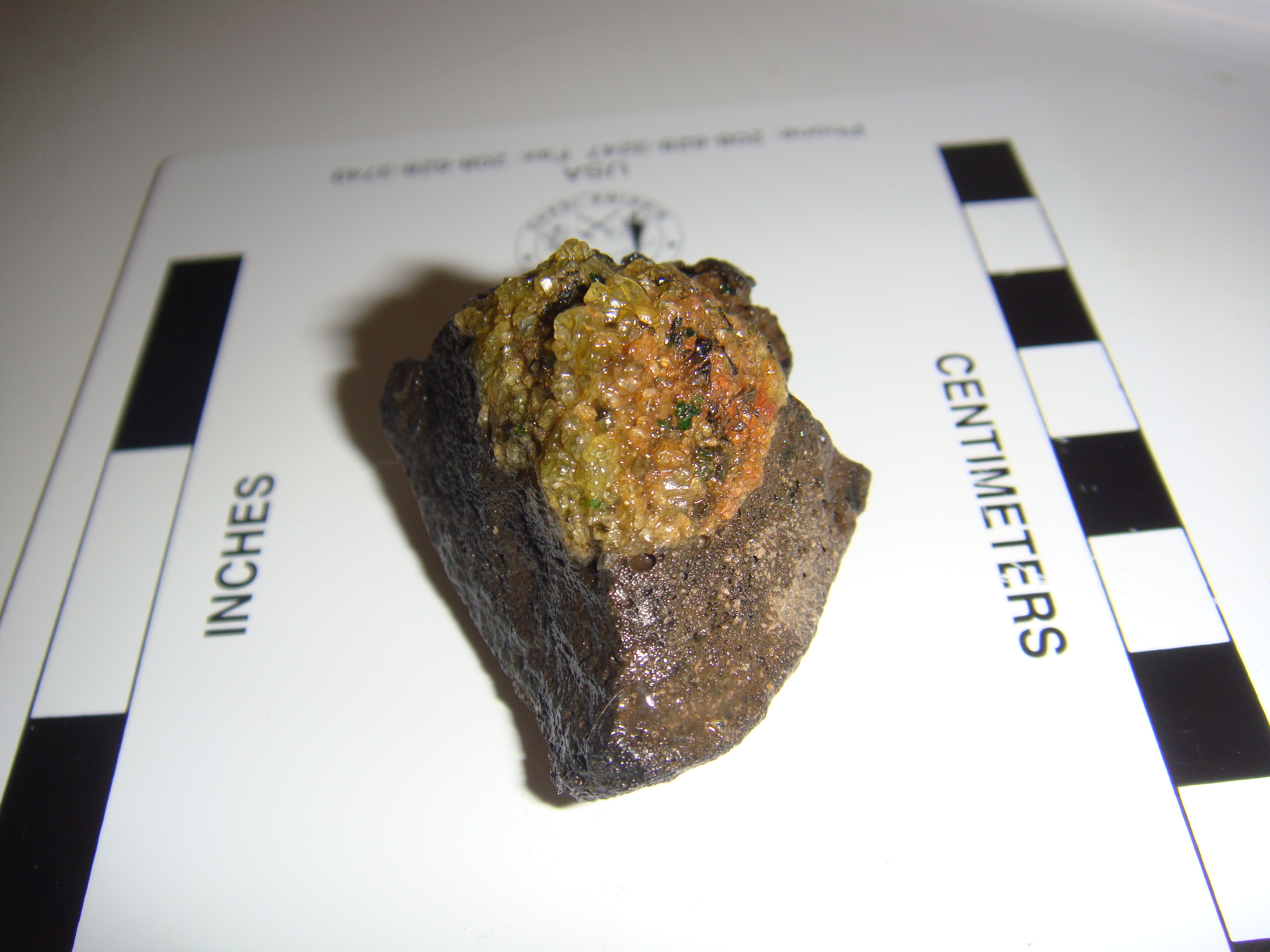
Olivine weathering to iddingsite within a mantle xenolith

Hydrolysis (also called incongruent dissolution) is a form of chemical weathering in which only part of a mineral is taken into solution. The rest of the mineral is transformed into a new solid material, such as a clay mineral. For example, forsterite (magnesium olivine) is hydrolyzed into solid brucite and dissolved silicic acid:

Mg_{2}SiO_{4} + 4 H_{2}O ⇌ 2 Mg(OH)_{2} + H_{4}SiO_{4}
forsterite + water ⇌ brucite + silicic acid

Most hydrolysis during weathering of minerals is acid hydrolysis, in which protons (hydrogen ions), which are present in acidic water, attack chemical bonds in mineral crystals. The bonds between different cations and oxygen ions in minerals differ in strength, and the weakest will be attacked first. The result is that minerals in igneous rock weather in roughly the same order in which they were originally formed (Bowen's Reaction Series). Relative bond strength is shown in the following table:

Bond	Relative strength
Si–O	2.4
Ti–O	1.8
Al–O	1.65
Fe^{+3}–O	1.4
Mg–O	0.9
Fe^{+2}–O	0.85
Mn–O	0.8
Ca–O	0.7
Na–O	0.35
K–O	0.25

This table is only a rough guide to order of weathering. Some minerals, such as illite, are unusually stable, while silica is unusually unstable given the strength of the silicon–oxygen bond.

Carbon dioxide that dissolves in water to form carbonic acid is the most important source of protons, but organic acids are also important natural sources of acidity. Acid hydrolysis from dissolved carbon dioxide is sometimes described as carbonation, and can result in weathering of the primary minerals to secondary carbonate minerals. For example, weathering of forsterite can produce magnesite instead of brucite via the reaction:

Mg_{2}SiO_{4} + 2 CO_{2} + 2 H_{2}O ⇌ 2 MgCO_{3} + H_{4}SiO_{4}
forsterite + carbon dioxide + water ⇌ magnesite + silicic acid in solution

Carbonic acid is consumed by silicate weathering, resulting in more alkaline solutions because of the bicarbonate. This is an important reaction in controlling the amount of CO_{2} in the atmosphere and can affect climate.

Aluminosilicates containing highly soluble cations, such as sodium or potassium ions, will release the cations as dissolved bicarbonates during acid hydrolysis:

2 KAlSi_{3}O_{8} + 2 H_{2}CO_{3} + 9 H_{2}O ⇌ Al_{2}Si_{2}O_{5}(OH)_{4} + 4 H_{4}SiO_{4} + 2 K^{+} + 2 HCO_{3}^{−}
orthoclase (aluminosilicate feldspar) + carbonic acid + water ⇌ kaolinite (a clay mineral) + silicic acid in solution + potassium and bicarbonate ions in solution

=== Oxidation ===
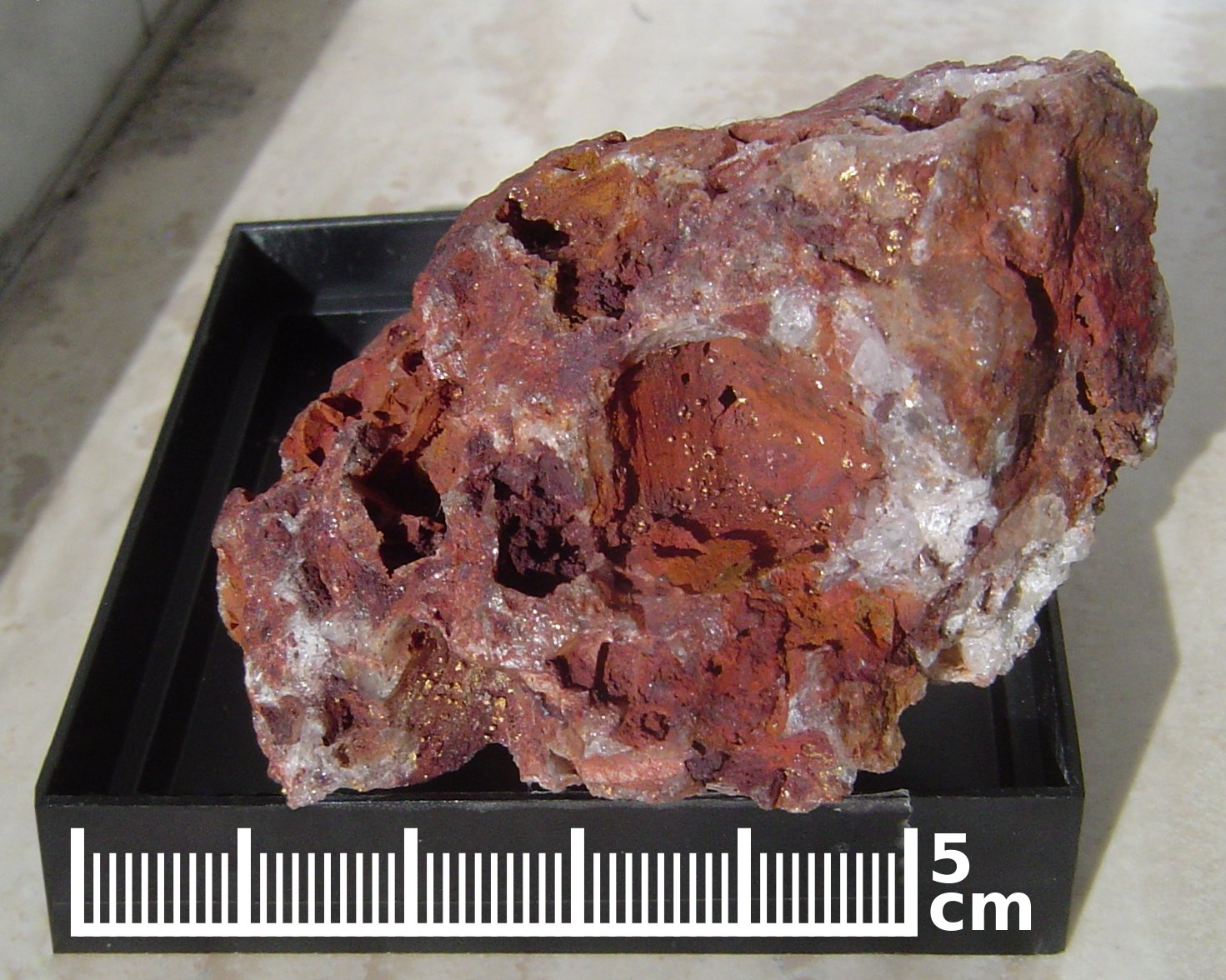
A pyrite cube has dissolved away from host rock, leaving gold particles behind.

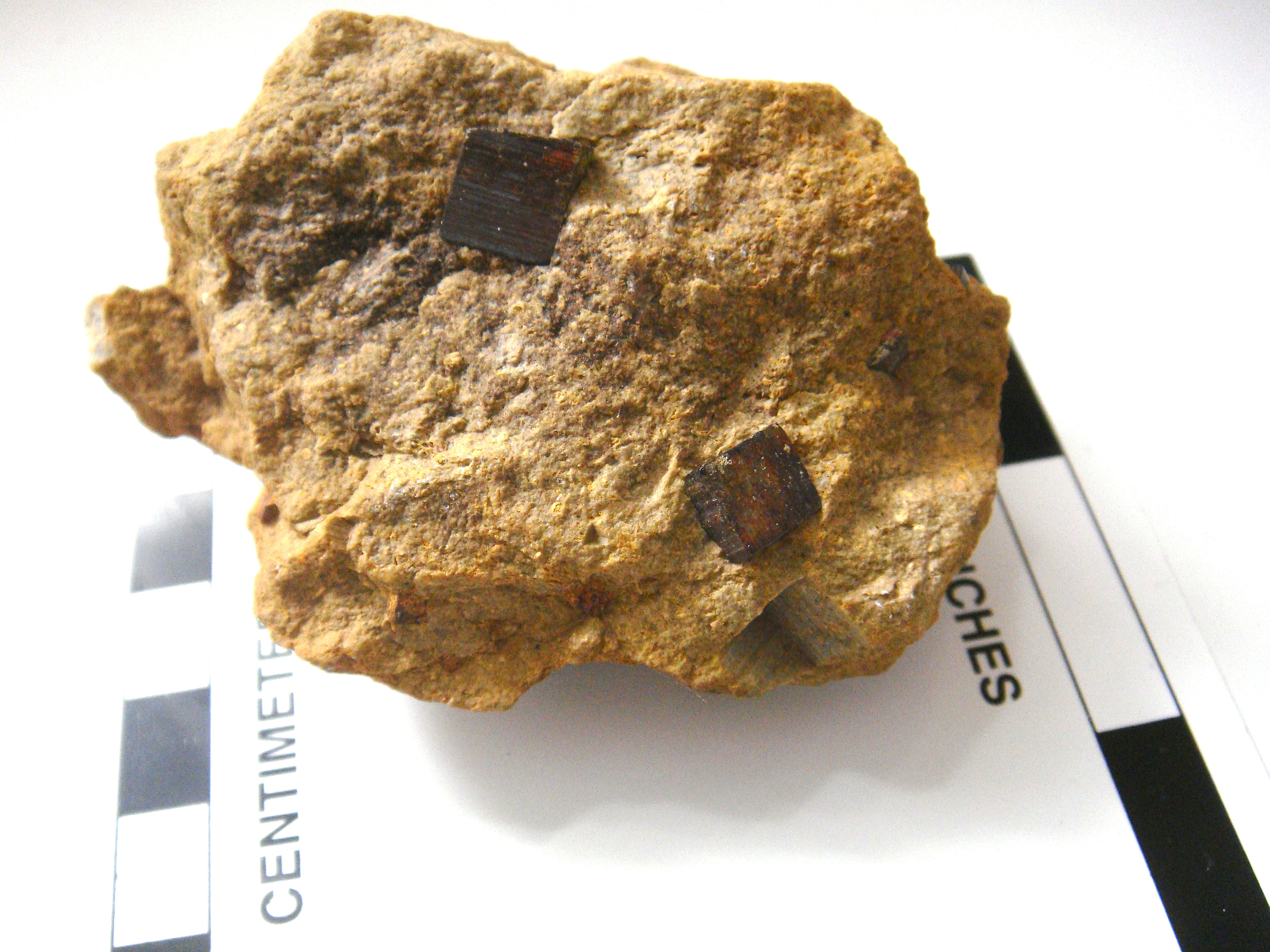
Oxidized pyrite cubes

Within the weathering environment, chemical oxidation of a variety of metals occurs. The most commonly observed is the oxidation of Fe^{2+} (iron) by oxygen and water to form Fe^{3+} oxides and hydroxides such as goethite, limonite, and hematite. This gives the affected rocks a reddish-brown coloration on the surface which crumbles easily and weakens the rock. Many other metallic ores and minerals oxidize and hydrate to produce colored deposits, as does sulfur during the weathering of sulfide minerals such as chalcopyrites or CuFeS_{2} oxidizing to copper hydroxide and iron oxides.

=== Hydration ===
Mineral hydration is a form of chemical weathering that involves the rigid attachment of water molecules or H+ and OH- ions to the atoms and molecules of a mineral. No significant dissolution takes place. For example, iron oxides are converted to iron hydroxides and the hydration of anhydrite forms gypsum.

Bulk hydration of minerals is secondary in importance to dissolution, hydrolysis, and oxidation, but hydration of the crystal surface is the crucial first step in hydrolysis. A fresh surface of a mineral crystal exposes ions whose electrical charge attracts water molecules. Some of these molecules break into H+ that bonds to exposed anions (usually oxygen) and OH- that bonds to exposed cations. This further disrupts the surface, making it susceptible to various hydrolysis reactions. Additional protons replace cations exposed on the surface, freeing the cations as solutes. As cations are removed, silicon-oxygen and silicon-aluminium bonds become more susceptible to hydrolysis, freeing silicic acid and aluminium hydroxides to be leached away or to form clay minerals. Laboratory experiments show that weathering of feldspar crystals begins at dislocations or other defects on the surface of the crystal, and that the weathering layer is only a few atoms thick. Diffusion within the mineral grain does not appear to be significant.

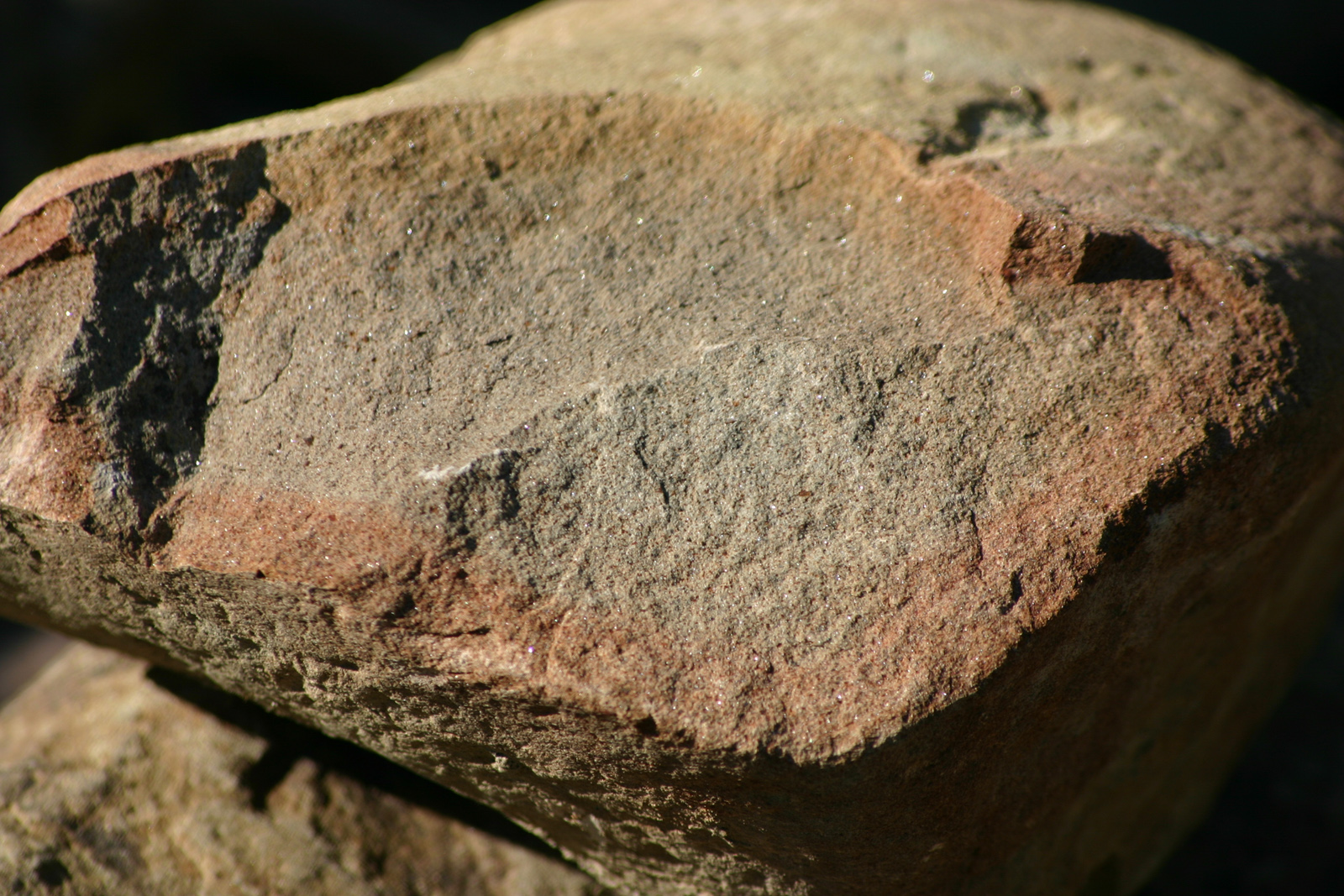
A freshly broken rock shows differential chemical weathering (probably mostly oxidation) progressing inward. This piece of sandstone was found in glacial drift near Angelica, New York.

=== Biological ===
Mineral weathering can also be initiated or accelerated by soil microorganisms. Soil organisms make up about 10 mg/cm^{3} of typical soils, and laboratory experiments have demonstrated that albite and muscovite weather twice as fast in live versus sterile soil. Lichens on rocks are among the most effective biological agents of chemical weathering. For example, an experimental study on hornblende granite in New Jersey, US, demonstrated a 3x – 4x increase in weathering rate under lichen covered surfaces compared to recently exposed bare rock surfaces.

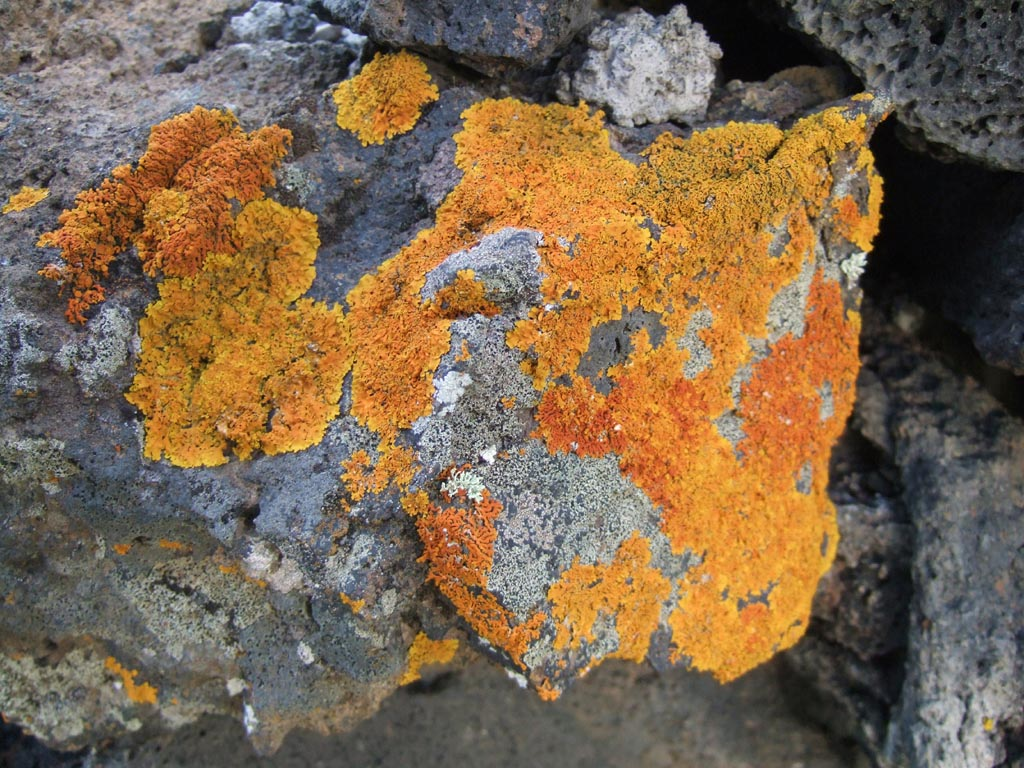
Biological weathering of basalt by lichen, La Palma

The most common forms of biological weathering result from the release of chelating compounds (such as certain organic acids and siderophores) and of carbon dioxide and organic acids by plants. Roots can build up the carbon dioxide level to 30% of all soil gases, aided by adsorption of CO_{2} on clay minerals and the very slow diffusion rate of CO_{2} out of the soil. The CO_{2} and organic acids help break down aluminium- and iron-containing compounds in the soils beneath them. Roots have a negative electrical charge balanced by protons in the soil next to the roots, and these can be exchanged for essential nutrient cations such as potassium. Decaying remains of dead plants in soil may form organic acids which, when dissolved in water, cause chemical weathering. Chelating compounds, mostly low molecular weight organic acids, are capable of removing metal ions from bare rock surfaces, with aluminium and silicon being particularly susceptible. The ability to break down bare rock allows lichens to be among the first colonizers of dry land. The accumulation of chelating compounds can easily affect surrounding rocks and soils, and may lead to podsolisation of soils.

The symbiotic mycorrhizal fungi associated with tree root systems can release inorganic nutrients from minerals such as apatite or biotite and transfer these nutrients to the trees, thus contributing to tree nutrition. It was also recently evidenced that bacterial communities can impact mineral stability leading to the release of inorganic nutrients. A large range of bacterial strains or communities from diverse genera have been reported to be able to colonize mineral surfaces or to weather minerals, and for some of them a plant growth promoting effect has been demonstrated. The demonstrated or hypothesised mechanisms used by bacteria to weather minerals include several oxidoreduction and dissolution reactions as well as the production of weathering agents, such as protons, organic acids and chelating molecules.

== Ocean floor ==
Weathering of basaltic oceanic crust differs in important respects from weathering in the atmosphere. Weathering is relatively slow, with basalt becoming less dense, at a rate of about 15% per 100 million years. The basalt becomes hydrated, and is enriched in total and ferric iron, magnesium, and sodium at the expense of silica, titanium, aluminum, ferrous iron, and calcium.

== Buildings ==
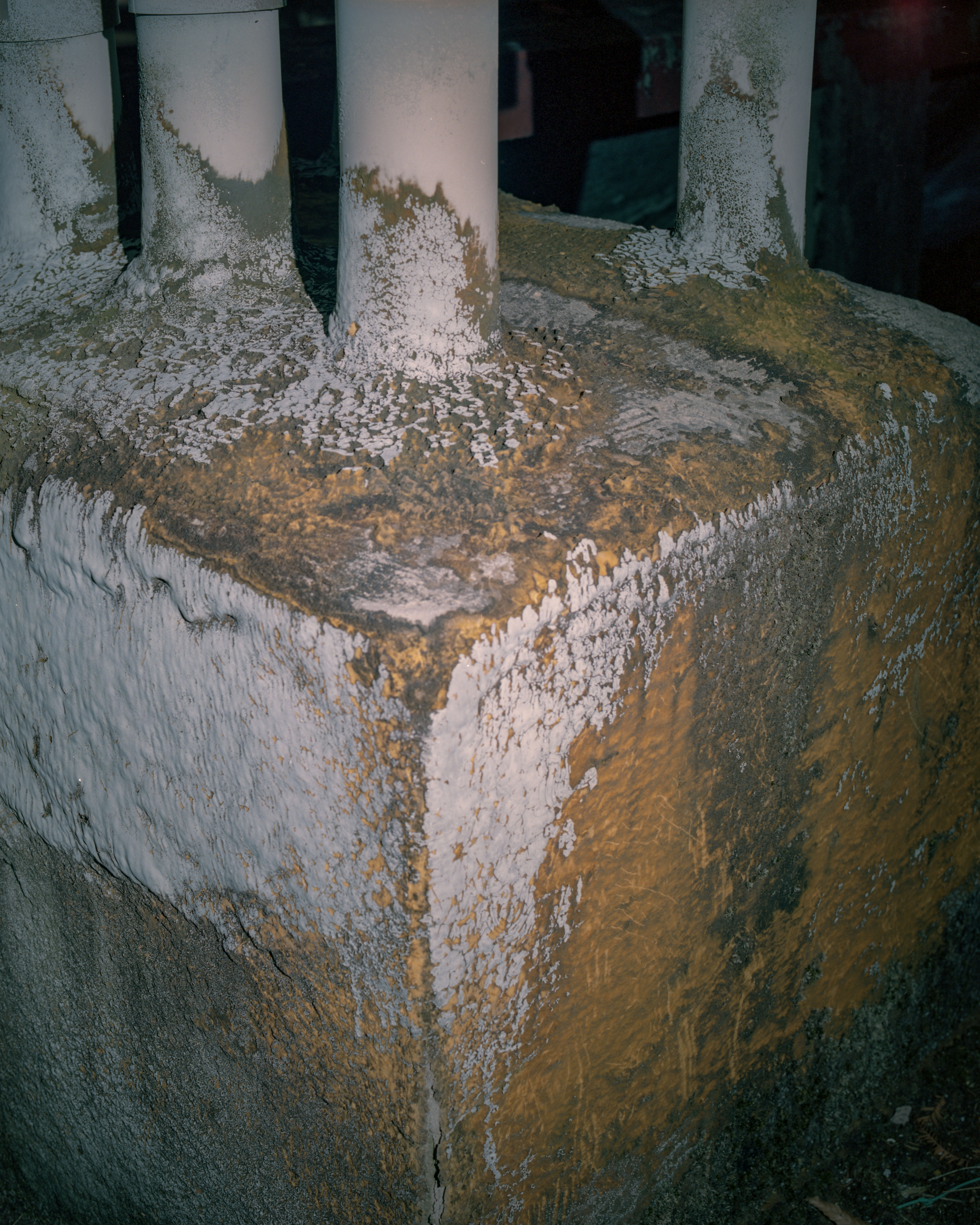
Concrete damaged by acid rain

Buildings made of any stone, brick or concrete are susceptible to the same weathering agents as any exposed rock surface. Also statues, monuments and ornamental stonework can be badly damaged by natural weathering processes. This is accelerated in areas severely affected by acid rain.

Building fires can also weather stone materials exposed to high temperatures through several processes, such as the anisotropic thermal expansion of particles in polymineral rocks, the polymorphic transformation of grains in monomineral rocks, and partial phase changes caused by the melting of certain constituents (leading to sintering). Additionally, the development of internal pore gas pressure due to mineral decomposition further contributes to this damage. These processes considerably degrade the physical and mechanical properties of rock materials used in construction. Furthermore, the extinguishing of fires by firefighters using water can induce thermal shocks, further compromising the integrity of the rock.

Accelerated building weathering may be a threat to the environment and occupant safety. Design strategies can moderate the impact of environmental effects, such as using of pressure-moderated rain screening, ensuring that the HVAC system is able to effectively control humidity accumulation and selecting concrete mixes with reduced water content to minimize the impact of freeze-thaw cycles.

== Soil ==
Granitic rock, the most abundant crystalline rock exposed at the Earth's surface, begins weathering with the destruction of hornblende. Biotite then weathers to vermiculite, and finally oligoclase and microcline are destroyed. All are converted into a mixture of clay minerals and iron oxides. The resulting soil is depleted in calcium, sodium, and ferrous iron compared with the bedrock, and magnesium is reduced by 40% and silicon by 15%. At the same time, the soil is enriched in aluminium and potassium by at least 50%; by titanium, whose abundance triples, and ferric iron, whose abundance increases by an order of magnitude compared with the bedrock.

Basaltic rock is more easily weathered than granitic rock due to its formation at higher temperatures and drier conditions. The fine grain size and presence of volcanic glass also hasten weathering. In tropical settings, it rapidly weathers to clay minerals, aluminium hydroxides, and titanium-enriched iron oxides. Because most basalt is relatively poor in potassium, the basalt weathers directly to potassium-poor montmorillonite, then to kaolinite. Where leaching is continuous and intense, as in rain forests, the final weathering product is bauxite, the principal ore of aluminium. Where rainfall is intense but seasonal, as in monsoon climates, the final weathering product is iron- and titanium-rich laterite. Conversion of kaolinite to bauxite occurs only with intense leaching, as ordinary river water is in equilibrium with kaolinite.

Soil formation requires between 100 and 1,000 years, a brief interval in geologic time. As a result, some formations show numerous paleosol (fossil soil) beds. For example, the Willwood Formation of Wyoming contains over 1,000 paleosol layers in a 770 meters (2,530 ft) section representing 3.5 million years of geologic time. Paleosols have been identified in formations as old as Archean (over 2.5 billion years in age). They are difficult to recognize in the geologic record. Indications that a sedimentary bed is a paleosol include a gradational lower boundary and sharp upper boundary, the presence of much clay, poor sorting with few sedimentary structures, rip-up clasts in overlying beds, and desiccation cracks containing material from higher beds.

The degree of weathering of soil can be expressed as the chemical index of alteration, defined as 100 Al_{2}O_{3}/(Al_{2}O_{3} + CaO + Na_{2}O + K_{2}O). This varies from 47 for unweathered upper crust rock to 100 for fully weathered material.

== Wood, paint and plastic ==
Wood can be physically and chemically weathered by hydrolysis and other processes relevant to minerals and is highly susceptible to ultraviolet radiation from sunlight. This induces photochemical reactions that degrade its surface. These also significantly weather paint and plastics.

== Gallery ==
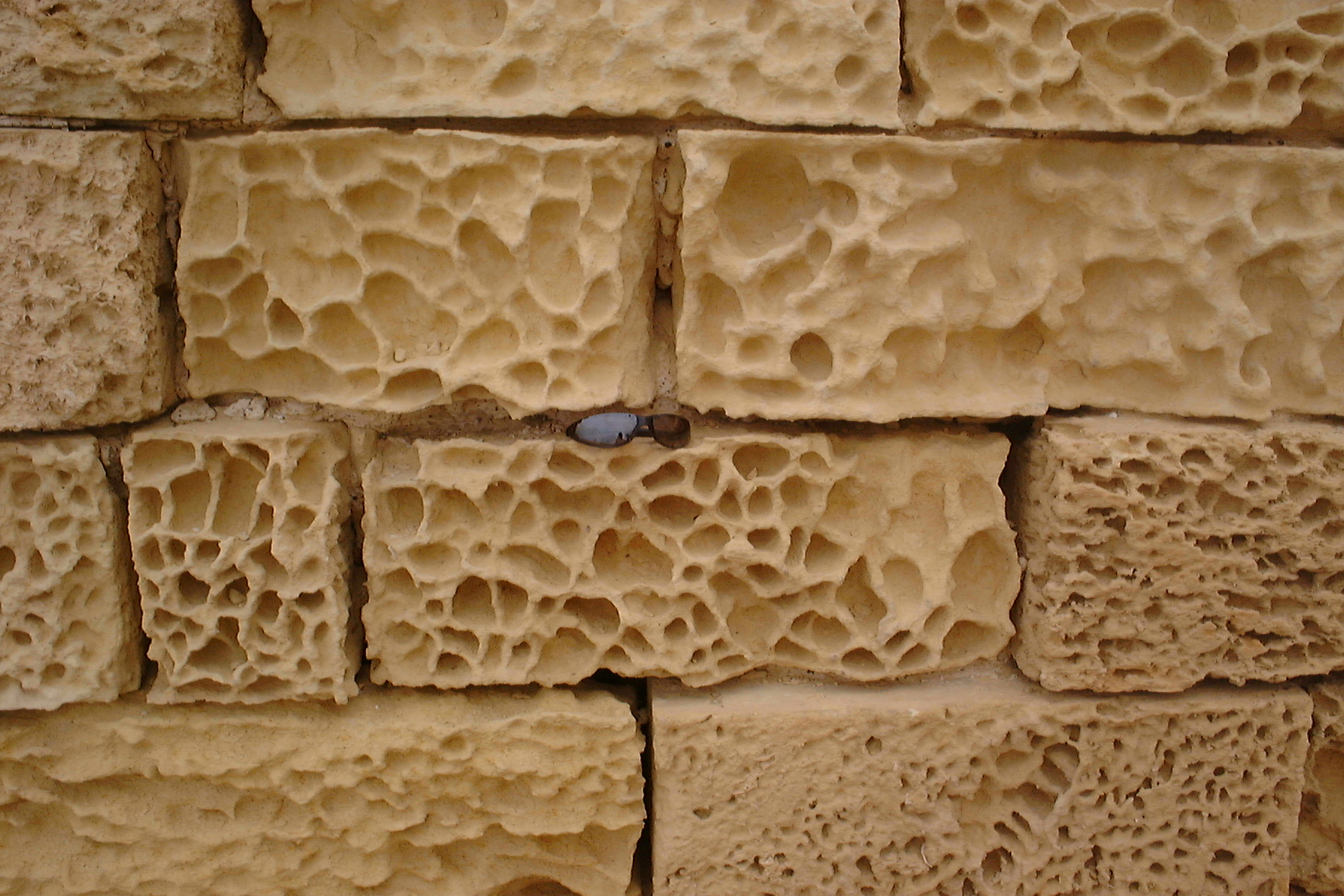
Salt weathering of building stone on the island of Gozo, Malta

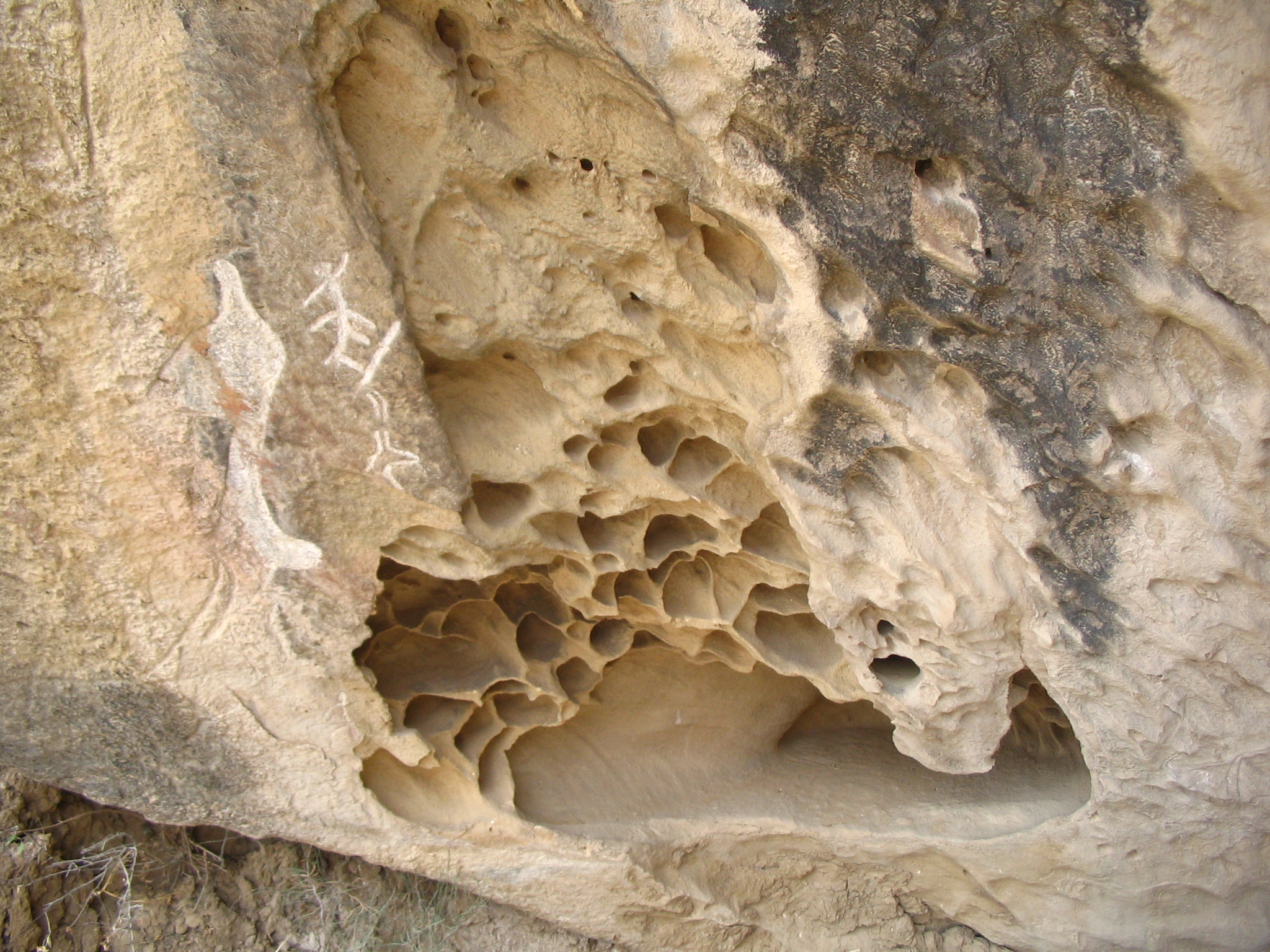
Salt weathering of sandstone near Qobustan, Azerbaijan

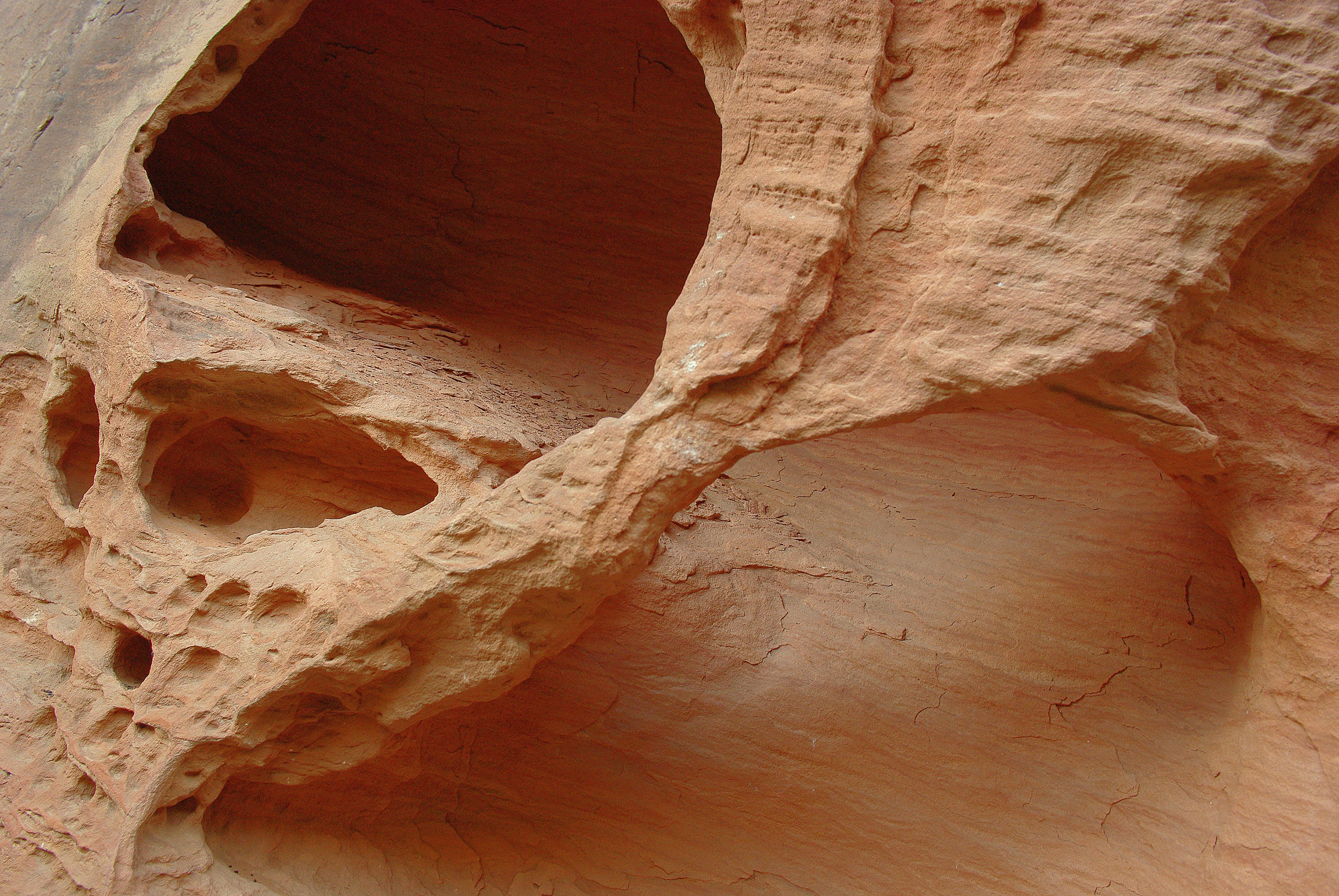
Permian sandstone wall near Sedona, Arizona, United States, weathered into a small alcove

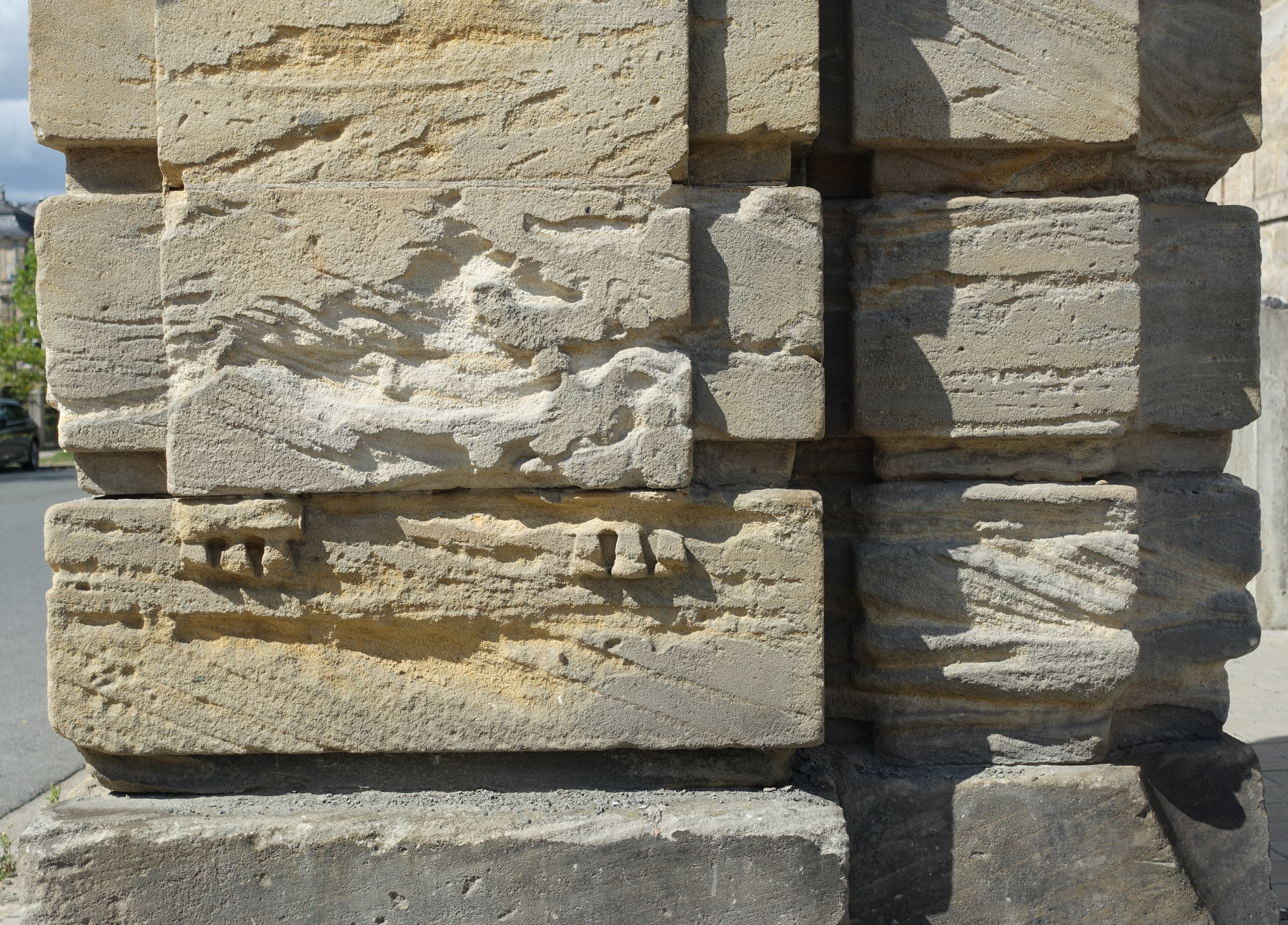
Weathering on a sandstone pillar in Bayreuth

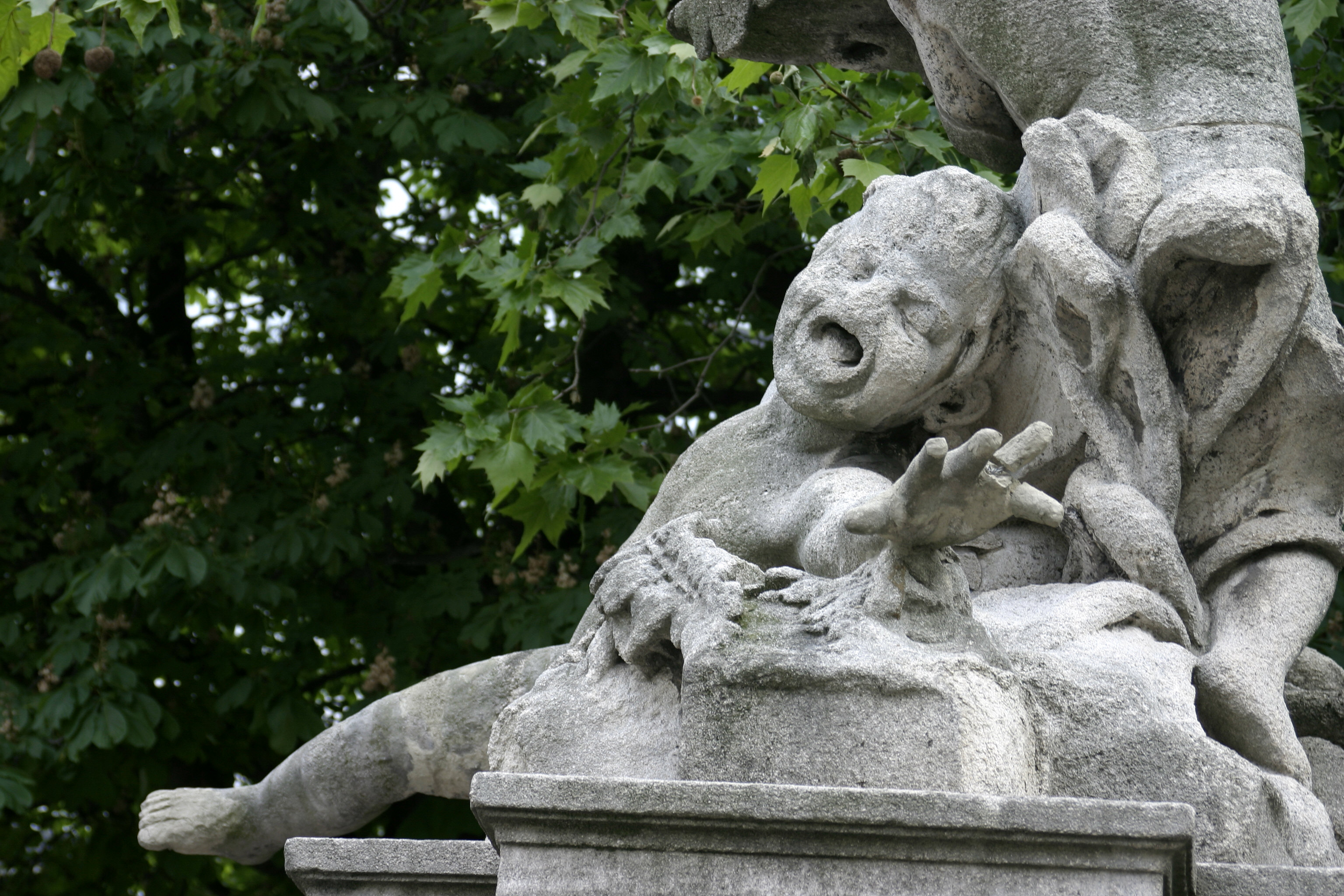
Weathering effect of acid rain on statues

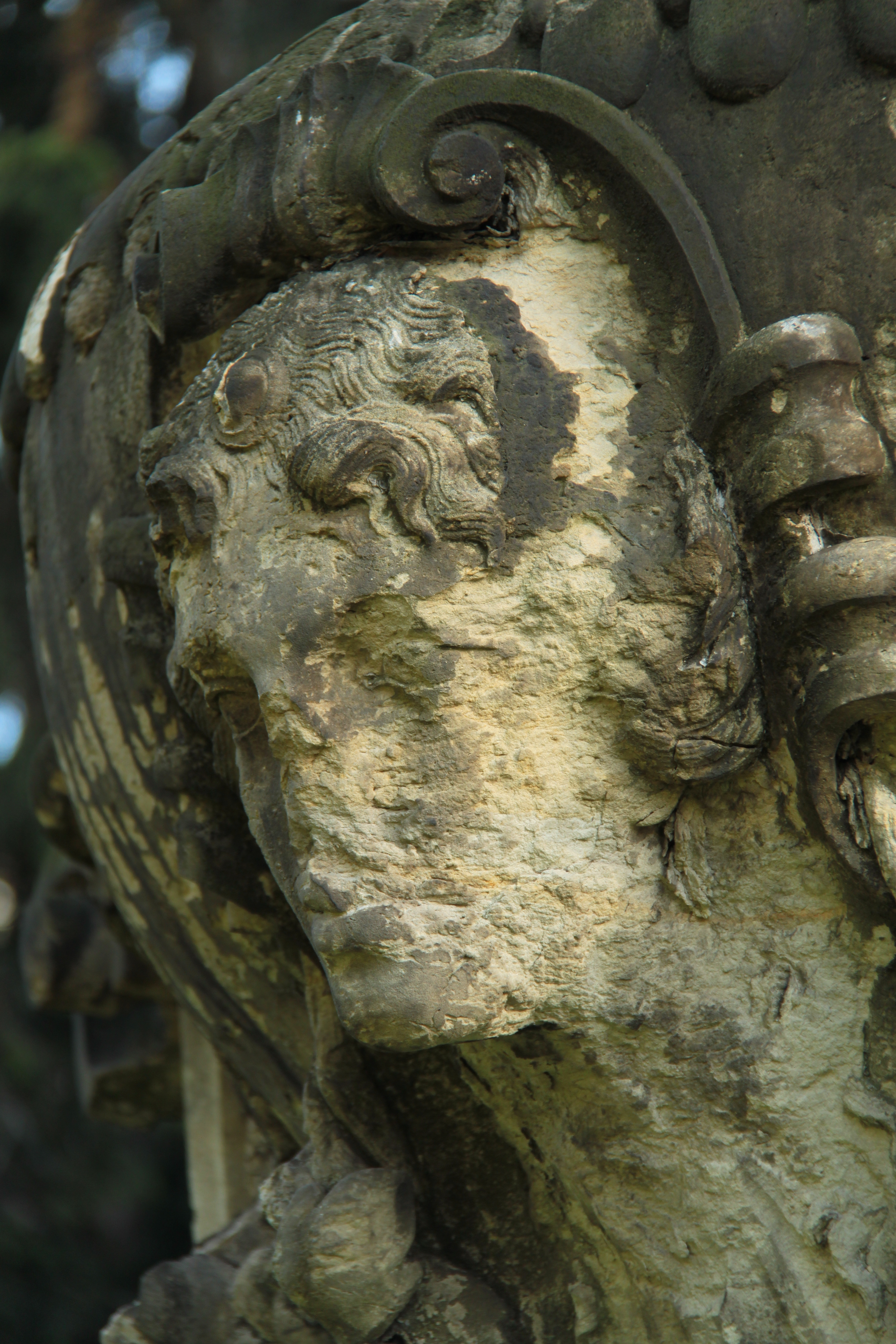
Weathering effect on a sandstone statue in Dresden, Germany

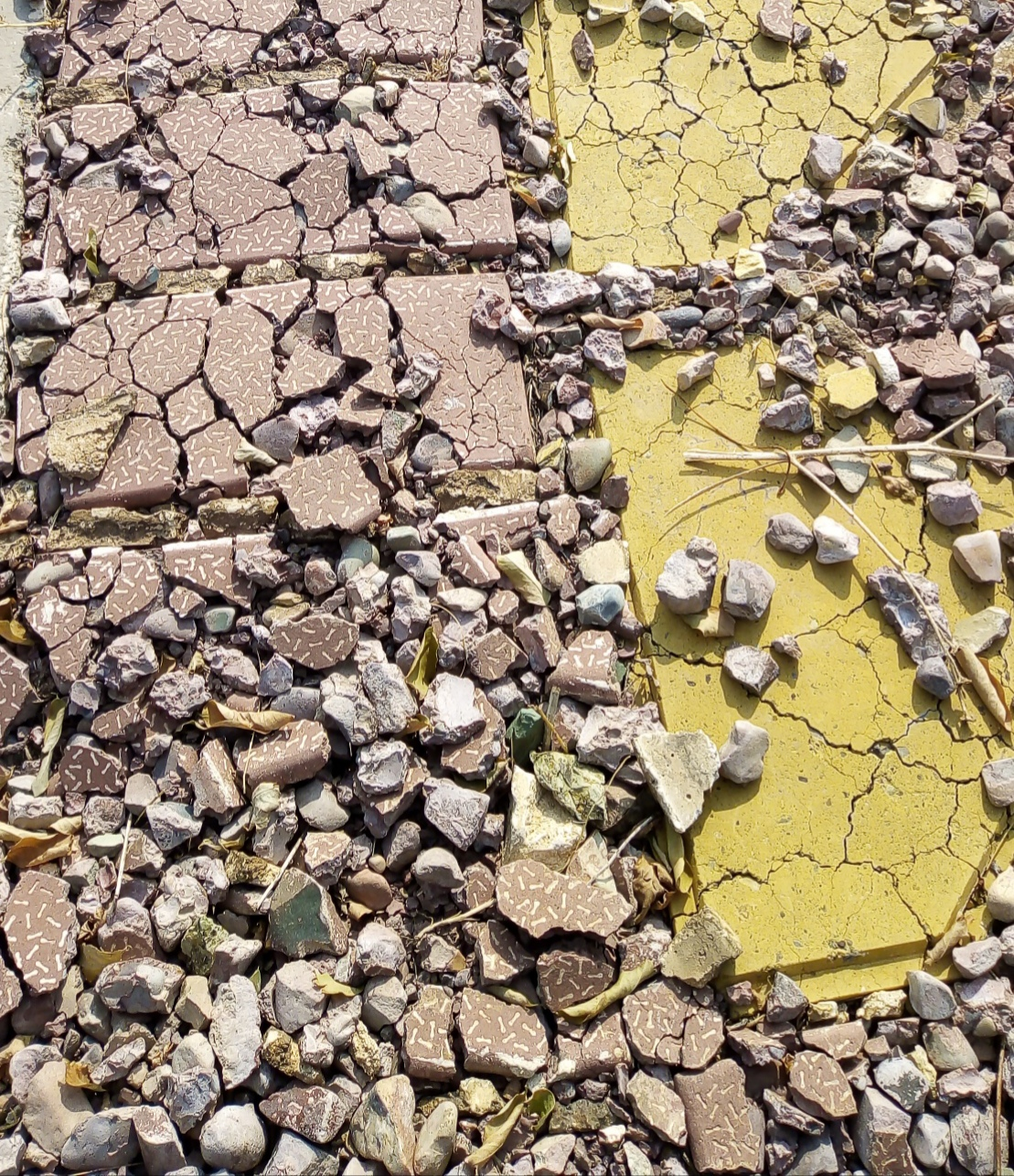
Physical weathering of the pavements of Azad University Science and Research Branch, which is located in the heights of Tehran, the capital of Iran

== See also ==
- Aeolian processes – Processes due to wind activity
- Biorhexistasy – Soil formation theory
- Case hardening of rocks – Rock surface weathering phenomenon
- Decomposition – Process of breaking down organic matter
- Environmental chamber – Enclosure for testing materials under controlled conditions
- Eluvium – End product of rock weathering
- Exfoliating granite – Granite spalling in superficial layers due to temperature cycles
- Factors of polymer weathering – Phenomenon in chemistry
- Metasomatism – Chemical alteration of a rock by hydrothermal and other fluids
- Meteorite weathering – Terrestrial alteration of a meteorite
- Pedogenesis – Process of soil formation
- Residuum (geology) – Weathered rock that is not transported by erosion
- Reverse weathering – Formation of authigenic clay minerals
- Soil production function
- Space weathering – Type of weathering
- Spheroidal weathering – Form of chemical weathering that affects jointed bedrock
- Weather testing of polymers – Controlled polymer and polymer coating degradation
- Weathering steel – Steel whose surface rust inhibits further rusting
