= Robert Garrels =

American geochemist

Robert Minard Garrels (August 24, 1916 – March 8, 1988) was an American geochemist. Garrels applied experimental physical chemistry data and techniques to geology and geochemistry problems. The book Solutions, Minerals, and Equilibria co-authored in 1965 by Garrels and Charles L. Christ revolutionized aqueous geochemistry.

Garrels earned a bachelor's degree in geology from the University of Michigan in 1937. He went on to earn an M.S. degree from Northwestern University in 1939, his thesis work was on iron ores of Newfoundland in 1938. His Ph.D. was awarded in 1941 based on lab studies of complex formation between lead and chloride ions in aqueous solution.

== Life and career ==
Garrels worked for the United States Geological Survey during World War II and returned to teach at Northwestern until 1952. Also in 1952, he published a technical paper, "Origin and Classification of Chemical Sediments in Terms of pH and Oxidation-Reduction Potentials" with William C. Krumbein, which was to become a classic study of sedimentary rocks from a physical chemistry viewpoint. This and following works revolutionized sedimentary and aqueous geochemistry.

He joined the United States Geological Survey again for a time, but returned to academia at Harvard University in 1955. He became a full professor in 1957 and later department chair. His work and the lab he supervised at Harvard produced many classic works, including the Solutions, Minerals, and Equilibria text. Here, between 1960 and 1962, he, along with his colleagues, published the classic studies:

- "Oxidation of Pyrite by Iron Sulfate Solutions"
- "Stability of Some Carbonates at 25°C and One Atmosphere Total Pressure"
- "Control of Carbonate Solubility by Carbonate Complexes"
- "A Chemical Model for Sea Water at 25°C and One Atmosphere Total Pressure"

He returned to Northwestern University in 1965 and conducted influential studies on the silicate and carbonate buffering of seawaters, the genesis of groundwaters and the theoretical treatment of irreversible reactions in geochemical processes.

In 1969, he moved to the Scripps Institution of Oceanography and later to the University of Hawaiʻi at Mānoa. During this time he worked on thermodynamic properties of silicate minerals and also published "Cycling of Carbon, Sulfur, and Oxygen through Geologic Time" with Ed Perry in 1974.

In 1974, he returned to Northwestern University and published important studies on the sulfur and carbon isotopic compositions of Phanerozoic rocks with Abraham Lerman and Frederick T. Mackenzie.

Garrels had broad interests beyond geology. He enjoyed travel and wine. He was athletic, holding the world high jump record for men over 57 years of age. He was a poet-scientist:

Cycle of P
by Robert M. Garrels

I put some P into the sea
the biomass did swell

But settling down soon overcame
and P went down toward Hell

From Purgatory soon released
it moved up to the land

To make a perfect rose for thee
to carry in thy hand

But roses wilt and die you know
then P falls on the ground

Gobbled up as ferric P
a nasty brown compound

The world is moral still you know
and Nature's wheels do grind

Put ferric P into the sea
and a rose someday you'll find

He moved to the University of South Florida at St. Petersburg in 1979, holding the St. Petersburg Progress Chair in Marine Science, and spent summers at the Université Louis Pasteur, Strasbourg; the Université Libre, Brussels; and Yale, where he held an adjunct professorship. During this time he published "The Carbonate–Silicate Geochemical Cycle and Its Effect on Atmospheric Carbon Dioxide over the Past 100 Million Years" in 1983. This concerned the BLAG model, named for the collaborators including Tony Lasaga and Robert Berner. He continued to be active while fighting cancer, publishing "Modeling Atmospheric O_{2} in the Global Sedimentary Redox Cycle" (1986) and "A Model for the Deposition of the Microbanded Precambrian Iron Formations." (1987)

== Awards and honors ==
- 1961 – Election to the National Academy of Sciences
- 1962 – President of the Geochemical Society
- 1966 – Received the Arthur L. Day Medal of the Geological Society of America
- 1969 – Honorary doctorate from the Université Libre de Bruxelles
- 1973 – Received the V. M. Goldschmidt Award of the Geochemical Society
- 1976 – Honorary doctorate from the Université Louis Pasteur, Strasbourg, France
- 1978 – Received the Penrose Medal of the Geological Society of America
- 1980 – Honorary doctorate from the University of Michigan, Ann Arbor, Michigan, US
- 1981 – Received the Wollaston Medal of the Geological Society of London
- 1981 – Received the Roebling Medal of the Mineralogical Society of America

== Selected publications ==
- A Textbook of Geology, Harper's Geoscience Series (1951)
- Behavior of Colorado Plateau uranium minerals during oxidation U.S. Geological Survey Trace Elements Investigations Report No. 588 (1956)
- Mineral Equilibria at Low Temperature and Pressure, Harper (1960)
- Solutions, Minerals, and Equilibria with Charles L. Christ (1965) (2nd ed. Freeman Cooper Co, 1982 and revised ed 1990) ISBN 0-86720-148-7 (1990 ed.)
- Evolution of Sedimentary Rocks with Fred Mackenzie; Norton, (1971) (ISBN 0-393-09959-8)
- Water the Web of Life with Cynthia Garrels; Norton (1972) (ISBN 0-393-09407-3)
- Chemical cycles and the global environment: Assessing human influences with Cynthia Garrels and F. T. Mackenzie W.; Kaufmann (1975) (ISBN 0-913232-29-7)
- Thermodynamic Values at Low Temperature for Natural Inorganic Materials: An Uncritical Summary, with Terri L. Woods; Oxford University Press (1986) ISBN 0-19-504888-1
