= Charles L. Christ =

American geochemist and mineralogist (1916–1980)

- Born: March 12, 1916; Baltimore, Maryland
- Died: June 29, 1980 (aged 64); Palo Alto, California
- Education: Johns Hopkins University

Charles Louis Christ (March 12, 1916 – June 29, 1980) was an American scientist, geochemist and mineralogist.

== Education ==
He received his Bachelor's, Master's and Doctoral degrees from the Johns Hopkins University, completing his Ph.D. in 1940.

== Career ==
After receiving his degree, he worked for the General Electric Company as a research chemist in Pittsfield, Massachusetts. In September, 1941 he returned to academia as an instructor at Wesleyan University. From 1942 to 1945 he returned to Hopkins as an instructor and associate director of their C.Y. War Research Laboratory. The Laboratory was responsible for developing a super-conducting bolometer for the detection of infrared radiation. From 1946 to 1949 he was group leader for X-ray crystallography at the American Cyanamid Company in Stamford, Connecticut.

He was an employee of the U.S. Geological Survey from October, 1949 until his retirement in 1979. His research focused on minerals containing uranium, vanadium, and various rare elements. He was especially interested in hydrated borate minerals because of the crystal-chemical challenge they present.

He was a professorial lecturer at the George Washington University in Washington, D.C., from 1956 to 1965. In 1960, he published a set of rules governing the formation of complex borate polyanions that became known as Christ's Rules. In 1965, he moved from Washington, D.C. to the U.S. Geological Survey's offices in Menlo Park, California.

He was a Fellow of the Mineralogical Society of America and the Geological Society of America. He was an associate editor for The American Mineralogist from 1955 to 1959. In 1972 he was a visiting professor at the University of Hawaii.

== Awards and honors ==
- 1959 – Rockefeller Public Service Award
- In 1977, a new thallium mineral from the Carlin, Nevada, gold deposit, was named Christite in his honor

== Publications ==
- Solutions, Minerals, and Equilibria with Robert Garrels(1965) (2nd ed. Freeman Cooper Co, 1982 and revised ed 1990) ISBN 0-86720-148-7 (1990 ed.)
- Behavior of Colorado Plateau uranium minerals during oxidation with Robert Garrels. U.S. Geological Survey Trace Elements Investigations Report No. 588 (1956)
- Some observations on rutherfordine with Joan R. Clark. U.S. Geological Survey Trace Elements Investigations Report No. 584 (1956)
- Mineralogical applications of electron diffraction. I. Theory and techniques with Malcolm Ross. U.S. Geological Survey Trace Elements Investigations Report No. 597 (1958)
- The crystal structure of potassium metavanadate monohydrate, KVO3*H2O with Joan R. Clark and H.T. Evans Jr. U.S. Geological Survey Trace Elements Investigations Report No 406 (1954)
