= Tafoni =

Small to large indentations in vertical to steeply sloping granular rock

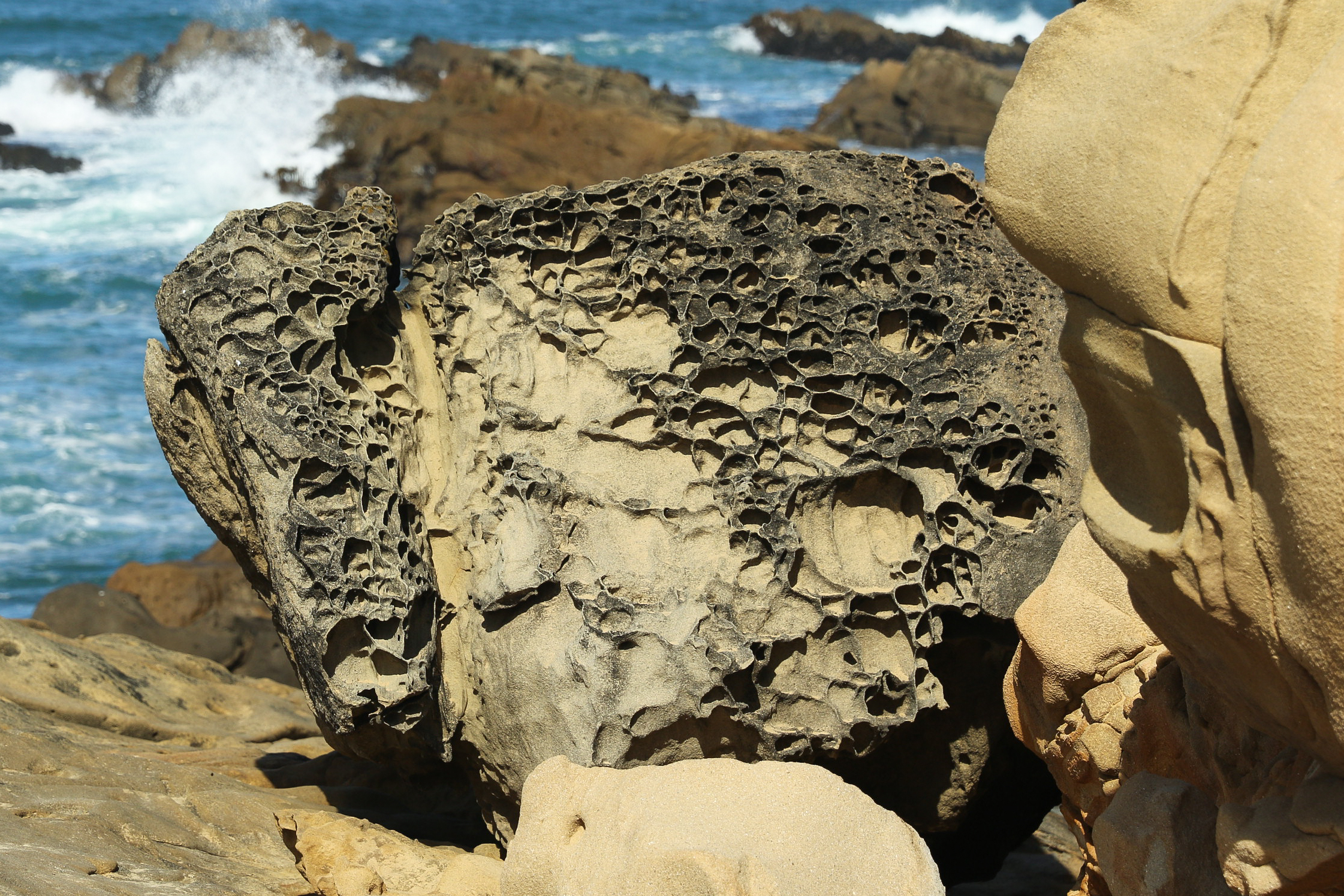
Tafoni at Salt Point State Park, Sonoma County, California.

Tafoni (singular: tafone) are cavities that develop in granular rock. Tafoni are commonly defined as small (less than 1 cm (0.39 in)) to large (greater than 1 meter (3.3 ft)) cavity features that develop in either natural or manmade, vertical to steeply sloping, exposures of granular rock (e.g., granite, sandstone) with smooth concave walls, and often round rims and openings. Recognized subcategories of tafoni include honeycomb, stonelace, alveolar (less than 2 cm (0.79 in)), sidewall, basal, nested, and relic tafoni. It is also commonly synonymous with nido d’ape roccioso in Italian.

Current research suggests they are polygenic in origin with some form of haloclastic control.

== Etymology ==
The etymology of the word tafoni is unclear. Tafoni may come from the Greek word τάφος taphos, tomb, or it may stem from a Corsican or Sicilian word for holes, taffoni, or from tafonare meaning to perforate. The earliest known publication of the term tafoni was in 1882.

== Distribution ==
Tafoni often occur in groups that can riddle a hillside, cliff, or other rock formation. They typically develop in siliceous, either coarse-grained (sandstone) or coarsely crystalline (granite), rock types. They also have been observed in lacustrine silts, tuffs, and conglomerates. They can be found in all climate types, but are most prolific in salt-rich environments, such as deserts and coastal zones. They have been found across the Earth, with dramatic forms found in the Jodhpur-Ajmer section of India's Thar Desert, Petra, Jordan, Coastal California, and Australia, and even in the Arctic regions and Antarctica. The common factors in the environments in which they are found are high salt concentrations and frequent or occasional desiccating conditions.

== Formation ==
Many explanations have been proposed for the origin of tafoni. They include marine abrasion; wind corrosion; mechanical weathering resulting from short-term temperature variations; chemical weathering of the interior of the rock (core-softening) under a protective crust (case-hardening) followed by mechanical removal of the softened material; biogeochemical weathering by lichens; temperature variations acting on salt efflorescence in coastal regions; and salt weathering. Starting in the 1970s, most workers have advocated salt weathering as the primary explanation for the formation of tafoni. Currently, tafoni are considered to be polygenetic in origin being the result of complex interaction of physical and chemical weathering processes, which include salt weathering and cyclic wetting and drying.

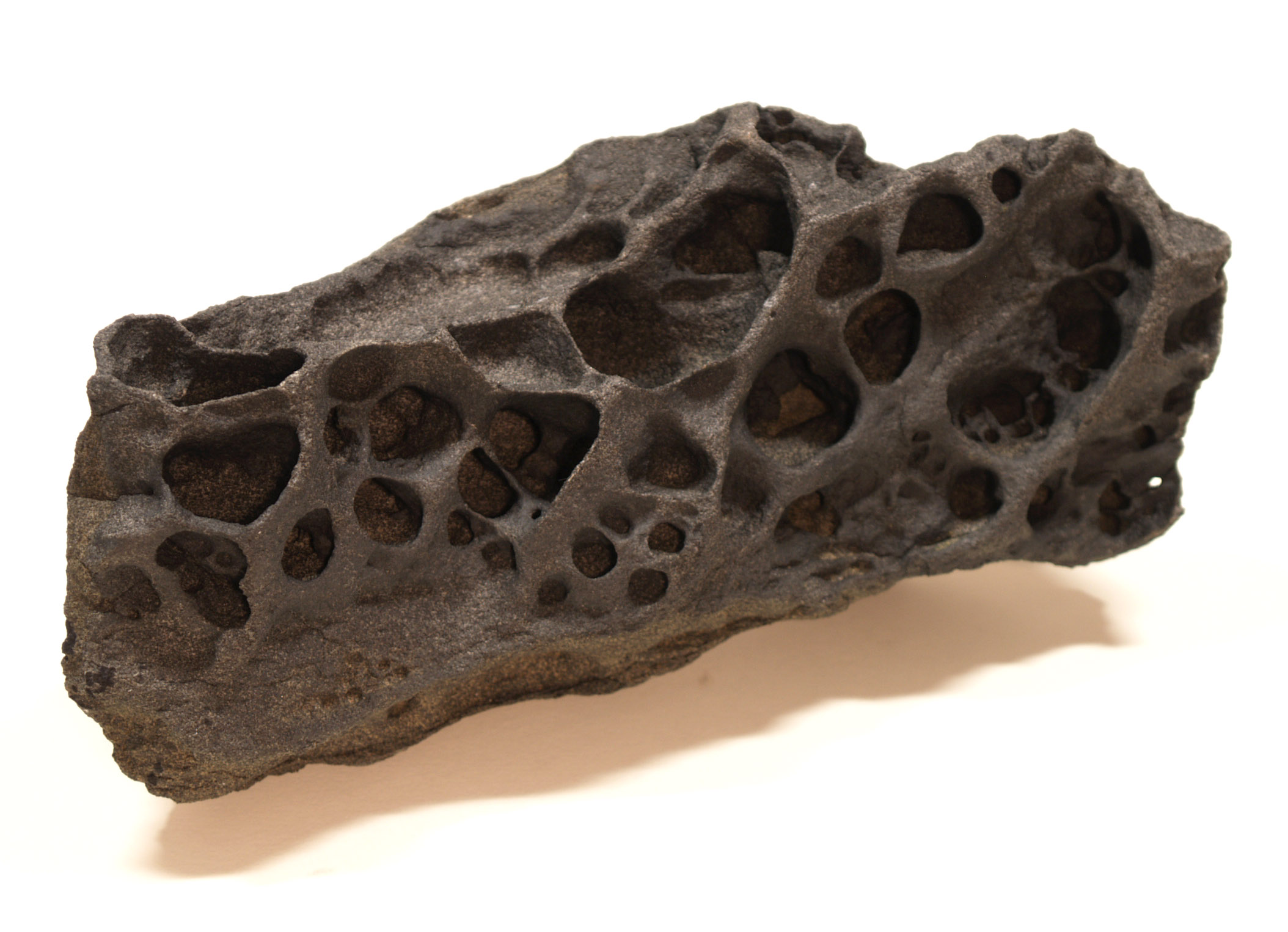
Tafoni from Antarctica

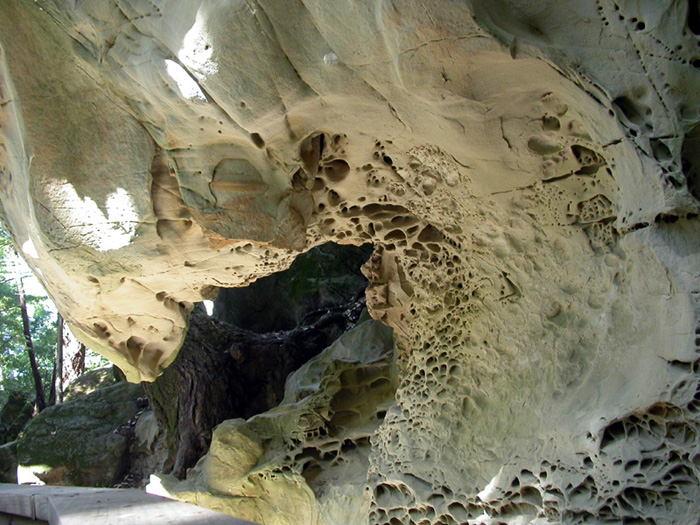
Tafoni formation in El Corte de Madera Creek Preserve, San Mateo County, California.

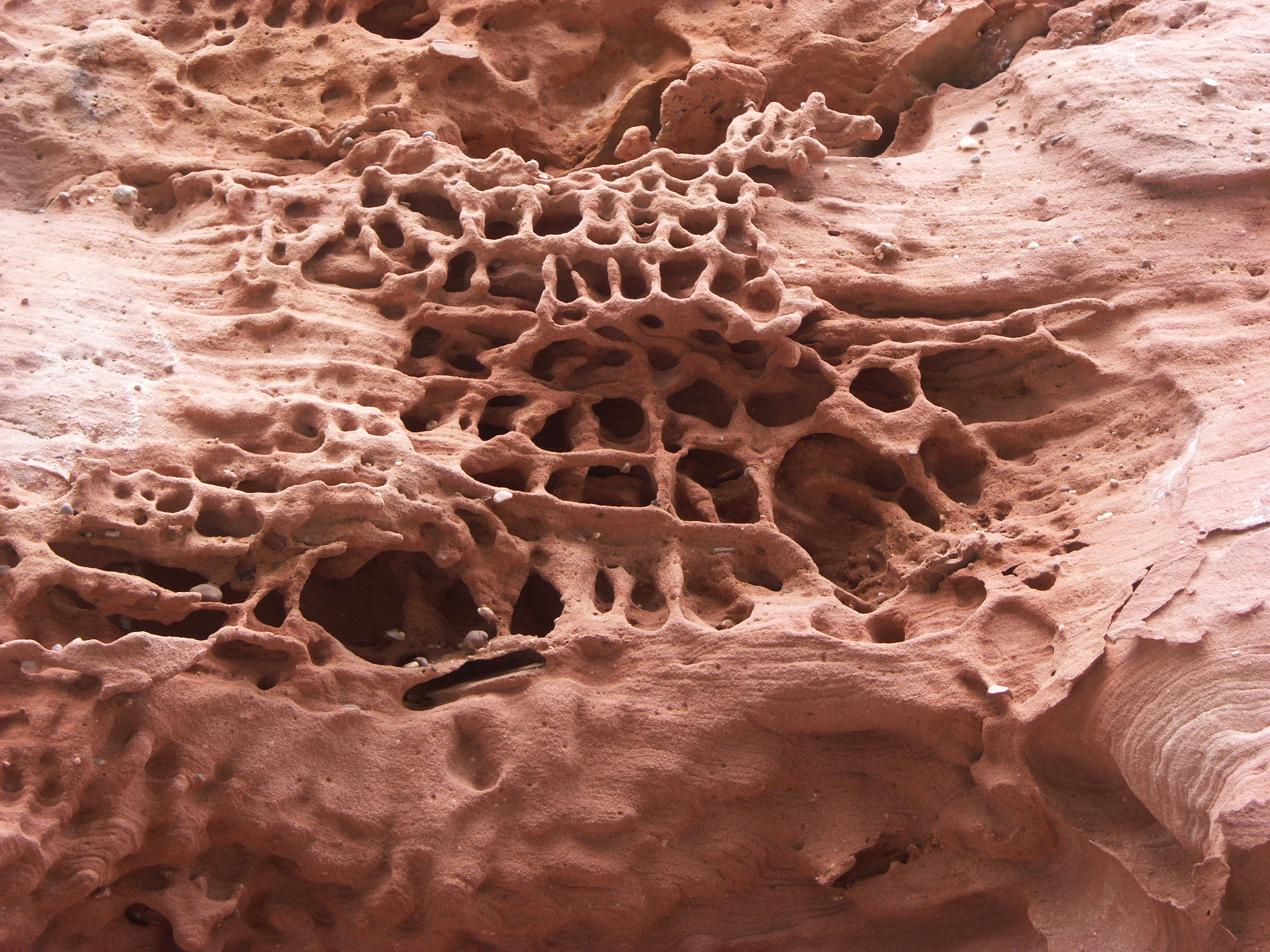
Tafoni in sandstone, Südpfalz, Rheinland-Pfalz, Germany

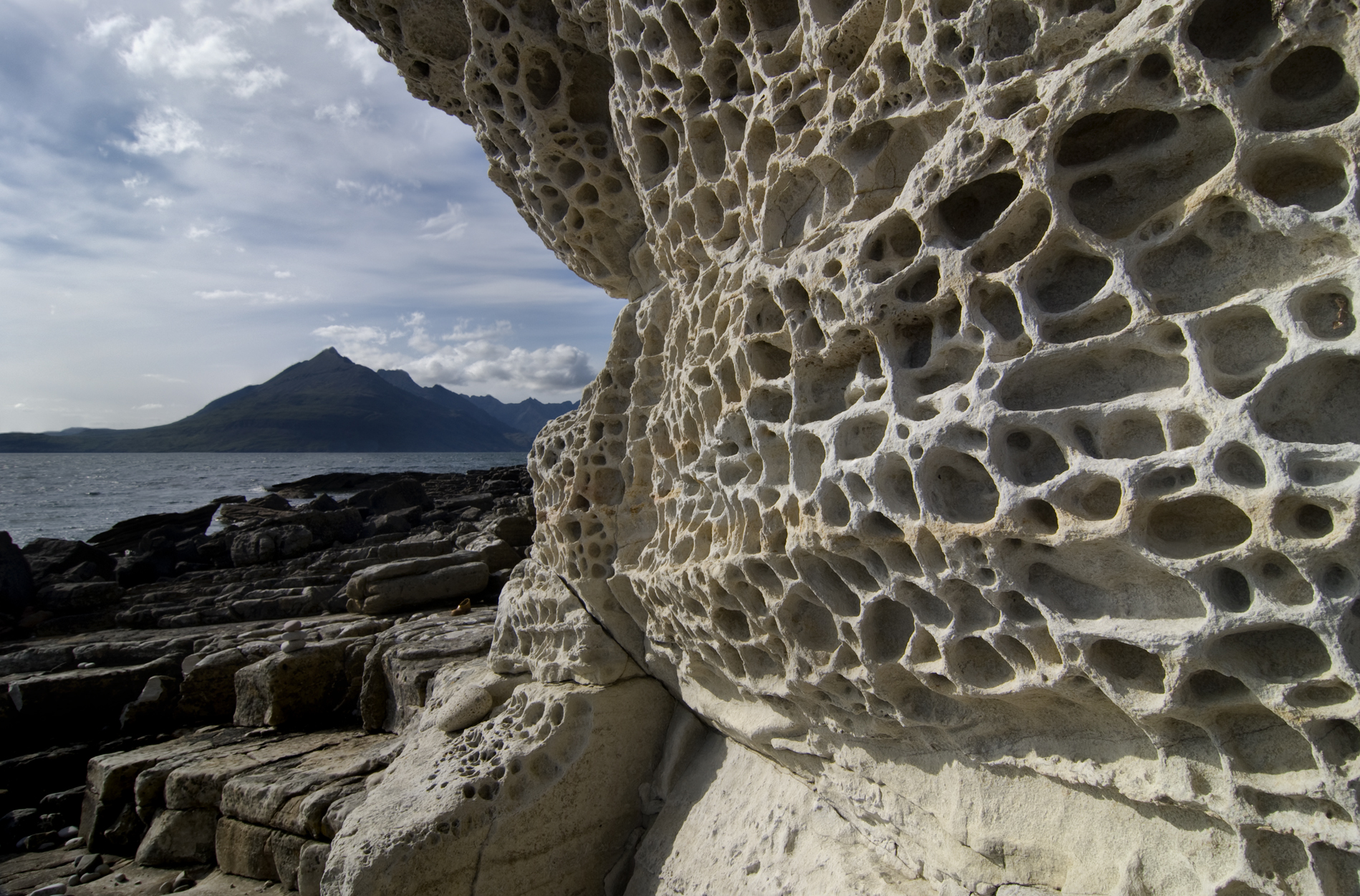
Tafoni at Elgol, Isle of Skye

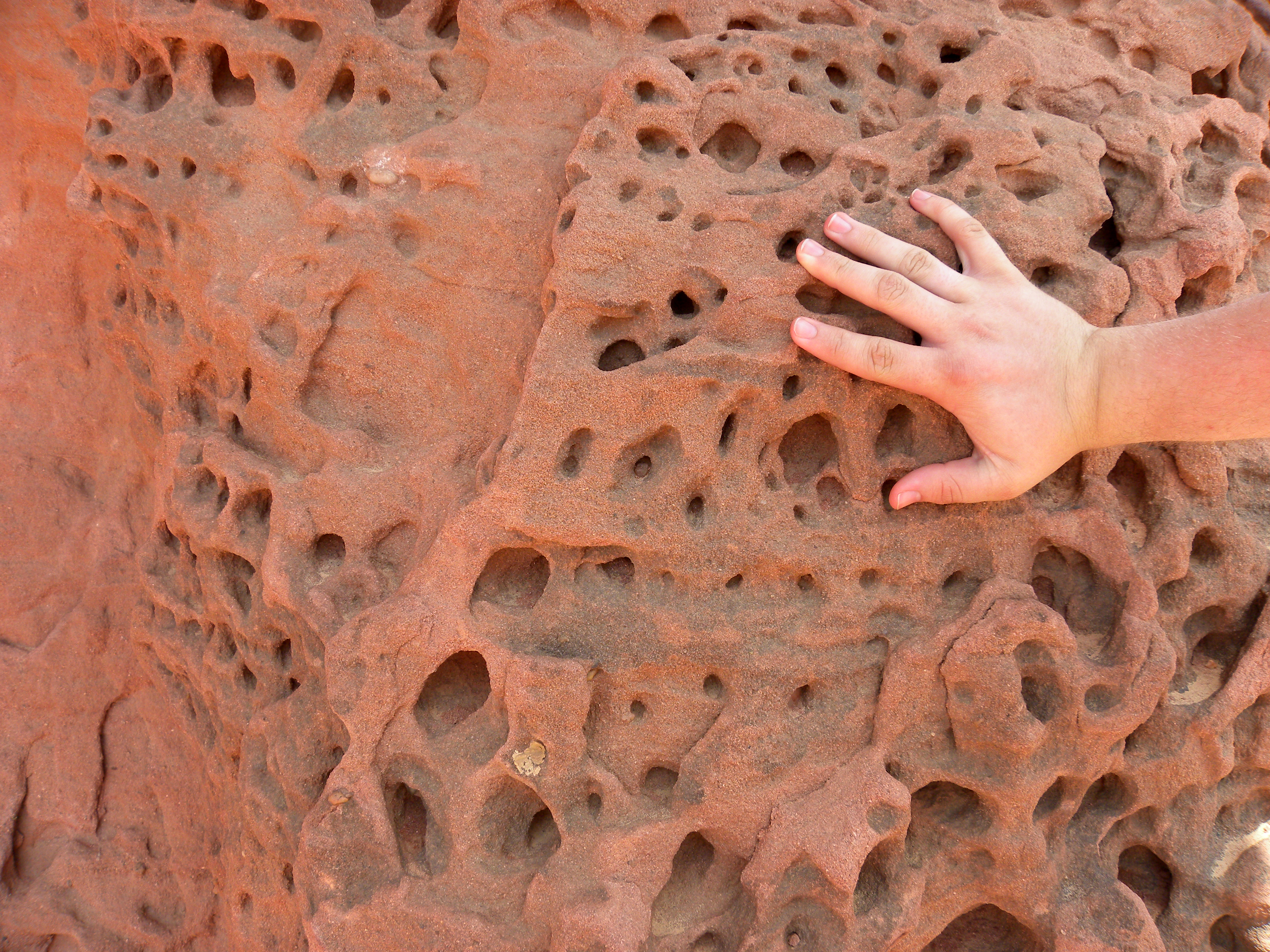
Tafoni in a Cambrian sandstone, Timna Valley, Negev Desert, Israel.

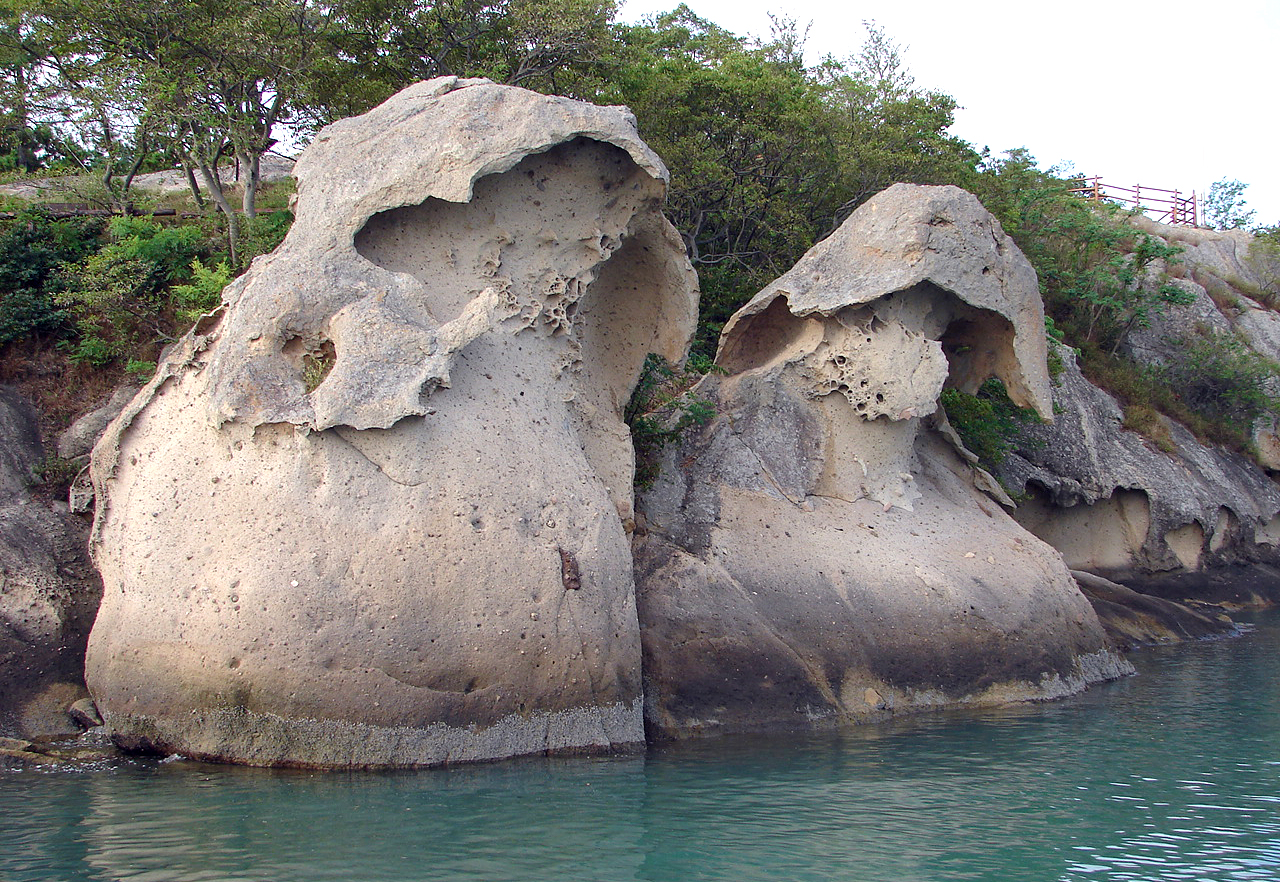
Tafoni formations, named Gatbawi (Hat Rock), found on the shore of Mokpo's east harbor, near the mouth of the Yeongsan River, South Jeolla Province, South Korea.

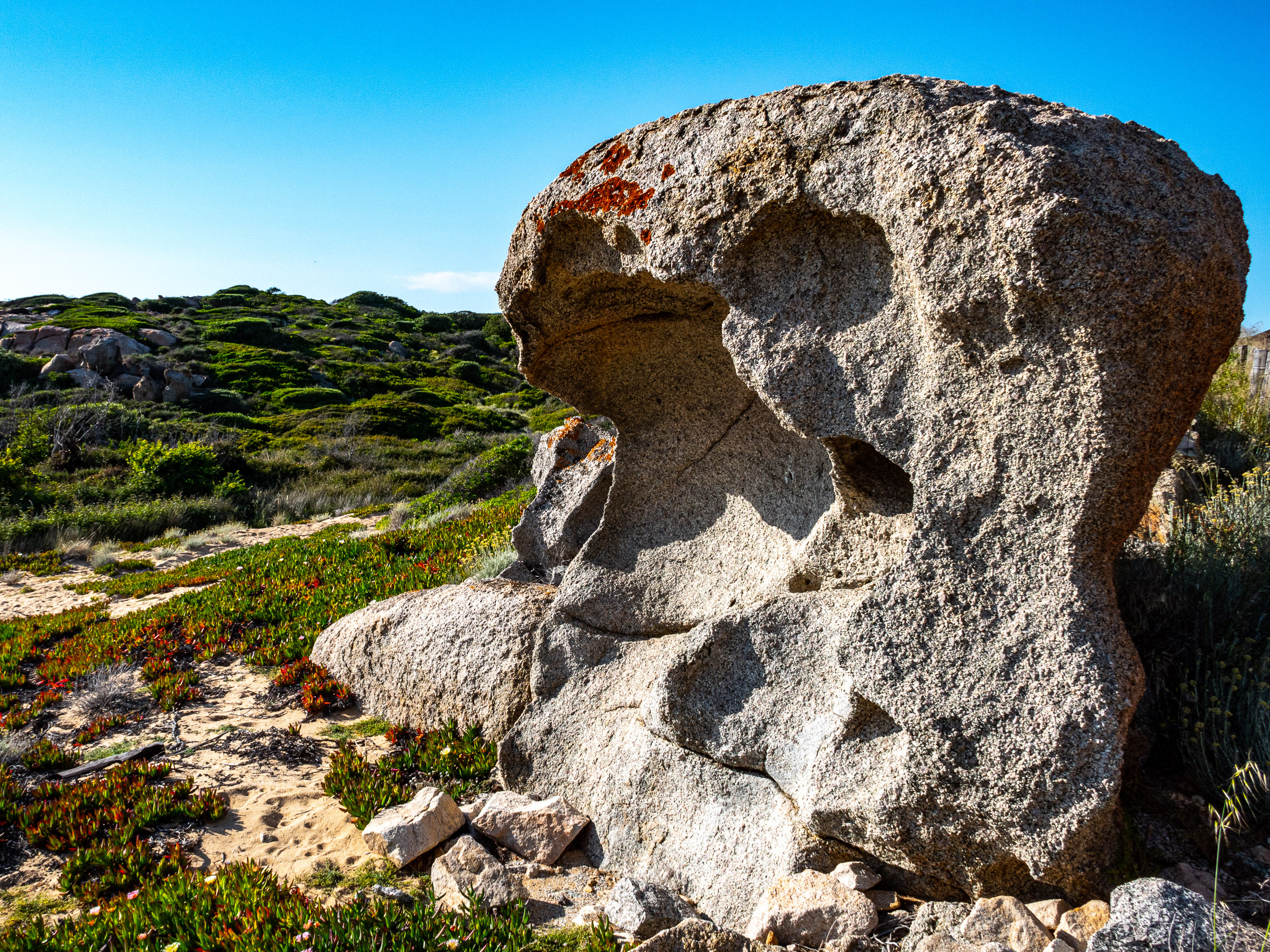
Tafoni on the shore of Corsica.

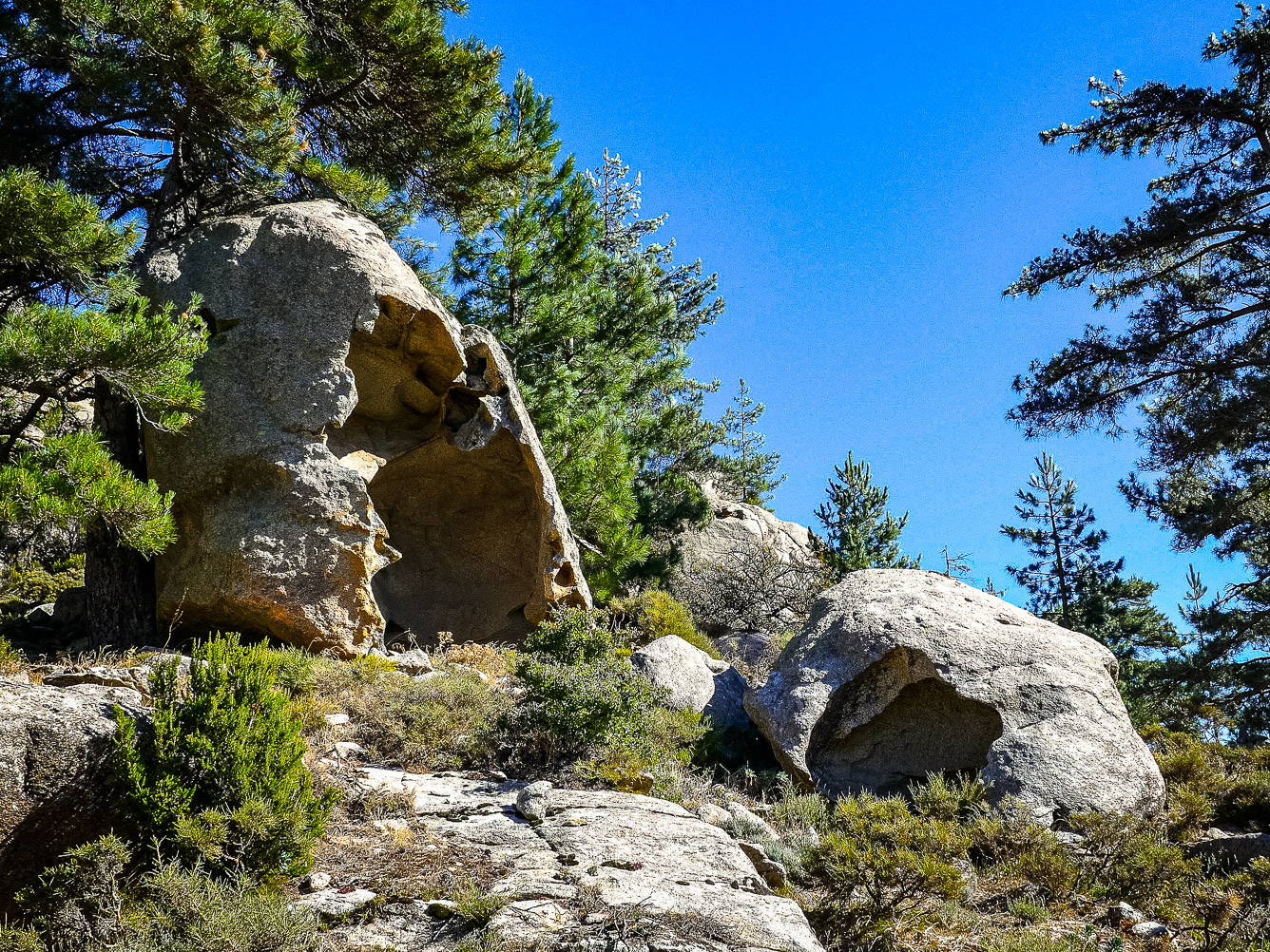
Tafoni in the mountains of Corsica.

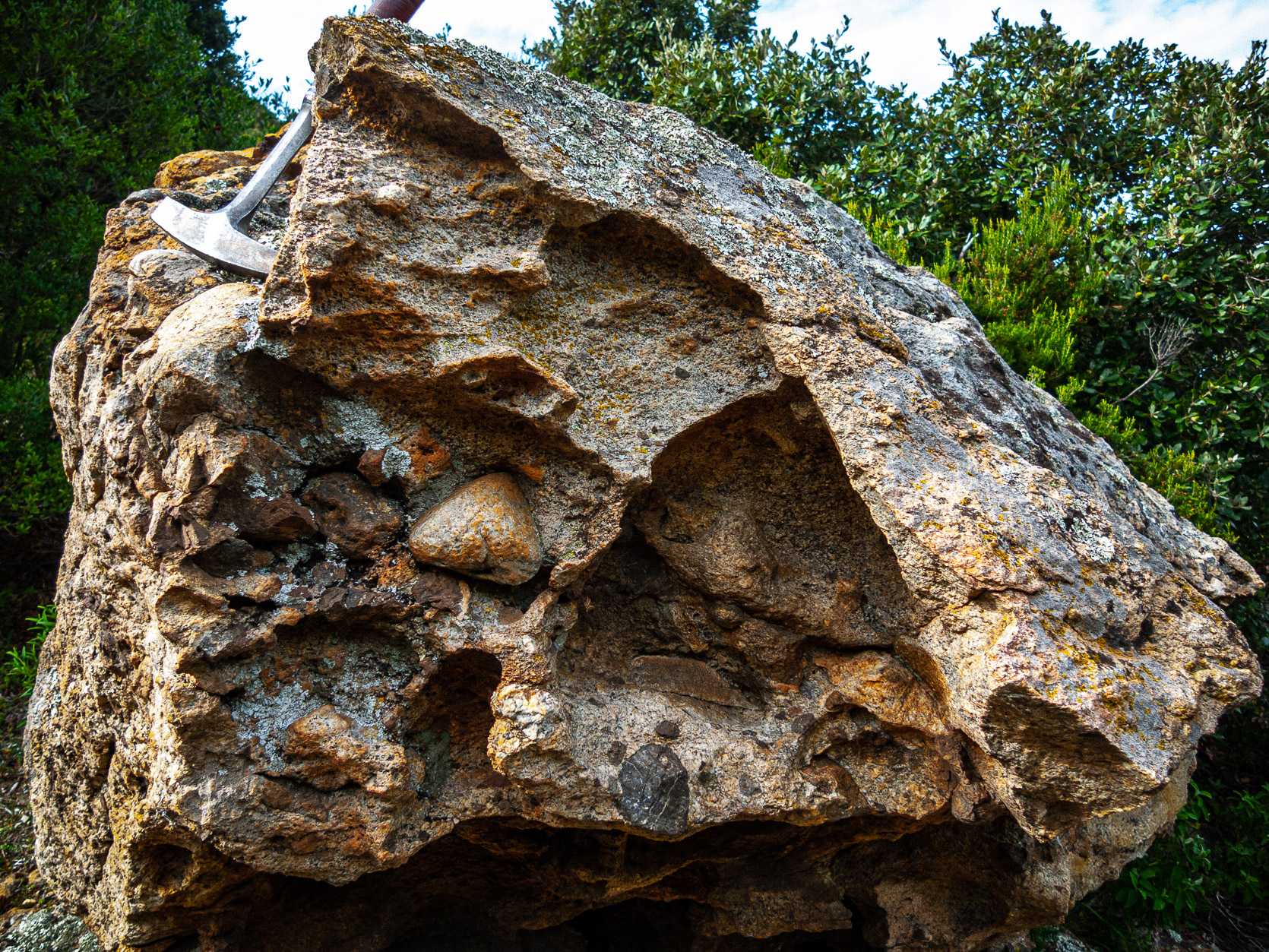
Tafoni in conglomerate rock, Corsica.

== See also ==
- Honeycomb weathering – Form of cavernous weathering and subcategory of tafoni, a similar weathering landform
- Weathering pits (or panholes) - rock basins formed on the top surfaces of non-glaciated rock outcrops.
- Haloclasty
