= Haloclasty =

Haloclasty (also called salt weathering) is a type of physical weathering caused by the growth and thermal expansion of salt crystals. The process starts when saline water seeps into deep cracks and evaporates, depositing salt crystals. When the rocks are then heated, the crystals will expand putting pressure on the surrounding rock which will over time splinter the stone into fragments.

Salt crystallization may also take place when solutions decompose rocks (for example, limestone, chalk, or sandstone) to form salt solutions of sodium sulfate, sodium carbonate, or calcium carbonate, from which water evaporates to form their respective salt crystals.

The salts which have proved most effective in disintegrating rocks are sodium sulfate, magnesium sulfate, and calcium chloride. Some of these salts can expand up to three times or more in volume.

It is normally associated with arid climates where strong heating causes strong evaporation and therefore salt crystallization. It is also common along coasts. An example of salt weathering can be seen in the honeycombed stones in sea walls.

== See also ==
- Tafoni – Small to large indentations in vertical to steeply sloping granular rock
- Honeycomb weathering – Form of cavernous weathering and subcategory of tafoni
