= Gatbawi (Mokpo) =

Rock formation in South Korea

Coordinates: 34.79193°N 126.425714°E

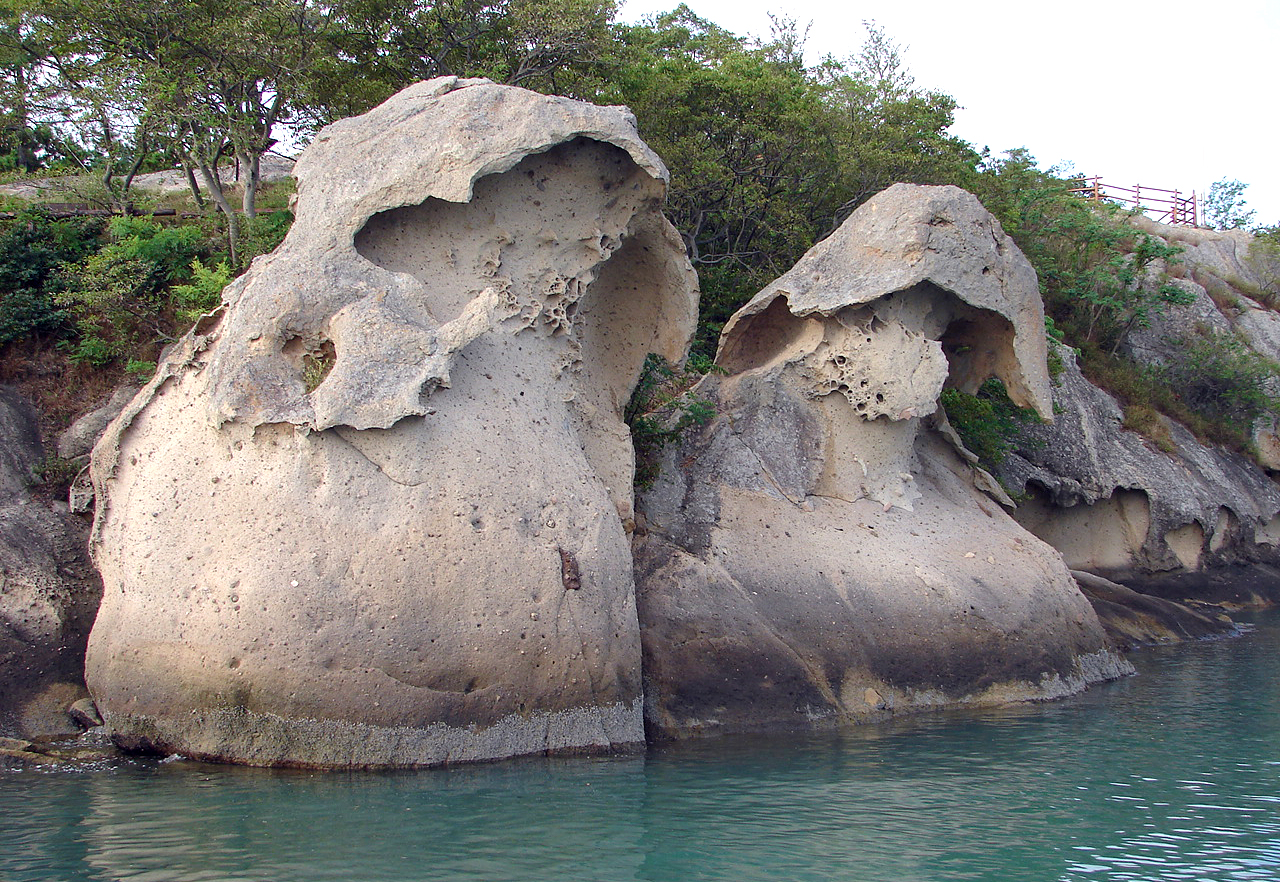
- Mokpo Gatbawi.

Korean name
- Hangul: 갓바위
- RR: Gatbawi
- MR: Katpawi

Gatbawi is a natural sandstone and tafoni formation found on the shore of Mokpo's east harbor, near the mouth of the Yeongsan River, South Jeolla Province, South Korea.

== Name ==
The name of this formation, Gatbawi (gat is a hat, bawi is a rock), means a rock shaped like a hat, specifically, a traditional Korean costume item worn like a hat resembling a Satgat, or a traditional Korean conical bamboo rain hat.

The two individual formations are named Jeongbawi and Satgatbawi, also the larger rock is called the "father" and the smaller one is called the "son".

== Geology ==
Gatbawi is a natural tafoni (small cave-like features found in granular rock such as sandstone, with rounded entrances and smooth concave walls) formation between 6 and 8 meters (20 and 26 ft) in size.

== Legends ==
There are two folk legends surrounding the origins of the rock formations that compose Gatbawi:

=== First Legend ===
"A long time ago, a young man lived with his sick father and sold salt. Though he was poor, he was a kind man who would do anything to help his sick father.

He worked as a farm hand for a rich house to save money to cure his father's illness. He did his job well but, in the end, his master didn't pay him. When he returned home after one month, he found his father’s body was already cold.

He regretted that he had been foolish in not caring for his father for a month. The least he could do was to try to make him comfortable in the afterlife. Unfortunately, as he was moving his father’s body, he slipped and dropped the coffin into the sea.

He felt awful about his father’s underwater burial. To make amends, he remained in that spot, wearing a bamboo hat until his death so that he too could not see the sky. Some time after his death, two rocks rose up at Gatbawi."

=== Second Legend ===
"Another story of the rocks tells that when Buddha and a disciple traveled across the Yeongsan River, they took a rest in this place. They continued on their journey leaving behind their hats. It is said that their hats became the rocks making them to be known as the monk rocks."

== Natural Monument ==
Gatbawi is one of the "8 famous spots of Mokpo" and was designated Natural Monument Number 500 in April 2009.

== Bohaenggyo Bridge ==
Boyaenggyo Bridge is a pedestrian bridge that leads out over the sea surrounding Gatbawi. Prior to the bridge being built in 2008, Gatbawi was only accessible by ferry. Since the addition of the bridge, visitors can visit Gatbawi on foot.

== Gallery ==
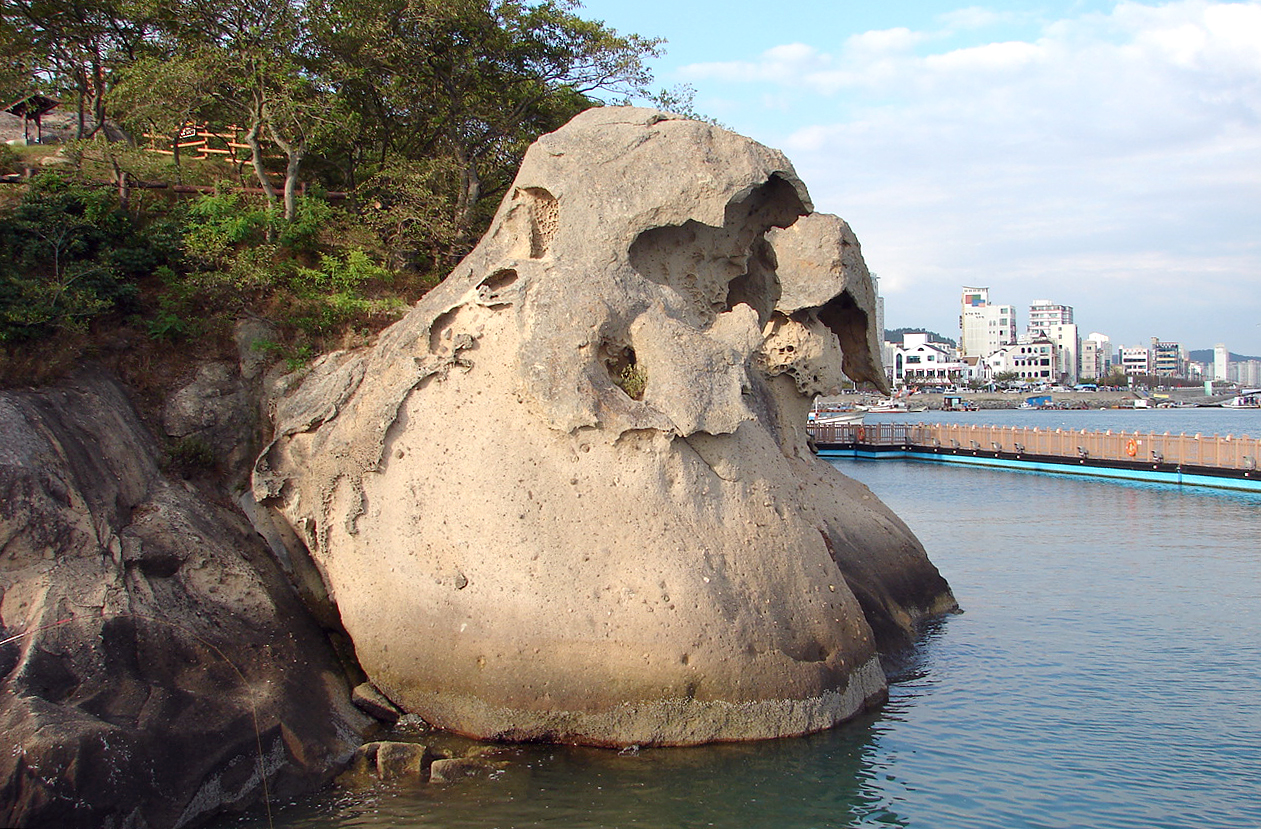
Mokpo Gatbawi

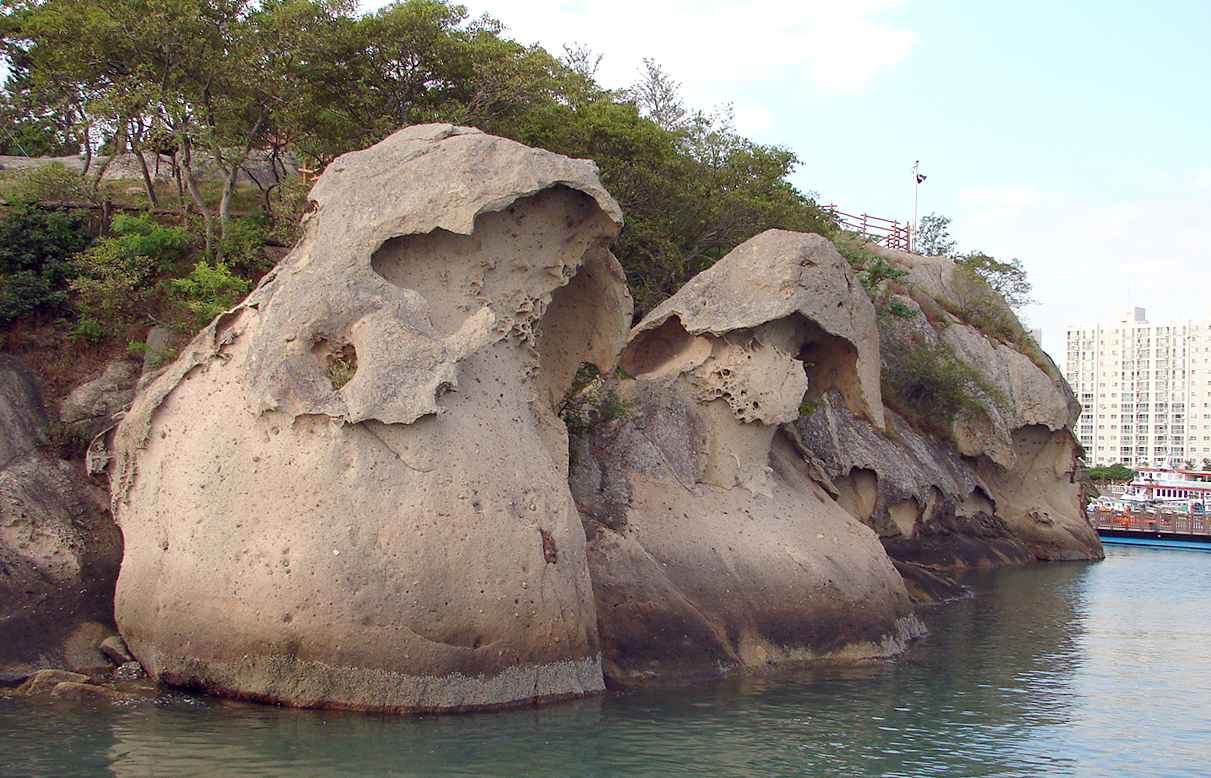
Mokpo Gatbawi

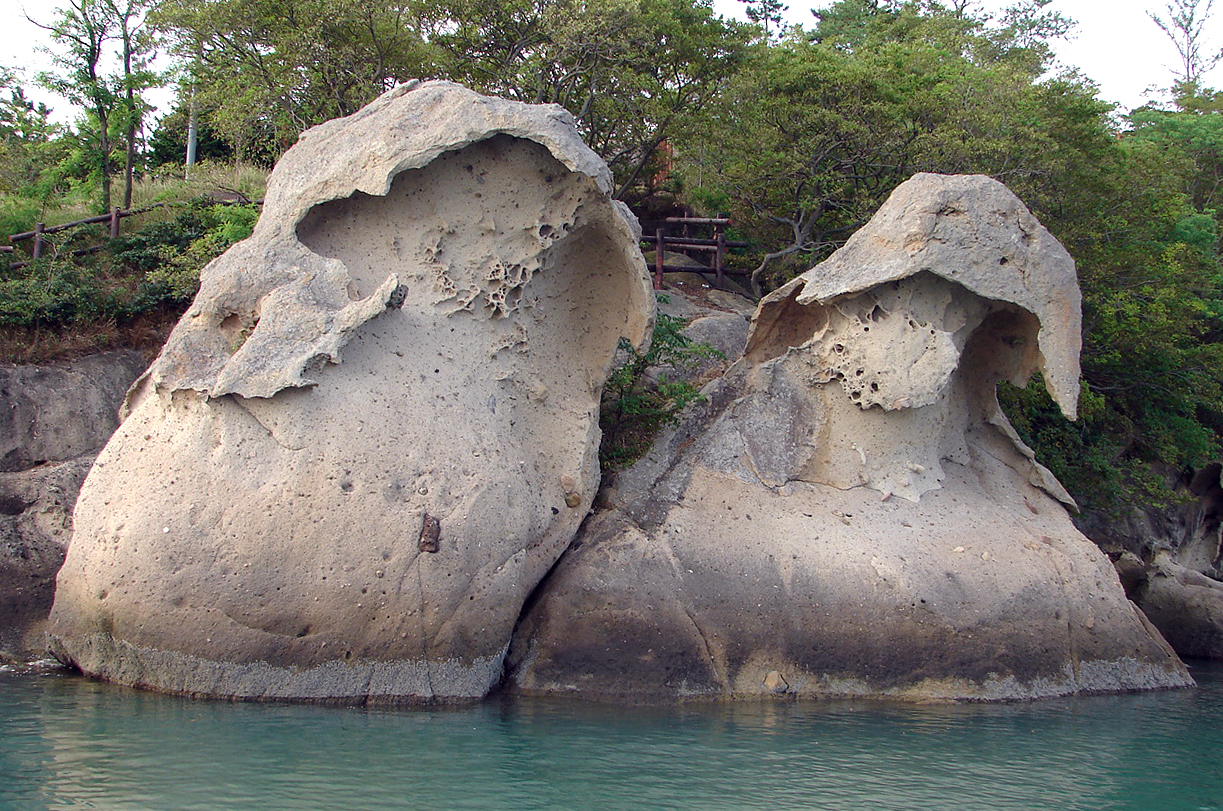
Mokpo Gatbawi

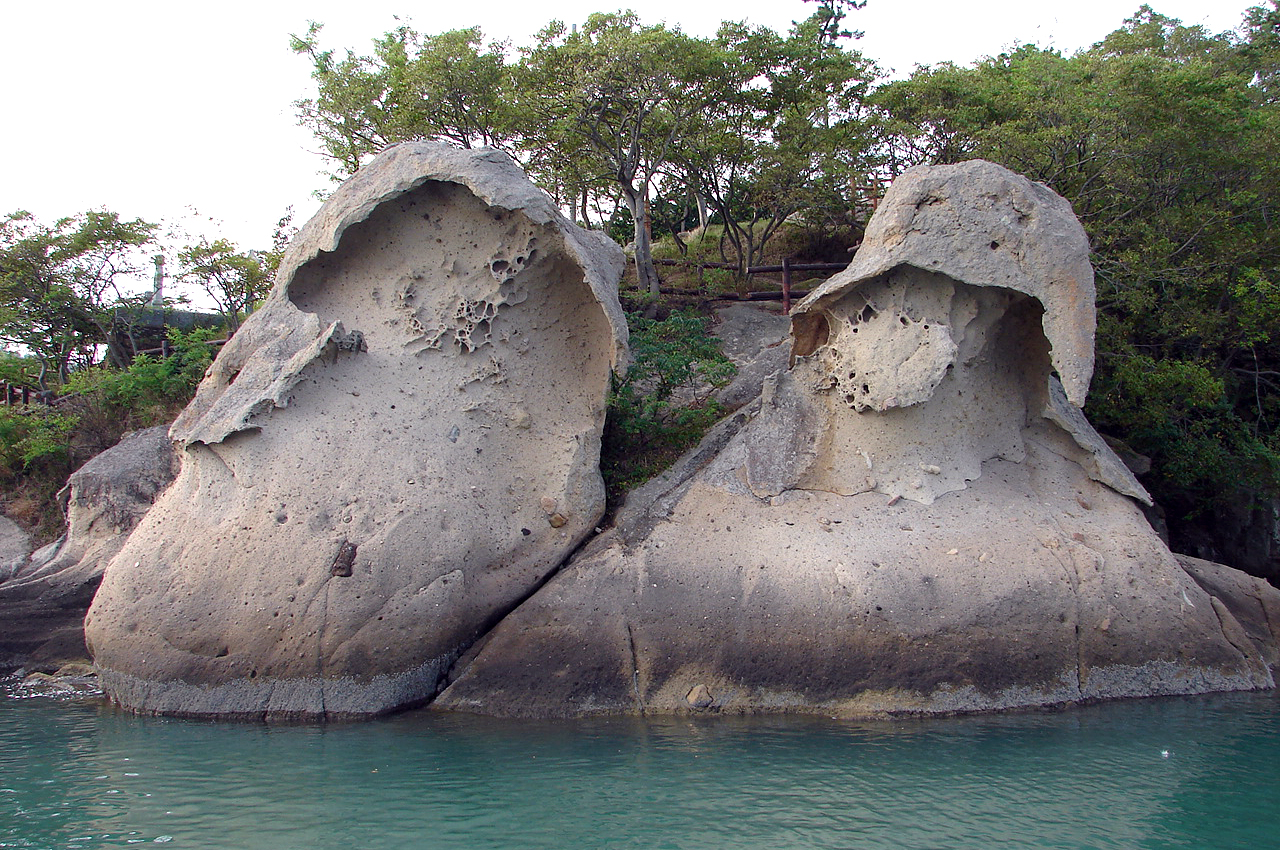
Mokpo Gatbawi

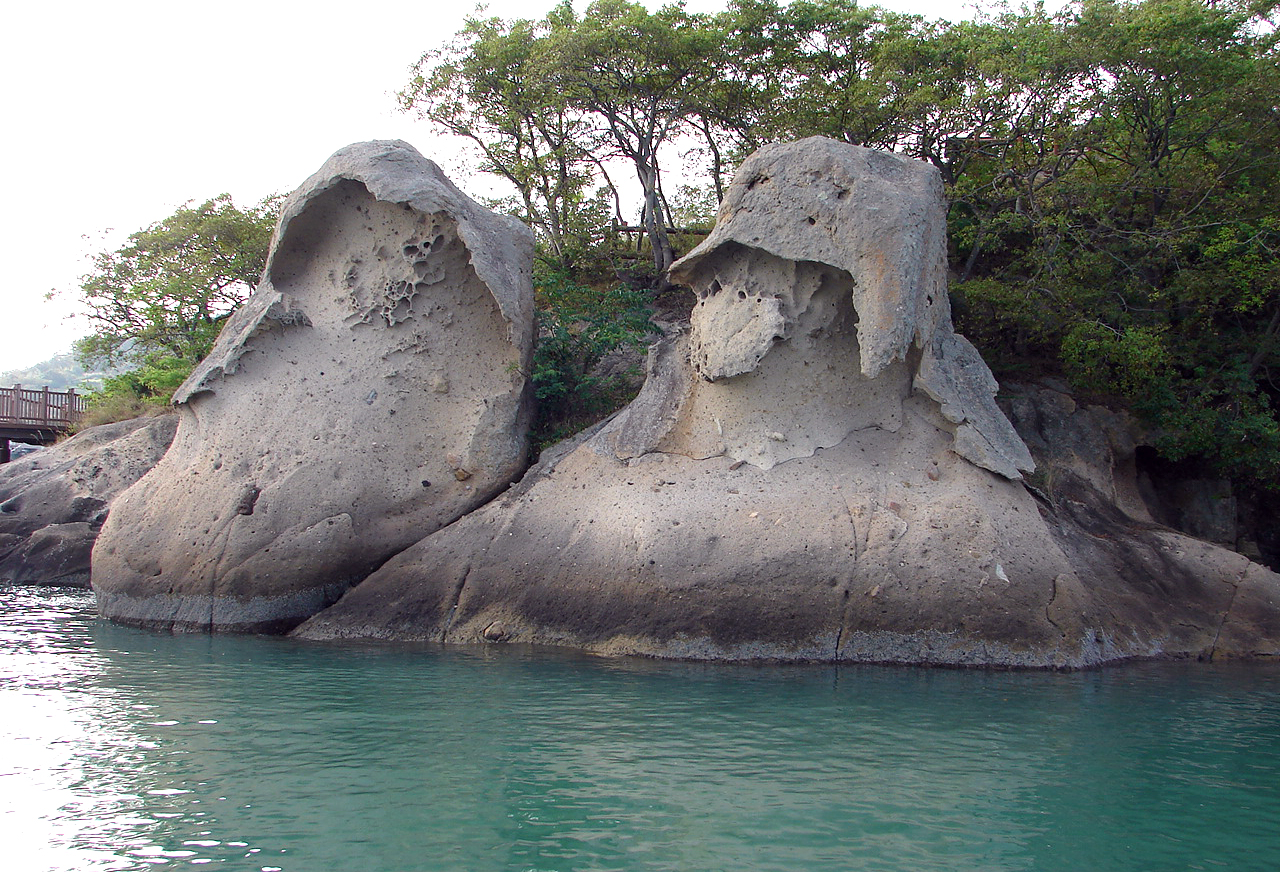
Mokpo Gatbawi

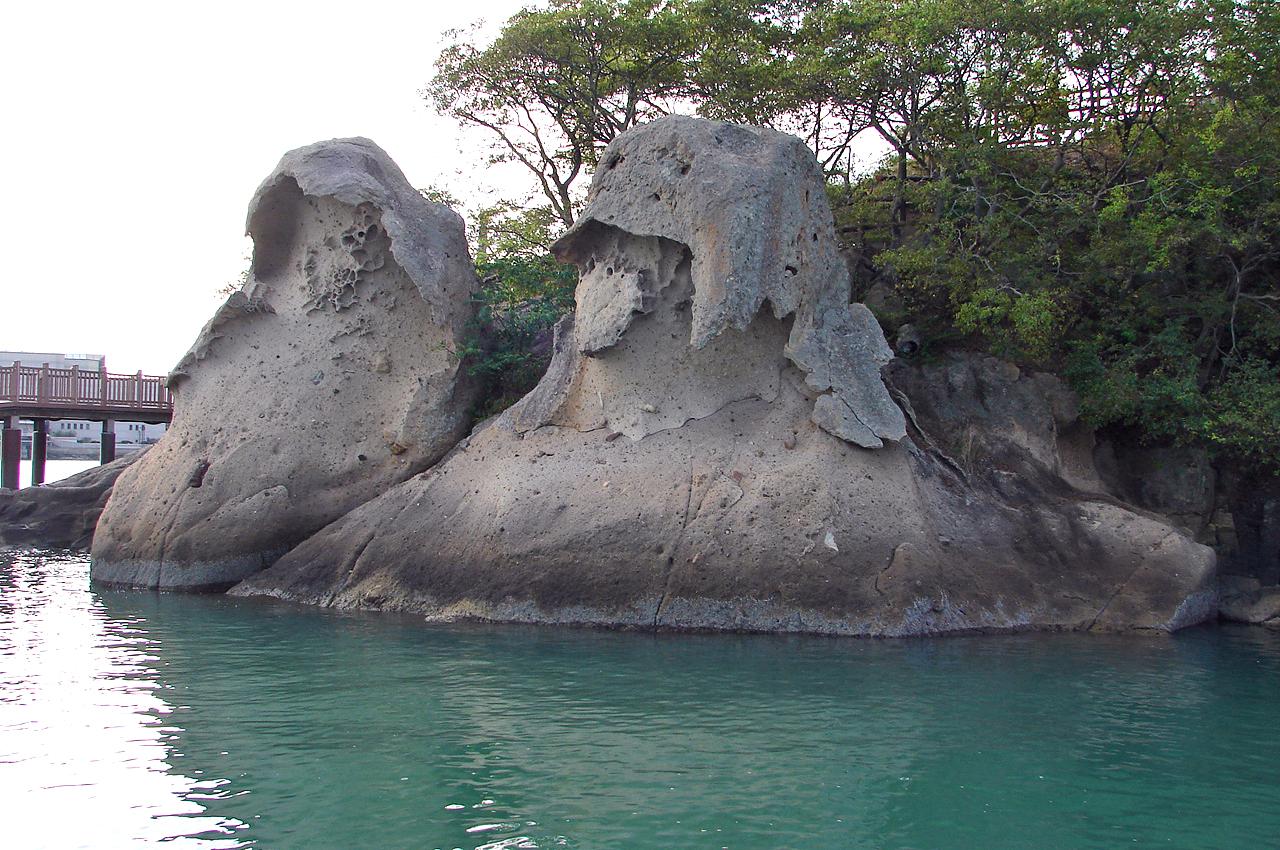
Mokpo Gatbawi

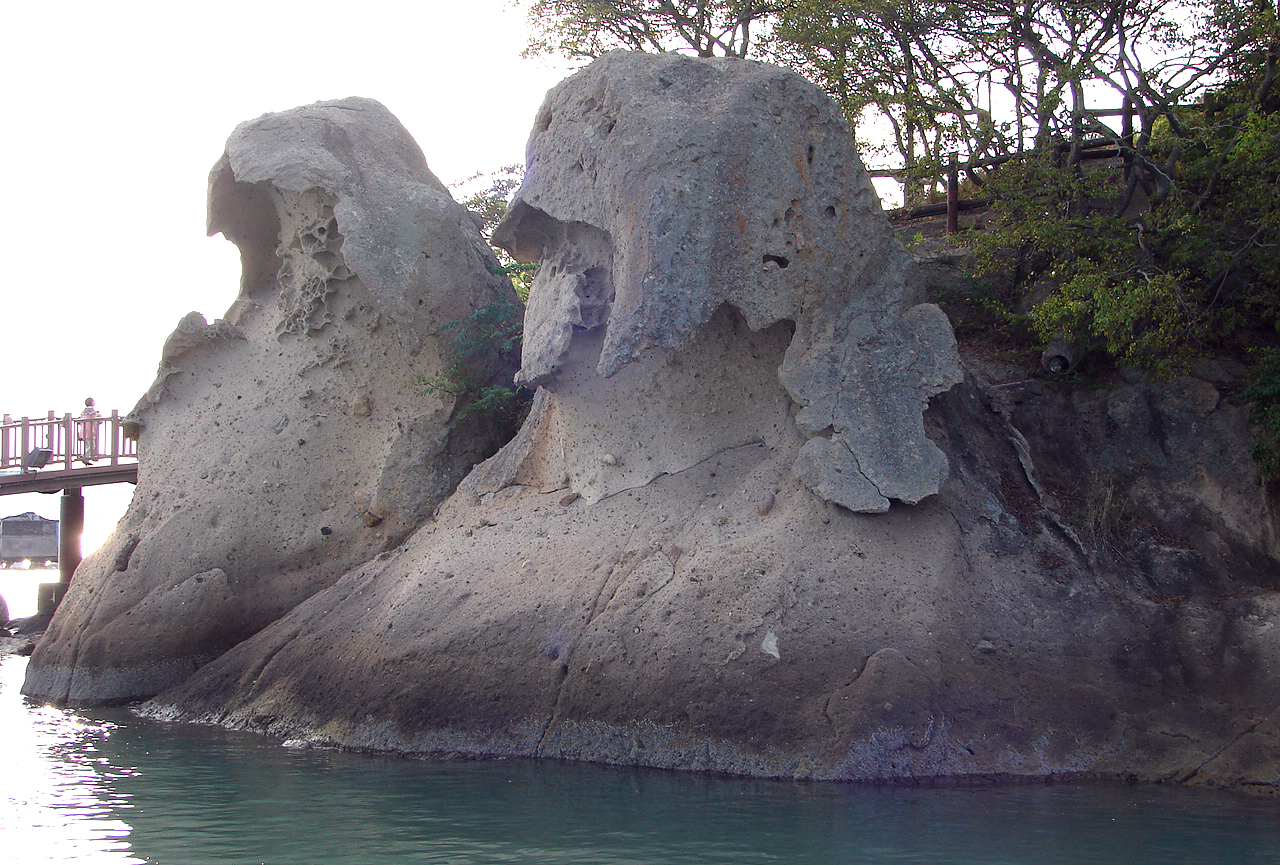
Mokpo Gatbawi

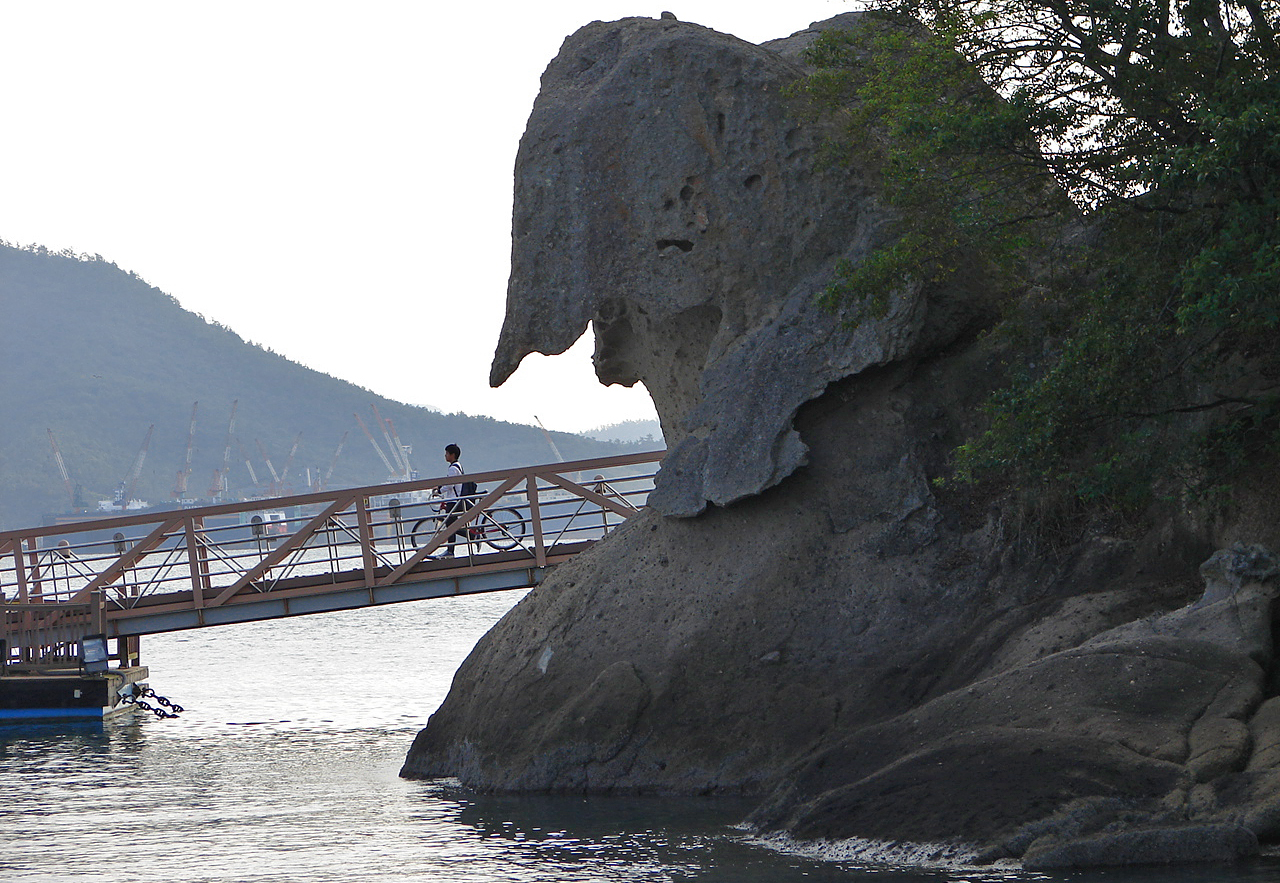
Mokpo Gatbawi

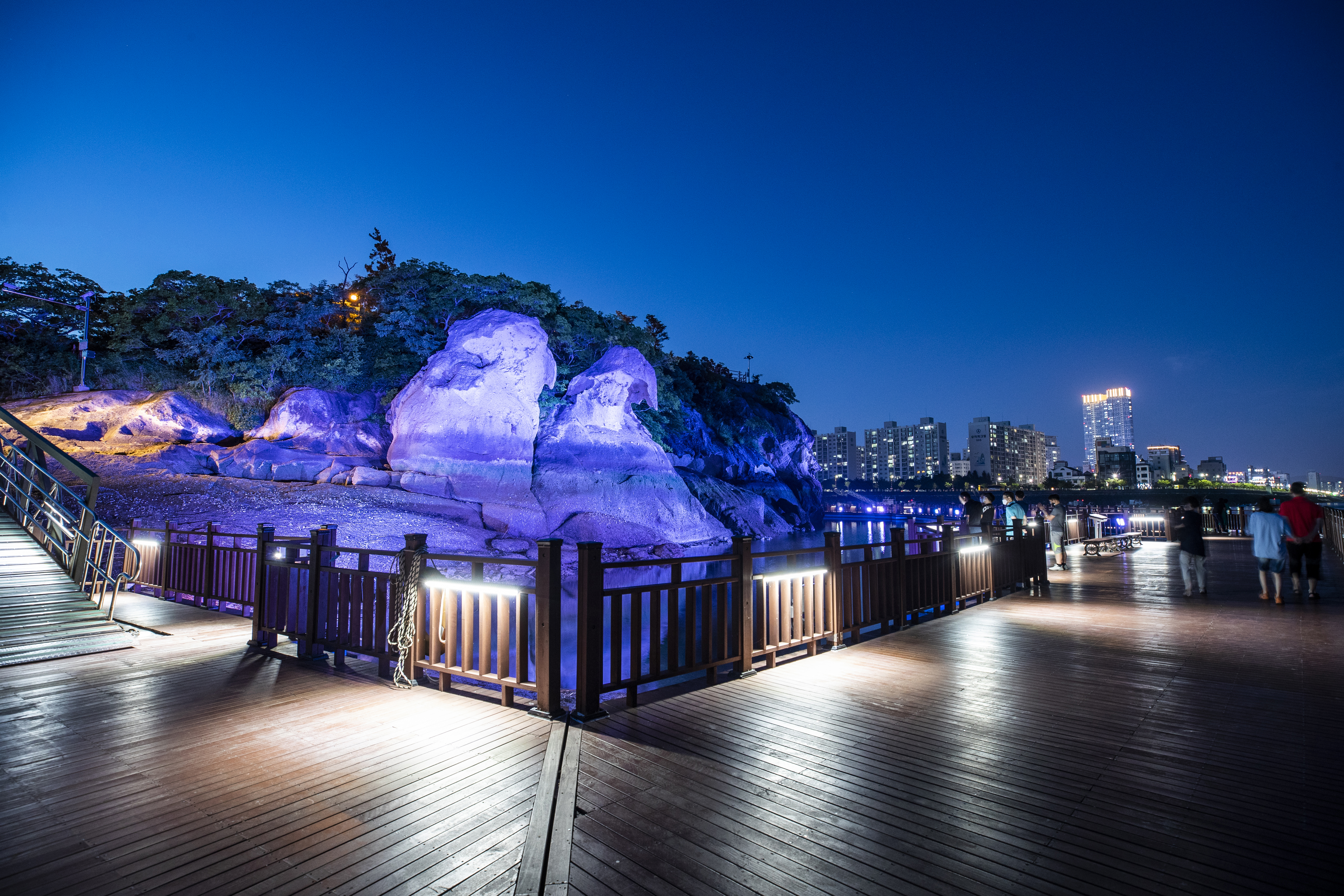

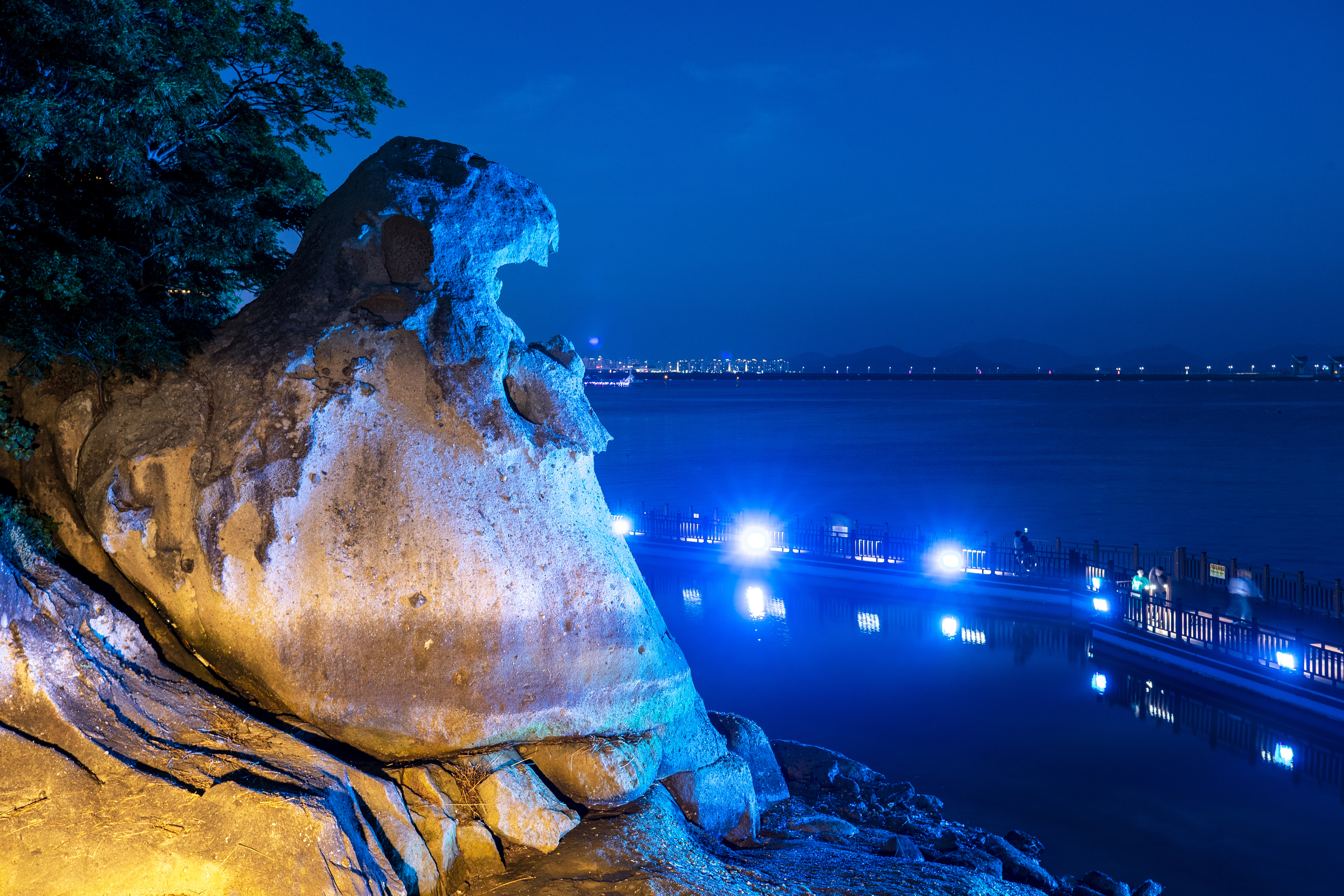

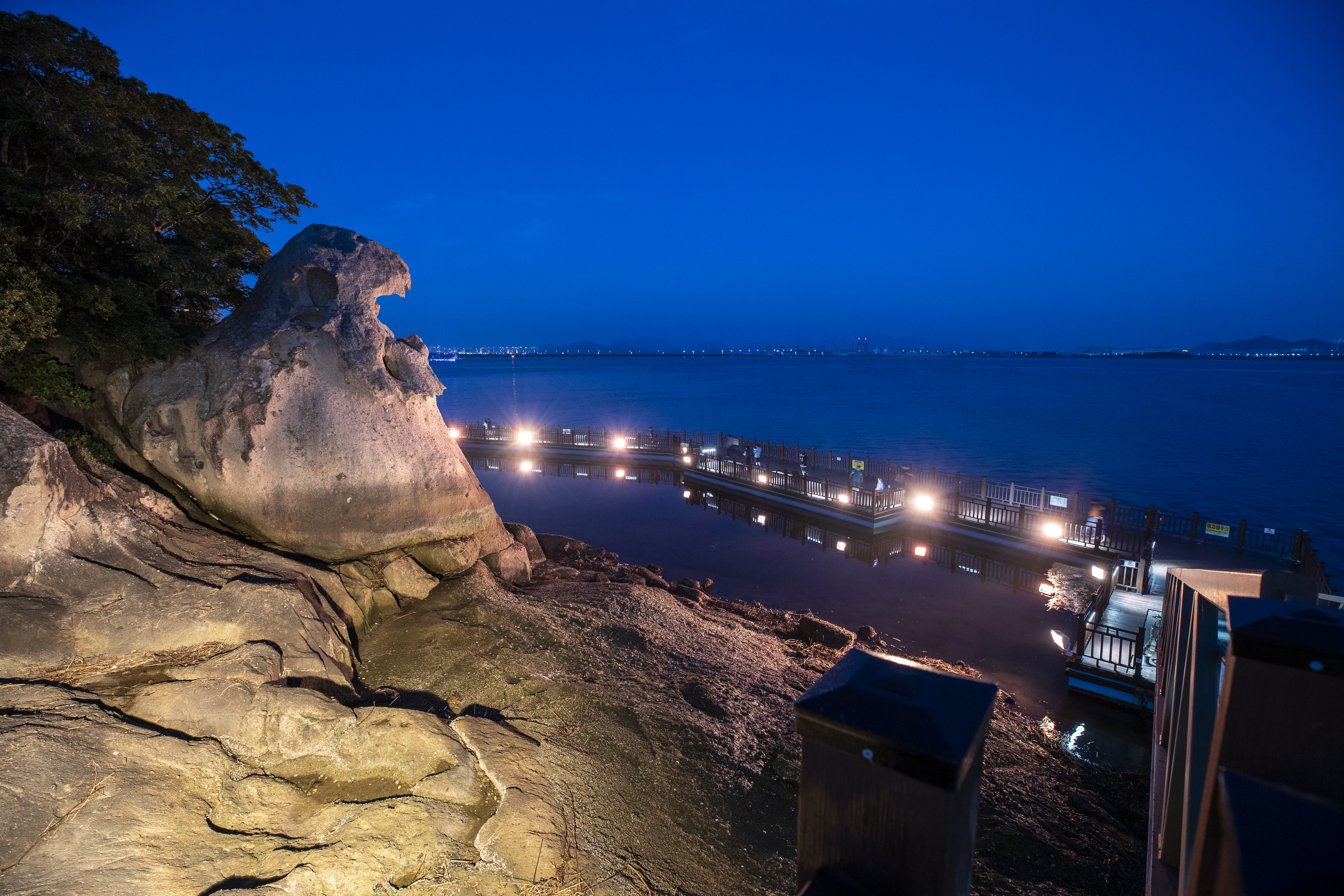

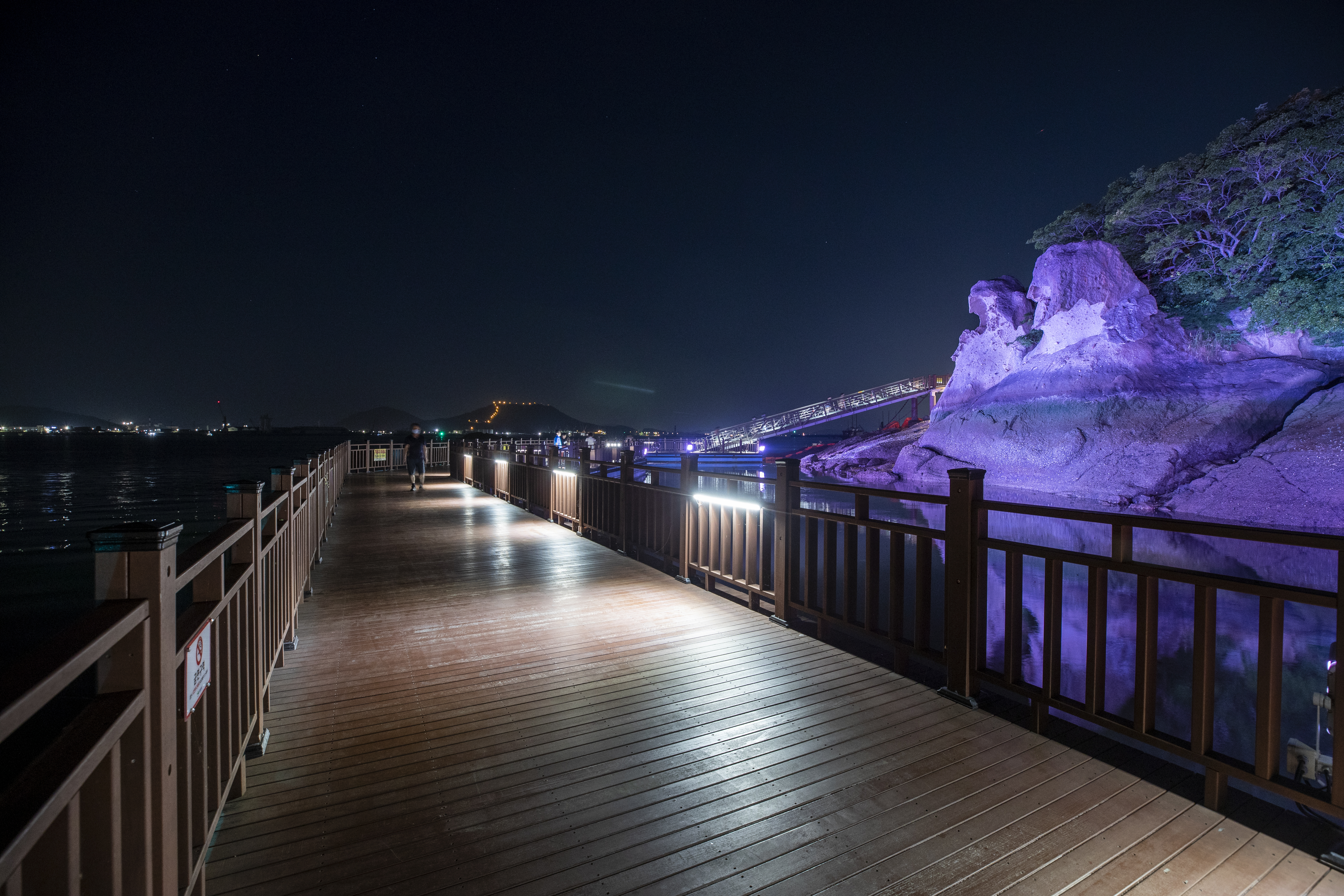

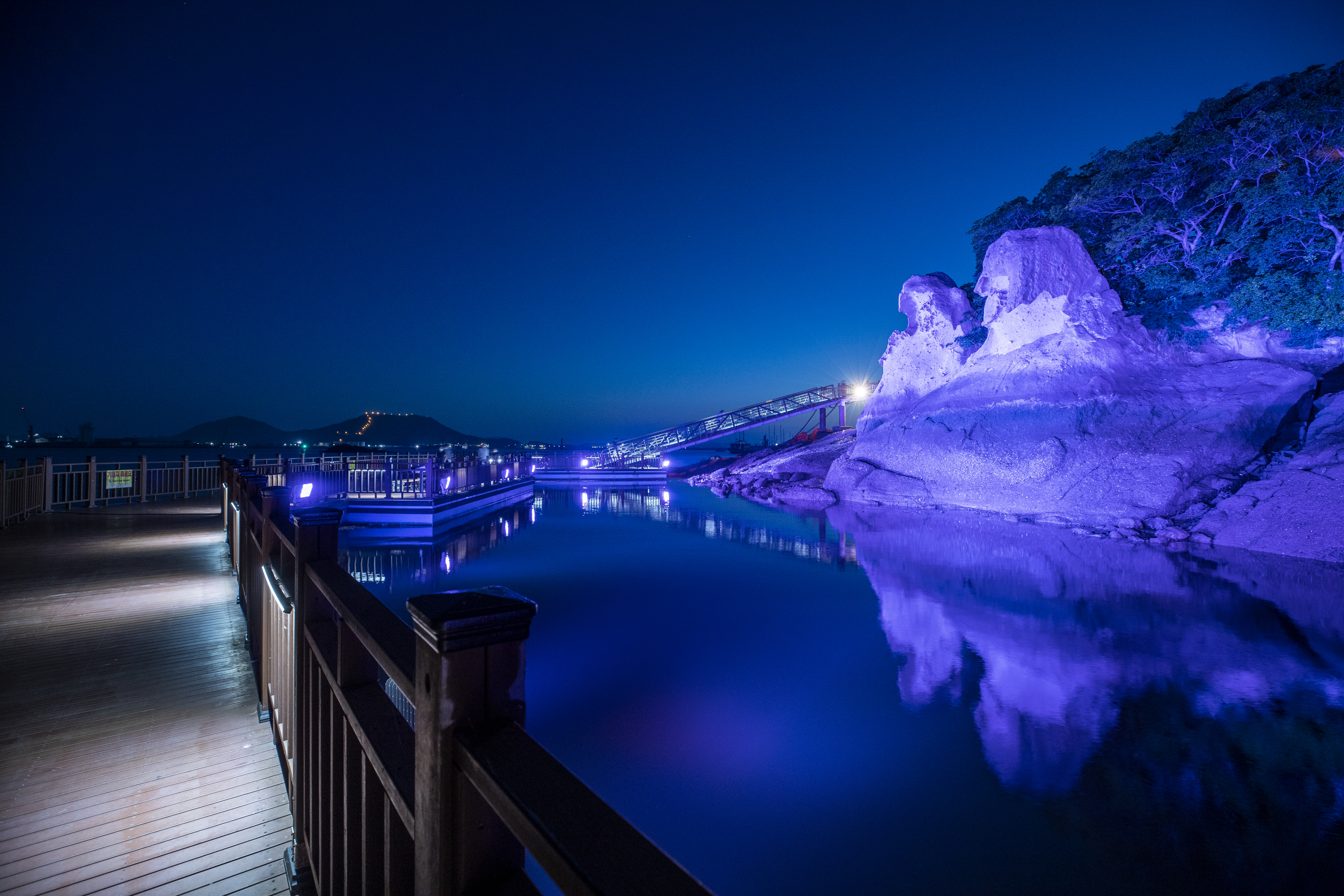
