= Honeycomb weathering =

Form of cavernous weathering and subcategory of tafoni

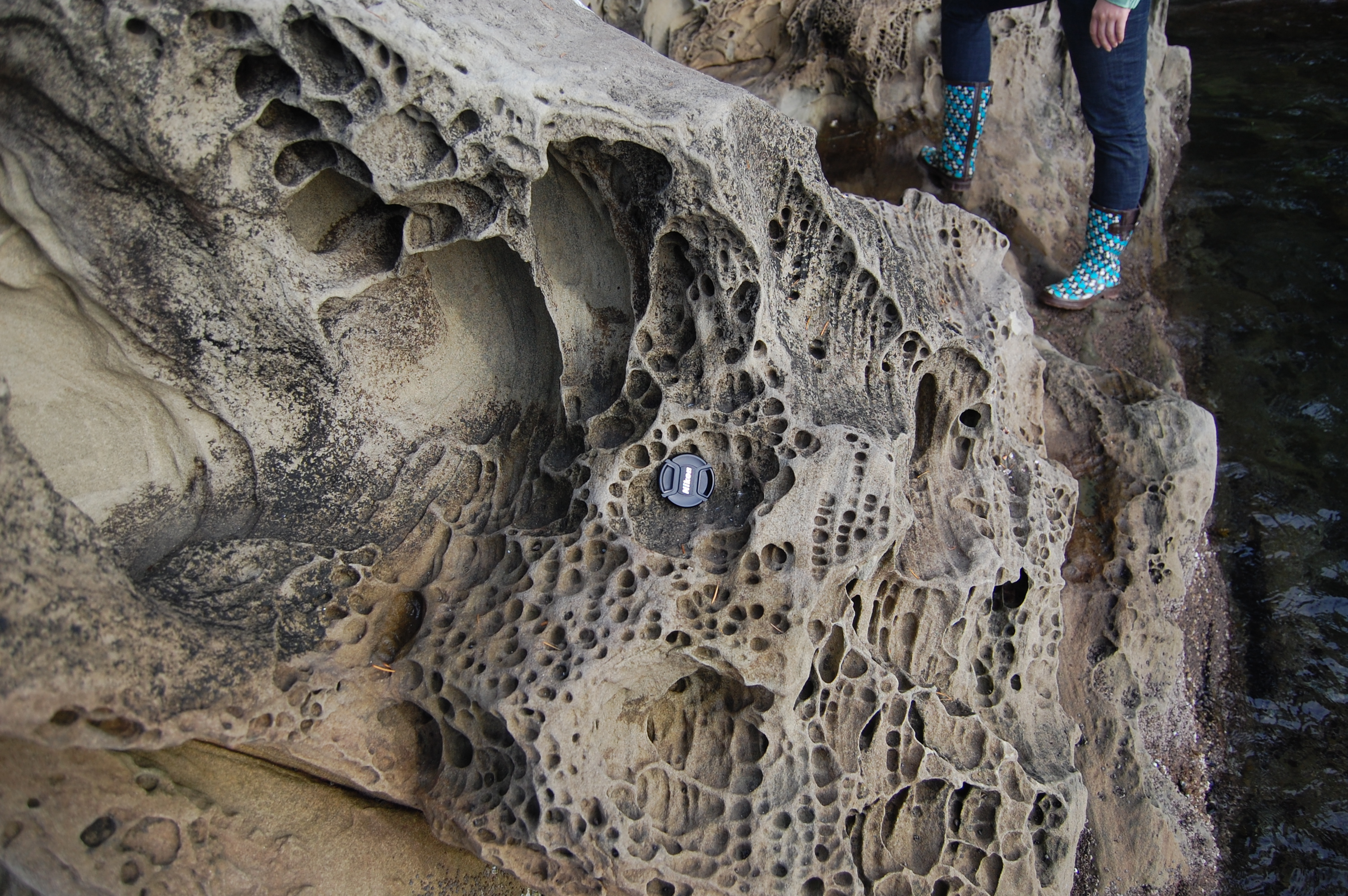
Honeycomb weathering in Larrabee State Park, Washington

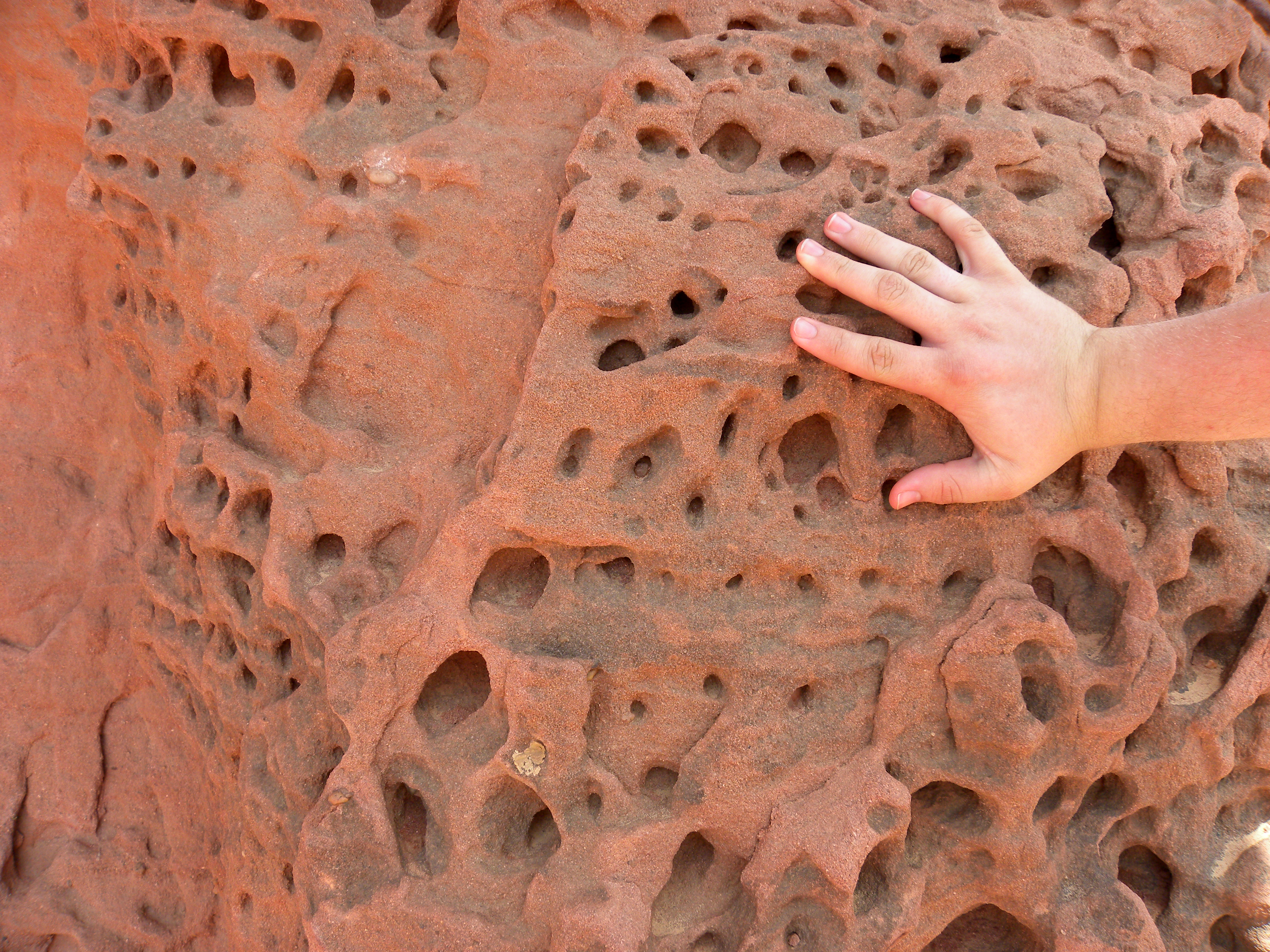
Honeycomb weathering in a Cambrian sandstone, Timna Valley, Negev Desert, Israel.

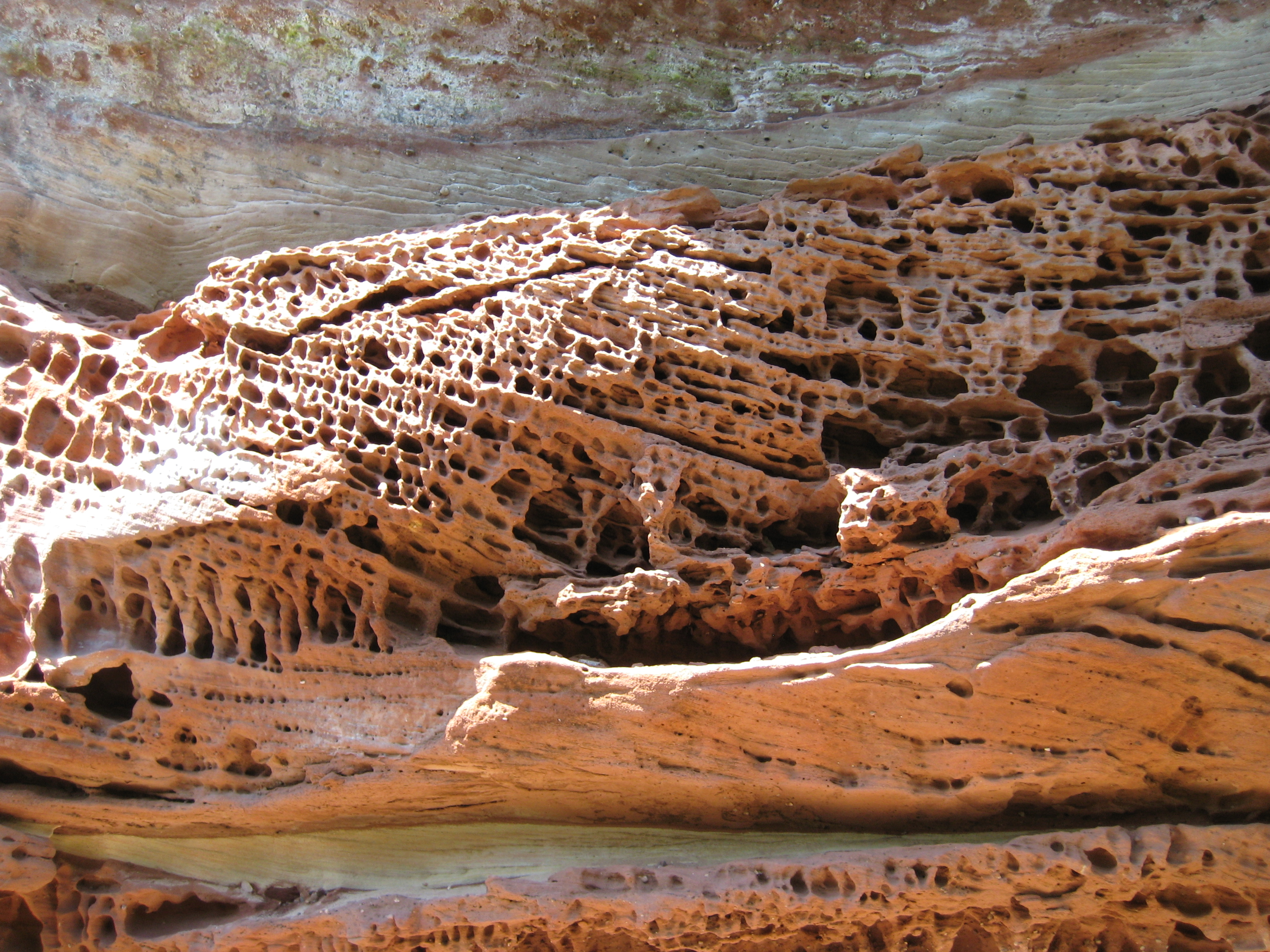
Honeycomb weathering at Altdahn Castle in the Palatinate Forest, Germany

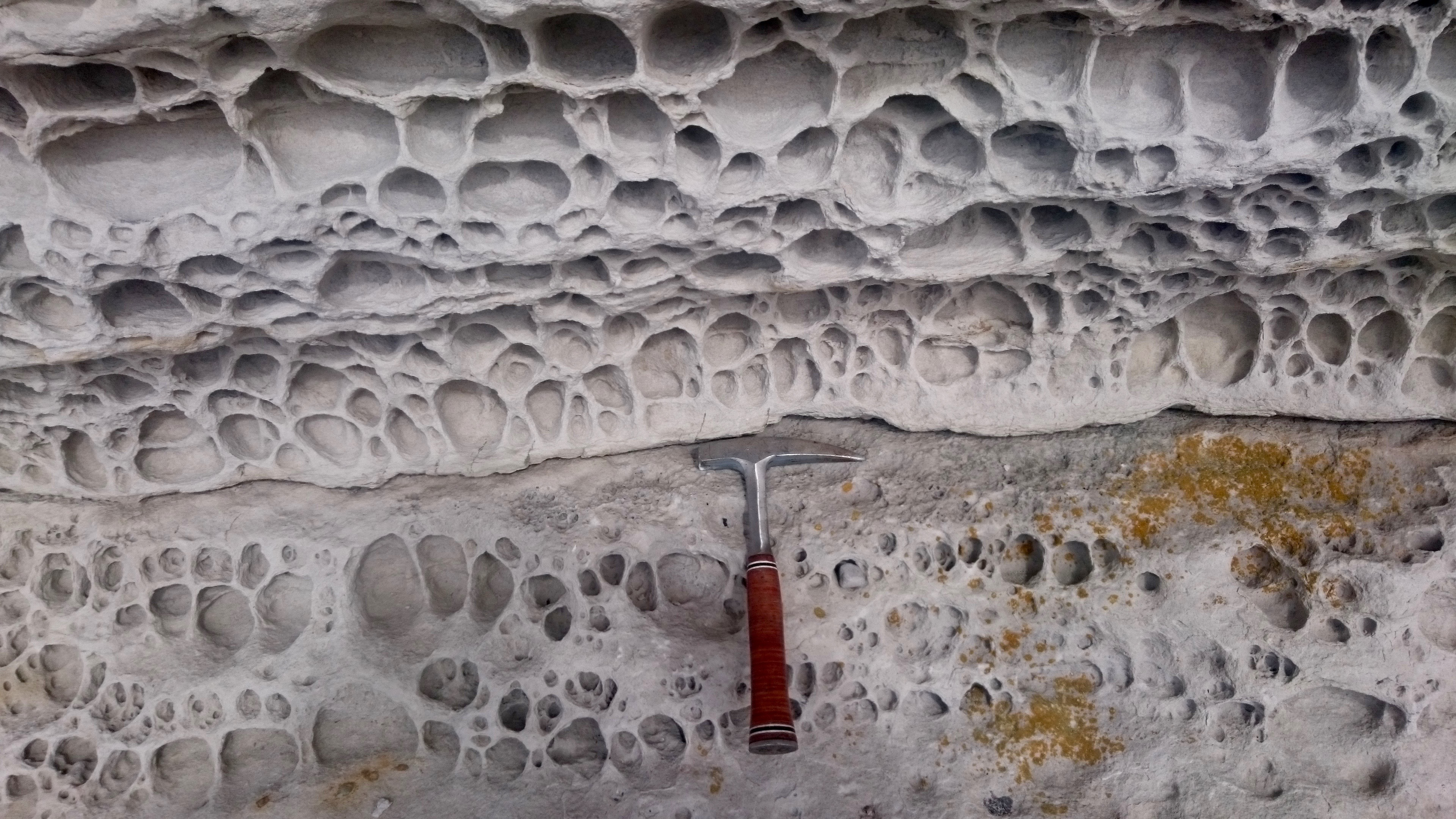
Honeycomb weathering of a cliff overhang, Elgol, Scotland.

Honeycomb weathering, also known as honeycombs, honeycombed sandstone, is a form of cavernous weathering that consists of regular, tightly adjoining, and commonly patterned cavities that are developed in weathered bedrock; are less than 2 cm (0.79 in) in size; and resemble a honeycombed structure. Honeycombs have also been called alveoli, lacework, stonelace, fretting, or miniature tafoni weathering. The size at which honeycombs are differentiated from tafoni varies greatly in the scientific literature and lacks an official consensus.

== Distribution ==
Honeycomb weathering typically develops in siliceous, either coarse-grained sedimentary (sandstone) or coarsely crystalline plutonic (granite) rocks. It can be found in all climate types, but is most prolific in salt-rich environments, such as deserts and coastal zones. The common factors in the environments in which it is found are high salt concentrations and frequent or occasional desiccating conditions. Honeycomb weathering is rarely associated with highly soluble rock such as limestone or dolomite. Honeycombs also occur in stone structures, e.g. buildings and breakwaters, where a rate of development can be established. Honeycomb weathering has been found to have formed in greywacke blocks since they were used to build seawalls on the coast of Southeast Australia in 1943 and 1949.

Honeycomb and other forms of cavernous weathering are likely as characteristic of the weathering of sandstones as fluting is of limestones, but it is not uniformly or universally developed. For example, in some cliffs, large expanses of the rock face exhibit surface weathering and cavernous weathering of metric dimensions. However, other rock faces are pitted between closely spaced bedding and vertical joint planes. In the southwestern United States, sheer faces of Coconino and Supai Sandstones cropping out along the sides of the Grand Canyon are only sparsely honeycombed. Also, the tall spires of De Chelley Sandstone at Monument Valley in Utah are unmarked by such weathering. In contrast, the Aztec Sandstone of The Valley of Fire in Nevada exhibits delicate and widespread honeycomb and other cavernous weathering. The difference may lie in contrasting patterns of permeability and jointing and resulting variations in the flow of waters through these sandstone.

== Cause ==
Many explanations have been proposed for honeycomb and other cavernous weathering. These explanations include marine abrasion; wind corrasion; mechanical weathering resulting from short-term temperature variations; chemical weathering of the interior of the rock (core-softening) under a protective crust (case-hardening) followed by mechanical removal of the softened material; biogeochemical weathering by lichens; temperature variations acting on salt efflorescence in coastal regions; and salt weathering. Most commonly, researchers have advocated salt weathering as the primary explanation for the formation of honeycomb weathering. Currently, it is considered to be polygenetic in origin; being the result of complex interaction of physical and chemical weathering processes, which include salt weathering and cyclic wetting and drying. There are instances where honeycombing or pitting of sandstone is due simply to removal of easily soluble cements such as calcite or dolomite, e.g. Cretaceous sandstones in central Kansas.

== See also ==
- Tafoni, a similar phenomenon
