= Case hardening of rocks =

Rock surface weathering phenomenon

Case hardening is a weathering phenomenon of rock surface induration. It is observed commonly in: felsic alkaline rocks, such as nepheline syenite, phonolite and trachyte; pyroclastic rocks, as pyroclastic flow deposit, fine air-fall deposits and vent-filling pyroclastic deposits; sedimentary rocks, as sandstone and mudstone.

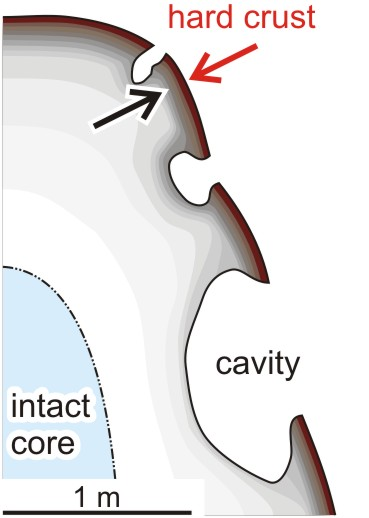
Principle of case hardening

== Weathering process ==
Chemical weathering alters the minerals constituent of rock surface. Decomposition of mafic and opaque minerals releases ions and colloids of iron, magnesium, calcium and sulphur. Alteration of feldspars and feldspathoids releases silica colloid. These materials are reached and transported by surface water. The remnant materials are highly aluminous and siliceous. They could have certain mechanical firmness of own minerals, however no cohesion. Therefore, physical disintegration of the rock takes place to form the surface.

In certain cases, the weathered surface obtains mechanical firmness higher than subsurface. The reached materials dissolved in the surface infiltrates in the weathered surface and cement the silica-aluminous remnant materials. The surface induration by means of this process is named case hardening. The physical weakness of the subsurface in comparison with the surface is called core softening as exemplified by the tonalite at Catavina, Baja California.

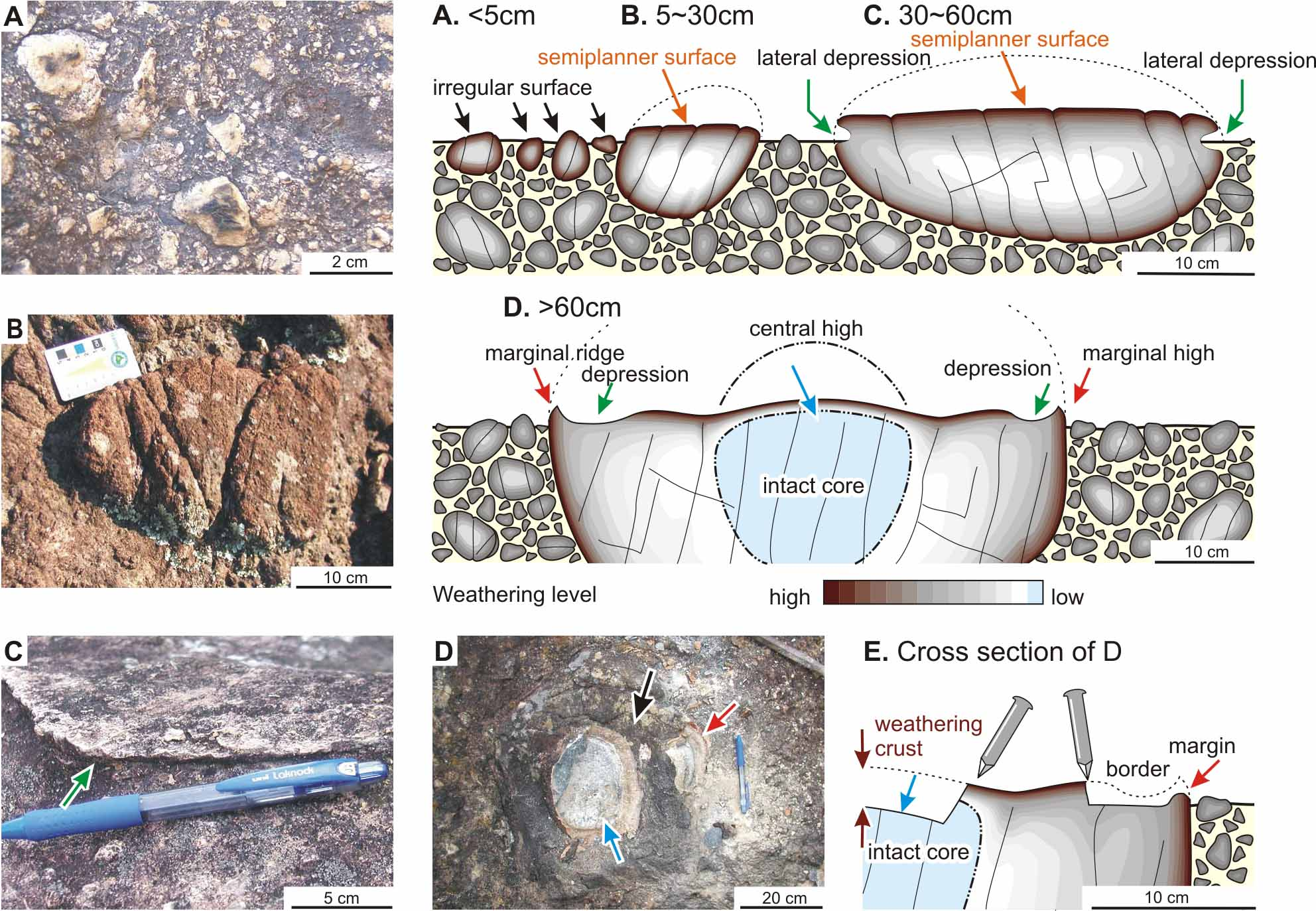
Case hardening on alkaline felsic rocks, Nova Iguaçu, State of Rio de Janeiro, Brazil

== Natural occurrence ==
Case hardening takes place in various types of rocks, being notable in porous ones, for example sandstone, quartzite and volcanic ash. The cement effect by silica observed in sandstone and quartzite is prominent. Sandstone from the Valley of Fire, Nevada, is usually cemented by calcite but the calcium borate mineral, colemanite, has also been found in some cases to act as a cement. A similar phenomenon is observed in felsic alkaline rocks, such as nepheline syenite, alkaline syenite, phonolite, and trachyte, because of weathering vulnerability of nepheline and alkaline feldspar. The case hardening on trachytic clasts of volcanic breccia shows peculiar fabrics.

The Mars scientific exploring machine Spirit has observed case hardening of the rock surface at Gusev meteorite Crater. This phenomenon is attributed to the weathering by means of surface water, being considered to be an evidence of liquid water in a far past on that planet.

== Mineral dissociation ==
On the rock surface in the case hardening of alkaline felsic rocks, the weathering selectively affects certain minerals. Nepheline is very sensitive to weathering and is altered to natrolita and cancrinite. On the outcropping surface of a nepheline syenite, phonolite or nepheline syenite gneiss, the minerals formed by nepheline alteration appear white in colour on the dark-coloured weathered background. After the nepheline alteration products are leached, small holes are formed on the rock.

A similar phenomenon takes place also in selective alteration of alkaline feldspar. This mineral is more resistant than nepheline. However, water infiltrates along cleavage planes and the weathering advances easily up to the mineral core. Because of this phenomenon, physical disintegration of alkaline feldspar takes place. The selective elimination of nepheline and alkaline feldspar is named mineral dissociation. When this phenomenon is highly advanced, the altered rock surface show the fabric similar to vesicular texture, called pseudovesicular structure.

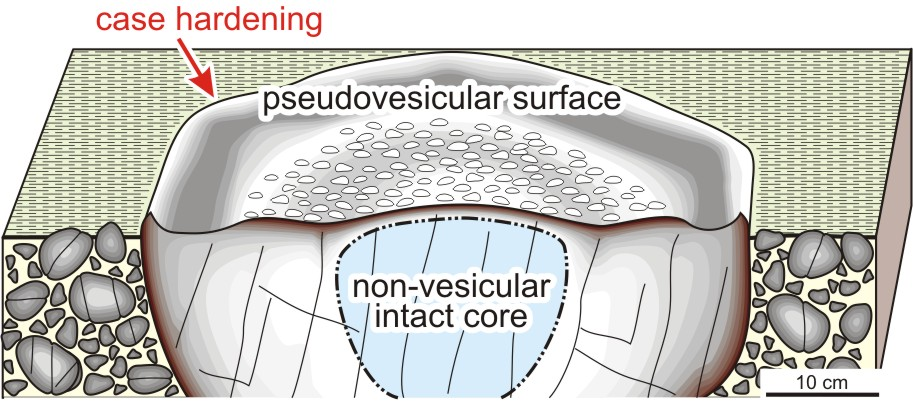
Pseudovesicular structure on alkaline felsic rocks, Nova Iguaçu, State of Rio de Janeiro, Brazil, after Motoki et al. (2007)
