= Daegu =

City in South Korea

- Metropolitan city
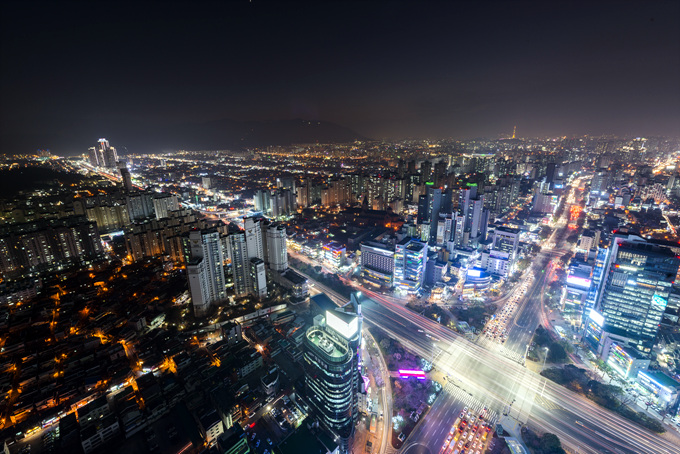
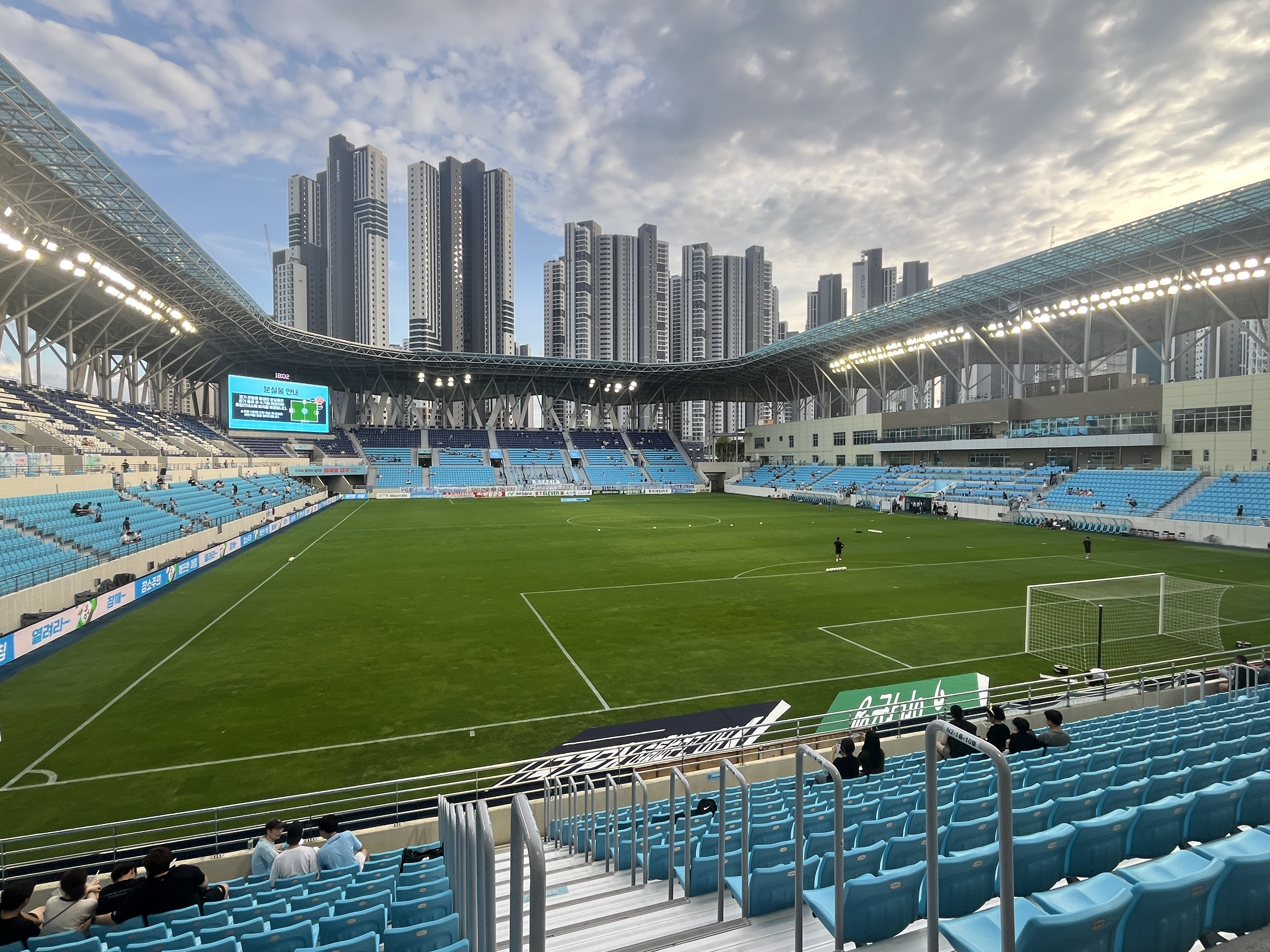
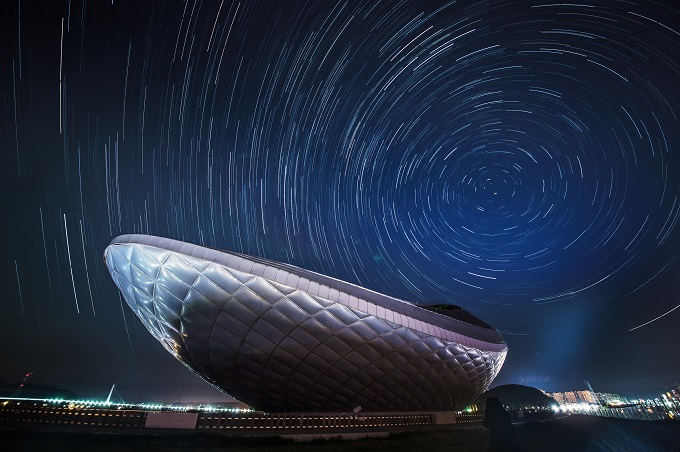
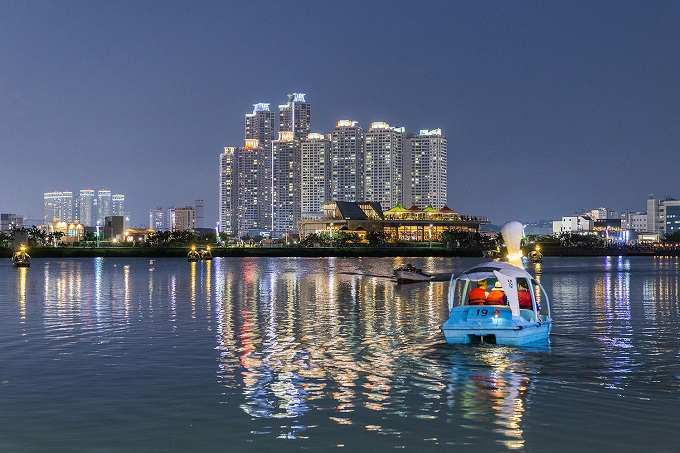
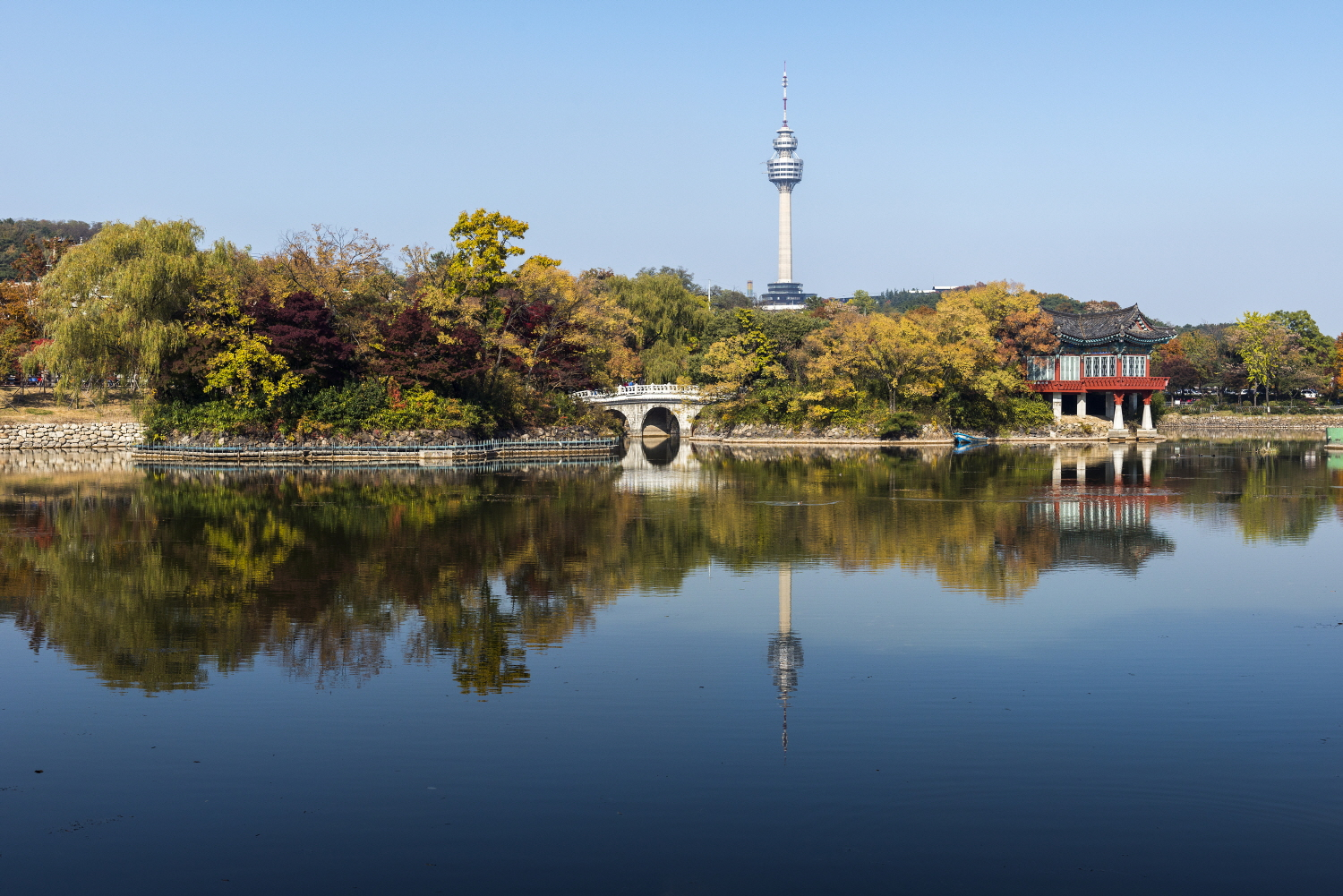
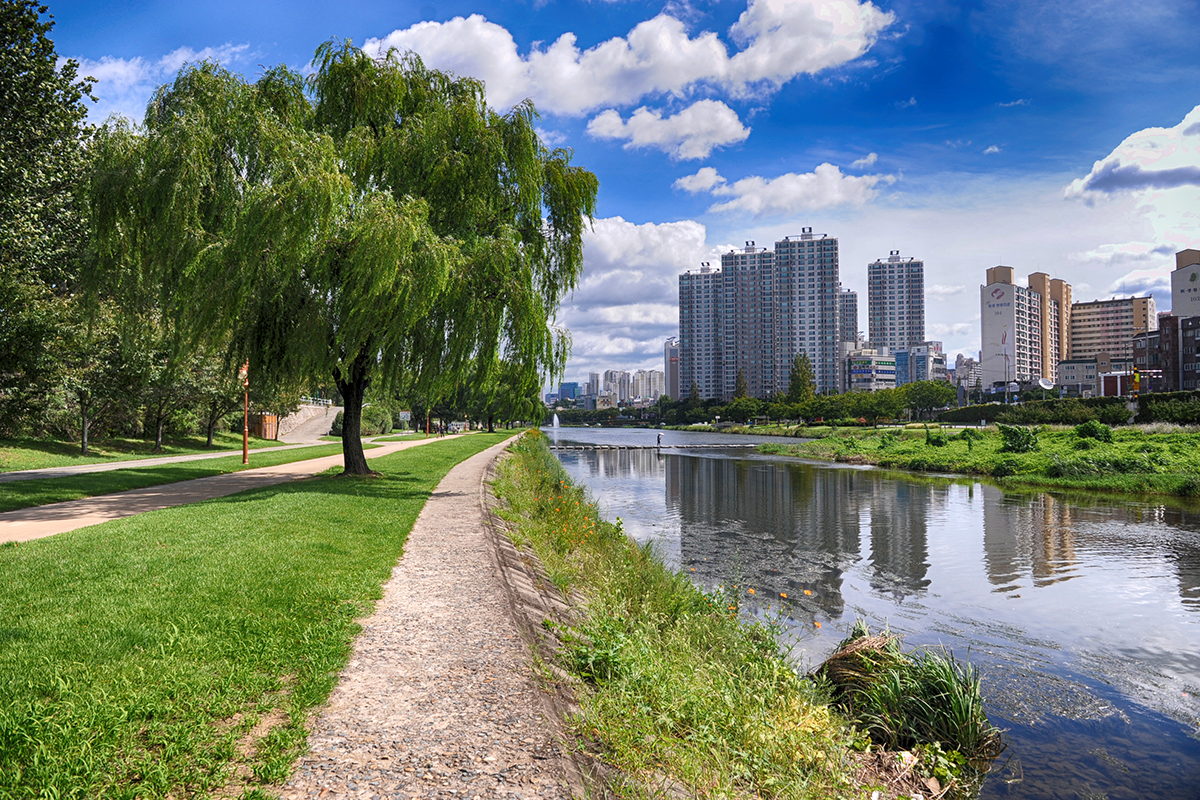
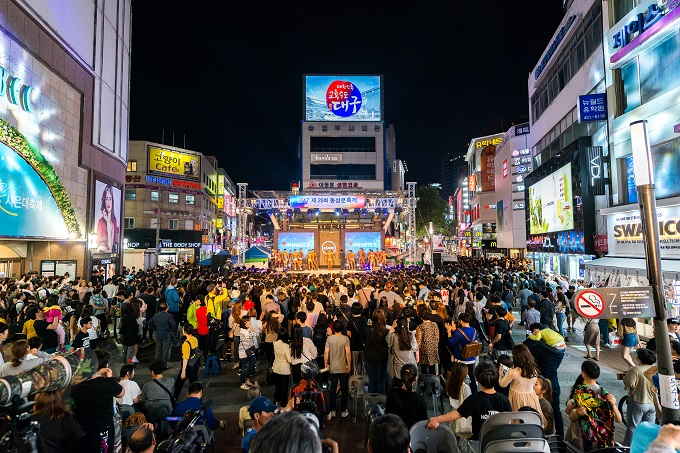
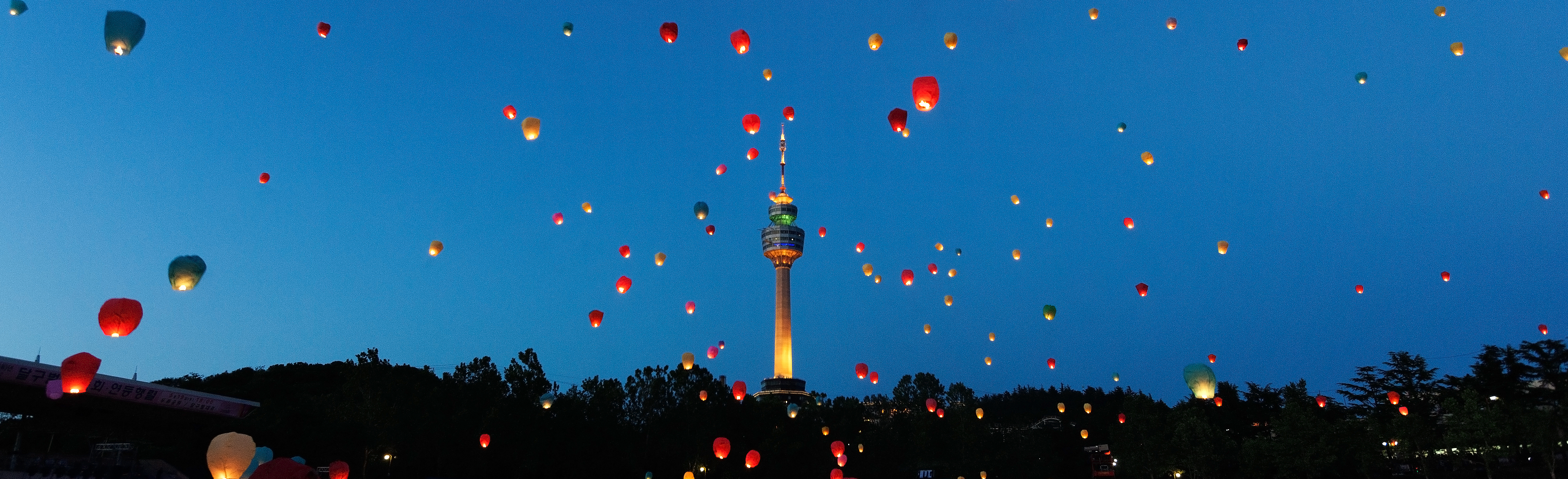
- Beomeo Intersection at Downtown Daegu Bank Park The ARC Suseongmot Lake Duryu Park Sincheon Stream Dongseong-ro 83 Tower

- Flag Logo
- Interactive map of Daegu
- Location within South Korea Location within Asia Location within Earth
- Coordinates: 35°52′18″N 128°36′06″E
- Country: South Korea
- Region: Yeongnam
- Districts: 9 districts

Government
  - Type: Mayor–council
  - Mayor: Choo Kyung-ho (People Power)
  - Body: Daegu Metropolitan Council

Area
  - Metropolitan city: 1,499.51 km^{2} (578.96 sq mi)
- Elevation: 106 m (348 ft)

Population (January 2026)
  - Metropolitan city: 2,351,461
  - Density: 1,568.15/km^{2} (4,061.50/sq mi)
  - Metro: 3,466,452
  - Dialect: Gyeongsang
- Demonym: Daeguite

GDP (Nominal, 2023)
  - Total: KRW 73 trillion (US$ 58 billion)
  - Per capita: US$ 26,736
- Area code: +82-53
- ISO 3166 code: KR-27
- Flower: Magnolia
- Tree: Fir
- Bird: Magpie
- Website: Official website (English)

Korean name
- Hangul: 대구광역시
- Hanja: 大邱廣域市
- RR: Daegu-gwangyeoksi
- MR: Taegu-gwangyŏksi

Daegu (Korean: 대구; [tɛ.ɡu]), formerly spelled Taegu (Note: This romanization of the city's name is in McCune–Reischauer. It was used prior to the official adoption of the Revised Romanization by the South Korean government in 2000. In the 19th century, Daegu was also known in English sources as Tai-Kou; in the first half of the 20th century during Japanese rule it was known as Taikyu.) and officially Daegu Metropolitan City (대구광역시), is a city in southeastern South Korea. It is the third-largest urban agglomeration in South Korea after Seoul and Busan; the fourth-largest metropolitan city in the nation with over 2.3 million residents, and the second-largest city after Busan in the Yeongnam region in southeastern South Korea. Daegu and the surrounding North Gyeongsang Province are often referred to as Daegu-Gyeongbuk, with a total population of over 5 million.

Daegu is located in south-eastern Korea about 80 km (50 mi) from the coast, near the Geumho River and its mainstream, Nakdong River in Gyeongsang Province. The Daegu basin is the central plain of the Yeongnam region. In ancient times, the Daegu area was part of the proto-kingdom Jinhan. Subsequently, Daegu came under the control of the Silla Kingdom, which unified the Korean Peninsula. During the Joseon period, the city was the capital of Gyeongsang Province, one of the traditional eight provinces of the country.

Daegu was an economic motor of Korea during the 1960s–1980s period. The humid subtropical climate of Daegu is ideal for producing high-quality apples, thus the nickname, "Apple City". Daegu is also known as "Textile City", as textiles used to be the main industry of the city. With the establishment of the Daegu-Gyeongbuk Free Economic Zone, Daegu currently focuses on fostering fashion and high-tech industries.

== History ==
=== Prehistory and early history ===
Archaeological investigations in the Greater Daegu area have revealed a large number of settlements and burials of the prehistoric Mumun pottery period (around 1500–300 BC). In fact, some of the earliest evidence of Mumun settlement in Gyeongsangdo have been excavated from Siji-dong and Seobyeon-dong. Dongcheon-dong is one of the substantial Mumun agricultural villages that have been excavated. The Dongcheon-dong site dates back to the Middle Mumun (around 850–550 BC) and contains the remains of many prehistoric pit-houses and agricultural fields. Megalithic burials (dolmens) have also been found in large numbers in Daegu.

Ancient historical texts indicate that during the Proto–Three Kingdoms (Mahan, Jinhan, and Byeonhan) period, Daegu was the site of a chiefdom or walled-town polity known from that time, according to historical records, as Dalgubeol. It was absorbed into the kingdom of Silla no later than the fifth century. The vestiges of the wall can be seen, and relics have been excavated in the current Dalseong Park.

=== Silla ===
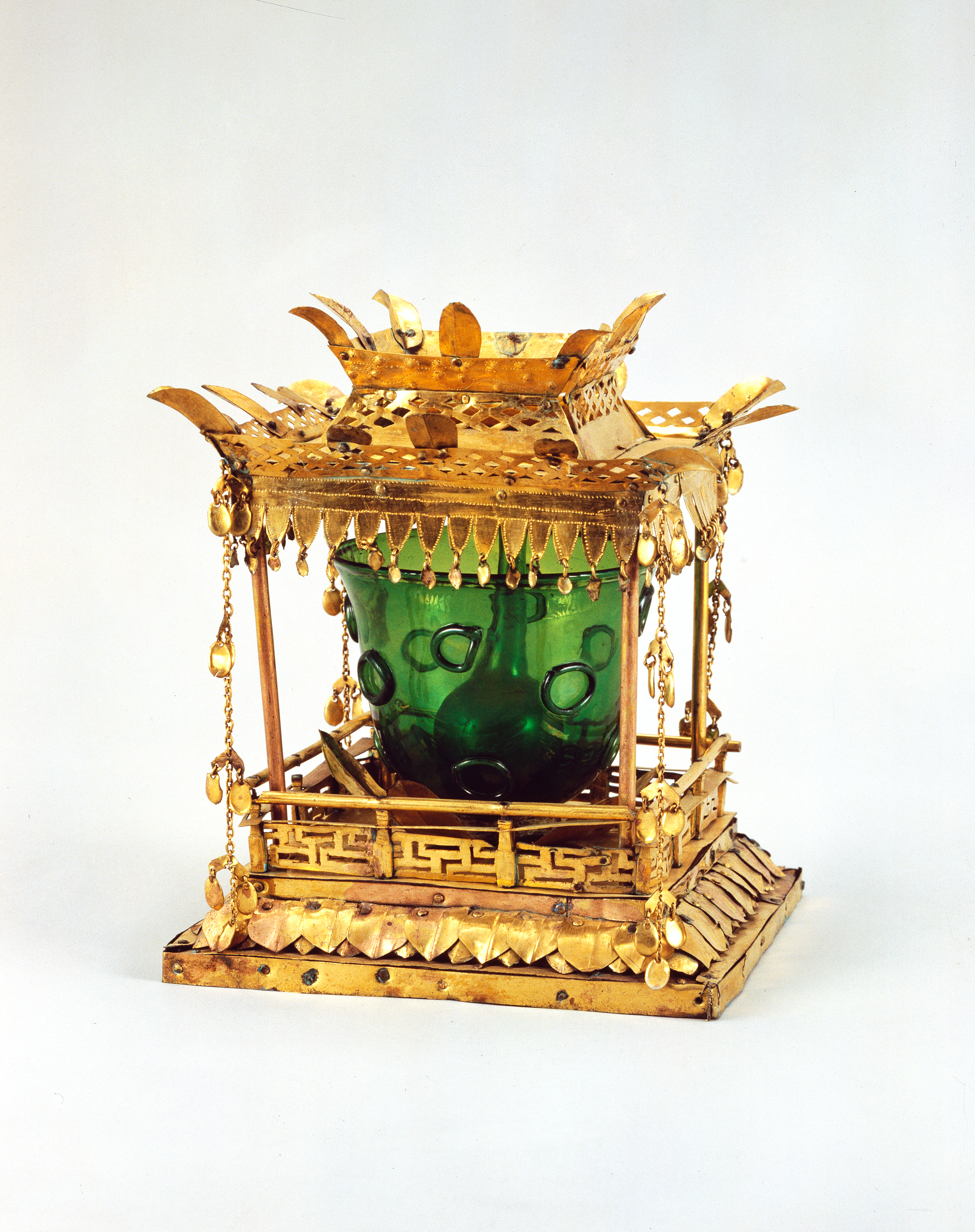
Reliquary from eighth-century Silla, Daegu National Museum

Silla succeeded in unifying the Korean peninsula by defeating the other kingdoms of Baekje and Goguryeo in the late seventh century, partly due to assistance from China's Tang dynasty. Shortly thereafter, in 689, Silla's King Sinmun considered moving the capital from Gyeongju to Daegu, but was unable to do so. This initiative is known only through a single line in the Samguk sagi, a most valued historical record of ancient Korea by Koryeo dynasty historian Kim Pusik, but it is presumed to indicate both an attempt by the Silla king to reinforce royal authority and the entrenched resistance of the Gyeongju political elites that was the likely cause of the move's failure. The city was given its current name in 757.

In the late 1990s, archaeologists excavated a large-scale fortified Silla site in Dongcheon-dong, Buk-gu. The site at Locality 2 consists of the remains of 39 raised-floor buildings enclosed by a formidable ditch-and-palisade system. The excavators hypothesize that the fortified site was a permanent military encampment or barracks. Archaeologists also uncovered a large Silla village dating to the sixth to seventh centuries AD at Siji-dong.

=== Later Three Kingdoms and Goryeo ===
During the Later Three Kingdoms period, 892–936, Daegu was initially aligned with Later Baekje. In 927, northern Daegu was the site of the Battle of Gong Mountain between the forces of Goryeo under Wang Kŏn and those of Later Baekje under Kyŏn Hwŏn. In this battle, the forces of Goryeo were crushed and Wang Kŏn himself was saved only by the heroic deed of his general Sin Sung-gyŏm. However, the atrocities of the Later Baekje forces at this time apparently changed local sympathizers to favor Wang Kŏn, who later became the king of Goryeo.

Numerous place names and local legends in the area still bear witness to the historic battle of 927. Among these are "Ansim", which literally means "peace of mind", said to be the first place where Wang Geon dared to stop after escaping the battle, and "Banwol", or half-moon, where he is said to have stopped and admired the moon before returning to Goryeo. A statue commemorating the battle now stands in northern Daegu, as does a memorial to Sin Sung-gyŏm.

In the Goryeo period, the first edition of the Tripitaka Koreana was stored in Daegu, at the temple of Buinsa. However, this edition was destroyed when the temple was sacked in 1254, during the Mongol invasions of Korea.

=== Joseon ===
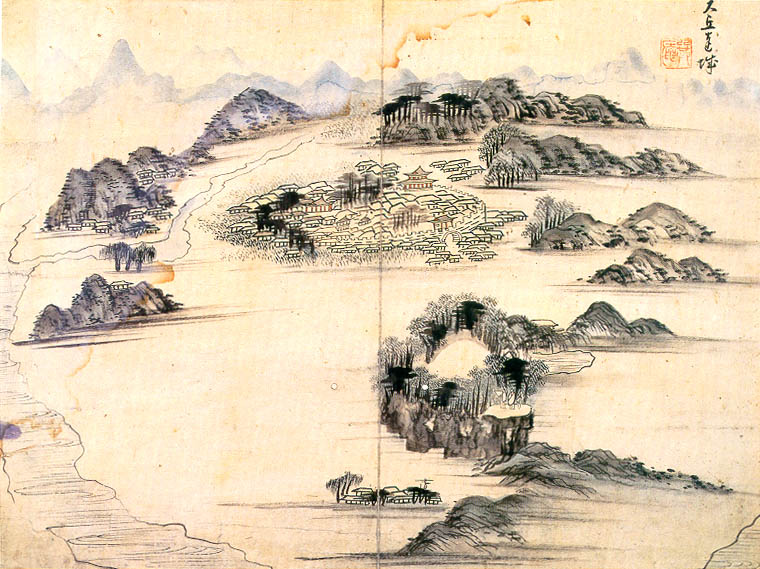
Daegu in the 18th century

Daegu served as an important transportation center during the Joseon dynasty, being located in the middle of the Great Yeongnam Road which ran between Seoul and Busan, at the junction of this arterial road and the roads to Gyeongju and Jinju.

In 1601, Daegu became the administrative capital of the Gyeongsang Province, which is currently Daegu, Busan, Ulsan, North Gyeongsang Province, and South Gyeongsang Province. At about that time, the city began to grow into a major city. The status continued for nearly 300 years, and the city has been transformed as the capital of Gyeongsangbuk-do since Gyeongsang-do was divided into two provinces, Gyeongsangbuk-do (northern Gyeongsang-province) and Gyeongsangnam-do (southern one) in 1896.

Daegu's first regular markets were established during the late Joseon period. The most famous of these is the Yangnyeongsi herbal medicine market. This became a center of herbal trade in Joseon, and even attracted buyers from neighboring countries. Traders from Japan, who were not permitted to leave the Nakdong River valley, hired messengers to visit the market on their behalf. Seomun Market, which stood at the city's west gate at that time, was one of the top-three markets in the Joseon period.

=== Korean Empire and colonial rule ===
Japanese imperialism forcibly opened up Korea's markets beginning in the late 19th century. In 1895, Daegu became the site of one of the country's first modern post offices as a part of the Kabo reforms introduced in the aftermath of the First Sino-Japanese war.

Beginning in the late 1890s, increasing numbers of foreign merchants and workers started to visit Daegu, which emerged as a modern transportation center of the newly constructed Gyeongbu Line main railroad connecting Seoul and Busan.

In 1905, the old fortress wall was destroyed. As a tribute to the wall, streets that now run where the wall once stood have been named Bukseongno, Namseongno, Dongseongno and Seoseongno, which translates as "north fortress street", "south fortress street", "east fortress street" and "west fortress street" respectively.

Emblem of Taikyu-fu (Daegu Prefecture), when Daegu was under Japanese rule

Independence movements against imperial aggression flourished in Daegu, beginning as early as 1898, when a branch of the Independence Club was established in the town. As the demise of the Korean Empire approached in 1907, local citizens led by Seo Sang-don organized the National Debt Repayment Movement. The movement spread nationwide, collecting many individual donations toward repaying the national debt. Rebellions continued after the 1910 annexation to Japan, notably during the March First Movement of 1919. At that time, four major demonstrations took place in Daegu, involving an estimated 23,000 citizens.

=== After 1945 ===
In 1946, the Daegu October Incident took place, one of the most serious social disorders since the foundation of the Republic of Korea. On October 1, Korean national police killed three student demonstrators and injured many others. It was also the site of major demonstrations on February 28, 1960, prior to the presidential election of that year.

Daegu and all of North Gyeongsang province had heavy guerrilla activities in the late 1940s, as thousands of refugees shied away from the fighting in Jeolla province and sought shelters in Daegu. In November 1948, a unit in Daegu joined the mutiny which had begun in Yeosu the previous month. As in many other areas during the Korean War, political killings of dissenters were widespread.

During the Korean War, heavy fighting occurred nearby along the Nakdong River. Daegu sat inside the Pusan Perimeter, however, so it remained in South Korean hands throughout the war. The fighting that prevented North Korean troops from crossing the Nakdong River has become known as the Battle of Taegu.

In the second half of the 20th century, the city underwent explosive growth, and the population has increased more than tenfold since the end of the Korean War. The city was politically favored during the 18-year-long rule of Park Chung Hee, when it and the surrounding area served as his political base. Daegu champions conservative political ideas and movements today and is a political base for the People Power Party.

In the 1980s, Daegu separated from Gyeongsangbuk-do and became a separately administered provincial-level directly governed city (Jikhalsi), and was redesignated as a metropolitan city (Gwangyeoksi) in 1995. Today, Daegu is the third-largest metropolitan area in Korea with respect to both population and commerce.

Since 1990, Daegu has suffered two of South Korea's worst mass casualty disasters: the 1995 Daegu gas explosions, which killed 101 people, and the 2003 Daegu subway fire, which killed 192 people.

In February 2020, Daegu was the epicenter of the COVID-19 pandemic in South Korea.

In July 2023, the Gunwi County of North Gyeongsang Province was integrated into Daegu. Daegu was the host city of the 22nd World Energy Congress, the 2011 World Championships in Athletics and the 2003 Summer Universiade. It also hosted four matches in the 2002 FIFA World Cup.

== Politics ==
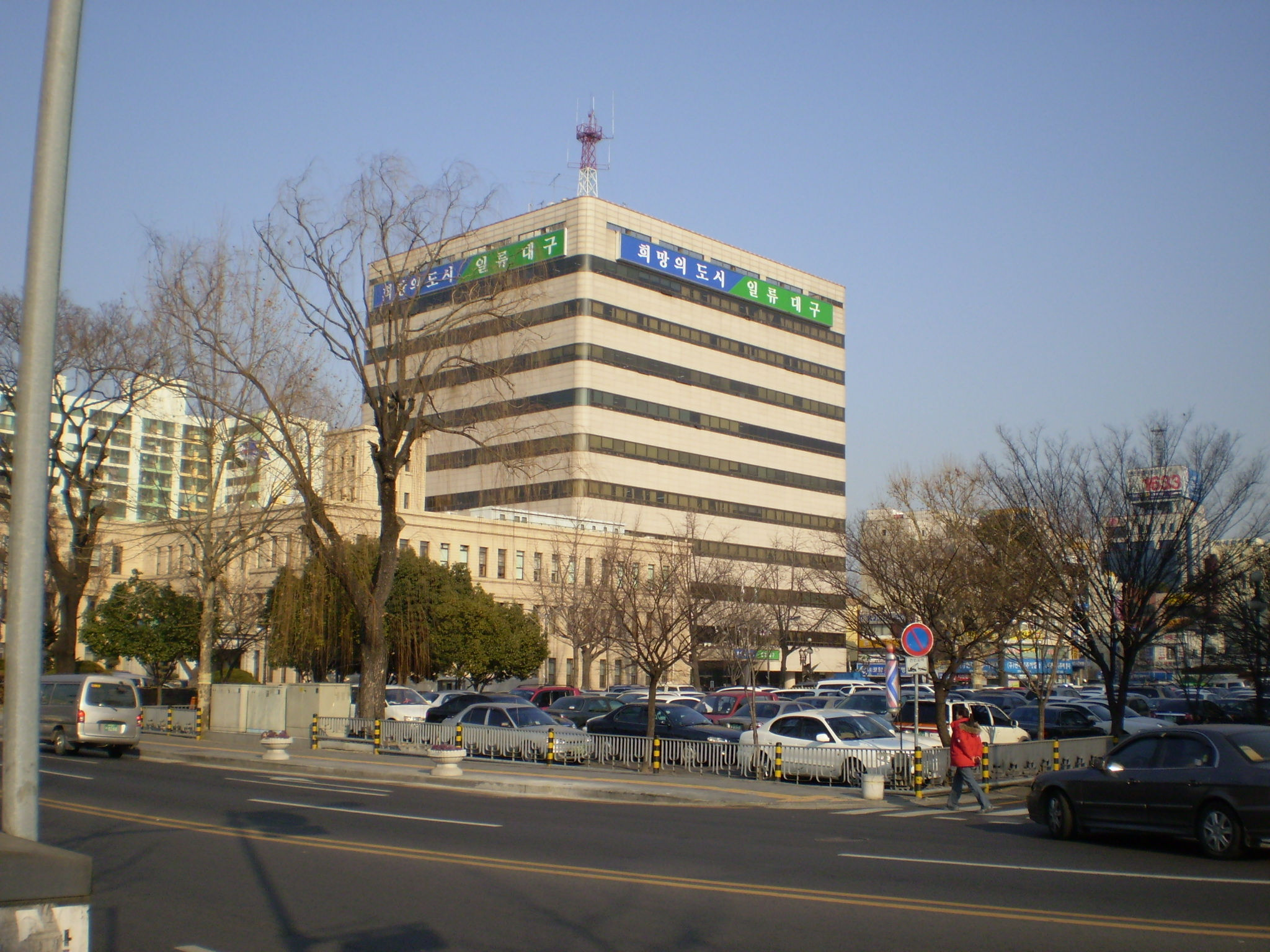
Daegu City Hall

Two local governments are in the city, the Daegu Metropolitan Government in Jung District and Gyeongbuk Provincial Government in Buk District. The provincial government will be relocated to Andong in its proper province, Gyeongbuk. As a result, the provincial government office was relocated to Andong in January 2023. The mayor and heads of the city's eight districts are directly elected by the citizens every four years. The city council has 29 members which consist of 26 from the same number of electoral districts and three proportional representations. They are also directly elected every four years. Most of them are the members of the People Power Party, the main conservative political party in South Korea. Daegu is a stronghold for the party and has produced four Presidents of the Republic of Korea thus far: Park Chung Hee, Chun Doo-hwan, Roh Tae-woo and Park Geun-hye. Park Chung Hee and Chun Doo-hwan were born in other cities but they moved to Daegu and spent childhood in Daegu. As the capital of the Korean conservatives, the city has wielded strong political influence in elections.

=== Administrative divisions ===
Administrative divisions

Daegu is divided into 7 districts (Gu) and 2 counties (Gun)

- Jung District (중구; 中區; lit. 'central district')
- Dong District (동구; 東區; lit. 'east district')
- Seo District (서구; 西區; lit. 'west district')
- Nam District (남구; 南區; lit. 'south district')
- Buk District (북구; 北區; lit. 'north district')
- Suseong District (수성구; 壽城區)
- Dalseo District (달서구; 達西區)
- Dalseong County (달성군; 達城郡)
- Gunwi County (군위군; 軍威郡)

== Geography ==
=== Topography ===
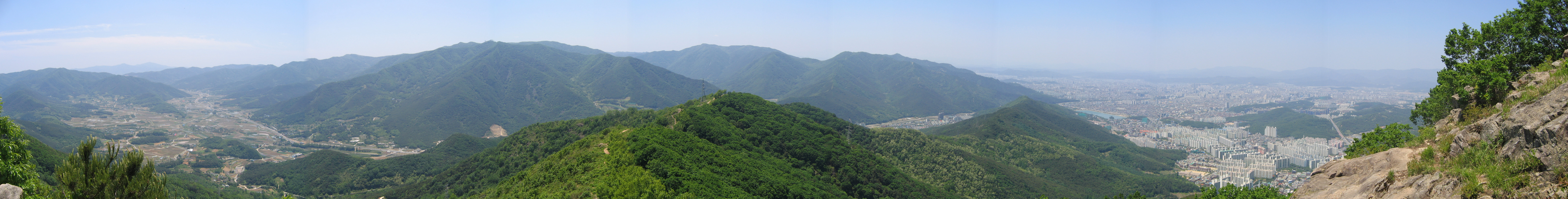
View of the city of Daegu, with Jisan-dong and Beommul-dong

Daegu sits in a basin surrounded by low mountains: Palgongsan to the north, Biseulsan to the south, Waryongsan to the west, and a series of smaller hills in the east. The Geumho River flows along the northern and eastern edges of the city, emptying in the Nakdong River west of the city.

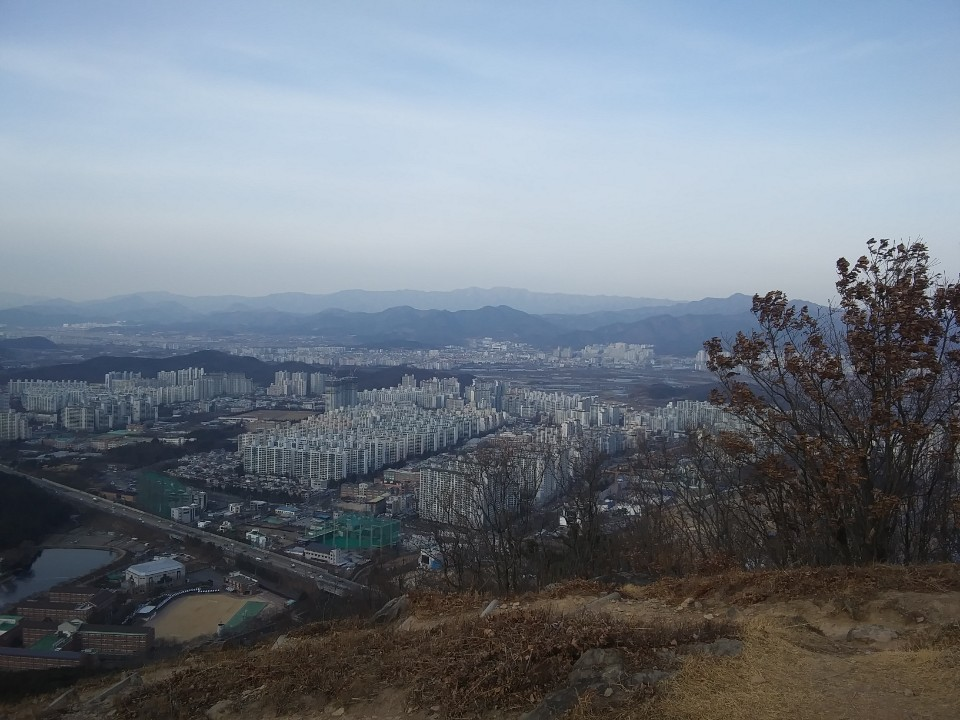
View of Daegu Suseong District, and the Gosan area

=== Climate ===
Daegu

Climate chart (precipitation, max. and min. temperature)
J	F	M	A	M	J	J	A	S	O	N	D
19 6 −3	25 9 −1	49 14 3	71 21 9	78 26 14	129 29 19	224 31 23	245 31 23	142 27 18	50 22 11	30 15 5	19 8 −1
- █ Average max. and min. temperatures in °C
- █ Precipitation totals in mm
Imperial conversion
J	F	M	A	M	J	J	A	S	O	N	D
0.7 43 27	1 48 30	1.9 58 38	2.8 69 48	3.1 78 57	5.1 84 66	8.8 87 73	9.7 88 74	5.6 81 64	2 72 53	1.2 59 41	0.7 46 30
- █ Average max. and min. temperatures in °F
- █ Precipitation totals in inches

The majority of Daegu lies in a humid subtropical climate (Köppen: Cwa). In Holdridge climate classification, Daegu has a warm temperate moist forest climate. The mountains that comprise the basin trap hot and humid air. Similarly, in winter, cold air lies in the basin. The area receives little precipitation except during the rainy season of summer and is sunny throughout much of the year. Data gathered since 1961 indicates that the mean temperature for January, the coldest month in Daegu, is 1.1 °C (34 °F) and that for August, the warmest month, is 26.7 °C (80 °F). The city's lowest record temperature was −20.2 °C (−4 °F), and the city's highest record temperature was 40.0 °C (104 °F). In 2014, high temperatures led to the emergence of a new term called Daefrica (대프리카, Daegu+Africa) starting with the internet community, and has been used in the media, broadcasting, etc. In 2015, a traffic cone in Daegu melted in the heat. Summers in Daegu are some of the hottest in the Korean peninsula. In 2023, on July 31 and August 3, median strips could not overcome the heat and melted in different parts of the same district in Daegu.

Climate data for Daegu (1991–2020 normals, extremes 1907–present)
Month	Jan	Feb	Mar	Apr	May	Jun	Jul	Aug	Sep	Oct	Nov	Dec	Year
Record high °C (°F)	16.5 (61.7)	24.4 (75.9)	27.9 (82.2)	32.0 (89.6)	37.4 (99.3)	38.0 (100.4)	39.7 (103.5)	40.0 (104.0)	37.5 (99.5)	31.8 (89.2)	27.3 (81.1)	20.8 (69.4)	40.0 (104.0)
Mean daily maximum °C (°F)	5.9 (42.6)	8.8 (47.8)	14.2 (57.6)	20.6 (69.1)	25.7 (78.3)	28.7 (83.7)	30.8 (87.4)	31.3 (88.3)	27.0 (80.6)	22.0 (71.6)	14.9 (58.8)	7.9 (46.2)	19.8 (67.6)
Daily mean °C (°F)	1.1 (34.0)	3.5 (38.3)	8.4 (47.1)	14.5 (58.1)	19.7 (67.5)	23.4 (74.1)	26.3 (79.3)	26.7 (80.1)	22.1 (71.8)	16.2 (61.2)	9.4 (48.9)	3.0 (37.4)	14.5 (58.1)
Mean daily minimum °C (°F)	−2.9 (26.8)	−1.1 (30.0)	3.3 (37.9)	8.8 (47.8)	14.1 (57.4)	18.8 (65.8)	22.8 (73.0)	23.1 (73.6)	18.0 (64.4)	11.4 (52.5)	4.8 (40.6)	−1.2 (29.8)	10.0 (50.0)
Record low °C (°F)	−20.2 (−4.4)	−16.4 (2.5)	−10.9 (12.4)	−6.0 (21.2)	1.8 (35.2)	7.8 (46.0)	11.3 (52.3)	12.3 (54.1)	6.2 (43.2)	−2.0 (28.4)	−8.6 (16.5)	−15.2 (4.6)	−20.2 (−4.4)
Average precipitation mm (inches)	18.6 (0.73)	25.4 (1.00)	49.0 (1.93)	70.6 (2.78)	77.9 (3.07)	129.2 (5.09)	223.9 (8.81)	245.3 (9.66)	142.4 (5.61)	50.1 (1.97)	29.7 (1.17)	18.7 (0.74)	1,080.8 (42.55)
Average precipitation days (≥ 0.1 mm)	4.5	4.7	7.1	8.2	8.8	9.4	13.9	13.4	9.3	5.2	5.1	4.4	94.0
Average snowy days	4.2	2.2	1.4	0.1	0.0	0.0	0.0	0.0	0.0	0.0	0.5	3.0	11.4
Average relative humidity (%)	51.4	49.8	49.8	50.8	55.8	63.8	71.7	72.2	69.3	62.8	58.2	53.3	59.1
Mean monthly sunshine hours	195.5	188.6	210.8	220.2	232.6	175.1	153.0	156.6	164.0	206.2	183.9	189.4	2,275.9
Percentage possible sunshine	62.2	60.3	54.7	56.1	52.7	42.1	34.1	39.5	43.2	58.1	58.3	62.7	50.9
Average ultraviolet index	2	4	5	7	9	10	10	10	8	5	3	2	6
Source 1: Korea Meteorological Administration (percent sunshine 1981–2010)
Source 2: Weather Atlas (UV)

The climate of Gunwi County, which is the northern area of Daegu and was incorporated into Daegu from North Gyeongsang Province in July 2023, is quite different from most parts of Daegu. Gunwi straddles the borderline between a humid continental climate (Dwa) and a humid subtropical climate (Cwa), and has colder winters than other areas of Daegu.

Climate data for Gunwi County, Daegu (1993–2020 normals)
Month	Jan	Feb	Mar	Apr	May	Jun	Jul	Aug	Sep	Oct	Nov	Dec	Year
Mean daily maximum °C (°F)	4.2 (39.6)	7.4 (45.3)	13.5 (56.3)	20.1 (68.2)	25.5 (77.9)	28.7 (83.7)	30.5 (86.9)	31.2 (88.2)	26.6 (79.9)	21.0 (69.8)	13.5 (56.3)	6.1 (43.0)	19.0 (66.2)
Daily mean °C (°F)	−2.7 (27.1)	0.1 (32.2)	5.6 (42.1)	12.0 (53.6)	17.5 (63.5)	21.8 (71.2)	24.9 (76.8)	25.2 (77.4)	19.8 (67.6)	12.8 (55.0)	5.8 (42.4)	−1.0 (30.2)	11.8 (53.2)
Mean daily minimum °C (°F)	−8.6 (16.5)	−6.4 (20.5)	−1.5 (29.3)	4.3 (39.7)	10.1 (50.2)	15.9 (60.6)	20.6 (69.1)	20.9 (69.6)	15.1 (59.2)	7.0 (44.6)	−0.3 (31.5)	−6.7 (19.9)	5.9 (42.6)
Average precipitation mm (inches)	14.4 (0.57)	20.2 (0.80)	40.5 (1.59)	70.6 (2.78)	74.1 (2.92)	114.2 (4.50)	197.5 (7.78)	228.1 (8.98)	133.0 (5.24)	51.8 (2.04)	30.2 (1.19)	12.9 (0.51)	987.5 (38.88)
Average precipitation days (≥ 0.1 mm)	2.9	3.5	5.8	6.8	6.9	8.3	12.3	12.1	8.0	4.9	4.8	2.9	79.2
Source: Korea Meteorological Administration

== Economy ==
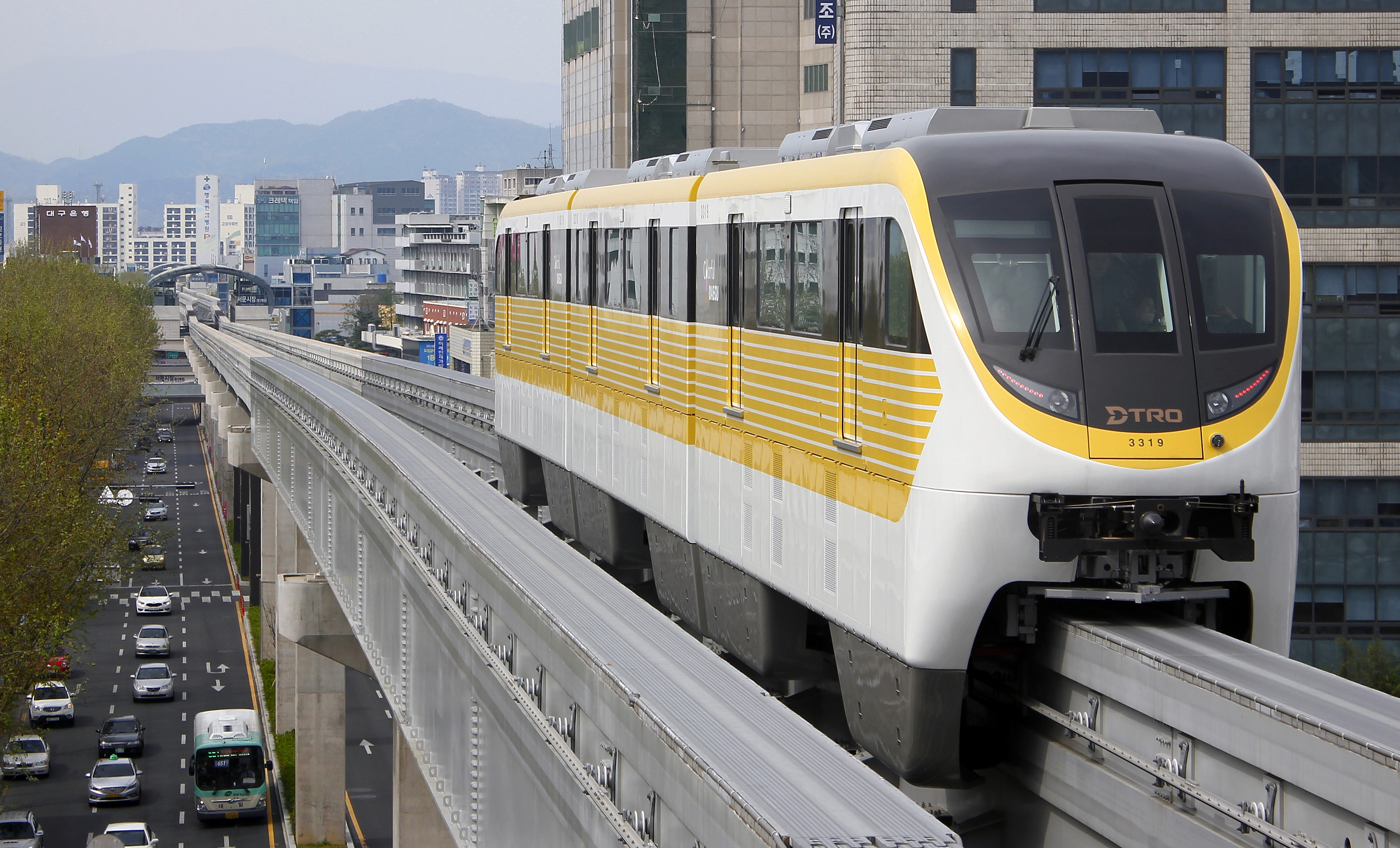
Daegu Metro Line 3

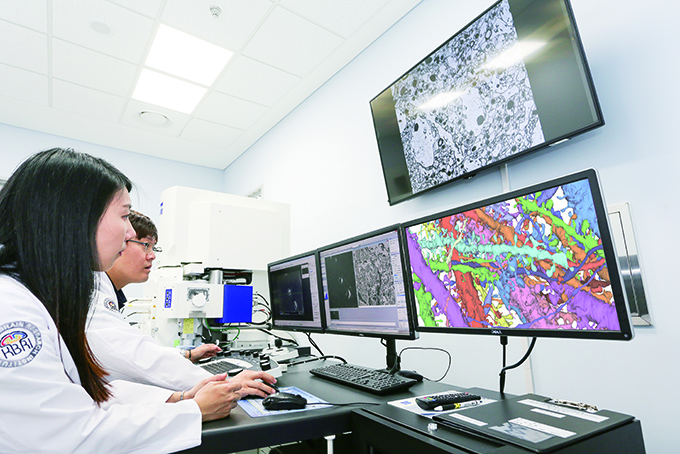
Korean Brain Research Center - Advanced Equipment Center

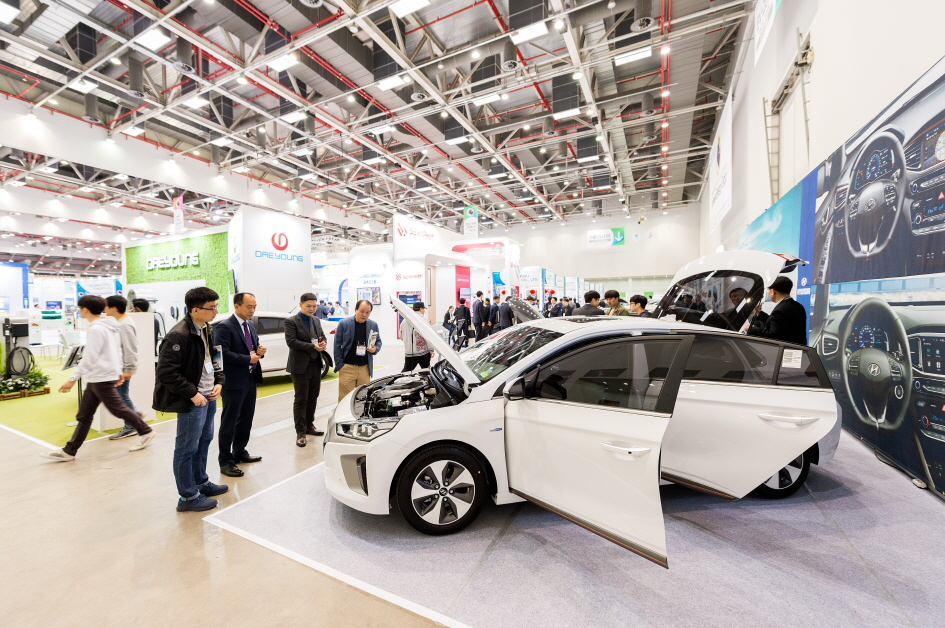
2017 Green Energy Expo

Daegu is a manufacturing industry city. The major industries are textiles, metals and machinery. In 2021, Daegu had a regional GDP of $44,144 million. Many companies such as Daegu Bank, Korea Delphi, Hwasung corp., and TaeguTec are situated in this city, and Samsung and Kolon were founded here. Numerous factories are located in the industrial complexes situated on the west and north sides of the city including the Seongseo Industrial Complex, West Daegu Industrial Complex and the Daegu Dyeing Industrial Complex.

The city is the economic and industrial core of the Daegu-Gyeongbuk region, one of the major industrial areas in Korea. It accounted for as much as 94 percent of Korea's trade surplus in 2006. The electronics industries in Gumi and the steel industries in Pohang provided great services to that surplus. World-leading manufacturing facilities for Anycall (Samsung Mobile) and POSCO's main factories are located near the city. Daegu and its neighboring cities were designated for the Daegu-Gyeongbuk Free Economic Zone by the central government in 2008. It is specialized companies like Winitech software company in knowledge-based service and manufacturing industries.

Historically, Daegu has been the commercial center of the southern part of the Korean Peninsula with Seoul in the center and Pyongyang in the north (currently North Korea), because of its advantageous location. Some of the large, traditional markets like Seomun Market are still flourishing in the city.

Additionally, Daegu was considered the third major economic city in Korea, after Seoul and Busan. However, due to the decline of the textile industry, which is the heart of Daegu's economy, the overall economic growth of the city has also fallen.

Also, the city is the warmest region in South Korea due to the humid subtropical climate. This climate condition provides the region with high quality apples and oriental melons. The fruit industry is a crucial support for the local economy. Due to the stagnant economy, Daegu's population began to decrease after 2003. Recently, the local government has begun focusing on working towards economic revival and concentrating on improving the city's fashion industry.

=== Fashion industry ===
Beginning in the late 1990s, Daegu has been actively making efforts to promote its fashion industry based on its textile and clothing manufacturing industries under the 'Daegu: Fashion City'. The city opens many exhibitions related to the fashion and textile industries including the Daegu Fashion Fair and Preview in Daegu annually or semi-annually, and invites national institutes. A large new town specializing in the textile-fashion industries is currently under construction in Bongmu-dong, northeastern Daegu. The district, officially named Esiapolis, takes aim at the fashion hub of East Asia. Textile complexes, textile-fashion institutions, an international school, fashion malls as well as residential areas plan to be developed in the district.

== Culture and sightseeing ==
Daegu skyline as seen from KNU's Technopark

Generally, Daegu is known as a conservative city. As well as being the largest inland city in the country beside Seoul it has become one of the major metropolitan areas in the nation. Traditionally, Buddhism has been strong; today there are still many temples. Confucianism is also popular in Daegu, with a large academy based in the city. Neon cross-topped spires of Christian churches can also be seen in the city.

=== Sights ===
The most well-known sight of the city is the stone Buddha called Gatbawi on the top of Gwanbong, Palgongsan. It is famous for its stone gat (Korean traditional hat). People from all over the country visit the place, because they believe that the Buddha will grant one's single desire. Administratively, the site itself is located in the neighboring city, Gyeongsan, North Gyeongsang Province.

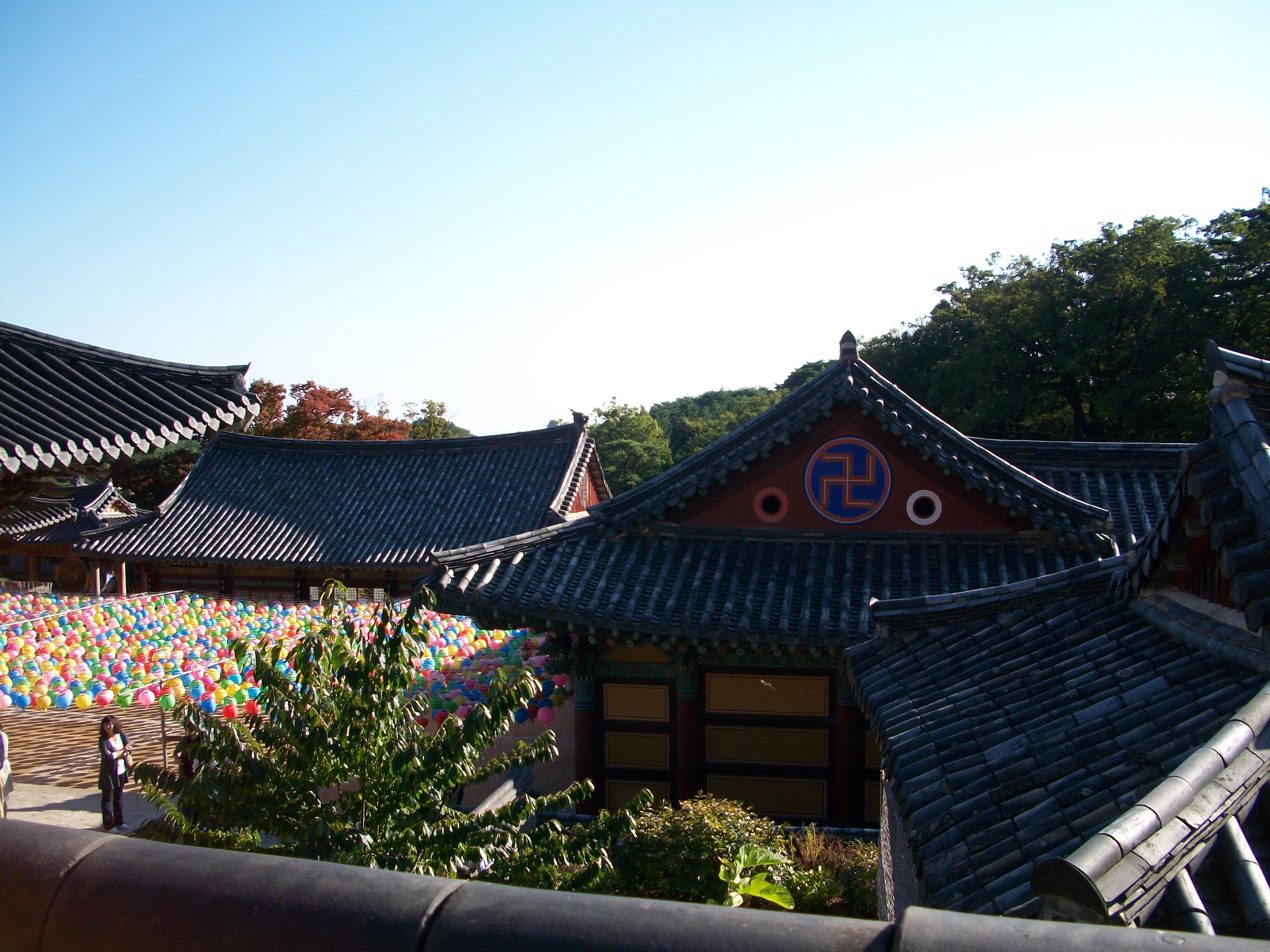
Scenery of Donghwasa

On the outskirts of the city, the mountains keep many traditional temples such as Donghwasa, Pagyesa, and Buinsa. Donghwasa is a Buddhist temple that was built by Priest Geukdal-hwasang in 493, and many artifacts of the period are found around the temple. The International Tourist Zen Meditation Center is Korea's only Zen-themed center. Some lecture halls or memorial halls such as Dodong-seowon (도동서원; 道東書院) and Nokdong-seowon (녹동서원; 鹿洞書院) are also located in the suburbs.

Old villages have been preserved, such as the Otgol village (Gyeongju Choi clan's original residence area) and the Inheung village (Nampyeong Mun's). In the urban area, the Joseon period's administrative or educational buildings including Gyeongsang-gamyeong (경상감영; 慶尙監營) and Daegu-hyanggyo (대구향교; 大邱鄕校) also remain. The main gateway of the city in that period called Yeongnam-jeilmun (영남제일문; 嶺南第一門, meaning the first gateway in Yeongnam), has been restored in Mangudang Park. Western style modern architecture like Gyesan Cathedral and the old building of Jeil Church are preserved across the urban area. Gyesan Cathedral is the third oldest gothic church building in Korea and the cathedral of the Roman Catholic Archdiocese of Daegu which is one of three archdioceses in South Korea. Several buildings, in the present Keisung Academy and the KNU middle/high school, are famous too.

Yangnyeongsi (약령시; 藥令市) in Namseongno (often called Yakjeon-golmok) is the oldest market for Korean medicinal herbs in the country with a history of 350 years. Bongsan-dong which has some art galleries and studios is being developed as the artistic center of the city since the 1990s.

Nearby tourist attractions include Haeinsa—a Buddhist temple that houses the Tripitaka Koreana (a woodblock edition of the Tripitaka and one of the world's oldest extant complete collections of the Buddhist scriptures). Haeinsa is located in Gayasan National Park of Hapcheon, South Gyeongsang Province. The historic city of Gyeongju, North Gyeongsang Province, the capital of the ancient kingdom of Silla is located east of Daegu.

=== Mountains and parks ===
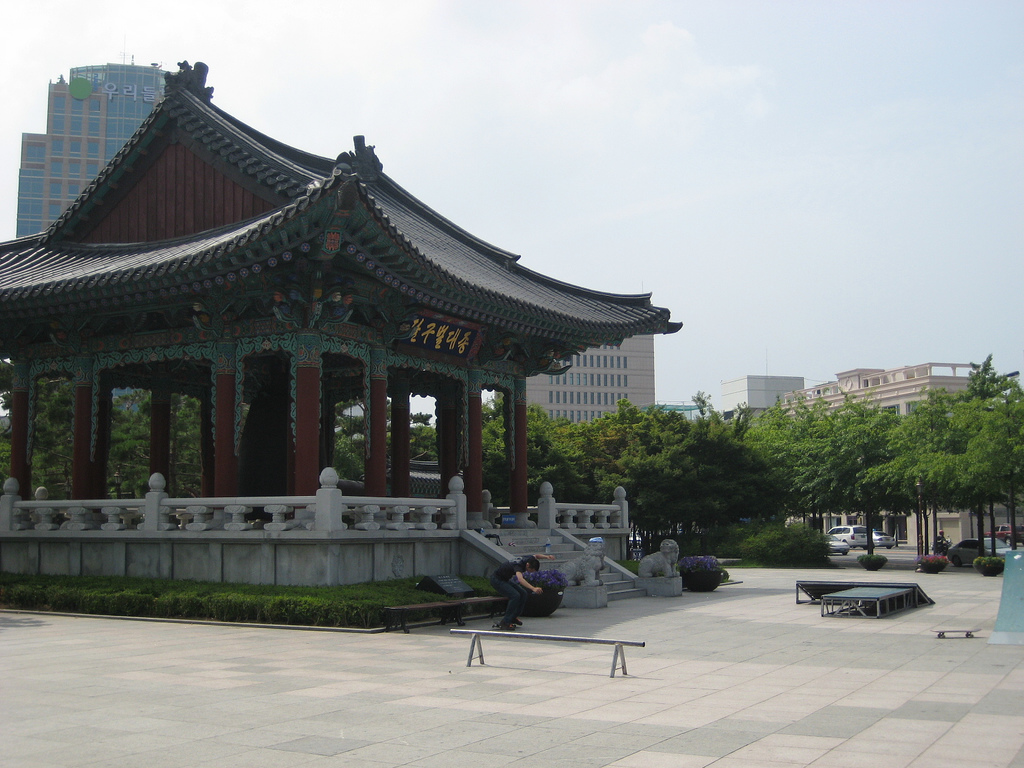
Dalgubeol-daejong, a city bell at the Gukchae Bosang Park

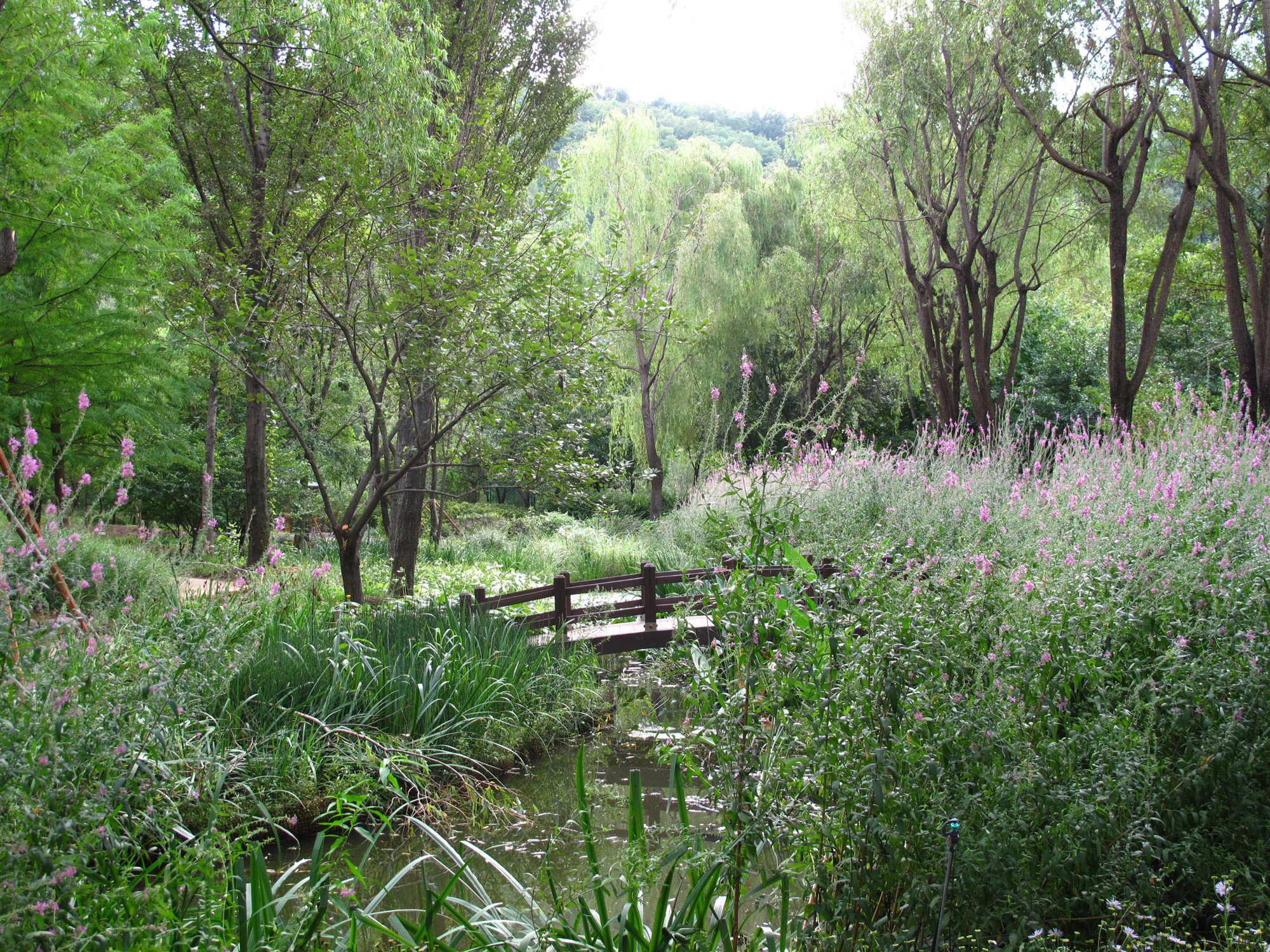
Daegu Botanical Garden bridge

Mt. Palgong, Mt. Biseul, and Mt. Ap are the representative mountains in Daegu. Apsan, just in the southern part of the city, is the closest mountain from the urban area among them. It has many trails, Buddhist temples, a Korean War museum, and a gondola ride to the peak. Additionally, Waryongsan, Hamjisan, and Yongjibong are located in the city. These serve as neighborhood parks to the citizens. Mt. Palgong has a cable car to the summit. There are also hiking trails in the direction of the Donghwasa Temple and Sutaegol Valley.

In the urban area, several small mountains and hills play the same role. Dalseong Park, which sits inside a 1,500-year-old earth fortress, is a historic place of the city. It contains the city's only zoo and some monuments as well as the wall. Duryu Park or Duryusan is a large forest in the middle of the urban area. It has Daegu Tower, Woobang Land, Kolon Bandstand, Duryu Stadium, and many sports facilities. Daegu Tower, also called Woobang Tower or Duryu Tower, is the tallest contemporary structure (202 m) and a symbol of the city. Its observatory commands good views of the surroundings. Woobang Land is the largest amusement park out of the capital area. Many small gardens lie in the heart of the city, such as the National Debt Repayment Movement Memorial Park (Gukchae Bosang Park) and 2·28 Park. The former park includes Dalgubeol-daejong (달구벌대종; 達句伐大鐘), which means the Dalgubeol grand bell. The bell is struck every week and year. There is also a botanical garden with a variety of plants and flowers.

=== Downtown and shopping ===
Dongseongno (동성로; 東城路) is the downtown of Daegu lying from the Daegu station to Jung-ang pachulso (central police station) near the Banwoldang subway station in the center of the city Jung-gu. It has the Jung-angno subway station as the nearest station from its heart. Like its name meaning the street in the east fortress, the eastern part of Daegu-eupseong (대구읍성; 大邱邑城, means the Daegu-Principality Fortress) was situated along this street. The fortress, however, had been demolished in the early 20th century. Although Daegu is the nation's third or fourth largest city, the Dongseongno area form the largest and the broadest downtown area in the whole country except the capital city, Seoul. In most cases, famous brands open their branch shop first here out of the Greater Seoul area.

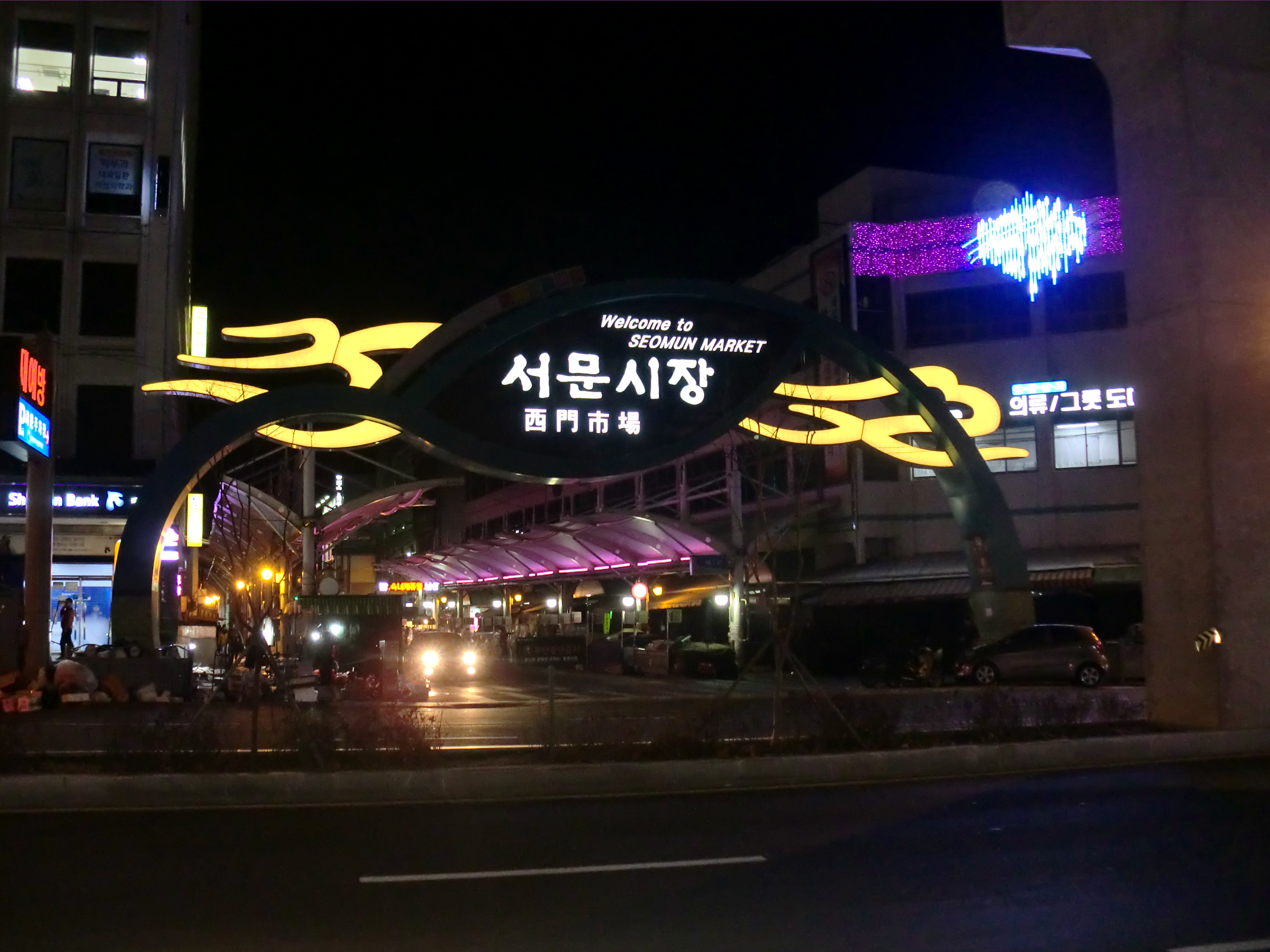
The sign of the Seomun Market

Sub-downtowns in the city have their own commercial powers and colors. The area around the Seongseo Industrial Complex subway station in Dalseo District is a concentration of many amusement spots, and young people easily can be seen around Kyungpook National University in Buk-gu. Deuran-gil (Which means the street inside the field) in Suseong District is known for many restaurants.

The city has a number of department stores. Many of these belong to national or multinational chains, but the local Daegu Department Store also operates two branches, while another local chain, Donga Department Store operates four in the city proper. The six department stores among them gather at the downtown. The traditional markets such as Seomun Market and Chilseong Market sell all sorts of goods.

=== Festivals ===
Many traditional ceremonies and festivals in agrarian society disappeared in the process of modernization. A Confucian ritual ceremony called Seokjeondaeje is held at Daegu-hyanggyo every spring and autumn. The Yangnyeongsi herb medical festival and Otgol village festival are contemporary festivals about traditional culture.

Lately in the city, enthusiasm about performing arts is growing and the local government is trying to meet its demand. Daegu International Opera Festival (DIOF) in October since 2003, Daegu International Musical Festival (DIMF), and Daegu International Bodypainting Festival (DIBF) are three of the most famous festivals on each field in Korea, although they have short histories.

Various festivals in various themes like the Colorful Daegu Festival, Dongseongno festival, Palgongsan maple festival, Biseulsan azalea festival, Korea in Motion Daegu, and so on, are held by the city, each ward, or the specific groups, all through the year.

On August 25 through August 31, 2008, Daegu hosted the first ever Asian Bodypainting Festival, a sister event of the World Bodypainting Festival in Seeboden, Austria.

Each year the city is home to the Daegu International Jazz Festival: http://www.dijf.or.kr/

Every May the "Colorful Daegu Festival" offers performances and art programs including the Colorful Parade. In July, the Daegu Chimac Festival takes place at Duryu Park in Dalseo District, Daegu. The term "chimac" is a portmanteau of chicken and maekju (meaning "beer"). There were over 880,000 visitors in 2015, and one million visitors during the festival in 2016.

=== Daegu 12 views gallery ===
The 12 scenic spots of Daegu selected by Daegu include Palgongsan Mountain, Biseulsan Mountain, Gangjeong Goryeongbo (The Ark), Sincheon, Suseongmot Lake, Dalseongtoseong Fortress, Gyeongsang Gamyeong Park, National Debt Compensation Memorial Park, Dongseongro, Seomun Market, and Daegu Stadium.

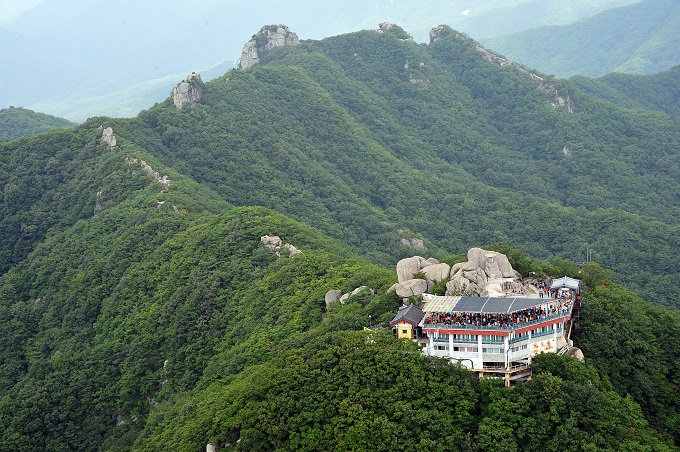
1st view Palgongsan

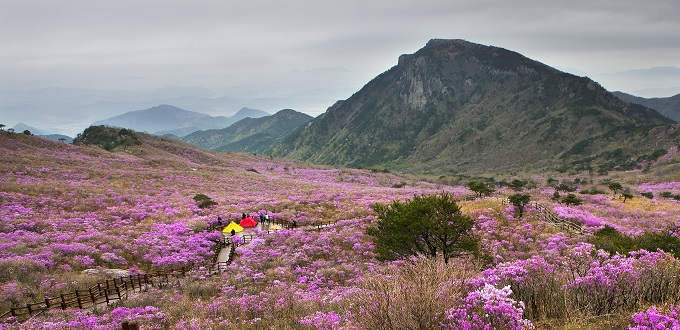
2nd view of Biseulsan

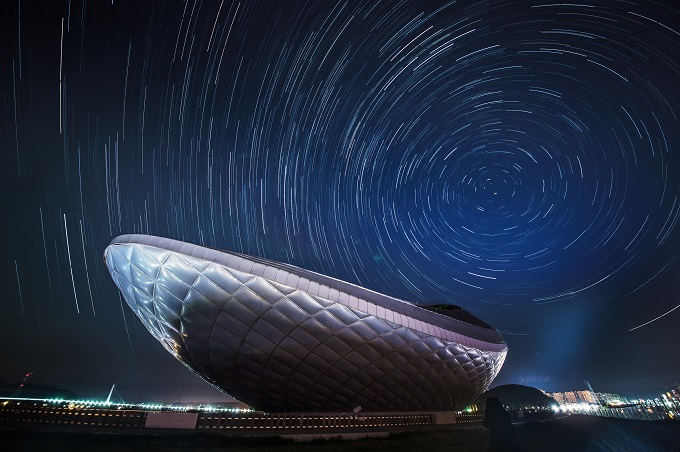
3rd view Gangjeong Goryeong Weir (The Ark)

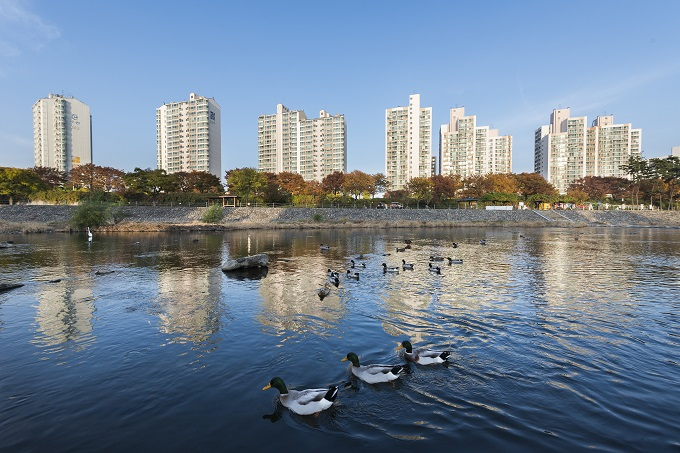
4th Scenic Sincheon

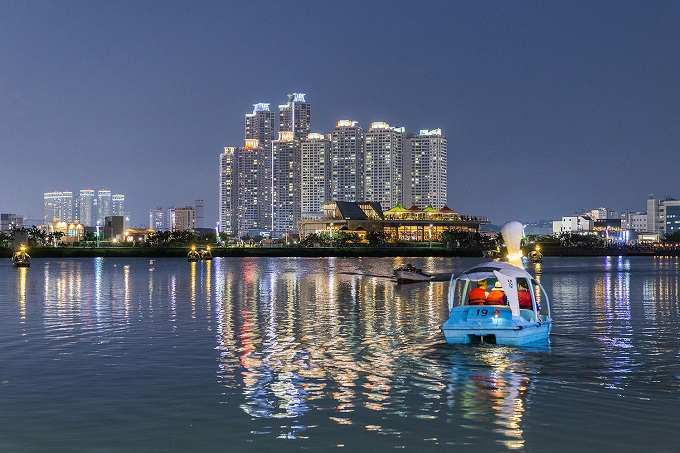
5th Scenic Spots Suseongmot Lake

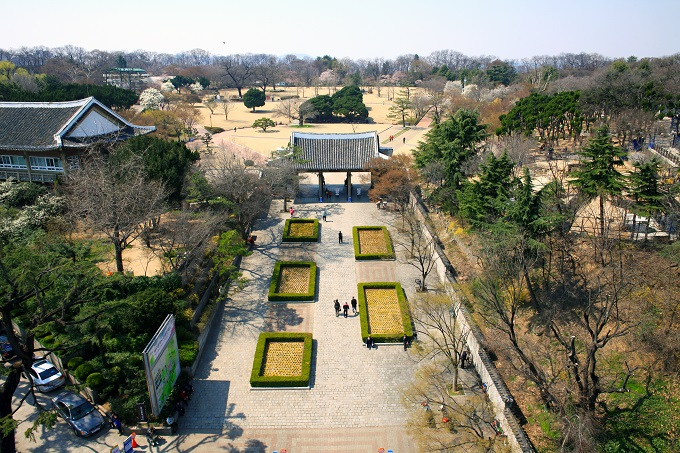
6th Dalseongtoseong Fortress

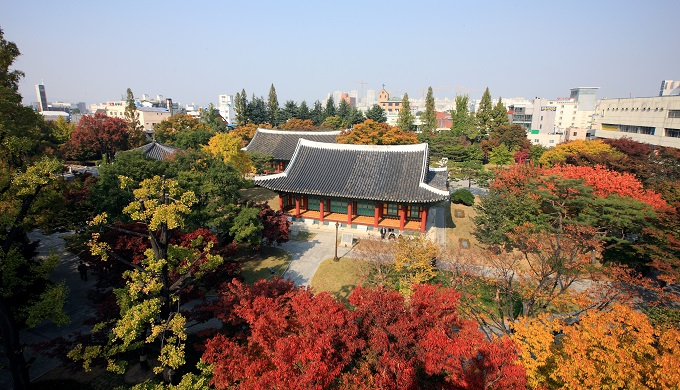
7th Gyeongsang Gamyeong Park

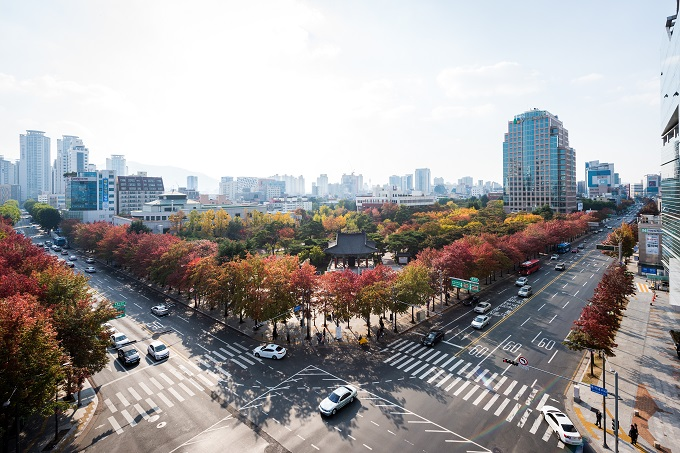
8th Scenic Spots: National Debt Compensation Memorial Park

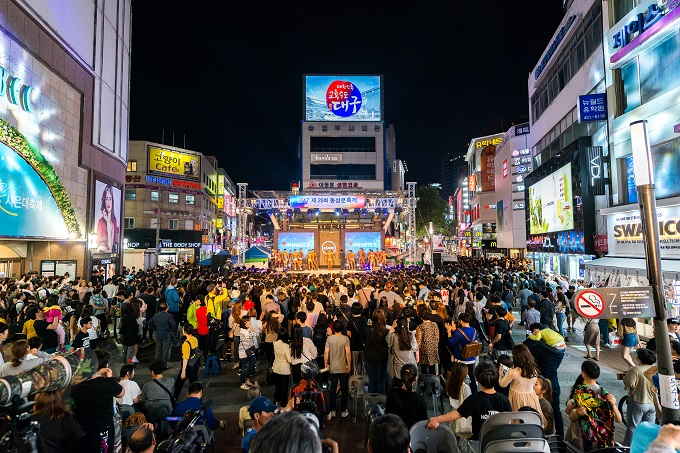
9th view Dongseongro

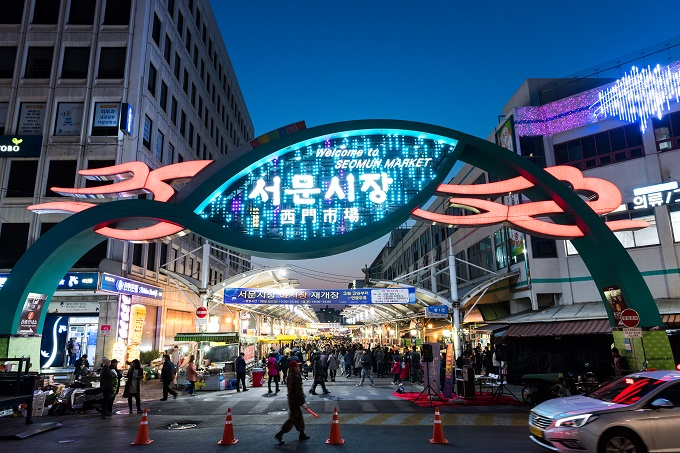
10th Seomun Market

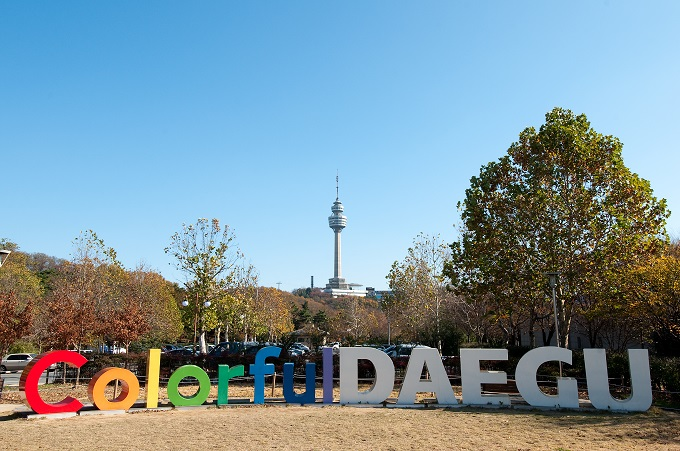
11th Scenery 83 Tower

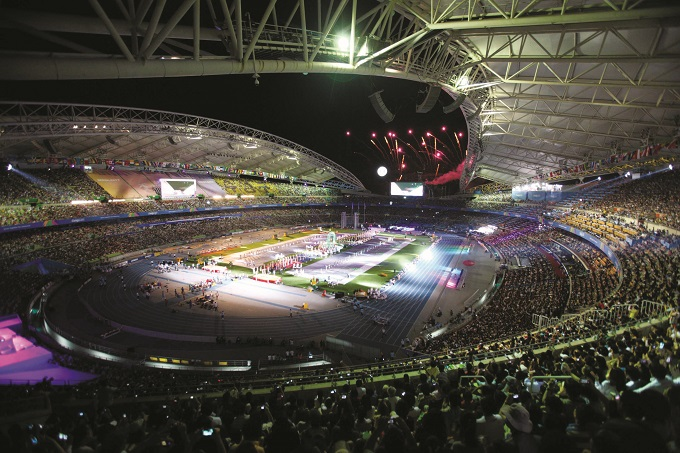
12th view Daegu Stadium

=== Cuisine ===
Daegu cuisine is similar to that consumed in the Yeongnam region. The city is known for certain unique dishes such as:

- Ttaro-gukbap: Daegu is the only part of Korea that eats the rice and soup of gukbap separately
- Mungtigi: pieces of raw beef marinated in a mixture of sesame oil, garlic, and red pepper powder
- Makchang: a dish made with beef abomasum
- Jjimgalbi: braised beef ribs cooked in an aluminum pot with a deep spicy, sweet, and garlicky marinade
- Nonmegi maeuntang: a spicy catfish stew made with a kelp and radish stock
- Bogeo bulgogi: deboned blowfish grilled with beansprouts in a spicy marinade
- Muchimhoe: a salad composed of raw fish, squid, and vegetables in a sweet and spicy sauce
- Yaki udon: spicy seafood noodle dish with vegetables, similar to a dry jjamppong
- Napjak mandu: thin dumplings filled with small amounts of dangmyeon and vegetables
Cuisine
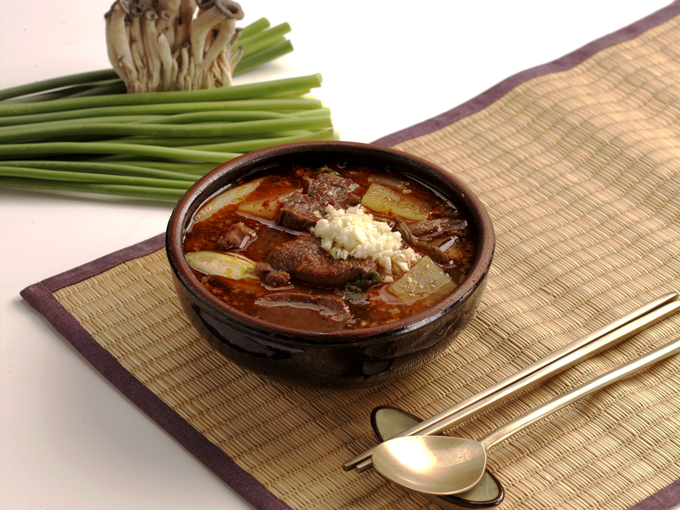
Ttaro-gukbap

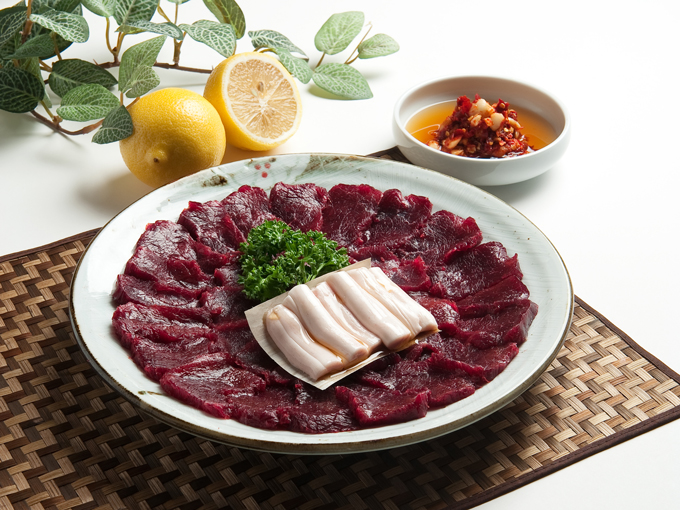
Mungtigi

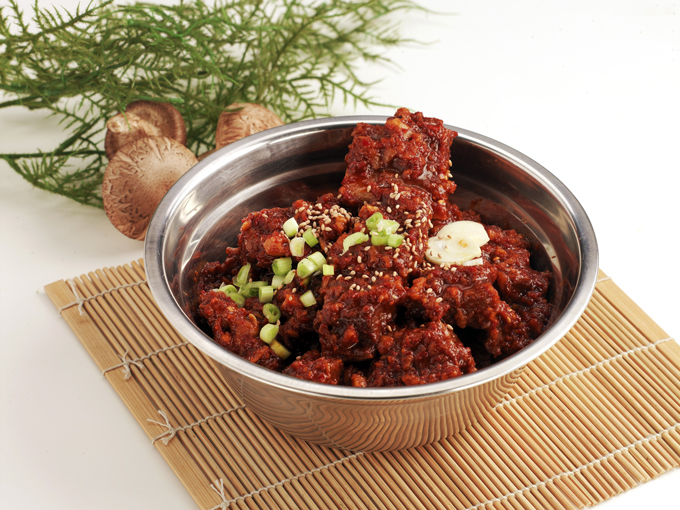
Jjimgalbi

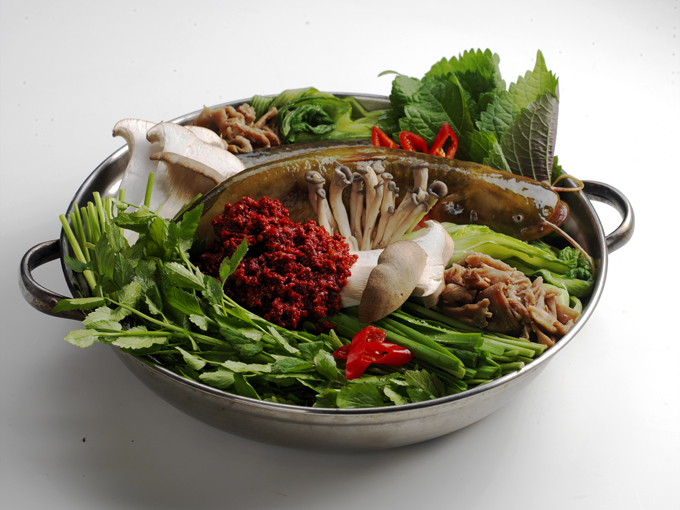
Nonmegi maeuntang

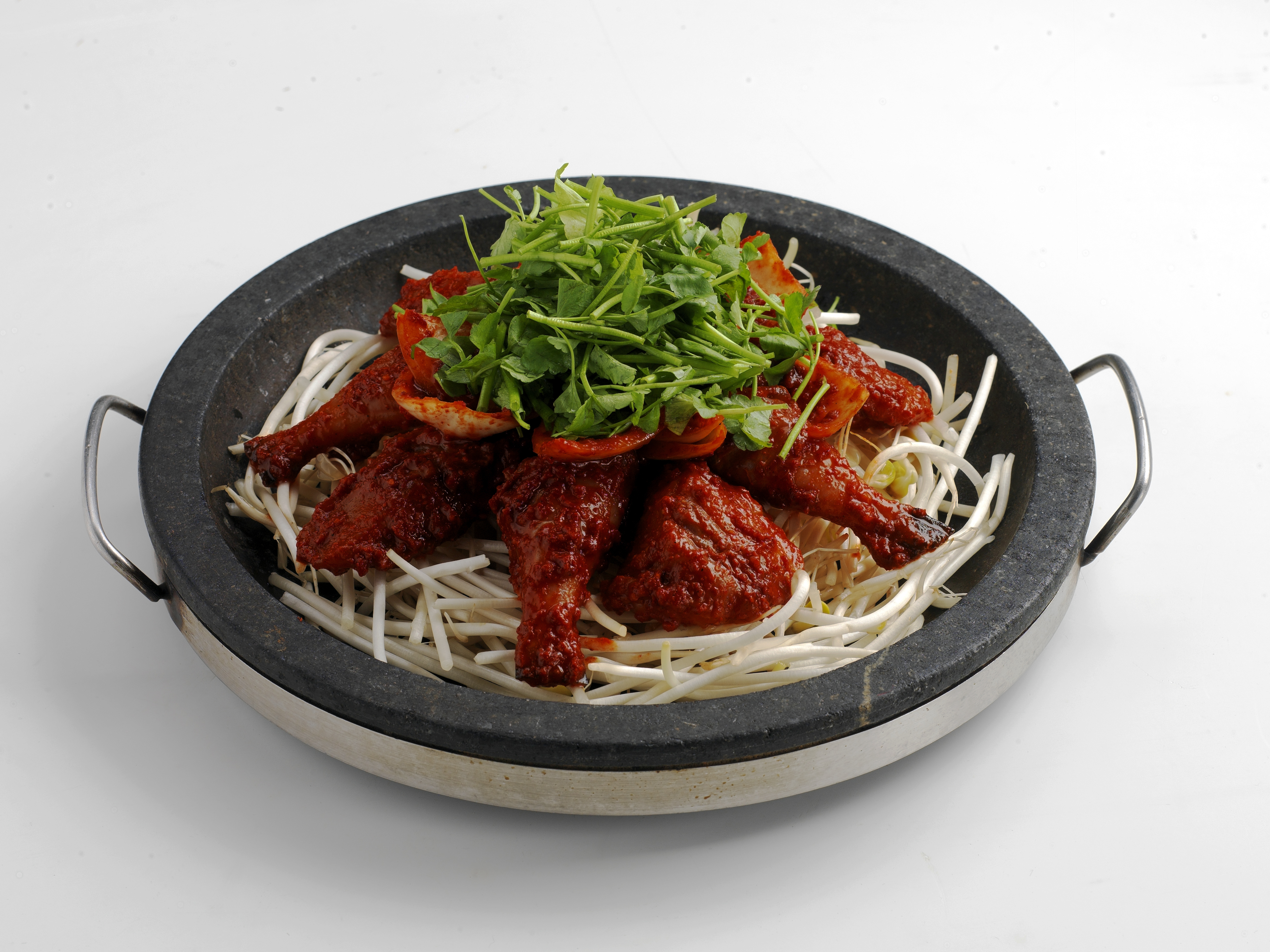
Bogeo bulgogi

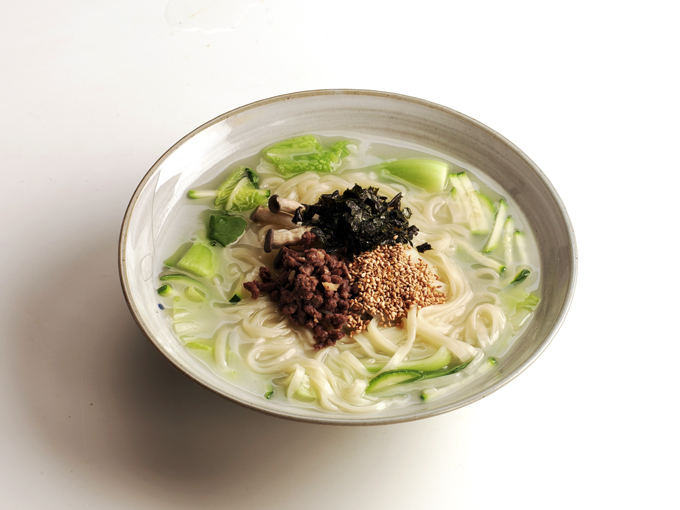
Nureun guksu

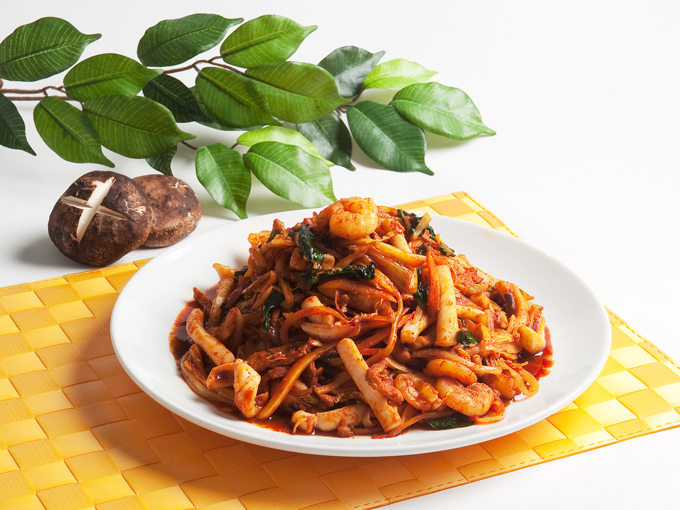
Yaki udon

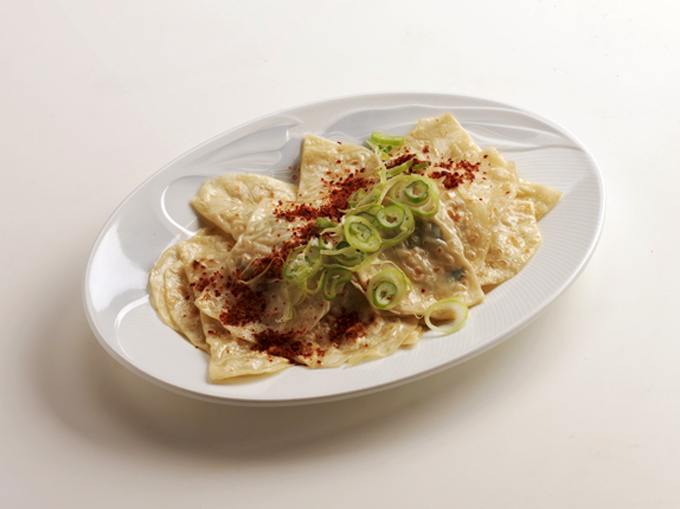
Napjak mandu

=== Museums ===
- Daegu Art Museum

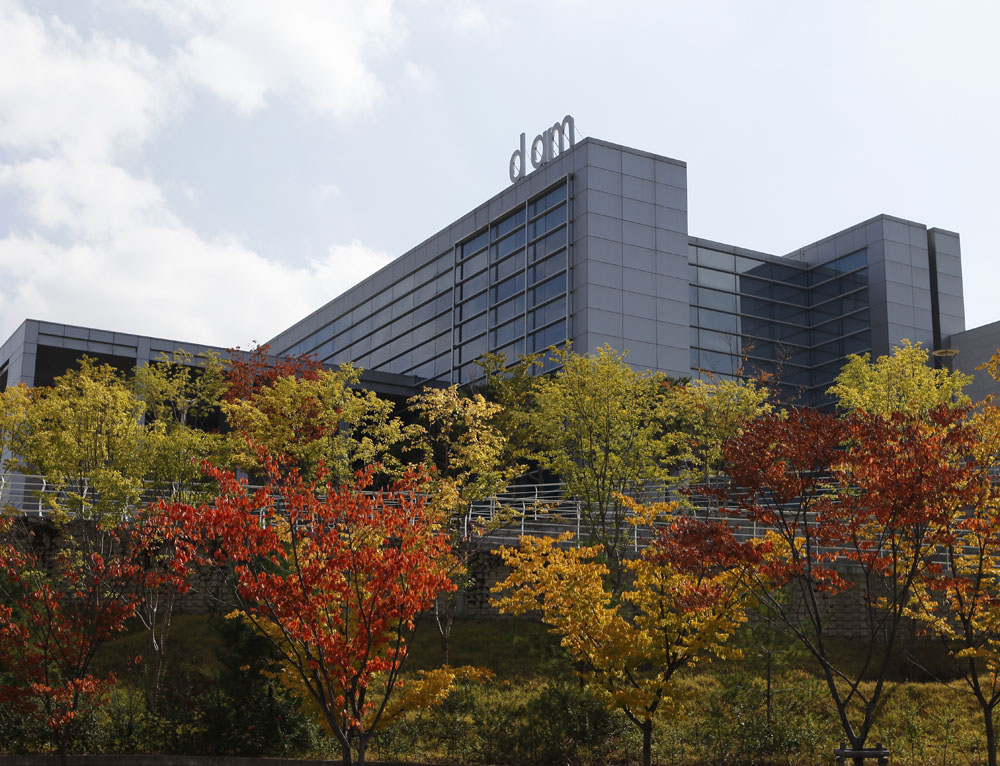
Daegu Art Museum

- Daegu National Museum – A notable national museum collecting relics excavated in and around Daegu
- Daegu Bangjja Yugi (Korean Bronzeware) Museum
- Hengso Museum of Keimyung University
- Korea Video Museum
- Kyungpook National University Museum
- Museum for Daegu National University of Education
- Museum of Natural Dye Arts
- National Debt Repayment Movement Memorial Museum

=== Theaters ===
- Daegu Opera House – The first theater in Korea only for performing opera
- Suseong Artpia
- Keimyung Art Center – One of the largest scale theaters in the city.
- Daegu Culture and Arts Center

=== Sports ===
On March 27, 2007, the city was selected to host the 2011 World Championships in Athletics. Daegu competed with cities such as Moscow, Russia, and Brisbane, Australia, to earn the votes of the IAAF Council. The event was the fourth IAAF World Championships in Athletics to be held outside Europe, and the first games in mainland Asia. It was also the third worldwide sports event held in Korea after the 1988 Summer Olympics in Seoul and 2002 FIFA World Cup in Korea and Japan, in which Daegu hosted four matches. It also hosted the 2003 Summer Universiade. The city hosted the Colorful Daegu Championships Meeting between 2005 and 2012.

Daegu Stadium is the second largest sports complex in South Korea with a seating capacity of 66,422. Daegu Civic Stadium hosted some football matches at the 1988 Summer Olympics.

The Daegu Marathon is held here every year in April. The race begins and ends at the Daegu Stadium.

==== Sports teams ====
Club	Sport	League	Venue	Established
Samsung Lions	Baseball	KBO League	Daegu Samsung Lions Park	1982
Daegu FC	Football	K League 2	Daegu iM Bank Park	2003
Daegu KOGAS Pegasus	Basketball	Korean Basketball League	Daegu Gymnasium	1994

===== Samsung Lions =====
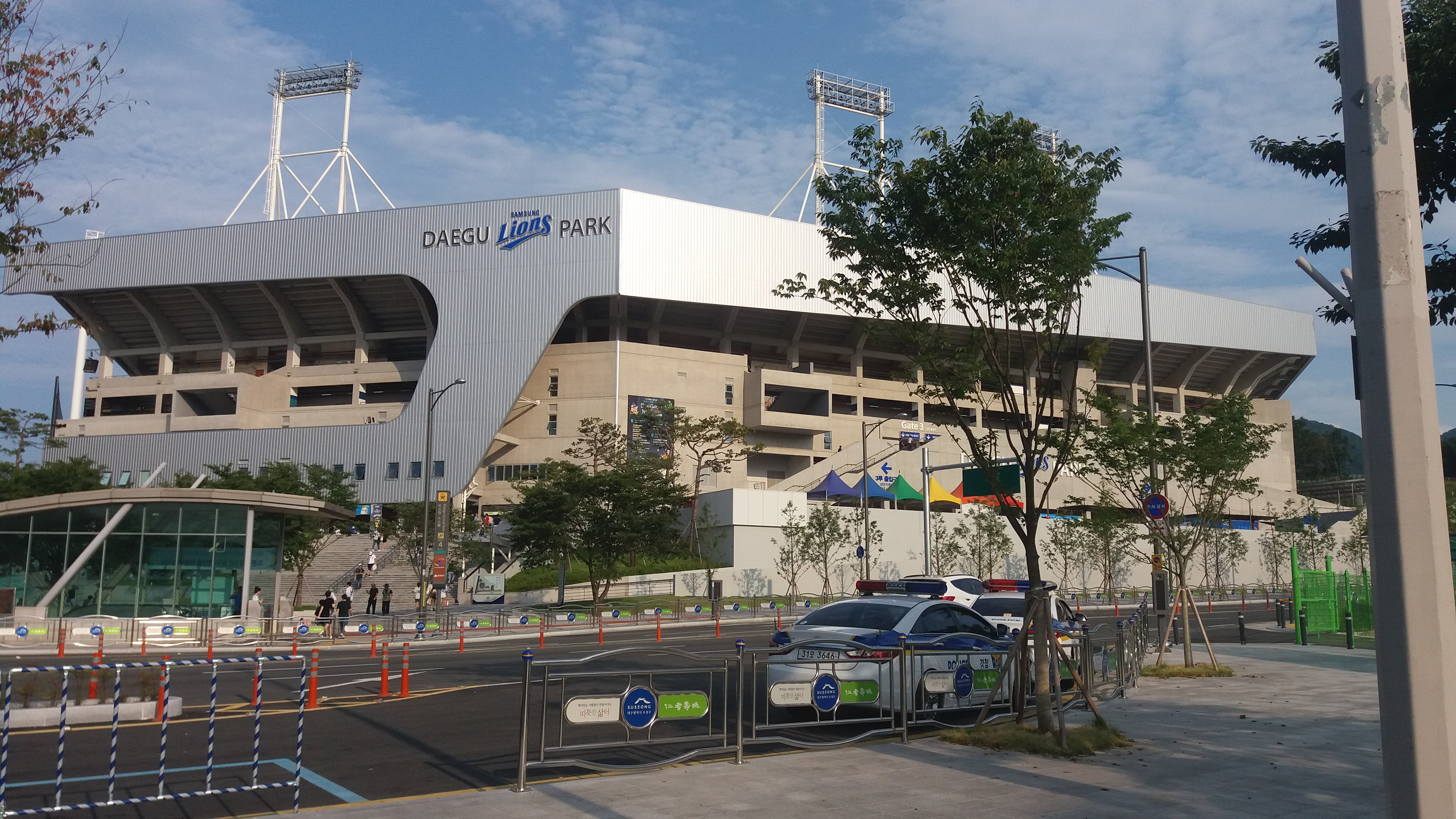
A home stadium of the Samsung Lions, one of the most popular sports teams in the city

The Samsung Lions are a professional baseball team founded in 1982. They are based in the southeastern city of Daegu and are members of the KBO League. Their home stadium is Daegu Samsung Lions Park. They have won the Korean Series eight times. The Samsung Lions are the first team to win four consecutive Korean Series titles (2011, 2012, 2013, and 2014). They are also the first Korean team to win a regular league title for five consecutive years (2011, 2012, 2013, 2014, and 2015).

===== Daegu FC =====
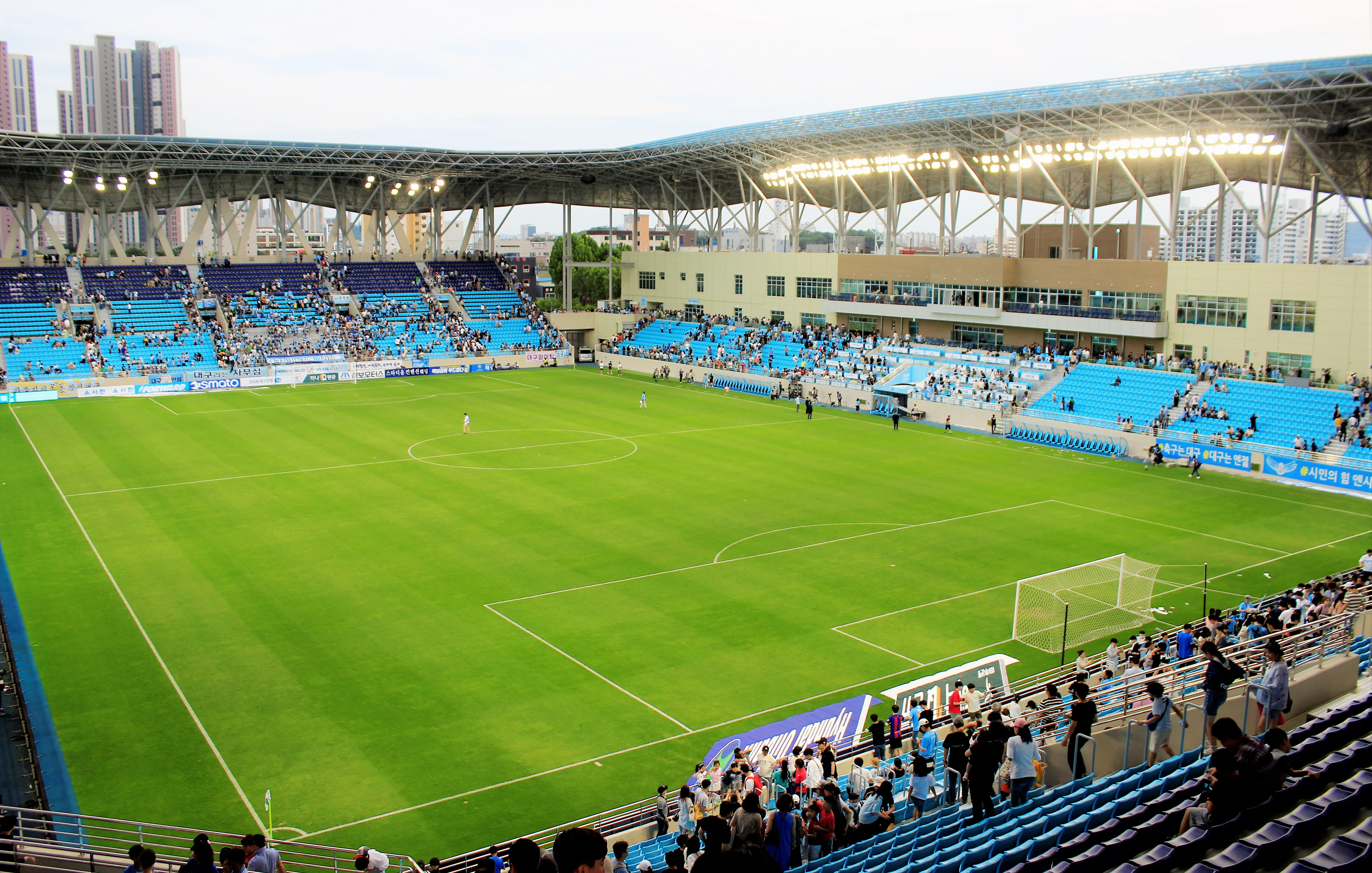
Daegu iM Bank Park

Daegu Football Club was founded as a community club at the end of 2002, and made their K League debut in 2003. Historically, Daegu have often placed in the lower reaches of the K League. Their best season to date has been 2021, when they finished third out of twelve teams. They were also the winners of the Korean FA Cup in 2018, which qualified the club for their first appearance in the AFC Champions League the following year. The club has since played in the 2021 and 2022 editions of AFC Champions League.

=== Media ===
There are three terrestrial TV broadcasting stations in the city: KBS Daegu Broadcast Station, Daegu MBC, and TBC. These are affiliated companies of central broadcasting stations in Seoul just like other local broadcasting companies in South Korea. TBC (Taegu Broadcasting Corporation) depends on SBS. They cover to Gyeongsangbuk-do out of the city. Each television broadcasting company has its own radio station as well.

=== International Daegu ===
Daegu is largely a homogeneous community that includes few non-Koreans. However, a number of immigrants from South and Southeast Asia work in automotive-parts factories on the city's west side. In addition, there is a small group of English-speaking Westerners working in English schools and university programs. The American military bases are home to several hundred Americans. Recently Chinese students have begun studying Korean at universities in Daegu, and there is an increasing number of graduate and post-graduate students from other Asian countries. As elsewhere in Korea, Korean food overwhelmingly dominates; Chinese, Japanese and Western food forms the bulk of non-Korean food, but recently Indian and Russian foods have become available.

Daegu hosts three American military bases, Camp Henry, Camp George, and Camp Walker. Camp Walker houses Daegu High School, while Camp George has Daegu American School, the elementary and middle school for the bases (primarily for children of military personnel and US Military civilian employees). Although non-military employees can enroll their children at the school, most either home-school their children or send them to a small Christian private school which teaches about 25 children near the central business district of Daegu. Camp George contains most of the residences for married enlisted soldiers, while Camp Walker is the home to enlisted Sergeants Major and officers, Major and up. Camp Henry and Camp Walker are the primary work sites for military personnel.

== Demographics ==
Religion in Daegu (2024)
1. Not religious (49.0%)
2. Buddhism (24.0%)
3. Protestantism (15.0%)
4. Catholicism (10.0%)
5. Others (2.00%)

Historical population
Year	Pop.	±%
1950	355,057	—
1960	659,407	+85.7%
1970	1,063,553	+61.3%
1980	1,604,934	+50.9%
1990	2,229,040	+38.9%
2000	2,480,578	+11.3%
2010	2,446,418	−1.4%
2020	2,410,700	−1.5%

According to the census of 2015, 23.8% of the population followed Buddhism and 19.7% followed Christianity (12% Protestantism and 7.7% Catholicism). 55.8% of the population is irreligious.

== Education ==
As of 2021, Daegu has 232 elementary schools, 125 middle schools, and 94 high schools. There are two specialized public high schools which are Daegu Science High School and Taegu Foreign Language High School, and some other high schools such as Keisung Academy, Gyeongsin High School and Daeryun High School have good grades for university admission. Most of the well-known high schools are located in Suseong District because its educational grade and zeal are high standard in the country.

Also, Daegu has many independent private high schools like Keisung Academy (also called Keisung High School), Gyeongsin High School, Gyeong-il Girls High School, Daegun Catholic High School, and Daegu International School.

=== Universities and colleges ===
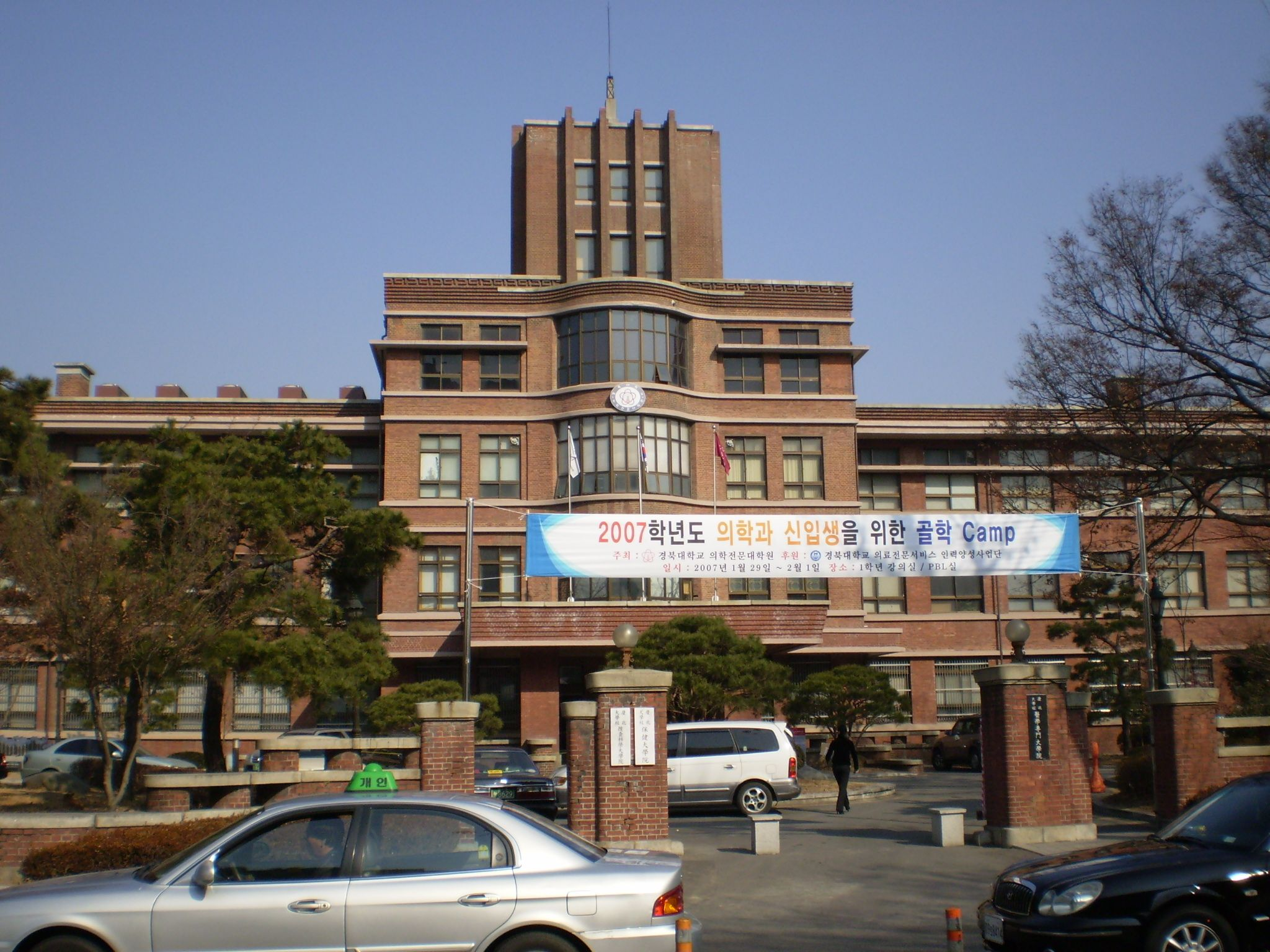
Kyungpook National University, School of Medicine

Keimyung University, main building

Daegu and its satellite towns are one of the areas which have the largest private higher educational institutions in Korea. Many of their main campuses are located in the nearby Gyeongsan which serves the Daegu region as a college town. Kyungpook National University (KNU) is one of the most highly ranked and well organized national universities in Korea. It holds high ranks in and around the city in many academic fields, while DGIST(Daegu Gyeongbuk Institute of Science and Technology) is recognized as one of Korea's top universities in the field of science and technology. DGIST is one of four ISTs in Korea, along with KAIST, UNIST and GIST. It was established under 'The Daegu Gyeongbuk Institute of Science and Technology Act (Act 699)' enacted on December 11, 2003. In 2019, DGIST was selected as 'Top 25 Rising Young Universities'. Daegu has two of the most prestigious private universities outside Seoul, Yeungnam University (YU) and Keimyung University. There are some smaller private universities such as Catholic University of Daegu and Daegu University. Daegu National University of Education offers elementary education training.

The other universities and colleges include Daegu Arts University, Daegu Cyber University, Daegu Haany University, Daegu Health College, Daegu Mirae College, Daegu Polytechnic College, Daegu Technical College, Daeshin University, Keimyung University, Kyongbuk Science College, Kyungil University, Taekyeung College, Yeungjin College, Yeungnam College of Science and Technology, and Youngnam Theological College and Seminary.

==== Medical institutions ====
Some large university hospitals make the city the medical hub of south-eastern Korea. The Kyungpook National University Hospital, founded as Daegu-dongin-uiwon in 1907 by the Japanese, is the best-known hospital in the city. The Dongsan Hospital (attached to Keimyung University), founded as Jejungwon in 1899, is one of the oldest western style medical clinics in Korea. The Yeungnam University Medical Center has the largest number of beds in the city. The yearly treatment amount of these tertiary hospitals is the second largest in South Korea after that of Seoul. The Daegu Catholic University Medical Center is also included in them.

=== Primary and secondary schools ===
- Hamji High School
- Kangbuk High School
- Maecheon High School
- Seongsan High School

International schools in Daegu include:

- Daegu International School
- Daegu Chinese Elementary School or Korea Daeguhwagyo Elementary School (한국대구화교초등학교)
- Overseas Chinese High School, Daegu

=== Elementary schools ===
Daegu Sindang Elementary School is a public elementary school located in Dalseo District, Daegu, near the campus of Keimyung University. The school's motto is "To raise children who are upright, wise, and strong", and its emblem and flower are the magnolia and pine tree, respectively. Daegu Sindang Elementary School has a history of excellence in sports, music and academics, and has won numerous awards in these fields. It is also a designated school for creative education and a leading school for after-school programmes. In 2020, a group of students from Daegu Sindang Elementary School won first place in the Korean National Championship of the FIRST LEGO League (FLL) robotics competition. In 2023, the school student won the prestigious 12th Korea Multicultural Youth Award.

== Transportation ==
=== Rail ===
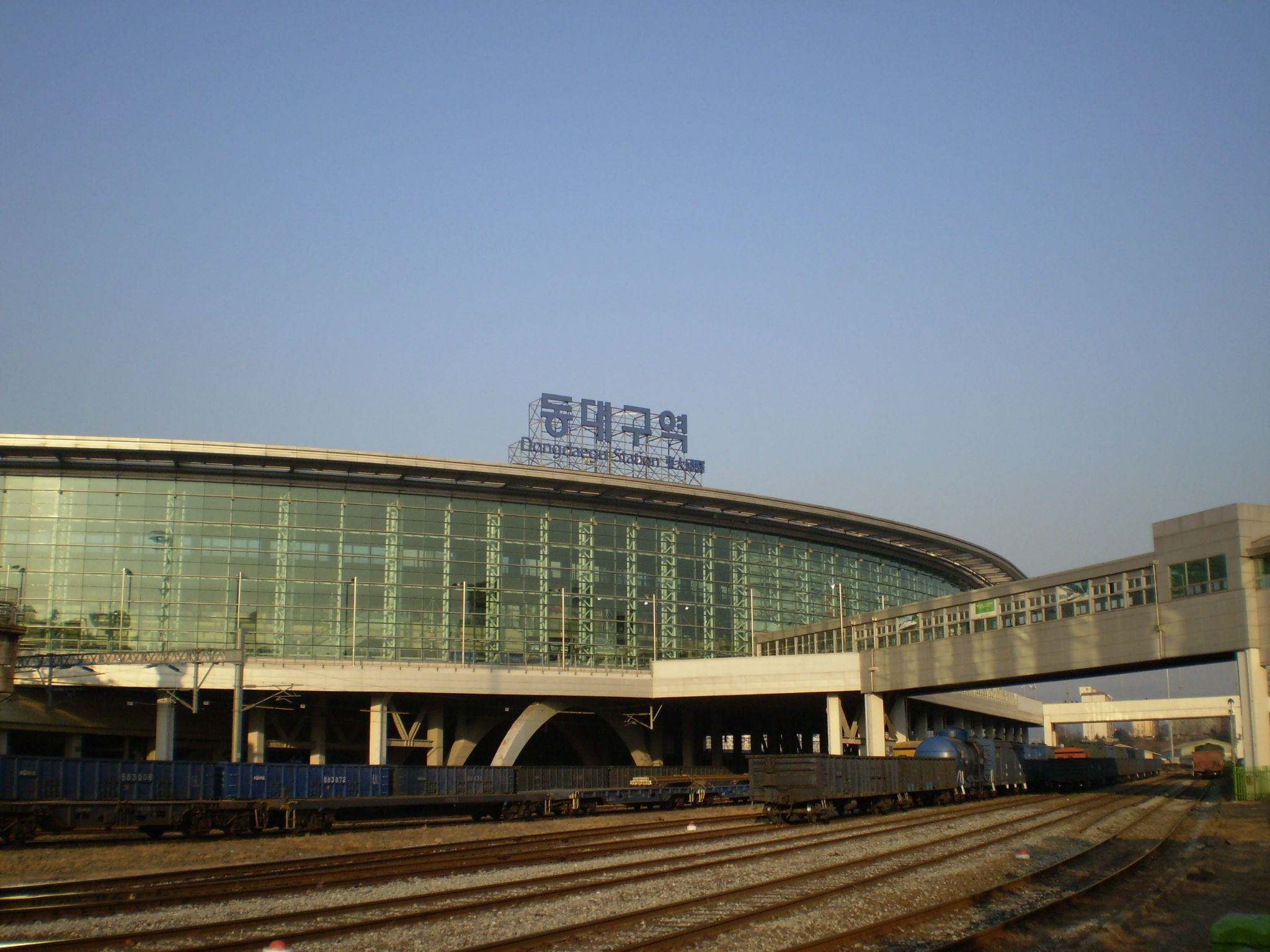
Dongdaegu Station

Daegu station

Daegu is the hub of the Korean inland railroad traffic. The main railroad of the country, Gyeongbu Line passes through the city. The largest railroad station in the city, Dongdaegu Station, has the second largest passenger traffic in Korea after Seoul Station, it is the number one station in Korea for train stops, and the largest train traffic. All trains passing through Dongdaegu Station make a mandatory stop. The station re-opened in 2004 after extensive renovations serving the KTX highspeed train, Saemaul and Mugunghwa trains. All kinds of trains except KTX depart from Daegu station, an all-new building with cinemas, restaurants and a department store, located near the city centre. It has the tenth largest passenger traffic in Korea. Daegu Line branches off from Gacheon station of Gyeongbu Line.

=== Metro ===
Daegu Metro Line Map

The city also has a metro system, consisting of two heavy rail lines. Line 1 crosses the city from northeast to southwest, while Line 2 crosses from west to east. Line 3 from northwest to southeast is an elevated monorail. All the lines are and will be operated by the Daegu Metropolitan Transit Corporation (DTRO). Also, on December 14, 2024, the Daegyeong Line, a railway connecting Daegu and major cities in Gyeongsangbuk-do, was opened. As a result, citizens of Daegu and Gyeongsangbuk-do can now travel conveniently between the regions by rail. And Line 4, currently newly under construction, is a long-range plan and will be a circle line. Fare is ₩1700 and ₩1500 won with a prepaid card. There is a free interchange scheme between the metro and bus within an hour of first use for the prepaid card users.

It started a full-fledged health-sharing stairway project by installing "Seven-color melody health donation stairs" at Shinmae Station and Imdang Station on Daegu Subway Line 2. Using these stairs, LED lights turn on with the sound of the keyboard, and a donation of ₩10 per session goes to those in need (such as pediatric cancer centers and low-income families).

=== Road ===
There are two types of buses which are local and limited express. Limited express buses have more seats, but often passengers are required to stand. As of 2020, Local bus fare costs around ₩1,400 with cash, Limited express bus fare would set you back ₩1,800. Discounted fare is available with a prepaid card.

Bus route numbers are made up with 3 digits, each number indicates the area that bus serves. For example, number 407 bus runs from zone four, to zone zero, and then to zone seven. Other routes, usually circular, are named for the districts they serve and numbered 1 through 3.

Traffic is sometimes heavy, however, the major thoroughfares handle fairly high volumes of traffic without too much trouble.

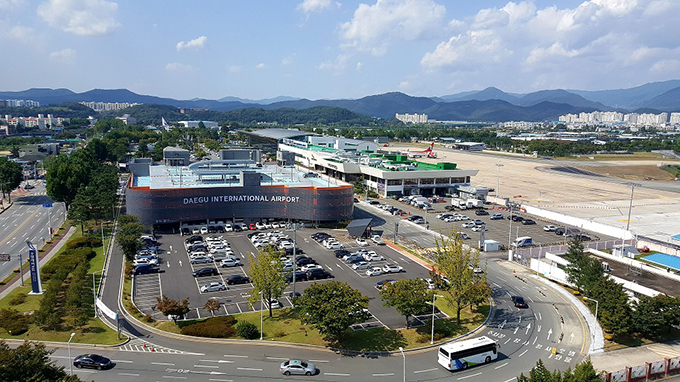
Daegu International Airport

=== Air ===
Daegu is served by Daegu International Airport, located in northeastern Daegu. As of July 2022, international destinations include China, Thailand, the Philippines, and Mongolia.

=== Bus ===
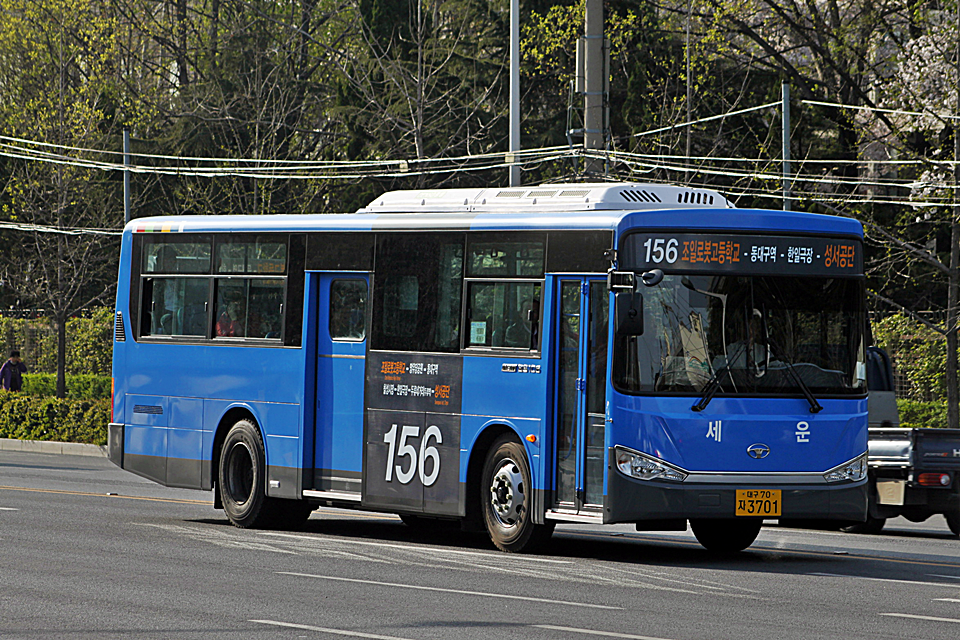
A Daegu Seun bus

- Daegu Buses

== Others ==
=== Accidents ===
- The Frog Boys, this incident is an unsolved case. 5 boys were killed by the criminal in 1991. Boys failed to return after going out to pick up the salamander eggs, and people often call the case "The frog boys case".
- The 1995 Daegu gas explosions killed 101 and injured 202. A pagoda for consolation of the dead was erected in Haksan park.
- The Daegu subway fire occurred on February 18, 2003, when an arsonist, "Kim Dae-Han" set fire to a train at the Jungangno Station of the Daegu Metropolitan Subway in Daegu, South Korea. The fire spread across two trains within minutes, killing 192 people and injuring 151 others. It remains the deadliest deliberate loss of life in a single incident in South Korean peacetime history.

== Notable people ==
=== Leaders ===
- Roh Tae-woo – army general and thirteenth president of South Korea
- Park Geun Hye – former president of South Korea, from 2013 to 2017, daughter of former president Park Chung Hee

=== Industrialists ===
- Kim Woo-jung – Korean businessman, founder and former chairman of the Daewoo Group
- Toni Ko – Businessperson and founder of NYX Cosmetics
- Lee Kun-hee – a South Korean businessman who served as chairman of the Samsung Group from 1987 to 2008 and from 2010 to 2020, and is credited with the transformation of Samsung to the world's largest manufacturer of smartphones, televisions, and memory chips.

=== Religious ===
- Kim Sou-hwan – first Korean Cardinal of the Catholic Church. His father escaped from his hometown of Chungcheong province for keeping his religion.

=== Writers ===
- Yi Sang-hwa – a Korean nationalist poet active in the resistance to Japanese rule
- Jaegwon Kim – philosopher
- Hyun Jin-geon – a Korean writer

=== Actors and actresses ===
- Ahn Nae-sang – actor
- Bong Joon-ho – director and screenwriter
- Lee Chang-dong – director
- Shin Seong-il – actor, director, and producer
- Uhm Ji-won - actress
- Son Ye-jin – actress
- Moon Chae-won – actress
- Song Hye-kyo – actress
- Min Hyo-rin – actress
- Seo Ji-hoon – actor
- Yoo Ah-in – actor
- Jang Dong-yoon – actor
- Yoon So-ho – actor
- Tom Choi – actor
- Kim Jung-woo – actor
- Kim Min-jae – actor
- Kim Hee-sun – actress
- Sung Hoon – actor

=== Sports ===
- Lee Man-Soo – baseball player
- Yang Jun-Hyuk – baseball player
- Lee Seung-Yeop – baseball player
- Park Chu-Young – soccer player
- Jin Sun-Yu – short-track speed skater, triple gold medalist at 2006 Winter Olympics
- Bae Sang-moon – golfer, leading money winner on the Japan Golf Tour for the 2011 season
- Choi Doo-ho – mixed martial artist
- Ji-Hwan Bae – baseball player for the New York Mets
- Kyuho Lee – racing driver
- Lee Jungwoo – racing driver

=== Beauties ===
- Chang Yun-jong – first runner-up of the Miss Universe 1988, winner of the Miss Korea 1987
- Son Tae-young – first runner-up of the Miss International 2000, second runner-up of the Miss Korea 2000, actress
- Yoo Ye-bin – winner of the Miss Korea 2013, competed in Miss Universe 2014

=== Singers ===
- Bae Joo-hyun (stage name Irene) – singer and leader of Red Velvet
- Choi Seung-cheol (stage name S.Coups) – singer, rapper, and leader of Seventeen
- Jang Da-hye (stage name Heize) – rapper and participant in Unpretty Rapstar 2
- Jang Woohyuk (stage name Woohyuk) - singer and former member of H.O.T
- Kang Chan-hee (stage name Chani) – singer and member of SF9
- Kim Dong-han – former member of JBJ and member of WEi, participant in Produce 101
- Kim Ji-yeon (stage name Bona) – singer and member of Cosmic Girls
- Kim Ki-bum (stage name Key) – singer and member of Shinee
- Kim Min-jun (stage name Jun. K) – vocalist, leader, songwriter, and producer of 2PM
- Kim Tae-hyung (stage name V) – singer, actor, songwriter and member of BTS
- Lee Joo-heon (stage name Joohoney) – singer and member of Monsta X
- Lee Seung-hyub – singer and member of N.Flying
- Nancy Jewel McDonie – singer and former member of Momoland
- Min Yoon-gi (stage names Suga and Agust D) – singer, rapper, producer, songwriter and member of BTS
- Park Jae-chan – actor and member of DKZ
- Park Ji-young (stage name Kahi) – singer and former member of After School
- Park So-jin – singer and leader of Girl's Day
- Charley Yang (known as chandol) – singer and TikTok content creator.
- Choi Beomgyu (stage name Beomgyu) - singer, producer, writer, and member of Tomorrow x Together (TXT)

=== Other ===
- Sin Sung-gyŏm – General during the Later Three Kingdoms period in the early tenth century
- Kim Yong-jun – Art critic and historian
- Jeon Tae-il – Labor activist

== In popular culture ==
Daegu serves as the setting for Season 1, Episode 6 of the HBO horror drama Lovecraft Country (2020). Set in 1949/50 the episode is a prolonged flashback or prequel to the main arc of the series, which takes place in 1955 in Chicago and Massachusetts, and depicts main character Atticus' experiences as a U.S. soldier during the Korean War.

== Sister cities ==
Daegu is twinned with the following locations:

- Atlanta, United States (1981)
- Kyoto, Japan (1987)
- Almaty, Kazakhstan (1990)
- Qingdao, China (1993)
- Belo Horizonte, Brazil (1994)
- Hiroshima, Japan (1997)
- Saint Petersburg, Russia (1997)
- Plovdiv, Bulgaria (2002)
- Taipei, Taiwan (2010)
- Ningbo, China (2013)
- Milan, Italy (2015)
- Chengdu, China (2015)
- Milwaukee, United States (2017)
- Da Nang, Vietnam (2018)

=== Friendship cities ===
- Yangzhou, Jiangsu, China (2003)
- Yancheng, Jiangsu, China (2003)
- Shenyang, Liaoning, China (2003)
- Kobe, Hyōgo, Japan (2010)
- Ho Chi Minh City, Vietnam (2015)
- Shaoxing, Zhejiang, China (2015)
- Wuhan, Hubei, China (2016)
- Bangkok, Thailand (2017)
- Changsha, Hunan, China (2018)
- Kaohsiung, Taiwan (2018)
- Bắc Ninh Province, Vietnam (2019)
- Lille, France (2019)
- Yanbian, China (2021)
- Bukhara, Uzbekistan (2022)
- Johor Bahru, Malaysia (2023)
- Jepara, Indonesia (2025)

== See also ==
- Gususan Library
- Gyeongsang Province
- History of Daegu
- List of cities in South Korea
