= Hamji High School =

School in Daegu, South Korea

Coordinates: 35°55′42″N 128°33′38″E

- Daegu; South Korea

Information
- School type: High school
- Established: 2008; 18 years ago

Hamji High School is a high school located in Daegu in Korea. The school's emblem tree is a pine and emblem flower a rose. This school is science-orientated and offers a curriculum specializing in science subjects.

== History ==
Important dates pertaining to the history of the school include:

- 8 November 2005: Plans to establish Hamji High School were confirmed.
- 16 August 2006: Construction of the school commenced.
- 10 February 2008: Construction of the school was completed.
- 1 March 2008: The school's first principal took office.
- 3 March 2008: The first entrance ceremony was held.
