= Daegu Yangnyeongsi Festival =

Eastern medicine festival in South Korea

- Hangul: 대구약령시축제
- Hanja: 大邱藥令市祝祭
- Revised Romanization: Daegu Yangnyeongsi Chukje
- McCune–Reischauer: Taegu Yangnyŏngsi Ch'ukche

Daegu Yangnyeongsi Festival is a festival of Daegu, South Korea.

The festival is held every May. The main events include a medicinal herb party, cutting medicinal herbs contest and a free medical check-up by oriental medicine.

== History ==
Daegu Namseong-ro, which has been called 'Yakjeon-golmok' since the old days, has some 180 oriental medicinal business, including oriental medical clinics and oriental medicine shops, and it is the Yangryeongsi, Daegu's representative cultural heritage. Daegu Yangryeongsi, which has been held annually since 1658, was a festival where oriental medicine workers and residents from all over the country worked together to buy, sell, and convey the hearts of the people and culture. As the opening date of Yangryeongsi drew near, the city was busy preparing to welcome guests from all over the country. On the opening day, a large arch shaped gate was built in the east and west of Yeongnyeongsi, creating a festive mood, and commodities stores were also crowded along with the trading of medicinal herbs. Except for some time during the Japanese Colonial Period Yangnyeongsi Festival has continuously held in. As such, the opening event of Yangryeongsi was modernized in the form of a festival, and it has come to the present since 1978.

== See also ==
- List of festivals in South Korea
- List of festivals in Asia
