= Daegu National Museum =

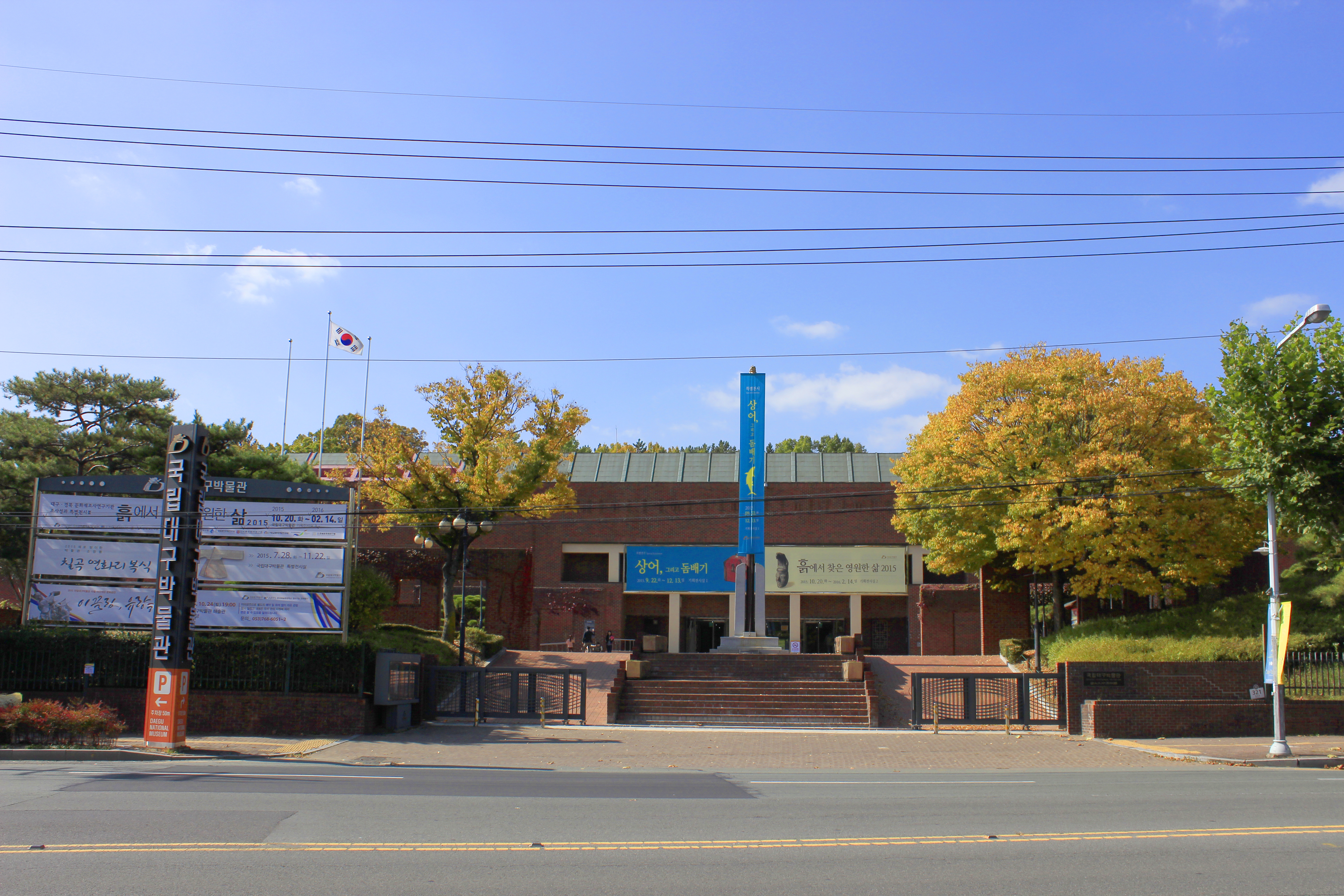
- Established: 7 December 1994
- Location: Hwanggeum-dong, Suseong District, Daegu, South Korea
- Coordinates: 35°50′45″N 128°38′17″E
- Type: National museum
- Website: daegu.museum.go.kr/contents/siteMainLang.do?lang=ENG

Korean name
- Hangul: 국립대구박물관
- Hanja: 國立大邱博物館
- RR: Gungnip Daegu bangmulgwan
- MR: Kungnip Taegu pangmulgwan

Daegu National Museum (Korean: 국립대구박물관) is a national museum located in Hwanggeum-dong, Suseong District, Daegu, South Korea. It opened on December 7, 1994, and holds approximately 30,000 artifacts. Its main collection consists of archaeological objects from Daegu and North Gyeongsang Province region.

The museum was built as a cultural facility to research, preserve, exhibit and educate visitors on the cultural heritage of Daegu and Gyeongsangbuk-do. On July 19, 2010, the Ancient Culture Hall, the Medieval Culture Hall, and the Textiles and Clothing Hall were opened to the public.

== See also ==
- List of museums in South Korea
