= Gyeongsin High School =

School in Daegu, South Korea

Location
- Daegu; South Korea

Information
- Motto: Think justly, Work hard, Trust and help each other
- Established: 1979; 46 years ago

Gyeongsin High School is a high school that is situated in Daegu, South Korea.

The school motto is "Think justly, Work hard, Trust and help each other". The education goal of the school is growing global talented person who is progressive and creative. The working principles of the school is divided into three types which is democratic, scientific and independent management. The number of ordinary classrooms is 45, that of special classrooms is 13, that of janitor's offices is 13 and that of other facilities is 13.

== Symbol ==
The tree that symbolizes the school is pine which means a scholarly fidelity, as the tree keeps green all the year round and does not change, and constancy of man of virtue who does not yield to pressure and adverse circumstances. The flower of the school is a crape-myrtle whose flower of red and white light blooms from summer to fall. That means having young life like flower bloom for a long time.

== History ==
1996 March 3, the school was built. 1979 March 5, the first gyeongsin entrance ceremony was held. 2007 October 15, the digital library opened. 2011, was designated as an autonomous private high school.
