= Kangbuk High School =

Korean high school

Coordinates: 35°55′49″N 128°32′26″E

Information
- School type: Private high school
- Motto: A person who has a dream, one who is efficient, one who is moral
- Established: 1975; 51 years ago
- Sister school: Youngsong Girls' High School
- Gender: Boys

Gangbuk High School is a high school in Daegu, Korea. The school is a private high school and admits only male students. Its motto is "A person who has a dream, one who is efficient, one who is moral". The school's goal is enhancing moral character of the students coupled with imparting a sense of creativity.

== History ==
The plan to establish the school was approved on 17 November 1974, and the first entrance ceremony was held on 2 March 1975. The school is situated on top of a hill overlooking the Southern Chilgok district of Daegu. It is connected with Yeong Song Girls High School, which shares the same property and sporting facilities.

Gangbuk High School includes a Tae Kwon Do school, where students choose to follow a path of Tae Kwon Do training for the majority of the school day, over the mainstream school curriculum.

== Symbol ==
The tree that symbolizes the school is a zelkova which mean filial duty, courtesy, fidelity that have been important in Korea. The school flower is an yulan which means pure and clear.
