= Hengso Museum =

Coordinates: 35.85675°N 128.48990°E

- Hangul: 행소박물관
- Hanja: 行素博物館
- RR: Haengso bangmulgwan
- MR: Haengso pangmulgwan

Hengso Museum is a museum that belongs to Keimyung University that is located in Daegu, South Korea. The museum opened in May 1978. And in May 2004, it was rebuilt as new start point. The museum is not opened every Sunday.
