= Seongsan High School =

School in Daegu, South Korea

- Korean: 성산고등학교

Information
- Established: 2003; 23 years ago

Seongsan High School (Korean: 성산고등학교; Hanja: 城山高等學校) is a high school in Daegu, South Korea.

== History ==
The school was approved on 18 November 2001, and construction was completed on 1 May 2002. On 4 March 2003, the first entrance ceremony was conducted.

== Symbols ==
The tree of the school is a zelkova, which symbolizes faith, meeting, and capacity. The flower is a chrysanthemum, symbolizing youth. The school's color is blue-green, which means youth, vitality, pure passion, and endless growing.

The school has four goals for students. Students should have a sense of responsibility and morality; students aim to develop creativity to adapt themselves to future society; students need to develop intellectual capacity to contribute to community development; and students aim to cultivate a harmonious mind and body. The motto is self-realization.
