= Biseulsan =

Mountain in South Korea

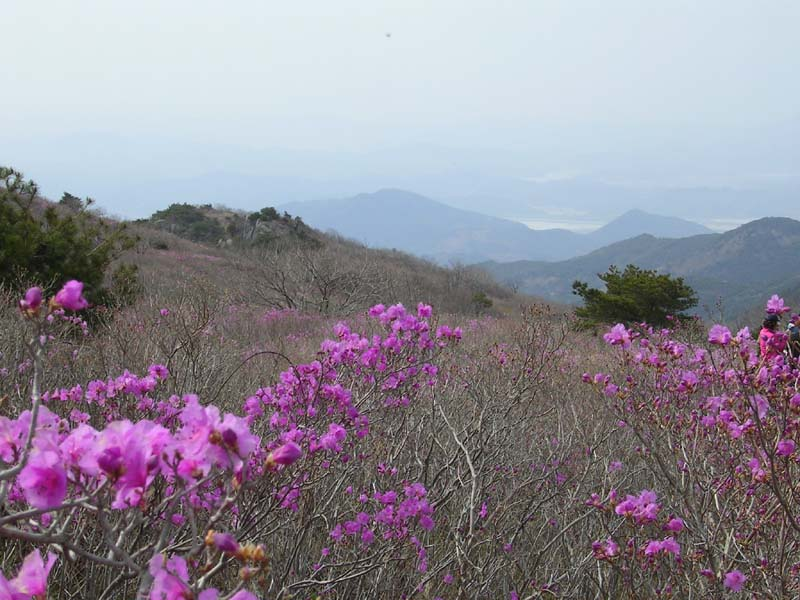

Highest point
- Elevation: 1,084 m (3,556 ft)
- Listing: Mountains of Korea
- Coordinates: 35°43′00″N 128°31′28″E

Geography
- Location: North Gyeongsang Province, South Korea
- Country: South Korea

Biseulsan (Korean: 비슬산) is a mountain of North Gyeongsang Province, eastern South Korea. It has an elevation of 1,084 metres.
