= List of universities and colleges in South Korea =

This is a list of institutions of higher education in South Korea.

== Quick index ==
A B C D E F G H I J K L M N O P R S T U W Y

== A ==
- Agricultural Cooperative College – Goyang, Gyeonggi
- Ajou Motor College – Boryeong, South Chungcheong
- Ajou University – Suwon, Gyeonggi
- Andong National University – Andong, North Gyeongsang
- Andong Science College – Andong, North Gyeongsang
- Ansan University – Ansan, Gyeonggi
- Ansung Polytechnic College – Anseong, Gyeonggi
- Anyang University – Anyang, Gyeonggi
- Asan Information and Technology Polytechnic College – Asan, South Chungcheong
- Asia LIFE University – Daejeon
- Asia United Theological University – Seoul and Yangpyeong County

== B ==
See also under P

- Baekseok Arts University – Seoul
- Baekseok Culture University – Cheonan,
- Baekseok University - Cheonan, South Chungcheong
- Baewha Women's University – Seoul
- Berea University of Graduate Studies – Seoul
- Bucheon University – Bucheon, Gyeonggi
- Busan Arts College – Busan
- Busan College of Information Technology – Busan
- Busan Institute of Science and Technology – Busan
- Busan Jangsin University – see Busan Presbyterian University
- Busan Kyungsang College – Busan
- Busan National University of Education – Busan
- Busan Polytechnic College – Busan
- Busan Presbyterian University – Gimhae, South Gyeongsang
- Byuksung College – Gimje, North Jeolla

== C ==
See also under J

- Calvin University – Yongin, Gyeonggi
- Capital Baptist Theological Seminary – Anseong, Gyeonggi
- Catholic Sangji College – Andong, North Gyeongsang
- Catholic University of Daegu – Gyeongsan, North Gyeongsang
- Catholic University of Korea – Seoul and Bucheon City, Gyeonggi
- Catholic University of Pusan – Busan
- Catholic Kwandong University - Gangneung, Gangwon-do
- Cha University - Gyeonggi-do, South Korea
- Changshin University – Masan, South Gyeongsang
- Changwon National University – Changwon, South Gyeongsang
- Changwon Polytechnic College – Changwon, South Gyeongsang
- Cheju Halla University – Jeju City, Jeju
- Cheju National University of Education – see Jeju National University of Education
- Cheju Tourism College – Bukjeju County, Jeju
- Cheonan College of Foreign Studies – see Baekseok College
- Chonbuk National University – Jeonju, North Jeolla
- Cheonan National Technical College – Cheonan, South Chungcheong
- Cheonan University – Cheonan, South Chungcheong
- Cheonan Yonam College – Cheonan, South Chungcheong
- Cheongju National University of Education – Cheongju, North Chungcheong
- Cheongju Polytechnic College – Cheongju, North Chungcheong
- Cheongju University – Cheongju, North Chungcheong
- Cheongshim Graduate School of Theology – Gapyeong-gun, Gyeonggi-do
- Chinju National University of Education – Jinju, South Gyeongsang
- Chodang University – Muan County, South Jeolla
- Chonbuk National University – see Jeonbuk National University
- Chongin College – see Jeonbuk Science College
- Chongju National College of Science and Technology – Cheongju and Jeungpyeong County, North Chungcheong
- Chongju University – see Cheongju University
- Chongshin University – Seoul
- Chonnam National University – Gwangju
- Choonhae College – Ulsan
- Chosun University – Gwangju
- Christian College of Nursing – Gwangju
- Chugye University for the Arts – Seoul
- Chuncheon Polytechnic College – Chuncheon, Gangwon
- Chuncheon National University of Education – Chuncheon, Gangwon
- Chung Cheong University – Cheongju, North Chungcheong
- Chung-Ang University – Seoul and Anseong City, Gyeonggi
- Chungbuk National University – Cheongju, North Chungcheong
- Chungbuk Provincial College – Okcheon County, North Chungcheong
- Chungju National University – Chungju, North Chungcheong
- Chungkang College of Cultural Industries – Icheon, Gyeonggi
- Chungnam Provincial College – South Chungcheong
- Chungnam National University – Daejeon
- Chungwoon University – Hongseong County, South Chungcheong
- Chunnam Techno University – Gokseong County, South Jeolla

== D ==
See also under T

- Daebul University – Yeongam County, South Jeolla
- Daecheon College – see Ajou Motor College
- Daedong College – Busan
- Daeduk College – Daejeon
- Daegu Arts University – Chilgok County, North Gyeongsang
- Daegu Cyber University – Gyeongsan, North Gyeongsang
- Daegu Haany University – Gyeongsan, North Gyeongsang and Daegu
- Daegu Health College – Daegu
- Daegu Gyeongbuk Institute of Science and Technology – Daegu
- Daegu Mirae College – Gyeongsan, North Gyeongsang
- Daegu National University of Education – Daegu
- Daegu Polytechnic College – Daegu
- Daegu Technical University – Daegu
- Daegu University – Gyeongsan, North Gyeongsang
- Daegu University of Foreign Studies – Gyeongsan, North Gyeongsang
- Daehan Graduate School of Theology – Anyang, Gyeonggi
- Daejin University – Pocheon, Gyeonggi
- Daejeon Health Sciences College – Daejeon
- Daejeon Polytechnic College – Daejeon
- Daejeon University – Daejeon Shini Kunku
- Daelim College – Anyang, Gyeonggi
- Daewon Science College – Jecheon, North Chungcheong
- Dankook University – Seoul and Cheonan City, South Chungcheong
- Dong-A College – Yeongam County, South Jeolla
- Dong-A University – Busan
- Dong-Ah Broadcasting College – Anseong, Gyeonggi
- Donga College of Health
- Dongduk Women's University – Seoul
- Dong-eui University – Busan
- Dongguk University – Seoul and Gyeongju City, North Gyeongsang
- Dongju College – Busan
- Dongkang College – Gwangju
- Dongnam Health College – Suwon, Gyeonggi
- Dong-Pusan College – Busan
- Dongseo University – Busan
- Dong Seoul College – Seongnam, Gyeonggi
- Dongshin University – Naju, South Jeolla
- Dong-U College – Sokcho, Gangwon
- Dongyang Mirae University – Seoul
- Dongwon Institute of Science and Technology
- Doowon Technical College – Anseong, Gyeonggi
- Duksung Women's University – Seoul

== E ==
- Ewha Womans University – Seoul
- Eulji University – Daejeon

== F ==
- Far East University – Eumseong County, North Chungcheong

== G ==
See also under K

- Gachon Medical School – Incheon
- Gachongil College – Incheon
- Gachon University – Seongnam, Gyeonggi
- Gangdong College – Eumseong, North Chungcheong
- Gangneung-Wonju National University – Gangneung, Gangwon
- Gangneung Yeongdong College – Gangneung, Gangwon
- Gangwon Provincial College – Gangneung, Gangwon
- Geochang Polytechnic College – Geochang, South Gyeongsang
- George Mason University – Songdo, Incheon
- Geumgang University – Nonsan
- Ghent University – Songdo, Incheon
- Gimcheon Science College – see Kimcheon Science College
- Gochang Polytechnic College – Gochang County, North Jeolla
- Gongju National University of Education – Gongju, South Chungcheong
- Graduate School of Interpretation and Translation (GSIT) – see Hankuk University of Foreign Studies
- Graduate School of Korean Studies – Seongnam, Gyeonggi
- Gukje Digital University – Suwon, Gyeonggi
- Gumi University – Gumi, North Gyeongsang
- Gumi Polytechnic College – Gumi, North Gyeongsang
- Gwangju Catholic University – Gwangju
- Gwangju Health University – Gwangju
- Gwangju Institute of Science and Technology (GIST) – Gwangju
- Gwangju National University of Education – Gwangju
- Gwangju Polytechnic College – Gwangju
- Gwangju University – Gwangju
- Gyeongbuk Provincial College - North Gyeongsang
- Gyeongin National University of Education – Incheon
- Gyeongju University – Gyeongju, North Gyeongsang
- Gyeongnam National University of Science and Technology – Jinju
- Gyeongnam Provincial Geochang College - South Gyeongsang
- Gyeongnam Provincial Namhae College - South Gyeongsang
- Gyeongsang National University – Jinju, South Gyeongsang
- Gimcheon University – Gimcheon, North Gyeongsang
- Gumi University – Gumi, North Gyeongsang

== H ==
- Halla University – Wonju, Gangwon
- Hallym College of Information and Industry – Chuncheon, Gangwon
- Hallym University – Chuncheon, Gangwon
- Hanbat National University – Daejeon
- Handong Global University – Pohang, North Gyeongsang
- Hanil University – Wanju County, North Jeolla and Jeonju, North Jeolla
- Hankuk Aviation University – Goyang, Gyeonggi
- Hankuk University of Foreign Studies – Seoul & Gyeonggi
- Hankyong National University – Anseong, Gyeonggi
- Hanlyo University – Gwangyang, South Jeolla
- Hanmin University – Yeonsan
- Hannam University – Daejon
- Hansei University – Gunpo, Gyeonggi
- Hanseo University – Seosan, South Chungcheong
- Hanshin University – Osan, Gyeonggi
- Hansung Technical College(서울예술직업전문학교) – Seoul
- Hansung University – Seoul
- Hanyang University – Seoul
- Hanyang Cyber University
- Hanyang Women's University – Seoul
- Hanyeong College – Yeosu, South Jeolla
- Hanyoung Theological University – Seoul
- Hanzhung University – Donghae, Ganwon
- Hapdong Theological Seminary – Suwon, Gyeonggi
- Honam Theological University and Seminary – Gwangju
- Honam University – Gwangju
- Hongik University – Seoul
- Hongseong Polytechnic College – Hongseong County, South Chungcheong
- Hoseo University – Asan, South Chungcheong
- Howon University – Gunsan, North Jeolla
- Hyechon College – Daejeon
- Hyejeon College – Hongseong County, South Chungcheong
- Hyupsung University – Hwaseong, Gyeonggi

== I ==
- Information and Communications University – Daejeon
- Iksan National College – Iksan, North Jeolla
- Incheon Catholic University – Incheon
- Incheon National University – Incheon
- Incheon Polytechnic College – Incheon
- Incheon National University of Education – see Gyeongin National University of Education
- Induk University – Seoul
- Inha Technical College – Incheon
- Inha University – Incheon
- Inje University – Gimhae, South Gyeongsang
- International Graduate School of English – Seoul
- International University of Korea

== J ==
See also under C

- Jangan University – Hwaseong, Gyeonggi
- JEI University – Incheon
- Jecheon Polytechnic College – Jecheon, North Chungcheong
- Jeju College of Technology – Jeju City, Jeju (unification with Tamna University, now Jeju International putkaUniversity)
- Jeju International University – Jeju City, Jeju
- Jeju National University – Jeju City, Jeju
- Jeonbuk Polytechnic College – Gimje, North Jeolla
- Jeonju Kijeon Women's College – Jeonju, North Jeolla
- Jeonju National University of Education – Jeonju, North Jeolla
- Jeonju Technical College – Jeonju, North Jeolla
- Jeonju University – Jeonju, North Jeolla
- Jeonnam Provincial College – Damyang County and Jangheung County, South Jeolla
- Jinju College – Jinju, South Gyeongsang
- Jinju Health College – Jinju, South Gyeongsang
- Jinju National University – Jinju, South Gyeongsang
- Jisan College – see Catholic University of Pusan
- Joong-ang Sangha University – Gimpo, Gyeonggi
- Joongbu University – Geumsan County, South Chungcheong and Goyang
- Jungseok Institute of Technology – Seoul
- Juseong College – Cheongwon County, North Chungcheong

== K ==
See also under G

- KAIST – Daejeon, abbreviated term of Korea Advanced Institute of Science and Technology
- Kangnam University – Yongin, Gyeonggi
- Kangwon National University – Chuncheon and Samcheok, Gangwon
- Kangwon Tourism College – Taebaek, Gangwon
- Kaya University – Goryeong, North Gyeongsang and Gimhae, South Gyeongsang
- Kaywon School of Art and Design (계원예술대학교)– Uiwang, Gyeonggi
- KDI School of Public Policy and Management – Seoul
- Keimyung College – Daegu
- Keimyung University – Daegu
- Keukdong College – Eumseong County, North Chungcheong
- Kimcheon Science College – Gimcheon, North Gyeongsang
- Kimpo College – Gimpo, Gyeonggi
- Kkottongnae Hyundo University of Social Welfare – Cheongwon County, North Chungcheong
- Koguryeo College
- Koje College – Geoje, South Gyeonsang
- Kongju Communication Arts College(공주영상정보대학) – Gongju, South Chungcheong
- Kongju National University – Gongju, South Chungcheong
- Konkuk University – Seoul and Chungju City, North Chungcheong
- Konyang University – Nonsan, South Chungcheong and Daejeon
- Kookmin University – Seoul
- Korea Aerospace University – Goyang, Gyeonggi
- Korea Air Force Academy – Cheongwon County, North Chungcheong
- Korea Baptist Theological University – Daejeon
- Korea Christian University(그리스도대학교) – Seoul
- Korea Cyber University – Seoul
- Korea Digital University – Seoul
- Korea Maritime University – Busan
- Korea Military Academy – Seoul
- Korea National College of Rehabilitation and Welfare – Pyeongtaek, Gyeonggi
- Korea National Defense University – Seoul
- Korea National Open University – Seoul
- Korea National Police University – Yongin, Gyeonggi
- Korea National University of Arts – Seoul
- Korea National University of Education – Cheongwon County, North Chungcheong
- Korea National University of Transportation - Chungju City, North Chungcheong
- Korea National Railroad College – Uiwang, Gyeonggi
- Korea National Sport University – Seoul
- Korea Nazarene University – Cheonan, South Chungcheong
- Korea Polytechnics
  - Korea Polytechnic I – Seoul and Seongnam, Gyeonggi
  - Korea Polytechnic II – Anseong, Incheon, Hwaseong, Gyeonggi
  - Korea Polytechnic III – Chuncheon, Wonju and Gangneung
  - Korea Polytechnic IV – Daejeon, Cheongju, Chungju, Asan and Hongseong
  - Korea Polytechnic V – Gwangju, Gimje, Mokpo, Iksan and Suncheon
  - Korea Polytechnic VI – Daegu, Gumi, Pohang and Yeongju
  - Korea Polytechnic VII – Busan, Ulsan, Changwon and Jinju
  - Korea Aviation Polytechnic – Sacheon, South Gyeongsang
  - Korea Bio Polytechnic – Nonsan, South Chungcheong
  - Korea Textile and Fashion Polytechnic – Daegu
  - Korea Women's Polytechnic – Gyeonggi
- Korea Polytechnic University
- Korea Tourism College – Icheon, Gyeonggi
- Korea University – Seoul
- Korea University of Science and Technology – Seoul, Suwon, Changwon, Ansan, Seongnam, and Daejeon
- Korea University of Technology and Education – Cheonan, South Chungcheong
- Korean National University of Cultural Heritage – Buyeo County, South Chungcheong
- Korean Bible University – Seoul
- Kosin University – Busan
- Kukje Theological University and Seminary – Seoul
- Kumoh National Institute of Technology – Gumi, North Gyeongsang
- Kunjang College – Gunsan, North Jeolla
- Kunsan College of Nursing – Gunsan, North Jeolla
- Kunsan National University – Gunsan, North Jeolla
- Kwandong University – Gangneung, Gangwon
- Kwangju Institute of Science and Technology – Gwangju
- Kwangju Polytechnic College – Gwangju
- Kwangju Women's University – Gwangju
- Kwangshin University – Gwangju
- Kwangwoon University – Seoul
- Kwangyang Health College – Gwangyang, South Jeolla
- Kyeyak Graduate School of Theology – Gwangju, Gyeonggi
- Kyongbuk College of Science – Chilgok County, North Gyeongsang
- Kyonggi Institute of Technology – Siheung, Gyeonggi
- Kyonggi University – Seoul and Suwon City, Gyeonggi
- Kyongju University – see Gyeongju University
- Kyungbok University – Pocheon, Gyeonggi
- Kyungbuk College – Yeongju, North Gyeongsang
- Kyungbuk Foreign Language Techno College – Gyeongsan, North Gyeongsang
- Kyungdong College of Techno-Information – Gyeongsan, North Gyeongsang
- Kyungdong University – Goseong, Gangwon
- Kyunghee University – Seoul
- Kyung Hee Cyber University – Seoul
- Kyungil University – Gyeongsan City, North Gyeongsang
- Kyungin Women's College – Incheon
- Kyungmin College – Uijeongbu, Gyeonggi
- Kyungmoon College – Pyeongtaek, Gyeonggi
- Kyungnam College of Information and Technology – Busan
- Kyungnam University – Changwon, South Gyeongsang
- Kyungpook National University – Daegu
- Kyungsung University – Busan
- Kyungwon College – Seongnam, Gyeonggi
- Kyungwoon University – Gumi, North Gyeongsang

== L ==
- Luther University – Yongin, Gyeonggi

== M ==
- Masan University – Masan, South Gyeongsang
- Methodist Theological University(감리교신학대학교) – Seoul
- Miryang National University – Miryang, South Gyeongsang
- Mokpo Catholic University – Mokpo, South Jeolla
- Mokpo National Maritime University – Mokpo, South Jeolla
- Mokpo National University – Mokpo, South Jeolla
- Mokpo Polytechnic College – Mokpo, South Jeolla
- Mokpo Science University – Mokpo, South Jeolla
- Mokwon University – Daejeon
- Mun Kyung College – Mungyeong, North Gyeongsang
- Myongji University – Seoul
- Myungshin University – Suncheon, South Jeolla

== N ==
- Naju College – Naju, South Jeolla
- Nambu University – Gwangju
- Namseoul University – Cheonan, South Chungcheong
- National Medical Center College of Nursing(국립의료원 간호대학) – Seoul

== O ==
- Open Cyber University – Seoul
- Osan University – Osan, Gyeonggi

== P ==
See also under B

- Paekche Institute of the Arts – Wanju County, North Jeolla
- Pai Chai University – Daejeon
- Pohang College – Pohang, North Gyeongsang
- Pohang University of Science and Technology (POSTECH) – Pohang, North Gyeongsang
- Presbyterian College and Theological Seminary(장로회신학대학교) – Seoul
- Pukyong National University – Busan
- Pusan Arts College – Busan
- Pusan National University – Busan
- Pusan University of Foreign Studies – Busan
- Pusan Women's College – Busan
- Pyeongtaek University – Pyeongtaek, Gyeonggi

== R ==
- Red Cross College of Nursing(적십자간호대학) – Seoul

== S ==
- Saekyung College – Yeongwol County, Gangwon
- Sahmyook University – Seoul
- Samcheok National University – Samcheok, Gangwon (unification with Kangwon National University, now KNU Samcheok Campus)
- Sangji University – Wonju, Gangwon
- Sangju National University – Sangju, North Gyeongsang
- Sangmyung University – Seoul and Cheonan City, South Chungcheong
- Sejong University – Seoul
- Semin Digital University – Daegu
- Semyung University – Jecheon, North Chungcheong
- Seoil University – Seoul
- Seojeong University - Yangju, Gyeonggi
- Seoyeong University – Gwangju
- Seokyeong University – Seoul
- Seongnam Polytechnic College – Seongnam, Gyeonggi
- Seoul Bible Graduate School of Theology – Seoul
- Seoul Christian University – Seoul
- Seoul Cyber University – Seoul
- Seoul Digital University – Seoul
- Seoul Health College – Seongnam, Gyeonggi
- Seoul Institute of the Arts – Ansan, Gyeonggi
- Seoul IT Polytechnic College – Seoul
- Seoul Jangsin University – Seoul and Gwangju City, Gyeonggi
- Seoul-Jeongsu Polytechnic College – Seoul
- Seoul National University – Seoul
- Seoul National University of Education – Seoul
- Seoul National University of Science and Technology – Seoul
- Seoul Sports Graduate University – Seoul
- Seoul Theological University – Bucheon, Gyeonggi
- Seoul Women's College of Nursing – Seoul
- Seoul Women's University – Seoul
- Seowon University – Cheongju, North Chungcheong
- Shin Ansan University – Ansan, Gyeonggi
- Shingu College – Seongnam, Gyeonggi
- Shinheung College – Uijeongbu, Gyeonggi
- Shinsung University – Dangjin County, South Chungcheong
- Silla University – Busan
- Sogang University – Seoul
- Sohae College – Gunsan, North Jeolla
- Songho College – Hoengseong County, Gangwon
- Songwon University – Gwangju
- Sookmyung Women's University – Seoul
- Soonchunhyang University – Asan, South Chungcheong
- Soong Eui Women's College – Seoul
- Soongsil University – Seoul
- Sorabol College – Gyeongju, North Gyeongsang
- State University of New York Korea – Yeonsu, Incheon
- Suncheon Cheongam College – Suncheon, South Jeolla
- Suncheon First College – Suncheon, South Jeolla
- Sunchon National University – Suncheon, South Jeolla
- Sung-duk College – Yeongcheon, North Gyeongsang
- Sungsan Hyodo Graduate School – Incheon
- Sunghwa College – Gangjin County, South Jeolla
- Sungkonghoe University – Seoul
- Sungkyul University – Anyang, Gyeonggi
- Sungkyunkwan University – Seoul and Suwon City, Gyeonggi
- Sungmin University – Cheonan and Seoul
- Sungshin Women's University – Seoul
- Sunlin University – Pohang, North Gyeongsang
- Sunmoon University – Asan and Cheonan, South Chungcheong
- Suwon Catholic University – Hwaseong, Gyeonggi
- Suwon Science College – Hwaseong, Gyeonggi
- Suwon Women's College – Suwon

== T ==
See also under D

- Taegu Science College – Daegu
- Taejae University – Seoul
- Taekyeung University – Gyeongsan, North Gyeongsang
- Taeshin Christian University(대신대학교) – Gyeongsan, North Gyeongsang
- Tamna University – Seogwipo, Jeju (unification with Jeju College of Technology, now Jeju International University)
- Tongmyong University – Busan
- Tongwon University – Gwangju, Gyeonggi
- Torch Trinity Graduate University – Seoul
- Transnational Law and Business University – Goyang, Gyeonggi

== U ==
- Uiduk University – Gyeongju, North Gyeongsang
- Ulsan College – Ulsan
- Ulsan National Institute of Science and Technology – Ulsan
- University of Incheon – Incheon
- University of Seoul – Seoul
- University of Science & Technology - Daejeon and Seoul
- University of Suwon – Suwon
- University of Ulsan – Ulsan
- University of Utah Asia Campus – Songdo, Incheon

== W ==
- Westminster Graduate School of Theology(웨스트민스터신학대학원대학교) – Seoul
- Won Buddhism Graduate School(원불교대학원대학교) – Iksan, North Jeolla
- Wonju National College – Wonju, Gangwon
- Wonkwang Health Science College(원광보건대학교) – Iksan, North Jeolla
- Wonkwang University – Iksan, North Jeolla
- Woongji Accounting & Tax College(웅지세무대학교) – Paju, Gyeonggi
- Woosong Information College(우송정보대학) – Daejeon
- Woosong Technical College – Daejeon
- Woosong University – Daejeon
- Woosuk University – Wanju County, North Jeolla

== Y ==
- Yaeil Theological Seminary – Seoul
- Yangsan College – Yangsan, South Gyeongsang
- Yeojoo Institute of Technology – Yeoju County, Gyeonggi
- Yeungjin College – Daegu
- Yeungnam College of Science and Technology – Daegu
- Yeungnam University – Gyeongsan, North Gyeongsang
- Yeonsung University – Anyang, Gyeonggi
- Yewon Arts University – Imsil County, North Jeolla
- Yonam Institute of Digital Technology – Jinju, South Gyeongsang
- Yong-in Songdam College – Yongin, Gyeonggi
- Yong-In University – Yongin, Gyeonggi
- Yonsei University – Seoul and Wonju City, Gangwon
- Yosu National University – Yeosu, South Jeolla
- Youngdong University – Yeongdong County, North Chungcheong
- Youngnam Theological College and Seminary – Gyeongsan, North Gyeongsang
- Youngsan University – Yangsan, South Gyeongsang
- Youngsan Won Buddhist University – Yeonggwang County, South Jeolla
- Yuhan College – Bucheon, Gyeonggi

== See also ==
- List of research universities in the South Korea
- Lists of universities and colleges
- List of universities and colleges in Seoul
- List of universities in North Korea
- Tertiary education
