= Korea Polytechnics =

School type in South Korea

- 한국폴리텍대학
- Motto: 평생기술로 평생직업을
- Type: vocational school
- Established: 2006
- Location: Seoul, South Korea; 37.547348°N 126.949886°E
- Website: www.kopo.ac.kr

Korea Polytechnics (Korean: 한국폴리텍대학) mean two or three-years public vocational school in South Korea. It has 11 colleges in 34 cities.

== List of schools ==
Image	Name	Location	Region	Division	References	Notes
	Seoul Jungsu Campus	Yongsan, Seoul	Metropolitan Area	Korea Polytechnic I		
	Seongnam Campus	Seongnam, Gyeonggi	Metropolitan Area	Korea Polytechnic I		
	Seoul Gangseo Campus	Gangseo, Seoul	Metropolitan Area	Korea Polytechnic I		
	Bundang Convergence Technology Education Center	Seongnam-si, Gyeonggi-do	Metropolitan Area	Korea Polytechnic I		
	Jeju Campus	Jeju City, Jeju	Jeju Island	Korea Polytechnic I		
	Gwangmyeong Convergence Technology Education Center	Gwangmyeong-si, Gyeonggi-do	Metropolitan Area	Korea Polytechnic II		
	Incheon Campus	Bupyeong, Incheon	Metropolitan Area	Korea Polytechnic II		
	Namincheon Campus	Nam-gu, Incheon	Metropolitan Area	Korea Polytechnic II		
	Hwaseong (Mars) Campus	Hwaseong, Gyeonggi	Metropolitan Area	Korea Polytechnic II		
	Chuncheon Campus	Chuncheon, Gangwon	Gangwon-do	Korea Polytechnic III		
	Gangneung Campus	Gangneung, Gangwon	Gangwon-do	Korea Polytechnic III		
	Wonju Campus	Wonju, Gangwon	Gangwon-do	Korea Polytechnic III		
	Daejeon Campus	Dong-gu, Daejeon	Chungcheong Province	Korea Polytechnic IV		
	Cheongju Campus	Cheongju, North Chungcheong	Chungcheong Province	Korea Polytechnic IV		
	Asan Campus	Asan, South Chungcheong	Chungcheong Province	Korea Polytechnic IV		
	Chungju Campus	Chungju, North Chungcheong	Chungcheong Province	Korea Polytechnic IV		
	Chungnam Campus	Hongseong-gun, Chungcheongnam-do	Chungcheong Province	Korea Polytechnic IV		
	Gwangju Campus	Buk-gu, Gwangju	Jeolla-do	Korea Polytechnic V		
	Iksan Campus	Iksan, North Jeolla	Jeolla-do	Korea Polytechnic V		
	Suncheon Campus	Suncheon, South Jeolla	Jeolla-do	Korea Polytechnic V		
	Jeonbuk Campus	Gimje-si, Jeollabuk-do	Jeolla-do	Korea Polytechnic V		
	Jeonnam Campus	Muan-gun, Jeollanam-do	Jeolla-do	Korea Polytechnic V		
	Daegu Campus	Seo-gu, Daegu	Gyeongsang-do	Korea Polytechnic VI		
	Gumi Campus	Gumi, North Gyeongsang	Gyeongsang-do	Korea Polytechnic VI		
	Pohang Campus	Pohang, North Gyeongsang	Gyeongsang-do	Korea Polytechnic VI		
	Yeongju Campus	Yeongju, North Gyeongsang	Gyeongsang-do	Korea Polytechnic VI		
	Namdaegu Campus	Dalseong-gun, Daegu	Gyeongsang-do	Korea Polytechnic VI		
	Yeongnam Convergence Technology Campus	Dong-gu, Daegu	Gyeongsang-do	Korea Polytechnic VI		
	Changwon Campus	Changwon, South Gyeongsang	Gyeongsang-do	Korea Polytechnic VII		
	Busan Campus	Buk-gu, Busan	Gyeongsang-do	Korea Polytechnic VII		
	Ulsan Campus	Jung-gu, Ulsan	Gyeongsang-do	Korea Polytechnic VII		
	East Busan Campus	Gijang, Busan	Gyeongsang-do	Korea Polytechnic VII		
	Jinju Campus	Jinju, South Gyeongsang	Gyeongsang-do	Korea Polytechnic VII		
	Korea Aviation Polytechnic	Sacheon, South Gyeongsang	Gyeongsang-do			
	Korea Bio Polytechnic	Nonsan-si, Chungcheongnam-do	Chungcheong Province			
	Semiconductor Convergence Campus	Anseong-si, Gyeonggi-do	Metropolitan Area			
	Talent Source	Namwon-si, Jeollabuk-do	Jeolla-do			
	New Technology Education Center	Jeonju-si, Jeollabuk-do	Jeolla-do			
	Dasom High School	Jecheon-si, Chungcheongbuk-do	Chungcheong Province			
