= Korea Polytechnic Semi Convergence =

South Korean women's polytechnic college

Coordinates: 37.0082°N 127.1763°E

Ansung Polytechnic College (Ansung Women's Polytechnic College)
- Location: Anseong, Gyeonggi, South Korea
- Website: http://www.ans.ac.kr/

Ansung Polytechnic College, formerly known as Ansung Women's Polytechnic College until 2005, was South Korea's only women's polytechnic college. In 2015 It adopted coed policy and was used as Korea Polytechnics Anseong Campus. In 2020 it was rebranded as Korea Polytechnics' semiconductor campus.

It was located in Anseong City, Gyeonggi province. It contained departments of nanotechnology, digital design, CAD and computer modelling, internet media, and jewelry technology. Unlike most technical colleges, it included a dormitory, which can house as many as 420 students. The school graduates about 600 students per year from its technical training programs.

== See also ==
- Education in South Korea
- List of colleges and universities in South Korea
