= Baekseok University =

Private Christian university in Cheonan, South Chungcheong, South Korea

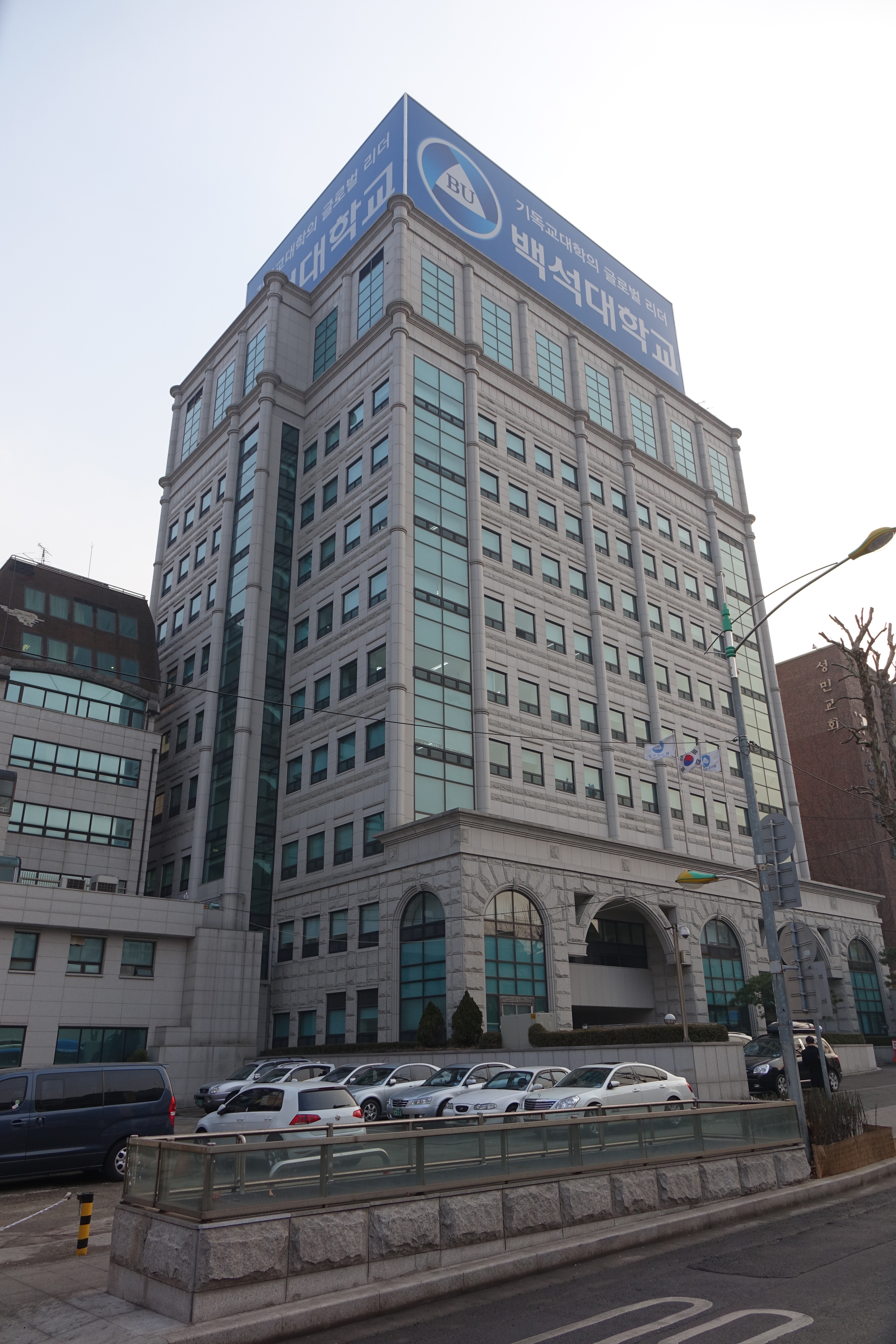
- Type: Private
- Established: 1994
- Students: 15,000
- Location: Cheonan, South Chungcheong, South Korea; 36.84021°N 127.18322°E
- Website: http://www.bu.ac.kr/

- Baekseok University
- Hangul: 백석대학교
- Hanja: 白石大學校
- RR: Baekseok daehakgyo
- MR: Paeksŏk taehakkyo

Baekseok University is a private Christian institution of higher education, located in Cheonan City, in northern South Chungcheong province, South Korea. It carries a maximum enrollment of 15,000.

== Academics ==
Undergraduate offerings are divided among twelve divisions: Christian Studies, Language and Literature, Social Welfare, Law and Public Administration, Business and Commerce, Tourism, Education, Information and Communication, Health Science, Christian Fine Arts, Music, and Design and Imaging. Graduate offerings are provided by schools of Christian Studies, Christian Fine Arts, Divinity, Pastoral Theology, Education, Social Welfare, Counseling, and Information Technology.

== History ==
The university was established by the Baekseok Educational Foundation, which also founded Baekseok Culture University. It opened its doors in 1994, at which time it provided instruction primarily in Christian theology. It became a college the following year, and a university one year thereafter, at which time the graduate school was also established.

== Notable people ==
- Gong Min-ji
- Jung Taek-woon
- Kim Na-young
- Lee Jae-hwan

== Sister schools ==
Baekseok University has international exchange relationships with three institutions in America: Bloomfield College, Azusa Pacific University, and Calvin College. It also has ties with several other East Asian institutions: Tianjin Foreign Studies University, Beijing Language and Culture University, Heilongjiang University, Zhejiang University, Wuhan University, Hwanan University, Shanghai Normal University, Liaoning Normal University, and Ningbo University in China, and Nagasaki University of Foreign Studies, Aichi Shukutoku University, Tokyo Seitoku University, Kochi University, Sacred Heart University, and Beppu University in Japan. Such relationships also exist with the Irkutsk National University of Education in Russia and with the University of South Australia, Tabor College, and International College of Hotel Management in Australia, as well as universities in Vietnam, Malaysia, and Hong Kong.

== See also ==
- List of colleges and universities in South Korea
- Education in South Korea
