= GHU =

GHU may refer to:

- Gualeguaychú Airport, in Argentina
- Gwangju Health University, in South Korea
