= Woosong Technical College =

College in South Korea

- Location: Daejeon, Daejeon, South Korea
- Campus: Urban (Daejeon Campus)
- Website: http://www.wst.ac.kr

Woosong Technical College was a college in Daejeon, South Korea. In 2008 now-Ministry of Education granted its closure and its merger with Woosong University into Woosong University.

== See also ==
- List of colleges and universities in South Korea
- Education in South Korea
