= Byuksung College =

Private technical college

Coordinates: 35.873°N 126.913°E

- Type: Private
- Active: 1995–2014
- President: Choong-Ryeol Ryu
- Students: 439
- Location: Gimje, North Jeolla, South Korea
- Website: www.byuksung.ac.kr/

- Byuksung College
- Hangul: 벽성대학
- Hanja: 碧城大學
- RR: Byeokseong daehak
- MR: Pyŏksŏng taehak

Byuksung College was a private technical college located in Gimje, North Jeolla province, in southwestern South Korea. In 2012 now-Ministry of Education ordered the closure of the college as it failed to implement meaningful policies and changes in response to audits conducted by the Ministry and Board of Audit and Inspection. The college officially closed in 2014 after it lost all legal battles and decided not to bring the case to the Supreme Court.

The graduating class of 2004 included 439 students.

== Academic departments ==
- Car Service
- Machine Design
- Data Communication
- Electronic Circuit Design
- Automatic Systems
- Software Development
- Office Data Systems
- Interior Design
- Visual Multimedia Design
- Architecture
- Construction Safety
- Environmental Civil Engineering
- Broadcasting
- Child Welfare
- Media English

== History ==
The school was founded as Byuksung Technical College (벽성전문대학) in 1995, and changed its name to simply Byuksung College in 1998.

== See also ==
- List of colleges and universities in South Korea
- Education in South Korea
