= Koguryeo College =

University in Naju, South Korea

- Former names: Geumseong Environment College (1995–1998); Naju College (1998–2009)
- Motto: 연학, 봉사, 창의 (Korean)
- Motto in English: Pursuit of study, Volunteer, Originality
- Type: Private junior college
- Established: January 25, 1995; 31 years ago
- Founder: Kim Gwang-ah
- President: Shin Yun-gil
- Total staff: 168 (Spring 2020)
- Students: 1,295 (Spring 2022)
- Location: Naju, South Jeolla Province, 58280, South Korea; 35°00′27″N 126°38′58″E
- Colours: Green
- Mascots: Ginkgo biloba, Pear blossom
- Website: www.kgrc.ac.kr

Korean name
- Hangul: 고구려대학교
- Hanja: 高句麗大學校
- RR: Goguryeo daehakgyo
- MR: Koguryŏ taehakkyo

Koguryeo College (Korean: 고구려대학교) is a college located in Naju, South Korea. It is a member of the Korean Council for University College Education.

== History ==
A legal registration of the educational foundation, Ashin Institute, was completed in January 1995. Koguryeo College first opened in March as Geumseong Environment College, the first of its kind in South Korea to focus on environmental studies. In April, the Institute of Environmental Studies was founded to investigate issues of environmental sciences.

In May 1998, the college officially changed its name to Naju College.

In October 2009, the college was renamed Koguryeo College to honour the culture of Goguryeo and embark on a future-oriented campaign. The college published the 40 billion won blueprint to expand facilities and improve the quality of education, but the founder of the college was arrested and charged with embezzlement of funds. The college since faced other internal complications, and a newspaper dubbed the college "the everything of private school corruption".

Koguryeo College was restricted in getting financial aid from the government including state scholarships in 2013, and received the rating of D+ in the government-led university structural reform evaluation in 2015. The college was included in the lower group of the governmental review on basic capabilities of colleges and universities in 2018, 2021 and 2022, and the college was restricted from participating in state-funded research, scholarship and student loan programmes.

== Academics ==
Koguryeo College offers associate degrees in 18 academic majors as of 2022, including insect industry programme that was designated as an expert training institution by the Administrator of the Rural Development Administration under the Insect Industry Promotion And Support Act.

International programmes of Koguryeo College are organised through the Office of International Affairs, and the college has international academic cooperations with various institutions including Don Honorio Ventura State University and Qiqihar University. Also, the college has established sister school relationship with Kyrgyz-Russian Slavic University since 1995. In 2017, Koguryeo College established an agreement with New Zealand's Auckland Tourism, Events and Economic Development that would facilitate student educational activities.

In 2014 edition of Webometrics Ranking of World Universities, Koguryeo College was ranked #10,327 of all higher education institutions worldwide, placing it #2,063 in the continental ranking.

News reports revealed that some students earned certificates and degrees though they barely attended lectures. In 2021, the college was inspected by the Ministry of Education and it was revealed that the college admitted students who did not pay fees, and gave credits even though students did not sit in lectures properly.
