= Daegu University of Foreign Studies =

Coordinates: 35.7847°N 128.7270°E

- Type: Private
- Active: 1997–2018
- President: Lee Yeong Jo(이영조)
- Location: Gyeongsan, North Gyeongsang Province, South Korea
- Website: http://www.dufs.ac.kr/

- Daegu University of Foreign Studies
- Hangul: 대구외국어대학교
- Hanja: 大邱外國語大學校
- RR: Daegu oegugeo daehakgyo
- MR: Taegu oegugŏ taehakkyo

Daegu University of Foreign Studies was a university of Foreign Studies in Gyeongsan, North Gyeongsang Province, South Korea. It was founded in 1997. In 2018 Ministry of Education ordered closure of the university due to its significant finance troubles and corruption of the founders and leadership after the special audit conducted following the lowest evaluation the university received in 2015.

== History ==
In 2015, an evaluation by the Ministry of Education rated the university in the lowest E group, resulting in the Ministry halting its monetary support and barring the University from all state-funded programs.

== See also ==
- List of colleges and universities in South Korea
- Education in South Korea
