= Jeju International University =

Private university in South Korea

Coordinates: 33.44216°N 126.57012°E

- 제주국제대학교(濟州國際大學校)
- Type: Private
- Established: 1972
- President: Choong-sok Koh
- Location: Jeju, South Korea
- Website: Official website

Korean name
- Hangul: 제주국제대학교
- Hanja: 濟州國際大學校
- RR: Jeju gukje daehakgyo
- MR: Cheju kukche taehakkyo

Jeju International University (Korean: 제주국제대학교) is Tamra University and Jeju University of Industry and Information are integrated and open to private universities, located in Jeju, South Korea. In 1972, it was admitted to Jeju Unemployment College. In 1982, it changed its name from Jeju Unemployment College to Jeju Special Forces College. In 1998, Jeju Junior College changed its name to Jeju Industrial Information College. In 1999, Jeju Industrial Information University was established and the Lifelong Education Center was approved the same year. Shim Kyu-ho (10th President) took office and was established as Jeju International University on March 1, 2012.

Since 2023, the university have been barred from receiving national scholarships and student loans. In 2025, the university received 10 new Korean students, and owed 30 billion won in unpaid wages.

== See also ==
- List of universities and colleges in South Korea
