= Korea Polytechnic IV Cheongju =

- Hangul: 청주기능대학
- Hanja: 淸州技能大學
- RR: Cheongju gineung daehak
- MR: Ch'ŏngju kinŭng taehak

Cheongju Polytechnic College (Korean: 청주기능대학) is a vocational college located in Cheongju, North Chungcheong Province, South Korea. The current president is Kwon-hyun Lee. The student body numbers about 760, and the teaching staff about 29.

== Academics ==
The school's academics are divided among six departments: Computer Aided Machinery, Mechatronics, Automation Systems, Electricity, Electronics, and Information & Communications Systems.

== See also ==
- Education in South Korea
- List of colleges and universities in South Korea
