= Kim Jung-woong =

South Korean businessman (born c. 1975)

- 김정웅
- Born: 1975 (age 49–50)
- Citizenship: South Korea
- Occupation: Businessman
- Employer: GP Club

Korean name
- Hangul: 김정웅
- RR: Gim Jeongung
- MR: Kim Chŏngung

Kim Jung-woong (Korean: 김정웅; born c. 1975) is a South Korean businessman. The chairman and significant majority owner of video game and cosmetics company GP Club, he is among the richest people in South Korea. In December 2024, Forbes estimated his net worth at US$1 billion and ranked him 33rd richest in the country.

== Biography ==
Kim was born in 1975 as the youngest of three siblings, with an older brother and sister. His father was a bank branch manager. However, he lost his job and the family's money after attempting to go into politics. He went into manual labor, and the family fell into financial hardship. When Kim was 15, his father died of liver cancer.

While still in school, he worked part-time in a video game store. After saving up enough money, as a high schooler, he was able to start his own videogame store he called "Game Paradise" (the origin of the name of "GP Club"). He was able to open a second branch of his store. By age 20, he had saved around US$500,000. He then served his mandatory military service for two years and studied interior design in Daelim University College for another two years. Afterwards, he opened six more branches of his store.

On September 5, 2003, he founded GP Club and began making business trips to China. He learned the Chinese language and culture, and observed the rise of the Korean Wave in the country. He began trading video game accessories between the countries. In 2013, he leveraged his connections in the country and worked as a distributor for South Korean cosmetics products there. After his prospects in this area faded, in April 2016 he began selling his own brand of body washes and lotions called JM Solution ("Journey to Miracle"). However, it quickly became caught up in the boycott of South Korean products in China beginning around 2016.

GP Club, instead of advertising, sent products to Chinese social media influencers. The product quickly became popular in China, despite the boycotts. Chinese daigou (international resellers) would purchase the products in South Korea and bring them back to China for resale. This led to the company's explosive growth; by the end of 2018, it sold more than 800 million face masks. By 2019 it sold more than a billion. Investment bank Goldman Sachs purchased a 5% stake in the company in October 2018. However, GP Club's sales were negatively impacted by the COVID-19 pandemic and by Chinese bans on South Korean imports. The company failed to secure its targeted pre-IPO funding. By 2021, its operating profit was half that of its 2018 profit. Goldman Sachs exited their position at a loss in 2022.

== Personal life ==
He has a wife (Park Oak) and daughter. Together, the family owned 95% of the company in 2019.
