= Edward Young-min Kwon =

South Korean celebrity chef (born 1972)

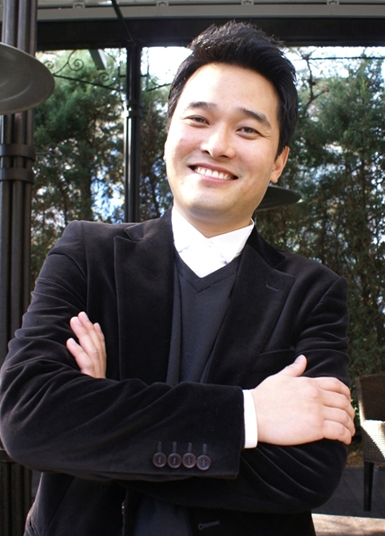
Edward Young-min Kwon

Edward Young-min Kwon (born February 10, 1972) is a South Korean celebrity chef who has made a mission for himself to globalize Korean cuisine. Kwon has held many senior chef positions in luxury hotels in the United States, China, and the Middle East.

== Background ==
Kwon was raised in Gangneung, a seaside town on the eastern coast of South Korea. Prior to his career as a culinary chef, he received an education at Gangneung Yeongdong College. Kwon had started his career at the Ritz-Carlton in Seoul and in 2001, transferred to San Francisco to work at the Ritz-Carlton Half Moon Bay. At age 32, Kwon decided to move back to South Korea to assume the position of executive sous chef at the W Hotel in Seoul. Soon after, Kwon went to China, and later became the hotel head chef at the Burj al-Arab Hotel in Dubai. In 2009, Kwon returned to Seoul. As of 2011, he hosted his own television show, Yes Chef.

== Restaurants ==
Kwon owns three restaurants in Seoul. Eddie's Café, located in the Seocho District, is a restaurant that offers European/Western style food at a mid-range price. Located in Hannam-dong is a restaurant called "The Mixed One". The Mixed One is a California Multi cuisine bistro offering reasonable prices. The third restaurant, Lab XXIV, located in Cheongdam-dong, features contemporary European styled cuisine.
