= Sang-Gyoo Lee =

South Korean theologian (born 1952)

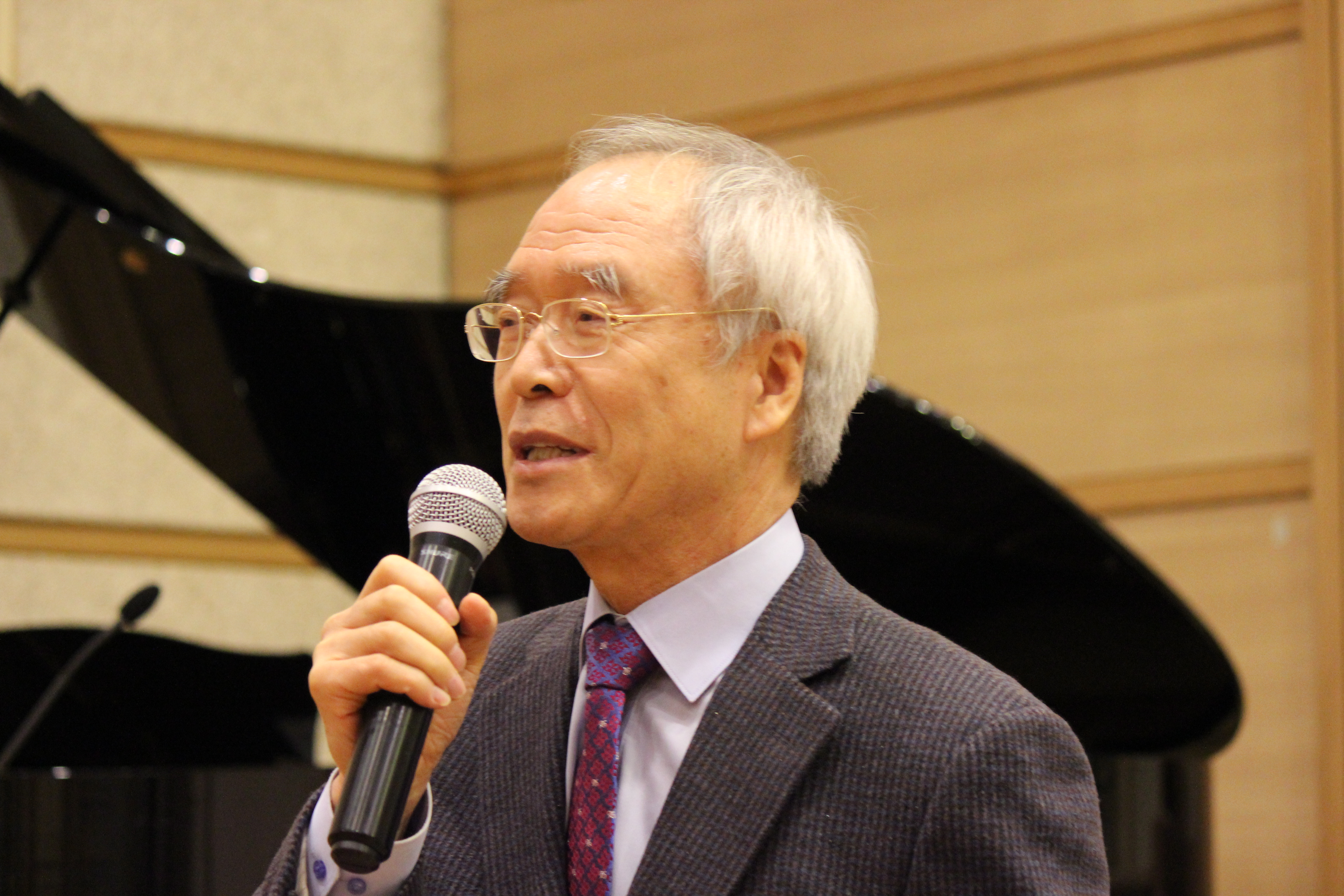
- Professor Sang-Gyoo Lee(이상규 교수)
- Born: December 13, 1953 (age 72); South Korea
- Occupations: Professor, Academic and Theologian
- Known for: Christianity in Korea, Early Christianity, Christianity, Calvinism
- Title: Chair Professor of the Church History, Early Christianity, and Korean church history

Academic background
- Education: Th.B, Th.M., M.Div, Th.D.
- Alma mater: Australian College of Theology

Academic work
- Institutions: Baekseok University

Sang-Gyoo Lee (Korean: 이상규; Hanja: 李象奎; born 13 December 1952) is a South Korean theologian and an honorary professor of the department of church history at Kosin University. He contributed to the discovery of historical documents of Korean church and is highly regarded as a Korean church historian. In 2012, he was selected as the theologian of the year at the 500th Anniversary of John Calvin's birth and received an academic award from the Korean Evangelical Theological Society on October 27, 2018. He served as president of the Korea Presbyterian Theological Society and president of the Reformed Theological Society. He is one of the editors of the International Theological Journal, Unio cum Christo. Since March 2019, he has been a chair professor at Baekseok University.

== Career ==
He studied at Kosin University, Presbyterian Theological College, and Australian College of Theology (Doctor of Theology). He visited many schools including Calvin University in Grand Rapids, Anabaptist Mennonite Biblical Seminary (AMBS), and Macquarie University, Australia (2002-2008). He is the director of Korea Church and History Institute (2005 ~ present), president of Busan Gyeongnam Church History Research Association (2006 ~ present). He was the president of Theological Society of Korea Presbyterian (March 29 ~ 2016), president of Society of Reformed Theology (2014. 10 ~ 2017), and a member of editorial board (February 2015) of International Journal Unio cum Christo. He retired Kosin University (1983-February 2019) and is now Baekseok University from 2019.

== Publications ==
- 100 Years of Calvin Studies in Korea (1884-1984)
- The Reformist Association, (1985)
- Theory and Practice of Bible Study, General Board of Education, 1986
- Church and Church History, S.F.C., July 1991
- Historical Trends of the Korean Church, General Assembly Education Committee, September 1991
- Commentary on the Westminster Confession of Faith, General Assembly Board of Education, 12 December 1991. [Declaration]
- Koramdeo Bible Study, General Assembly Board of Education, 1992 [Declaration]
- Marriage in the Christian Worldview. Assumption ”, CUP, (1992. 6) [Declaration]
- Happy Family Life CUP, May 5, 1993 [Declaration]
- Seoyunjae Illuminated in the Christian Worldview, CUP, October 10, 1993 [Co-author]
- Church Reformation History, Sungkwang Culture History, March 1997 [Book]
- How to Study Bible Studies? (1998. 3) [Book]
- 40 Years of Kosin Mission, General Publications, Sept. 1998
- History of the Church, Book Publishing, English (1999. 9) [Book] Reprint
- How Did Medical Missions Begin? (2000. 1) [Book]
- Watanabe Nobuo (Lee Sang-kyu), "What Is a Christian Compulsion?" (2000. 5)
- Pastor Han Sang Dong, His Life and Faith (Wangmadang, Nov. 2000)
- Pusan Christianity History (Glmadang, 2001, 11)
- Beyond Poverty and Riches (SFC, May 2002)
- What is the New Testament Book? (Sidney Central Presbyterian Church, May 2003)
- What is the Old Testament? (Sidney Central Presbyterian Church, 12 December 2003)
- Church Reform and Revival Movement (SFC, 2004)
- Korean Church History and Theology (Form of Life, 2007)
- God's Sovereignty on This Earth (SFC, 2013)
- History and Theology of the Korean Church (Form of Life, 2008, 2014)
- History and Theology of Presbyterian Churches after Liberation (Korea Christian History Research Institute, 2015)
- Beard's Missionary Journal (Korean Christian Museum, Soongsil University, 2013)
- Church Renewal Movement and the Formation of the High-faith Church (Style of Life, 2016)
- Early Christianity and Roman Society: Christianity under the Roman Empire (SFC: 2016)
- Kilson Engel's Korean Missions (Korea Christian Culture Institute, Soongsil University, 2017)
- Reading Reformation through Culture (Youngeumsa, 2017)
- Korean Church and Reformed Theology (Book Publication Caritas, 2018)

== Articles ==
There are his most important articles.

- A Study of the Christian Education under the Japanese Occupation: Especially concerned with the Educational Work of the Australian Presbyterian Mission = 일제하에서의 기독교 교육 활동에 관한 연구
- Shinto Shrine Issue of the 1930s in the South Kyung Sang Province : Especially concerned with the Australian Presbyterian Mission
- The Beginning and development of Protestantism in Korean, 1830-1888
- 한국장로교 100주년, 신학적 고찰 = A Centenary History of the Presbyterian Church in Korea, a Theological Appraisal
- 영남지역 기독교문화유산의 과제 = The Issues of Christian Cultural Heritage in the Gyungsang Province
- 한국장로교회에서의 세계교회협의회(W.C.C.) = W.C.C. in Korean Presbyterian Churches
- 교회사에서 본 장로제도 - 장로제도와 장로교 치리제도에 대한 역사적 고찰 - = A Historical Approach on the Development of Eldership
- 부산지방 기독교 전래사(1880-1900) = Church in Pusan
- 특집 : 한국 교회에서의 교회사 교육과 연구: 1900-1960년대까지 = A Brief History of Study and Education of Church History in Korean Churches from 1900 to 1960s
- 역사논문 : 민족과 교회: 한국교회 통일운동에 대한 복음주의적 평가 = Historical : Church And Nation: The Discussion of the National Unification of Korea from an Evangelical Perspective in the Korean Church
- 한국장로교회의 연합과 일치 : 1950년대 한국장로교회 분열과 연합에 대한 검토 = An Appraisal of the Divisions and Reunion in the Korean Presbyterian Church in the 1950s.

== Awards ==
- Academic Award of the Integrated Research Society Korea Church History Research Institute Academic Award (2010)
- Christian Culture Awards (2010)
- Theologian of the Year (2012) (500th Anniversary of John Calvin)
- Geunjeong Order of Green Algebra in Korea (2018)
- Korean Evangelical Theological Society Theologian Awards (2018)

== See also ==
- Baekseok University
