= Mirae =

Mirae (In Korean, Future) may refer to:

- Daegu Mirae College, a private college located in Gyeongsan City, South Korea
- Mirae Asset, a securities and insurance company, headquartered in Seoul, South Korea
- Mirae caritatis, an encyclical of Pope Leo XIII on the Holy Eucharist given on 28 May 1902
- The Daewoo Mirae, a car unveiled on April 20, 1999, by Queen Elizabeth II
- Mirae (band), a South Korean boy group signed to DSP Media
- Mirae (Wi-Fi), a North Korean Wifi service
