= Hyejeon College =

Korean private college

Coordinates: 36.57971°N 126.65924°E

HYEJEON COLLEGE
- Type: Private
- Established: 1981; 45 years ago
- Location: Hongseong-Eup, South Chungcheong Province, South Korea
- Campus: Urban (Daejeon Campus)
- Website: www.hj.ac.kr

- Hyejeon College
- Hangul: 혜전대학교
- Hanja: 彗田大學校
- RR: Hyejeon daehakgyo
- MR: Hyejŏn taehakkyo

Hyejeon College is a private junior college in Hongseong-Eup, South Korea.

== See also ==
- List of colleges and universities in South Korea
- Education in South Korea
