= Asia University =

Asia University may refer to:

- Asia University (South Korea) (亞洲大學校), a private university located in Suwon, Gyunggi-do, South Korea
- Asia University (Japan) (亜細亜大学), a private university located in Musashino, Tokyo, Japan
- Asia University (Taiwan) (亞洲大學)
- Asia LIFE University, also known as Gospel Theological Seminary in Daejeon, Korea
- Asia Pacific University
- Asia e University, a multinational university in Malaysia
