= GYC =

GYC may stand for:

== Education ==
- Gangneung Yeongdong University, in Gangwon-do, South Korea
- Great Yarmouth College, in Norfolk, England
- Guilford Young College, in Hobart, Tasmania, Australia

== Other uses ==
- Gaur Yamuna City, Uttar Pradesh, India
- Generation of Youth for Christ, an Adventist movement
- Greenwich Yacht Club, in London
