= Anyang student murders =

Kidnappings and murders of two young girls in South Korea

Lee Hye-jin, 10 (left) and Wu Ye-seul, 8

The Anyang student murders refers to the kidnappings and subsequent murders of two young girls (Lee Hye-jin, 10; and Wu Ye-seul, 8), which occurred on Christmas Day 2007 in Anyang, South Korea. On March 11, 2008, Lee's body was found in the area of Chilbosan Mountain near Suwon, and four days later, the killer, 38-year-old Jeong Seong-hyeon, was arrested. He subsequently confessed to both murders, and indicated that he had buried Wu's body in Siheung, where it was later found by authorities. At his trial, Jeong was found guilty and sentenced to death, and is still awaiting his execution.

== Case ==
=== Disappearance ===
On December 25, 2007, the two girls were seen playing at a playground in Manan-gu with some friends, after they had finished their church services. At around 4:10 PM, they were seen on CCTV at an outdoor concert hall in front of the Anyang Literature Center, disappearing shortly after the owner of a small shop saw them exiting the center at around 5 o'clock.

On the next day, the girls' parents contacted the police, asking that they search for their missing children. When no clues were obtained, the local authorities announced a public investigation and issued an Amber alert. The initial reward of 20 million won was raised to 30 million, but even then, no viable tips came in, stalling the investigation. On March 6, 2008, Commissioner Eo Chung-soo ordered the case to be reopened.

=== Discovery of Lee Hye-jin's body ===
On March 11, a reserve officer training on the hillside near Suwon found a buried body, reporting the finding to police. The unearthed body was sent to the National Institute for Scientific Investigation, where it was determined that the corpse belonged to a young girl, aged 8 to 10 years old. Thinking that it might be a missing child, the coroners asked for a DNA analysis to be conducted, which conclusively proved that the body belonged to Lee Hye-jin.

In the meantime, the police learned that a local resident named Jeong Seong-hyeon, who lived by himself at about 130 meters away from Lee's home, had rented a 2003 Hyundai Sonata on the day the two children had disappeared, returning it the next day. When they examined the vehicle, a blood stain was found in the trunk. After examining it at the institute, authorities were informed that the blood matched the DNA of Lee and Wu.

=== Arrest ===
On March 16, 2008, Jeong was arrested at his mother's house in Anyang and taken to the police station. Initially, he stubbornly denied the accusations, and then claimed to have hidden the children's bodies in shame, after killing them in a traffic accident. However, when the police told him that no signs of a traffic accident were located at the scene, he finally confessed to kidnapping and killing both girls.

=== Discovery of Wu Ye-seul's body ===
Two days after Jeong's arrest, a soldier from the military intelligence unit found body parts under a waterway in Siheung. The girl's right arm first, with an additional left arm and right leg found in the following hours. After sending the remains for examination, the Institute determined that they indeed belonged to Wu.

== Jeong Seong-hyeon ==
Jeong Seong-hyeon
- Born: July 14, 1969 (age 57); Boryeong, South Korea
- Conviction: Murder x3
- Penalty: Death

Details
- Victims: 3
- Span of crimes: 2004–2007
- Country: South Korea
- State: Seoul Capital Area
- Date apprehended: March 16, 2008
- Imprisoned at: Seoul Detention Center, Uiwang

Born in 1969, Seong-hyeon grew up in a household with an alcoholic father who frequently beat him. Throughout his entire academic career, he was bullied and harassed by his peers, and thus frequently skipped class. As he entered his teenage years, all of his love interests eventually left him, leading him to develop a hatred and aversion towards women. Following his graduation from Daelim University College, where he earned a degree in computer science, he lived as a recluse in a self-catering room in Anyang. According to him, he decided to kill the girls, luring them under the pretense of showing them around the city, using his position as a church-goer to ease the children's fears.

While investigating his past, the police connected him to another killing: in July 2004, Seong-hyeon murdered 44-year-old karaoke assistant Chung Deok-soon in Gunpo, leaving the body at the crime scene. On June 18, 2008, Jeong was sentenced to death by the Suwon District Court for all three killings, which he tried to appeal to the High Court on October 17, which rejected it. He then tried to appeal his sentence to the Supreme Court, but in the following year, on February 26, 2009, the Supreme Court dismissed his case, confirming his death sentence for the lower courts.

== Other suspected murders ==
Following Jeong's arrest, he was investigated in five similar disappearances of women and young girls which had occurred in the area. On March 19, 2008, the body of a 30-year-old female was found in the Wangsong Reservoir in Uiwang. Her fingerprints had been removed and both of her hands tied, while the cause of death appeared to be strangulation. However, the authorities couldn't conclusively prove that Jeong was responsible for this crime.

== See also ==
- Lee Choon-jae
- List of serial killers by country
