= Kyungdong University =

Coordinates: 38°15′03″N 128°33′20″E

- Hangul: 경동대학교
- Hanja: 京東大學校
- RR: Gyeongdong daehakgyo
- MR: Kyŏngdong taehakkyo

Kyungdong University is a private University in northeastern South Korea. It has three campuses - metropol in Yangju City, medical in Wonju City and global in Goseong and Sokcho cities. About 245 instructors are employed. The current president is Seong-yong Chun (전성용).

== Academics ==
Undergraduate offerings are provided through five divisions: Humanities and Social Science, Food Science, IT, Tourism, Health and Nursing, and Education, which are separated into 3 Special Campuses and 33 departments.

== History ==
Its history can be traced back to 1981 when Sokcho Technical College (속초전문대학) was founded by Dr Chun Jae-wook. In 1983 it changed its name to Dong-U Technical College and in 1998 to Dong-U College. In 1997 Dr Chun founded a separate institution, Kyungdong University. In 2012 now-Ministry of Education granted merger of two institutions, Dong-U College and Kyungdong University, and the closure of Dong-U College.

== See also ==
- List of colleges and universities in South Korea
- Education in South Korea
