= Choonhae College of Health Sciences =

Technical college in Ulsan, South Korea

Coordinates: 35.458°N 129.196°E

- Hangul: 춘해보건대학교
- Hanja: 春海保健大學校
- RR: Chunhae bogeon daehakgyo
- MR: Ch'unhae pogŏn taehakkyo

Choonhae Health Sciences University (Korean: 춘해보건대학교) is a private technical college located in Ulsan, South Korea. The current president is Bok-yong Kim (김복영). Founded as a nursing school, the college continues to have a strong focus on medical studies, and also operates a hospital.

== Academics ==
The college's academic offerings are almost exclusively medicine-related, being provided by departments of Nursing, Counselling Psychology, Yoga, Social Welfare, Therapeutic Special Education for Children, and Computer Information Technology.

== History ==
The college was founded in 1968 as Choonhae Nursing School (춘해간호학교).

== Academic programs ==
| Four-year program | Three-year programs | Two-year programs |
|---|---|---|
| Nursing | Dental Hygiene; Occupational Therapy; Emergency Medical Services; Radiology; Physical Therapy; Speech-Language Pathology; Early Childhood Education | Health Administration; Optometry; Yoga; Social Welfare Care; Forestry & Landscape Business; Wellness Culture & Tourism; Global Care; Global Beauty; Lifelong Education & Counseling |

The university offers two-year and three-year associate degree programs, as well as four-year bachelor's degree programs in selected fields.

== See also ==
- List of colleges and universities in South Korea
- Education in South Korea
