= Daewon University College =

Technical college in South Korea

Coordinates: 37.1753°N 128.1923°E

- Hangul: 대원대학교
- Hanja: 大元大學校
- RR: Daewon daehakgyo
- MR: Taewŏn taehakkyo

Daewon University College (Korean: 대원대학교) is a private technical college in North Chungcheong province, South Korea. The campus is situated in Jecheon City. About 85 instructors are employed. Around 2,000 students are admitted every year.

== Academics ==
The academic offerings of Daewon University College are provided through the divisions of Engineering, Health & Social Affairs, Household Affairs, Humanities & Social Sciences, and Arts & Physical Education. The majority of offerings are through the division of Engineering, which includes fields such as automotive engineering and multimedia.

== History ==
The college was founded in 1995 as Daewon Junior College (대원전문대학). It took its current name in 1999.

== See also ==
- List of colleges and universities in South Korea
- Education in South Korea
