= Dong-pusan College =

1979–2020 university in South Korea

Coordinates: 35.23290°N 129.14802°E

Dong-Pusan College
- 동부산대학교
- Established: 1979; 47 years ago
- Location: Busan, South Korea

- Dong-pusan College
- Hangul: 동부산대학교
- Hanja: 東釜山大學校
- RR: Dongbusan daehakgyo
- MR: Tongbusan taehakkyo

Dong-Pusan College was a private technical college in Busan, a major city in South Korea. It employed about 65 instructors. In August 2020 Ministry of Education ordered the closure of the university due to its significant financial troubles and corruption of the founders. It is officially closed in the following month.

== Academics ==
The college offers technical instruction in the fields of business, tourism, computers, design, welfare and childhood, and health.

== History ==
The college opened in 1979 as Dongnae Girls' College (동래여자전문대학). It became coeducational in 1996 and adopted its current name in 1998.

== Sister schools ==
The college maintains international exchange ties with three institutions: Russia's Novosibirsk Conservatory, Australia's University of Tasmania, and Japan's Beppu University.

== See also ==
- List of colleges and universities in South Korea
- Education in South Korea
