= Youngsan University of Son Studies =

Buddhist university in South Korea

Coordinates: 35°19′33″N 126°26′27″E

- Hangul: 영산선학대학교
- Hanja: 靈山禪學大學校
- RR: Yeongsan seonhak daehakgyo
- MR: Yŏngsan sŏnhak taehakkyo

Youngsan University of Seonstudies is a private religious university located in Yeonggwang County, South Jeolla province, South Korea. It offers graduate and undergraduate training in Won Buddhism and related matters.

== History ==
The predecessor of the university was founded on April 1, 1927, as Youngsan Hagwon (영산학원/靈山學院), a private academy for training Won Buddhist clergy. It closed down for three years at the end of World War II, from 1944 to 1947, and again during the Korean War from 1950 to 1952. It closed down once again in 1957, to be reopened as a religious school recognized by the government in 1964. 1964 is thus recognized by some as the date of the school's actual founding. The school became a college in 1986, and a university in 1997.

== See also ==
- List of colleges and universities in South Korea
- Education in South Korea
