= Daejeon Health Sciences College =

Technical college in Daejeon, South Korea

Coordinates: 36.350°N 127.455°E

- Established: 1977
- President: Chung Moo-nam
- Location: 77-3 Gayang2-Dong, Dong-Gu, Daejeon, 300-711 Daejeon, Korea, Daejeon, Daejeon, Republic of Korea
- Campus: Urban(Daejeon Campus)
- Website: www.hit.ac.kr

- Daejeon Health Sciences College
- Hangul: 대전보건대학교
- Hanja: 大田保健大學校
- RR: Daejeon bogeon daehakgyo
- MR: Taejŏn pogŏn taehakkyo

Daejeon Health Sciences College (Korean: 대전보건대학교) is a technical college providing training in the health sciences in South Korea. It is located in the Dong-gu district of Daejeon. The college carries a maximum enrollment of about 3,700. The current president is Lee Gang-o (이강오).

== History ==
The school began as Daejeon Technical School of Health (대전보건전문학교) in 1978, and gained technical-college status later the same year. Its present name was adopted in 1998.

== Sister schools ==
The college's sister schools include New South Wales University's optics department, and South Baylor University.

== See also ==
- List of colleges and universities in South Korea
- Education in South Korea
