= Luther University =

University in Yongin, South Korea

Coordinates: 37.2653°N 127.1132°E

- 루터대학교
- Type: Private
- Established: 1966
- President: Kwon, Deok-chil
- Faculty: 21 (2017)
- Administrative staff: 24 (2017)
- Undergraduates: 381 (2017)
- Postgraduates: 35 (2017)
- Location: Yongin, Gyeonggi-do, South Korea
- Website: www.ltu.ac.kr

- Luther University
- Hangul: 루터대학교
- Hanja: 루터大學校
- RR: Ruteo daehakgyo
- MR: Rut'ŏ taehakkyo

Luther University (Korean: 루터대학교) is a private university in Giheung-gu, Yongin, South Korea.

== History ==
As part of the efforts to become a fully operational church and functioning place of training, Luther Theological Academy (LTA) was established in 1966 by Rev. Dr. Won-Yong Ji (1924-2012). This laid the foundation for what would later become Luther Theological University and is currently referred to as Luther University or commonly called "LTU". The LTU journey unfolded thus:

- Luther Academy on March 5, 1966
- Renamed Luther Seminary on November 17, 1980
- Luther Seminary opened on March 1, 1984
- Designated a four-year, academic school on January 18, 1986
- Reorganized as Luther Theological University on December 5, 1997
- Changed name to Luther University on June 19, 2003

Recent Challenges

Beginning in 2010, the school started to face challenges. This was especially related to the ability of the university to issue loans. The official designation became known as a "School of Education, Science and Technology, student loan restriction college. It was recognized as one of the top 30 schools to have this particular designation. In 2015, an evaluation by the Ministry of Education rated the university in the lowest E group, resulting in the Ministry halting its monetary support and barring the University from all state-funded programs.

== Nearby Locations, Education Facilities ==
- Nam June Paik Art Center
- Gyeonggi-do Museum
- Gyeonggi-do Children's Museum
- Sangal Station
- GiHeung Station (Nam June Paik Art Center)\
- Sanggal Elementary School
- Bora Elementary School
- Singal High School
