= Yong-in Songdam College =

Coordinates: 37°13′43″N 127°13′06″E

- Hangul: 용인예술과학대학교
- Hanja: 龍仁藝術科學大學校
- RR: Yongin yesul gwahak daehakgyo
- MR: Yongin yesul kwahak taehakkyo

Yong-In Arts & Science University is a private technical college in Yongin City, Gyeonggi province, South Korea. It employs about 100 instructors. Most courses of study are related to computers or digital technology.

== History ==
The college was founded in 1995. Its president was Choi Yeong-cheol (최영철), who continues to serve in that capacity.

On July 1, 2021, the name was changed to the current "Yong-In Arts & Science University".

== Sister schools ==
Yong-In Arts & Science University maintains international sisterhood relations with three American institutions (Madonna University, the Community Colleges for International Development, Kapiʻolani Community College), three Russian institutions (the State University of Management, Institute of World Economy and International Relations, Moscow State University of Industrial and Applied Arts), and one Canadian institution (St. Clair College).

== See also ==
- List of colleges and universities in South Korea
- Education in South Korea
