= Hanyeong College =

Coordinates: 34.754°N 127.715°E

- 한영대학 (漢永大學)
- Type: Private
- Established: 1992
- Location: Yeosu, South Jeolla, South Korea
- Website: Official website

Korean name
- Hangul: 한영대학
- Hanja: 漢永大學
- RR: Hanyeong daehak
- MR: Hanyŏng taehak

Hanyeong College (Korean: 한영대학; Hanja: 漢永大學) is a private college located in Yeosu, Jeollanam-do established in 1992 with the School of Constitutional Conscription. On March 9, 1993, 480 freshmen from 6 departments and schools entered Hanyeong Technical College. In 1995, 242 students made up the first graduating class. In 1998, Hanyeong Technical College changed its name to Yeosu Technical College and was renamed Hanyeong College as of 2002.

== See also ==
- List of universities and colleges in South Korea
