= Cheju Tourism College =

Private technical college in South Korea

Cheju Tourism University
- Type: Private
- Established: 1993
- President: Kim Chang-hui
- Faculty: 66
- Location: Jeju, South Korea; 33.44845°N 126.43480°E
- Campus: Rural
- Website: http://www.cjtour.ac.kr/

- Cheju Tourism College
- Hangul: 제주관광대학교
- Hanja: 濟州觀光大學校
- RR: Jeju gwangwang daehakgyo
- MR: Cheju kwan'gwang taehakkyo

Cheju Tourism College is a private technical college on South Korea's Jeju island. It offers education in various fields related to tourism, an important sector of the local economy. The current president is Kim Chang-hui (김창희).

Unlike most institutions of higher learning on Jeju island, the college campus is located in a relatively rural area, Bukjeju County. About 66 instructors are employed on the campus.

== Academics ==
The school's academic offerings cover a diverse range of technical fields. Among these are computer applications for tourism, sports and leisure studies, and casino and hotel management.

== History ==
The school was opened in 1993, as Jeju Tourism Technical College (제주관광전문대학). It adopted its current name in 1998.

== Sister schools ==
The college maintains sisterhood ties with colleges and universities in four countries. The first such links were forged with universities in America and Australia: Ashland University in 1993, and the University of Western Sydney in 1995. More recently, the school has focused on developing ties with universities in Japan and China. Links now exist with Japan's Osaka Seikei College, Shobi Academy, Meikai University, and Suzuka International University, as well as with China's Ningbo University, Tianjin Normal College, and Tianjin University of Finance and Economics.

== See also ==
- List of colleges and universities in South Korea
- Education in South Korea
