= Baekseok Culture University =

- Type: Private
- Established: 1994
- President: Kwang-Jae Huh
- Administrative staff: 110
- Location: Cheonan, South Chungcheong, South Korea; 36.83780°N 127.18246°E
- Website: http://www.bscu.ac.kr/

- Baekseok Culture University
- Hangul: 백석문화대학
- Hanja: 白石文化大學
- RR: Baekseok munhwa daehak
- MR: Paeksŏk munhwa taehak

Baekseok Culture University, formerly Cheonan College of Foreign Studies, is a Christian private college located in the city center of Cheonan, a major city of South Chungcheong province in western South Korea. It employs about 110 instructors.

== Academics ==
The college's offerings focus heavily on language training, and include English, Japanese, Chinese, and Russian, as well as related fields such as tourism interpretation and international business. In addition, a number of government-supported continuing education programs are offered.

== History ==
The school opened as Cheonan College of Foreign Studies in 1994, established by the Baekseok Educational Foundation. The first president was Jang Jong-hyun (장종현). The current president (the college's third), Kwang-Jae Huh (허광재), took office in 2003. The school name was originally known as Cheonan Junior College of Foreign Studies when it was opened in 1994. The first name amendment was made in May 1998, and was changed to the current version in 2004.

== Sister schools ==
Sisterhood ties exist with universities in countries where each of the college's offered languages is spoken. These include Tianjin Foreign Studies University and Beijing Language and Culture University in China, Nagasaki University of Foreign Studies in Japan, Irkutsk National University of Education in Russia. The English-speaking world is represented by Central Michigan University in the United States, and by three Australian institutions: the International College of Hotel Management, the St Aloysius Adelaide Language Centre, and Tabor College Adelaide.

== See also ==
- List of colleges and universities in South Korea
- Education in South Korea
