= Daegu Health College =

College in Daegu metropolitan city, South Korea

Coordinates: 35.9274°N 128.5436°E

- Hangul: 대구보건대학
- Hanja: 大邱保健大學
- RR: Daegu bogeon daehak
- MR: Taegu pogŏn taehak

Daegu Health College provides medical training to aspiring professionals in Daegu metropolitan city, South Korea. The current president is Nam Seong-hui (남성희). About 100 instructors are employed.

== Academics ==
The courses of study are divided among five divisions: Health (which includes fields such as clinical pathology and radiology), Nursing, Medical Industry, Social Work, and Arts.

== History ==
The college opened as Daegu Technical School of Health (대구보건전문학교) in 1971. Its status was raised to that of a technical college in 1979, and in 1998 it became simply Daegu Health College.

== See also ==
- List of colleges and universities in South Korea
- Education in South Korea
