= Gangdong University =

Private university in Eumseong, South Korea

- 강동대학교
- Motto: Sincerity, Creativity, Cooperation 성실, 창조, 협동
- Type: Private
- Established: 1994
- President: Ms. Ryu Yeong-yun 류정윤
- Academic staff: 336
- Students: 4,665
- Location: Eumseong County, North Chungcheong, South Korea
- Campus: Rural (Chungju Campus)
- Website: www.gangdong.ac.kr (in Korean)

Korean name
- Hangul: 강동대학교
- Hanja: 江東大學校
- RR: Gangdong daehakgyo
- MR: Kangdong taehakkyo

Gangdong University (Korean: 강동대학교) is a private university located in Eumseong County, North Chungcheong Province, South Korea. The school has 59 professors and more than 4,000 students.

== Timeline ==
- 11 June 1991: Founded Sunghui Academy Foundation
- 5 March 1994: The school was founded as Chungbuk College
- 1 March 1997: The school changed the name to Far East College
- 7 June 2011: Changed the name to Gangdong University
- 11 March 2014: Completed Art Museum

== Campus ==
The campus located near Chungju City.

== Department ==
The school has 26 department:

== See also ==
- Education in South Korea
- List of colleges and universities in South Korea
