= Cheju Halla University =

Private university in Jeju City, South Korea

- Type: Private
- Established: 1966
- Location: Jeju City, Jeju-do, South Korea; 33.47616°N 126.47560°E
- Website: chu.ac.kr/main/main/index.php

- Cheju Halla University
- Hangul: 제주한라대학교
- Hanja: 濟州漢拏大學校
- RR: Jeju Halla daehakgyo
- MR: Cheju Halla taehakkyo

Cheju Halla University is a private university in Jeju City, the principal city of South Korea's island province of Jeju Province. Originally established as a nursing school, it retains a strong emphasis on medicine, although academic programs in many other fields are now offered.

== History ==
The school began its existence in 1966 as Jeju Nursing School (제주간호학교), a three-year technical institution. It became Jeju Technical College of Nursing in 1979, Halla Technical College in 1991, and took on its present name in 1998.

== See also ==
- List of colleges and universities in South Korea
- Education in South Korea
