= Yeungnam University College =

University College in South Korea

Coordinates: 35.847°N 128.586°E

- Hangul: 영남이공대학
- Hanja: 嶺南理工大學
- RR: Yeongnam igong daehak
- MR: Yŏngnam igong taehak

Yeungnam University College is a technical college located in Nam-gu, Daegu, South Korea. It offers two-, three-, and four- year degree programs in a variety of technical fields, including those of computers, information technology, and industrial machinery. As of 2004, the student body numbers about 5,000 students. About 20% of those students are full-time workers who study at night.

== History ==
Yeungnam University College was founded as a technical high school attached to Yeungnam University in 1968, during the presidency of Park Chung Hee. It was designated a college in 1979. Enrollment has risen dramatically over the years; the first graduating class in 1970 numbered 68, while the class of 2004 numbered 1,818.

== Sister colleges ==
Yeungnam maintains sisterhood relationships with various institutions around the world. These include Taiwan's Taipei Institute of Technology, America's Lewis & Clark College, Canada's Southern Alberta Institute of Technology, Australia's Central Queensland University and Royal Melbourne Institute of Technology, Japan's Osaka Industrial College and Nagasaki Science College, the Philippines' University of Santo Tomas, and China's Shenyang University of Technology.

== See also ==
- List of colleges and universities in South Korea
- Education in South Korea

The college currently offers a dual Diploma with Canada's British Columbia Institute of Technology (BCIT) https://www.bcit.ca.
