= Daegu Future College =

South Korean private college

Coordinates: 35.81060°N 128.76732°E

- Hangul: 대구미래대학교
- Hanja: 大邱未來大學校
- RR: Daegu mirae daehakgyo
- MR: Taegu mirae taehakkyo

Daegu Mirae College (Korean: 대구미래대학교) was a private college located in Gyeongsan City, South Korea, which neighbors the metropolitan city of Daegu. About 80 instructors were employed. In January 2018 Ministry of Education granted its voluntary closure which it filed for financial difficulties after receiving the lowest grade in Ministry's evaluation several times. It officially closed in the following month.

== Academics ==
The college's academic offerings are offered through departments arranged under the divisions of Humanities and Safety, Natural Science, Engineering, and Arts and Physical Education.

== History ==
The college opened its doors in 1981 as Daeil Industrial Technical College (대일실업전문대학). It took its current name in 1998.

== Sister schools ==
The college has international ties with America's Hawaii Pacific University and France's Paris American Academy.

== See also ==
- List of colleges and universities in South Korea
- Education in South Korea
