= Christian College of Nursing =

Nursing school in Gwangju, South Korea

- 기독간호대학교
- Location: Gwangju, South Korea; 35.13849°N 126.91602°E
- Website: www.ccn.ac.kr

- Christian College of Nursing
- Hangul: 기독간호대학교
- Hanja: 基督看護大學校
- RR: Gidok ganho daehakgyo
- MR: Kidok kanho taehakkyo

Christian College of Nursing (Korean: 기독간호대학교) is a South Korean technical college specialized in training for the nursing profession. The campus is located in the country's southwest, in the metropolitan city of Gwangju. The current president is Myeung-sook Koh. It enrolls about 360 students and is affiliated with the Gwangju Christian Hospital.

== Academics ==
All of the college's academic offerings are related to nursing.

== History ==
The college first opened its doors in 1967 as Supia Nursing School (수피아간호학교) with an entering class of 40 students. The college took its present name in 1998.

== See also ==
- List of colleges and universities in South Korea
- Education in South Korea
