= Yaeil Theological Seminary =

Korean graduate school

Yemyung Graduate University
- Type: Private
- Established: 1999
- President: Myung-Bhum Johannes Lee
- Academic staff: 24
- Administrative staff: 56
- Students: 540
- Postgraduates: 380
- Doctoral students: 160
- Location: Seoul, South Korea
- Website: www.ygu.ac.kr

Korean name
- Hangul: 예명대학원대학교
- Hanja: 예명大學院大學校
- RR: Yemyeong daehagwon daehakgyo
- MR: Yemyŏng taehagwŏn taehakkyo

Yemyung Graduate University is a private graduate school located in Seocho-gu district, in Seoul, South Korea.

== See also ==
- List of colleges and universities in South Korea
- List of colleges and universities
- Education in South Korea
