= Asia LIFE University =

Christian university in Daejeon, South Korea

- Former names: Korea Foursquare Bible College, Gospel Theological Seminary
- Type: Private
- Established: 1972; 54 years ago
- Religious affiliation: The Foursquare Church in Korea
- President: Yongnan Ahn Jeon
- Location: 40, Dongseo-daero 1327beon-gil, Jung-gu, Daejeon, South Korea; 36.33185°N 127.40627°E
- Campus: Urban(Daejeon campus)
- Website: www.alu.ac.kr (in Korean)

- Asia LIFE University
- Hangul: 건신대학원대학교
- RR: Geonsin daehagwon daehakgyo
- MR: Kŏnsin taehagwŏn taehakkyo

Asia LIFE University (ALU), also known as Gospel Theological Seminary, is a Christian university in Daejeon, Korea.

Asia LIFE University is based on the foundations of the Pentecostal and evangelical theology with emphasis on the Four Square Gospel of salvation, Spirit-baptism, healing and return of Christ. Gospel Theological Seminary, as it was known before, strives to educate Christian leaders who are dedicated to the evangelical ministry.

The ALU is affiliated with the Foursquare Church in Korea. It is also a member of the Korea Association of Accredited Theological Schools and the Asia Theological Association.

== History ==
Asia LIFE University was founded in 1972 as the Korea Foursquare Bible College. In December 1997, the Ministry of Education approved Korea Foursquare Bible College to become a theological seminary. The Gospel Theological Seminary opened on March 12, 1998, starting with 50 students studying for their Master of Divinity. On March 1, 2015, it changed its name from the Gospel Theological Seminary to Asia LIFE University.

== Religious objectives ==
- To train people to be competent and experienced as faithful Christian leaders whose doctrine is rooted in the Pentecostal theology.
- To train people to be leaders who seek to live out the Word under the Lordship of Jesus Christ.
- To train people to be talented as international Christian leaders who take the leadership of the world missions with the help of an education. An education that allows theological exchanges worldwide with lectures conducted in English and Korean.
- To teach individuals how to manage small groups.
- To train people to be theologists and leaders who are committed, and contribute themselves, to the development of theology and knowledge.

== Areas of study ==
- Spiritual Theology
- Biblical Theology (Old Testament/New Testament)
- Missiology
- Systematic Theology
- Historical Theology
- Practical Theology
- Pastoral Counseling

== See also ==
- List of colleges and universities in South Korea
- Education in South Korea
