= Ajou Motor College =

Coordinates: 36.4036°N 126.5793°E

- Hangul: 아주자동차대학
- Hanja: 亞洲自動車大學
- RR: Aju jadongcha daehak
- MR: Aju chadongch'a taehak

Ajou Motor College, formerly Daecheon College, is a private technical college in Boryeong, near the seacoast of South Chungcheong province, South Korea. It employs about 100 instructors. The president is Pyongwan Park.

== Academics ==
Academic offerings are divided between the division of Automotive Machinery and that of Internet Information (which also includes departments such as cuisine and leisure studies).

== History ==
The college opened in 1995 as Daecheon Technical College (대천전문대학). It was established by the Daewoo Educational Foundation, which is affiliated with the Daewoo conglomerate. At the time, training was provided for about 400 students in automotive and electronic fields. The current school name was adopted in September 2004.

- 1997: Daewoo Academy was founded
- 1991: Establishment of Daecheon Technical College approved
- 1995: First matriculation ceremony
- 1996: Completed the construction of the automobile production practice area (720m²) and the dormitory (3,170m²)
- 1997: Completed the construction of Automobile Practice Building A (720m²), Automobile Practice Building B (1,040m²), and Student Welfare Building (291m²). Selected as an excellent engineering college and appointed as a college specialized in the automotive production and technology by the Ministry of Education, Science and Technology. Appointed as a trail college for connection operation of the 2+2 curriculum by the Ministry of Education, Science and Technology
- 1998: Selected as an excellent college by the College General Assessment conducted by the Ministry of Education, Science and Technology
- 1999: Construction of the Common Practice of Automotive Production Technology and Research Center (3,488m²) completed
- 2001: Appointed as Business Incubator Center by the Small and Medium Business Administration
- 2002: Designated as a certified institute for the British national technical certification, the VRQs3
- 2003: Established the College of Mold in the Bucheon Techno Park Industrial Complex under the agreement between the Bucheon Mold Association and Daecheon College
- 2004: Changed the school name to Ajou Motor College
- 2005: Opened an educational training center in Australia
- 2006: Completed the construction of the practice area for car frame repair (3,293m²)
- 2009: Selected for the fostering project of the academic-industrial cooperation-oriented college
- 2010: Completed the sports complex with artificial grass (8,699m²). Selected for the college brand project conducted by the Ministry of Education, Science and Technology (automobile field)
- 2011: Selected as a college with excellent educational capacity by the Ministry of Education, Science and Technology. Selected for the college brand project for two consecutive years conducted by the Ministry of Education, Science and Technology (automobile field). Selected as a leading college for fostering customized human resources for small and medium-sized companies conducted by the Small and Medium Business Administration. Signed an agreement of exchange program with Ajou University
- 2012: Certified college of educational quality by the College General Assessment of the Ministry of Education, Science and Technology

== See also ==
- Education in South Korea
- List of colleges and universities in South Korea
