= ACTS University =

South Korean Christian college

Coordinates: 37.51104°N 127.42759°E

- Type: Private Christian evangelical
- Established: 1968
- President: Dr. Hung Ho Chong
- Location: Yangpyeong, Gyeonggi, South Korea
- Website: english.acts.ac.kr

- ACTS University
- Hangul: 아신대학교
- Hanja: 亞神大學校
- RR: Asin daehakgyo
- MR: Asin taehakkyo

ACTS University (ACTS abbreviated from Asian Center for Theological Studies and Mission) is an interdenominational evangelical Christian school in South Korea. It has two primary campuses: the smaller original location in Seoul, a larger new campus in Yangpyeong County, east of Seoul in central Gyeonggi province. It hosts undergraduate and graduate programs on a number of campuses.

== History ==
The school traces its roots to an evangelical conference in Singapore in 1968. The campus was opened in Seoul's Seodaemun-gu on May 1, 1974, with six students. At that time it existed only as the Asia Center for Theological Studies and Mission; it received permission to form an educational corporation in 1981, at which time the formal entity of Asia United Theological College was established. Shortly thereafter the Yangpyeong campus was acquired. The college became a university in 1993.

== See also ==
- List of colleges and universities in South Korea
- Education in South Korea
- Christianity in Korea
