= Changshin University =

Christian university in Changwon, South Korea

- Type: Private
- Established: 1991
- Administrative staff: 60
- Students: 2,000
- Location: Changwon City, South Gyeongsang, South Korea; 35.24422°N 128.59960°E
- Website: www.cs.ac.kr

- Changshin University
- Hangul: 창신대학교
- Hanja: 昌信大學校
- RR: Changsin daehakgyo
- MR: Ch'angsin taehakkyo

Changshin University (Korean: 창신대학교) is a private Christian university located in Changwon City, South Gyeongsang province, near the southern coast of South Korea. It employs about 60 instructors on two campuses. Graduating classes number around 2,000.

== Academics ==
The school's academic departments are divided into four divisions: engineering, artistic training, social science, and natural science.

== History ==
The school opened as Chang Shin Technical College (창신전문대학) in 1991, with a legal maximum intake of 480. The second campus was opened in 2003. It was acquired by Booyoung Group on August 1, 2019. In 2020 it offered freshman full one year scholarships to attract students in a period with falling enrollment numbers.

== Sister schools ==
The college's first international sisterhood relationship was established in 1993 with Germany's Berlin University of Applied Science and Technology. Since then, additional relationships have been forged with China's Minzu University and Yanbian University of Science and Technology, America's Illinois State University and Biola University, the Philippine University of the Philippines, Yugoslavia's Megatrend University, Russia's Amur State University, Switzerland's Winterthur University, and Australia's University of Newcastle. At any given time, between 30 and 40 students from Changshin University are studying at these institutions, and a similar number of foreign students are studying at Chang Shin.

== See also ==
- List of colleges and universities in South Korea
- Education in South Korea
