= Baewha Women's University =

Private university in Seoul, South Korea

- 배화여자대학교
- Location: Seoul, South Korea; 36.84021°N 127.18322°E

- Baewha Women's University
- Hangul: 배화여자대학교
- Hanja: 培花女子大學校
- RR: Baehwa yeoja daehakgyo
- MR: Paehwa yŏja taehakkyo

Baewha Women's University is a private Christian university located in Jongno-gu, Seoul, South Korea. Enrollment fluctuates around 1,350, and is restricted to women. Courses of study are offered in interpretation (English, Japanese and Chinese), traditional cuisine, clothing, business management, secretarial studies, e-commerce, nutrition, early childhood education, and applied information processing.

== History ==
The school was founded by the Baewha Educational Foundation, in 1977. The foundation's roots are much older, however; it was established in 1898 by the American Methodist missionary Josephine Eaton Peel Campbell.

== See also ==
- Education in South Korea
- List of colleges and universities in South Korea
