= Chung Cheong University =

Technical university in Cheongju, South Korea

- Location: Cheongju, South Korea; 36.61986°N 127.36839°E
- Website: ok.ac.kr

- Chung Cheong University
- Hangul: 충청대학
- Hanja: 忠淸大學
- RR: Chungcheong daehak
- MR: Ch'ungch'ŏng taehak

Chung Cheong University (Korean: 충청대학) is a private technical university in Cheongju City, the capital of North Chungcheong province, South Korea. It employs about 150 instructors and has approximately 5000 students enrolled. The current president is Yu Sun Gyu (유선규).

== Academics ==
The university's offerings are divided among the following departments: Architectural Engineering; Interior Design; Fashion Design; Information Technology; Bio-chemical, Mechanical, Civil, Electrical and Semi-conductor Engineering; Mechatronics; Automotive and Avionic Engineering; Urban Planning; Food and Drug Analysis; Food Nutrition and Catering; Quality & Safety Engineering; Tourism; Business & Public Administration; Early Childhood Education; Social Welfare; Foreign Languages (English, Japanese and Chinese); Physical Education; Nursing; Dental Hygiene and Media Studies.

== History ==
The university was opened in 1983 as "Chung Cheong Business and Industry College" (충청실업전문대학); however, the construction of the campus began two years before.

== Sister schools ==
Chung Cheong University maintains a sisterhood relationship with North China Electric Power University, which has campuses in Beijing and Baoding.

== See also ==
- List of colleges and universities in South Korea
- Education in South Korea
