= Open Cyber University of Korea =

- 한국열린사이버대학교
- Motto: 인본주의
- Motto in English: Humanism
- Type: Private
- Established: 1997
- Founders: OCU Consortium
- President: Jang, Il-hong
- Undergraduates: 4,810 (2018)
- Location: Jungnang District, Seoul, South Korea
- Website: www.ocu.ac.kr

Open Cyber University (OCU) is a consortium of Korean universities. It was founded in 1997 and is considered as the largest Korean academic exchange university as of 2012 with 35 member universities. The organization is authorized by South Korea's Ministry of Education to offer bachelor's degree in various fields of industry. It offers courses for subjects such as World English.
