= Gwangju Health University =

South Korean community college

Coordinates: 35.19155°N 126.84530°E

- 광주보건대학교
- Veritas Pax Libertas: Gwangju Health University
- Motto: 믿음으로 승리하는 대학
- Motto in English: Find Your Future at GHU; High Five with GHU
- Type: Private
- Established: 1972
- President: Chung, Myung Jin
- Location: Gwangsan District, Gwangju, South Jeolla Province, South Korea
- Website: ghueng.ivyro.net/main.php
- World Class College (since 2013) Specialized College of Korea (since 2014)

- Gwangju Health University
- Hangul: 광주보건대학교
- Hanja: 光州保建大學校
- RR: Gwangju bogeon daehakgyo
- MR: Kwangju pogŏn taehakkyo

Gwangju Health University (GHU) is a private bachelor's degree-granting community college located in Gwangju, South Korea. Established in 1972, GHU, has received national accreditation by the Ministry of Education as a World Class College in 2013, rated "Level A" for Structure Reformation Evaluation in 2016, and rated "Level S" for Specialized Education since 2015. There are over 4,000 students attending one of fourteen academic programs on campus. The academic programs at GHU focus on humanities and social sciences and the natural sciences. Various 2-year associate degree programs, 3-year associate degree programs, 4-year bachelor's degree program, and intensive study programs for a bachelor's degree (전공심화과정) are offered at GHU.

== GHU Accreditation ==
2018 University Reform and Institutional Autonomy by the Ministry of Education (South Korea)

2017 University Reform and Institutional Autonomy by the Ministry of Education

2016 Level A rating for Structure Reformation Evaluation by the Ministry of Education

2015 Level S rating for Specialized Education by the Ministry of Education

2013 World Class College rating by the Ministry of Education

== GHU Milestones ==
2016 GHU was awarded the highest recognition for being a Specialized College of Korea by the Ministry of Education.

2015 GHU was evaluated as "Grade A" by the Ministry of Education for its structural organization.

2015 GHU was awarded the highest recognition for being a Specialized College by the Ministry of Education.

2014 GHU was selected to run a Foreign Language School for the Summer Universiade Gwangju 2015.

2013 GHU was evaluated with the highest marks for Teacher Education Evaluation Systems by the Ministry of Education.

2011 GHU changed its name to Gwangju Health University.

2010 GHU was awarded "Excellence" in Higher Education Capability Enhancement Projects by the Korean Council for College Education.

2006 GHU was recognized for its Customized Education Support Projects by the Ministry of Education.

2005 GHU was recognized for its Customized Education Support Projects by the Ministry of Education.

2000 GHU was recognized for Excellence in its Specialization Programs by the Ministry of Education.

1971 GHU was given approval from the government to establish itself as the Speer Women's Technical School.

== Academics ==
Two-Year associate degree Program in Humanities and Social Sciences

- Department of Social Welfare

Two-Year associate degree Programs in the Natural Sciences

- Department of Food & Nutrition
- Department of Skin Care & Beauty

Three-Year associate degree Program in Humanities and Social Sciences

- Department of Early Childhood Education

Three-Year associate degree Programs in the Natural Sciences

- Department of Clinical Pathology
- Department of Dental Hygiene
- Department of Physical Therapy
- Department of Radiological Technology
- Department of Dental Laboratory Technology
- Department of Ophthalmic Optics
- Department of Emergency Medical Technology
- Department of Health Administration
- Department of Hospital Information Management

Four-Year bachelor's degree Program in the Natural Sciences

- Department of Nursing

Intensive Study Programs for bachelor's degree

- Department of Clinical Pathology
- Department of Dental Hygiene
- Department of Physical Therapy
- Department of Radiological Technology
- Department of Dental Laboratory Technology
- Department of Ophthalmic Optics
- Department of Emergency Medical Technology
- Department of Early Childhood Education

== GHU Facilities ==
GHU has a multifunctional residence hall, Samuel Student Residence Hall, which can provide housing for 600 students including international students. GHU has two on-campus coffee shops. GHU has a large athletic field.

== GHU Office of Global Affairs Programs ==
- GHU Pioneer: 2-week overseas volunteer program e.g., Mongolia, the Philippines and Cambodia
- Global Language Program: 6 week on-campus English conversation and/or TOEIC-based classes
- TOEIC Camp: 4-week full-time intensive TOEIC-based classes during summer break
- Overseas Language Training: 4 weeks of English language training overseas e.g., the Philippines, Ireland and Australia
- GHU Global Field Study: 16 week overseas English language training and workplace internship e.g., the US, Australia and Ireland

== See also ==
- List of colleges and universities in South Korea
- Education in South Korea
