= Catholic University of Pusan =

University in South Korea

Coordinates: 35°14′41.60″N 129°05′49.93″E

Catholic University of Pusan (CUP)
- 부산가톨릭대학교
- Established: 1964; 62 years ago
- President: Yoon Kyoung Chul
- Students: 1,200
- Location: Busan, South Korea
- Website: https://www.cup.ac.kr (Korean)

Korean name
- Hangul: 부산가톨릭대학교
- Hanja: 釜山가톨릭大學校
- Revised Romanization: Busan Gatollik Daehakgyo
- McCune–Reischauer: Pusan Kat'ollik Taehakkyo

The Catholic University of Pusan is situated in the southeastern South Korean port city of Busan. The current president is Son Sam-seok. The university is traditionally focused on nursing and health sciences, but in addition to these fields it includes schools of environmental science, business administration, computer information engineering, and social welfare. It enrolls about 1,200 students.

== History ==
In 1964, the Maryknoll School of Nursing opened under the directorship of Rita Catherine Bonin, attached to Maryknoll Sisters Hospital. It was reorganized as Maryknoll Nursing Junior College in 1971. It was renamed Pusan Catholic College in 1990. In 1999, it united with Jisan College (est. 1979), another Catholic nursing school in Busan, to form the present-day entity of the Catholic University of Pusan.

== An Organization of Education Topics ==
=== An ideology ===
Humanitarianism - Spirit of Catholicism/trust, love, service

=== Topic ===
An Honest volunteer (worker) for one person

== Introduce of Department in Cup ==
We have 6 main departments and 17 majors in our school

- College of Theology (신학대학)
- College of Nursing (간호대학)
- College of Health Sciences (보건과학대학)
- College of Applied Sciences (응용과학대학)
- College of Social Sciences (사회과학대학)
- The Faculty of Management
- The Faculty of Circulation Management Information
- The Faculty of Social Welfare
- College of Humanity Culture (인성교양부)

== See also ==
- List of colleges and universities in South Korea
- Education in South Korea
