= Donga College of Health =

College in Yeongam, South Korea

- Hangul: 동아보건대학교
- Hanja: 東亞保健大學校
- RR: Donga bogeon daehakgyo
- MR: Tonga pogŏn taehakkyo

Donga College of Health (Korean: 동아보건대학교) is a privately owned secondary education college in Yeongam County, South Jeolla province, South Korea. As of 2014 the president is Kim Kyung-Taik (김경택). More than 50 professors are providing education in Nursing, Social Welfare, Emergency Medical, Early Child Education, Occupational Therapy and Companion Animal Welfare fields. More than 10,000 students have graduated over 20 years since 1996.

== Academics ==
Donga College of Health provides a wide range of expertise including Nursing, Social Welfare, Emergency Medical, Early Child Education, Occupational Therapy and Companion Animal Welfare. The college is known to have begun its courses in Animal Welfare and Magic for the first time in the country.

== History ==
1994 March 11: The college is founded as Dong-A College (동아전문대학).

1996 February 12: 303 students graduated from the college.

1999 May 01: Appointed as excellent specialised college.

2000 June 07: Appointed and granted as specialised college by the Ministry of Education.

2002 March 01: Emergency Medical course is opened.

2004 March 01: Magic major course is opened.

2006 June 01: Appointed and granted (for 2007 and 2008) as "Animal Welfare Industry focused education valley".

2009 July 29: Approved to open a Nursing major 3-year course.

2013 February 02: Approved to open a Nursing major 4-year course.

2015 July 22: Appointed as Life-Long learning focused college by the Ministry of Education.

2016 March 01: Approved to change the name of the college to Donga College of Health (동아보건대학교).

== See also ==
- List of colleges and universities in South Korea
- Education in South Korea
