= Korea Polytechnic VII Busan =

Busan Polytechnic College
- 부산기능대학
- Type: Private
- Established: 1995; 31 years ago
- President: Jo Yong-ho
- Students: 920
- Location: Busan, South Korea
- Website: http://www.bpc.ac.kr

- Korea Polytechnic VII Busan
- Hangul: 부산기능대학
- Hanja: 釜山機能大學
- RR: Busan gineung daehak
- MR: Pusan kinŭng taehak

Busan Polytechnic College, formerly Busan IT Polytechnic College, is a private two-year technical college in southeastern South Korea. The campus is situated in the Buk-gu district of Busan Metropolitan City. The school's current president is Jo Yong-ho (조용호). The official maximum enrollment is 920, of whom 200 may be enrolled in evening classes.

== Academic departments ==
As a polytechnic college, the school's academics focus heavily on industrial and technological training. There are currently six academic departments

- Computer Assisted Design
- Applied Computer Modelling
- Electronic Instrumentation
- Mechatronics
- Automotive Electronics
- Information Communications Systems

== History ==
The college opened its doors on March 8, 1995. The first president was Kim Byeong-gi (김병기). At the time it was known by the same name as today, Busan Polytechnic College. In 2002, the name was altered to Busan IT Polytechnic College (부산 디지털 정보 기능대학). The name was finally changed back to the current version in 2003.

== See also ==
- Education in South Korea
- List of colleges and universities in South Korea
