= Korea Lift College =

Technical college in Geochang, South Gyeongsang, South Korea

Geochang Polytechnic College
- Motto: 창의, 실천, 성취 "Creativity, Practice, Accomplishment"
- Type: Public
- Established: 1997
- President: Kim cheon gyu
- Academic staff: 23 (2005)
- Undergraduates: 1,524
- Location: 120 Unjeong-1gil, Geochang-gun, Gyeongnam-do, Geochang County, South Gyeongsang, South Korea
- Campus: Rural
- Website: www.kcpc.ac.kr

- Korea Lift College
- Hangul: 한국 승강기 대학교
- RR: Hanguk seungganggi daehakgyo
- MR: Han'guk sŭngganggi taehakkyo

Geochang Polytechnic College, also Keochang Polytechnic College, is a technical college located in Geochang County, South Gyeongsang Province, South Korea. It is affiliated with the nationwide Korean Foundation for Polytechnic Colleges. It first opened its doors in 1997.

== Campus ==
The campus is located in Geochang-eup, a short distance outside the town. There are seven principal buildings on the campus, including a library and dormitory.

== History ==
The college received permission to open on the last day of 1996, and welcomed its first students only three months later. The first entering class consisted of 132 students.

== Organization ==
The college has six academic departments: Mechatronics, Industrial Design, Automotive, Electrical Instrumentation and Control, Electronics, and Computer Assisted Design. Courses of study are two years in length.

== Students and faculty ==
About 200 students enter the college each year. The graduation rate averages about 80%.

== See also ==
- List of colleges and universities in South Korea
- Education in South Korea
