= National Education Training Institute =

South Korean government agency

- Established: 1970; 56 years ago
- Location: Daegu, South Korea
- Website: www.neti.go.kr

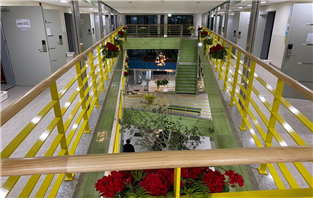
Chungnam Daegu 1 Living Treatment Center

National Education Training Institute (NETI; Korean: 중앙교육연수; RR: Jungang Gyoyuk Yeonsuwon) is a training institute set up by the Korean Ministry of Education. NETI is located in Daegu, South Korea.

== See also ==
- Education in South Korea
