= Yosu National University =

1917–2006 university in Yeosu, South Korea

Coordinates: 34.77473°N 127.69941°E

- Hangul: 여수대학교
- Hanja: 麗水大學校
- RR: Yeosu daehakgyo
- MR: Yŏsu taehakkyo

Yosu National University (Korean: 여수대학교) was a government-run university in Yeosu City, on the coast of South Jeolla province, South Korea. It is now the Yosu campus of Chonnam National University, after merging with it in March 2006. Although it has a strong traditional focus on fisheries study, the university now offers programs in a wide range of fields, such as Chinese studies and business administration. The 2002 undergraduate enrollment was reported at 6,461, with 453 graduate students. 166 full-time instructors were employed.

== History ==
Yosu was the first school of fisheries science to be opened in Korea. It was founded in 1917 as "Yosu Public Miniature Fisheries School" (여수공립간이수산학교). University presidents during this period were all Japanese. After national liberation in 1946, the school moved to its current location, and management was taken over by the South Korean government. It was made a technical school in 1963, and a technical college in 1975. In 1987, it became a full college with seven departments but remained specifically a Fisheries College. The school became a university (Yosu National Fisheries University) in 1993 and changed its name to simply Yosu National University in 1998. The school began granting doctoral degrees in 1997.

In March 2006, Yosu National University merged with Chonnam National University.

== See also ==
- List of colleges and universities in South Korea
- Education in South Korea
