= Busan Presbyterian University =

Educational Institution

- 부산장신대학교
- Type: Private
- Established: 1953; 73 years ago
- Location: Gimhae, South Gyeongsang, South Korea; 35.25633°N 128.86090°E
- Website: web.archive.org/web/20041218043749/http://www.bjc.ac.kr:80/

- Busan Presbyterian University
- Hangul: 부산장신대학교
- Hanja: 釜山長神大學校
- RR: Busan jangsin daehakgyo
- MR: Pusan changsin taehakkyo

Busan Presbyterian University, also known as Busan Jangsin University, is a private Christian university in Gimhae City, South Gyeongsang province, in southeastern South Korea. It provides undergraduate training in theology, social welfare, and special education, as well as graduate training in theology and pastoral research.

== History ==
The school was established in 1953 in Busan as a small three-year theological school. The current campus in Gimhae was acquired in 1996.

== See also ==
- List of colleges and universities in South Korea
- Education in South Korea
