= Taejae University =

Cyber university in South Korea

- 태재대학교
- Motto: The Next Answer
- Type: Private
- Established: 2023; 3 years ago
- Chairman: Chang-Gul Cho
- President: Jaeho Yeom
- Provost: Myoungshic Jhun
- Academic staff: 40 full-time 60 part-time (2023)
- Undergraduates: 32 (2023)
- Location: Jongno-gu, Seoul, South Korea; 37°35′02″N 126°59′17″E
- Colors: Purple and cyan
- Website: www.taejae.ac.kr

Taejae University (TAEJAE, Korean: 태재대학교; RR: Taejae Daehakgyo) is a distance learning private university headquartered in Seoul, South Korea. The university was established in 2023 by Chang-Gul Cho, the founder of South Korean corporation Hanssem. All students participate in the Global Engagement Program (GEP) at residential campuses in South Korea, the US, China, Russia, and Japan.

== History ==
The university received operational approval from the Ministry of Education on April 20, 2023, becoming the first four-year cyber university to open after 11 years in South Korea. Jaeho Yeom (19th President of Korea University) was appointed as the university's first president, along with Myoungshic Jhun (Professor Emeritus, Korea University) as provost.

In June 2023, the institution began its first admission process, offering 100 quota each for Korean and international applicants for the Fall intake. From a pool of 410 total applicants, 32 were selected for the inaugural class, making the 2023 admission rate 7.8%.

In August 2023, Taejae held its first matriculation ceremony at the university's building in Jongno-gu, Seoul.

On October 16, 2023, Stephen Kosslyn (former Dean of Social Science at Harvard) highlighted the institution as potentially leading the online university model during his speech at an AI education forum in Seoul, South Korea.

== Academics ==
The classes are conducted as discussion-based online seminars with no more than 20 students. Freshmen are initially admitted into the School of Innovation Foundations, and are able to choose their major from the second-year. The school also allows double registration with other universities.

=== Schools ===
- School of Innovation Foundations
- School of Humanities and Social Sciences
- School of Natural Sciences
- School of Data Science and Artificial Intelligence
- School of Business Innovation
