= Daegu Technical University =

Private University in the Dalseo-gu district of Daegu

Coordinates: 35.83524°N 128.54293°E

- Hangul: 대구공업대학교
- Hanja: 大邱工業大學校
- RR: Daegu gongeop daehakgyo
- MR: Taegu kongŏp taehakkyo

Daegu Technical University is a private technical university located in the Dalseo-gu district of Daegu, the third-largest city in South Korea. It provides training in primarily industrial fields. About 60 instructors are employed.

== Academics ==
Academic offerings are provided through the four academic divisions of the college: Engineering, Humanities and Society, Natural Science, and Arts. The majority of offerings, in fields such as automotive science and computer information, are under the Division of Engineering.

== History ==
The college was founded in 1976 by the Daegu Educational Foundation, as Daegu Industrial Technical School (대구실업전문학교). It became a technical college in 1979, and took on its present name in 1998.

== See also ==
- Education in South Korea
- List of colleges and universities in South Korea
