= Jeonbuk Science College =

Coordinates: 35.54899°N 126.86083°E

- Established: 1993
- Location: Jeongeup, North Jeolla, South Korea
- Website: http://www.jbsc.ac.kr/

- Jeonbuk Science College
- Hangul: 전북과학대학
- Hanja: 全北科學大學
- RR: Jeonbuk gwahak daehak
- MR: Chŏnbuk kwahak taehak

Jeonbuk Science College is a junior college in Jeongeup, North Jeolla Province, South Korea founded in 1993. The current president is Kwon E Dam (권이담).

== See also ==
- List of universities and colleges in South Korea
- Education in South Korea
