= Daegu Cyber University =

Online-based university in South Korea

- Hangul: 대구사이버대학교
- Hanja: 大邱사이버大學校
- RR: Daegu saibeo daehakgyo
- MR: Taegu saibŏ taehakkyo

Daegu Cyber University is an accredited South Korean online university. Its physical headquarters is located near Daegu in neighboring Gyeongsan City, North Gyeongsang province in South Korea.

Daegu Cyber University specializes in psychology, special education, therapy, social work, and other related courses. It was the first accredited online university by the Korean Ministry of Education in Gyeongsang province in South Korea.

The current president is Kun Yong Rhee (이근용), who has served since the school's foundation. Although administratively distinct, the university has close ties with Daegu University.

== Academics ==
Courses offered

Department of Special Education
Department of Art Therapy
Department of Speech Language Pathology
Department of Behavior Therapy
Department of Play Therapy
Department of Counseling Psychology
Department of Clinical Psychology
Department of Social Welfare
Department of Social Welfare Counseling
Department of Rehabilitation Counseling
Department of Public Administration
Department of Electronic & Information Communication Engineering
Department of Korean Language and Multicultural Studies
Department of Influencer

== History ==
The school, opened in 2002, is part of the Yeong Gwang School Academy, which was founded by Reverend Seongsan Rhee Young Shik with his founding spirit of "Love, Light, and Freedom."

== Sister schools ==
A cooperative graduate program is offered with Nova Southeastern University in the United States.

== See also ==
- List of colleges and universities in South Korea
- Online education
- Distance education
- Education in South Korea
