= Busan Institute of Science and Technology =

Educational Institution

Coordinates: 35.19446°N 129.00415°E

- 부산과학기술대학교
- Type: Private
- Established: December 31, 1976; 49 years ago
- President: Kang Gi-sung (강기성)
- Administrative staff: 361
- Students: 4,685
- Location: Busan, South Korea
- Campus: Suburban
- Colors: Blue
- Website: www.bist.ac.kr

- Busan Institute of Science and Technology
- Hangul: 부산과학기술대학교
- Hanja: 釜山科學技術大學校
- RR: Busan gwahak gisul daehakgyo
- MR: Pusan kwahak kisul taehakkyo

Busan Institute of Science and Technology is a private college located in Buk District, Busan, South Korea. It was called Busan College of Information Technology until February 2012.

== History ==
Founded in 1976 at Uam-dong, Nam-gu the school welcomed its first students in 1977, at which time it was known as Sungji Technical Professional School. It was renamed and reorganized in 1979 as Sungji Technical Junior College. The campus was moved to its current location in 1985. The college changed to its name, to reflect its focus on high technology in 1998 as Busan College of Information Technology.

== Courses ==
BIST consists of 4 departments and 25 different schools. The departments of BIST are School of Engineering, School of Humanities and Social Science, School of Natural Sciences and School of Arts and Physical Studies

== Colleges ==
- School of Engineering
  - Fusion Machine
    - Major in CAD / CAM
    - Major in Computer Applied Design
  - Automotive Engineering
    - Major in Automobile High-tech
    - Major in Automobile Tuning
    - Major in SUV / BOSCH
    - Major in Hybrid/Electric Vehicle
  - Computer Information
  - Electrical Automation
  - Aviation Electronics
  - Communication
  - Smart Electronics
  - Fine Chemistry
  - Fire Safety Management
  - Architecture
  - Drone Space Information
- School of Humanities and Social Science
  - Child Education
  - Medical Administration
  - Business Administration
  - Police/Security
  - Social Welfare
    - Social Welfare
    - Child Welfare and Care
  - Hotel Tourism Management
  - Korea-China Business
- School of Natural Sciences
  - Glasses Optics
  - Dental Hygiene
  - Nursing
  - Hotel/Restaurant&Cook
- School of Arts and Physical Studies
  - Beauty
  - Rehabilitation Exercise and Health
  - Design
    - Major in Industrial Design
    - Major in Fashion Design
    - Major in Jewelry

== Campus ==
Busan Institute of Science and Technology is situated Buk District, Busan.

== Presidents ==
- Kang Gi-sung (강기성) 2013.03.01 - Present
- Seo Yong-Beom () 2010.02.01 - 2013.03.01
- Oh Jeong-seok () 2008.09.08 - 2010-02-01
- Kang Ki-sung () 2001.01.05 - 2008.09.08
- Jeong Soon-Young () 1991.02.27 - 2001.01.0
- Lee Yoon Geun 1987.01.01 - 1991.02.27
- Choi Hak-yu () 1986.01.01 - 1987.01.01
- Choi Jeong-Rak () 1983.02.01 - 1986.01.01
- Park Hwa-sul () 1977.03.01 - 1983.02.01

== See also ==
- List of colleges and universities in South Korea
