= Korea Polytechnic III Chuncheon =

Vocational school in Chuncheon, South Korea

Korean name
- Hangul: 춘천기능대학
- Hanja: 春川技能大學
- RR: Chuncheon gineung daehak
- MR: Ch'unch'ŏn kinŭng taehak

Chuncheon Polytechnic College (Korean: 춘천기능대학) is a vocational training institution located in Chuncheon, Gangwon Province, South Korea. The current president is Yeom Si Hwan.

== Academics ==
Chuncheon Polytechnic offers technical training courses through its departments of Materials Science, Computer-aided Mechanics, Electricity, Electronics, Industrial Design, and Multimedia.

== History ==
The school was founded in 1973 as Chuncheon Vocational Training Institute, operated by the South Korean Ministry of Labor. It was reorganized as a polytechnic college offering the bachelor's degree in 1996.

== See also ==
- Education in South Korea
- List of colleges and universities in South Korea
