= Gyeongbuk College of Health =

Private university in Gimcheon, South Korea

Coordinates: 36.13838°N 128.08436°E

- Hangul: 경북보건대학교
- Hanja: 慶北保健大學校
- RR: Gyeongbuk bogeon daehakgyo
- MR: Kyŏngbuk pogŏn taehakkyo

Gyeongbuk College of Health (Korean: 경북보건대학교) is a private university located in Gimcheon, South Korea.
