= Korea Polytechnic VII Changwon =

Changwon Polytechnic College
- Changwon Polytechnic College campus
- Type: Vocational / National
- Established: 1977
- Students: 3,850
- Location: Changwon, South Korea
- Website: http://www.cpc.ac.kr/

- Korea Polytechnic VII Changwon
- Hangul: 창원기능대학
- Hanja: 昌原機能大學
- RR: Changwon gineung daehak
- MR: Ch'angwŏn kinŭng taehak

Changwon Polytechnic College provides technical training to students in Changwon, southeast South Korea. The school employs 52 professors as of 2004, and has an enrollment of 3,850 in various technical courses.

== Academics ==
The academics are divided into technician courses, master craftsmen courses, and vocational training/continuing education classes. Academic departments include the Department of Computer-Aided Machinery, Department of Mechatronics, Department of Automation Systems, Department of Computer-Aided Die and Mold, Department of Automotive Electronics, Department of Materials, Department of Automation of Plant Facilities, Department of Environmental Chemistry, Department of Electricity, and Department of Electronics.

== History ==
The school was first established in 1977. At that time it was under the management of the Ministry of Science and Technology; it was transferred to the Ministry of Labor (now the Ministry of Employment and Labor) in 1982. In 1998, the school was placed under the aegis of the Korea Foundation of Polytechnic Colleges, which manages polytechnic schools throughout the nation.

Under the KPFC, the school was renamed Changwon Polytechnic College, and continued to expand its offerings. The Institute of Continuing Education was opened in 2000, and the Business Incubation Center in the following year.

== See also ==
- Education in South Korea
- List of colleges and universities in South Korea
