= Korea Polytechnic IV Daejeon =

Vocational college in Daejeon, South Korea

Daejeon Polytechnic College
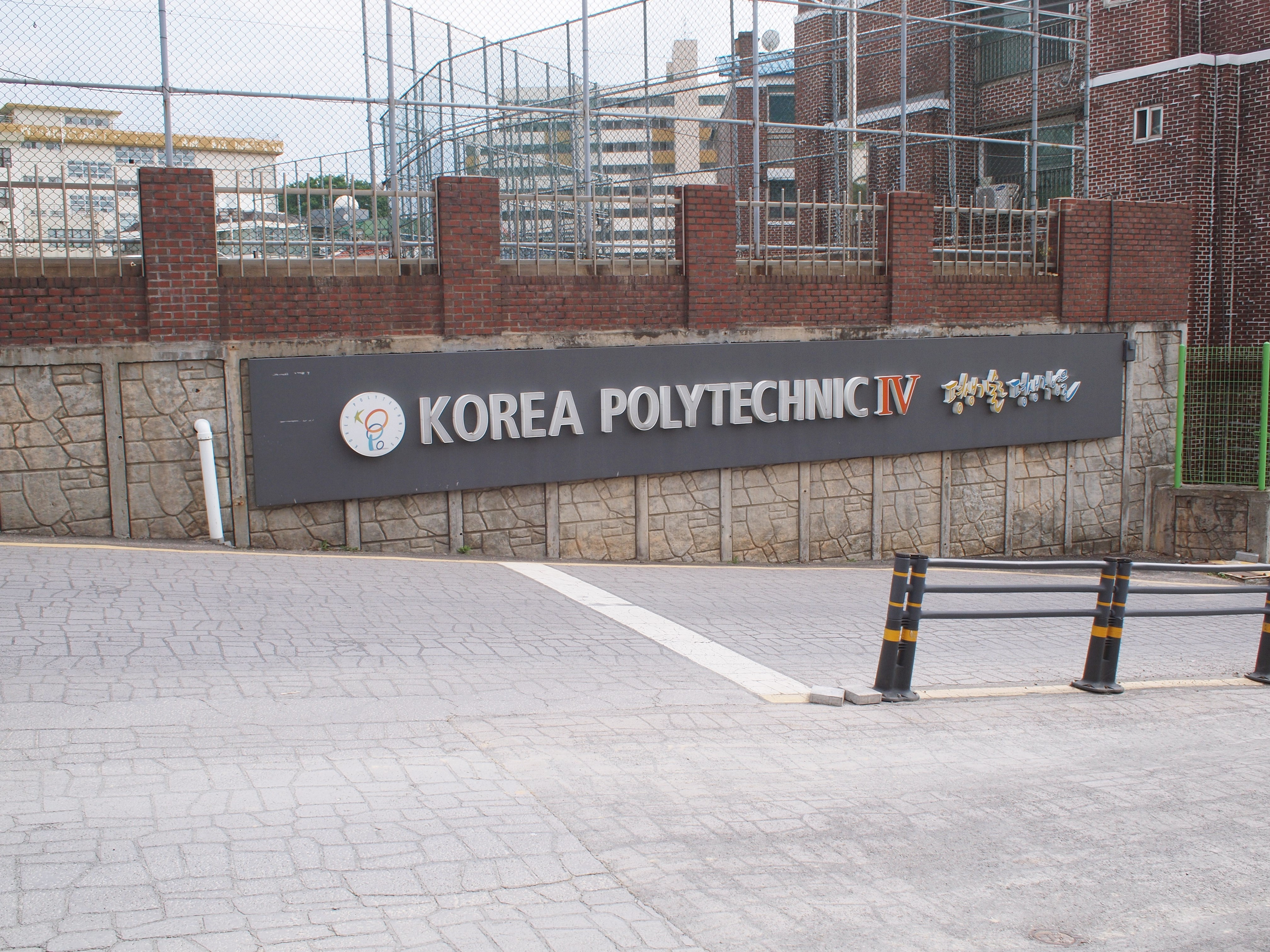
- Established: 1994
- President: Mun Gye-ok
- Location: Daejeon, Daejeon, South Korea
- Campus: Urban(Daejeon Campus)
- Website: www.tjpc.ac.kr

- Korea Polytechnic IV Daejeon
- Hangul: 대전기능대학
- Hanja: 大田技能大學
- RR: Daejeon gineung daehak
- MR: Taejŏn kinŭng taehak

Daejeon Polytechnic College is a vocational training college in the metropolitan city of Daejeon, South Korea. The current president is Mun Gye-ok (문계옥).

== Academics ==
The courses of study at the college are divided among seven departments:

- Multimedia, Mechatronics,
- Electrical Measurement and Control,
- Electronics,
- Computer-Aided Machinery,
- Computer-Aided Design,
- Computer-Aided Die and Mold,
- Automation of Industrial Installation.

Like most polytechnic colleges in the country, these courses strongly emphasize practical applications, through project-based practical learning.

== History ==
The college was founded in 1994.

== See also ==
- Education in South Korea
- List of colleges and universities in South Korea
