= Korea Polytechnic VI Daegu =

Vocational college in Daegu, South Korea

Korean name
- Hangul: 대구기능대학교
- Hanja: 大邱技能大學
- RR: Daegu gineung daehakgyo
- MR: Taegu kinŭng taehakkyo

Daegu Polytechnic College (Korean: 대구기능대학교) is a vocational training institution serving Daegu, the third-largest city in South Korea. The current president is Lee Chang-u (이창우). About 40 instructors are employed.

== Academics ==
The college comprises departments of Computer Aided Machinery, Computer Aided Design, Electrical Instrumentation, Electronics, Materials, Equipment Manufacturing Automation, Mechatronics, Nursing, Ophthalmology, Hotel and Tourism, and Environmental Chemistry.

== Notable people ==
- Hwang Chi-yeul, singer

== See also ==
- Education in South Korea
