= Daelim University College =

Technical college in Anyang, South Korea

Coordinates: 37°24′15″N 126°55′50″E

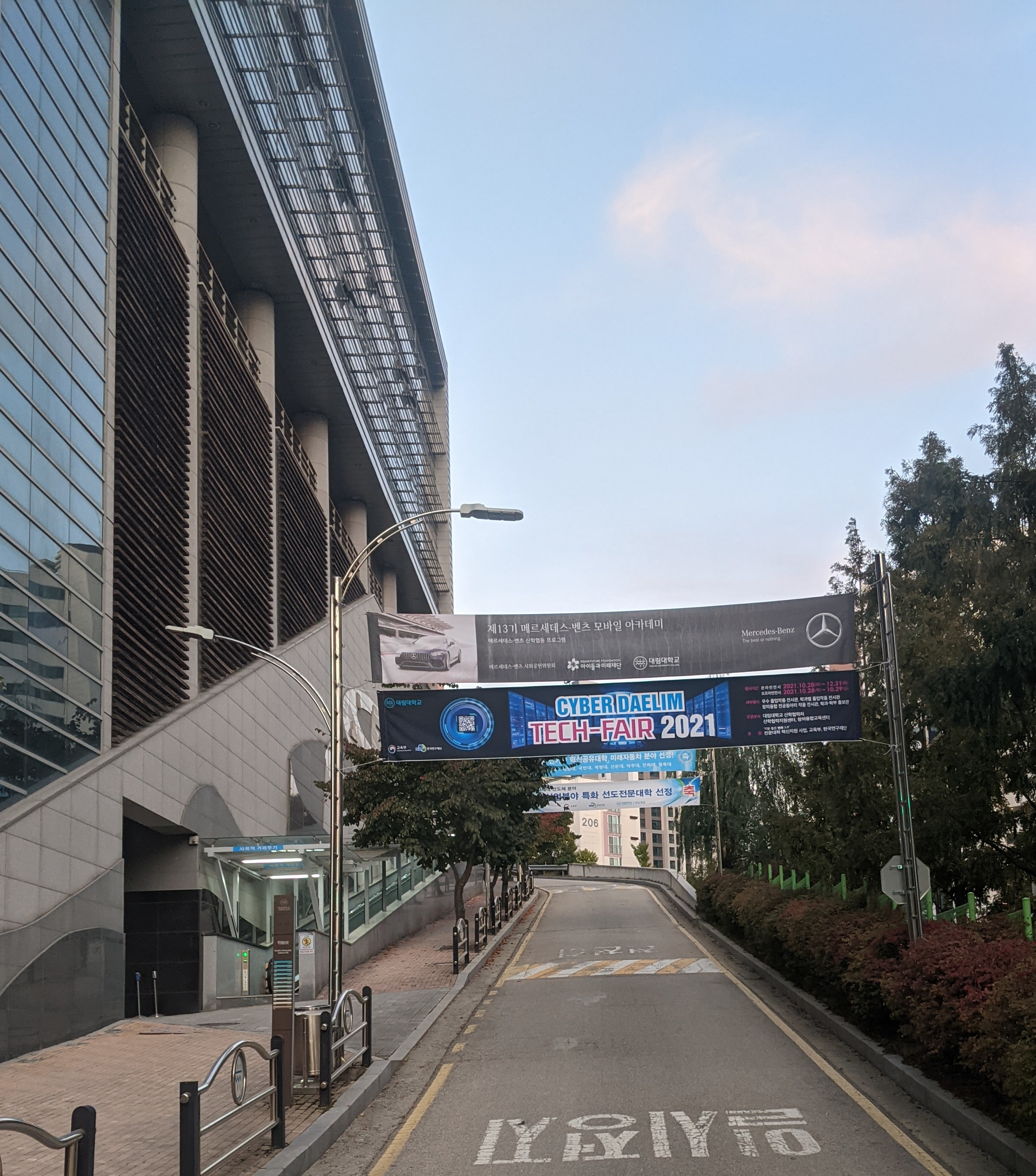

Korean name
- Hangul: 대림대학교
- Hanja: 大林大學校
- RR: Daerim daehakgyo
- MR: Taerim taehakkyo

Daelim College (Korean: 대림대학교) is a private technical college in South Korea. The college is located in the Dongan-gu district of Anyang City, Gyeonggi province, south of Seoul, and is just across the Anyang River from Anyang Station.

== Academics ==
The college's academic offerings are provided through divisions of Engineering, Humanities and Society, Arts, and Natural Science. There are about 110 faculty members.

== History ==
The college first opened as Daelim Technology School (대림공업전문학교) in 1977. It was established by the Daelim Educational Foundation, which is closely tied to the Daelim conglomerate. It became a junior college in 1990.

== See also ==
- List of colleges and universities in South Korea
- Education in South Korea
