= Korea Bio Polytechnic =

Coordinates: 36.14551°N 127.02181°E

Korean name
- Hangul: 한국폴리텍바이오대학
- Hanja: 韓國폴리텍바이오大學
- RR: Hanguk pollitek baio daehak
- MR: Han'guk p'ollit'ek paio taehak

Korea Bio Polytechnic College is a two-year institute of higher learning in Nonsan 320-905, South Korea. It has five departments with a total of one hundred fifty students.

The departments include:

- Department of Bioelectronics and Bioinformatics
- Department of Laboratory Animal Medicine
- Department of Bio Quality Control
- Department of Bio-Food Technology
