= North Chungcheong Province =

Province of South Korea

- Province
- Flag Logo

- Coordinates: 36°45′N 127°45′E
- Country: South Korea
- Region: Hoseo
- Capital: Cheongju
- Subdivisions: 3 cities; 8 counties

Government
  - Governor: Shin Yong-han (Democratic)

Area
  - Total: 7,433 km^{2} (2,870 sq mi)
  - Rank: 8th

Population (October, 2014)
  - Total: 1,578,934
  - Rank: 7th
  - Density: 213/km^{2} (550/sq mi)

Metropolitan Symbols
  - Flower: White Magnolia
  - Tree: Zelkova
  - Bird: Magpie

GDP (Nominal, 2023)
  - Total: KRW 88 trillion (US$70 billion)
  - Per capita: US$48,616
- ISO 3166 code: KR-43
- Dialect: Chungcheong
- Website: Official website (English)

Korean name
- Hangul: 충청북도
- Hanja: 忠淸北道
- RR: Chungcheongbuk-do
- MR: Ch'ungch'ŏngbuk-to

Short name
- Hangul: 충북
- Hanja: 忠北
- RR: Chungbuk
- MR: Ch'ungbuk

North Chungcheong Province (Korean: 충청북도; Korean pronunciation: [tɕʰuŋ.tɕʰʌŋ.buk̚.t͈o]), also known as Chungbuk (충북), is a province of South Korea. North Chungcheong has a population of 1,578,934 (2014) and has a geographic area of 7,433 km^{2} (2,870 mi^{2}) located in the Hoseo region on the south-centre of the Korean Peninsula. North Chungcheong borders the provinces of Gyeonggi and Gangwon to the north, North Gyeongsang to the east, North Jeolla to the south and South Chungcheong, Sejong Special Autonomous City and Daejeon Metropolitan City to the west.

Cheongju is the capital and largest city of North Chungcheong, with other major cities including Chungju and Jecheon.

North Chungcheong was established in 1896 from the province of Chungcheong, one of the Eight Provinces of Korea, consisting of the northeastern half of the territory, and is South Korea's only landlocked province. North Chungcheong was known as Chūsei-hoku Prefecture during the Japanese Colonial Period from 1910 and became part of South Korea following the division of Korea in 1945.

== Geography ==
The province is part of the Hoseo region, and is bounded on the west by Chungcheongnam-do province, on the north by Gyeonggi-do and Gangwon-do provinces, on the south by Jeollabuk-do province, and on the east by Gyeongsangbuk-do. Chungcheongbuk-do is the only land-locked province in South Korea. The province is mostly mountainous, dominated by the Noryeong Mountains to the north and the Sobaek Mountains to the east.

== Demographics ==
Historical population
Year	Pop.	±%
1930	890,877	—
1940	935,111	+5.0%
1949	1,145,964	+22.5%
1960	1,369,780	+19.5%
1970	1,453,899	+6.1%
1980	1,424,083	−2.1%
1990	1,389,686	−2.4%
2000	1,466,567	+5.5%
2010	1,512,157	+3.1%
2020	1,632,088	+7.9%

== Resources ==
Agricultural products includes rice, barley, beans, and potatoes, but the province specializes in ginseng and tobacco. The tobacco was introduced from the US in 1912, transplanted from Virginia.

There are mineral reserves of gold, iron, coal, steatite, fluorite, and molybdenum, as well as marble and limestone in the northern part of the province. Silk weaving plays an important role.

== Attractions ==
The main attractions in the province are Mount Songni (1,058 metres [3,471 ft]) in the Sobaek mountains and its national park. Beopjusa, the site of one of the oldest temples of Korea is located in this national park, as is Guinsa, the headquarters of the Cheontae sect. There is another national park around Mount Worak.

== Administrative divisions ==
Chungcheongbuk-do is divided into three cities (si) and eight counties (gun). Each entity is listed below in English, Hangul, and Hanja.

Map	#	Name	Hangul	Hanja	Population (2012)	Subdivisions
— Specific City —
	1	Cheongju	청주시	淸州市	845,325	4 ilban-gu—3 eup, 10 myeon, 30 haengjeong-dong
— City —
	2	Chungju	충주시	忠州市	208,404	1 eup, 12 myeon, 12 haengjeong-dong
	3	Jecheon	제천시	堤川市	137,612	1 eup, 7 myeon, 9 haengjeong-dong
— County —
	5	Eumseong County	음성군	陰城郡	92,581	2 eup, 7 myeon
	6	Jincheon County	진천군	鎭川郡	63,344	1 eup, 6 myeon
	7	Okcheon County	옥천군	沃川郡	53,337	1 eup, 8 myeon
	8	Yeongdong County	영동군	永同郡	50,732	1 eup, 10 myeon
	9	Goesan County	괴산군	槐山郡	37,705	1 eup, 10 myeon
	10	Jeungpyeong County	증평군	曾坪郡	34,194	1 eup, 1 myeon
	11	Boeun County	보은군	報恩郡	34,500	1 eup, 10 myeon
	12	Danyang County	단양군	丹陽郡	31,334	2 eup, 6 myeon

== Religion ==
Religion in Chungcheongbuk-do (2015)
1. Not religious (59.9%)
2. Buddhism (16.3%)
3. Protestantism (15.8%)
4. Catholicism (7.30%)
5. Other (0.70%)

According to the 2015 census, 16.3% of the population follows Buddhism and 23.1% follow Christianity (15.8% Protestantism and 7.3% Catholicism). 59.9% of the population is not religious and 0.7% of the population follows other religions.

== Education ==
Chungcheongbuk-do is the site of several tertiary institutions, including:

- Cheongju National University of Education
- Cheongju University
- Chung Cheong College
- Chungbuk National University
- Daewon Science College
- Far East University
- Gangdong College
- Konkuk University
- Korea Air Force Academy
- Korea National University of Education
- Korea National University of Transportation (formerly Chungju National University)
- Youngdong University
- Jusung College
- Semyung University
- Seowon University
