= Gangneung Yeongdong University =

College in South Korea

Coordinates: 37.74715°N 128.85567°E

Gangneung Yeongdong College
- Motto: 성실•인화•창조 (Sincerity, Concord, Creativity)
- Type: Private
- Established: 1963
- President: Yun Yang-so
- Faculty: c. 100
- Location: Gangneung, Gangwon-do, South Korea
- Campus: Rural
- Website: www.gyc.ac.kr

- Gangneung Yeongdong University
- Hangul: 강릉영동대학교
- Hanja: 江陵嶺東大學校
- RR: Gangneung Yeongdong daehakgyo
- MR: Kangnŭng Yŏngdong taehakkyo

Gangneung Yeongdong College is a private technical college in Seongsan-myeon, a rural area of Gangneung city in northeastern South Korea. It takes its name from the Yeongdong region, in which it is located.

== Campus ==
There are twelve major buildings on the campus, which covers an area of 113,000 square metres.

== History ==
The school officially opened on June 1, 1963, as Gangneung Superior Technical School of Nursing (강릉간호고등기술학교). It had a maximum enrollment of 90 students. Enrollment was raised to 120 in 1966, and doubled to 240 in 1971. It was redesignated a technical college in 1973.

== Organization ==
As a technical college, the school provides courses of study of two or three years in length. Two-year courses are provided by the Divisions of Health (departments of Optometry and Beauty), Hospitality, Social Service and Industry. Three-year courses are provided by the Divisions of Health, Nursing, and Social Service (department of early childhood education).

== Students and faculty ==
Entering classes now average about 1,500 students, of which more than 90% study in regular daytime classes. The remainder attend night school.

== See also ==
- List of universities and colleges in South Korea
- Education in South Korea
