= Nagasaki University of Foreign Studies =

University in Japan

Coordinates: 32°48′52″N 129°50′29″E

Nagasaki University of Foreign Studies (長崎外国語大学, Nagasaki Gaikokugo Daigaku) is located in the northern part of Nagasaki, Japan. It offers four-year degrees in English and in French, Korean, British and American English, German, and Japanese for foreign students. Participation in the degree-seeking programs is open to students from around the world. A level of Japanese language ability is necessary. The university also organizes two short-term programs for students who are in Japan as study abroad students: the Japan Studies in Nagasaki (JASIN) Program and the Nagasaki International Communications Studies (NICS) Program. The JASIN Program is designed for students from Western countries so that the application, orientation, counseling and Japan Studies classes are conducted in English. The NICS Program is designed for students from Asia so that the above services are conducted in Japanese. Both Programs require Japanese language study. Students are placed in an appropriate level of Japanese language study (Beginning to Advanced) according to a placement test. No previous Japanese language study is required of JASIN students, but NICS students are required to begin from an intermediate level of Japanese. It was founded in December 1945, based upon the ideals of the YMCA. Its motto is to promote peace through international communication and understanding.

This university is located in a very historic city, and provides not only classes for Japanese students but international students (ryuugakusei) as well.
