= Junior college =

Type of post-secondary educational institution

A junior college is a type of post-secondary institution that offers vocational and academic training that is designed to prepare students for either skilled trades and technical occupations or support roles in professions such as engineering, accountancy, business administration, nursing, medicine, architecture, and criminology.

Junior college can have different meanings depending on the country; in some regions it is referred to as upper secondary education while in others it is called post-secondary institutions. Despite the differences, junior colleges help prepare students for entry into the workforce by providing them with further academic study for their future careers.

Often times, those types of colleges offer two-year associate's degrees that are intended for students that want to later transfer to a college for a four-year bachelor's degree to finish their undergraduate education, pending adequate grades. Students typically attend those types of colleges for one to three years, which is also dependent on the country.

== History and development ==
The early twentieth century marked the emergence of junior colleges in an effort to provide more flexible educational pathways that would provide higher education. William Rainey Harper had the idea of splitting the 4 years of education needed for a bachelor's degree into two parts, which began being called junior college.

The first 2-year colleges began to operate in small and large states in the United States during the early 1900s where several of the early 2-year colleges originated independently through the expansions of high schools to include 13th and 14th grades.

== By country ==
=== Pakistan ===
In Pakistan, after the completion of Secondary School Certificate, students who want to further pursue their education, the must apply for the junior college, which is also called as intermediate college. They can choose either of the three groups out of science, arts (or humanities) or commerce. They attend the college for 2 years. Some colleges also offer higher education like undergraduate and graduate degrees like GCUL, FCCU, MAOC etc.

=== Bangladesh ===
In Bangladesh, after completing the tenth-grade board exam (Secondary School Certificate), students attend two years of junior college, named intermediate college. After passing the SSC exam, students can apply for their desired colleges, where they study in three groups, namely Science, Humanities and Commerce, for two years. After that, students sit for Higher Secondary Certificate at the end of their second year in intermediate College.

=== India ===
In India, junior colleges are higher secondary educational institutions that offer higher secondary education (Class 11th-12th), similar to Senior Secondary Schools or High Schools. However, unlike schools in India, which typically provide education from Nursery through Class 12th, these institutions are solely focused on higher secondary education (Class 11th-12th).

While the majority of national and state boards in India offer continuous schooling from Nursery to Class 12th, some state boards, such as those in Telangana, Maharashtra, Odisha, Assam, Karnataka, Andhra Pradesh, Bihar, and Uttar Pradesh, have a system where students must apply to junior colleges after completing Class 10th board exams (SSLC/ SSC) to continue their education in Class 11th and 12th. In these states, junior colleges are commonly referred to as Pre-University Colleges (PU Colleges), Intermediate Colleges, or Higher Secondary institutions. Additionally, junior colleges are often co-located with Degree Colleges or Secondary Schools.

=== Japan ===
In Japan after World War II, junior colleges (Japanese: 短期大学) typically provide two-year courses of study but may also provide a three-year course of study. Students who complete the course of study at a junior college are entitled to an associate degree or diploma. In Japan before World War II, there were three years of national junior colleges (Japanese: 旧制高校).

- The 1st junior college in Tokyo
- The 2nd junior college in Sendai
- The 3rd junior college in Kyoto
- The 4th junior college in Kanazawa
- The 5th junior collegein Kumamoto
- The 6th junior college in Okayama
- The 7th junior college in Kagoshima
- The 8th junior college in Nagoya

=== Netherlands ===
In the Netherlands, junior college is equivalent to MBO (middle-level vocational education). The MBO lasts one to four years, depending on the level. There are 4 levels offered to students:

- MBO level 1: Assistant training. It lasts 1 year maximum. It is focused on simple executive tasks. If the student graduates, he/she can apply to MBO level 2.
- MBO level 2: Basic vocational education. The programme lasts 2 to 3 years and is focused on executive tasks.
- MBO level 3: The programme lasts 3 to 4 years. Students are taught to achieve their tasks independently.
- MBO level 4: Middle Management VET. It lasts 3 to 4 years and prepares for jobs with higher responsibility. It also opens the gates to higher education.

At all levels, MBO offers 2 possible pathways: a school-based education, where training within a company takes between 20 and 59% of the curriculum, or an apprenticeship education, where this training represents more than 60% of the study time. Both paths lead to the same certification. Students in MBO are mostly between 16 and 35. Students of the "apprenticeship" path are overall older (25+). After MBO (4 years), pupils can enroll in HBO (higher professional education) or enter the job market.

=== Singapore ===
In Singapore, a Junior College (JC) is equivalent to a sixth form college in the United Kingdom. After the GCE 'O' level examinations in Secondary 4 or 5, students may apply for admission to either a JC or a polytechnic. The two years spent in a JC culminate in a GCE 'A' level certificate, which is the most common qualification used for university admission.

In the past, secondary schools offered both 'O' and 'A' Levels and students in classes studying for the 'A' Levels were known as the "Pre-University" class. During the 1980s and 1990s, the government began the process of transferring all 'A' Level courses to centralised JCs. At present, students finish their 'O' Levels at a secondary school and may choose to take the 'A' Levels at a JC or as a private candidate.

=== South Korea ===
In South Korea, junior colleges (Korean: 전문대학) typically provide 2-year courses of study but may also provide a 3-year course of study if permitted by presidential decree. Students who complete the course of study at a junior college are entitled to an associate degree or diploma. Junior colleges are also permitted, subject to presidential decree, to offer "advanced major courses" for their students that will lead to a bachelor's degree. Junior colleges in South Korea include Yeungjin College and Jeonbuk Science College.

=== United States ===
In the United States, a junior college is a (usually intermediate) two-year post-secondary school whose main purpose is to provide academic, vocational and professional education. The highest certificate offered by such schools is usually an associate degree, although junior college students may continue their education at a four-year university or college, transferring some or all of the credits earned at the junior college toward the degree requirements of the four-year school.

The term "junior college" historically referred to all pre- or non-bachelor's degree (four-year) granting post-secondary schools; however, many public junior colleges, which typically aim to serve a local community, have replaced "junior" with "community" in their names. Thus, most self-identified junior colleges in the United States today are private institutions, although only a small percentage of all two-year institutions are private.

Private junior colleges in the United States reached their peak numbers in the 1940s, and have been declining ever since. In the course of the 20th century, many public and private junior colleges evolved into four-year colleges, in some cases passing through an intermediary period as a four-year junior college; institutions that followed this trajectory include Westminster College in Salt Lake City and Shimer College in Mt. Carmel, Illinois.

Junior college is often used for a variety of different reasons. First, it usually costs less than a traditional four-year college. For this reason, it is common for people who are trying to save money to attend junior college before transferring to a four-year university. Junior colleges are also used to provide trade school certifications. In addition, junior colleges tend to have higher acceptance rates than traditional colleges. Junior college students can also be parents trying to get flexible classes within their schedule, with around 23% of enrolled students having children dependent on them. Therefore, they are often a good option for students who performed poorly in high school but still want to attend a more selective university later on.

==== Cultural connotations ====
Junior colleges in the United States have long had to contend with a reputation for lower academic standards. The concept can be traced back 100 years to the original public junior college, Joliet Junior College, which was established in a high school as the equivalent of thirteenth and fourteenth grades, to prepare qualified students for the final two years of college. To some extent, this is inherent in the junior college mission of providing practical education to students who for various reasons fall outside the typical profile of a four-year college student (for example, someone who has graduated from high school and spent several years working in a relatively unskilled job). Over the years, such colleges developed a reputation as schools of last resort.

According to federal statistics, 42% of public community college freshmen take remedial courses. This does not necessarily affect their future transfer prospects: a junior college graduate with good grades can generally transfer to a four-year school and go on to obtain a full bachelor's degree. There is a growing movement of students who are attending junior colleges to save significant sums of money in the first two years of a four-year education.

==== Athletics ====
Certain junior colleges also serve as incubators for college athletes, particularly in basketball and football; in sports parlance, they are sometimes referred to as "juco"s. A talented player who would not meet the academic standards of a major college program may be able to play for two years in junior college, establishing an academic record in the process, and then transfer to a major college. This process has occasionally resulted in scandals, often involving the academics of the student athletes.

==== Military junior college ====
In the United States, a military junior college allows cadets to become commissioned officers in the armed forces reserve in two years, instead of the usual four. The students must go on to complete a bachelor's degree before serving as regular officers on active duty.

There are currently four military junior colleges:

- Georgia Military College, Milledgeville, Georgia
- Marion Military Institute, Marion, Alabama
- New Mexico Military Institute, Roswell, New Mexico
- Valley Forge Military Academy and College, Wayne, Pennsylvania

== See also ==
- Four-year junior college
- Community college
- Cooling out
- Cram school
- Specialist school
