= Ministry of Education (South Korea) =

Government ministry

- 교육부

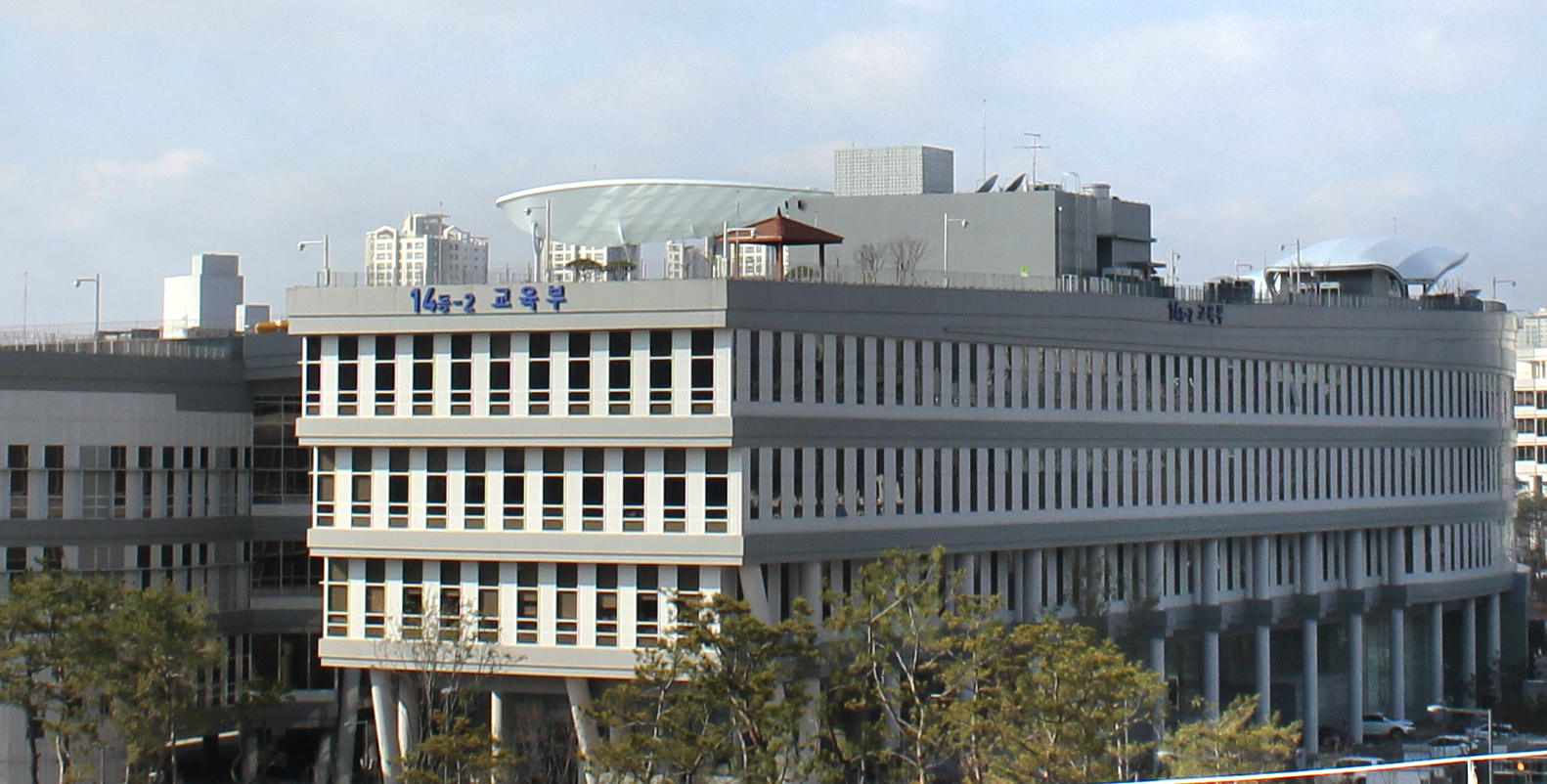
- MOE headquarters in Sejong

Agency overview
- Formed: March 23, 2013
- Preceding agencies: Ministry of Education (1948–1990); Ministry of Education (1990–2001); Ministry of Education & Human Resources Development (2001–2008); Ministry of Education, Science and Technology (2008–2013)
- Jurisdiction: Government of South Korea
- Headquarters: 408 Galmae-ro, Sejong, Republic of Korea 30119
- Minister responsible: Choi Kyo-jin
- Deputy Minister responsible: Oh Seok-hwan
- Website: Official English Site

Korean name
- Hangul: 교육부
- Hanja: 敎育部
- RR: Gyoyukbu
- MR: Kyoyukpu

The Ministry of Education (MOE; Korean: 교육부) is a cabinet-level division of the government of South Korea. It was created on March 23, 2013. It should not be confused with seventeen regional Offices of Education whose heads, Superintendents, are directly elected in local elections.

Its headquarters are in the Sejong Regional Government Complex in Sejong City. Previously it was located in the Central Government Complex in Jongno District, Seoul.

== Affiliated agencies ==
- National Academy of Sciences of the Republic of Korea
- National Education Training Institute
- National Institute of Korean History

== Logo ==
1948~1991

1999-2001

2001~2008

2008~2013

2013-2016

2016~present

== See also ==
- Education in South Korea
- Korean Council for University Education
- Korean Educational Development Institute
