= List of research universities in South Korea =

This is a list of research universities in the South Korea classified as Research university or University(Institute) of science and technology in the Ministry of Education (South Korea). Research universities were designated until 1991, universities of science and technology were established until 2007.

== Research Universities ==
South Korean research universities (Korean: 종합대학) refer to schools designated as ~Daehakgyo (Korean: 대학교) before December 31, 1991. All S. Korean research universities operate both undergraduate and graduate courses.

Research Universities
| Institution | Abbreviation | Control | City | Regional |
|---|---|---|---|---|
| Ajou University | AJU | Private | Suwon City | Gyeonggi |
| Andong National University | ANU | National | Andong City | North Gyeongsang |
| Busan University of Foreign Studies | BUFS | Private | Gemjeong District | Busan |
| Changwon National University | CWNU | National | Changwon City | South Gyeongsang |
| Cheongju University | CJU | Private | Cheongju City | North Chungcheong |
| Chonnam National University | CNU | National | Buk District | Gwangju |
| Chosun University | CU | Private | Dong District | Gwangju |
| Chung-Ang University | CAU | Private | Dongjak District | Seoul |
| Chungbuk National University | CBNU | National | Cheongju City | North Chungcheong |
| Chungnam National University | CNU | National | Yuseong District | Daejeon |
| Daegu University | DU | Private | Gyeongsan City | North Gyeongsang |
| Daejeon University | DJU | Private | Dong District | Daejeon |
| Dankook University | DKU | Private | Yongin City | Gyeonggi |
| Dong-A University | | Private | Saha District | Busan |
| Dongduk Women's University | DONGDUK | Private | Sungbuk District | Seoul |
| Dong-Eui University | | Private | Busanjin District | Busan |
| Dongguk University | DU | Private | Jung District | Seoul |
| Dongshin University | DSU | Private | Naju City | South Jeolla |
| Duksung Women's University | DUKSUNG | Private | Dobong District | Seoul |
| Ewha Womans University | EWHA | Private | Seodaemun District | Seoul |
| Gachon University | GCU | Private | Seongnam City | Gyeonggi |
| Gangneung-Wonju National University | GWNU | National | Gangneung City | Gangwon |
| Gwangju University | GU | Private | Nam District | Gwangju |
| Gyeongsang National University | GNU | National | Jinju City | South Gyeongsang |
| Hallym University | HALLYM | Private | Chuncheon City | Gangwon |
| Hankook University of Foreign Studies | HUFS | Private | Dongdaemun District | Seoul |
| Hannam University | HNU | Private | Daedeok District | Daejeon |
| Hanyang University | HU | Private | Seongbuk District | Seoul |
| Hongik University | HONGIK | Private | Mapo District | Seoul |
| Hoseo University | HOSEO | Private | Asan City | South Chungcheong |
| Incheon National University | INU | National (Corporate) | Yeonsu District | Incheon |
| Inha University | INHA | Private | Michuhol District | Incheon |
| Inje University | INJE | Private | Gimhae City | South Gyeongsang |
| Jeju National University | JNU | National | Jeju City | Jeju |
| Jeonbuk National University | JBNU | National | Jeonju City | North Jeolla |
| Jeonju University | JU | Private | Jeonju City | North Jeolla |
| Kangwon National University | KNU | National | Chuncheon | Gangwon |
| Keimyung University | KMU | Private | Dalseo District | Daegu |
| Kongju National University | KNU | National | Gongju City | South Chungcheong |
| Konkuk University | KU | Private | Gwangjin District | Seoul |
| Kookmin University | KMU | Private | Seongbuk District | Seoul |
| Korea National University of Education | KNUE | National | Chungju City | North Chungcheong |
| Korea Maritime and Ocean University | KMOU | National | Yeongdo District | Busan |
| Korea University | KU | Private | Seongbuk District | Seoul |
| Kunsan National University | KNU | National | Gunsan City | North Jeolla |
| Kwangwoon University | KW | Private | Nowon District | Seoul |
| Kyonggi University | KGU | Private | Suwon City | Gyeonggi |
| Kyung Hee University | KHU | Private | Dongdaemun District | Seoul |
| Kyungnam University | KU | Private | Changwon City | South Gyeongsang |
| Kyungpook National University | KNU | National | Buk District | Daegu |
| Kyungsung University | KYUNGSUNG | Private | Nam District | Busan |
| Mokpo National University | MNU | National | Muan County | South Jeolla |
| Myongji University | MJU | Private | Yongin City | Gyeonggi |
| Pukyong National University | PKNU | National | Nam District | Busan |
| Pusan National University | PNU | National | Geumjeong District | Busan |
| Sangji University | SJU | Private | Wonju City | Gangwon |
| Sangmyung University | SMU | Private | Jongno District | Seoul |
| Sungshin Women's University | SUNGSHIN | Private | Seongbuk District | Seoul |
| Sejong University | SEJONG | Private | Gwangjin District | Seoul |
| Seoul National University | SNU | National (Corporate) | Gwanak District | Seoul |
| Seoul Women's University | SWU | Private | Mapo District | Seoul |
| Sogang University | SU | Private | Mapo District | Seoul |
| Sookmyung Women's University | SOOKMYUNG | Private | Yongsan District | Seoul |
| Soonchunhyang University | SCH | Private | Asan City | South Chungcheong |
| Sunchon National University | SCNU | National | Suncheon City | South Jeolla |
| Sungkyunkwan University | SKKU | Private | Jongno District | Seoul |
| Soongsil University | SSU | Private | Dongjak District | Seoul |
| University of Seoul | UOS | Public | Dongdaemun District | Seoul |
| University of Suwon | USW | Private | Hwaseong City | Gyeonggi |
| University of Ulsan | UOU | Private | Nam District | Ulsan |
| Wonkwang University | WKU | Private | Iksan City | North Jeolla |
| Yeungnam University | YU | Private | Gyeongsan City | North Gyeongsang |
| Yonsei University | YSU | Private | Seodaemun District | Seoul |

== Institutes of Science and Technology ==
Institutes of Science and Technology (Korean: 이공계 중점 대학) are science and technology academic research universities established by the government. They do not study various disciplines. However, they focus on science and engineering.

Institutes of Science and Technology
| Institution | Abbreviation | Control | City | Regional |
|---|---|---|---|---|
| Daegu Gyeongbuk Institute of Science and Technology | DGIST | National (Corporate) | Dalseong County | Daegu |
| Gwangju Institute of Science and Technology | GIST | National (Corporate) | Buk District | Gwangju |
| Korea Advanced Institute of Science and Technology | KAIST | National (Corporate) | Yuseong District | Daejeon |
| Ulsan National Institute of Science and Technology | UNIST | National (Corporate) | Ulju County | Ulsan |
| University of Science and Technology | UST | etc. | Yuseong District | Daejeon |

== See also ==
- Research University
- List of research universities in the United States
