= List of national universities in South Korea =

National Universities (국립대학교) in South Korea were established by the South Korean government to provide higher education for aiding the development of the country. Among all the universities in Korea, the most prestigious are KAIST and Seoul National University.

== Flagship Korean National Universities ==
- Chonnam National University - Gwangju, South Jeolla
- Chungbuk National University - Cheongju, North Chungcheong
- Chungnam National University - Daejeon
- Gyeongsang National University - Jinju, South Gyeongsang
- Jeju National University - Jeju
- Jeonbuk National University - Jeonju, North Jeolla
- Kangwon National University - Chuncheon, Gangwon
- Kyungpook National University - Daegu, North Gyeongsang
- Pusan National University - Busan, South Gyeongsang
- Seoul National University - Seoul

== National Universities ==
- Andong National University - Andong, North Gyeongsang
- Changwon National University - Changwon, South Gyeongsang
- Gangneung-Wonju National University - Gangneung, Gangwon
- Gyeongnam National University of Science and Technology - Jinju, South Gyeongsang
- Hanbat National University - Daejeon
- Hankyong National University - Anseong, Gyeonggi
- Incheon National University - Incheon
- Kongju National University - Gongju, South Chungcheong
- Korea Maritime and Ocean University - Busan
- Korea National University of Education - Cheongwon, North Chungcheong
- Korea National University of Transportation - Chungju, North Chungcheong
- Kumoh National Institute of Technology - Gumi, North Gyeongsang
- Kunsan National University - Gunsan, North Jeolla
- Mokpo National Maritime University - Mokpo, South Jeolla
- Mokpo National University - Mokpo, South Jeolla
- Pukyong National University - Busan
- Seoul National University of Science and Technology - Seoul
- Sunchon National University - Suncheon, South Jeolla

== Special National Universities ==
- Academy of Korean Studies - Seongnam, Gyeonggi
- Armed Forces Nursing Academy, Daejeon
- National Cancer Center Graduate School of Cancer Science and Policy - Goyang, Gyeonggi
- Korea National Sport University - Seoul
- Korea National University of Arts - Seoul
- Korea National University of Cultural Heritage - Buyeo, South Chungcheong
- Korean National Police University - Asan, South Chungcheong
- Korea Air Force Academy - Cheongju, North Chungcheong
- Korea Military Academy - Seoul
- Korea National Defense University - Seoul
- Korea Army Academy at Yeongcheon - Yeongcheon, North Gyeongsang
- Korea Naval Academy - Changwon, South Gyeongsang

== Special National Universities of Science and Technology ==
- Gwangju Institute of Science and Technology (GIST) - Gwangju
- Korea Advanced Institute of Science & Technology (KAIST) - Daejeon
- Daegu Gyeongbuk Institute of Science and Technology (DGIST) - Daegu
- Ulsan National Institute of Science and Technology (UNIST) - Ulsan
- Korea University of Science and Technology (UST) - Daejeon

== National Universities of Education ==
The following national universities were established to train primary School teachers:

- Busan National University of Education - Busan
- Cheongju National University of Education - Cheongju, North Chungcheong
- Chinju National University of Education - Jinju, South Gyeongsang
- Chuncheon National University of Education - Chuncheon, Gangwon
- Daegu National University of Education - Daegu
- Gongju National University of Education - Gongju, North Chungcheong
- Gwangju National University of Education - Gwangju
- Gyeongin National University of Education - Incheon
- Jeonju National University of Education - Jeonju, North Jeolla
- Seoul National University of Education - Seoul

== National colleges ==
- Korea National College of Agriculture and Fisheries - Jeonju, North Jeolla
- Korea National University of Welfare - Pyeongtaek, Gyeonggi

== Distance education ==
- Korea National Open University - Seoul

== Other Public Universities and Colleges in South Korea ==
University

- University of Seoul - Seoul

The University of Seoul is the only municipal university in South Korea.

College

- Chungnam Provincial College - Cheongyang County, South Chungcheong
- Chungbuk Provincial College - Okcheon County, North Chungcheong
- Gangwon Provincial University - Gangneung, Gangwon
- Gyeongbuk Provincial College - Yecheon County, North Gyeongsang
- Gyeongnam Provincial Geochang College - Geochang County, South Gyeongsang
- Gyeongnam Provincial Namhae College - Namhae County, South Gyeongsang
- Jeonnam Provincial College – Damyang County and Jangheung County, South Jeolla

== See also ==
- List of universities and colleges in South Korea
- Education in Korea
