= Gongju National University of Education =

University in Gongju, South Korea

- Type: Elementary teacher training
- Established: 1938
- President: Ahn Byeong-keun (안병근)
- Location: Gongju, South Chungcheongnam, South Korea; 36.444°N 127.119°E
- Website: www.gjue.ac.kr/gjue/eng.do

Korean name
- Hangul: 공주교육대학교
- Hanja: 公州敎育大學敎
- RR: Gongju gyoyuk daehakgyo
- MR: Kongju kyoyuk taehakkyo

Gongju National University of Education (GNUE; Korean: 공주교육대학교) is a national educational university located in Gongju, South Korea. It is in charge of Daejeon Metropolitan City, Sejong Special Self-Governing City, and South Chungcheong Province among the 10 educational universities in South Korea.

The university was founded in April 1938 under the name Gongju Women Instructor's School. In 1962, The university began specializing in elementary school teacher training that offered a two-year program and was renamed to Gongju University of Education. As of 1982, the system changed to a four-year program from a two-year program. In 1993, the university modified the name to Gongju National University of Education. Since its establishment in 1938, over 25,000 graduates have become elementary teachers.

== International relationships ==
In 1980, Gongju National University Education established a sisterhood relationship with Lansing College in the United States. In 1990, University of Alberta also makes a sisterhood relationship with GNUE. In 2003, New Zealand's Christchurch Polytechnic Institute of Technology, and established an Arts and Science program exchange. In 2006, Hunan Normal University from China agreed on an Arts and Science program exchange with GNUE. In 2007, Kobe University (Japan), the University of Oregon (U.S.A) and the University of Philippines (Philippines) all agreed to have Arts and Science exchange program with GNUE.

== Undergraduate programs ==
Gongju National University Education consists of 12 undergraduate programs.

1. Department of Ethics Education - Through lessons Ethics and theories, students develop their honest and learn to follow moral codes that will be used as an elementary teacher. Students are expected to expand their creative thinking and sense of logic.
2. Department of Korean Language Education - Students learn about teaching skills and learning strategies of Korean language. The program focuses not only on four basic skills (speaking, listen, reading and writing), but expands the curriculum further to linguistics and literature parts of Korean language education.
3. Department of Social Studies Education - Students expand their knowledge and teaching methods on geography, history and general social studies. The program offers field trips to establish better understanding of Korea.
4. Department of Mathematics Education - The program focuses on developing knowledge of pure mathematics (algebra, geometry, analysis, statistics, etc.) as well as mathematics education, which includes subjects such as psychology of mathematics education and history of mathematics education.
5. Department of Science Education - The contents are taught on a wide range of physics, chemistry, biology and earth science. The program values hands-on experience and the relation with the latest scientific theory.
6. Department of Practical Arts Education - The program aims to teach the understanding of work/environment and strengthening students’ life skills and ultimately, the meaning of work through art. The students of this program are exposed to learn about the relationships between family and surrounding environments
7. Department of Physical Education - The program aims to helps students to become ideal teachers through having solid basic theories of physical education, nature physical science and also through practical skills.
8. Department of Music Education - The program focuses on two parts. First part is basic skills such as singing, Korean traditional music and composing. Second part is musical theory knowledge and teaching methods.
9. Department of Fine Art Education - Teaching methods and materials in elementary fine arts education are introduced. Understanding the art theory and developing art abilities will guide students to be ideal teachers.
10. Department of English Language Education - The program views developing communication skills and various teaching methods as the most important aspects. It also focuses on the theoretical background to help understanding in English culture.
11. Department of Elementary Education - It focuses on problems that are arising in elementary education. The program helps in solving problems through theories and practices to establish close relationships with classroom.
12. Department of Computer Education - Through various courses such as Computer Education, Research Methods in Computer Education, Computer Programming, and Data Structure etc. students will be able to develop the understanding of computer education theories and computer skills.

== See also ==
- List of national universities in South Korea
- List of universities and colleges in South Korea
- Education in Korea
