= Korea National University of Welfare =

University in Pyeongtaek, South Korea

Coordinates: 37°03′06″N 127°05′42″E

- Other name: KNUW
- Motto: 사람을 배운다
- Motto in English: Learning about Human
- Type: National; Junior college
- Established: 2001
- President: Lee, Sangjin, Ph.D.
- Faculty: 57 (2017)
- Administrative staff: 78 (2017)
- Undergraduates: 858 (2017)
- Location: Pyeontaek, Gyeonggi-do, South Korea
- Website: eng.knuw.ac.kr

Korean name
- Hangul: 한국복지대학교
- Hanja: 韓國福祉大學校
- RR: Hanguk bokji daehakgyo
- MR: Han'guk pokchi taehakkyo

Korea National University of Welfare (Korean: 한국복지대학교) is a national university located in Pyeongtaek, South Korea.

== See also ==
- List of national universities in South Korea
- List of universities and colleges in South Korea
- Education in Korea
