= South Chungcheong Province =

Province of South Korea

- Province
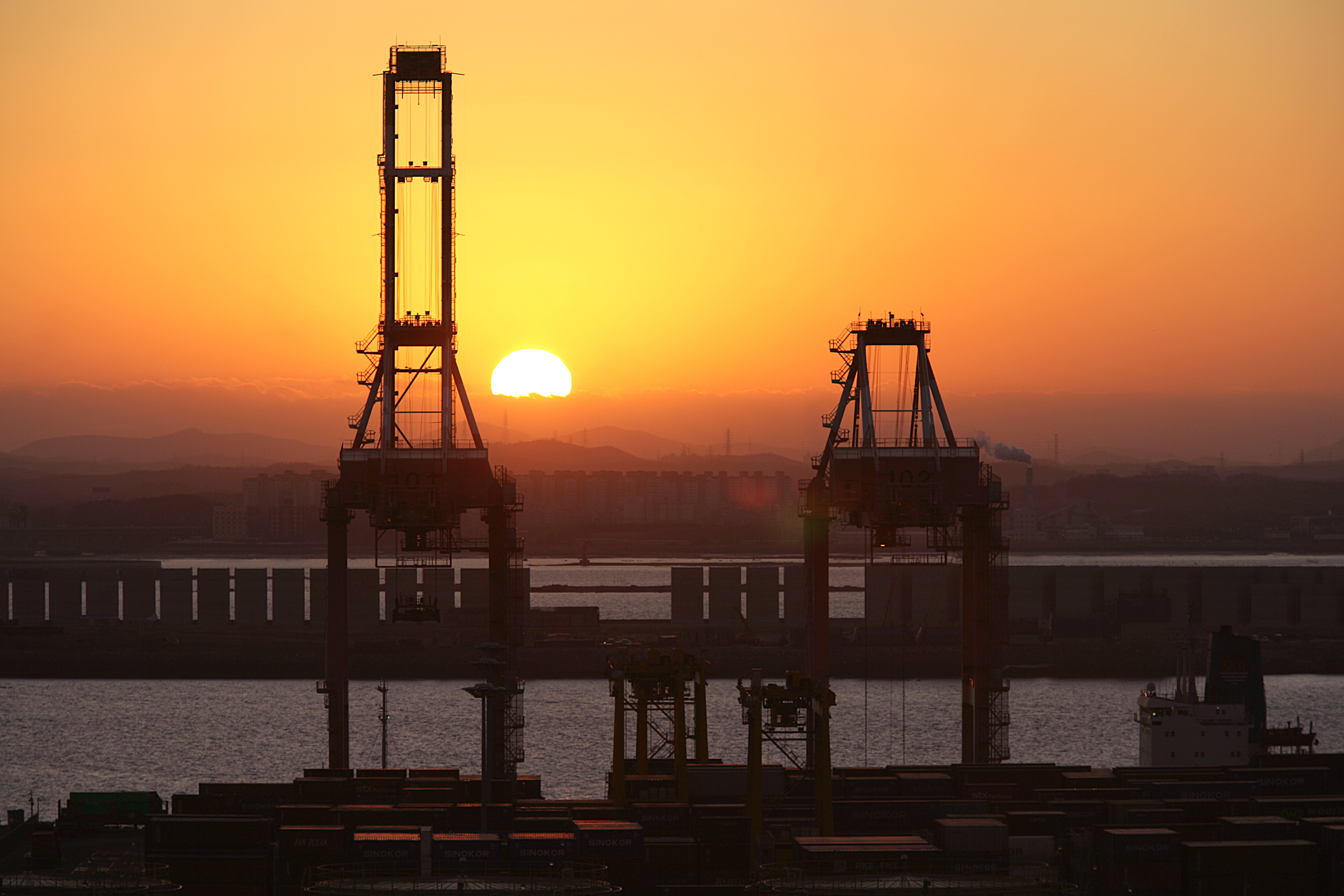
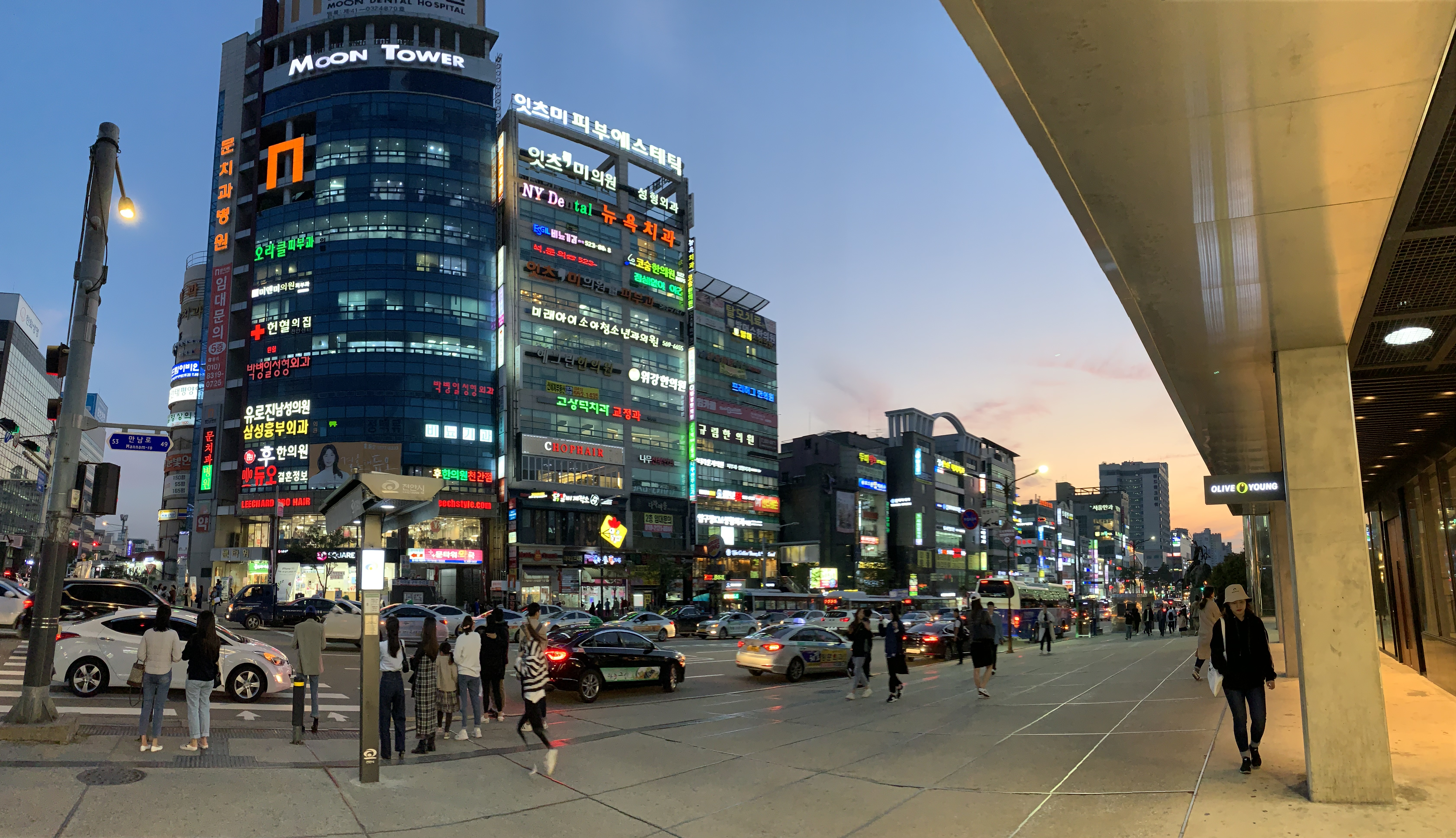
- From the left: Dangjin and Cheonan

- Flag Logo

- Coordinates: 36°30′N 126°45′E
- Country: South Korea
- Region: Hoseo
- Largest city: Cheonan
- Capital: Hongseong County
- Subdivisions: 8 cities; 7 counties

Government
  - Governor: Park Soo-hyun (Democratic)

Area
  - Total: 8,226.14 km^{2} (3,176.13 sq mi)
  - Rank: 6th

Population (2022)
  - Total: 2,123,037
  - Rank: 4th
  - Density: 258.08/km^{2} (668.4/sq mi)

Metropolitan Symbols

GDP (Nominal, 2023)
  - Total: KRW 143 trillion (US$ 114 billion)
  - Per capita: US$ 58,937
- ISO 3166 code: KR-44
- Dialect: Chungcheong
- Website: Official website (English)

Korean name
- Hangul: 충청남도
- Hanja: 忠淸南道
- RR: Chungcheongnam-do
- MR: Ch'ungch'ŏngnam-do

Short name
- Hangul: 충남
- Hanja: 忠南
- RR: Chungnam
- MR: Ch'ungnam

South Chungcheong Province (Korean: 충청남도, Korean pronunciation: [tɕʰuŋ.tɕʰʌŋ.nam.do]), also known as Chungnam (충남), is a province of South Korea in the Hoseo region in the southwest of the Korean Peninsula. South Chungcheong borders the provinces of Gyeonggi to the north, North Chungcheong, Sejong Special Self-governing City, and Daejeon Metropolitan City to the east, and North Jeolla to the south.

Hongseong County is the capital and Cheonan is the largest city of South Chungcheong, with other major cities including Asan, Seosan, and Dangjin. Daejeon was the largest city of South Chungcheong until becoming a Metropolitan City in 1989, and the historic capital until the provincial government was relocated to Hongseong in 2012.

South Chungcheong was established in 1896 from the province of Chungcheong, one of the Eight Provinces of Korea, consisting of the southwestern half of the territory. South Chungcheong was known as Chūsei-nan Prefecture during the Japanese Colonial Period from 1910 and became part of South Korea following the division of Korea in 1945.

== Overview ==
Chungcheongnam-do is South Korea's richest province, with a 2012 GDP per capita of $56,133. It is by far South Korea's fastest growing region, with an average GDP growth of 9.7% in 2001-2007 that accelerated to 12.4% in 2010. Such rapid growth transformed it from a mostly agricultural to a highly industrialized economy in the 21st century.

Along with Gangwon, Chungnam is the only province outside the Seoul Capital Area to be served by the Seoul Metropolitan Subway, with Seoul Subway Line 1 passing Cheonan and Asan. Multimillion-dollar projects are being developed, such as New Asan City centered on the newly built Cheonan-Asan Station that connects Chungnam's largest city, Cheonan, to Seoul Station in less than 30 minutes via the KTX bullet train.

The area code of the province is 041.

== Demographics ==
Historical population
Year	Pop.	±%
1980	2,152,260	—
1990	2,013,926	−6.4%
2000	1,845,321	−8.4%
2010	2,028,002	+9.9%
2020	2,176,636	+7.3%

Religion in South Chungcheong province (2024)
1. Not religious (51.0%)
2. Buddhism (17.0%)
3. Protestantism (21.0%)
4. Catholicism (10.0%)
5. Others (2.00%)

== Geography ==
The province is part of the Hoseo region, and is bounded to the west by the Yellow Sea, to the north by Gyeonggi-do province, to the south by Jeollabuk-do province, and to the east by Chungcheongbuk-do province. Its area is 8,204 km^{2} (3,168 sq mi) as of 2012.

== Resources ==
One third of the province's area is under cultivation. Aside from agriculture, marine products are of importance. There are 220 square kilometres (85 mi^{2}) of exposed beach which is used to produce salt by solar evaporation. There is coal mining, but gold and silver mines are also found in Chungcheongnam-do, as is Monazite (a rare thorium bearing mineral) and zircon.

In 2018, South Chungcheong province was home to half of South Korea's coal-fired power generation capacity. That year, it became the first Asian member of the Powering Past Coal Alliance, and committed to ending the use of coal power to mitigate global warming and reduce air pollution.

== Attractions ==
At 845 metres, Mount Gyeryong is the most notable elevation. It is located in a national park which is noted for its unique rock features. Apart from the stone formations there are a number of old temples. These include Gwanchok-sa, a temple which is home to the largest stone Buddha in Korea. In 1978 the Taean Marine National Park was opened. It includes some of the country's best bathing beaches, and Cheollipo Arboretum which was created in 1966 by C. Ferris Miller and contains approximately 14,000 different plant species, including some rare and endangered species.

== Sejong City ==
In early 2007, the Republic of Korea government decided to create a special administrative district out of part of the present Chungcheongnam-do Province, near what is now Daejeon. The new district was named Sejong Special Self-Governing City, and was to replace Seoul as the future capital of the Republic of Korea. However, in 2009, it was determined that replacing Seoul as new national capital would violate the South Korean Constitution by Constitution Court. Now Sejong City may only serve as a National Administrative Capital and Secondary capital alongside Seoul, representing about 36 government ministers and agencies, including the Prime Minister's office, as of 2015.

== Administrative divisions ==
Chungcheongnam-do is currently divided into 8 cities (si) and 7 counties (gun). The city and county names below are given in English, Hangul, and Hanja.

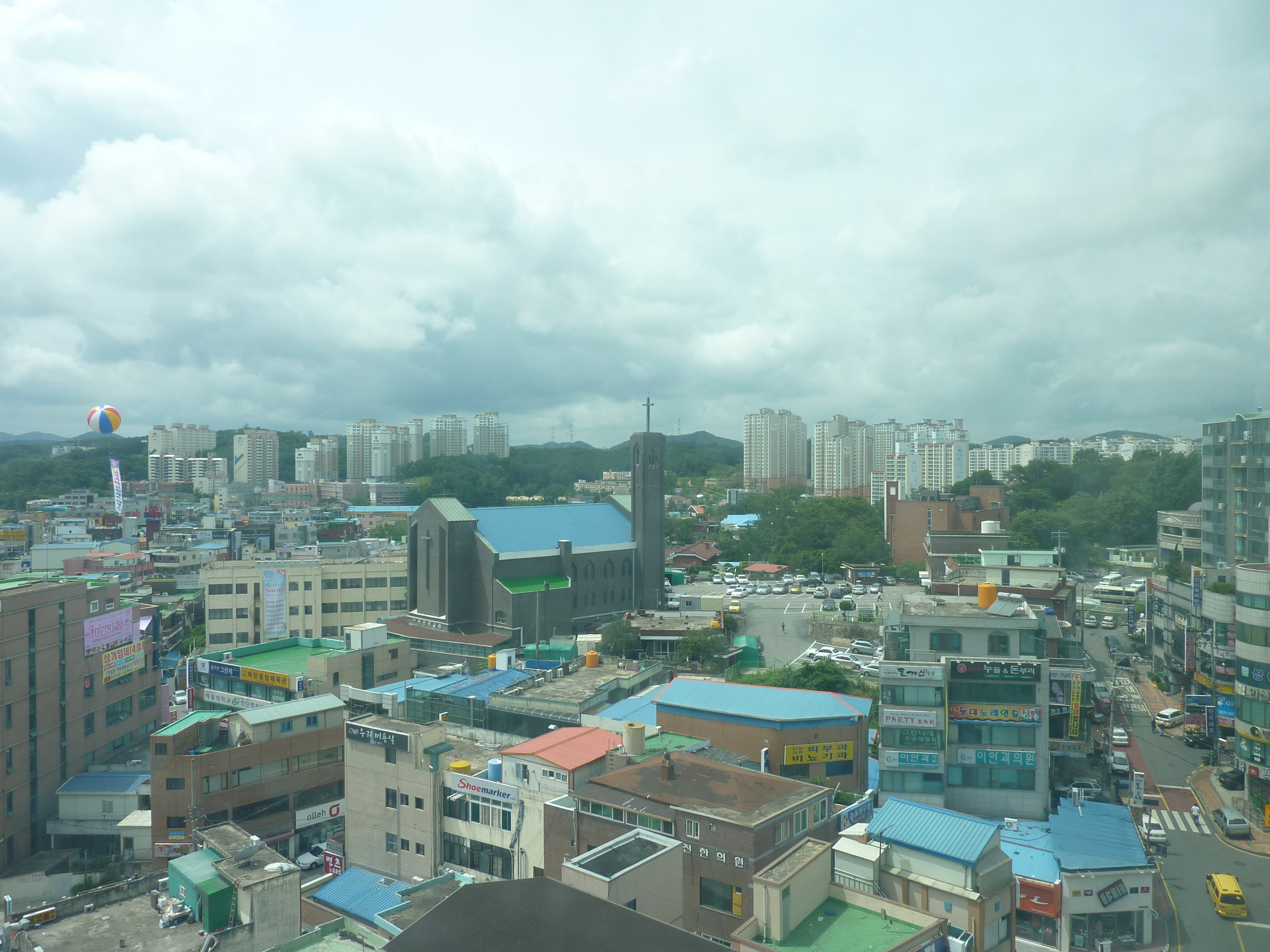
Dangjin

Map	#	Name	Hangul	Hanja	Population (2024)	Subdivisions
— Specific City —
	1	Cheonan	천안시	天安市	658,831	2 ilban-gu — 4 eup, 8 myeon, 18 haengjeong-dong
— City —
	2	Asan	아산시	牙山市	356,603	2 eup, 9 myeon, 6 haengjeong-dong
	3	Seosan	서산시	瑞山市	175,144	1 eup, 9 myeon, 5 haengjeong-dong
	4	Dangjin	당진시	唐津市	171,213	2 eup, 9 myeon, 3 haengjeong-dong
	5	Gongju	공주시	公州市	101,695	1 eup, 9 myeon, 6 haengjeong-dong
	6	Nonsan	논산시	論山市	108,883	2 eup, 11 myeon, 2 haengjeong-dong
	7	Boryeong	보령시	保寧市	94,191	1 eup, 10 myeon, 5 haengjeong-dong
	8	Gyeryong	계룡시	雞龍市	46,687	3 myeon, 1 haengjeong-dong
— County —
	9	Hongseong County	홍성군	洪城郡	98,886	2 eup, 9 myeon
	10	Yesan County	예산군	禮山郡	85,626	2 eup, 10 myeon
	11	Buyeo County	부여군	扶餘郡	72,959	1 eup, 15 myeon
	12	Seocheon County	서천군	舒川郡	58,740	2 eup, 11 myeon
	13	Taean County	태안군	泰安郡	62,519	2 eup, 6 myeon
	14	Geumsan County	금산군	錦山郡	55,433	1 eup, 9 myeon
	15	Cheongyang County	청양군	靑陽郡	32,105	1 eup, 9 myeon

== Religion ==
Religion in Chungcheongnam-do (2015)
1. Not religious (58.6%)
2. Protestantism (20.7%)
3. Buddhism (13.8%)
4. Catholicism (6.10%)
5. Other (0.80%)

According to the 2015 census, 13.8% of the population follows Buddhism and 26.8% follow Christianity (20.7% Protestantism and 6.1% Catholicism). 58.6% of the population is not religious and 0.8% of the population follows other religions.

== Education ==
- Kongju National University
- Gongju National University of Education
- Korea National University of Cultural Heritage
- Dankook university in Cheonan
- Baekseok University
- Soonchunhyang University in Asan
- GEONYANG University in Nonsan
- Korea University of Technology and Education in Cheonan
- Hanseo University

== Twin towns – sister cities ==
Chungcheongnam-do is twinned with:

- Balıkesir, Turkey
- Huế, Vietnam
