= Jeonju National University of Education =

University in Jeonju, South Korea

Coordinates: 35°48′30″N 127°09′18″E

- Type: National
- Location: Jeonju, Jeollabuk-do, South Korea
- Website: http://www.jnue.ac.kr/eng/

Korean name
- Hangul: 전주교육대학교
- Hanja: 全州敎育大學校
- RR: Jeonju gyoyuk daehakgyo
- MR: Chŏnju kyoyuk taehakkyo

Jeonju National University of Education (Korean: 전주교육대학교), established in 1923, is a public institution located in Jeonju, South Korea. It focuses on training elementary school teachers and supporting the country's educational system.

== Academic programs ==
The Jeonju National University of Education (JNUE) offers undergraduate and graduate programs specializing in elementary education. Its curriculum aims to provide students with the skills and knowledge required for teaching in primary education settings.

== Admissions ==
JNUE has a selective admission policy, with an acceptance rate of approximately 30%. Prospective students are typically required to undergo entrance examinations as part of the selection process.

== Alumni ==
Notable alumni of the Jeonju National University of Education (JNUE) include Park Beom-shin, a prominent author recognized for his contributions to Korean literature.

== See also ==
- List of national universities in South Korea
- List of universities and colleges in South Korea
- Education in Korea
