= Chuncheon National University of Education =

University in Chuncheon, South Korea

- 춘천교육대학교
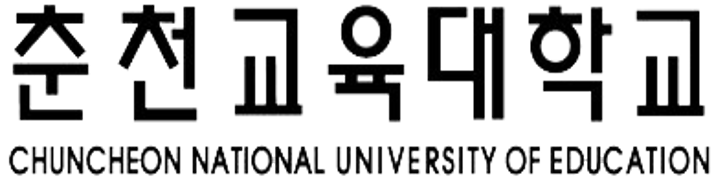
- President: Park Seong-seon (박성선)
- Location: Chuncheon, South Korea; 37.85961°N 127.74879°E
- Website: www.cnue.ac.kr/eng_new/index.do

- Chuncheon National University of Education
- Hangul: 춘천교육대학교
- Hanja: 春川敎育大學校
- RR: Chuncheon gyoyuk daehakgyo
- MR: Ch'unch'ŏn kyoyuk taehakkyo

Chuncheon National University of Education (CNUE; Korean: 춘천교육대학교) is one of the 10 national universities of education in South Korea. It provides training to future educators, primarily those bound for the primary level of the country's public education system. The campus is located in Chuncheon City, the capital of Gangwon province in the country's northeast. 1,294 undergraduate students and 371 graduate students are enrolled as of 1 April 2022. The current president is JuHan Lee (이주한).

== Academics ==
CNUE offers focused instruction in each of the main content areas of the public-school curriculum. In addition, the graduate school offers master's degrees in each of these fields. CNUE’s various academic departments offer 12 undergraduate programs, all of which consist of 141 units of course weight and 8 weeks of practicum. Upon completing the programs, students will earn a Bachelor of Education degree and elementary school teacher certification. CNUE has a two-semester system with the first term beginning at the start of March and ending in mid-June and the second usually running from late August until mid-December. Each semester is 15 weeks long.

== History ==
CNUE was founded in 1939 as "Chuncheon Normal School" (춘천사범학교). It was redesignated as a two-year teacher's college in 1962, and became a four-year college in 1983. It gained university status in 1983, and opened its graduate school in 1996.

- 1939 Founded as Chuncheon Normal School
- 1952 Affiliated elementary school opens
- 1962 Granted a two-year college status
- 1983 Elevated to a four-year university
- 1996 Graduate school opens
- 1998 Selected as the best university of education by Korean Council for University Education
- 2004 CNUE R&D Foundation opens
- 2007 Selected as the best university of education by Korean Ministry of Education
- 2009 Pine Hall-M&F (student residence) constructed
- 2013 Teacher Training Center for Invention Education opens
- 2014 New library opens
- 2018 Received the highest grade in National University Innovation Project
- 2019 International practicum program starts under the agreement with Toronto District School Board

== See also ==
- List of national universities in South Korea
- List of universities and colleges in South Korea
- Education in Korea
