= Gyeongbuk Provincial College =

- 경북도립대학교 (慶北道立大學校)
- Type: Public
- Established: 1997
- Location: Yecheon, North Gyeongsang, South Korea
- Website: Official website

Korean name
- Hangul: 경북도립대학교
- Hanja: 慶北道立大學校
- RR: Gyeongbuk dorip daehakgyo
- MR: Kyŏngbuk torip taehakkyo

Gyeongbuk Provincial College is the only provincial college in Daegu and Gyeongbuk. The predecessor of Gyeongbuk Provincial College is Yecheon Junior College, established in 1997. At the time of its establishment, the university consisted of eight departments, both in the automotive and civil engineering fields. Yecheon Junior College changed its name to Gyeong Province College in 1998. In 2008, Gyeong Province College changed its name to Gyeongbuk Provincial College.

== See also ==
- List of national universities in South Korea
- List of universities and colleges in South Korea
- Education in Korea

== See also ==
- List of universities and colleges in South Korea
