= Cheongju National University of Education =

South Korean national university

- Type: Public
- Established: 1941
- President: Su-Hwan Kim
- Academic staff: 55
- Location: Cheongju, North Chungcheong, South Korea; 36.61611°N 127.48463°E
- Website: http://www.cje.ac.kr/

- Cheongju National University of Education
- Hangul: 청주교육대학교
- Hanja: 淸州敎育大學校
- RR: Cheongju gyoyuk daehakgyo
- MR: Ch'ŏngju kyoyuk taehakkyo

Cheongju National University of Education (Korean: 청주교육대학교) is a national university of education in South Korea. It provides training to teachers, particularly those who plan to teach in public elementary schools. The campus is located in Cheongju City, the capital of North Chungcheong province. Campus facilities include a lab school, library, and broadcasting center. The current president is Su-Hwan Kim. The school employs around 55 professors.

== Academics ==
At the undergraduate level, the course of study is divided between general academics and study specific to teaching. The academic departments cover most of the recognized specializations of public-school teaching, namely: Computer Education, English Education, Elementary Education, Practical Arts Education, Fine Arts Education, Music Education, Physical Education, Science Education, Mathematics Education, Social Studies Education, Korean Education, and Ethics Education.

== History ==
The school was founded in 1941 as Cheongju Public Normal School (청주사범학교). It was incorporated into the national education system of the new Republic of Korea in 1950. In 1962, the curriculum was expanded from one year to two years in length, and the school was renamed Cheongju National Teachers' Junior College. It was reorganized as a four-year college in 1984, and again as a university of education in 1993. The graduate school opened in 1996.

== See also ==
- Cheongju University (another nearby university)
- List of national universities in South Korea
- List of universities and colleges in South Korea
- Education in Korea
