= Gyeongnam Provincial Namhae College =

- 경남도립남해대학
- Type: Public College
- Established: 1970
- President: Hong Deok Soo
- Location: Namhae, South Gyeongsang, South Korea
- Website: Official website

Korean name
- Hangul: 경남도립남해대학
- Hanja: 慶南道立南海大學
- RR: Gyeongnam dorip Namhae daehak
- MR: Kyŏngnam torip Namhae taehak

The Gyeongnam Provincial Namhae College is South Korea's first provincial university founded by South Gyeongsang Province aimed at fostering specialized talents in the region in March 1996.

It was opened in March 1996, receiving accreditation for the Namhae Junior College in November 1994. In April 1999, it opened a lifelong education institute. In January 2013, it signed a treaty with China's Shanghai Business School.

There are nine departments, tourism, hotel cooking, shipbuilding, mechatronics, electronics, computer software engineering, business practices, Financial accounting practices, and tourism landscape design.

== See also ==
- List of national universities in South Korea
- List of universities and colleges in South Korea
- Education in Korea

== See also ==
- List of universities and colleges in South Korea
