= Gyeongnam Provincial Geochang College =

University in Geochang, South Korea

- Type: Public
- Established: june, 1994
- Location: Geochang, South Gyeongsang, South Korea
- Website: www.gc.ac.kr

- Gyeongnam Provincial Geochang College
- Hangul: 경남도립거창대학
- Hanja: 慶南道立居昌大學
- RR: Gyeongnam dorip Geochang daehak
- MR: Kyŏngnam torip Kŏch'ang taehak

Geochang Provincial College (Korean: 경남도립거창대학) is a public university located in Geochang, South Korea.

== See also ==
- List of national universities in South Korea
- List of universities and colleges in South Korea
- Education in Korea
