= Mokpo National Maritime University =

Educational institution in South Korea

- 국립목포해양대학교
- Motto: 진리탐구•성실봉사•해양개척
- Motto in English: The pursuit of truth, Service with sincerity, The scientific exploitation of oceans
- Type: National
- Established: April 5, 1950
- President: Park Sung-hyeon
- Students: 2,911 (2018)
- Location: Mokpo, South Korea; 34.792°N 126.365°E
- Mascot: Dolphin
- Website: www.mmu.ac.kr/eng

Korean name
- Hangul: 목포해양대학교
- Hanja: 木浦海洋大學校
- RR: Mokpo haeyang daehakgyo
- MR: Mokp'o haeyang taehakkyo

Mokpo National Maritime University is a national university located in Mokpo, South Korea.

== Organization ==
=== University Headquarters ===
- Office of Academic Affairs
- Office of Admissions and Student Affairs
- Office of Planning Affairs
- Office of Administrative Affairs

=== Affiliated Departments ===
- Office of Industry-Academic Cooperation Foundation
- Office of Training and Recruitment
- International Exchange & Education Center
- LINC(Leaders in INdustry-university Cooperation)+ Agency
- Startup Support Foundation
- The Support Center for Teacher Education
- Human Right Center
- Seafarers Policy Research Center
- Library
- Information Computing Center
- Training Ship
- Cadet Dormitory
- Residence Hall
- Office of GPS Professional Development
- Student Counseling Center
- The School of Lifelong Education
- Marine Simulation Center
- Marine Engineering Workshop
- Marine Leports Center
- Regional Communication Center
- Museum
- Marine Industry Research Institute
- Research Institute of Mechanics & Electronics
- NAVY ROTC

== Academics ==
=== College of Maritime Sciences ===
==== Division of Navigation Science ====
- Department of Nautical Science
- Department of Ship Operation
- Department of Maritime Traffic Management
- Department of Marine Safety System

==== Division of Maritime Transportation ====
- Department of Nautical Science
- Department of Logistic System
- Department of Shipping Management
- Department of Autonomous Operations for Smart Ship

==== Division of Navigation and Information System ====
- Department of Nautical Science
- Department of Information Communication

==== Division of Marine Engineering System ====
- Department of Marine Engineering
- Department of Mechanical Application
- Department of Electric & Control Engineering

==== Division of Coast Guard ====
- Department of Marine Engineering
- Department of Ocean Power System
- Department of Marine Police Science

==== Division of Marine Mechatronics ====
- Department of Marine Engineering
- Department of Electromechanical Engineering

==== Division of Naval Officer Science ====
- Department of Nautical Science
- Department of Marine Engineering
- Department of Military Science

=== College of Maritime Engineering ===
- Department of Computer Engineering
- Department of Naval Architecture & Ocean Engineering
- Department of Environmental Engineering & Biotechnology
- Department of Ocean Civil Engineering

=== Graduate schools ===
- Department of Maritime Transportation System
- Department of Marine Engineering
- Department of Coast guard
- Department of Ocean System Engineering
- Department of Marine Electronics and Communication and Computer Engineering

== Major Organizations of University ==
=== Office of Academic Affairs ===
The office is composed of the Faculty Affairs Team and the Student Affairs Team in charge of faculty HR, faculty performance management, academic/research support, issuance of faculty certificates, operation of education courses and academic schedules, management of classes and school records, awarding of degrees, etc.

=== Office of Admissions and Student Affairs ===
Responsible for selecting students and supporting the school life of enrolled students

=== Office of Planning Affairs ===
In preparation of the internalization, openness and specialization of the educational environment in the 21st century, it is in charge of establishing comprehensive plans for university development, and presenting directions of the university development through the improvement of various evaluations and systems on university operation and the implementation of government financing projects.

=== Office of Administrative Affairs ===
Responsible for supporting each administrative department to facilitate educational activities such as HR and service management, faculty payroll and welfare, budget execution, product purchase and management, facility construction and maintenance, etc.

=== Office of Training and Recruitment ===
In accordance with the standards (STCW Convention) set by the International Maritime Organization (IMO), it is in charge of supporting students' boarding practices and trainings, supporting safe operation of training ships and supporting students' employment.

=== Office of International Affairs ===
The officefocuses on improving students' foreign language skills in line with the era of internationalization and is in charge of language training to educate Korean culture to foreign students for the globalization of the campus.

=== Industry-Academic Cooperation Foundation ===
A special corporation established under 「the Act on Industrial Education Promotion and Industry-Academic Cooperation Promotion」 to promote and develop industrial-academic cooperation researches and projects of the university and is in charge of managing industrial-academic cooperation projects of the university and systematically supporting industrial-academic cooperation activities.

== History ==
=== 1950-2000 ===
1950. 04. 05 University was founded as Mokpo fisheries and Marine High School.

1979. 03. 01 Promoted to Mokpo Merchant Marine College.

1993. 03. 01 Upgrade to Mokpo National Maritime University. (3 Departments : Nautical Science, Marine Engineering Science, Communication Science)

1995. 03. 01 Two new Departments were added. (Marine Electronic Engineering Science, Naval Architecture & Ocean Engineering Science)

1996. 03. 01 University was reorganized into 4 Division. (Maritime Transportation System, Marine Engineering, Marine Electronics and Communication Engineering, Ocean System Engineering)

1997. 03. 01 TGraduate School was established.

1999. 03. 01 Department of Maritime Police Science was established in the divisions of Marine Engineering and Maritime Transportain System. Doctoral program was established in Graduate school.

=== 2001-2010 ===
2001. 07. 26 Industrial graduate school was established.

2002. 11. 09 Department of Computer Science & Engineering was added to the division of Marine Electronics and communication Engineering

2003. 04. 25 Training ship SAENURI was started on a voyage.

2003. 07. 07 MMU Lifelong Education Program was established.

2004. 08. 03 Residence Hall was completed.

2005. 06. 16 Marine Simulation Center was established.

2006. 01. 05 MMU Honam Sea Grant College Program was established.

2007. 01. 07 MMU Language Education Center was established

2007. 10. 01 MMU New Main Building was officially opened.

2008. 10. 28 Opened the Marine Poetry Monument Park.

2009. 01. 30 Opened the University History Hall.

2009. 05. 14 Opened Jeonnam Branch of Korea Marine Equipment Research Institute.

=== 2011-2020 ===
2011. 03. 01 Established colleges (College of Maritime Sciences and College of Maritime Engineering).

2011. 08. 31 Completed the new construction of Cadet Dormitory (a total of 10 floors, 8,953 m^{2} of gross area and 420 rooms).

2011. 09. 23 Opened Jeonnam Yachting License Test Center.

2012. 03. 01 Reorganized into 3 divisions (College of Maritime Sciences) and 6 departments (College of Maritime Engineering) and established Women's School Corps.

2013. 07. 11 Selected as a university sponsored for education capacity enhancement project for 6 consecutive years.

2014. 07. 11 Completed the new library building (3 floors and 1 basement, 4,800 m^{2} of gross area)

2015. 06. 29 Completed Ocean Engineering Building, Marine College of Maritime Engineering (4 floors and 1 basement, 6,834 m^{2} of gross area)

2016. 04. 07 Approval of the establishment of Division of Naval Officer Science from Ministry of Education.

2017. 03. 15 Completed the small-ship station facility.

2018. 03. 01 Selected as a university of education internalization competency certification

2018. 06. 19 Confirmation of the North-port port facility reserve (2 lots, 160,821 m^{2}) for the university land

2018. 08. 31 Built Student Hall (4 floors, 5,373 m^{2} of gross area)

2018. 12. 27 Delivery and launch of training ship, SEGERO

2019. 06. 26 Started the construction of Ship Repair Supporting Center (2,913 m^{2} of gross area)

2020. 02. 11 Completed Ship Repair Supporting Center

== Specialized Fields of University ==
=== Special-purposed national university for educating marine-engineer manpower ===
- Marine-specialization education-oriented university
- Raising professional manpower for realizing maritime power country
- Raising the manpower of maritime transport accounting for 99.7% of the international logistics
- Serving as the 4th army in the event of national emergency

=== National support for marine special-purpose university ===
- National funding such as some tuition, accommodation and clothing
- Mandatory Cadet Dormitory adaptation training
- Applying military service exemption to mandatory boarding
- Two state-of-the-art training ships and operation support

=== Curriculum management with STCW international convention under the UN ===
- Operation of curriculum that meets the international standards
- Feedback through 5-year cycle assessment on international marine engineering quality

=== Major Achievements ===
- Employment rate of 2019: 80.6% (based on 2018 graduates)
- Producing civil servants in the marine and fisheries sector
- Selected as an accredited university for capacity certification on internationalization of education
- Selected as an autonomous improvement university for university's basic competency diagnosis
- Approval of teacher training program
- Selected for step 2 project of the Social Customization Department (LINC+) of the Ministry of Education
- Confirmation of the North-port facility site reserve as the university land (2 lots, 160,821 m^{2})
- Acquisition of the 2nd cycle university institution assessment certification

== See also ==
- List of national universities in South Korea
- List of universities and colleges in South Korea
- Education in Korea
