= Chungbuk Provincial College =

University in Okcheon, South Korea

- 충북도립대학
- Type: Public College
- Location: South Korea; 36.30050°N 127.57356°E
- Website: www.cpu.ac.kr

- Chungbuk Provincial College
- Hangul: 충북도립대학
- Hanja: 忠北道立大學
- RR: Chungbuk dorip daehak
- MR: Ch'ungbuk torip taehak

The campus of Chungbuk Provincial University of Science and Technology (Korean: 충북도립대학) lies in Okcheon County, North Chungcheong Province, South Korea. It employs about 25 professors, providing instruction in a variety of technical fields. The current president is Jin-Young, Lee.

== Academics ==
All course offerings are at the undergraduate level, and are made through the school's nine departments: Biotechnology, E-Commerce, Foods & Life Science, Electronics & Information, Computer Information, Visual Communication Design, Environmental Engineering, Energy Systems, and Precision Mechanical Engineering.

== History ==
Discussions between the Ministry of Education and the provincial government about establishing the school were an election promise made in the country's elections of 1992, which brought Kim Young-sam to power. These discussions actually began in late 1994, and official permission to establish the college was granted in 1996; construction on the campus began early the following year. The school opened its doors in 1998.

== See also ==
- List of national universities in South Korea
- List of universities and colleges in South Korea
- Education in Korea
