= Korea National University of Agriculture and Fisheries =

Agricultural school in Jeonju, South Korea

- 한국농수산대학교
- Type: National
- President: Kim, Namsu
- Academic staff: 101
- Undergraduates: 979
- Location: Jeonju, Jeollabuk-do, Republic of Korea; 35.827°N 127.065°E
- Colors: Maroon, blue
- Website: https://www.af.ac.kr/index.9is

- Korea National University of Agriculture and Fisheries
- Hangul: 한국농수산대학교
- Hanja: 韓國農水產大學校
- RR: Hanguk nongsusan daehakgyo
- MR: Han'guk nongsusan taehakkyo

Korea National University of Agriculture and Fisheries (Acronym: KNUAF; Korean: 한국농수산대학교) is a national university founded in 1997. located in Jeonju, South Korea.

== See also ==
- List of national universities in South Korea
- List of universities and colleges in South Korea
- Education in Korea
