= North Jeolla Province =

Province of South Korea

Coordinates: 35°49′N 127°09′E

Jeonbuk State Jeonbuk Special Self-Governing Province
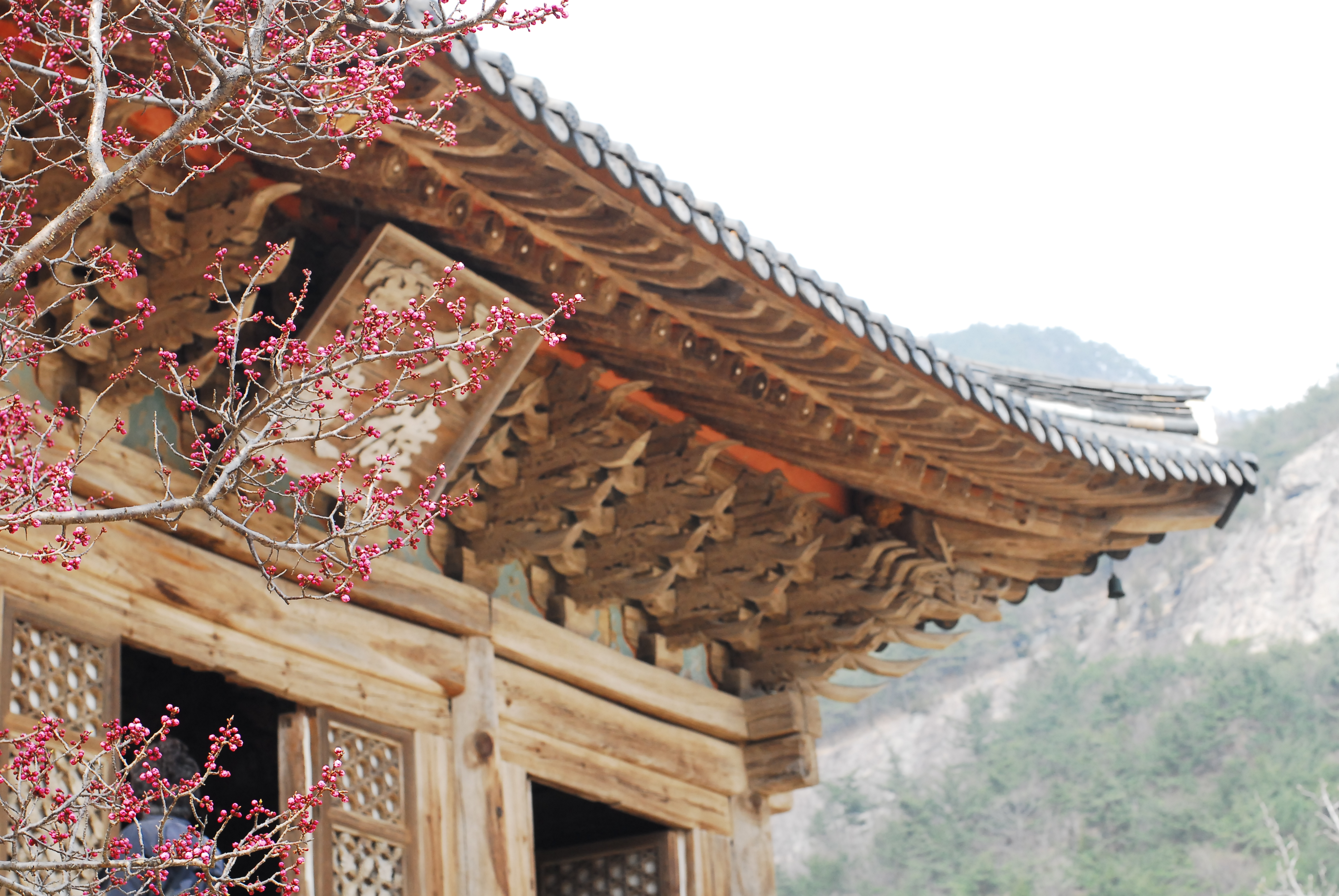
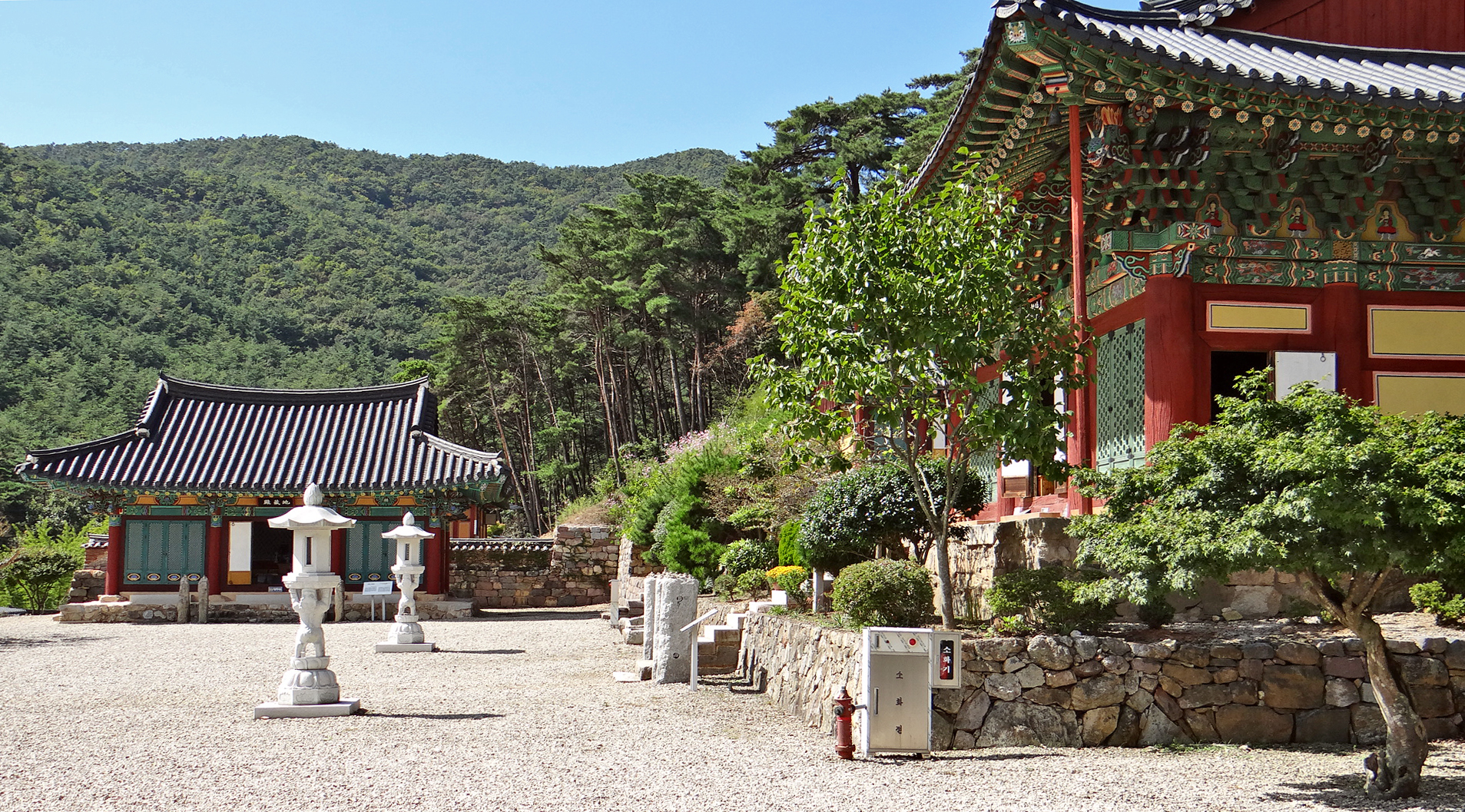
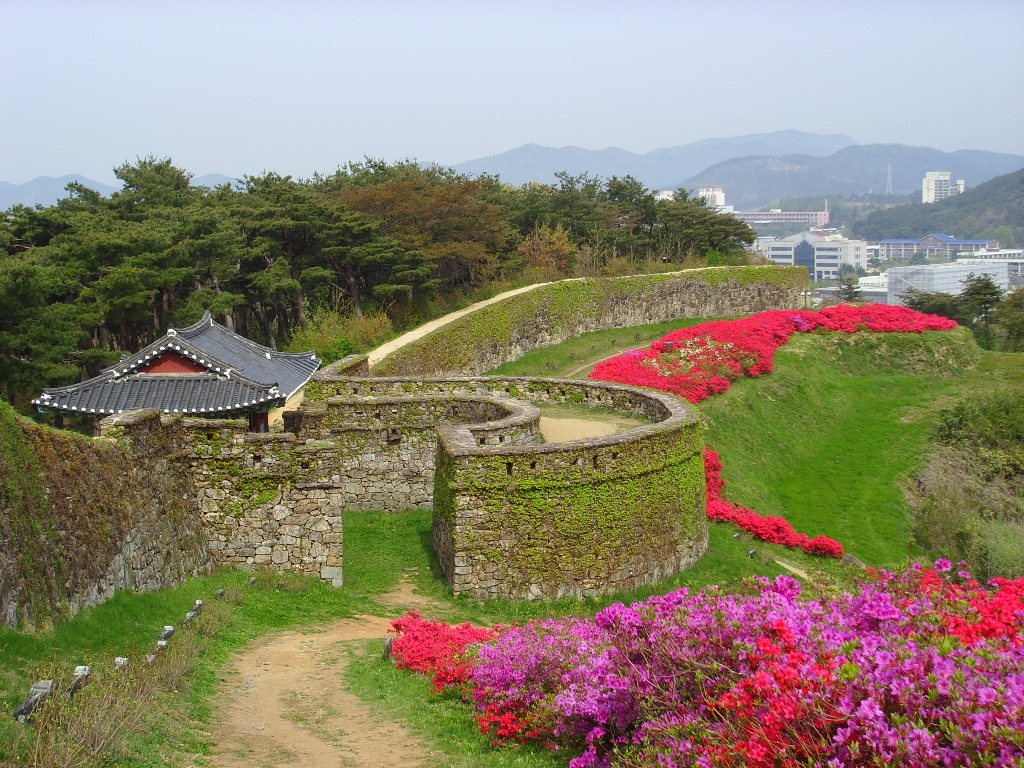
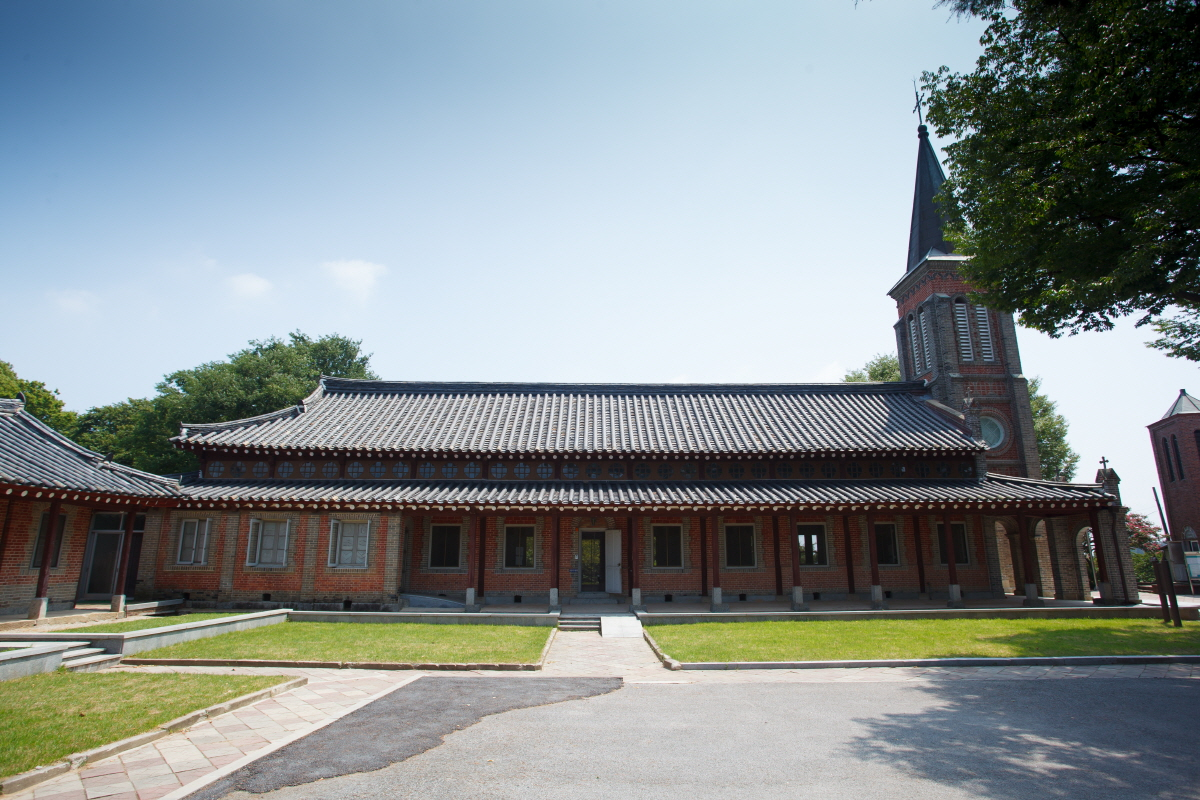
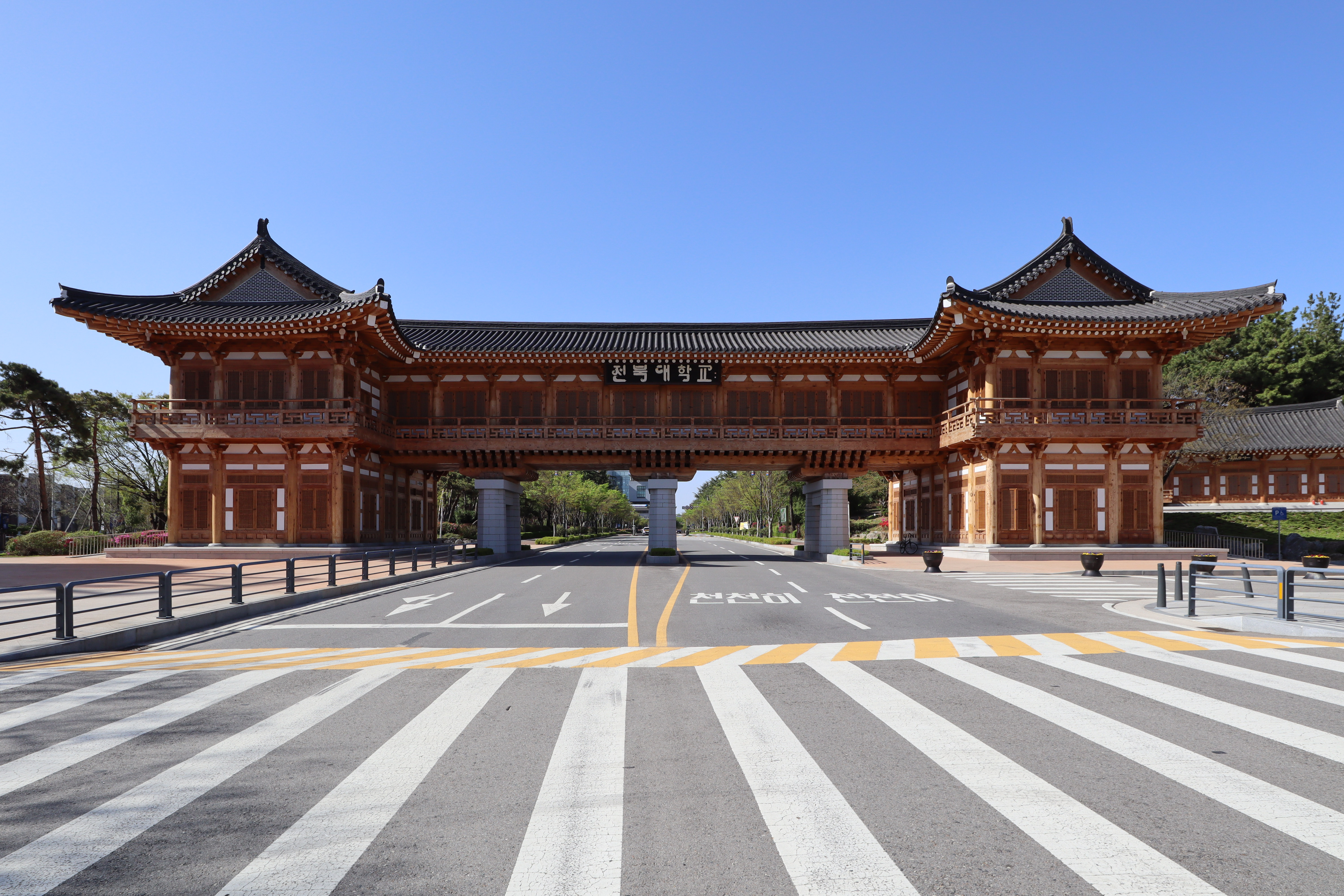
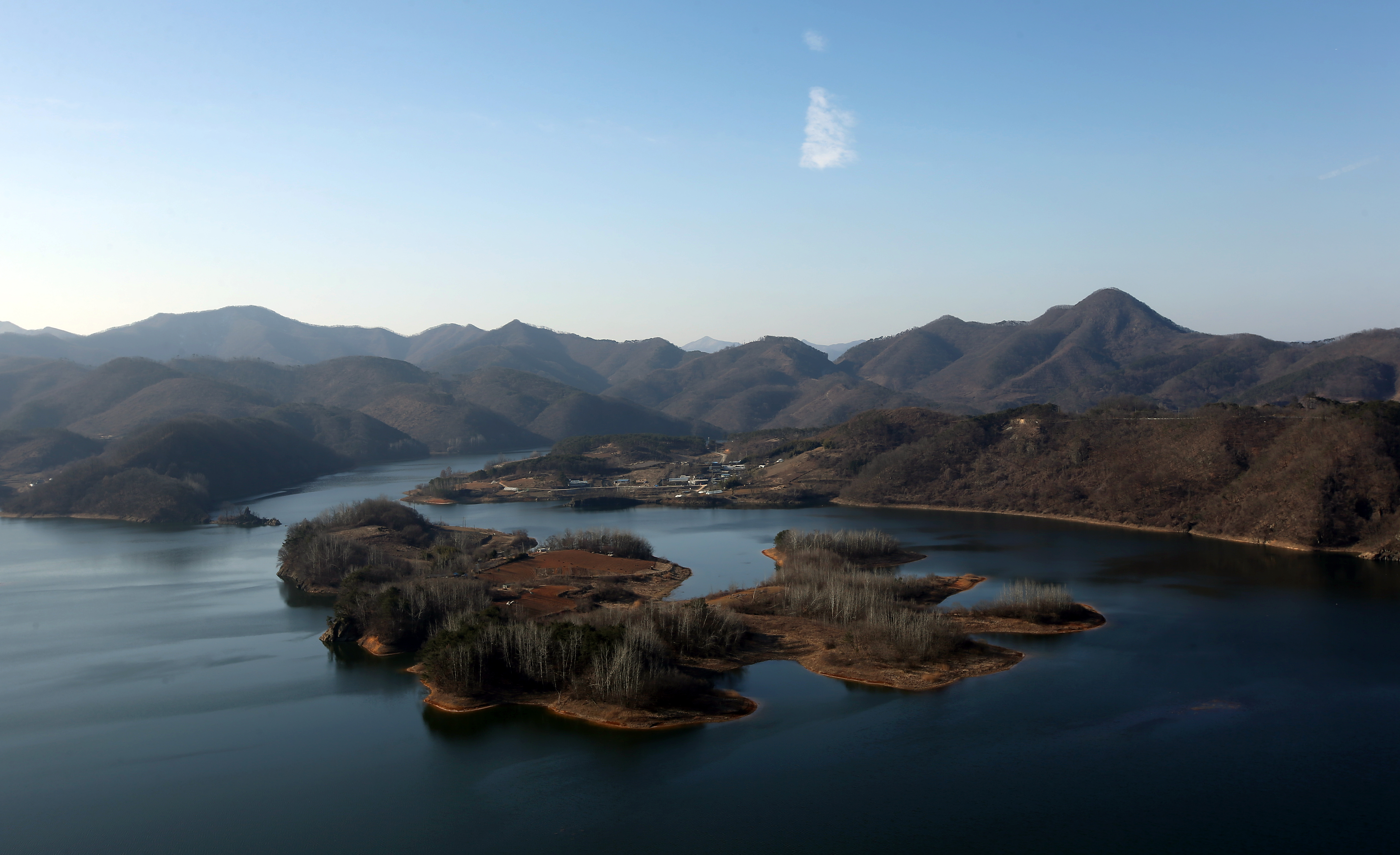
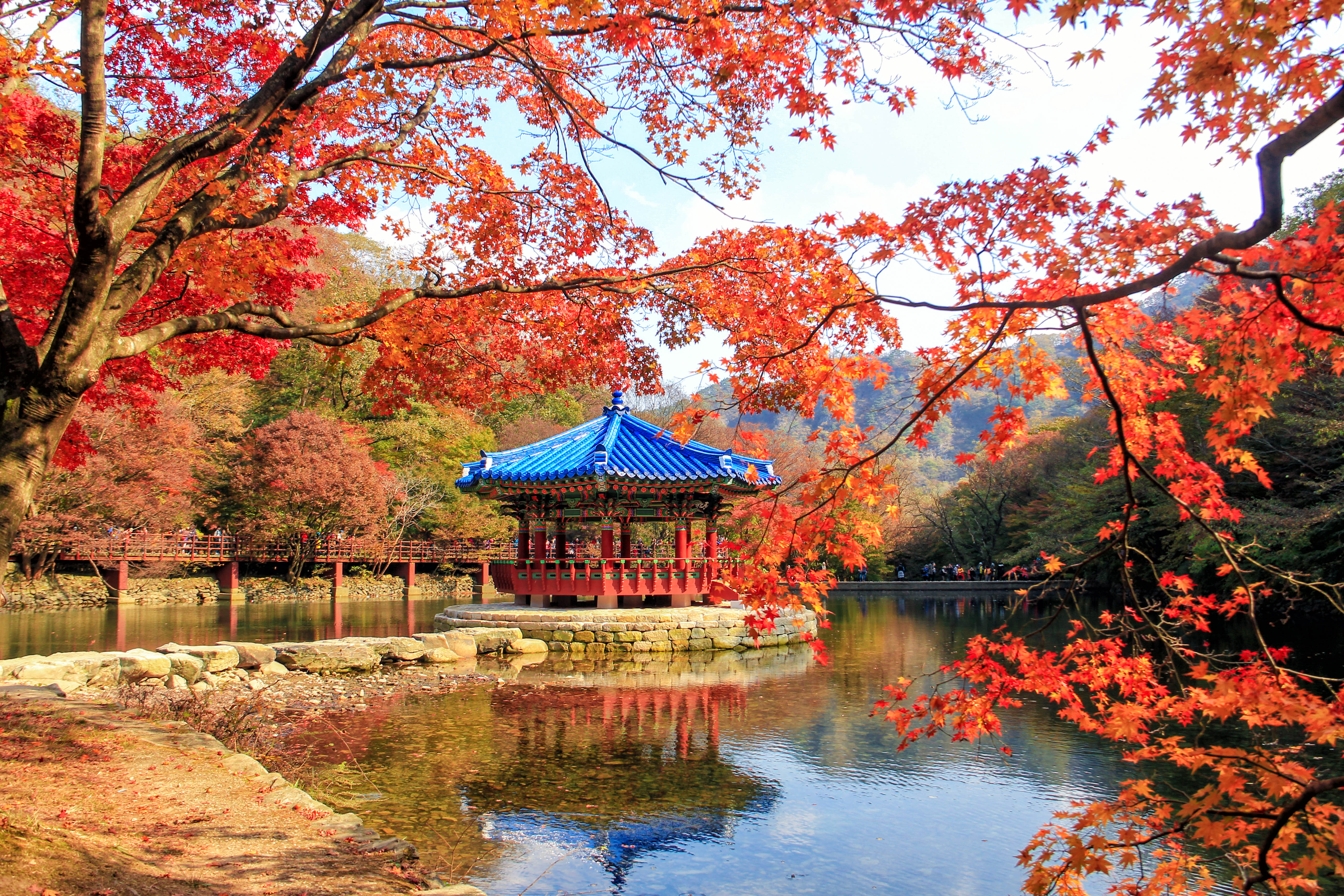
- From the left: Buan County, Buan, Gochang, Iksan, Jeonju, Imsil County, Jeongeup

- Flag Logo

- Country: South Korea
- Region: Honam
- Capital and largest city: Jeonju
- Subdivisions: 6 cities; 8 counties

Government
  - Governor: Lee Won-taeg (Democratic)

Area
  - Total: 8,069.05 km^{2} (3,115.48 sq mi)
  - Rank: 7th

Population (December 2022)
  - Total: 1,769,607
  - Density: 219.31/km^{2} (568.0/sq mi)

GDP (Nominal, 2023)
  - Total: KRW 64 trillion (US$ 51 billion)
  - Per capita: US$ 32,464
- ISO 3166 code: KR-45
- Dialect: Jeolla
- Website: Official website (English)

Korean name
- Hangul: 전북특별자치도
- Hanja: 全北特別自治道
- RR: Jeonbuk-teukbyeoljachido
- MR: Chŏnbuk-t'ŭkpyŏljach'ido

North Jeolla Province, officially Jeonbuk State (Korean: 전북특별자치도; lit. 'Jeonbuk [North Jeolla] Special Self-Governing Province'), is a special self-governing province of South Korea in the Honam region in the southwest of the Korean Peninsula. Jeonbuk borders the provinces of South Chungcheong to the north, North Gyeongsang and South Gyeongsang to the east and Jeonnam-Gwangju to the south.

Jeonbuk State emerged in 1896 from the northern part of the old Jeolla province, one of the Eight Provinces of Korea. Originally North Jeolla Province (Korean: 전라북도; RR: Jeollabuk-do; MR: Chŏllabuk-to), it was renamed Jeonbuk (a shortening of North Jeolla) on January 18, 2024 concurrent with the territory gaining more autonomy and being classified as self-governing rather than as a regular province. The special bill on the creation of the special autonomous province of North Jeolla is a project put forward by the People Power Party in August 2022 in accordance with Article 6 of the special law on the establishment of special autonomous provinces. It is the 3rd province after the provinces of Jeju and Gangwon to obtain this status.

Jeonju is the capital and largest city of Jeonbuk, with other major cities including Iksan, Gunsan and Jeongeup.

Jeolla Province, including North Jeolla, was the first province/state out of the Eight Provinces system to have its 1000th year anniversary in 2018, as the name 'Jeolla-do' was established in 1018, during Hyeonjong of Goryeo's 9th year in power.

== History ==
=== Proto–Three Kingdoms period ===
North Jeolla served as the central region of Mahan among the Samhan, housing 15 of Mahan's total 54 tribal states.

=== Three Kingdoms period ===
During the Three Kingdom Period, this region came to belong to Baekje when it absorbed Mahan.When Baekje established the Jeongbang administrative system (정방제) to govern the local area, the central region (Goseopseong–Gobu area) acted as the core of the province.

After the fall of Baekje by the Silla and Chinese Tang dynasty allied forces in 660 (20th year of King Uija), it came under Tang control. It became a part of Silla when Tang was expelled in 676 (16th year of King Munmu).

When there were nine states and five small capitals in Unified Silla in 685, there were Wansan-ju (present Jeonju) and Namwon-gyeong (present Namwon) in Jeonbuk State in existence.

=== Later Three Kingdoms period ===
In 892, when General Kyŏn Hwŏn founded Hubaekje (later Baekje), this area was the center of the country for about 50 years. In 936, during the Hubaekje rule of Kyŏn Sin-gŏm, it was conquered by Wang Geon and became part of his Goryeo Dynasty. From 900 to the time when Hubaekje was conquered by Goryeo, Wansan-ju (present Jeonju) had been its capital, and the country ruled the whole Jeolla-do region.

=== Goryeo Dynasty ===
In 996 (14th year of King Seongjong), this region was named Gangnam province and the Korean government established the four states (Jeonju-Jeonju province, Yeongju-Gobu, Sunju-Sunchang, and Maju-Okgu) in the North Jeolla region.

Gangnam-do (Jeonbuk) and Haenam-do (South Jeolla Province) were combined and titled as Jeolla-do in 1018 (9th year of King Hyeonjong's reign).

=== Joseon Dynasty ===
During the Joseon period, as the administrative districts of the whole nation were organized in the Eight Provinces system in 1413 (13th year of King Taejong's reign), Jeolla-do took charge of vast areas of one prefecture, four autonomous counties, four protectorates, 12 counties, and 31 counties covering present Jeollanam-do, Jeollabuk-do and Jeju Province.

=== Today ===
In 1963, Geumsan-gun was incorporated into Chungnam, and Wido-myeon of Jeonnam was incorporated into Jeonbuk. Jeongju-eup and Namwon-eup were raised to cities in 1981 and Gimje-eup was raised to city status in 1989. Wansan District and Deokjin District were established in Jeonju-city in the same year.

Due to establishment of cities in the mixed type of city-farming area in 1995, Okgu, Jeungeup, Namwon, Gimje and Iksan-Guns were combined. Gimje and Iksan-guns were merged and Gunsan, Jeonju, Namwon, Gimje and Iri cities were integrated. Through repeated reorganizations of administrative districts, now the region consists of the administrative districts of six cities and eight counties.

Failures in the hosting of the 25th World Scout Jamboree in July 2023 led to political controversy, adding to long-term concerns about a lack of development alongside population decline and aging. As a result of a law passed in December 2023, on January 18, 2024 the North Jeolla became a special self-governing province and was renamed Jeonbuk State (Jeonbuk being an abbreviation of North Jeolla). This new status increases the autonomy of the province's government, being able to approve projects requiring environmental impact assessments and tailor its own immigration and tourism policies.

On September 30, 2024, North Jeolla Province, alongside the Korean Heritage Service (국가유산청), announced that they will be opening a multi-use cultural space institution, "Godo-Hannune Iksan Sagyeyousan center/고도 한눈애(愛) 익산 세계유산센터", or the "Iksan ancient city world heritage center", on October 1, 2024.

== Geography ==
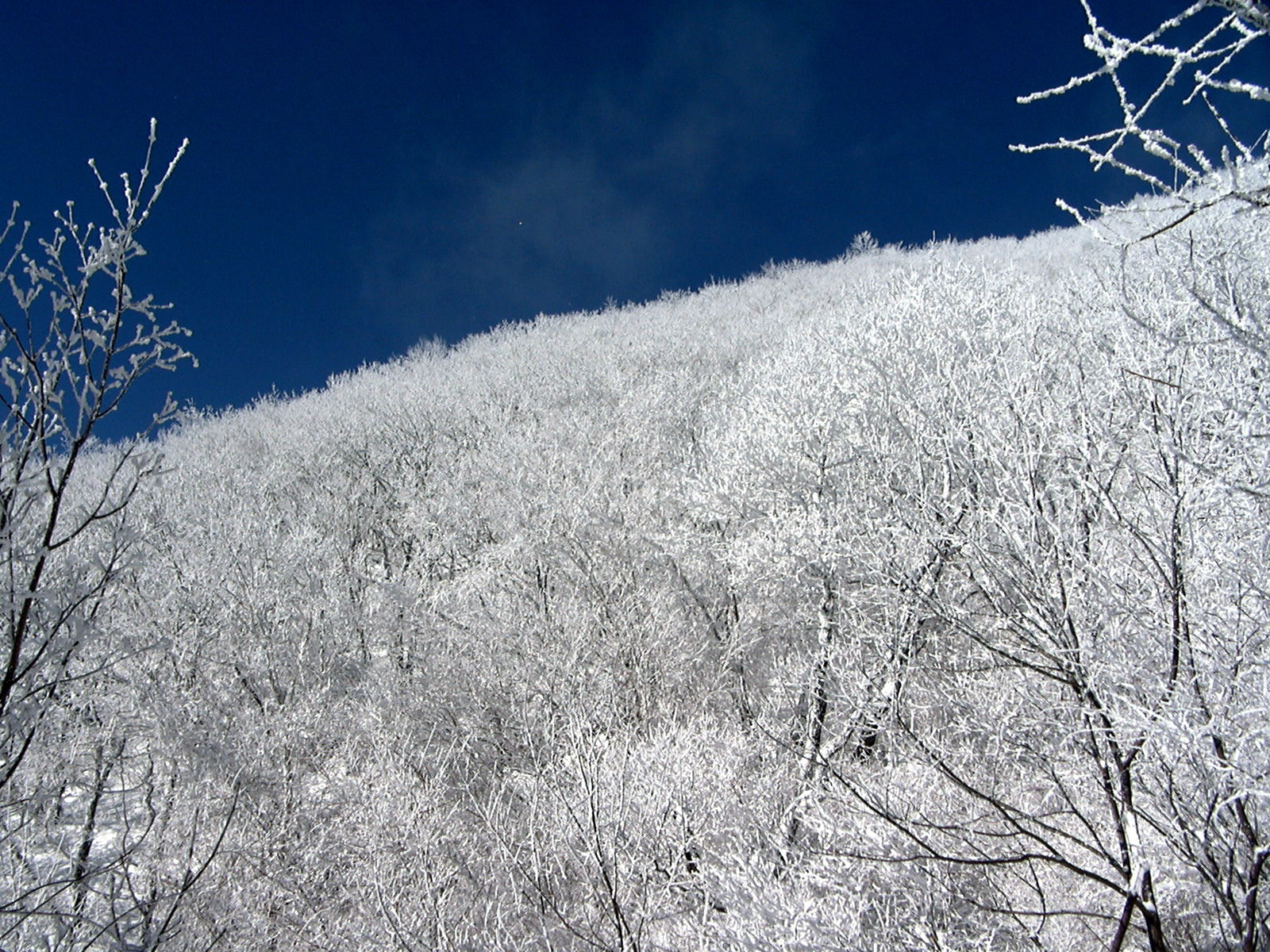
Snow-covered Sobaeksan

Jeonbuk State is in the south-western part of Korea, bordered on the south-eastern by Hadong, Hamyang, and Geochang in South Gyeongsang Province, and Gimcheon in North Gyeongsang Province, Bangyabong Peak of Sobaeksan (1,732 metres (5,682 ft)), Toggibong Peak (1,534 metres (5,033 ft)), Myeongseungbong Peak (1,586 metres (5,203 ft)), Baegunsan (1,279 metres (4,196 ft)), Namdeokyusan Mountain (1,508 metres (4,948 ft)), and Muryongsan Mountain (1,492 metres (4,895 ft)), on the south by Yeonggwang, Jangseong, Damyang, Gokseong, and Gurye, on the north by Geumsan, Nonsan, Buyeo, and Seocheon in South Chungcheong Province, and Yeongdong in North Chungcheong Province and on the west by China over the Yellow Sea.

The total area of Jeonbuk State is 8,067 square kilometres (3,115 mi^{2}), which accounts for 8.1% of the total area of South Korea.

== Demographics ==
Historical population
Year	Pop.	±%
1930	1,467,604	—
1940	1,564,041	+6.6%
1949	2,048,951	+31.0%
1960	2,395,224	+16.9%
1970	2,386,381	−0.4%
1980	2,287,689	−4.1%
1990	2,069,960	−9.5%
2000	1,890,669	−8.7%
2010	1,777,220	−6.0%
2020	1,802,766	+1.4%

== Festivals ==
=== Jeonju International Sori Festival ===
Jeonju International Sori Festival is a high-quality worldwide music art festival based on Pansori, Korea's Intangible Cultural Heritage. It is designed to promote Korean music to the world and exchange diverse musical heritages of many nations though sounds as meditation. The festival was selected as one of the "Best 25 International Festivals" by the UK music magazine Songlines in 2012 and 2013.

=== Jeollabuk-do World Calligraphy Biennale ===
The Jeollabuk-do World Calligraphy Biennale was launched in favor of popularizing and globalizing Korean calligraphy in 1997. Since then, the art of calligraphy, the quintessence of Chinese character culture in East Asia, has gained global interest among calligraphers and the public over the years.

- Festivals of Jeollabuk

== Transportation and industry ==
In the 1960s the Honam highway (which has been upgraded to the Honam Expressway) was built. This created an industrial belt, connecting the cities of Iri (now called Iksan) and Gunsan (a port city) with the provincial capital of Jeonju.

Public transportation networks serve Jeonju and other cities in Jeollabuk-do including Gunsan Airport.

- Jeju International Airport → Gunsan Airport: twice a day / 50-minute flight
- Gunsan Airport → Jeonju: Airport shuttle service / 1 hour running
- Gunsan intercity bus service for other cities and counties

== Education ==
=== National Universities with Graduate Schools ===
- Chonbuk National University - Jeonju
- Kunsan National University - Gunsan
- Jeonju National University of Education - Jeonju

=== Private Universities with Graduate Schools ===
- Howon University – Gunsan
- Jeonju University – Jeonju
- Woosuk University – Wanju County, Jeonju Campus
- Wonkwang University – Iksan
- Won Buddhism Graduate School – Iksan
- Yewon Arts University – Imsil County Campus

=== National Institutes of Higher Education ===
- Korea National College of Agriculture and Fisheries - Jeonju

=== Private Institutes of Higher Education ===
- Jeonju Kijeon College – Jeonju
- Jeonju Technical College - Jeonju
- Kunsan College of Nursing - Gunsan
- Kunjang College – Gunsan
- Paekche Institute of the Arts – Wanju County
- Wonkwang Health Science College – Iksan

== Religion ==
Religion in North Jeolla (2005)
1. Not religious (49.5%)
2. Protestantism (26.3%)
3. Buddhism (12.8%)
4. Catholicism (11.4%)

According to the census of 2005 of the people of Jeonbuk 37.7% follow Christianity (26.3% Protestantism and 11.4% Catholicism) and 12.8% follow Buddhism. 49.5% of the population is mostly not religious or follow Muism and other indigenous religions.

== Economy ==
Based on the provisional figures for 2019, GRDP is KRW 495.9 billion and per capita GRDP is KRW 28.7 million.

The main industry is the service industry, with 68.3% in the service industry, 21.2% in the mining industry, 9.7% in the construction industry, and 0.8% in agriculture and fishing. Rice, barley, peaches, ginseng, peppers, ginger, walnuts, and dried persimmons are mainly produced.

== International sisterhood relationships and partnerships ==
- Sisterhood relationship
  - Jiangsu, People's Republic of China (27 October 1994)
  - Washington, United States (17 May 1996)
  - New Jersey, United States (19 May 2000)
- Partnership
  - Kagoshima Prefecture, Japan (30 October 1989)
  - Ishikawa Prefecture, Japan (10 September 2001)
  - Shanghai, People's Republic of China (17 April 2003)
  - Shandong, People's Republic of China (2 November 2006)

== Administrative divisions ==
Map	#	Name	Hangul	Hanja	Population (2016.12)	Subdivisions
— Specific City —
	1	Jeonju	전주시	全州市	651,744	2 ilban-gu — 33 haengjeong-dong
— City —
	2	Iksan	익산시	益山市	300,479	1 eup, 14 myeon, 14 haengjeong-dong
	3	Gunsan	군산시	群山市	277,551	1 eup, 10 myeon, 16 haengjeong-dong
	4	Jeongeup	정읍시	井邑市	115,173	1 eup, 14 myeon, 8 haengjeong-dong
	5	Gimje	김제시	金堤市	87,782	1 eup, 14 myeon, 4 haengjeong-dong
	6	Namwon	남원시	南原市	84,188	1 eup, 15 myeon, 7 haengjeong-dong
— County —
	7	Wanju County	완주군	完州郡	95,480	3 eup, 10 myeon
	8	Gochang County	고창군	高敞郡	60,597	1 eup, 13 myeon
	9	Buan County	부안군	扶安郡	57,005	1 eup, 12 myeon
	10	Sunchang County	순창군	淳昌郡	29,949	1 eup, 10 myeon
	11	Imsil County	임실군	任實郡	30,197	1 eup, 11 myeon
	12	Muju County	무주군	茂朱郡	24,949	1 eup, 5 myeon
	13	Jinan County	진안군	鎭安郡	26,069	1 eup, 10 myeon
	14	Jangsu County	장수군	長水郡	23,628	1 eup, 6 myeon

== Tourism ==
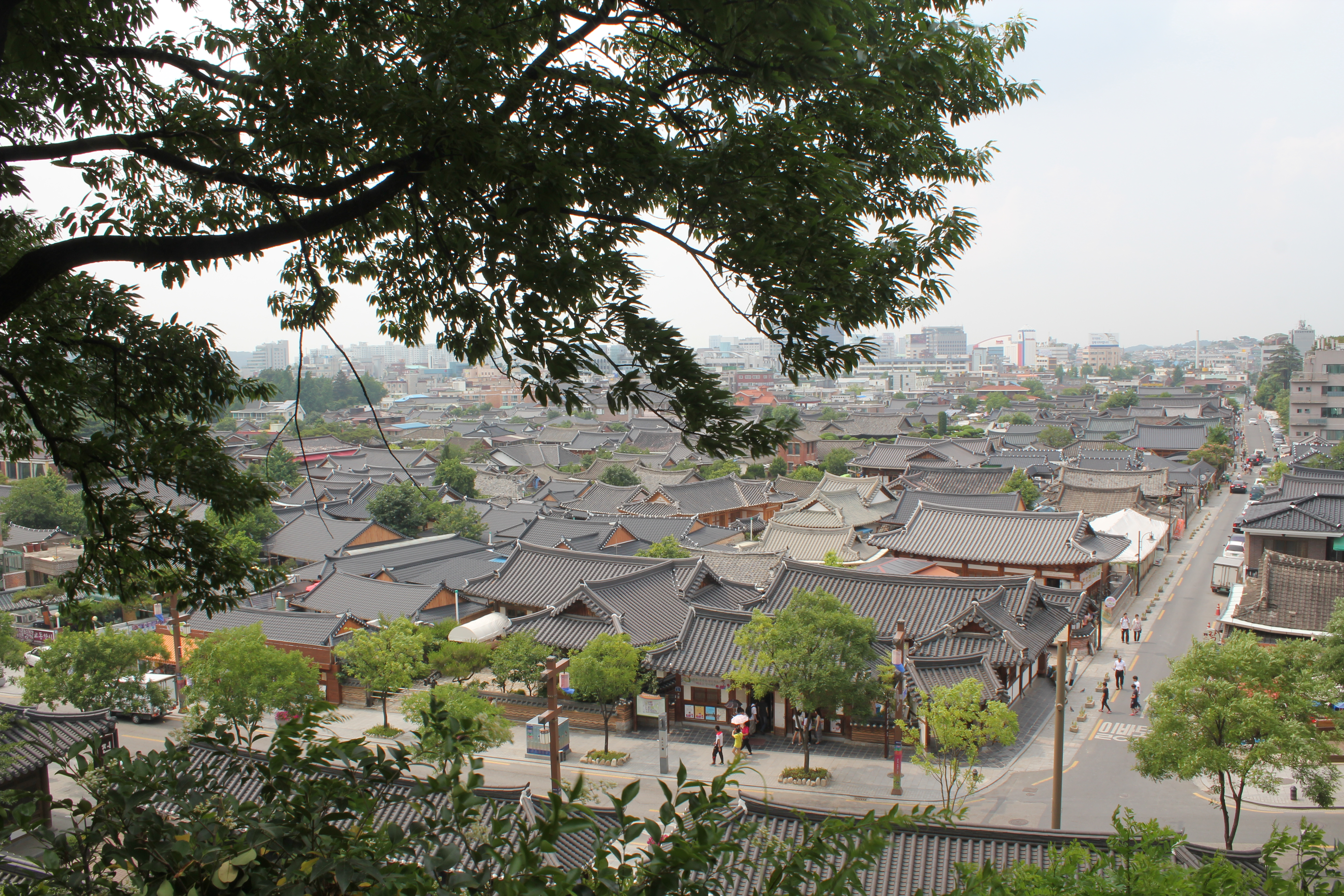
Hanok Village in Jeonju

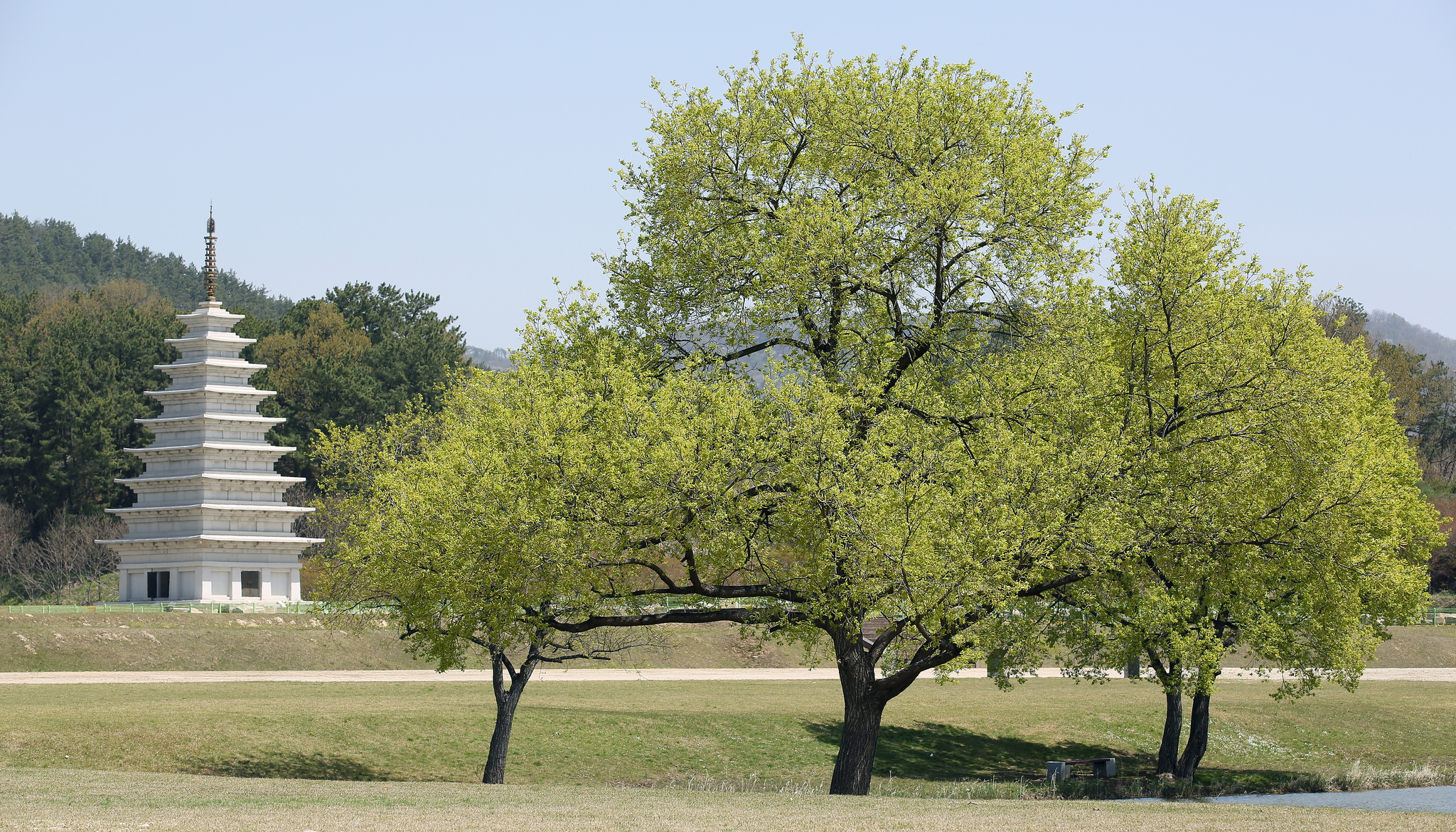
Mireuksa Temple Site in Iksan

- Jeonju — Jeonju Hanok Village, Jeondong Catholic Church, Gyeonggijeon Shrine, Jeonju Hanji Museum, Royal Portrait Museum, Jeonju Gaeksa, Jeonjuhyanggyo Confucian School, Ajung Lake, Deokjin Park,
- Namwon — Gwanghallu Pavilion, Chunhyang Theme Park, Manin Cemetery of Righteous Fighters, Silsangsa Temple, Gyoryong Sanseong Fortress
- Gochang — Gochangeupseong Fortress, Seonunsa Temple, Pansori Museum
- Iksan — Mireuksaji Pagoda, Wanggungri Five-story Stone Pagoda
- Gimje — Geumsansa Temple
- Gunsan — Hirotsu House, Dongguksa Temple, Modern History Museum
- Buan — Tapsa Temple, Byeonsanbando National Park
- Imsil — Imsil Cheese Village

== See also ==
- Jeonbuk Hyundai Motors FC
