= Sunchon National University =

University in South Korea

- 국립순천대학교
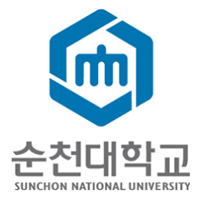
- Motto: Veritas, Creatio (Latin)
- Motto in English: "Truth, Creation"
- Type: National
- Established: 1935; 91 years ago
- President: Byung-Woon Lee
- Faculty: 320 (2024)
- Administrative staff: 568 (2013)
- Students: 12,071 (2013)
- Undergraduates: 11,074
- Postgraduates: 997
- Location: Suncheon, Jeollanam-do, South Korea
- Campus: Urban, 95,999 m^{2} (23.7 acres) 2.545638 km^{2} (617 acres), including the arboreta and other campuses.
- Colors: Blue
- Mascot: Eagle
- Website: www.sunchon.ac.kr

Korean name
- Hangul: 국립순천대학교
- Hanja: 國立順天大學校
- RR: Gungnip Suncheon daehakgyo
- MR: Kungnip Sunch'ŏn taehakkyo

Sunchon National University (SCNU; Korean: 국립순천대학교, colloquially Suncheondae) is a national research university founded in 1935, located in Suncheon, Jeollanam-do, South Korea.

SCNU composes six colleges and five professional schools, and a student body of about 26,000. College of Life Science and Natural Resources, College of Social Sciences, College of Humanities and Arts, College of Engineering, College of Education, and College of Pharmacy.

Also various and differentiated programs such as human resources exchanges with overseas leading universities, global overseas training, overseas culture expedition, etc. The university maintains an undergraduate exchange program with the University of Sheffield, University of Oklahoma, and University of Missouri.

== History ==
Sunchon National University was founded in 1935 as 'Sunchon Public Agriculture School' when U-Seok Kim Jong Ik donated a special land as an academic venue to cultivate talents and inspire national consciousness.

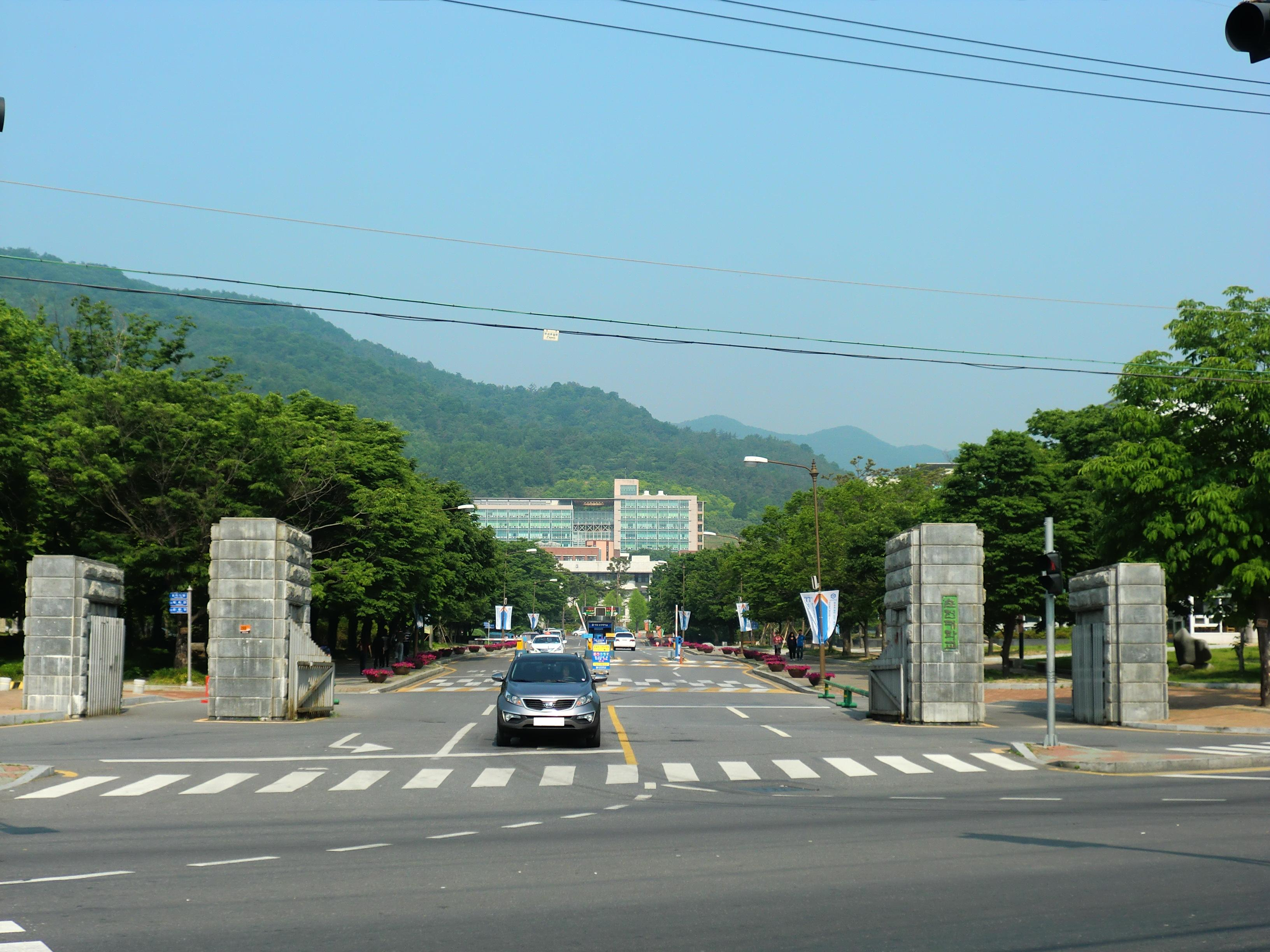
Sunchon National University entrance

It then was renamed to Sunchon Agricultural Middle School (1946), Sunchon Agricultural High School (1951), Sunchon Agricultural Technical High School (1965), Sunchon Agricultural Polytechnic (1973) followed by an elevation to Sunchon Agricultural College in 1979 registering as a tertiary education institute. In 1982, it fully fledged into a four-year university, starting anew with ten departments. In 1987, it established graduate schools and evolved into a full four-year university with five colleges in 1991. Graduate School of Education (1993), Graduate School of Industries (1994), Graduate School of Business & Public Administration (1995) and Graduate School of Information & Science (1996) opened up in series and doctor's course was newly added in 1994.

The same year, Sunchon National University received 10 billion Won in contribution from POSCO for local talent cultivation with which Lifelong Education Center under Sunchon National University Academic Scholarship Foundation was established to provide re-training to local residents and contribute to local economic growth alongside Language Institute and Farming Education Center.

In 2001, Sunchon National University opened state-of-the-art Central Library, Center for Information & Electronic Calculation and built e-library to serve as sources for knowledge and information. Drive for university reform and internal innovations led to Sunchon National University being designated as a specialized university in agriculture and awarded as party to government-run projects including BK 21. In 2005, Sunchon National University was ranked 17th out of 183 universities nationwide from the Ministry of Education, Science & Technology in the category of financial support and 10th among 44 national universities in school innovation.

In 2002, it was selected as a top-tier university in education and research attainments in assessment of national university's own development plans, winning recognition as the education institute on the growth track.

In 2023, Sunchon National University changed its native name from '순천대학교' to '국립순천대학교'.

== Facilities ==
=== Library ===
Sunchon National University Library is located in the middle of the campus. The library was established in 1979, and has collected and offered various data which are needed for investigations and studies. In 1992, the library was opened fully for more effective data utilization, and in 1996, database was constructed by academic informative system based on web. In December 2001, it was enlarged for increasing data, effective management of information and active services. Now, we are trying to construct electronic library and information supplying system, through hightech communication techniques (E-mail contents service (SDI), copy service of original texts, VOD service). To cope with demands of professional information and millennium era, various service systems are being constructed for supporting all sorts of academic investigations.

=== Museum ===
The museum collects, preserves and exhibits valuable materials of various areas including antiquities, humanities, history, ethnic customs, arts, natural science and folk culture. These collections can help faculty and students by offering investigation materials.

=== Language Institute ===
The institute calls in the best instructors for high-quality linguistic service, and operates various programs for linguistic studies. Instructors come from the United States, Canada, Australia, New Zealand, and China. Foreign faculty are housed either in an on-campus dormitory or off-campus in apartments. Contracts typically run for one year at a time and faculty are given the opportunity to teach not only university students but working adults as well.

=== Human Resources Development Center ===
The center has been operating various job-seeking programs such as job-seeking counseling, psychological counseling, and academic affairs.

=== International Affair ===
The Language Institute was established in Apr.2008.

=== Academic-Indestrial Cooperation Organization ===
This is an agency founded for innovating regional industries by spreading technologies of SNU to industrial foundations. To lead this innovation, commercial ties would be strengthened and various associated programs are managed to support family companies. It also participates actively on various national enterprises managed by the government to complete practical foundation of industry-academic cooperation. It will furthermore supports not only enterprises but also regional innovation.

=== Dormitories ===
Sunchon National University boasts one of the finest dormitories in South Korea. The dormitories consist of 5 buildings(Cheongwoongwan, Hyangrimgwan 2, Changjogwan for male and Hyangrimgwan 1&3, Jinligwan for female) and 1 administrative building. Female dormitory is in the form of the latest apartment, and each room has LAN facility. Each dormitory buildings have computer room, resting room, laundry, and various convenient facilities, and also provide high speed internet access, communication systems, and support facilities.

== International rankings ==
URAP World University Rankings (2013) considered it 1351st in the worldQS World University Rankings (2013/14) considered it 201st in Asia uniRank World University Rankings (2013) considered it 36th in Korea

== Notable alumni ==
=== Arts and literature ===
- Kim Sung-hwan, cartoonist
- Park Yong-je, cartoonist
- Kim Jae-hyeon, cartoonist
- Jung Han-na, cartoonist
- Son Gyu-ho, cartoonist
- Oh min-hong, cartoonist
- Youn Soe, cartoonist
- Park Yoon-young, writer and artist
- Choi Bo-ram, writer

=== Politics ===
- Kim Gwang-jin, 19th member of the National Assembly in South Korea (2012~2016)

=== Business ===
- Jang Yung-sik, founder and CEO of Yungsan

=== Sports ===
- Han Sang-yong, E-sports coach

=== Academia ===
- Lee, In-hyuk, Professor at University of Georgia

== See also ==
- List of national universities in South Korea
- List of universities and colleges in South Korea
- Education in Korea
