= Kunsan National University =

University in South Korea

- Type: National
- Established: 1947
- Academic staff: 415
- Administrative staff: 199
- Undergraduates: 7,313
- Location: Gunsan, South Korea
- Campus: 2 campuses(Miryong campus, Saemangeum campus)
- Website: https://www.kunsan.ac.kr/

- Kunsan National University
- Hangul: 군산대학교
- Hanja: 群山大學校
- RR: Gunsan daehakgyo
- MR: Kunsan taehakkyo

Kunsan National University is a national university located in Miryong-dong, Gunsan, Jeollabuk-do, in western South Korea. The university first opened its doors in 1947 as Kunsan Teachers' College. It gained university status in 1991.

== Notable people ==
- Jin Hee-kyung, actress
- Song Sae-byeok, actor

== See also ==
- List of national universities in South Korea
- List of universities and colleges in South Korea
- Education in Korea
