= Kongju National University =

University in Gongju, South Korea

- 국립공주대학교
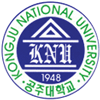
- Motto: Truth inquiry, Value creation, Justice practice
- Type: National
- Established: 1948
- President: Lim Kyung-ho (임경호)
- Faculty: 529
- Undergraduates: 18,796
- Postgraduates: 2,756
- Location: Gongju, Chungnam Province, 32588, Republic of Korea (South Korea); 36.469°N 127.140°E
- Campus: 3 campuses (Gongju, Cheonan, Yesan)
- Website: http://english.kongju.ac.kr/ (English) http://www.kongju.ac.kr/ (Korean)

- Kongju National University
- Hangul: 국립공주대학교
- Hanja: 國立公州大學校
- RR: Gungnip Gongju daehakgyo
- MR: Kungnip Kongju taehakkyo

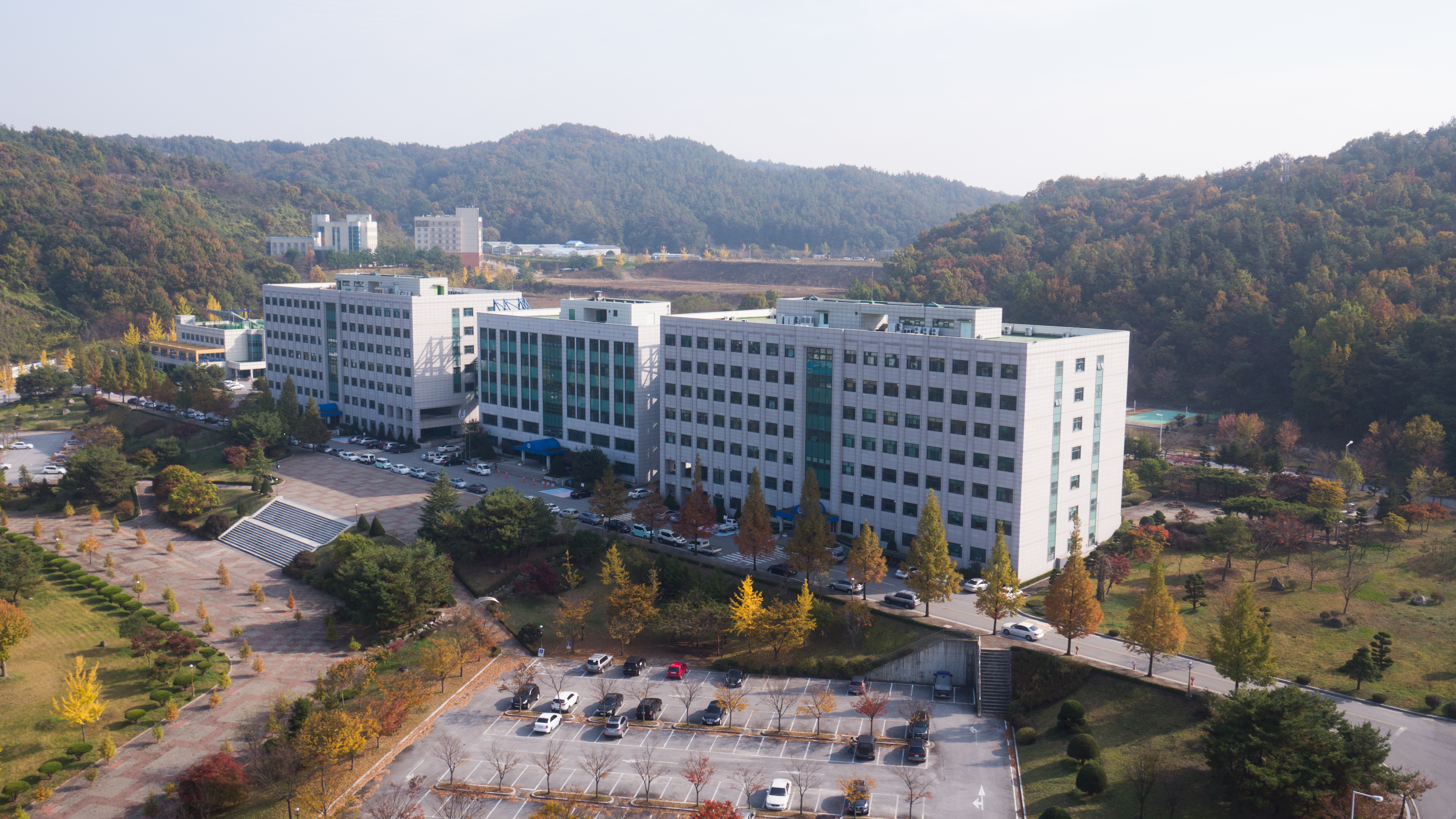
View of the Yesan campus.

Kongju National University (KNU) is a university in Chungcheongnam-do, South Korea with three campuses in Gongju, Cheonan and Yesan.

== History ==
In 1948, Kongju College of Education was established to meet the needs of a growing nation, creating for itself a tradition and history. Kongju National University (KNU) began to develop the distinctive TRI-CAMPUS facilities in the Gongju, Yesan, and Cheonan areas, which include seven separate colleges for undergraduate and graduate students, and special graduate school opportunities. KNU is the only national university near the new public administration complex city, Sejong. Therefore, KNU has unlimited visions for growth as the core university of the new public administration city in the 21st century Korea. KNU has 22,000 students, which includes international students from 39 different countries.

== Campuses ==
- Gongju Campus (Main Campus)

56 Gongjudaehak-ro, Gongju-si, Chungcheongnam-do, Republic of Korea

- Cheonan Campus (College of Engineering)

1223–254 Cheonan-daero, Seobuk-gu, Cheonan-si, Chungcheongnam-do, Republic of Korea

- Yesan Campus (College of Industrial Sciences)

54 Daehak-ro, Yesan-gun, Yesan-eup, Chungcheongnam-do, Republic of Korea

== Colleges and departments ==
=== College of education ===
The College of Education has inherited 60 years long of tradition from the Kongju National Teachers College, established in 1948. From starting off with 3 departments (Korean Literature, Mathematics, and Housekeeping) and 136 students, Kongju National University College of Education now have 22 departments with 122 professors and about 3,000 students. It is the largest among all National Teachers Colleges in South Korea.

Korean Education/ Sino-Korean Classics Education/ English Education/ Ethics Education/ Education/ Business Information Education/ Library and Information Science Education/ Special Education/ History Education/ Social Studies Education/ Geography Education/ Early Childhood Education/ Mathematics Education/ Physics Education/ Chemistry Education/ Biology Education/ Earth Science Education/ Environmental Education/ Computer Education/ Technology and Home Economics Education/ Physical Education/ Music Education/ Art Education

=== College of Humanities and Social Sciences ===
The College of Humanities and Social Sciences was established in 1991, when Kongju National University was accredited as a comprehensive university from the Kongju National Teachers College. It offers its courses in two divisions (majors), and department divisions (departments) and has three departments.

English Language and Literature/ Chinese Language and Literature/ French Language and Literature/ German Language and Literature/ History/ Geography/ Economics/ International Trade and Commerce/ Business Administration/ Tourism Administration/ Tourism English Interpretation/ Public Administration/ Law/ Social Welfare

=== College of Natural Sciences ===
Physics/ Applied Mathematics/ Chemistry/ Life Sciences/ Geo-Environmental Sciences/ Geography/ Atmospheric Sciences/ Cultural Heritage Conservation Sciences/ Fashion Design and Merchandising/ Life Sports Educators

=== College of Engineering ===
The College of Engineering of Kongju National University aims to produce capable engineering experts who will lead the industrial society of the future and who are ready to respond to the info-tech driven world. The College of Engineering was integrated with Cheonan National Technical College in March 2005, and its campus was relocated to Cheonan, opening a new chapter in the history of the college. The college operates 10 departments, 26 majors and two courses. The number of students exceeds 5,000, including graduate students, and more than 180 faculty members are dedicated to education and research in this large-scale college.

Electrical Engineering/ Control and Measurement Engineering/ Electronics Engineering-Nano and Information Engineering/ Radio Science Engineering/ Information and Communication Engineering/ Computer Engineering/ Multimedia Engineering/ Mechanical Engineering/ Mechanical Design Engineering/ Automotive Engineering/ Mechanical Engineering and System Design/ Civil and Environmental Engineering/ Urban and Transportation Engineering/ Architecture Design/ Architectural Engineering/ Chemical Engineering/ Industrial Chemistry/ Nano-Material Science and Engineering/ Polymer Science and Engineering/ Advanced Material Science and System Engineering/ Product Design/ Visual Information Design/ Environmental Engineering/ Industrial and Systems Engineering/ Optical Information Engineering/ Metallic Molding Design Engineering

=== College of Industrial Sciences ===
The College of Industrial Sciences is located in Yesan, in the central part of western Chungnam Province. There are various departments with an emphasis on agriculture, life sciences, and industrial sciences. The college has mutual research exchange programs with 22 colleges in 8 different countries.

Community Development/ Real Estate/ Industrial Channels Management/ Plant Resources/ Horticultural Science/ Animal Resources Science/ Rural Construction Engineering/ Bio-Industry Mechanical Engineering/ Forest Resources/ Landscape Architecture/ Food and Nutrition/ Food Service Management and Nutrition/ Food Science and Technology/ Companion and Laboratory Animal Science

=== College of Nursing and Health ===
Nursing/ Health Administration/ Emergency Medical Service/ Medical Information

=== College of Arts ===
Game Design/ Furniture Design/ Ceramic Design/ Jewelry Design/ Cartoon Comics/ Animation/ Dancing/ Media Image Art and Technology

=== Division of International Studies ===
DIS, established in 2011, admitted its first cohort of students in 2012. The Division draws on the strengths of economics, business, mathematics, statistics, and English while also being firmly rooted in globalization of the scholarly academy.

=== Division of Liberal Arts ===
Established in 2021

== Campus life ==
=== Dormitory ===
The dormitories are in five buildings, and accommodate 4,365 students, including 2,773 students at Gongju Campus, 582 students at Yesan Campus and 234 students at Cheonan Campus. Foreign students are given priority for dormitory rooms upon acceptance.

Gongju Campus

Yesan Campus

Cheonan Campus

=== Campus clubs ===
Students join clubs to socialize and to meet other students who also enjoy the same hobbies.

== Notable people ==
- Yoon Mun-sik (actor)
- Baek Seung Tak (Chungcheongnam-do Province Superintendent of Education) the father of Baek Jong-won

== See also ==
- List of national universities in South Korea
- List of universities and colleges in South Korea
- Education in Korea

== Gallery ==
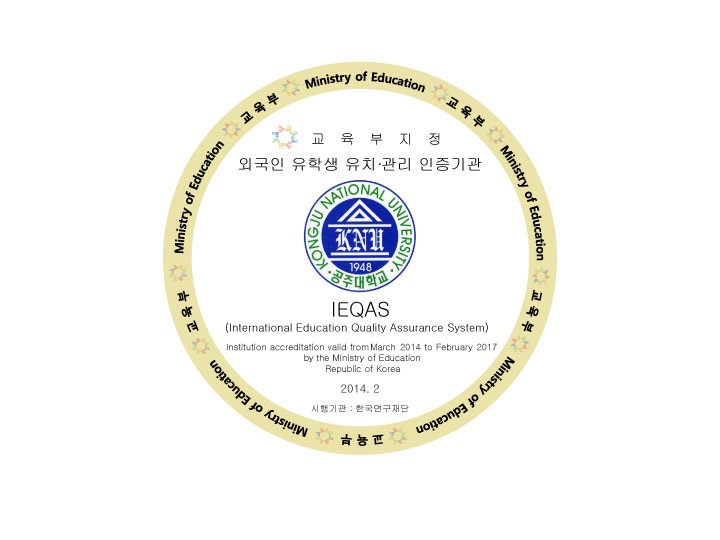
an IEQAS certified university

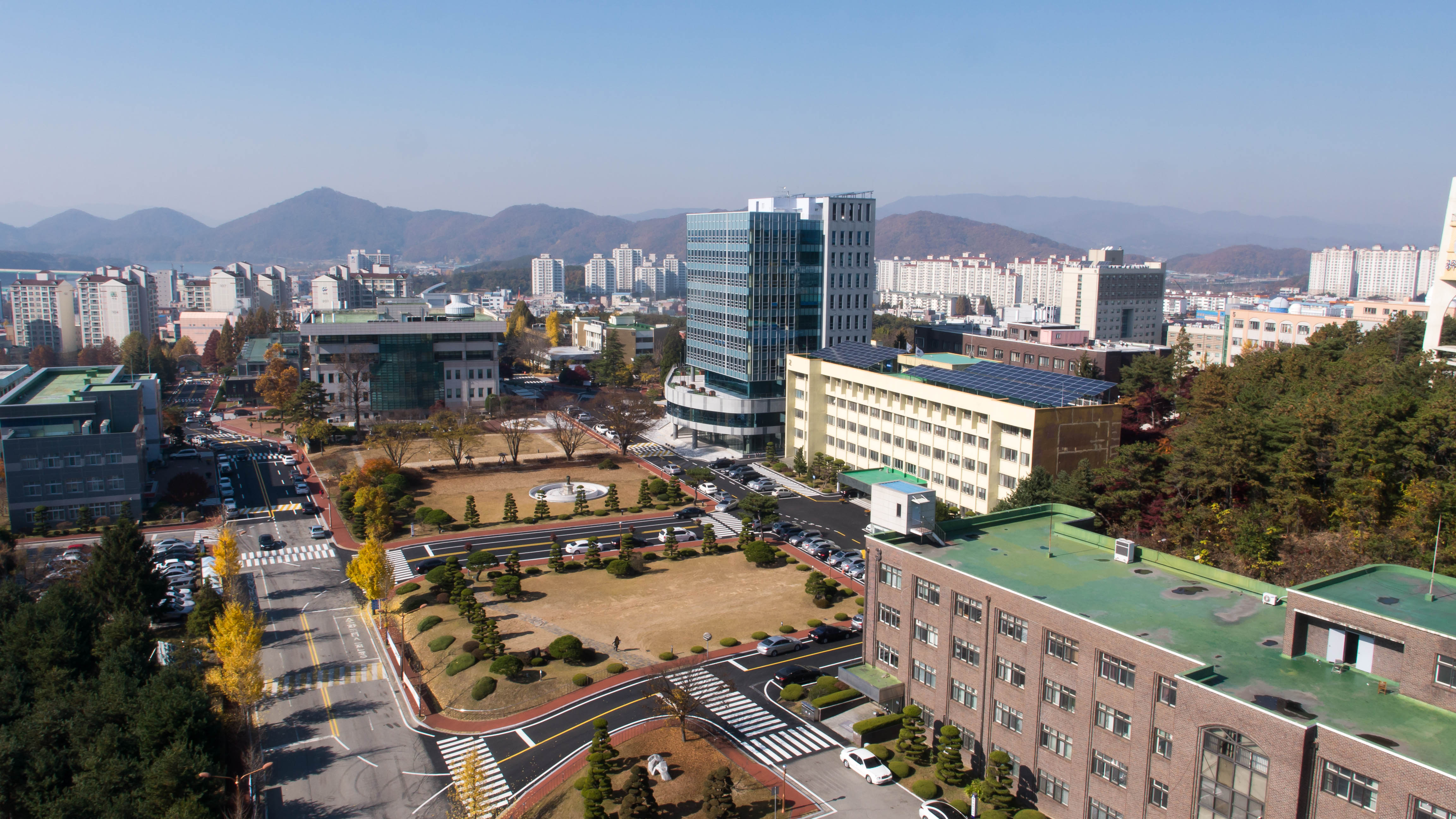
aerial shot of Gongju campus

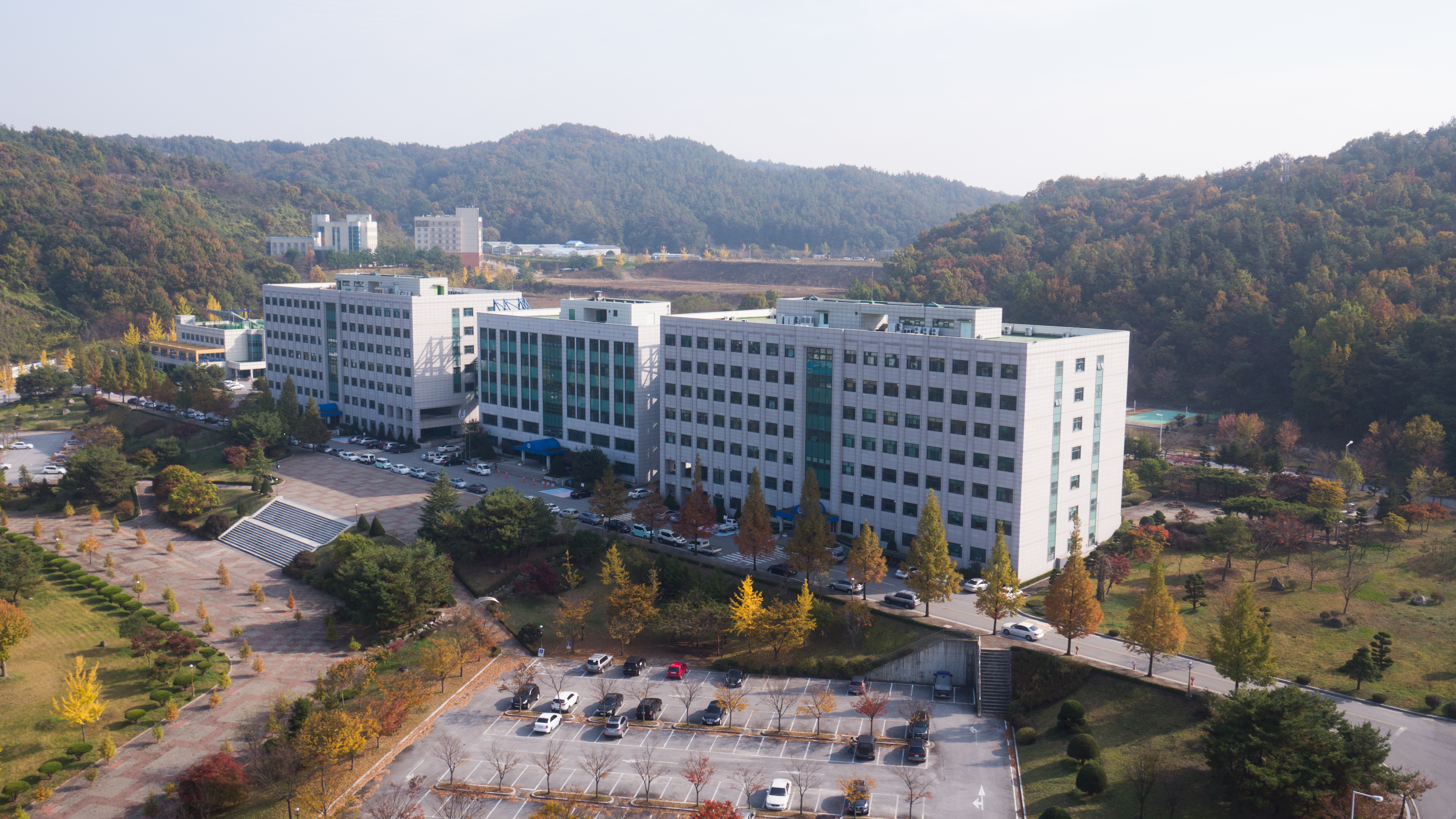
aerial shot of Yesan campus

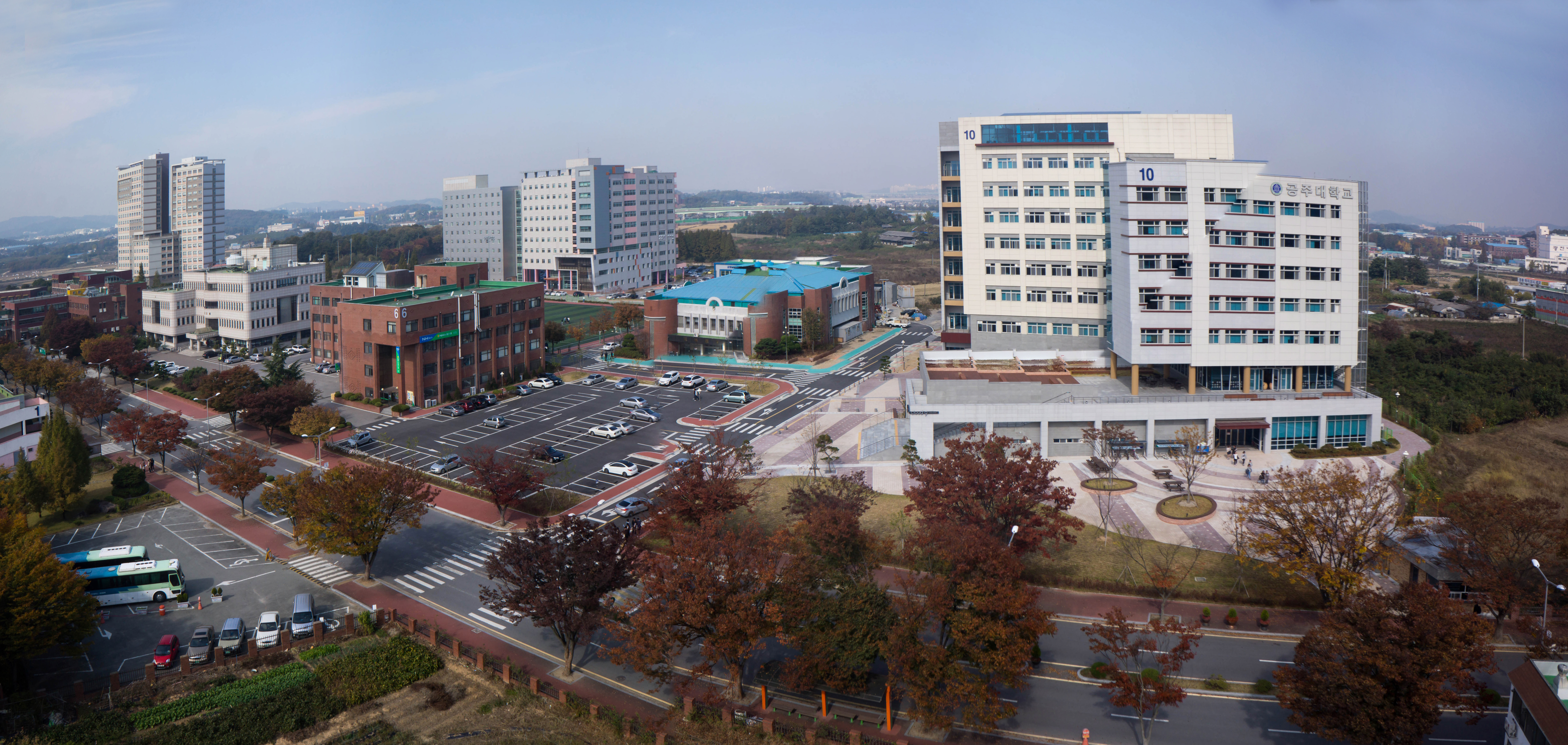
aerial shot of Cheonan campus

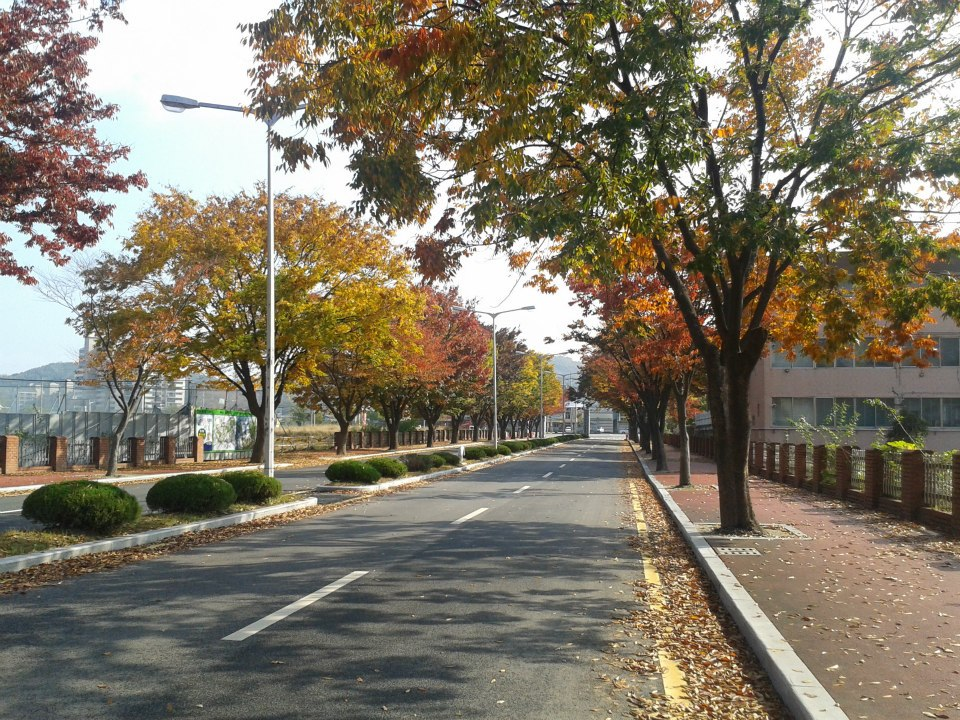
Front gate of Cheonan campus

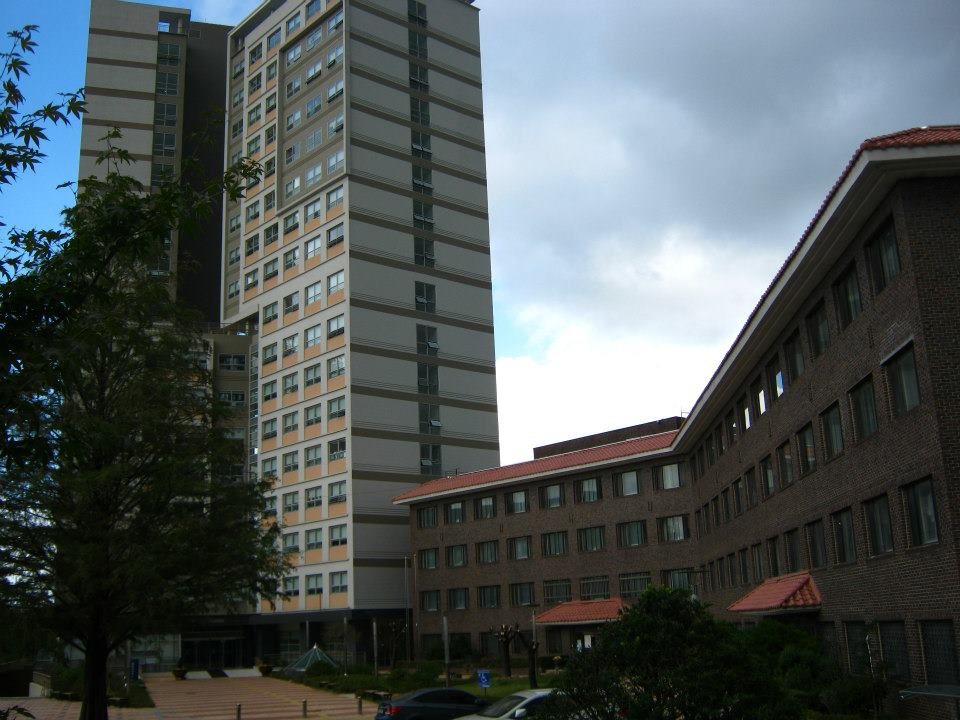
Dormitory of Cheonan campus

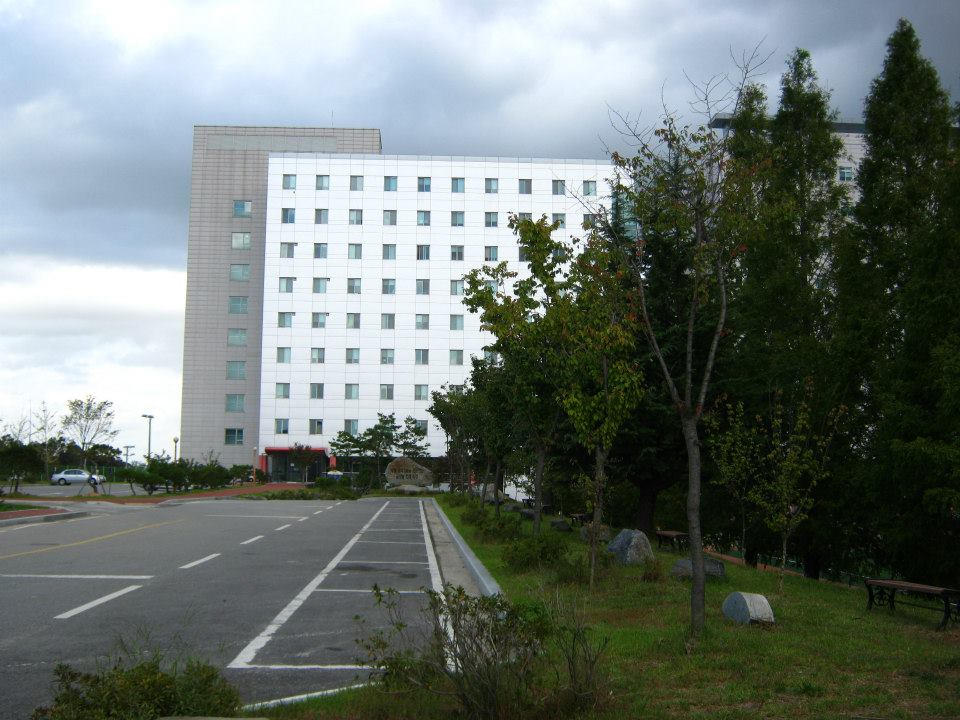
Electrical Engineering Building of Cheonan campus

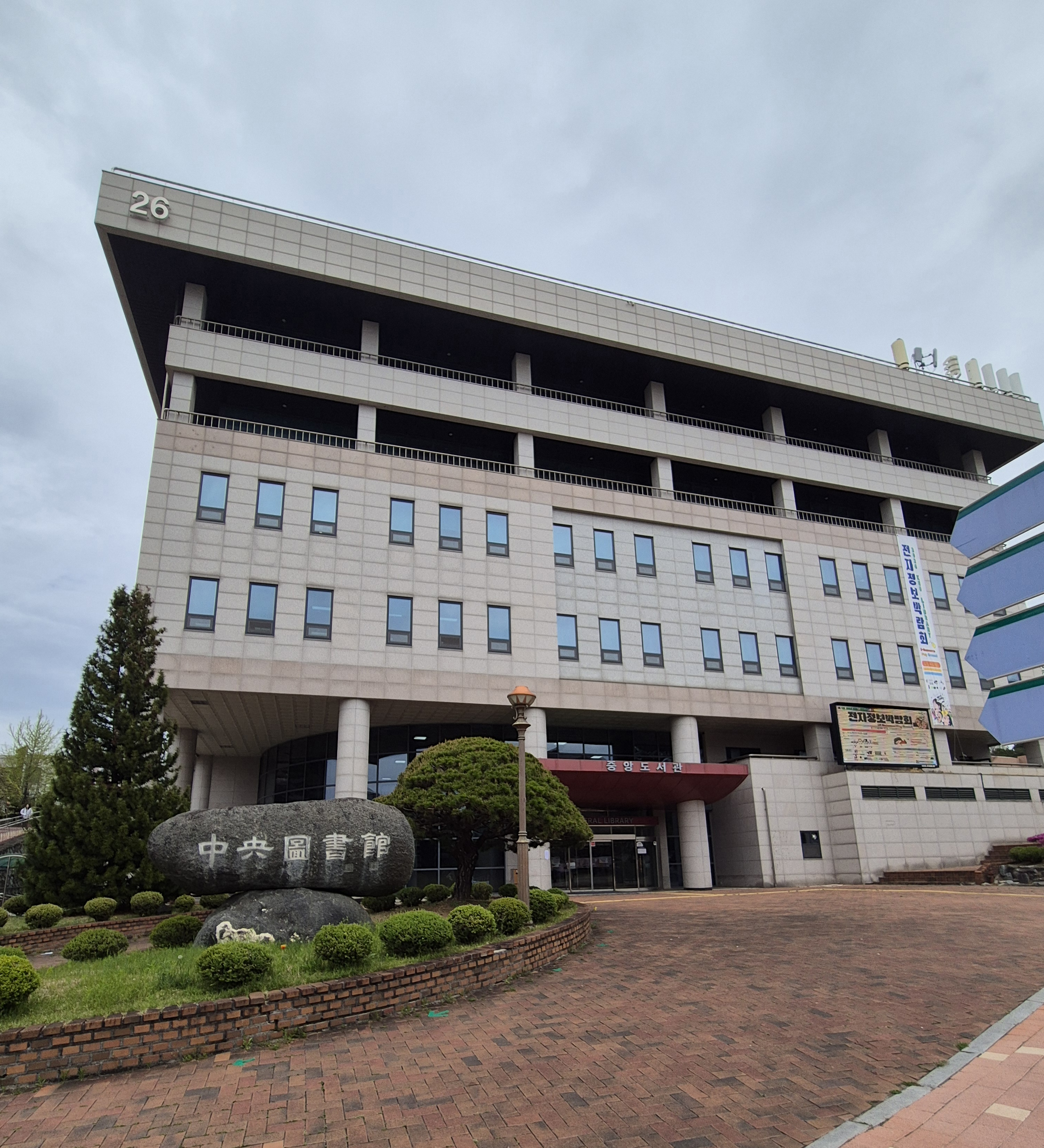
Main library at Gongju campus
