= Korea National University of Education =

South Korean national university

- 한국교원대학교
- Motto: Love, Confidence, and Patience
- Type: National
- Established: 1984 (42 years ago)
- Affiliations: ICUE
- President: Kim, Jongwoo
- Faculty: 205
- Administrative staff: 247
- Students: 5,630
- Undergraduates: 2,393
- Postgraduates: 3,237
- Doctoral students: 431
- Location: Cheongju, South Korea; 36.60835°N 127.3582°E
- Campus: Suburban 191 acres (77 ha)
- Colors: Skyblue
- Nickname: Kyowondae
- Mascot: Oriental stork
- Website: www.knue.ac.kr
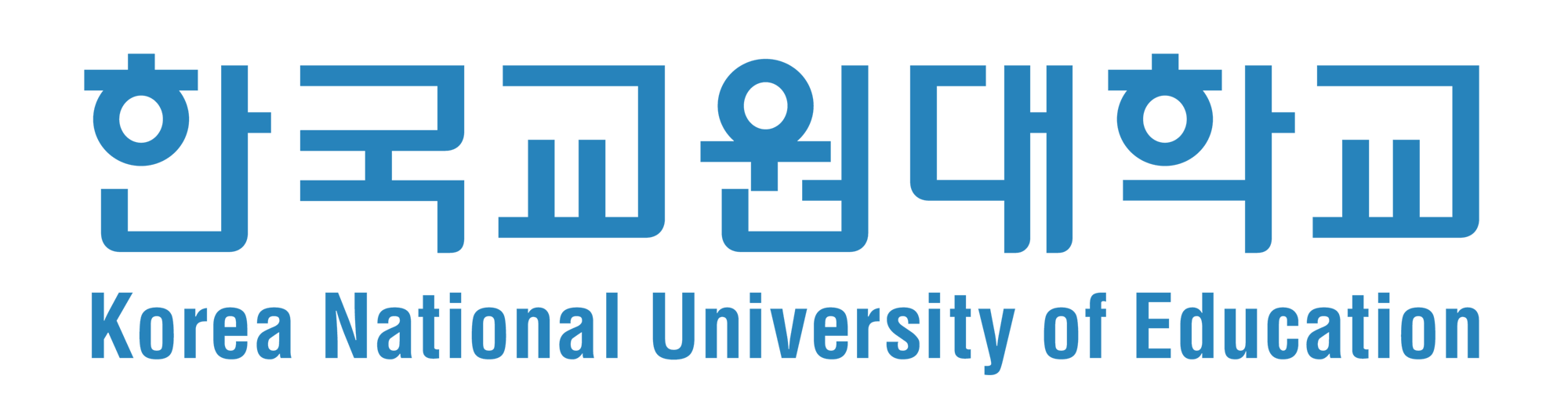

- Korea National University of Education
- Hangul: 한국교원대학교
- Hanja: 韓國教員大學校
- RR: Hanguk gyowon daehakgyo
- MR: Han'guk kyowŏn taehakkyo

Main campus in Cheongju, South Korea.

Korea National University of Education (KNUE; Korean: 한국교원대학교, colloquially Kyowondae) is a South Korean national university which specializes in pre- and in-service teacher training and educational research. It comprises four colleges and three graduate schools. The student body consists of about 2,400 undergraduate and 3,300 graduate students. The university is widely regarded as the top South Korean university in the field of education.

== Characteristics ==
It was founded in 1984 based on the Article 43 of the Higher Education Act and the Presidential Decree on the Establishment of Korea National University of Education. As the most prestigious national institution for teacher training and educational research, it is the only university in South Korea that collectively prepares kindergarten, primary school, and secondary school teachers. It also provides continuous teacher education and conducts comprehensive educational research.

=== Pre-service education ===
The university conducts pre-teacher training in its undergraduate course. It offers dual majors regardless of kindergarten, primary, or secondary education. Graduates receive a teaching certificate and a bachelor of education degree. Since its establishment, it has produced 16,000 graduates as of 2017, and most of them have been working as teachers in national, public and private schools, academic scholars, bureaucrats, and educational researchers.

=== In-service education ===
The university runs the Center for In-service Education which provides reeducation and professional training for current teachers. It is responsible for the national qualification training of kindergarten, elementary, middle and high school principals, and master teachers.

=== Educational research ===
It explores educational theories and problems in school education and develops new educational theories, materials and policies. The university also makes a feedback of research results from school educators.

== Academics ==
=== Admissions ===
Admissions to the university is highly selective because the students are regarded as pre-service teachers. All applicants are required to get a letter of recommendation from each local educational superintendent and pass the entry interviews. Students are admitted by major instead of into a general freshman pool.

=== Scholarships ===
The university offers scholarships to all undergraduate students. They are exempted from admission fee and all tuition fees by presidential decree and can stay in the university dormitory for free for two years. These are fully covered through government funding.

=== KOICA-KNUE Master's Degree Program in Global Education Leadership ===
Since 2018 the university has been hosting KOICA's global fellowship program CIAT (Capacity Improvement & Advancement for Tomorrow) students through specially designed academic program. The program is highly competitive, with around 15 people being chosen each year based on the adequacy of academic background, academic aptitude, character (dedication and passion), and several other criteria set by KOICA.

=== Academic structure ===
Four colleges of the university offer 24 undergraduate degree programs. For master and doctoral programs there are three graduate schools with 50 programs from four fields of studies.

== See also ==
- List of national universities in South Korea
- List of universities and colleges in South Korea
- Education in Korea
