= Korea National University of Cultural Heritage =

University in Buyeo, South Korea

Coordinates: 36.308°N 126.897°E

- Hangul: 한국전통문화대학교
- Hanja: 韓國傳統文化大學校
- RR: Hanguk jeontongmunhwa daehakgyo
- MR: Han'guk chŏnt'ongmunhwa taehakkyo

Korea National University of Heritage (Korean: 한국전통문화대학교) is a national university located in Buyeo County, South Korea. Construction began in 1996, and the official opening ceremony was held on 2 March 2000.

== See also ==
- List of national universities in South Korea
- List of universities and colleges in South Korea
- Education in Korea
