= Cristaria =

Cristaria is the scientific name of two genera of organisms and may refer to:

- Cristaria (bivalve), a genus of mussels in the family Unionidae
- Cristaria (plant), a genus of plants in the family Malvaceae
