= Baekje Military Museum =

Coordinates: 36.1924°N 127.1812°E

Baekje Military Museum is a public museum in Nonsan, South Korea elucidating the military history of the later Baekje kingdom. The museum includes artifacts, reconstructed weapons and armor, dioramas, and a reconstructed defense wall. It opened in 2002. Opening hours are between 09:00 to 18:00 except on Mondays and the Chuseok and Lunar New Year holidays. The museum is administered by Nonsan's city government. It is located just north of Tapjeong Reservoir, off highway 4 / 1.
