= List of Treasures of South Korea (1980–1984) =

The Treasures of South Korea designation was established in 1962 and is managed by the Korea Heritage Service (KHS; formerly "Cultural Heritage Administration"). This designation is distinct from the National Treasure designation. Covered here are items designated in the years 1980 through 1984.

== List ==
No. (Note: On November 19, 2021, the Cultural Heritage Administration removed the numbering system for all of its designations, including Treasure. Previously assigned numbers are preserved here for the sake of reference.)	Image	Official names (Note: (English, Hangul, Hanja/mixed script))	Location	Dates	Refs
661		Stone Relief of Apsaras, Sangju 상주 석조천인상 尙州 石造天人像	Sangju, North Gyeongsang	1980-06-11, 2010-08-25 renamed	
662		Uhwaru Pavilion of Hwaamsa Temple, Wanju 완주 화암사 우화루 完州 花巖寺 雨花樓	Wanju County, North Jeolla	1980-06-11	
~~663~~		~~완주 화암사 극락전~~; ~~完州 花巖寺 極樂殿~~	~~Wanju County, North Jeolla~~	1980-06-11, 2011-11-28 removed, made National Treasure No. 316	
664		Daeungjeon Hall of Ansimsa Temple, Cheongwon 청주 안심사 대웅전 淸州 安心寺 大雄殿	Cheongju, North Chungcheong	1980-06-11, 2015-09-25 renamed	
665		Rock-carved Seated Bodhisattva Triad in Nangsan Mountain, Gyeongju 경주 낭산 마애보살삼존좌상 慶州 狼山 磨崖菩薩三尊坐像	Gyeongju, North Gyeongsang	1980-06-11, 2010-08-25 renamed	
666		Stone Seated Buddha in Samneunggye Valley of Namsan Mountain, Gyeongju 경주 남산 삼릉계 석조여래좌상 慶州 南山 三陵溪 石造如來坐像	Gyeongju, North Gyeongsang	1980-06-11, 2010-08-25 renamed	
667		Iron Seated Vairocana Buddha of Hancheonsa Temple, Yecheon 예천 한천사 철조비로자나불좌상 醴泉 寒天寺 鐵造毘盧遮那佛坐像	Yecheon County, North Gyeongsang	1980-08-23	
668-1		Relics Related to General Gwon Eung-su 권응수장군유물-권응수초상 權應銖將軍遺物-權應銖肖像	Jinju, South Gyeongsang	1980-08-23	
668-2		Relics Related to General Gwon Eung-su 권응수장군유물-선무공신교서 權應銖將軍遺物-宣武功臣敎書	Jinju, South Gyeongsang	1980-08-23	
668-3		Relics Related to General Gwon Eung-su 권응수장군유물-태평회맹도병풍 權應銖將軍遺物-太平會盟圖屛風	Jinju, South Gyeongsang	1980-08-23	
668-4		Relics Related to General Gwon Eung-su 권응수장군유물-장검 權應銖將軍遺物-長劍	Jinju, South Gyeongsang	1980-08-23	
668-5		Relics Related to General Gwon Eung-su 권응수장군유물-유지및장군간찰 權應銖將軍遺物-有旨및將軍簡札	Jinju, South Gyeongsang	1980-08-23	
668-6		Relics Related to General Gwon Eung-su 권응수장군유물-교지 및 유서 權應銖將軍遺物-敎旨 및 諭書	Jinju, South Gyeongsang	1980-08-23	
668-7		Relics Related to General Gwon Eung-su 권응수장군유물-각대 權應銖將軍遺物-角帶	Jinju, South Gyeongsang	1980-08-23	
668-8		Relics Related to General Gwon Eung-su 권응수장군유물-가전보첩 權應銖將軍遺物-家傳寶帖	Yeongcheon, North Gyeongsang	1980-08-23	
669		Relics Related to Jeong Gi-ryong 정기룡 유물 鄭起龍 遺物	Sangju, North Gyeongsang	1980-08-23	
670		Buddhist Painting in Daeungjeon Hall of Jikjisa Temple (Buddha Triad) 직지사대웅전삼존불탱화 直指寺大雄殿三尊佛幀畵	Gimcheon, North Gyeongsang	1980-08-23	
671		Relics Related to Gwak Jae-u 곽재우 유물 일괄 郭再祐 遺物 一括	Uiryeong County, South Gyeongsang	1980-08-23	
671-1		Relics Related to Gwak Jae-u 곽재우 유물 일괄-장검 郭再祐 遺物 一括-長劍	Uiryeong County, South Gyeongsang	1980-08-23	
671-2		Relics Related to Gwak Jae-u 곽재우 유물 일괄-마구 郭再祐 遺物 一括-馬具	Uiryeong County, South Gyeongsang	1980-08-23	
671-3		Relics Related to Gwak Jae-u 곽재우 유물 일괄-포도연 郭再祐 遺物 一括-葡萄硯	Uiryeong County, South Gyeongsang	1980-08-23	
671-4		Relics Related to Gwak Jae-u 곽재우 유물 일괄-사자철인 郭再祐 遺物 一括-獅子鐵印	Uiryeong County, South Gyeongsang	1980-08-23	
671-5		Relics Related to Gwak Jae-u 곽재우 유물 일괄-화초문백지팔각대접 郭再祐 遺物 一括- 花草紋白磁八角大楪	Uiryeong County, South Gyeongsang	1980-08-23	
671-6		Relics Related to Gwak Jae-u 곽재우 유물일괄 - 갓끈 郭再祐 遺物 一括 - 갓끈	Uiryeong County, South Gyeongsang	1980-08-23	
672		Clothes Excavated from the Tomb of Kim Deok-won 김덕원묘 출토 의복 일괄 金德遠墓 出土 衣服 一括	Gangseo District, Seoul	1980-08-23	
673		Stone Ice Storage in Hyeonpung, Dalseong 달성 현풍 석빙고 達城 玄風 石氷庫	Dalseong County, Daegu	1980-09-16, 2010-12-27 renamed	
674		Three-story Stone Pagoda of Yugeumsa Temple, Yeongdeok 영덕 유금사 삼층석탑 盈德 有金寺 三層石塔	Yeongdeok County, North Gyeongsang	1980-09-16, 2010-12-27 renamed	
675		Three-story Stone Pagoda in Hwanam-ri, Yeongcheon 영천 화남리 삼층석탑 永川 華南里 三層石塔	Yeongcheon, North Gyeongsang	1980-09-16, 2010-12-27 renamed	
676		Stone Seated Buddha in Hwanam-ri, Yeongcheon 영천 화남리 석조여래좌상 永川 華南里 石造如來坐像	Yeongcheon, North Gyeongsang	1980-09-16, 2010-08-25 renamed	
677		East and West Three-story Stone Pagodas at Jangyeonsa Temple Site, Cheongdo 청도 장연사지 동·서 삼층석탑 淸道 長淵寺址 東·西 三層石塔	Cheongdo County, North Gyeongsang	1980-09-16, 2010-12-27 renamed	
678		East and West Three-story Stone Pagodas of Unmunsa Temple, Cheongdo 청도 운문사 동·서 삼층석탑 淸道 雲門寺 東·西 三層石塔	Cheongdo County, North Gyeongsang	1980-09-16, 2010-12-27 renamed	
679		Stone Standing Bodhisattva in Gwangdeok-ri, Gimcheon 김천 광덕리 석조보살입상 金泉 廣德里 石造菩薩立像	Gimcheon, North Gyeongsang	1980-09-16, 2010-08-25 renamed	
680		Rock-carved Buddha Triad in Sinam-ri, Yeongju 영주 신암리 마애여래삼존상 榮州 新岩里 磨崖如來三尊像	Yeongju, North Gyeongsang	1980-09-16, 2010-08-25 renamed	
681		Stone Seated Buddha of Heukseoksa Temple, Yeongju 영주 흑석사 석조여래좌상 榮州 黑石寺 石造如來坐像	Yeongju, North Gyeongsang	1980-09-16, 2010-08-25 renamed	
682		Three-story Stone Pagoda of Jibosa Temple, Gunwi 군위 지보사 삼층석탑 軍威 持寶寺 三層石塔	Gunwi County, Daegu	1980-09-16, 2010-12-27 renamed	
683		Seven-story Stone Pagoda in Sango-ri, Sangju 상주 상오리 칠층석탑 尙州 上吾里 七層石塔	Sangju, North Gyeongsang	1980-09-16, 2010-12-27 renamed	
~~684~~		~~Rotating Sutra Case of Yongmunsa Temple, Yecheon~~; ~~예천 용문사 윤장대~~; ~~醴泉 龍門寺 輪藏臺~~	~~Yecheon County, North Gyeongsang~~	1980-09-16, 2019-12-02 removed, made National Treasure No. 328	
685		Avatamsaka Sutra (The Flower Garland Sutra), Jin Version, Volume 4 대방광불화엄경 진본 권4 大方廣佛華嚴經 晋本 卷四	Jung District, Seoul	1981-03-18	
686		Avatamsaka Sutra (The Flower Garland Sutra), Jin Version, Volume 28 대방광불화엄경 진본 권28 大方廣佛華嚴經 晋本 卷二十八	Jung District, Seoul	1981-03-18	
687		Avatamsaka Sutra (The Flower Garland Sutra), Zhou Version, Volume 66 대방광불화엄경 주본 권66 大方廣佛華嚴經 周本 卷六十六	Jung District, Seoul	1981-03-18	
688		Avatamsaka Sutra (The Flower Garland Sutra), Zhou Version, Volumes 17 and 52 대방광불화엄경 주본 권17, 52 大方廣佛華嚴經 周本 卷十七, 五十二	Jung District, Seoul	1981-03-18	
689		Avatamsaka Sutra (The Flower Garland Sutra), Zhenyuan Version, Volume 7 대방광불화엄경 정원본 권7 大方廣佛華嚴經 貞元本 卷七	Jung District, Seoul	1981-03-18	
690		Avatamsaka Sutra (The Flower Garland Sutra), Zhou Version, Volume 6 대방광불화엄경 주본 권6 大方廣佛華嚴經 周本 卷六	Jung District, Seoul	1981-03-18	
691		Nilakantha dharani (The Great Compassion Mantra) 불정심관세음보살대다라니경 佛頂心觀世音菩薩大陀羅尼經	Yongsan District, Seoul	1981-03-18	
691-1		Nilakantha dharani (The Great Compassion Mantra) 불정심관세음보살대다라니경-일자정륜왕다라니 佛頂心觀世音菩薩大陀羅尼經-一字頂輪王陀羅尼	Yongsan District, Seoul	1981-03-18	
691-2		Nilakantha dharani (The Great Compassion Mantra) 불정심관세음보살대다라니경-자재왕치온독다라니 佛頂心觀世音菩薩大陀羅尼經-自在王治溫毒陀羅尼	Yongsan District, Seoul	1981-03-18	
691-3		Nilakantha dharani (The Great Compassion Mantra) 불정심관세음보살대다라니경-관세음보살보문품 佛頂心觀世音菩薩大陀羅尼經-觀世音菩薩普門品	Yongsan District, Seoul	1981-03-18	
692-1		Saddharmapundarika Sutra (The Lotus Sutra), Volume 7 묘법연화경 권7 妙法蓮華經 卷7	Geumjeong District, Busan	1981-03-18	
692-2		Saddharmapundarika Sutra (The Lotus Sutra), Volume 7 묘법연화경 권7 妙法蓮華經 卷七	Yongsan District, Seoul	1981-03-18	
693		Saddharmapundarika Sutra (The Lotus Sutra) 묘법연화경 妙法蓮華經	Yongsan District, Seoul	1981-03-18	
694-1		Buljo samgyeong (The Three Sutras) 불조삼경 佛祖三經	Yongsan District, Seoul	1981-03-18, 2012-02-22 renumbered	
694-2		Buljo samgyeong (The Three Sutras) 불조삼경 佛祖三經	Naju, South Jeolla	2012-02-22	
695		Buljo samgyeong (The Three Sutras) 불조삼경 佛祖三經	Yongsan District, Seoul	1981-03-18	
696		Vajracchedika prajnaparamita Sutra (The Diamond Sutra) 금강반야바라밀경 金剛般若波羅密經	Jung District, Seoul	1981-03-18	
697		Naonghwasang eorok (Sermons by Buddhist Monk Naong) and Naonghwasang gasong (Poems by Buddhist Monk Naong) 나옹화상어록 및 나옹화상가송 懶翁和尙語錄 및 懶翁和尙歌頌	Yongin, Gyeonggi	1981-03-18	
698		Shurangama Sutra (The Sutra of the Heroic One), Korean Translation, Volumes 6-10 대불정여래밀인수증요의제보살만행수능엄경 권6∼10 大佛頂如來密因修證了義諸菩薩萬行首楞嚴經 卷六∼十	Yongsan District, Seoul	1981-03-18	
699		Shurangama Sutra (The Sutra of the Heroic One), Korean Translation, Volumes 6-10 대불정여래밀인수증요의제보살만행수능엄경 권6∼10 大佛頂如來密因修證了義諸菩薩萬行首楞嚴經 卷六∼十	Jung District, Seoul	1981-03-18	
700-1		Seollim bohun (Teachings of Zen Buddhism) 선림보훈 禪林寶訓	Yongsan District, Seoul	1981-03-18, 2017-10-31 renumbered	
700-2		Seollim bohun (Teachings of Zen Buddhism) 선림보훈 禪林寶訓	Chungju, North Chungcheong	2017-10-31	
701		Bulseol jangsu myeoljoe hojedongjagyeong 불설장수멸죄호제동자경 佛說長壽滅罪護諸童子經	Yongsan District, Seoul	1981-03-18	
702		Hobeomnon (Treatise in Support of Buddhism) 호법론 護法論	Jung District, Seoul	1981-03-18	
703-1		Jangseung beopsu (Index of Buddhist Sutras) 장승법수 藏乘法數	Yongsan District, Seoul	1981-03-18	
703-2		Jangseung beopsu (Index of Buddhist Sutras) 장승법수 藏乘法數	Jongno District, Seoul	2012-08-24	
704		Jangseung beopsu (Index of Buddhist Sutras) 장승법수 藏乘法數	Jung District, Seoul	1981-03-18	
705		Bulseol daebo bumo eunjunggyeong (Sakyamuni's Teaching on Parental Love) 불설대보부모은중경 佛說大報父母恩重經	Yongsan District, Seoul	1981-03-18	
706		Jungyong juja hongmun (Questions and Answers on the Doctrine of the Mean) 중용주자혹문 中庸朱子或問	Seongbuk District, Seoul	1981-03-18	
707		Jungyong juja hongmun (Questions and Answers on the Doctrine of the Mean) 중용주자혹문 中庸朱子或問	Jung District, Seoul	1981-03-18	
708		Geubam seonsaeng sijip (Anthology of Poems by Min Sa-pyeong) 급암선생시집 及菴先生詩集	Jung District, Seoul	1981-03-18	
709		Seolgok sigo (Anthology of Poems by Jeong Po) 설곡시고 雪谷詩藁	Jung District, Seoul	1981-03-18	
710-1		Donginjimun sayuk (Anthology of Poems of Silla and Goryeo Literati), Volumes 1-3, 4-6, 10-12, and 13-15 동인지문사육 권1~3, 4~6, 10~12, 13~15 東人之文四六 卷一∼三, 四~六, 十~十二, 十三~十五	Seongbuk District, Seoul	1981-03-18	
710-2		Donginjimun sayuk (Anthology of Poems of Silla and Goryeo Literati), Volumes 1-6 동인지문사육-권1~6 東人之文四六-卷1~6	Seongbuk District, Seoul	1981-03-18	
710-3		Donginjimun sayuk (Anthology of Poems of Silla and Goryeo Literati), Volumes 10-12 동인지문사육-권10~12 東人之文四六-卷10∼12	Seocho District, Seoul	1981-03-18	
710-4		Donginjimun sayuk (Anthology of Poems of Silla and Goryeo Literati), Volumes 13-15 동인지문사육-권13~15 東人之文四六-卷13∼15	Seodaemun District, Seoul	1981-03-18	
710-5		Donginjimun sayuk (Anthology of Poems of Silla and Goryeo Literati), Volumes 7-9 동인지문사육-권7~9 東人之文四六-卷7~9	Seongbuk District, Seoul	1981-03-18	
710-6		Donginjimun sayuk (Anthology of Poems of Silla and Goryeo Literati), Volumes 7-9 동인지문사육-권7~9 東人之文四六-卷7~9	Dalseo District, Daegu		
~~711~~		~~동인지문46 권1∼6~~; ~~東人之文四六<卷一∼六>)~~	~~Seongbuk District, Seoul~~	1981-03-18, 2002-08-05 removed	
~~712~~		동인지문46 권10∼12 東人之文四六<卷十∼十二>	~~Seocho District, Seoul~~	1981-03-18, 2002-08-05 removed	
~~713~~		~~동인지문46 권13∼15~~; ~~東人之文四六<卷十三∼十五>~~	~~Jung District, Seoul~~	1981-03-18, 2002-08-05 removed	
~~714~~		~~동인지문46 권7∼9~~; ~~東人之文四六<卷七∼九>~~	~~Seongbuk District, Seoul~~	1981-03-18, 2002-08-05 removed	
715		Portrait of Kim Jung-man 김중만 초상 金重萬 肖像	Anseong, Gyeonggi	1981-03-18	
716		Royal Certificate of Meritorious Subject Issued to Kim Gil-tong 김길통 좌리공신교서 金吉通 佐理功臣敎書	Cheongju, North Chungcheong	1981-03-18	
717		Portrait of Ju Se-bung 주세붕 초상 周世鵬 肖像	Yeongju, North Gyeongsang	1981-03-18	
718		Documents of the Gorimgun Branch of the Jeonju Yi Clan 전주이씨 고림군파 종중 문서 일괄 全州李氏 高林君派 宗中 文書 一括	Jeonju, North Jeolla	1981-03-18	
718-1		전주이씨고림군파종중문서 - 허여문기 全州李氏高林君派宗中文書 - 許與文記	Jeonju, North Jeolla	1981-03-18	
718-2		전주이씨고림군파종중문서 - 동복화회문기 全州李氏高林君派宗中文書 - 同腹和會文記	Jeonju, North Jeolla	1981-03-18	
718-3		전주이씨고림군파종중문서 - 동복화회입의 全州李氏高林君派宗中文書 - 同腹和會立議	Jeonju, North Jeolla	1981-03-18	
718-4		전주이씨고림군파종중문서 - 동복화회성문 全州李氏高林君派宗中文書 - 同腹和會成文	Jeonju, North Jeolla	1981-03-18	
719		Assorted and Annotated Mahavaipulya purnabudha Sutra (The Complete Enlightenment Sutra), Volume 3 원각류해 권3 圓覺類解 卷三	Jung District, Seoul	1981-07-15	
720-1		Commentary on the Vajracchedika prajnaparamita Sutra (The Diamond Sutra) 금강반야경소론찬요조현록 金剛般若經疏論纂要助顯錄	Jung District, Seoul	1981-07-15	
720-2		Commentary on the Vajracchedika prajnaparamita Sutra (The Diamond Sutra) 금강반야경소론찬요조현록 金剛般若經疏論纂要助顯錄	Cheongju, North Chungcheong	2012-04-25	
721		Vajracchedika prajnaparamita Sutra (The Diamond Sutra) 금강반야바라밀경 金剛般若波羅密經	Jung District, Seoul	1981-07-15	
722		Samguk sagi (History of the Three Kingdoms), Volumes 44-50 삼국사기 권44~50 三國史記 卷四十四∼五十	Jung District, Seoul	1981-07-15	
~~723~~		~~Samguk sagi (History of the Three Kingdoms)~~; ~~삼국사기~~; ~~三國史記~~	~~Jung District, Seoul~~	1981-07-15, 2018-02-22 removed, made National Treasure No. 322-2	
724		Documents of the Seongju Do Clan 성주도씨 종중 문서 일괄 星州都氏 宗中 文書 一括	Nonsan, South Chungcheong	1981-07-15	
724-1		성주도씨 종중 문서 일괄-도응위조봉대부전의소감자홍무26년10월일 星州都氏 宗中 文書 一括-都膺爲朝奉大夫典醫小監者洪武26年10月日	Nonsan, South Chungcheong	1981-07-15	
724-2		성주도씨 종중 문서 일괄-도응위선절장군흥위위좌령장군자홍무27년9월일 星州都氏 宗中 文書 一括-都膺爲宣節將軍興威衛左領將軍者洪武27年9月日	Nonsan, South Chungcheong	1981-07-15	
724-3		성주도씨 종중 문서 일괄-도응위선절장군용무위사좌령장군자홍무28년2월13 星州都氏 宗中 文書 一括-都膺爲宣節將軍龍武衛司左領將軍者洪武28年2月13日	Nonsan, South Chungcheong	1981-07-15	
724-4		성주도씨 종중 문서 일괄-도응위보공장군호용순위사섭대장군자홍무30년12월초 10일 星州都氏 宗中 文書 一括-都膺爲保功將軍虎勇巡衛司攝大將軍者洪武30年12月初10日	Nonsan, South Chungcheong	1981-07-15	
724-5		성주도씨 종중 문서 일괄-녹패준사선절장군흥위위좌령장군도응 星州都氏 宗中 文書 一括-祿牌准賜宣節將軍興威衛左領將軍都膺	Nonsan, South Chungcheong	1981-07-15	
725		Documents of the Namwon Yang Clan 남원양씨 종중 문서 일괄 南原楊氏 宗中 文書 一括	Jeonju, North Jeolla	1981-07-15	
725-1		남원양씨 종중 문서 일괄-양이시급제홍패지정15년 南原楊氏 宗中 文書 一括-楊以時及第紅牌至正15年	Jeonju, North Jeolla	1981-07-15	
725-2		남원양씨 종중 문서 일괄-양수생급제홍패홍무9년 南原楊氏 宗中 文書 一括-楊首生及第紅牌洪武9年	Jeonju, North Jeolla	1981-07-15	
725-3		남원양씨 종중 문서 일괄-유학양공준생원삼등제59인입격자정덕2년2월일 南原楊氏 宗中 文書 一括-幼學楊公俊生員三等第59人入格者正德2年2月日	Jeonju, North Jeolla	1981-07-15	
725-4		남원양씨 종중 문서 일괄-성균생원양공준문과병과제8인급제출신자정덕15년9월25일 南原楊氏 宗中 文書 一括-成均生員楊公俊文科丙科第8人及第出身者正德15年9月25日	Jeonju, North Jeolla	1981-07-15	
725-5		남원양씨 종중 문서 일괄-생원양홍문과병과제7인급제출신자가정19년10월초9 南原楊氏 宗中 文書 一括-生員楊洪文科丙科第7人及第出身者嘉靖19年10月初9日	Jeonju, North Jeolla	1981-07-15	
725-6		남원양씨 종중 문서 일괄-양홍위통훈대부행청도군수자가정38년2월초10일 南原楊氏 宗中 文書 一括-楊洪爲通訓大夫行淸道郡守自嘉靖38年2月初10日	Jeonju, North Jeolla	1981-07-15	
725-7		남원양씨 종중 문서 일괄-유학양시성생원삼등제63인입격자만력19년8월 南原楊氏 宗中 文書 一括-幼學楊時省生員三等第63人入格者萬曆19年8月	Jeonju, North Jeolla	1981-07-15	
726		Certificate of Meritorious Subject Issued to Jang Gwan 장관 개국원종공신녹권 張寬 開國原從功臣錄券	Jeongeup, North Jeolla	1981-07-15	
727		Documents of the Namyang Jeon Clan 남양전씨 종중 문서 일괄 南陽田氏 宗中 文書 一括	Nonsan, South Chungcheong	1981-07-15	
727-1		남양전씨 종중 문서 일괄-통정대부형조참의영락14년(전흥) 南陽田氏 宗中 文書 一括-通政大夫刑曹參議永樂14년(田興)	Nonsan, South Chungcheong	1981-07-15	
727-2		남양전씨 종중 문서 일괄-가선대부인녕부윤영락15년(전흥) 南陽田氏 宗中 文書 一括-嘉善大夫仁寧府尹永樂15年(田興)	Nonsan, South Chungcheong	1981-07-15	
727-3		남양전씨 종중 문서 일괄-가선대부인순부윤선덕9년(전흥) 南陽田氏 宗中 文書 一括-嘉善大夫仁順府尹宣德9年(田興)	Nonsan, South Chungcheong	1981-07-15	
727-4		남양전씨 종중 문서 일괄-조산대부사헌장령(전가생) 南陽田氏 宗中 文書 一括-朝散大夫司憲掌令(田稼生)	Nonsan, South Chungcheong	1981-07-15	
727-5		남양전씨 종중 문서 일괄-통정대부공주진병마첨절제사공주목사경권농사천순7년 南陽田氏 宗中 文書 一括-通政大夫公州鎭兵馬僉節制使公州牧使兼勸農使天順7年	Nonsan, South Chungcheong	1981-07-15	
727-6		남양전씨 종중 문서 일괄-충순위어모장군홍치18년 전청 (南陽田氏 宗中 文書 一括-忠順衛禦侮將軍弘治18年(田淸)	Nonsan, South Chungcheong	1981-07-15	
727-7		남양전씨 종중 문서 일괄-충순위보공장군정덕10년(전우평) 南陽田氏 宗中 文書 一括-忠順衛保功將軍正德10年(田禹平)	Nonsan, South Chungcheong	1981-07-15	
727-8		남양전씨 종중 문서 일괄-유서가정44년 南陽田氏 宗中 文書 一括-遺書嘉靖44年	Nonsan, South Chungcheong	1981-07-15	
727-9		남양전씨 종중 문서 일괄-교지유학전석규진사삼등제39인입격자만력40년7월16 南陽田氏 宗中 文書 一括-敎旨幼學田錫圭進士三等第39人入格者萬曆40年7月16日	Nonsan, South Chungcheong	1981-07-15	
727-10		남양전씨 종중 문서 일괄-교지유학전해생원삼등제10인입격자천계4년10월13일 南陽田氏 宗中 文書 一括-敎旨幼學田瀣生員三等第10人入格者天啓4年10月13日	Nonsan, South Chungcheong	1981-07-15	
727-11		남양전씨 종중 문서 일괄-이조순치...7월20일봉교생원선교랑전해위선교랑행목능참봉자순치7년6월일 南陽田氏 宗中 文書 一括-吏曹順治...7月20日奉敎生員宣敎郞田瀣爲宣敎郞行穆陵參奉者順治7년6月日	Nonsan, South Chungcheong	1981-07-15	
727-12		남양전씨 종중 문서 일괄-교지,전해위조봉대부행목릉참봉자순치7년10월초8일 南陽田氏 宗中 文書 一括-敎旨,田瀣爲朝奉大夫行穆陵參奉者順治7年10月初8日	Nonsan, South Chungcheong	1981-07-15	
727-13		남양전씨 종중 문서 일괄-교지,전해위조산대부행목릉참봉자순치8년3월초3일 南陽田氏 宗中 文書 一括-敎旨,田瀣爲朝散大夫行穆陵參奉者順治8年3月初3日	Nonsan, South Chungcheong	1981-07-15	
727-14		남양전씨 종중 문서 일괄-교지,전해위봉렬대부행목릉참봉자순치8년2월18일 南陽田氏 宗中 文書 一括-敎旨,田瀣爲奉列大夫行穆陵參奉者順治8年2月18日	Nonsan, South Chungcheong	1981-07-15	
727-15		남양전씨 종중 문서 일괄-교지,전해위봉정대부행목릉참봉자순치8년3월15일 南陽田氏 宗中 文書 一括-敎旨,田瀣爲奉正大夫行穆陵參奉者順治8年3月15日	Nonsan, South Chungcheong	1981-07-15	
727-16		남양전씨 종중 문서 일괄-교지,전해위중훈대부행목릉참봉자순치8년7월11일 南陽田氏 宗中 文書 一括-敎旨,田瀣爲中訓大夫行穆陵參奉者順治8年7月11日	Nonsan, South Chungcheong	1981-07-15	
727-17		남양전씨 종중 문서 일괄-교지,전해위중직대부행목릉참봉자순치8년8월초6일 南陽田氏 宗中 文書 一括-敎旨,田瀣爲中直大夫行穆陵參奉者順治8年8月初6日	Nonsan, South Chungcheong	1981-07-15	
727-18		남양전씨 종중 문서 일괄-이조순치8년11월19일봉교학생전유성위장사랑자순치8년11월일 南陽田氏 宗中 文書 一括-吏曹順治8年11月19日奉敎學生田有成爲將仕郞者順治8年11月	Nonsan, South Chungcheong	1981-07-15	
727-19		남양전씨 종중 문서 일괄-전해위통훈대부행종묘서봉사자순치10년2월19일 南陽田氏 宗中 文書 一括-田瀣爲通訓大夫行宗廟署奉事者順治10年2月19日	Nonsan, South Chungcheong	1981-07-15	
727-20		남양전씨 종중 문서 일괄-이조순치12년12년4월27일봉교종사랑전유성위승사랑자순치12년4월일 南陽田氏 宗中 文書 一括-吏曹順治12年4月27日奉敎從仕郞田有成爲承仕郞者順治12年4月	Nonsan, South Chungcheong	1981-07-15	
727-21		남양전씨 종중 문서 일괄-이조순치18년정월일봉교전경업증통선랑공조정랑자순치18년정월일 南陽田氏 宗中 文書 一括-吏曹順治18年正月日奉敎田敬業贈通善郞工曹正郞者順治18年正月日	Nonsan, South Chungcheong	1981-07-15	
727-22		남양전씨 종중 문서 일괄-교지,전석규위통정대부자강희4년6월23일 南陽田氏 宗中 文書 一括-敎旨,田錫圭爲通政大夫者康熙4年6月23日	Nonsan, South Chungcheong	1981-07-15	
727-23		남양전씨 종중 문서 일괄-교지,전석규위절충장군행룡양위부호군자강희5년정월15일 南陽田氏 宗中 文書 一括-敎旨,田錫圭爲折衝將軍行龍양衛副護軍者康喜5年正月15日	Nonsan, South Chungcheong	1981-07-15	
727-24		남양전씨 종중 문서 일괄-교지,전석규위가선대부자강희7년6월17일 南陽田氏 宗中 文書 一括-敎旨,田錫圭爲嘉善大夫者康熙7年6月17日	Nonsan, South Chungcheong	1981-07-15	
727-25		남양전씨 종중 문서 일괄-전시택호적단자건륭9년11월일 南陽田氏 宗中 文書 一括-田時澤戶籍單子乾隆9年11月日	Nonsan, South Chungcheong	1981-07-15	
727-26		남양전씨 종중 문서 일괄-전탁호적단자건륭12년7월일 南陽田氏 宗中 文書 一括-田鐸戶籍單子乾隆12年7月日	Nonsan, South Chungcheong	1981-07-15	
727-27		남양전씨 종중 문서 일괄-전유성호적단자강희41년3월일 南陽田氏 宗中 文書 一括-田有成戶籍單子康熙41年3月日	Nonsan, South Chungcheong	1981-07-15	
728		Gwonseonmun (Words to Encourage Good Deeds) by Lady Seol 설씨부인 권선문 薛氏夫人 勸善文	Jeonju, North Jeolla	1981-07-15	
729		Royal Edict of Labor Exemption Issued to Yongmunsa Temple, Yecheon 예천 용문사 감역교지 醴泉龍門寺 減役敎旨	Yecheon County, North Gyeongsang	1981-07-15	
730		Eungjinjeon Hall of Buryeongsa Temple, Uljin 울진 불영사 응진전 蔚珍 佛影寺 應眞殿	Uljin County, North Gyeongsang	1981-07-15	
731		Gilt-bronze Standing Buddha from Borisa Temple Site, Uiryeong 의령 보리사지 금동여래입상 宜寧 菩提寺址 金銅如來立像	Seo District, Busan	1982-03-04	
732		Folding Screen of Jodaebi sasun chinggyeong jinhado (The 40th Birthday Celebration of Queen Dowager Jo) 조대비 사순칭경진하도 병풍 趙大妃 四旬稱慶陳賀圖 屛風	Seo District, Busan	1982-03-04	
733-1		Folding Screen of Heonjong garye jinhado (King Heonjong’s Wedding Celebration) 헌종가례진하도 병풍 憲宗嘉禮陳賀圖 屛風	Seo District, Busan	1982-03-04, 2011-11-01 renumbered	
733-2		Folding Screen of Heonjong garye jinhado (King Heonjong’s Wedding Celebration) 헌종가례진하도 병풍 憲宗嘉禮陳賀圖 屛風	Yongin, Gyeonggi	2011-11-01	
734		Printing Woodblocks of Miscellaneous Buddhist Scriptures in Haeinsa Temple, Hapcheon 합천 해인사 고려목판 陜川 海印寺 高麗木板	Hapcheon County, South Gyeongsang	1982-05-22	
735		Printing Woodblocks of Buddhist Scriptures in Buseoksa Temple, Yeongju 영주 부석사 고려목판 榮州 浮石寺 高麗木板	Yeongju, North Gyeongsang	1982-05-12	
735-1		영주 부석사 고려목판-대방광불화엄경진본 榮州 浮石寺 高麗木板-大方廣佛華嚴經晋本	Yeongju, North Gyeongsang	1982-05-12	
735-2		영주 부석사 고려목판-대방광불화엄경주본 榮州 浮石寺 高麗木板-大方廣佛華嚴經周本	Yeongju, North Gyeongsang	1982-05-12	
735-3		영주 부석사 고려목판-대방광불화엄경정원본 榮州 浮石寺 高麗木板-大方廣佛華嚴經貞元本	Yeongju, North Gyeongsang	1982-05-12	
736		Commentary on the Vimalakirti nirdesa Sutra (Holy Teachings of Vimalakirti), Volumes 3 and 4 정명경집해관중소 권3~4 淨名經集解關中疏 卷三~四	Seodaemun District, Seoul	1982-05-12	
737		Buljo yeokdae tongjae (Biographies of Great Buddhists Since the Birth of Sakyamuni Buddha) 불조역대통재 佛祖歷代通載	Damyang County, South Jeolla	1982-11-09	
738		Munsusaribosal choesangseung musaenggyegyeong 문수사리보살최상승무생계경 文殊師利菩薩最上乘無生戒經	Yangsan, South Gyeongsang	1982-11-09	
739		Portrait of Go Hui and Relics Related to the Buan Branch of the Jeju Go Clan 고희 초상 및 문중유물 高曦 肖像 및 門中遺物	전북 부안군	1982-11-09	
740		Transcription of Bosal Seongyegyeong (The Bodhisattva Sutra) in Silver on Indigo Paper, Volume 8 감지은니보살선계경 권8 紺紙銀泥菩薩善戒經 卷八	Jung District, Seoul	1982-12-07	
741		Agalmatolite Reliquary from the Three-story Stone Pagoda at Biroam Hermitage of Donghwasa Temple, Daegu (Presumed) 전 대구 동화사 비로암 삼층석탑 납석사리호 傳 大邱 桐華寺 毘盧庵 三層石塔 蠟石舍利壺	Jung District, Seoul	1982-12-07	
742		Stele of Buddha Triad 삼존불비상 三尊佛碑像	Jung District, Seoul	1982-12-07	
743		Pachodo (Banana Tree) by King Jeongjo 정조필 파초도 正祖筆 芭蕉圖	Jung District, Seoul	1982-12-07	
744		Gukhwado (Chrysanthemum) by King Jeongjo 정조필 국화도 正祖筆 菊花圖	Jung District, Seoul	1982-12-07	
745		Worin seokbo (Episodes from the Life of Sakyamuni Buddha) 월인석보 月印釋譜	Entire country	1983-05-07	
745-1		Worin seokbo (Episodes from the Life of Sakyamuni Buddha), Volumes 1 and 2 월인석보 권1~2 月印釋譜 卷一~二	Mapo District, Seoul	1983-05-07	
745-2		Worin seokbo (Episodes from the Life of Sakyamuni Buddha), Volumes 7 and 8 월인석보 권7,8 月印釋譜 卷7,8	Jung District, Seoul	1983-05-07	
745-3		Worin seokbo (Episodes from the Life of Sakyamuni Buddha), Volumes 9 and 10 월인석보 권9,10 月印釋譜 卷九,十	Jongno District, Seoul	1983-05-07	
745-4		Worin seokbo (Episodes from the Life of Sakyamuni Buddha), Volumes 13 and 14 월인석보 권13,14 月印釋譜 卷13,14	Seodaemun District, Seoul	1983-05-07	
745-5		Worin seokbo (Episodes from the Life of Sakyamuni Buddha), Volumes 17 and 18 월인석보 권17~18 月印釋譜 卷 十七~十八	Hongcheon County, Gangwon	1983-05-07	
745-6		Worin seokbo (Episodes from the Life of Sakyamuni Buddha), Volume 21 월인석보 권21 月印釋譜 卷二十一	Yongsan District, Seoul	1983-05-07	
745-7		Worin seokbo (Episodes from the Life of Sakyamuni Buddha), Volume 22 월인석보 권22 月印釋譜 卷二十二	Jongno District, Seoul	1983-05-07	
745-8		Worin seokbo (Episodes from the Life of Sakyamuni Buddha), Volume 23 월인석보 권23 月印釋譜 卷二十三	Jongno District, Seoul	1983-05-07	
745-9		Worin seokbo (Episodes from the Life of Sakyamuni Buddha), Volume 25 월인석보 권25 月印釋譜 卷二十五	Jangheung County, South Jeolla	1997-06-12	
745-10		Worin seokbo (Episodes from the Life of Sakyamuni Buddha), Volume 15 월인석보 권15 月印釋譜 卷十五	Sunchang County, North Jeolla	2000-12-22	
745-11		Worin seokbo (Episodes from the Life of Sakyamuni Buddha), Volume 20 월인석보 권20 月印釋譜 卷二十	Jongno District, Seoul	2006-01-17	
746		Royal Edict of Appointment Issued to Seong Seok-rin 성석린 고신왕지 成石璘 告身王旨	Jinan County, North Jeolla	1983-05-07	
747		Horse Saddle of Choe Mun-byeong, Righteous Army Commander 최문병 의병장 안장 崔文炳 義兵將 鞍裝	Gyeongsan, North Gyeongsang	1983-05-07	
748		Wooden Amitabha Buddha Altarpiece of Gyeongguksa Temple, Seoul 서울 경국사 목각아미타여래설법상 서울 慶國寺 木刻阿彌陀如來說法像	Seongbuk District, Seoul	1983-05-07	
749		Stupa of State Preceptor Wonjeung at Taegosa Temple, Goyang 고양 태고사 원증국사탑 高陽 太古寺 圓證國師塔	Goyang, Gyeonggi	1983-12-27, 2010-12-27 renamed	
750		Three-story Stone Pagoda at Geodonsa Temple Site, Wonju 원주 거돈사지 삼층석탑 原州 居頓寺址 三層石塔	Wonju, Gangwon	1983-12-27, 2010-12-27 renamed	
751		Transcription of Avatamsaka Sutra (The Flower Garland Sutra), Zhenyuan Version, in Silver on Indigo Paper, Volume 34 감지은니대방광불화엄경 정원본 권34 紺紙銀泥大方廣佛華嚴經 貞元本 卷三十四	Gwanak District, Seoul	1984-05-30	
752		Transcription of Avatamsaka Sutra (The Flower Garland Sutra) in Gold on Indigo Paper 감지금니대방광불화엄경입불사의해탈경계보현행원품 紺紙金泥大方廣佛華嚴經入不思議解脫境界普賢行願品	Gwanak District, Seoul	1984-05-30	
753		Transcription of Mahavaipulya purnabudha Sutra (The Complete Enlightenment Sutra) in Gold on Oak Paper 상지금니 대방광원각수다라요의경 橡紙金泥大方廣圓覺修多羅了義經	Gwanak District, Seoul	1984-05-30	
754		Transcription of Avatamsaka Sutra (The Flower Garland Sutra), Zhou Version, in Silver on Indigo Paper, Volume 37 감지은니대방광불화엄경 주본 권37 紺紙銀泥大方廣佛華嚴經 周本 卷三十七	Gwanak District, Seoul	1984-05-30	
755		Transcription of Avatamsaka Sutra (The Flower Garland Sutra), Zhou Version, in Silver on Indigo Paper, Volumes 5 and 6 감지은니대방광불화엄경 주본 권5~6 紺紙銀泥大方廣佛華嚴經 周本 卷五~六	Gwanak District, Seoul	1984-05-30	
756		Transcription of Shurangama Sutra (The Sutra of the Heroic One) in Gold on Indigo Paper, Volume 7 감지금니대불정여래밀인수증요의제보살만행수능엄경 권7 紺紙金泥大佛頂如來密因修證了義諸菩薩萬行首楞嚴經 卷七	Gwanak District, Seoul	1984-05-30	
757		Transcription of Avatamsaka Sutra (The Flower Garland Sutra), Zhou Version, in Gold on Indigo Paper, Volume 46 감지금니대방광불화엄경 주본 권46 紺紙金泥大方廣佛華嚴經 周本 卷四十六	Yangsan, South Gyeongsang	1984-05-30	
758-1		Nammyeong Cheon hwasangsong jeungdoga (Song of Enlightenment with Commentaries by Buddhist Monk Nammyeong) 남명천화상송증도가 南明泉和尙頌證道歌	Jongno District, Seoul	1984-05-30	
758-2		Nammyeong Cheon hwasangsong jeungdoga (Song of Enlightenment with Commentaries by Buddhist Monk Nammyeong) 남명천화상송증도가 南明泉和尙頌證道歌	Yangsan, South Gyeongsang	2012-06-29	
759		Shurangama Sutra (The Sutra of the Heroic One) 대불정여래밀인수증료의제보살만행수능엄경 大佛頂如來密因修證了義諸菩薩萬行首楞嚴經	Yongsan District, Seoul	1984-05-30	
760		Shurangama Sutra (The Sutra of the Heroic One), Korean Translation, Volume 1 대불정여래밀인수증요의제보살만행수능엄경(언해) 권1 大佛頂如來密因修證了義諸菩薩萬行首楞嚴經(諺解) 卷一	Jung District, Seoul	1984-05-30	
761		Shurangama Sutra (The Sutra of the Heroic One), Korean Translation, Volumes 2 and 5 대불정여래밀인수증요의제보살만행수능엄경(언해) 권2, 5 大佛頂如來密因修證了義諸菩薩萬行首楞嚴經(諺解) 卷二, 五	Gwanak District, Seoul	1984-05-30	
762		Shurangama Sutra (The Sutra of the Heroic One), Korean Translation, Volumes 7 and 8 대불정여래밀인수증요의제보살만행수능엄경(언해) 권7, 8 大佛頂如來密因修證了義諸菩薩萬行首楞嚴經(諺解) 卷七, 八	Jung District, Seoul	1984-05-30	
763		Shurangama Sutra (The Sutra of the Heroic One), Korean Translation, Volumes 7-8 and 9-10 대불정여래밀인수증요의제보살만행수능엄경(언해) 권7~8, 9~10 大佛頂如來密因修證了義諸菩薩萬行首楞嚴經(諺解) 卷七∼八, 九~十	Dongdaemun District, Seoul	1984-05-30	
764		Shurangama Sutra (The Sutra of the Heroic One), Korean Translation, Volumes 2, 3, 4, 6, 7, 8, 9, and 10 대불정여래밀인수증요의제보살만행수능엄경(언해) 권2, 3, 4, 6, 7, 8, 9, 10 大佛頂如來密因修證了義諸菩薩萬行首楞嚴經(諺解) 卷二, 三, 四, 六, 七, 八, 九, 十	Seodaemun District, Seoul	1984-05-30	
765		Shurangama Sutra (The Sutra of the Heroic One), Korean Translation 대불정여래밀인수증요의제보살만행수능엄경(언해) 大佛頂如來密因修證了義諸菩薩萬行首楞嚴經(諺解)	Gwanak District, Seoul	1984-05-30	
766-1		Saddharmapundarika Sutra (The Lotus Sutra), Volumes 4-7 묘법연화경 권4~7 妙法蓮華經 卷四∼七	Seodaemun District, Seoul	1984-05-30	
767-1		Mongsanhwasang beobeo yangnok (Sermons of Buddhist Monk Mongsan with Commentaries in Korean) 몽산화상법어략록(언해) 蒙山和尙法語略錄(諺解)	Jung District, Seoul	1984-05-30, 2017-03-08 renumbered	
767-2		Mongsanhwasang beobeo yangnok (Sermons of Buddhist Monk Mongsan with Commentaries in Korean) 몽산화상법어략록(언해) 蒙山和尙法語略錄(諺解)	Seocho District, Seoul	1984-05-30, 2017-03-08 renumbered	
767-3		Mongsanhwasang beobeo yangnok (Sermons of Buddhist Monk Mongsan with Commentaries in Korean) 몽산화상법어략록(언해) 蒙山和尙法語略錄(諺解)	Gwanak District, Seoul	1993-09-10, 2017-03-08 renumbered	
767-4		Mongsanhwasang beobeo yangnok (Sermons of Buddhist Monk Mongsan with Commentaries in Korean) 몽산화상법어략록(언해) 蒙山和尙法語略錄(諺解)	Yongsan District, Seoul	2017-03-08	
~~768~~		~~Mongsanhwasang beobeo yangnok (Sermons of Buddhist Monk Mongsan with Commentaries in Korean)~~; ~~몽산화상법어략록(언해)~~; ~~蒙山和尙法語略錄(諺解)~~	~~Seocho District, Seoul~~	1984-05-30, 2017-03-08 changed	
769		Mongsanhwasang beobeo yangnok (Sermons of Buddhist Monk Mongsan with Commentaries in Korean) 몽산화상법어략록(언해) 蒙山和尙法語略綠 (諺解)	Dongdaemun District, Seoul	1984-05-30	
770		Moguja susimgyeol (Golden Teachings on Mind Cultivation), Korean Translation 목우자수심결(언해) 牧牛子修沁訣(諺解)	Gwanak District, Seoul	1984-05-30	
771		Commentary on the Prajnaparamita hridaya Sutra (The Heart Sutra), Korean Translation 반야바라밀다심경략소(언해) 般若波羅蜜多心經略疏(諺解)	Gwanak District, Seoul	1984-05-30	
772-1		Vajracchedika prajnaparamita Sutra (The Diamond Sutra) with Commentaries by Three Masters, Volumes 1 and 5 금강경삼가해 권1, 5 金剛經三家解 卷一, 五	Dongdaemun District, Seoul	1984-05-30	
772-2 (Note: 구 773호)		Vajracchedika prajnaparamita Sutra (The Diamond Sutra) with Commentaries by Three Masters, Volumes 2, 3, 4, and 5 금강경삼가해 권2, 3, 4, 5 金剛經三家解 卷二, 三, 四, 五	Gwanak District, Seoul	1984-05-30, 2002-08-05	
774-1		Seonjong yeonggajip (Essence of Zen Buddhism), Korean Translation 선종영가집(언해) 禪宗永嘉集(諺解)	Jung District, Seoul	1984-05-30	
774-2		Seonjong yeonggajip (Essence of Zen Buddhism), Korean Translation 선종영가집(언해) 禪宗永嘉集(諺解)	Sancheong County, South Gyeongsang	2010-12-21	
775		Vajracchedika prajnaparamita Sutra (The Diamond Sutra) 금강반야바라밀경 金剛般若波羅蜜經	Jung District, Seoul	1984-05-30	
776		Sword with Ring Pommel 환두대도 環頭大刀	Yongsan District, Seoul	1984-08-06	
777		Gilt-bronze Padlocks 금동 자물쇠 일괄 金銅鎖金一括	Yongsan District, Seoul	1984-08-06	
778		Bronze Incense Burner with Silver-inlaid Willow and Waterfowl Design 청동은입사포류수금문향완 靑銅銀入絲蒲柳水禽文香垸	Yongsan District, Seoul	1984-08-06	
779		Gilt-bronze Standing Buddha 금동여래입상 金銅如來立像	Yongsan District, Seoul	1984-08-06	
780		Gilt-bronze Standing Bodhisattva 금동보살입상 金銅菩薩立像	Yongsan District, Seoul	1984-08-06	
781		Gilt-bronze Roof Tile in the Shape of a Dragon-head 금동용두토수 金銅龍頭吐首	Yongsan District, Seoul	1984-08-06	
782		Album of Paintings from Byeongjin Year (1796) by Kim Hong-do 김홍도필 병진년 화첩 金弘道筆 丙辰年 畵帖	Yongsan District, Seoul	1984-08-06	
783		Dongja gyeollyeodo (A Boy Pulling a Donkey) by Kim Si 김시필 동자견려도 金禔筆 童子牽驢圖	Yongsan District, Seoul	1984-08-06	
784		Painting of Ksitigarbha Bodhisattva 지장도 地藏圖	Yongsan District, Seoul	1984-08-06	
785		White Porcelain Bottle with Cloud and Dragon Design in Underglaze Cobalt Blue 백자 청화운룡문 병 白磁 靑畵雲龍文 甁	Yongsan District, Seoul	1984-08-06	
786		White Porcelain Bottle with Cloud and Dragon Design in Underglaze Cobalt Blue 백자 청화운룡문 병 白磁 靑畵雲龍文 甁	Yongsan District, Seoul	1984-08-06	
787		Buncheong Jar with Fish Design in Underglaze Iron 분청사기 철화어문 항아리 粉靑沙器 鐵畵魚文 立壺	Yongsan District, Seoul	1984-08-06	
788		White Porcelain Jar with Carp Design in Underglaze Cobalt Blue 백자 청화잉어문 항아리 白磁 靑畵鯉魚文 立壺	Yongsan District, Seoul	1984-08-06	
789		Celadon Pillow in the Shape of Twin Lions 청자 쌍사자형 베개 靑磁 雙獅子形 枕	Yongsan District, Seoul	1984-08-06	
790		Geungnakjeon Hall of Baekheungam Hermitage of Eunhaesa Temple, Yeongcheon 영천 은해사 백흥암 극락전 永川 銀海寺 百興庵 極樂殿	Yeongcheon, North Gyeongsang	1984-07-05	
791		White Porcelain Flat Bottle with Inlaid Peony Leaf Design 백자 상감모란잎문 편병 白磁 象嵌牡丹葉文 扁甁	Seocho District, Seoul	1984-08-31	
792		Portrait of Yi Sang-gil 이상길초상 李尙吉肖像	Jeonju, North Jeolla	1984-08-31	
793		Excavated Relics from the Wooden Seated Child Manjusri of Sangwonsa Temple, Pyeongchang 평창 상원사 목조문수동자좌상 복장유물 平昌 上院寺 木造文殊童子坐像 腹藏遺物	Pyeongchang County, Gangwon	1984-10-15	
794		Stone Buddhas in Four Directions in Hwajeon-ri, Yesan 예산 화전리 석조사면불상 禮山 花田里 石造四面佛像	Yesan County, South Chungcheong	1984-11-30, 2010-08-25 renamed	
795		Three-story Stone Pagoda of Cheongwansa Temple, Jangheung 장흥 천관사 삼층석탑 長興 天冠寺 三層石塔	Jangheung County, South Jeolla	1984-11-30, 2010-12-27 renamed	
796		Nine-story Stone Pagoda of Unjusa Temple, Hwasun 화순 운주사 구층석탑 和順 雲住寺 九層石塔	Hwasun County, South Jeolla	1984-11-30, 2010-12-27 renamed	
797		Shrine of Stone Buddha at Unjusa Temple, Hwasun 화순 운주사 석조불감 和順 雲住寺 石造佛龕	Hwasun County, South Jeolla	1984-11-30, 2010-12-27 renamed	
798		Cylindrical Multi-story Stone Pagoda of Unjusa Temple, Hwasun 화순 운주사 원형 다층석탑 和順 雲住寺 圓形 多層石塔	Hwasun County, South Jeolla	1984-11-30, 2010-12-27 renamed	
799		Five-story Stone Pagoda of Magoksa Temple, Gongju 공주 마곡사 오층석탑 公州 麻谷寺 五層石塔	Gongju, South Chungcheong	1984-11-30, 2010-12-27 renamed	
800		Yeongsanjeon Hall of Magoksa Temple, Gongju 공주 마곡사 영산전 公州 麻谷寺 靈山殿	Gongju, South Chungcheong	1984-11-30	
801		Daeungbojeon Hall of Magoksa Temple, Gongju 공주 마곡사 대웅보전 公州 麻谷寺 大雄寶殿	Gongju, South Chungcheong	1984-11-30	
802		Daegwangbojeon Hall of Magoksa Temple, Gongju 공주 마곡사 대광보전 公州 麻谷寺 大光寶殿	Gongju, South Chungcheong	1984-11-30	
803		Daeungjeon Hall of Chamdangam Hermitage of Seonunsa Temple, Gochang 고창 선운사 참당암 대웅전 高敞 禪雲寺 懺堂庵 大雄殿	Gochang County, North Jeolla	1984-11-30	
804		Daeungjeon Hall of Jeonghyesa Temple, Suncheon 순천 정혜사 대웅전 順天 定慧寺 大雄殿	Suncheon, South Jeolla	1984-11-30	
805		Jijangjeon Hall of Bukjijangsa Temple, Daegu 대구 북지장사 지장전 大邱 北地藏寺 地藏殿	Dong District, Daegu	1984-11-30	
806		White Porcelain Lidded Bowl 백자 반합 白磁 飯盒	Gwanak District, Seoul	1984-12-07	
807		White Porcelain Bottle with Inlaid Peony Design 백자 상감모란문 병 白磁 象嵌牡丹文 甁	Gwanak District, Seoul	1984-12-07	
808		Gilt-bronze Standing Sakyamuni Buddha at Birth 금동탄생불입상 金銅誕生佛立像	Gwanak District, Seoul	1984-12-07	
