= Eunjin =

Rural district of Nonsan, South Korea

- Hangul: 은진면
- Hanja: 恩津面
- RR: Eunjin-myeon
- MR: Ŭnjin-myŏn

Eunjin (Korean: 은진면) is a myeon, or rural district, of Nonsan, South Korea. Located in the southwestern portion of Nonsan, it covers 22.3 square kilometers, and has a population of 5,983.

Eunjin is best known for the giant standing stone Buddha called the Eunjin Mireuk, a popular place to visit for all South Koreans. The statue is 18.12 meters tall. It was completed in 968, in the nineteenth year of the reign of King Gwangjong, after 37 years of construction.

== Notes ==
1. "일반현황". Eunjin local government website.
