= Konyang University =

University in Nonsan, South Korea

Coordinates: 36.1822°N 127.1117°E

- 건앙대학교
- Type: Private
- Established: 1991
- President: Kim Hi-soo
- Location: Nonsan, South Chungcheong, South Korea

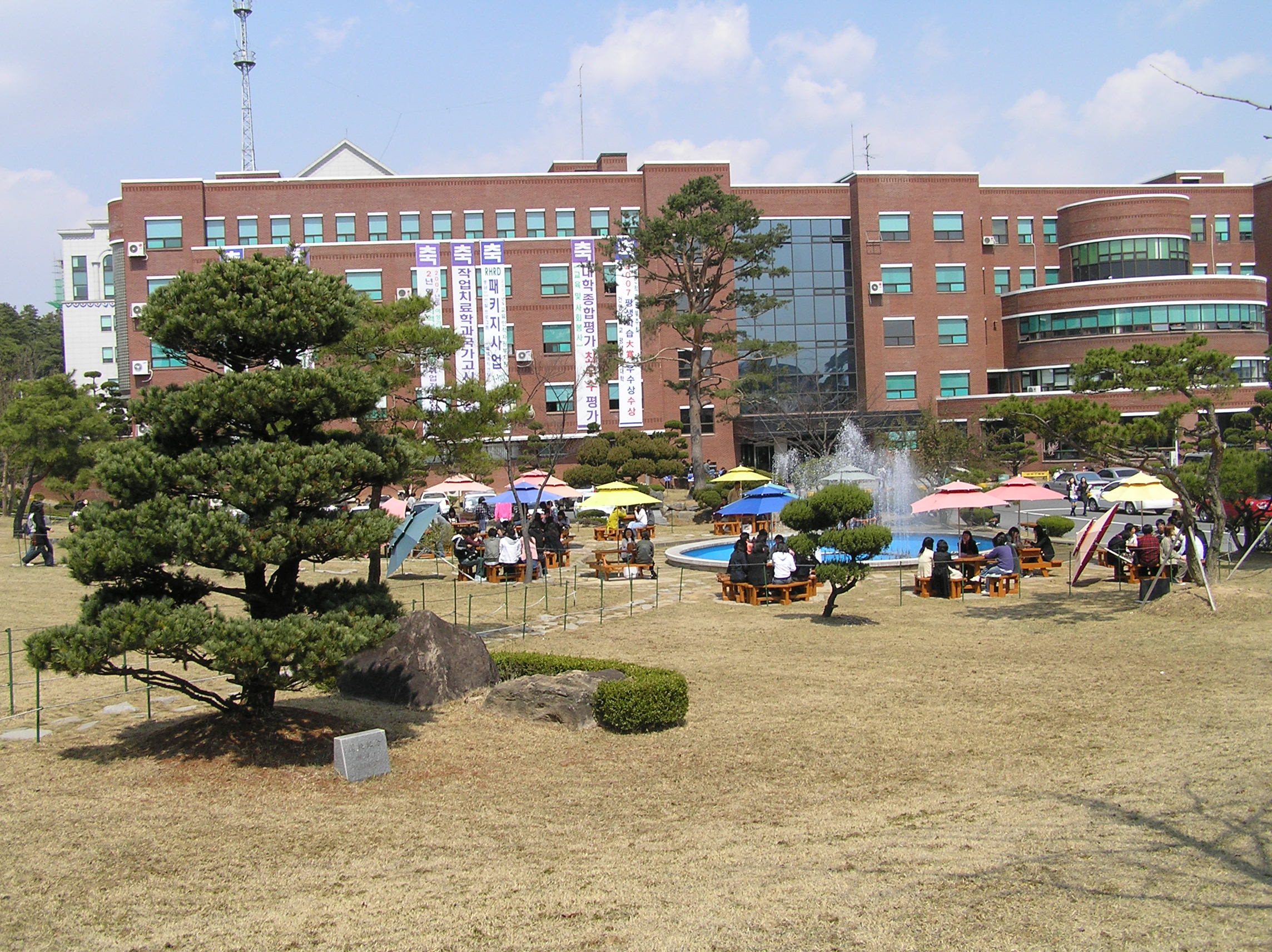
Konyang Union (GCC Building)

Konyang University (건양대학교; RR: Geonyang), located in Nonsan, South Korea, was founded in 1991.

Konyang University has campuses in Nonsan and Daejeon. The Nonsan campus is the main campus with over 10,000 undergraduate students, eight colleges with more than forty majors, mostly in applied fields About 230 of the students are foreign students. The Daejeon campus has programs in Western medicine, medical technology, and nursing. The university has about 700 graduate students. It is accredited by the Korean Council for University Education .

In 2011, Konyang was one of four private ROK universities that began offering military science as a major.

The university president is Dr. Kim Hi-soo, recipient of the 2006 South Korean Mugunghwa Order of Civil Merit Medal (국민훈상무궁화장) prize for outstanding citizen, for his work in fostering education.

In 2013, as part of a major reorientation of the nation's tertiary educational system and in part in response to the significantly changing demographics, the country's government announced a change in financial support to both public and private universities. Schools that have not been performing well would have their support drastically cut. At the same time, institutions could apply or grants to support specific projects. The winning schools were announced in mid-2014. Konyang had submitted seven different projects. All of them were funded in full, for a total of 49 billion won in support.

== Achievements ==
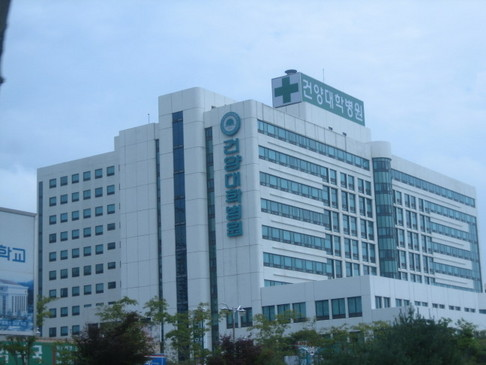
Konyang University Hospital.

=== ACE ===
In 2010, the university was one of eleven schools in the country to be "selected for support under the Advancement of College Education [A.C.E.] program, which aims to boost excellence in teaching" (englishnews@chosun.com / Jun. 10, 2010 11:10 KST) Part of the program that Konyang laid out that garnered the A.C.E. was what the university calls the e-portfolio. This system, still expanding, is in part like a career-management system, in which a student's essential data are electronically stored and managed for employment counseling. Beyond these basics, the system also encourages entering assignments and volunteer and extracurricular activities into the portfolio as well as taking exams via it. Beyond that, students can add or create anything related to their education that they wish. Another aspect of the e-portfolio is the instructor's use. Instructors can post lectures and other materials for students as well as enter grades and other details of classes.

=== LINC ===
In 2012, Konyang University was one of 37 Korean universities that were selected by the Ministry of Education, Science and Technology for the LINC (Leaders in INdustry-university Cooperation) program. The designation is for schools which will be given special support for innovation in technology and industry-university cooperation during the following five years. Konyang's two to four billion won will be for an on-site type program. One outcome of LINC industry is CICS (College of Interdisciplinary & Creative Studies) in Konyang University.

=== PRIME ===
In 2016, the university was one of twenty-one universities chosen by the Korean Ministry of Education to be part of PRIME (PRogram for Industrial needs-Matched Education), a project designed to reduce quotas for incoming students in the humanities and social sciences and increase the numbers in engineering fields. The program, which will provide billions of wons (millions of dollars) to the schools, will run for three years starting in 2017.

=== CICS (College of Interdisciplinary & Creative Studies) ===
CICS is an experimental, student-centered college of Konyang University organized in 2012 and opened in 2013. The purpose of CICS is to produce broadly educated individuals who can meet modern corporate needs. CICS is composed of four schools and one division (Global Frontier School, Medical Bioscience School, the School of Integrated Information Technology and Digital Design School; Liberal Arts) and the students take 4 weeks concentrated education. Through this education process, graduated student will have 2 majors (in one's major & Liberal Arts) and a minor in a field in one of the other schools.

=== Placement of Graduates ===
For four years in a row it ranked first among universities of its size category in South Korea in percentage of graduates being placed in jobs." The manner in which job placement is evaluated has since changed, but the university has remained a leader in placement of graduates. For example, in 2013 it ranked third in the nation among four-year schools.

== Prominent faculty ==
- Kim Tae-woo, professor emeritus and former head of Korea Institute for National Unification
- Lee Yoon-jin, professor of Environmental Engineering
