= Tapjeong Reservoir =

South Korean reservoir

- Tapjeongho
- 탑정 저수지 (Korean)
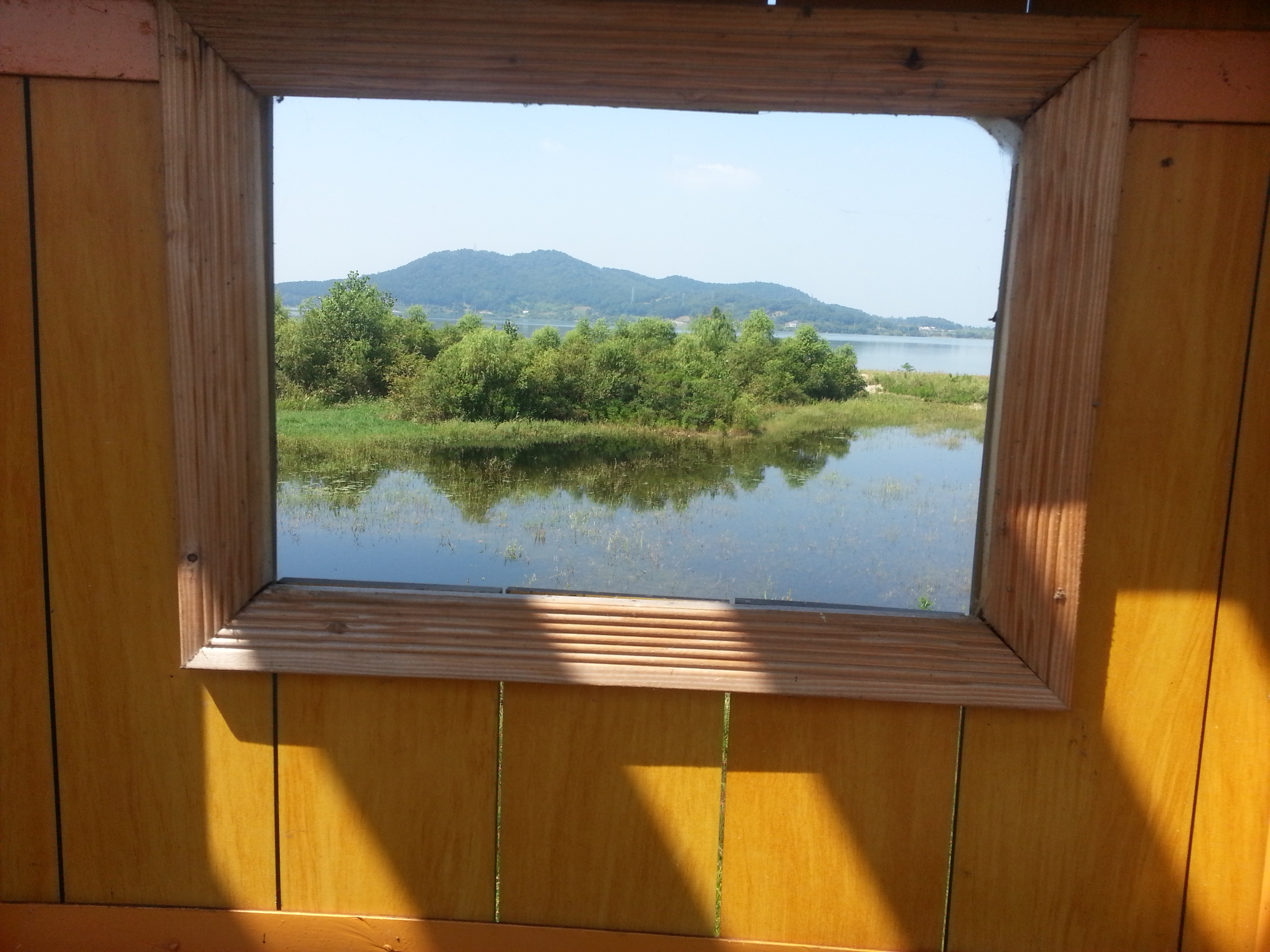
- View through a window of an observation building on the fishing jetty in the reservoir
- Interactive map of Tapjeong Reservoir
- Location: Nonsan, Hoseo
- Coordinates: 36.177°N 127.175°E
- Type: Reservoir
- Basin countries: South Korea
- Built: 1944
- Surface area: 5,117 ha (12,640 acres)
- Water volume: 31,611,000 m^{3} (1.1163×10^{9} cu ft)

Tapjeong Reservoir (Korean: 탑정 저수지; also Korean: 탑정호; RR: Tapjeongho) is a reservoir that has been classified as the second great scenic location in Nonsan, South Korea by the municipality. It is located in Mujeok-myeon, Gayagok-myeon, and Yangchon-myeon in Nonsan, outside of the city proper. Freshwater fish such as carp, mandarin, and catfish are in the body of water. Other significant fauna include cockscomb pearl mussels and golden and red-bellied frogs. The water is used in part for irrigation of down-stream farms. The dam was recently re-built. There are a number of hotels and restaurants along the circumferential road where it is near the dam. Swimming is prohibited, though fishing is permitted and boating, including water-skiing, on the lake.

== History ==
The reservoir was constructed from 1941 to 1944.

During the second decade of the twenty-first century, work was completed on the waterfront, including an "eco-park" with walkways over a part of the reservoir and introduced aquatic and terrestrial plants.

During the drought of 2012, the lowered water level in the reservoir killed more than two thousand of the rare large mussels.

== Statistics ==
- Watershed area: 21,880 ha (54,100 acres)
- Storage capacity: 31,611,000 m^{3} (1.1163×10^{9} cu ft)
- Irrigation area: 5,117 ha (12,640 acres)
