= Cristaria multiflora =

Scientific classification
- Kingdom: Plantae
- Clade: Tracheophytes
- Clade: Angiosperms
- Clade: Eudicots
- Clade: Rosids
- Order: Malvales
- Family: Malvaceae
- Genus: Cristaria
- Species: C. multiflora

Binomial name
- Cristaria multiflora Gay

Synonyms
- Cristaria elegans Gay; Cristaria glabrata Phil.

Species of plant

Cristaria multiflora is a species of flowering plant in the family Malvaceae. It is a subshrub native to northern and north-central Chile, where it grows primarily in desert and dry shrubland.
