= Yeonsan-myeon =

Coordinates: 36°13′50″N 127°11′55″E

- Hangul: 연산면
- Hanja: 連山面
- RR: Yeonsan-myeon
- MR: Yŏnsan-myŏn

Yeonsan-myeon is a part of Nonsan, South Korea. It is a small township (-myeon), located on the rail line between Nonsan proper and Daejeon. It holds an annual jujube festival, and Hanmin University is located in Yeonsan.
