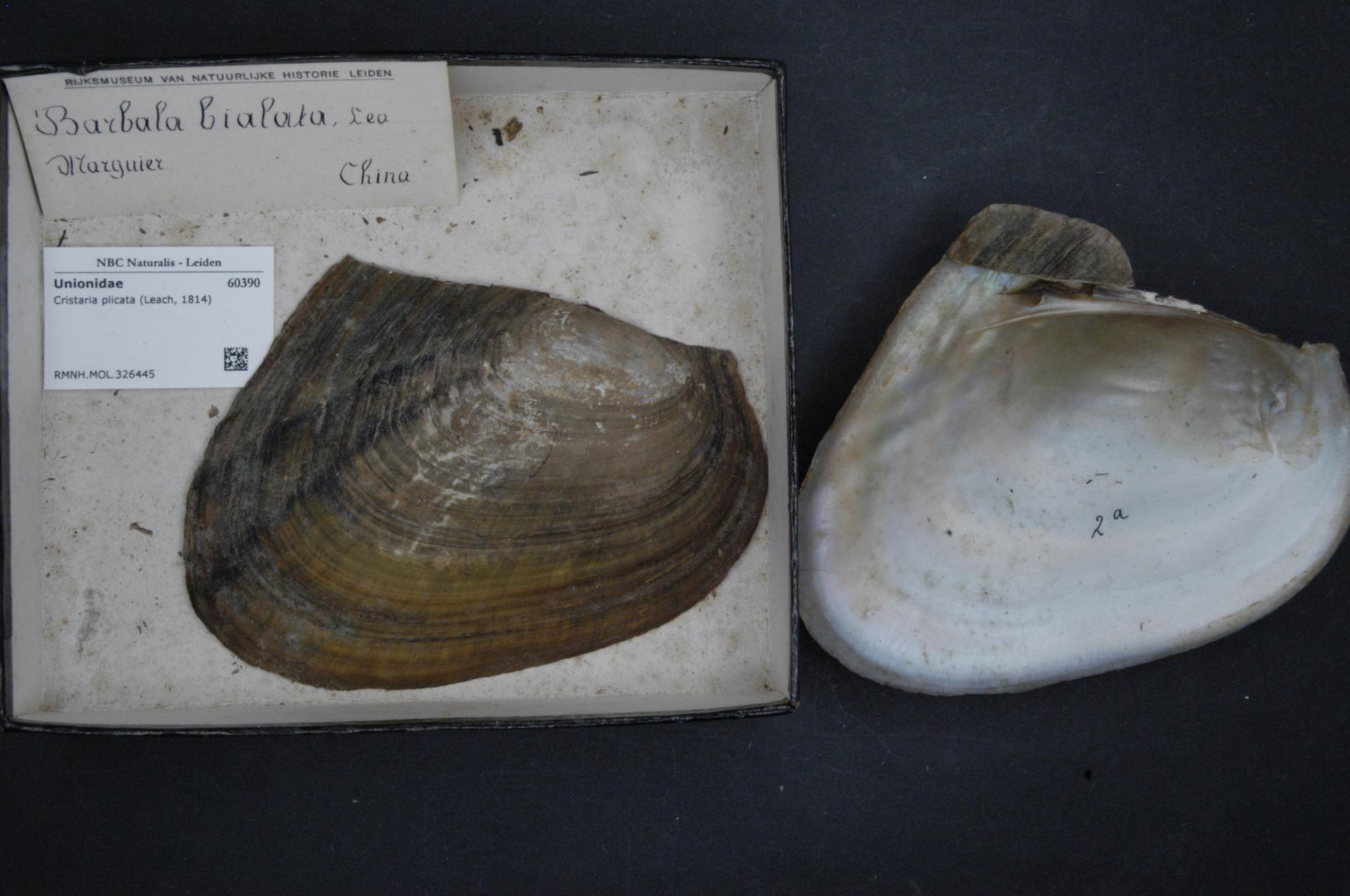

Conservation status
- Least Concern (IUCN 3.1)

Scientific classification
- Kingdom: Animalia
- Phylum: Mollusca
- Class: Bivalvia
- Order: Unionida
- Family: Unionidae
- Genus: Cristaria
- Species: C. plicata

Binomial name
- Cristaria plicata Leach, 1815

= Cristaria plicata =

Species of mollusc

Cristaria plicata, the cockscomb pearl mussel, is a freshwater mussel, an aquatic bivalve mollusk in the family Unionidae.

== Distribution ==
This species is native to northeast Asia and now also present in parts of southeast Asia. This large mussel is listed as endangered in South Korea.

== Biology ==
The mitochondrial genome of this species was sequenced in 2011 or 2012.

== Human uses ==
In China, this species is significant as "one of the most important freshwater mussels for pearl production in the country." It is used for medicinal purposes.
