= Nonsan =

City in South Chungcheong Province, South Korea

- Municipal City
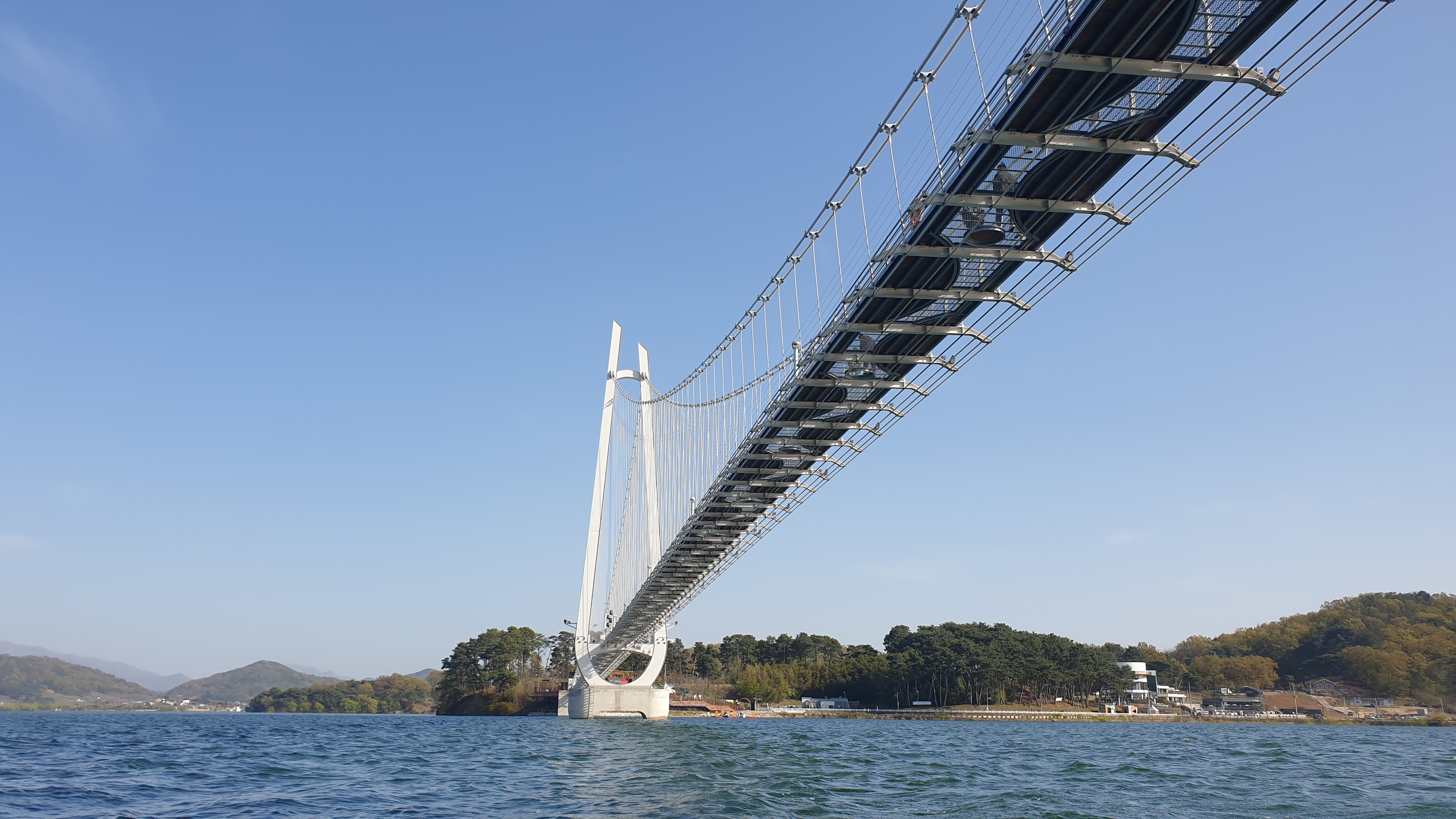
- Panoramic view of Nonsan Tabjeong bridge in Nonsan

- Flag Emblem
- Nickname: City of Strawberrys
- Location in South Korea
- Coordinates: 36°12′N 127°5′E
- Country: South Korea
- Region: Hoseo
- Administrative divisions: 2 eup, 11 myeon, and 2 dong

Government
  - Mayor: Baek Seong-hyeon (백성현)

Area
  - Total: 554.82 km^{2} (214.22 sq mi)

Population (September 2024)
  - Total: 108,883
  - Density: 220/km^{2} (570/sq mi)
  - Dialect: Chungcheong
- Time zone: UTC+9 (Korea Standard Time)

Korean name
- Hangul: 논산시
- Hanja: 論山市
- RR: Nonsan-si
- MR: Nonsan-si

Nonsan (Korean: 논산; Korean pronunciation: [non.san]) is a city in South Chungcheong Province, South Korea. It is located at 36°12′N 127°5′E. The origin of Nonsan's geographical names is said to have come from the small garden "Nolmoe," which rises in the middle of farming fields, where rice paddies and mountain are said to reflect geographical features. The city belongs to the Daejeon Metropolitan Area.

== History ==
Nonsan has a significant history. During the Samhan period, Nonsan is believed to have been part of Mahan territory. In the Baekje period, the district belonged to Hwangdeungyasan-gun. The crucial battle in which Silla defeated Baekje is thought to have taken place in the general area of Nonsan. Later, in the Silla period, Nonsan was divided into two different towns: Deogeun and Hwangsan.

The train station was built in 1911, in the same year as the rail line through the Nonsan plain was completed.

The modern city of Nonsan was established in 1914, by the merger of the four counties of Yeonsan-gun, Eunjin-gun, Noseong-gun and Seoksung-gun.

During the Korean War, a POW camp was set up by the U.S. and South Korean forces. On June 18, 1953, at the Nonsan camp as well as at POW camps at Busan, Masan, and Kwangju, thousands of POWs swarmed out of the camps and melted into the local population in order to avoid being repatriated to North Korea.

== Transportation ==
Nonsan is served by the national railroad system and city, regional and national bus lines. An expressway connects the city to Daejeon and other cities. Many streets have bike paths, sharing pavement with sidewalks. The stream running through the city proper is not navigable, but downstream it joins the Geum River, and an outlying subdivision of the city serves as a significant fishing port.

Chungcheong Metropolitan Railroad is proposed, in the third phase, to set Ganggyeong Station for the starting point and connect the city with Gyeryong, Daejeon, and Cheongju.

== Economics and industry ==
Nonsan is an agricultural city, with rice being the most important crop. Other important crops include strawberries, ginseng, napa cabbage, watermelons, and Korean pears. According to The Chosun Ilbo, the farmers are growing new varieties of strawberry produced in Japan without the producer's permission, while the JoongAng Daily says "Strawberries grown in Nonsan are of various types: seolhyang, maehyang, geumhyang, janghi (akihime) and yukbo (red pearl). The first three were developed in Nonsan while the latter two are from Japan. Janghi is the most commonly grown in Korea. However, seolhyang is the sweetest". Sesil [pronounced "say -shill"] company is the world's third leading producer of insects for natural pest control. The prominent yogurt company, Yakult, has its headquarters in Nonsan. Agro-Fisheries Trade Corp. is a regional supplier of food products.

The greater Nonsan area includes the ROK Army training center (36.125483°N 127.106697°E).

== Education ==
=== Higher education ===
- Konyang University, founded 1991, has its main campus in Nonsan. It has a university hospital with educational programs for medical technicians, nurses and doctors in Daejeon
- Geumgang University, founded 2004, is a Buddhist university in rural Nonsan, near Gyeryongsan.
- Korea Bio Polytechnic is a two-year college run by the Department of Labor.
- Korea National Defense University moved its campus from Seoul to Nonsan in 2017.

=== Secondary education ===
Nonsan has a number of high schools, including a girls' high school, a technical high school, and two private schools which attract students from across the province and beyond.

== Tourism ==
Local attractions include the Eunjin Mireuk, a large standing Buddhist sculpture of the Goryeo period and its accompanying temple, Gwanchoksa, as well as the Baekje Military Museum.

Mireuk-bosal at Gwanchok Temple in Nonsan, South Korea.

The spring Strawberry Festival is a popular tourist event as is the Ganggyoung autumn fermented seafood festival.

The eight famous spots in Nonsan include Gwanchoksa, the historic sites of General Gyebaek, Tapjeong Reservoir, Ssanggyesa (Temple), and Noseong Sanseong (Fortress).

== Other ==
The city has a concert hall, where various cultural activities such as concerts and lectures are held. Konyang University's auditorium also hosts free cultural activities for the community.

In June 2011, the multipurpose culture hall Sangsang Madang was completed. It is dedicated to "indie art".

Donam Academy, one of the nine neo-Confucian seowon established in Korea during the Choseon dynasty, is in greater Nonsan. It was made a UNESCO provisional world heritage site in December 2011.

Nonsan is the most famous area in Korea for its strawberries. Nonsan accounts for about 13% of Korea's strawberry production.

== Administrative divisions ==
Nonsan has jurisdiction over 2 eup, 11 myeon, and 2 dong.

Name	Hangul	Hanja
Ganggyeong-eup	강경읍	江景邑
Yeonmu-eup	연무읍	鍊武邑
Seongdong-myeon	성동면	城東面
Gwangseok-myeon	광석면	光石面
Noseong-myeon	노성면	魯城面
Sangwol-myeon	상월면	上月面
Bujeok-myeon	부적면	夫赤面
Yeonsan-myeon	연산면	連山面
Beolgok-myeon	벌곡면	伐谷面
Yangcheon-myeon	양촌면	陽村面
Gayagok-myeon	가야곡면	可也谷面
Eunjin-myeon	은진면	恩津面
Chae-un-myeon	채운면	彩雲面
Chwiam-dong	취암동	鷲岩洞
Buchang-dong	부창동	富倉洞

== Twin towns – sister cities ==
Nonsan is twinned with:

- (South Korea) Seocho District, Seoul
- (South Korea) Gangdong District, Seoul
- (South Korea) Jung District, Daejeon
- (South Korea) Jecheon, North Chungcheong Province
- (South Korea) Yangpyeong, Gyeonggi Province
- (South Korea) Mungyeong, North Gyeongsang Province
- Jining, China
- Jinzhou, China
- Langfang, China
- Gotemba, Japan
- Habikino, Japan

== Notable people ==
- Lazarus You Heung-sik, Cardinal of the Roman Catholic Church
- Lee In-je, three-time South Korean presidential candidate
- Chun Sung-gwan, Head of the Seoul Central District Prosecutor's Office (2009)
- Yeom Hong-chul, formal Mayor of Daejeon
- Go Soo, film and television actor
- Park Beom-shin, writer

== See also ==
- List of cities in South Korea
- Geography of South Korea
- Nonsan station
