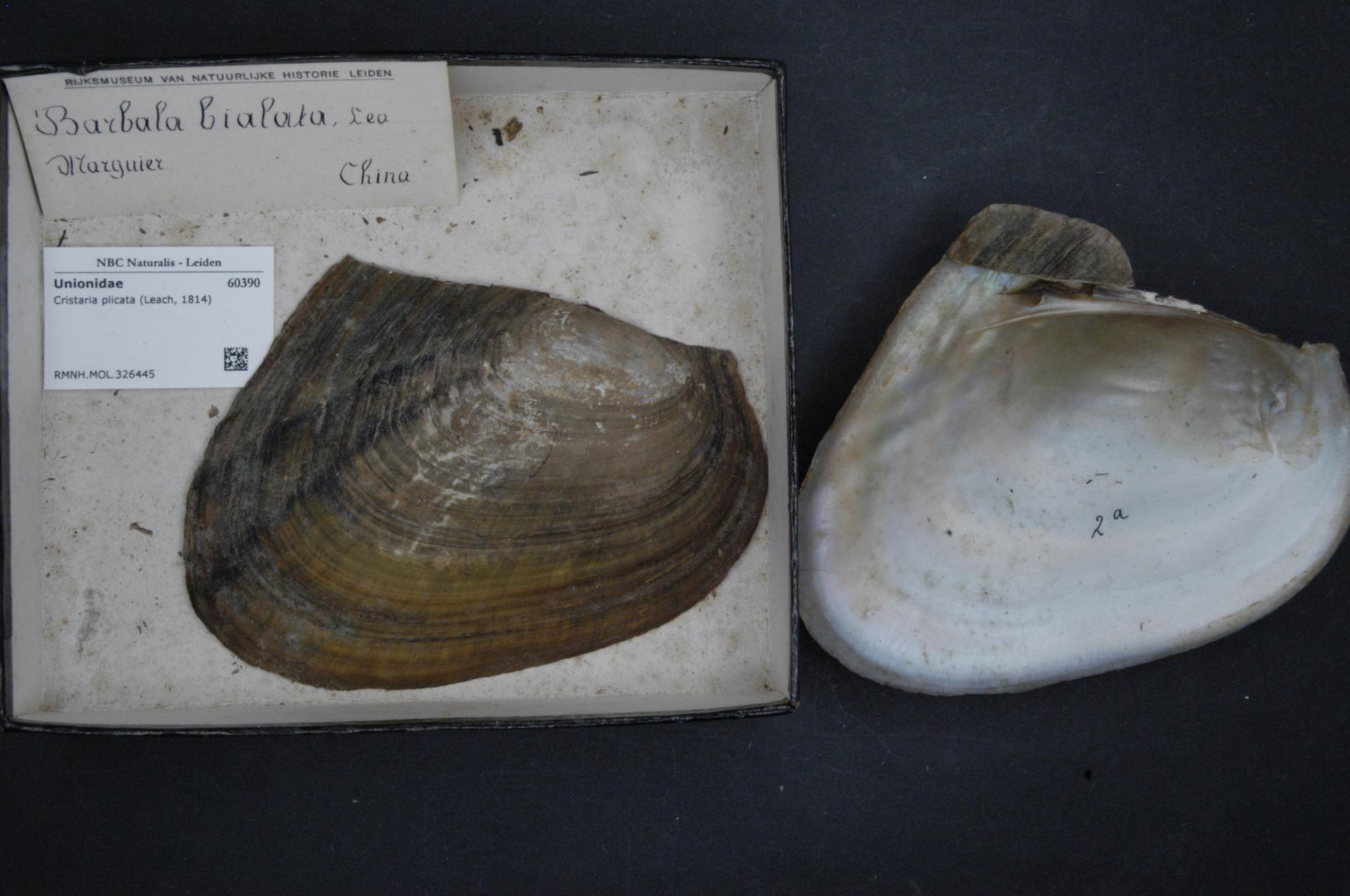
- Cristaria plicata

Scientific classification
- Kingdom: Animalia
- Phylum: Mollusca
- Class: Bivalvia
- Order: Unionida
- Family: Unionidae
- Tribe: Cristariini
- Genus: Cristaria; Schumacher, 1817

= Cristaria (bivalve) =

Genus of bivalves

Cristaria is a genus of freshwater mussels or pearl mussels, aquatic bivalve mollusks in the family Unionidae.

== Species ==
Species in the genus Cristaria include:

- Cristaria beirensis
- Cristaria plicata
- Cristaria radiata
- Cristaria tenuis
- Cristaria truncata
- Cristaria wangyucheniDai et al., 2026

== Human relevance ==
In China, one of the species in this genus, Cristaria plicata is "one of the most important freshwater mussels for pearl production" in the country. It is also used for medicinal purposes.
