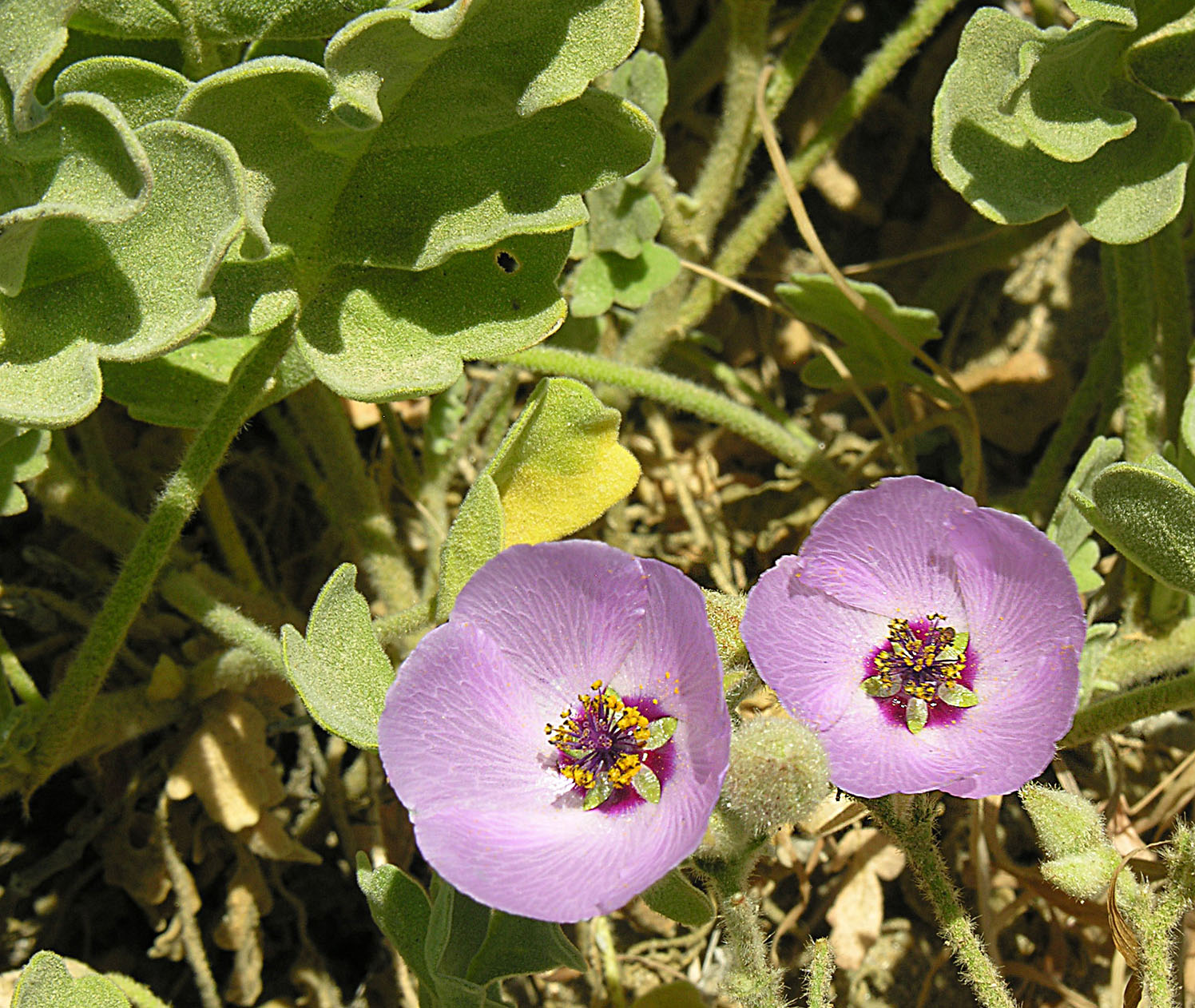
- Cristaria aspera

Scientific classification
- Kingdom: Plantae
- Clade: Tracheophytes
- Clade: Angiosperms
- Clade: Eudicots
- Clade: Rosids
- Order: Malvales
- Family: Malvaceae
- Tribe: Malveae
- Genus: Cristaria; Cav.

Species
- See text

= Cristaria (plant) =

Genus of flowering plants

Cristaria is a genus of flowering plants in the family Malvaceae. It contains 20 species native to South America, ranging from Peru to northern and central Chile, western Argentina, and the Desventuradas Islands.

== Species ==
20 species are accepted.

- Cristaria adenophora I.M.Johnst.
- Cristaria andicola Gay
- Cristaria argyliifolia Phil.
- Cristaria aspera Gay
- Cristaria calderana Muñoz-Schick
- Cristaria cordatorotundifolia Gay
- Cristaria cyanea Phil. ex Baker f.
- Cristaria dissecta Hook. & Arn.
- Cristaria fuentesiana I.M.Johnst.
- Cristaria glaucophylla Cav.
- Cristaria gracilis Gay
- Cristaria insularis Phil.
- Cristaria integerrima Phil.
- Cristaria leucantha I.M.Johnst.
- Cristaria molinae Gay
- Cristaria multifida (Dombey ex Cav.) Cav.
- Cristaria multiflora Gay (synonym Cristaria elegans Gay)
- Cristaria ovata Muñoz-Schick
- Cristaria tenuissima Muñoz-Schick
- Cristaria viridiluteola Gay
