= Gosan Seowon, Andong =

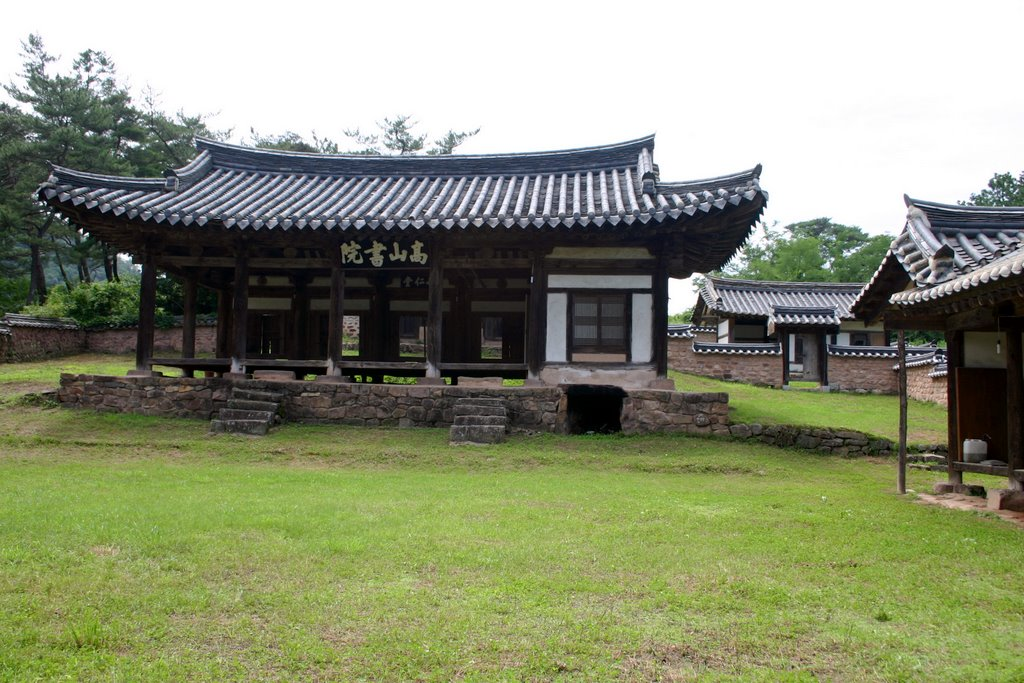
- A view of the Gosan Seowon

Korean name
- Hangul: 고산서원
- Hanja: 高山書院
- RR: Gosan seowon
- MR: Kosan sŏwŏn

The Gosan Seowon is a seowon located in the village of Gwangeum-ri, Namhu-myeon of Andong, North Gyeongsang Province, South Korea. Seowon were private Confucian academies which educated the officials of the Joseon Dynasty (1392–1897) and contained shrines for notable (local) Joseon scholars. It was first established by local Confucian scholars in 1789, the 13th year of King Jeongjo's reign, to commemorate the scholarly achievement and virtue of the Confucian scholar Yi Sang-jeong (李象靖 1711-1781).

== See also ==
- Dosan Seowon
- Byeongsan Seowon
- Imcheon Seowon
- Korean Confucianism
- List of seowon
