= Mukgye Seowon =

Seowon in South Korea

Coordinates: 36.415812°N 128.917699°E

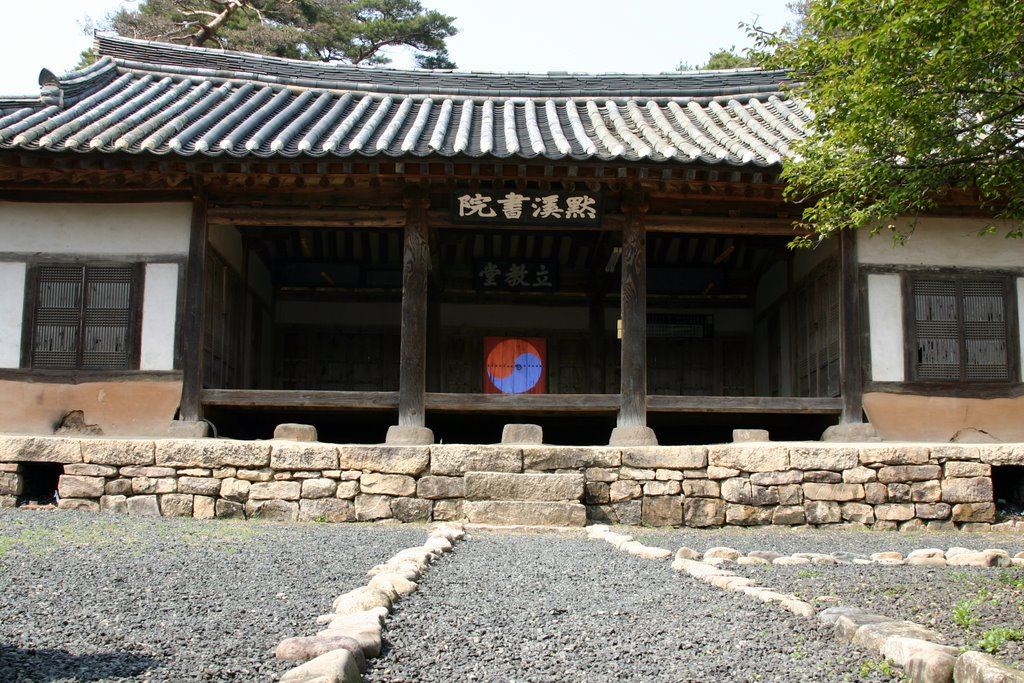

Korean name
- Hangul: 묵계서원
- Hanja: 默溪書院
- RR: Mukgye seowon
- MR: Mukkye sŏwŏn

Mukgye Seowon is a seowon located at Mukgye-ri, Giran-myeon of the Andong City, North Gyeongsang Province, South Korea. Seowon is a type of local academy during the Joseon Dynasty (1392–1897). It was established by the local Confucian scholars in 1706, the 32nd year of King Sukjong's reign to commemorate the scholarly achievement and good dead of Kim Gye-haeng (金係行 1431–1517) and Ok Go (玉沽 1382–1436) both of which were civil ministers.

The structure was in danger of burning down during the March 2025 South Korea wildfires. Nearby residents reported that the pavilion had completely burned down but when Andong City officials visited the site the next day, they confirmed that Mukgye Seowon was safe and in its original state.

== Gallery ==
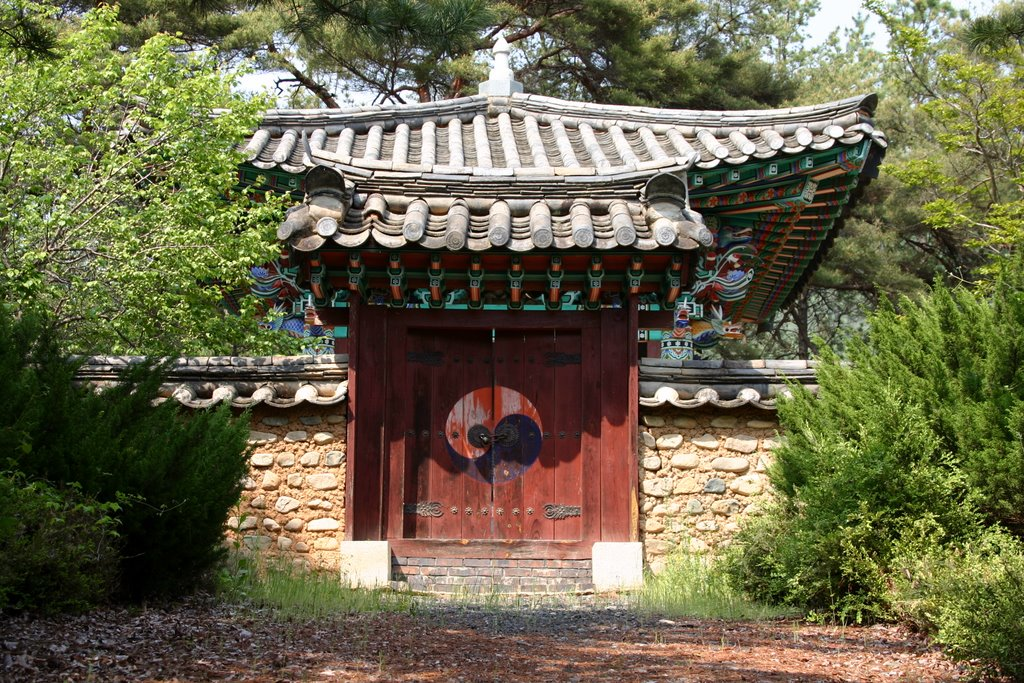

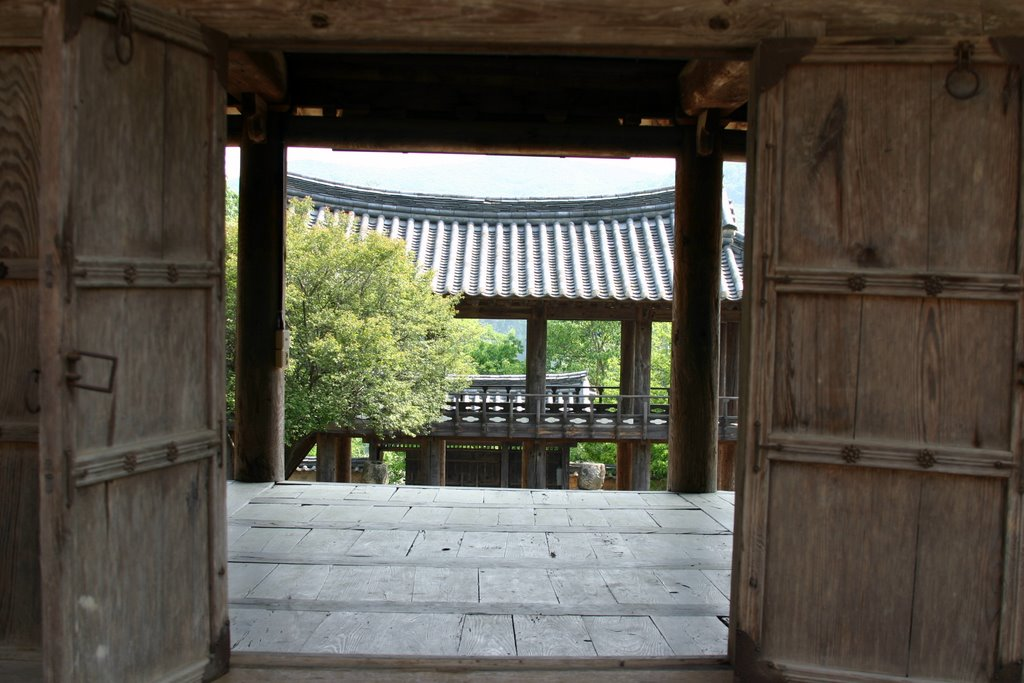

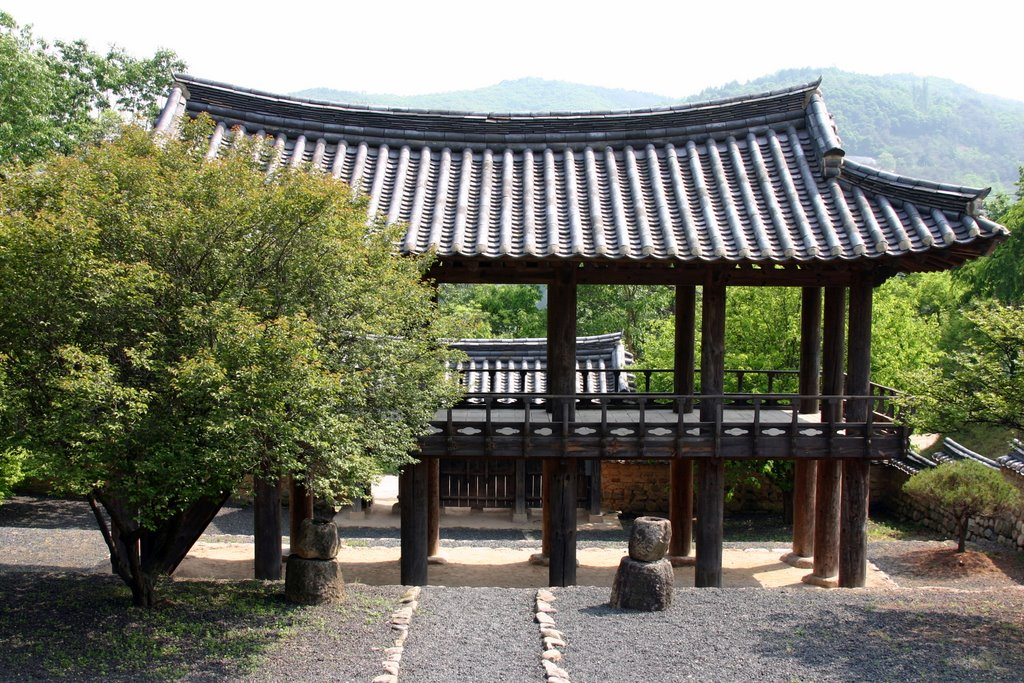

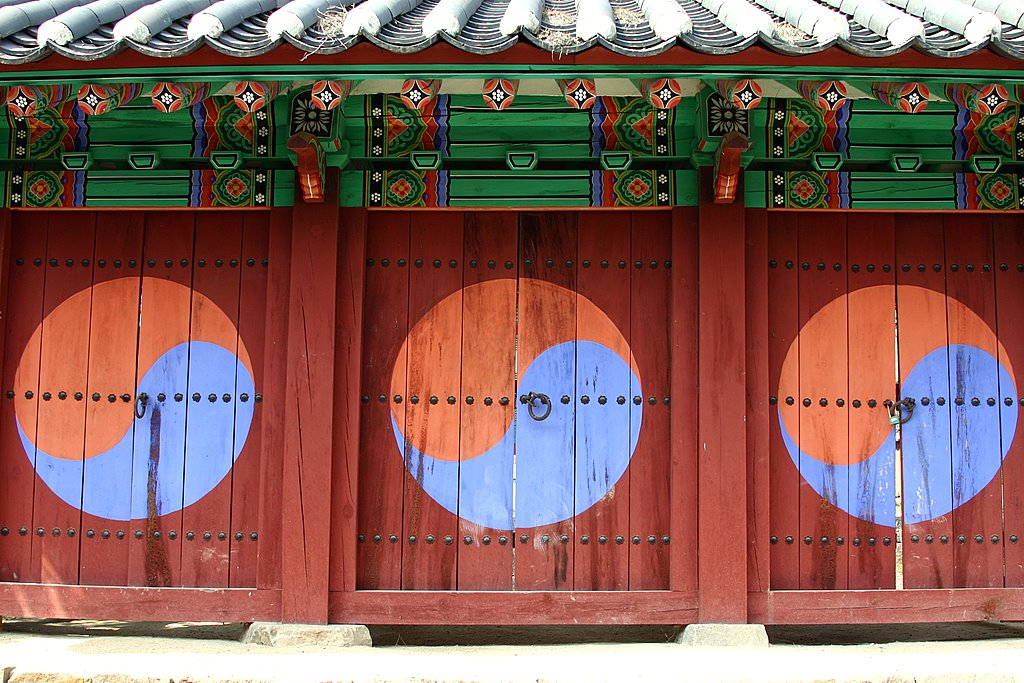

== See also ==
- Dosan Seowon
- Korean Confucianism
