= Mindori =

Style in Korean architecture

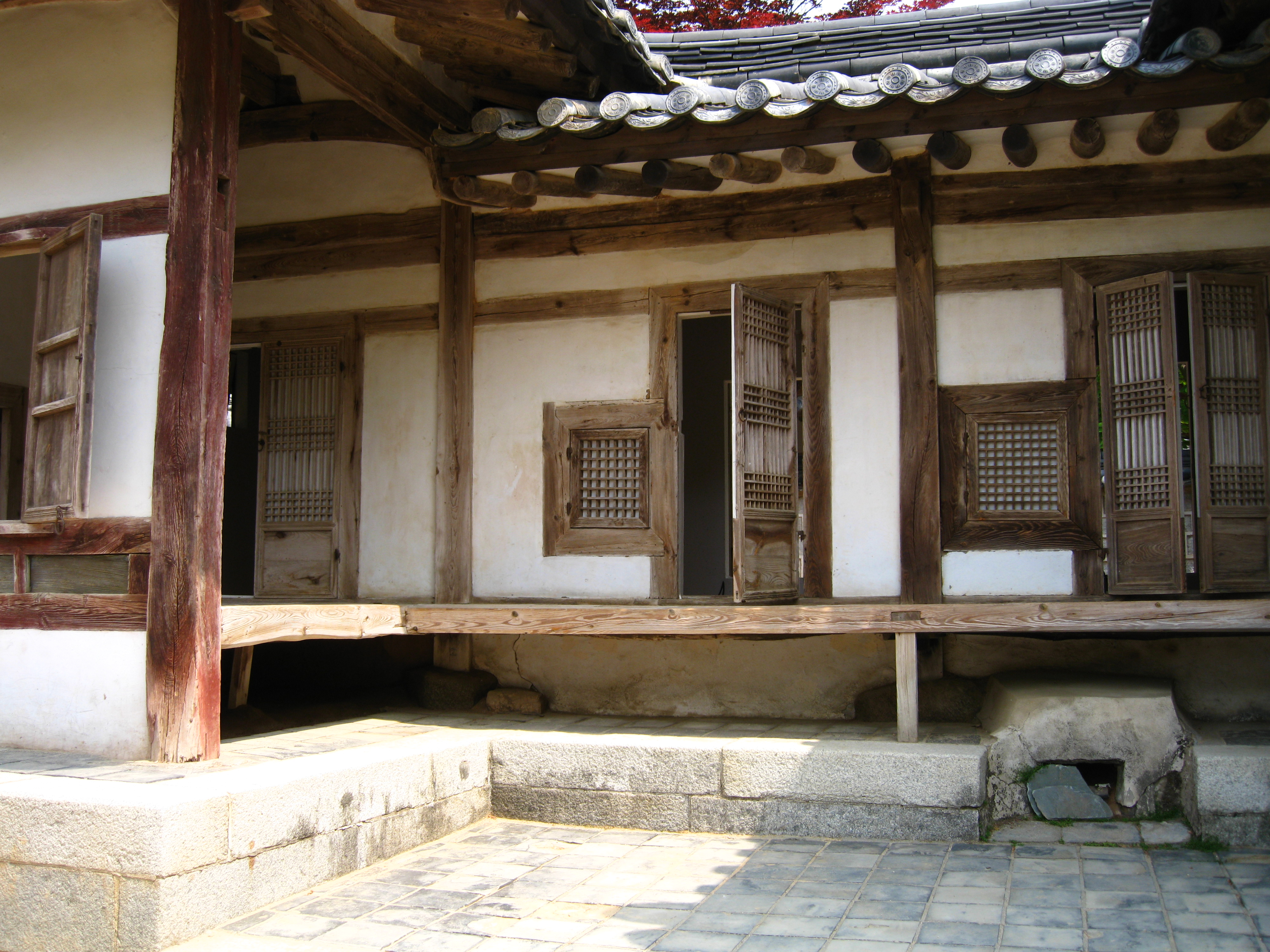
Dosan Seowon Nongunjeongsa

Mindori (Korean: 민도리) is a style in Korean architecture where in the columns of a building directly support the beams without using supporting materials such as capitals, salmi, cheomcha, and ikgong on the upper part of the columns.

== Overview ==
Korean wooden architecture is largely divided into the following types based on the configuration of the part that supports the beam at the top of the column: po, ikgong, and mindori.

Mindori is divided into guldori and napdori. Guldori has a more complex structure and are more formal than napdori, while napdori is mainly used in buildings of lower formality.

== Style ==
The structure does not use materials such as a capital, salmi, cheomcha, or ikgong, and the upper part of the column supports the beam. A separate window box is not used.

The building Nongunjeongsa (농운정사) in Dosan Seowon, designed by Yi Hwang, is a hip-and-gable roofed building in the mindori style with four bays in the front and three bays on the side.
