= List of seowon =

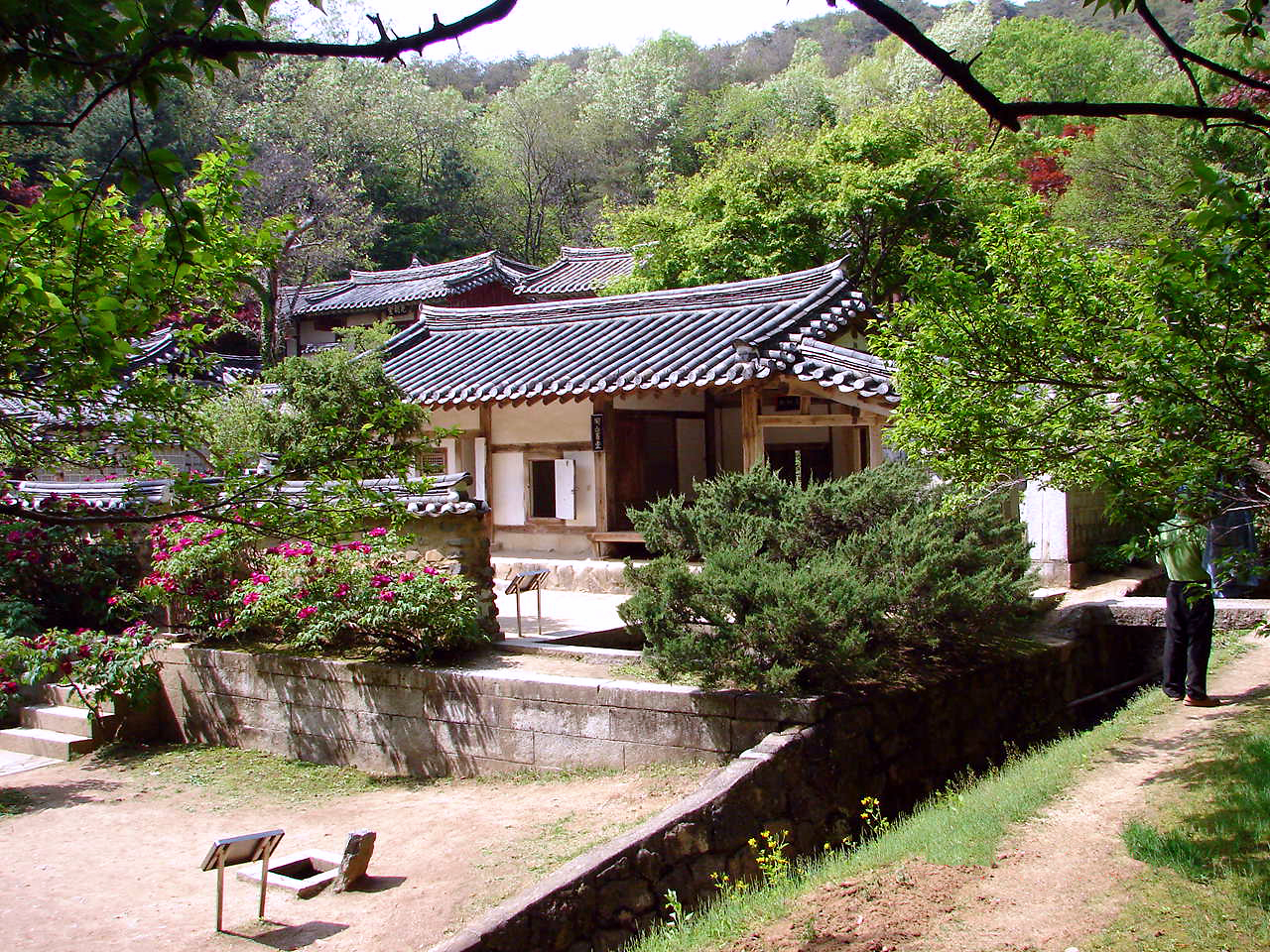
Dosan Seowon in Andong, South Korea

This is a list of seowon in both North and South Korea. The seowon were private Korean Confucian institutions which combined the roles of Confucian shrine and academy. For the closely related government educational institutions (hanggyo, 항교) see list of hanggyo.

The seowon here are listed according to the province in which they were located.

== Gyeonggi ==
Name	Hangul Hanja	Location	Chief enshrined sage	Founding	Closure	Notes
Chungnyeolsa	충렬사	Ganghwado, Incheon	Kim Sang-yong		Exempted in 1871	
Deokbong Seowon	덕봉서원	Yangseong-myeon, Anseong	O Du-in		Exempted in 1871	
Ganghansa	강한사	Yeoju	Song Si-yŏl		Exempted in 1871	
Gigongsa	기공사	Goyang	Kwŏn Yul		Exempted in 1871	
Hyeonjeolsa	현절사	Gwangju	Kim Sang-heon		Exempted in 1871	
Nogang Seowon	노강서원	Gwacheon	Pak Tae-bo		Exempted in 1871	
Pasan Seowon	파산서원	Paju	Sŏng Hon		Exempted in 1871	
Sachung Seowon	사충서원	Gwacheon	Kim Chang-jip		Exempted in 1871	
Simgok Seowon	심곡서원	Yongin	Cho Kwangjo		Exempted in 1871	
Sungyang Seowon	숭양서원	Kaesong	Chŏng Mong-ju		Exempted in 1871	
Ujeo Seowon	우저서원	Gimpo	Cho Hŏn		Exempted in 1871	
Yongyeon Seowon	용연서원	Pocheon	Yi Deok-hyeong		Exempted in 1871	

== Chungcheong ==
Name	Hangul Hanja	Location	Chief enshrined sage	Founding	Closure	Notes
Changnyeolsa	창렬사	Hongsan-myeon, Buyeo	Yun Jip		Exempted in 1871.	
Chungnyeolsa	충렬사	Chungju	Im Gyeong-eop		Exempted in 1871.	
Dunam Seowon	둔암서원	Yeonsan-myeon, Nonsan	Kim Gang-saeng		Exempted in 1871.	
Nogang Seowon	노강서원	Noseong-myeon, Nonsan	Yun Hwang		Exempted in 1871.	
Pyochungsa	표충사	Cheongju	Yi Bong-sang		Exempted in 1871.	

== Jeolla ==
Name	Hangul Hanja	Location	Chief enshrined sage	Founding	Closure	Notes
Gyullim Seowon	귤림서원	Jeju City	Kim Jeong	1665	1871 by royal decree	Founded by Choe Jin-nam
Jocheon Seowon	조천서원	Jeju City	Gang Ji-yeon		1871 by royal decree	
Museong Seowon	무성서원 武城書院	Taein-myeon, Jeongeup	Ch'oe Ch'i-wŏn		Exempted in 1871	
Piram Seowon	필암서원 茟巖書院	Jangseong	Kim In-hu		Exempted in 1871	
Pochungsa	포충사 褒忠祠	Gwangju	Ko Kyŏngmyŏng		Exempted in 1871	

== Gyeongsang ==
=== North Gyeongsang ===
Name	Hangul Hanja	Location	Chief enshrined sage	Founding	Closure	Notes
Byeongsan Seowon	병산서원 屛山書院	Byeongsan-ri, Pungcheon-myeon, Andong	Yu Sŏngnyong	1620	Exempted in 1871	
Changnyeolsa	충렬사	Jinju	Kim Ch'ŏnil		Exempted in 1871	
Chungnyeolsa	충렬사	Goseong	Yi Sun-sin		Exempted in 1871	
Chungnyeolsa	충렬사	Dongnae-gu, Busan	Song Sang-hyeon		Exempted in 1871	
Dobong Seowon	도봉서원	Hyeonpung-myeon, Dalseong-gun, Daegu	Kim Goeng-pil		Exempted in 1871	
Dongnak Seowon	동락서원	Jinmi-dong (373 Imsu-dong) Gumi				
Dosan Seowon	도산서원 陶山書院	Yean-myeon, Andong	Yi Hwang		Exempted in 1871	Depicted on the reverse of the South Korean 1,000 won bill from 1975 to 2007
Geumo Seowon	금오서원	Seonsan-eup, Gumi	Kil Chae		Exempted in 1871	
Heungam Seowon	흥암서원	Sangju	Song Chun-gil		Exempted in 1871	
Huiyeon Seowon	희연서원	258, Sinjeong-ri, Suryun-myen, Seongju County				
Imgo Seowon	임고서원	462-21, Yanghang-ri, Imgo-myeon, Yeongcheon	1553 (명종 8)			
Jagye Seowon	자계서원	Seowon-ri, Iseo-myeon, Cheongdo County		1518		
Namgye Seowon	남계서원	Hamyang	Jeong Yeo-chang		Exempted in 1871	
Okdong Seowon	옥동서원	546, Subong-ri, Modong-myeon, Sangju	Hwang Hui	1518년(중종 13)	Exempted in 1871	
Oksan Seowon	옥산서원	Gyeongju	Yi Ŏnjŏk		Exempted in 1871	
Pochungsa	포충사	Geochang	Yi Sul-won		Exempted in 1871	
Pyochung Seowon	표충서원	Miryang	Songun Yu Jeong			The only seowon inside a Buddhist temple.
Samgye Seowon	삼계서원	Samgye-ri, Bonghwa-eup, Bonghwa County				
Seoak Seowon	서악서원	Gyeongju	Seol Chong		Exempted in 1871	
Sincheon Seowon	신천서원	421-2, Wangsin-ri, Yeocheon-eup, Yecheon County		1624	<!closer-->	
Sosu Seowon	소수서원 紹修書院	Sunheung-myeon, Yeongju	An Hyang		Exempted in 1871	Considered the first seowon.
Yerim Seowon	예림서원 禮林書院	Miryang	Kim Chong-jik		1871 by royal decree.	
Yonggye Seowon	용계서원	303 Yongsan-ri, Jayang-myeon, Yeongcheon		1684 (숙종 10)		

== Gangwon ==
Name	Hangul Hanja	Location	Chief enshrined sage	Founding	Closure	Notes
Changjeol Seowon	창절서원	Yeongwol	Pak P'aengnyŏn		Exempted in 1871	
Chungnyeol Seowon	충렬서원	Kimhwa	Hong Myeong-gu		Exempted in 1871	
Pochungsa	포충사	Cheorwon	Kim Eung-ha		Exempted in 1871	

== Hwanghae ==
Name	Hangul Hanja	Location	Chief enshrined sage	Founding	Closure	Notes
Bongyang Seowon	보양서원	Changyŏn	Pak Se-chae		Exempted in 1871.	
Cheongseongmyo	청성묘	Haeju	Bo Yi (伯夷)		Exempted in 1871.	Dedicated to a Chinese sage.
Munhoe Seowon	문회서원	Paech'ŏn	Yi I		Exempted in 1871.	
Taesasa	태사사	P'yŏngsan	Sin Sung-gyŏm		Exempted in 1871.	

== Hamgyeong ==
Name	Hangul Hanja	Location	Chief enshrined sage	Founding	Closure	Notes
Nodeok Seowon		Pukch'ŏng	Yi Hang-bok		Exempted in 1871.	

== Pyeongan ==
Name	Hangul Hanja	Location	Chief enshrined sage	Founding	Closure	Notes
Chungminsa	충민사 忠愍祠	Anju	Nam I-heung		Exempted in 1871.	
Muyeolsa	무열사 武烈祠	P'yŏngyang	Four including Shi Xing (石星), Li Rusong		Exempted in 1871, but closed later.	Dedicated to Chinese sages
Pyojeolsa	표절사 表節祠	Chŏngju	Jeong Si		Exempted in 1871	
Samchungsa	삼충사 三忠祠	P'yŏngwŏn	Zhuge Liang, Yue Fei, Wen Tianxiang		Exempted in 1871, but closed later.	Dedicated to Chinese sages.
Suchungsa	수충사 酬忠祠	Ryŏngbyŏn	Songun Yu Jeong, Hyu Jeong		Exempted in 1871, but closed later.	Dedicated to Buddhist monks.

== Ulsan ==
Name	Hangul Hanja	Location	Chief enshrined sage	Founding	Closure	Notes
Chisan Seowon	치산 서원 岐山誓言	Manhwa-ri, Dudong-myeon Ulju-gun, Ulsan Metropolitan City	Park Jae-sang		Exempted in 1871.	Park's wife Chisul-sinmo shrine is here, Chisan Seowon was built upon the site of the shrine during the Joseon Dynasty.

== See also ==
- Education in the Joseon Dynasty
- Korean Confucianism
- Seowon
- Gwageo
