= Pungsan =

Pungsan or Poongsan can refer to:

== Places ==
- Kimhyonggwon County, a county in Ryanggang Province, North Korea formerly known as "Pungsan"
- Pungsan-eup, a town in Andong, North Gyeongsang Province, South Korea

== Other ==
- Pungsan Sim clan in Korea
- Pungsan dog, a breed of hunting dog from North Korea
- Poongsan, a 2011 South Korean film
- Poongsan Corporation, a South Korean company
