= Imcheon Seowon =

Imcheon Seowon may refer to

- Imcheon Seowon, Andong in Gyeongsangbuk-do, South Korea
- Imcheon Seowon, Jinju in Gyeongsangnam-do, South Korea
