= Imcheon Seowon, Andong =

Seowon in Andong, North Gyeongsang, South Korea

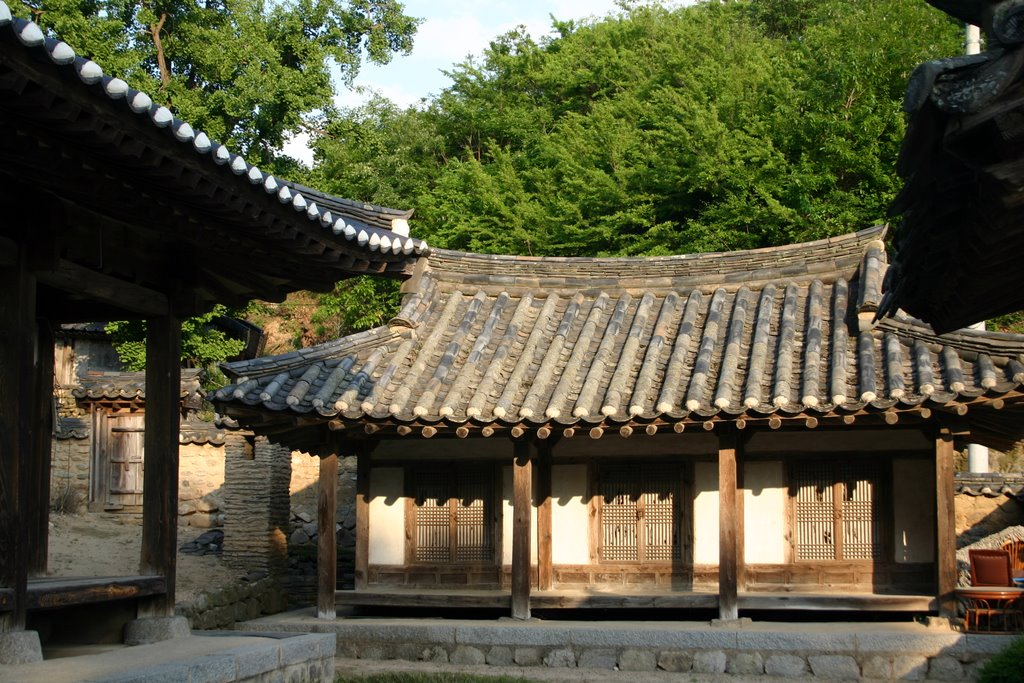
- A view of the Imcheon Seowon

Korean name
- Hangul: 임천서원
- Hanja: 臨川書院
- RR: Imcheon seowon
- MR: Imch'ŏn sŏwŏn

The Imcheon Seowon is a seowon located in the neighborhood of Songhyeon-dong of Andong, North Gyeongsang Province, South Korea. Seowon is a type of local academy during the Joseon Dynasty (1392–1897). It was first established by local Confucian scholars in 1607, the 40th year of King Seonjo's reign, to commemorate the scholarly achievement and virtue of the Confucian scholar and politician Kim Sŏngil (1538-1593).

== See also ==
- Dosan Seowon
- Byeongsan Seowon
- Korean Confucianism
