= Pungsan Sim clan =

Korean clan from North Gyeongsang Province

- Country: Korea
- Current region: Andong
- Founder: Sim Man seung
- Connected members: Shim Hyung-tak

Pungsan Sim clan (Korean: 풍산 심씨; Hanja: 豊山 沈氏) was one of the Korean clans. Their Bon-gwan was in Andong, North Gyeongsang Province. According to the research in 2015, the number of Pungsan Sim clan was 11187. Their founder was Sim Man seung who was from Zhejiang. He visited Goryeo for business in 1110 and was settled in Pungsan. He excelled at literature. He was appointed as Minister of Rites (Hanja: 尙書) because he won the Yejong of Goryeo’s favor. His descendant began Pungsan Sim clan and made Pungsan their Bon-gwan.

== See also ==
- Korean clan names of foreign origin
