= Catholic Sangji College =

Private college in Andong, South Korea

- Type: Private
- Established: 1970
- Affiliations: Roman Catholic
- President: Yu Gang-ha
- Location: Andong, North Gyeongsang, South Korea; 36.56944°N 128.73599°E
- Website: http://english.csj.ac.kr/

- Catholic Sangji College
- Hangul: 가톨릭 상지 대학
- Hanja: 가톨릭 上智大學
- Revised Romanization: Gatollik Sangji Daehak
- McCune–Reischauer: Kat'ollik Sangji Taehak

Catholic Sangji College is a private 2-year college affiliated with the South Korean Roman Catholic church. It is located in the city center of Andong City, North Gyeongsang province, South Korea. The president is Yu Gang-ha (유강하). As a technical junior college, Catholic Sangji College emphasizes team teaching and project-based learning.

== Academic departments ==
Division of Humanities:

- Early childhood education
- Social welfare
- Management
- Tax accounting
- Hotel tourism
- Police management
- Administration

Division of Health and Nursing

- Speech-language pathology
- Medical computing
- Traditional medicines
- Nursing

Division of Natural Science

- Hotel cuisine and nutrition

Division of Industry

- Computer information
- Information communications
- Railroad electricity
- Automotive technology
- Computer multimedia design
- Interior design

== History ==
The college began in 1970 as Sangji Technical School. It was founded by three Luxembourgian nuns of the order, Soeurs de la Doctrine Chrétienne (French, “Sisters of the Christian Doctrine”).

== Sister schools ==
Sangji Catholic College maintains ties with four American institutions: University of California Riverside, Georgia Southwestern University, and North Park University. In addition, sisterhood relations exist between the automotive departments of Sangji Catholic and Kennedy King Community College in Chicago.

== See also ==
- List of colleges and universities in South Korea
- Education in South Korea
