= Byeongsan Seowon =

UNESCO World Heritage Site in South Korea

Byeongsanseowon Confucian Academy
UNESCO World Heritage Site
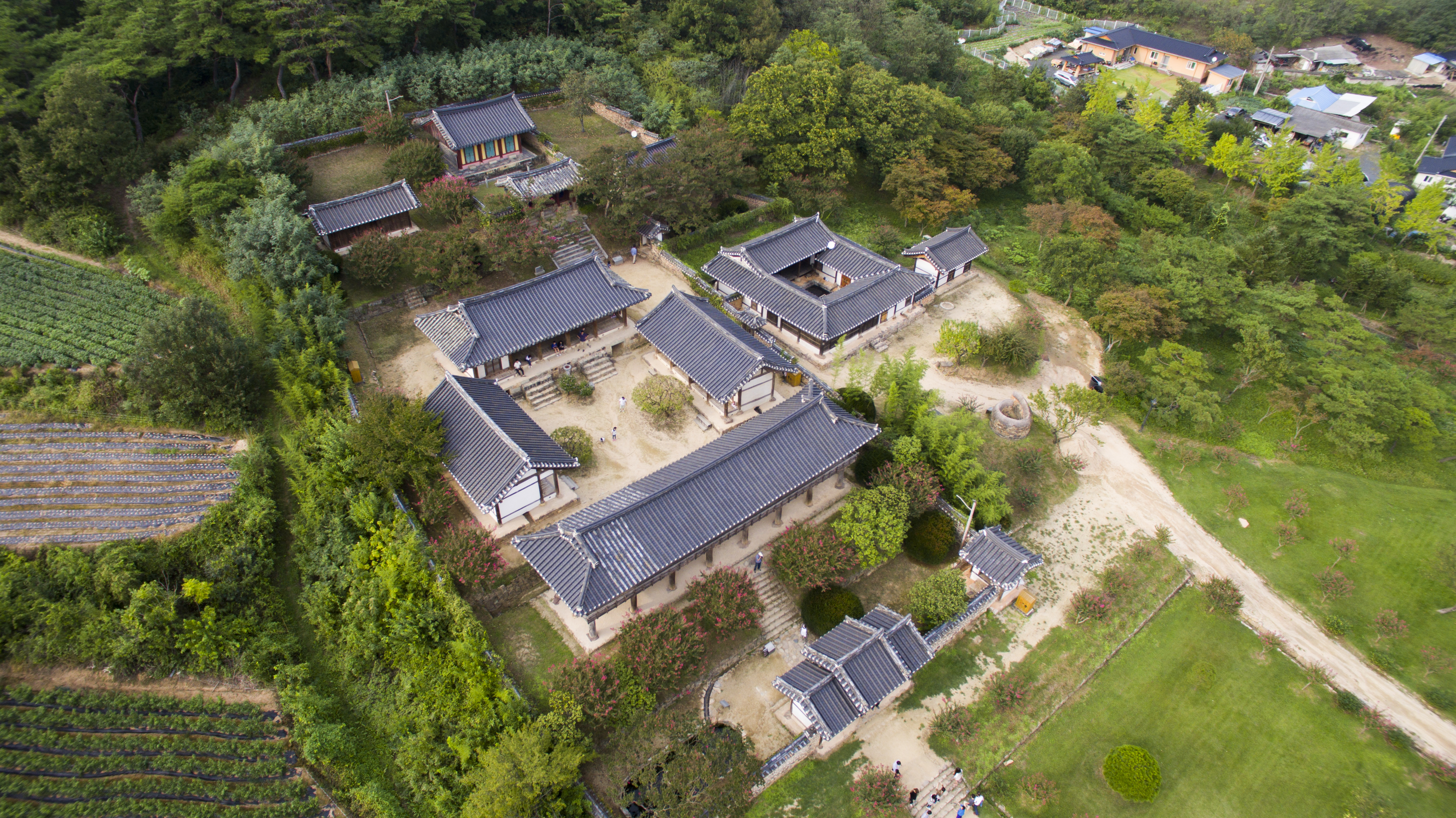

- Location within South Korea
- Location: Pungcheon-myeon, Andong, North Gyeongsang Province, South Korea
- Part of: Historic Villages of Korea: Hahoe and Yangdong
- Criteria: Cultural: (iii), (iv)
- Reference: 1324-002
- Inscription: 2010 (34th Session)
- Area: 1.7 ha (4.2 acres)
- Coordinates: 36°32′25″N 128°33′10″E

UNESCO World Heritage Site
- Official name: Byeongsan-seowon
- Part of: Seowon, Korean Neo-Confucian Academies
- Criteria: Cultural: (iii)
- Reference: 1498-007
- Inscription: 2019 (43rd Session)
- Area: 30.08 ha (74.3 acres)
- Buffer zone: 164.30 ha (406.0 acres)

Korean name
- Hangul: 병산서원
- Hanja: 屛山書院
- RR: Byeongsan seowon
- MR: Pyŏngsan sŏwŏn

The Byeongsan Seowon (Korean: 병산서원) is a seowon located in Byeongsa-ri village of the Pungcheon-myeon township in the city of Andong, North Gyeongsang Province, South Korea. Seowon is a type of local academy during the Joseon Dynasty (1392–1897). It was first established as Jondeoksa (尊德祠) by local Confucian scholars especially Jeong Gyeong-se (鄭經世) in 1613, the fifth year of King Gwanghaegung's reign, to commemorate the scholarly achievement and virtue of the notable Confucian scholar and politician Yu Sŏngnyong. The predecessor of the seowon was Pungak Seodang (豊岳書堂) which was a school located in Pungsan to teach the Pungsan Yu clan during the Goryeo period. Yu Sŏngnyong moved the seodang to the current place in 1572.

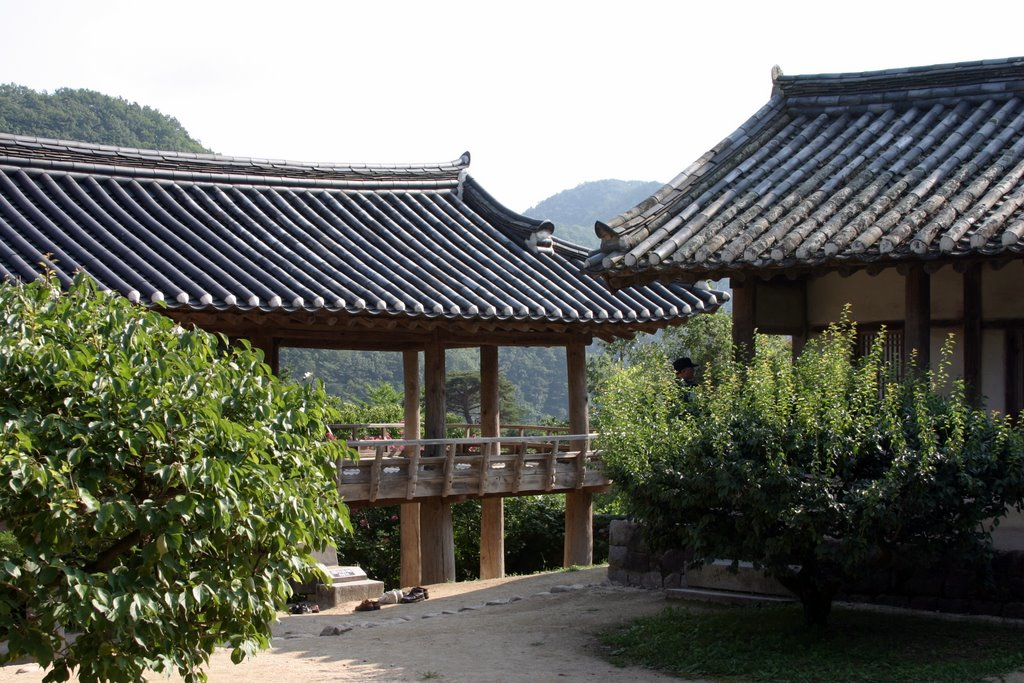
A view of Byeongsan Seowon

== History ==
The history of Byeongsan Seowon began when Yu Sŏngnyong moved to Andong in 1372 from Pungak Seodang, a Confucian school established during the Goryeo period. After Yu Sŏngnyong died in 1607, local Confucianists such as Jeong Gyeong-se founded Jondeok Temple in 1613 and enshrined an ancestral tablet to commemorate his academic work and virtues. The temple was renamed Byeongsan Seowon in 1614.

In 1620, following a public discussion among Confucianists, the ancestral tablet was moved to Yeogang Seowon, a memorial Seowon for Toegye. In 1629 new ancestral tablets to worship Yu Sŏngnyong and his third son Yu Chin were made.

Byeongsan Seowon served as a branch of local education to produce many scholars. In 1868, Heungseon Daewongun ordered to remove it, but it was not damaged. The auditorium was rebuilt in 1921 under Japanese rule. Hyangsarye, a memorial ceremony for Yu Sŏngnyong and Yu Chin, is held here every March and September.

It is designated as Historic Site No. 260 and contains about 3,000 books of about 1,000 different types, including a collection of books by Yu Sŏngnyong. The complex was also included in the UNESCO World Heritage List in 2019.

In 2025, the Korean Broadcasting System apologized after its staff hammered five nails into the complex's Mandaeru Pavilion to hang lanterns as part of shooting the drama The First Night with the Duke.

== See also ==
- Dosan Seowon
- Korean Confucianism
