= List of hyanggyo =

List of Korean government Confucian schools

Hyanggyo were Confucian schools built by the governments of Goryeo, Joseon, and the Korean Empire to educate and train officials in Confucian ideals and the ethics of government.

== List ==
| Article | inception | coordinate location | image |
|---|---|---|---|
| Asan Hyanggyo | | 36.8495°N 126.9463°E | |
| Bianhyanggyo | | 36.37025°N 128.472°E | |
| Biinhyanggyo | 1398 | 36.1403583°N 126.60782°E | |
| Bonghwahyanggyo | | 36.88839°N 128.81572°E | |
| Boryeong Hyanggyo | 1723 | 36.4114361°N 126.592375°E | |
| Boseonghyanggyo | 1397 | 34.76861°N 127.07861°E | |
| Buyeo Hyanggyo | | 36.28041°N 126.9144805°E | |
| Changpyeonghyanggyo | | 35.216694°N 126.9843°E | |
| Cheonan Hyanggyo | 1398 | 36.8175°N 127.17194°E | |
| Cheongdohyanggyo | 1568 | 35.64683°N 128.708639°E | |
| Cheonghahyanggyo | 1398 | 36.20025°N 129.3385°E | |
| Cheongjuhyanggyo | | 36.637161°N 127.4890805°E | |
| Cheongpunghyanggyo | | 37.00028°N 128.1661°E | |
| Cheongsong Hyanggyo | 1426 | 36.43472°N 129.0575°E | |
| Cheongyang Hyanggyo | | 36.455°N 126.81528°E | |
| Cheorwonhyanggyoji | | 38.23917°N 127.214°E | |
| Chuncheonhyanggyo | | | |
| Chungju Hyanggyo | 1398 | 36.974625°N 127.93783°E | |
| Daeheunghyanggyo | 1405 | 36.6161°N 126.78694°E | |
| Daejeonghyanggyo | 1420 | 33.2394°N 126.2883°E | |
| Dangjin Hyanggyo | 1407 | 36.8925°N 126.63305°E | |
| Deoksan Hyanggyo | | 36.70004°N 126.6549528°E | |
| Dolsanhyanggyo | | 34.617305°N 127.72761°E | |
| Dongbokhyanggyo | 1445 | 35.077°N 127.1139°E | |
| Eonyanghyanggyo | | 35.557°N 129.1139°E | |
| Eunjinhyanggyo | 1380 | 36.17099°N 127.1114861°E | |
| Gangjinhyanggyo | 1398 | 34.650028°N 126.76961°E | |
| Gangneunghyanggyo | 1313 | 37.7634°N 128.8945694°E | |
| Ganseonghyanggyo | 1420 | 38.3783°N 128.439°E | |
| Gapyeonghyanggyo | 1398 | 37.83°N 127.5075°E | |
| Geumsanhyanggyo | | 36.11083°N 127.48972°E | |
| Gijang Hyanggyo | 1440 | 35.258°N 129.2125°E | |
| Gimcheon Gimsan Hyanggyo | 1392 | 36.1394°N 128.096861°E | |
| Gimje-gun Government Office and Hyanggyo | 1404 | 35.800805°N 126.88194°E | |
| Goesan Cheonganhyanggyo | | | |
| Gokseonghyanggyo | 1570 | 35.28472°N 127.28194°E | |
| Gongjuhyanggyo | | 36.4583°N 127.11639°E | |
| Goryeonghyanggyo | | 35.72917°N 128.26528°E | |
| Goyanghyanggyo | | 37.7039°N 126.895°E | |
| Gumi Seonsanhyanggyo | 1450 | 36.252472°N 128.30061°E | |
| Gunwihyanggyo | 1470 | 36.2343°N 128.56839°E | |
| Guryehyanggyo | | 35.201°N 127.45417°E | |
| Gwangju Hyanggyo | | 37.5183°N 127.22305°E | |
| Gwangju Hyanggyo | | 35.1461°N 126.90361°E | |
| Gwangyang Hyanggyo | 1443 | 34.9825°N 127.5875°E | |
| Gyeolseonghyanggyo | | 36.5288083°N 126.542728°E | |
| Gyeongju Hyanggyo | | | |
| Haemihyanggyo | 1407 | 36.72083°N 126.54972°E | |
| Haman Chilwonhyanggyo | | 35.308°N 128.5139°E | |
| Hampyeong Hyanggyo | | 35.0683°N 126.5275°E | |
| Hansan Hyanggyo | 1518 | 36.0847139°N 126.7943972°E | |
| Hapcheon Gangyanghyanggyo | | 35.5639°N 128.16139°E | |
| Hayang Hyanggyo | 1580 | 35.929°N 128.8139°E | |
| Hoengseonghyanggyo | | 37.48639°N 127.99361°E | |
| Hongcheon Hyanggyo | | 37.6972°N 127.88972°E | |
| Hongjuhyanggyo | | 36.609417°N 126.665639°E | |
| Hongsanhyanggyo | | | |
| Hwacheonhyanggyo | | 38.10583°N 127.699°E | |
| Imcheonhyanggyo | | 36.1925°N 126.89028°E | |
| Injehyanggyo | 1610 | 38.07194°N 128.174°E | |
| Jainhyanggyo | | 35.8228°N 128.82639°E | |
| Janggihyanggyo | 1396 | 35.896694°N 129.486361°E | |
| Jangheunghyanggyo | 1398 | 34.674417°N 126.8935805°E | |
| Jangseonghyanggyo | | 35.30139°N 126.78083°E | |
| Jeokseonghyanggyo | | 37.963°N 126.92361°E | |
| Jeongeuihyanggyo | 1416 | 33.38694°N 126.8°E | |
| Jeongsanhyanggyo | | 36.41583°N 126.94361°E | |
| Jeongseonhyanggyo | 1110 | 37.38225°N 128.665805°E | |
| Jeonuihyanggyo | 1416 | 36.6805°N 127.19972°E | |
| Jidohyanggyo | 1438 | 35.063417°N 126.205861°E | |
| Jiksan Hyanggyo | 1588 | 36.9025°N 127.158°E | |
| Jinbo Hyanggyo | 1404 | | |
| Jindo Hyanggyo | 1437 | | |
| Jinjamhyanggyo Daeseongjeon | 1405 | 36.3039°N 127.315°E | |
| Jinsanhyanggyo | | 36.154°N 127.37694°E | |
| Jipyeong Hyanggyo | | 37.480833°N 127.636389°E | |
| Mokcheonhyanggyo | 1523 | 36.8019°N 127.228361°E | |
| Muanhyanggyo | 1394 | 34.989583°N 126.467694°E | |
| Myeoncheonhyanggyo | 1392 | 36.8205°N 126.67°E | |
| Naganhyanggyo | | 34.9005°N 127.34472°E | |
| Nampo Hyanggyo | | 36.3051°N 126.61894°E | |
| Nampyeonghyanggyo | 1420 | 35.037194°N 126.847194°E | |
| Neungju Hyanggyo | 1392 | 34.989583°N 126.9513°E | |
| Noseonghyanggyo | | 36.28194°N 127.13°E | |
| Ocheonhyanggyo | 1901 | 36.4182028°N 126.5454°E | |
| Okgwahyanggyo | 1392 | 35.278417°N 127.133528°E | |
| Onyanghyanggyo | 1871 | 36.7628°N 127.01472°E | |
| Samcheokhyanggyo | 1398 | 37.45028°N 129.1665°E | |
| Sancheong Danseonghyanggyo | | 35.3075°N 127.958°E | |
| Sangju Hamchanghyanggyo | | 36.5762°N 128.15505°E | |
| Seocheonhyanggyo | 1413 | 36.07975°N 126.6943361°E | |
| Seokseonghyanggyo | | 36.228°N 126.98972°E | |
| Seosan Hyanggyo | 1406 | 36.791°N 126.452°E | |
| Sinchang Hyanggyo | 1872 | 36.77992°N 126.9288139°E | |
| Sunheunghyanggyo | | 36.93028°N 128.577°E | |
| Taean Hyanggyo | 1407 | 36.759°N 126.29694°E | |
| Wandohyanggyo | 1897 | 34.3461°N 126.728°E | |
| Wonju Hyanggyo | | 37.338875°N 127.9495694°E | |
| Yangyang Hyanggyo | | 38.079°N 128.60639°E | |
| Yean Hyanggyo | 1415 | | |
| Yecheon Hyanggyo | 1407 | | |
| Yeoncheonhyanggyo | 1407 | 38.09583°N 127.06972°E | |
| Yeongamhyanggyo | 1420 | 34.79639°N 126.6925°E | |
| Yeongdeok Yeonghae Hyanggyo | 1346 | 36.538361°N 129.413139°E | |
| Yeongdong Hwangganhyanggyo | 1394 | 36.2283°N 127.91528°E | |
| Yeongdonghyanggyo | | 36.1761°N 127.769°E | |
| Yeonggwanghyanggyo | | 35.2739°N 126.519°E | |
| Yeongihyanggyo | 1416 | 36.543°N 127.281°E | |
| Yeongwolhyanggyo | 1398 | 37.1854°N 128.4754°E | |
| Yeongyanghyanggyo | 1679 | 36.70472°N 129.12361°E | |
| Yeonsanhyanggyo | 1398 | 36.2234861°N 127.209175°E | |
| Yeosuhyanggyo | 1897 | 34.7428°N 127.7325°E | |
| Yesanhyanggyo | 1413 | 36.683817°N 126.8500139°E | |
| Yonggung Hyanggyo | 1398 | 36.593417°N 128.30383°E | |
| Yonginhyanggyo | 1400 | 37.29528°N 127.12083°E | |

End of auto-generated list.

== See also ==
- List of seowon
