= Andong =

City in North Gyeongsang, South Korea

- Municipal City
- Panoramic view of Andong

- Flag Emblem of Andong

- Location in South Korea
- Coordinates: 36°33′33″N 128°43′44″E
- Country: South Korea
- Region: Yeongnam
- First mention: 930
- City status: 1963
- Administrative divisions: 1 eup, 13 myeon, 10 dong

Government
  - mayor: Ki Chang Kwon (권기창)

Area
  - Total: 1,590.91 km^{2} (614.25 sq mi)
- Elevation: 139 m (456 ft)

Population (September 2024)
  - Total: 153,348
  - Density: 96.3901/km^{2} (249.649/sq mi)
  - Dialect: Gyeongsang
- Demonym: Andongite
- Time zone: UTC+9 (Korea Standard Time)
- Postal code: 760003-760944
- Area code: (+82) 054
- Website: Official website

Korean name
- Hangul: 안동시
- Hanja: 安東市
- RR: Andong-si
- MR: Andong-si

Andong (Korean: 안동; pronounced [an.doŋ]) is a city in South Korea, and the capital of North Gyeongsang Province. It is the largest city in the northern part of the province with a population of 167,821 as of October 2010. The Nakdong River flows through the city. Andong is a market centre for the surrounding agricultural areas.

Since the 1970s Andong has developed rapidly, although the population has fallen by nearly seventy thousand as people have moved away to Seoul, Busan, Daegu and other urban centres. In the late 1990s and early 2000s it became a tourism and cultural center.

Andong is known as a centre of culture and folk traditions. The surrounding area maintains many types of traditions and the Andong Folk Festival is held in mid October every year. One of the most famous aspects of these cultural festivities are the Andong masks.

Andong National University, specialising in education and Korean folklore, has grown rapidly since the 1970s. Other tertiary institutions include Andong Science College and Catholic Sangji College. Andong joined the UNESCO Global Network of Learning Cities in 2016.

== History ==
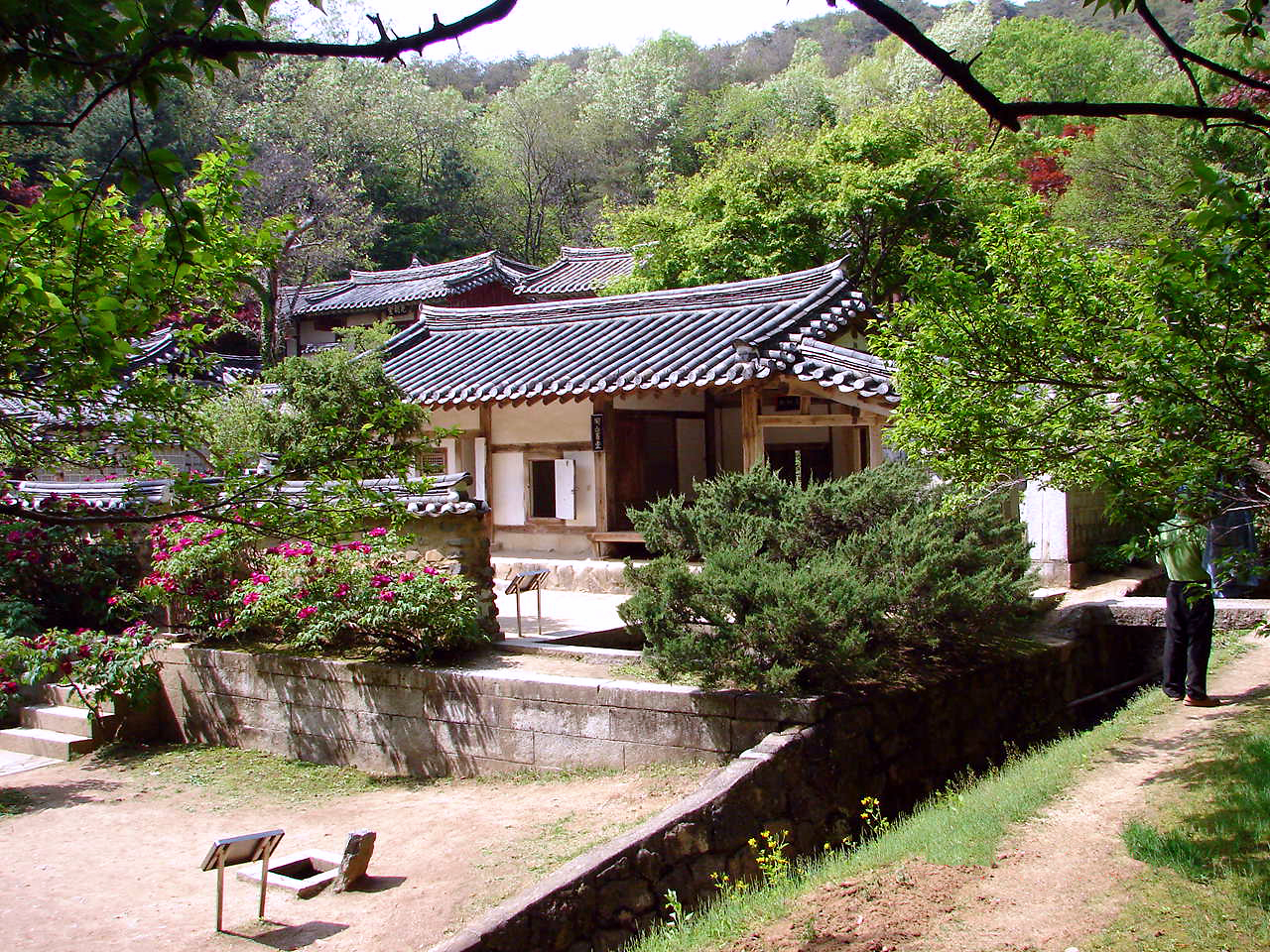
Dosan Seowon

Around 1 BC, Andong was founded by the Jinhan people, and it was known as Gochang. During the Three Kingdoms period, the area was controlled by the Silla kingdom. The Battle of Gochang in 930 was fought here between Hubaekje forces and the Goryeo army led by Wanggeon, who won control of the city and renamed it Andong.

After the ascent of the Joseon dynasty to the throne of Korea, Andong became a centre of Confucianism. The area was extremely conservative for a long time and produced many leading confucian scholars. Toe-gye Yi Hwang (1501–1570), one of the most prominent of all Korean scholars, came from Andong. Yi Hwang retired back to his homeland late in life and started the establishment of the great Confucian academy Dosan Seowon there, which was finished after his death. During this period Andong and its principal families were influential within Korean political circles, of which the three notable families were the Andong Kim, Andong Jang and Andong Kwon clans.

After the 16th century Andong became less influential until the early 19th century, when a marriage of the local Kim family resulted in strong influence on the royal family.

Andong was the site of intense fighting during the Korean War in the early 1950s, the Battle of Andong. Although the city was almost destroyed, it was quickly rebuilt. In 1976 the Andong Dam was built, providing the city with a reliable source of electricity.

In 1999, Her Majesty the Queen Elizabeth II of the United Kingdom celebrated her 73rd birthday in the city. There is an exhibit dedicated to this historic visit at Hahoe folk village museum. Andong soju is made using traditional methods that are centuries old unlike its popular modern counterparts. It is protected by government regulation to preserve authenticity and commands a steep premium in the marketplace.

== Administrative divisions ==
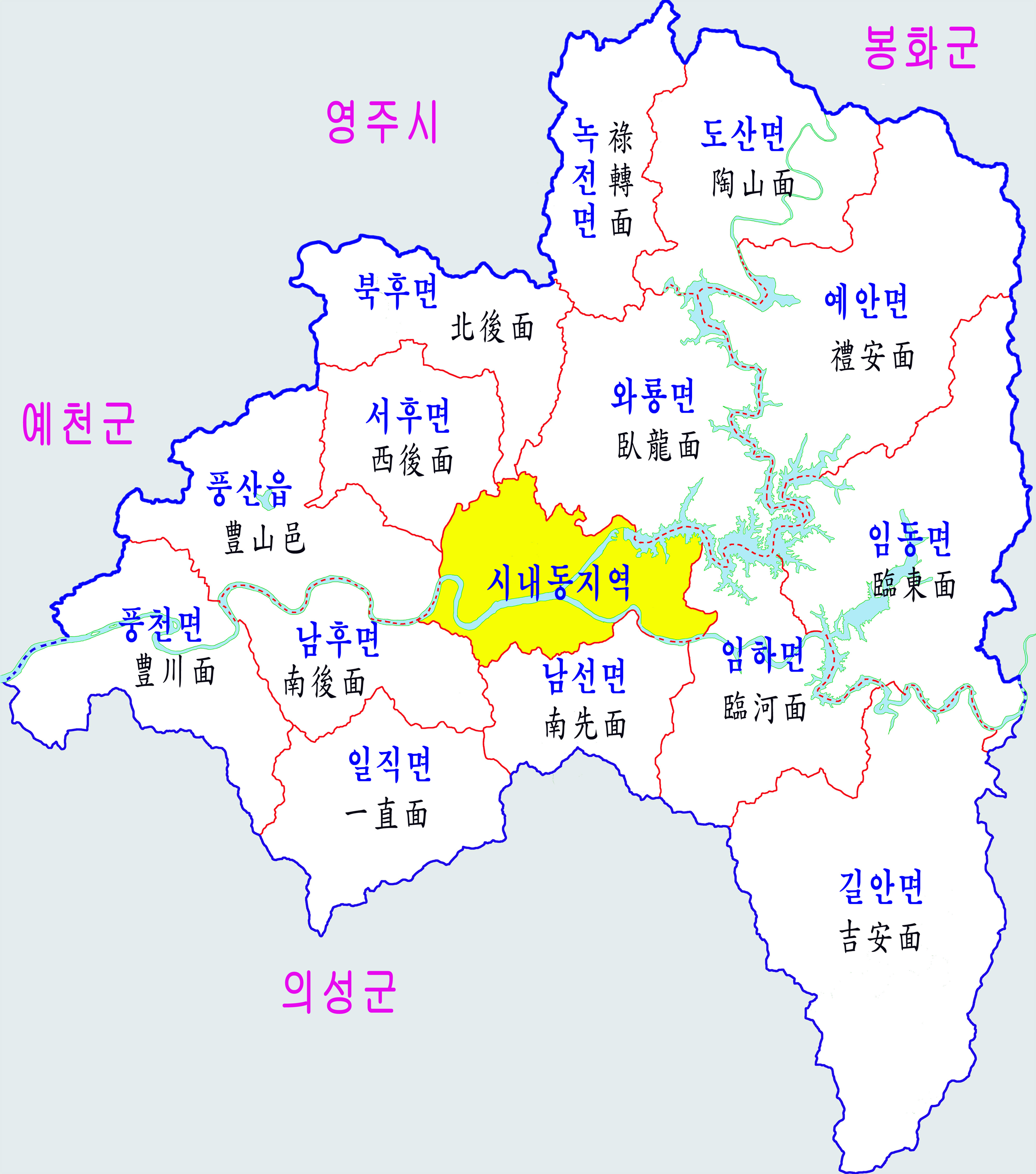
Map of Andong's eup, myeon and dong. Note that the map is in Hangeul and Hanja.

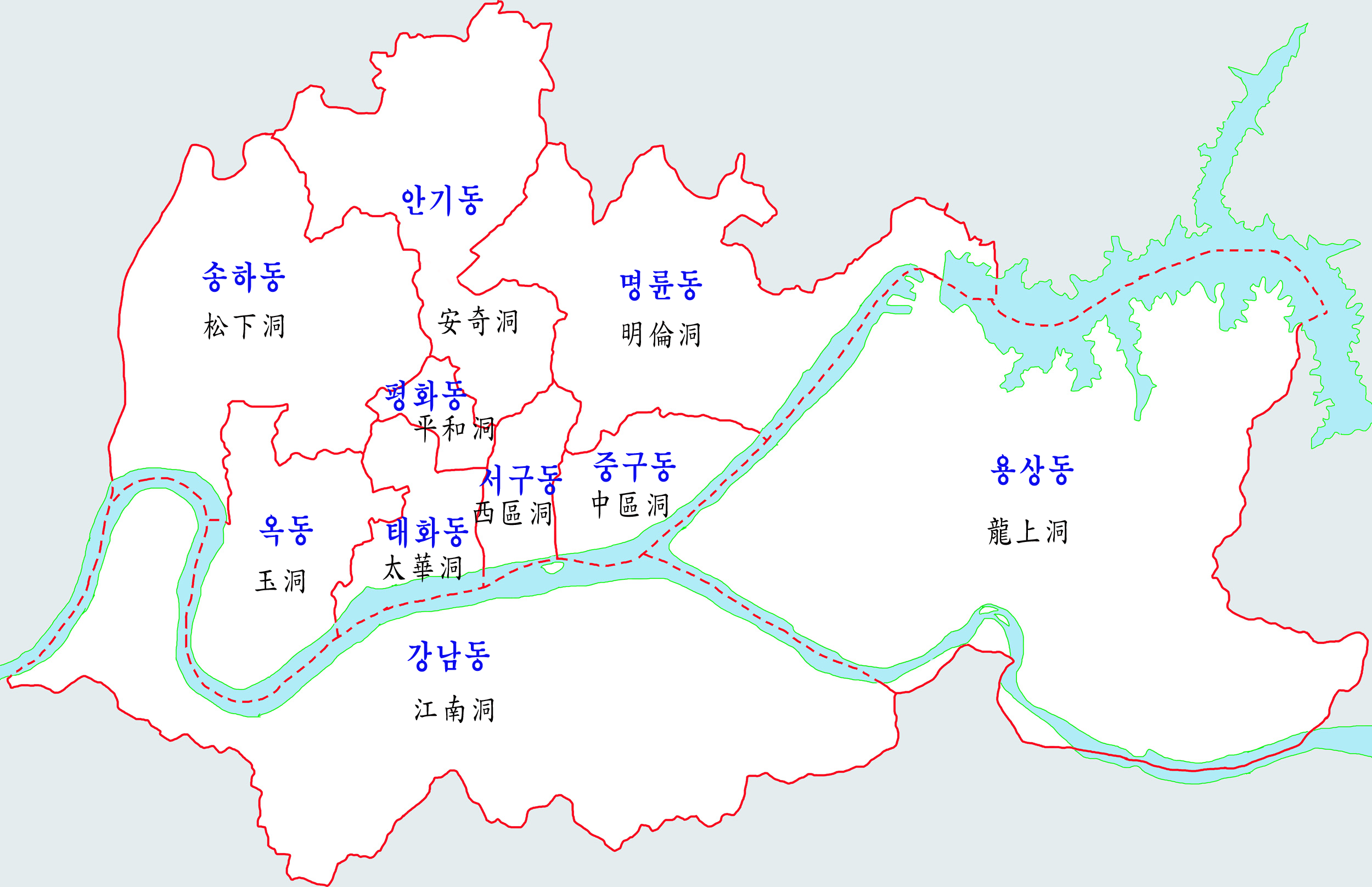
Map of Andong city core.

Andong is divided into 1 eup, 13 myeon and 10 dong. The following is a list of eup, myeon and dong:

Name	Hangeul	Hanja
Pungsan-eup	풍산읍	豊山邑
Waryeong-myeon	와룡면	臥龍面
Bukhu-myeon	북후면	北後面
Seohu-myeon	서후면	西後面
Pungcheon-myeon	풍천면	豊川面
Iljik-myeon	일직면	一直面
Namhu-myeon	남후면	南後面
Namseon-myeon	남선면	南先面
Imha-myeon	임하면	臨河面
Giran-myeon	길안면	吉安面
Imdong-myeon	임동면	臨東面
Yean-myeon	예안면	禮安面
Dosan-myeon	도산면	陶山面
Nokjeon-myeon	녹전면	祿轉面
Junggu-dong	중구동	中區洞
Myeongryun-dong	명륜동	明倫洞
Yongsang-dong	용상동	龍上洞
Seogu-dong	서구동	西區洞
Taehwa-dong	태화동	太華洞
Pyeonghwa-dong	평화동	平和洞
Angi-dong	안기동	安奇洞
Ok-dong	옥동	玉洞
Songha-dong	송하동	松下洞
Gangnam-dong	강남동	江南洞

== Local specialty foods ==
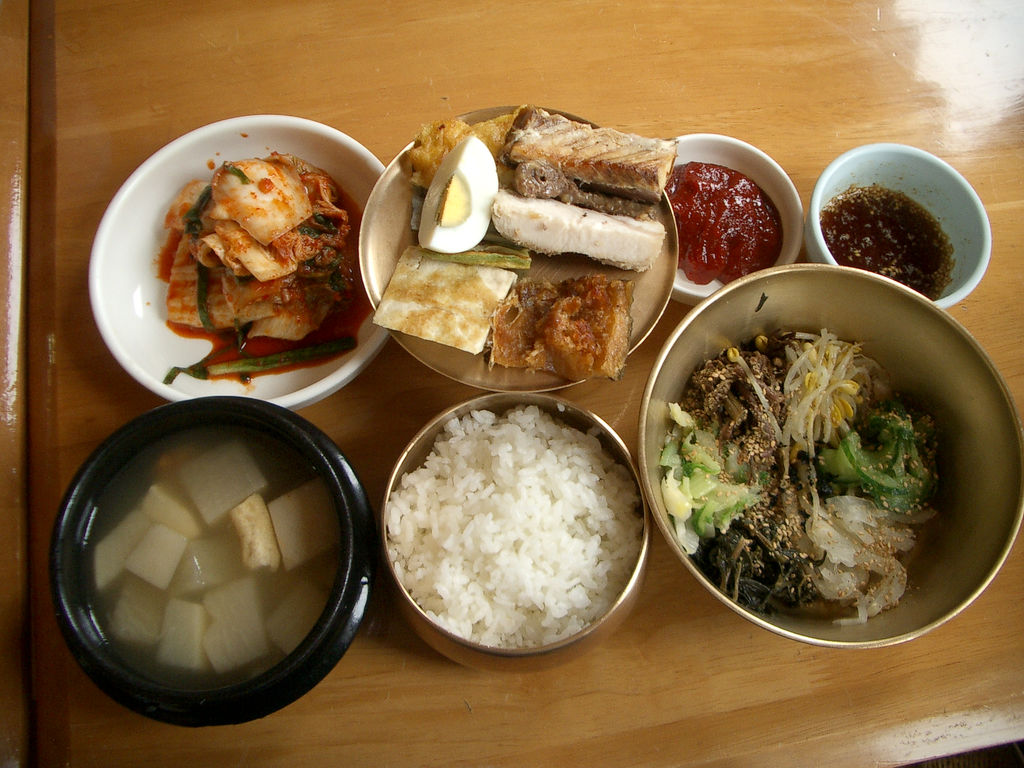
Heotjesabap

Andong has famous local foods that originated in the city such as heotjesabap, Andong jjimdak, Andong soju (a rice wine), Andong sikhye (a punch), Geonjin guksu (a noodle dish), and salted mackerel.

Heotjesabap (헛제삿밥) is a variety of bibimbap, served with soy sauce (ganjang) instead of the gochujang (hot pepper paste) that is more commonly used. Heotjesa bab consists mainly of several types of namul (young sprouted vegetables) over white rice. It is also served with grilled fish, shark, and jeon (Korean pancake). The dish originated in Andong. The term, Heotjesa bap literally means "dishes for fake jesa" that are ceremonies for death anniversary and ancestor veneration held in Korea. The reason it is considered fake is that it is not covered in incense ash, as would happen to any food sacrificed in a jesa ritual.

Andong jjimdak is a variety of jjim (a Korean steamed or braised dish), made with chicken, cellophane noodles, and various vegetables marinated in a ganjang (Korean soy sauce) based sauce. The name literally means "steamed chicken of Andong." There are many speculations on the origins of the dish. One is that the it is a specialty food of the inner rich village of Andong during the Joseon period, prepared and eaten for special occasions. The more likely explanation is that during the 1980s in the Dak golmok (닭골목; lit. 'chicken alley') of the "Andong Old Market," restaurant owners there made a dish including ingredients that regulars demanded, which became the current Andong jjimdak. Restaurateurs in the area claim it was invented by five local old women who had limited chicken supplies and wanted to stretch it out. The most plausible speculation among existing assumptions is that merchants of the Dak golmok at the market created the dish to keep their position against the rapid expansion of Western fried chicken shops.

Andong Soju is a specialty of the region. It is made with natural ingredients, unlike mass-produced brands, it was historically used for medicinal purposes, and was developed during the Silla period. Andong soju was traditionally made by the wife of a household, and she passed down the secrets to her daughters-in-law.

Mackerel is another popular local delicacy. Caught downstream where the Nakdong River meets the sea, in ancient times the fish would spoil before being brought further inland. Using special salting techniques, Andong was the furthest inland the fish could be brought, so aristocrats would travel to Andong specially for the salted fish.

Sikhye is a fermented rice punch served across Korea. The Andong variety, however, is particularly spicy, made with powdered red pepper, ginger, and radish. Sikhye contains lactobacillus, a benign strain of bacteria found in the gastrointestinal tract, and often used as a digestive aid in dishes including kimchi, yogurt, and sauerkraut, among others.

== Culture ==
=== Museums ===
- Andong Soju and Traditional Food Museum
- Gyeongsangbuk-do Forest Science Museum
- Kwon Jeong Saeng Fairy Tale Museum
- Municipal Folk Museum
- Seonseonghyun Cultural Heritage Complex
- Traditional Cultural Contents Museum

=== Parks ===
- Gyemyeongsan Recreation Forest
- Amsan Pleasure Ground

=== Villages ===
- Andong Gunja Village
- Yeumteo Village
- Jirye Arts Village
- Hahoe Folk Village

=== Confucian Academies ===
- Dosan Seowon
- Byeongsan Seowon
- Imcheon Seowon
- Gosan Seowon

=== Mountains ===
- Gallasan Mountain
- Cheondeungsan Mountain

=== Monuments ===
- Gyeongsangbuk-do Independence Movement Memorial

=== Experiences ===
- Dosan Hot Spring
- Andong Maskdance Festival
- Hahoe Mask Dance.
- Hakgasan Hot Spring

== Architecture ==
=== Historical ===
- Bongjeongsa, a Buddhist monastery
- Mukgye Seowon
- Seven-story Brick Pagoda at Beopheungsa Temple Site
- Nongam Jongtaek
- Andong imcheonggak
- Taesamyo
- Confucian Land

=== Modern ===
- Gyeongbuk Provincial Government Office

== Special product ==
- Wol Young Yakgwa
- Hahoe mask bread

== Education ==
- Andong Manner School
- Advanced Center for Korean Studies

== Transport ==
=== Air ===
The city does not have its own airport. The nearest international airport is Daegu International Airport, located 92 kilometres (57 mi) south of Andong.

== Sports ==
- Andong Gymnasium

== Visitor attractions in Andong ==
The Hahoe Folk Village is perhaps the most notable folk village in South Korea. This village is listed by the South Korean government with UNESCO as a World Heritage site with Yangdong Folk Village in 2010.

Andong is also a home of Confucian studies and academies during the Joseon period. The notable examples of seowon, or Confucian academy are Dosan Seowon that enshrines Yi Hwang, Byeongsan Seowon for Yu Sŏngnyong, Imcheon Seowon for Kim Sŏngil, Gosan Seowon, Hwacheon Seowon and others. Other notable visitor destinations are Sisadan, Jirye Artists' Colony, Bongjeongsa temple and Andong Icheondong Seokbulsang aka Jebiwon Stone Buddha.

Andong also has Andong Dam. In the area where Andong Dam is located, there is a monument to the Andong Samil Movement to honor the March First Movement. In addition, there are Wonmom theme parks and Unbu parks.

== Festival ==
- Andong International Mask Dance Festival

== Climate ==
Andong has a humid continental climate (Köppen: Dwa), but can be considered a borderline humid subtropical climate (Köppen: Cwa) using the −3 °C (27 °F) isotherm. The city is located in the mountainous region of central South Korea and is part of the temperate climate. Temperatures vary widely, fog is high at 79 days per year, seasonal winds are northwest in winter and northwest in summer.

Climate data for Andong (1991–2020 normals, extremes 1973–present)
Month	Jan	Feb	Mar	Apr	May	Jun	Jul	Aug	Sep	Oct	Nov	Dec	Year
Record high °C (°F)	13.2 (55.8)	23.2 (73.8)	26.6 (79.9)	32.1 (89.8)	35.1 (95.2)	35.7 (96.3)	38.9 (102.0)	38.8 (101.8)	36.0 (96.8)	29.0 (84.2)	25.1 (77.2)	17.0 (62.6)	38.9 (102.0)
Mean daily maximum °C (°F)	4.0 (39.2)	7.0 (44.6)	12.6 (54.7)	19.5 (67.1)	24.7 (76.5)	27.9 (82.2)	29.5 (85.1)	30.1 (86.2)	25.8 (78.4)	20.5 (68.9)	13.0 (55.4)	5.9 (42.6)	18.4 (65.1)
Daily mean °C (°F)	−1.8 (28.8)	0.8 (33.4)	6.0 (42.8)	12.4 (54.3)	17.8 (64.0)	21.9 (71.4)	24.8 (76.6)	25.1 (77.2)	20.0 (68.0)	13.5 (56.3)	6.4 (43.5)	−0.1 (31.8)	12.2 (54.0)
Mean daily minimum °C (°F)	−7.2 (19.0)	−5.1 (22.8)	−0.2 (31.6)	5.5 (41.9)	11.2 (52.2)	16.5 (61.7)	21.0 (69.8)	21.2 (70.2)	15.5 (59.9)	8.0 (46.4)	1.0 (33.8)	−5.3 (22.5)	6.8 (44.2)
Record low °C (°F)	−20.4 (−4.7)	−18.6 (−1.5)	−11.5 (11.3)	−4.3 (24.3)	1.8 (35.2)	6.1 (43.0)	11.8 (53.2)	12.0 (53.6)	4.0 (39.2)	−4.2 (24.4)	−11.8 (10.8)	−16.0 (3.2)	−20.4 (−4.7)
Average precipitation mm (inches)	16.7 (0.66)	24.9 (0.98)	44.5 (1.75)	74.0 (2.91)	85.1 (3.35)	123.1 (4.85)	235.2 (9.26)	226.4 (8.91)	119.8 (4.72)	46.5 (1.83)	30.9 (1.22)	18.6 (0.73)	1,045.7 (41.17)
Average precipitation days (≥ 0.1 mm)	4.9	4.9	7.2	8.0	8.7	9.6	14.2	13.9	9.0	5.7	6.2	5.5	97.8
Average snowy days	5.5	3.7	2.6	0.3	0.0	0.0	0.0	0.0	0.0	0.0	0.8	4.1	17
Average relative humidity (%)	59.9	57.3	56.8	55.4	61.0	68.8	77.5	77.7	76.5	72.7	68.2	62.7	66.2
Mean monthly sunshine hours	194.8	193.8	214.1	222.3	235.2	200.4	161.9	172.8	157.0	188.5	166.7	185.1	2,292.6
Percentage possible sunshine	59.9	59.7	54.1	55.6	51.4	43.4	33.4	39.8	40.5	52.0	53.5	58.9	49.3
Source: Korea Meteorological Administration (percent sunshine 1981–2010)

== Gallery ==
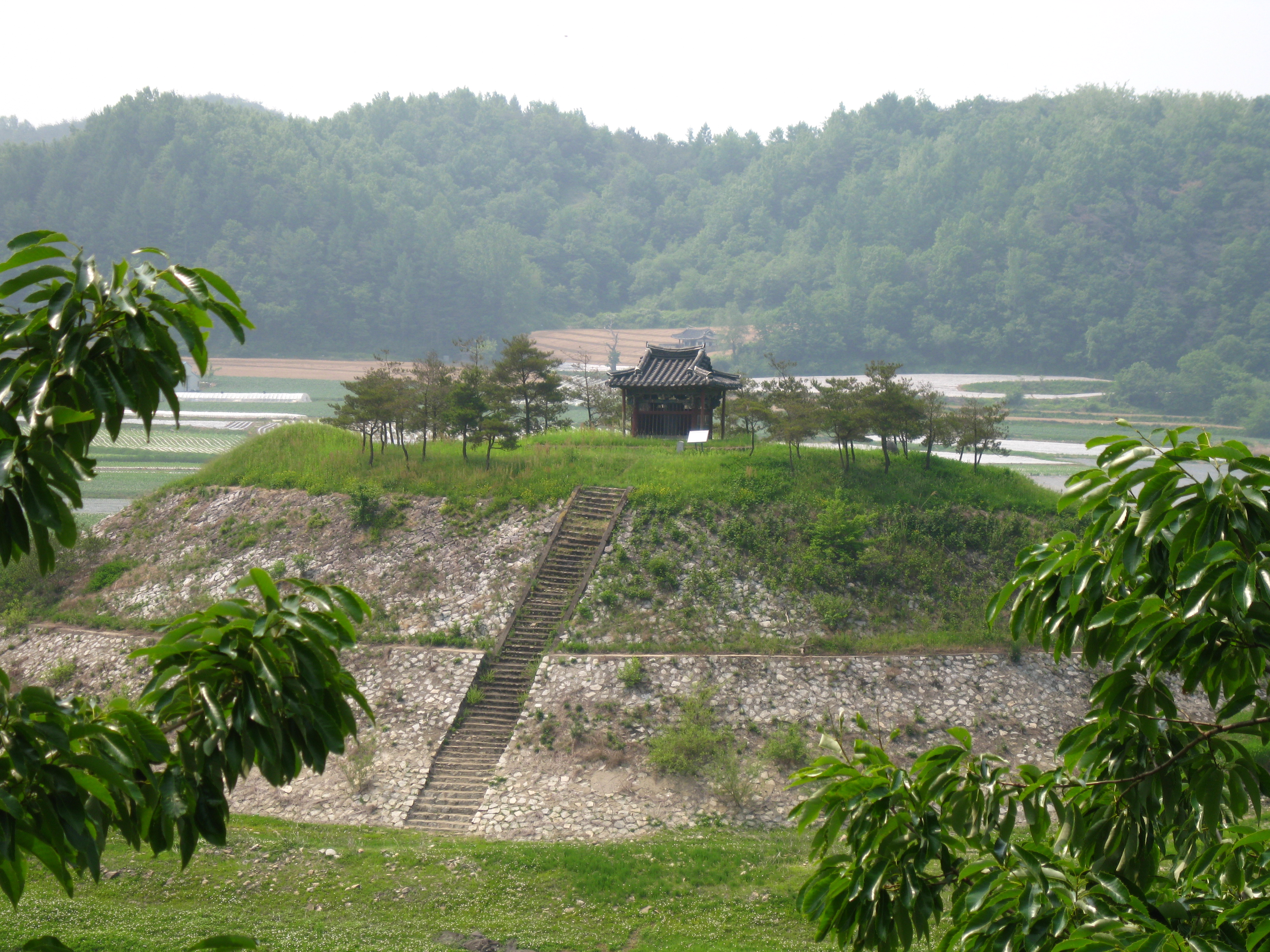
Sisadan

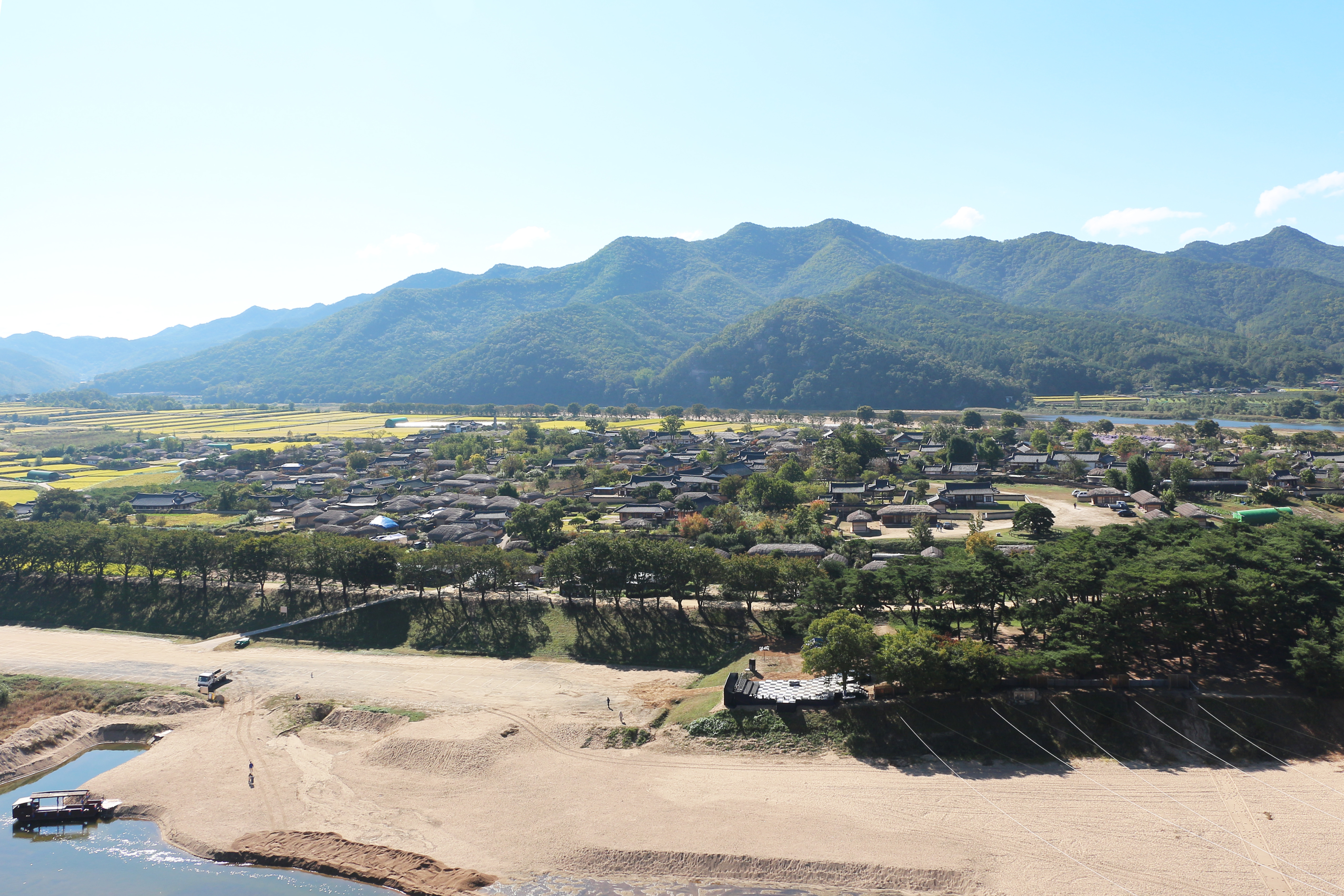
Hahoe Folk Village

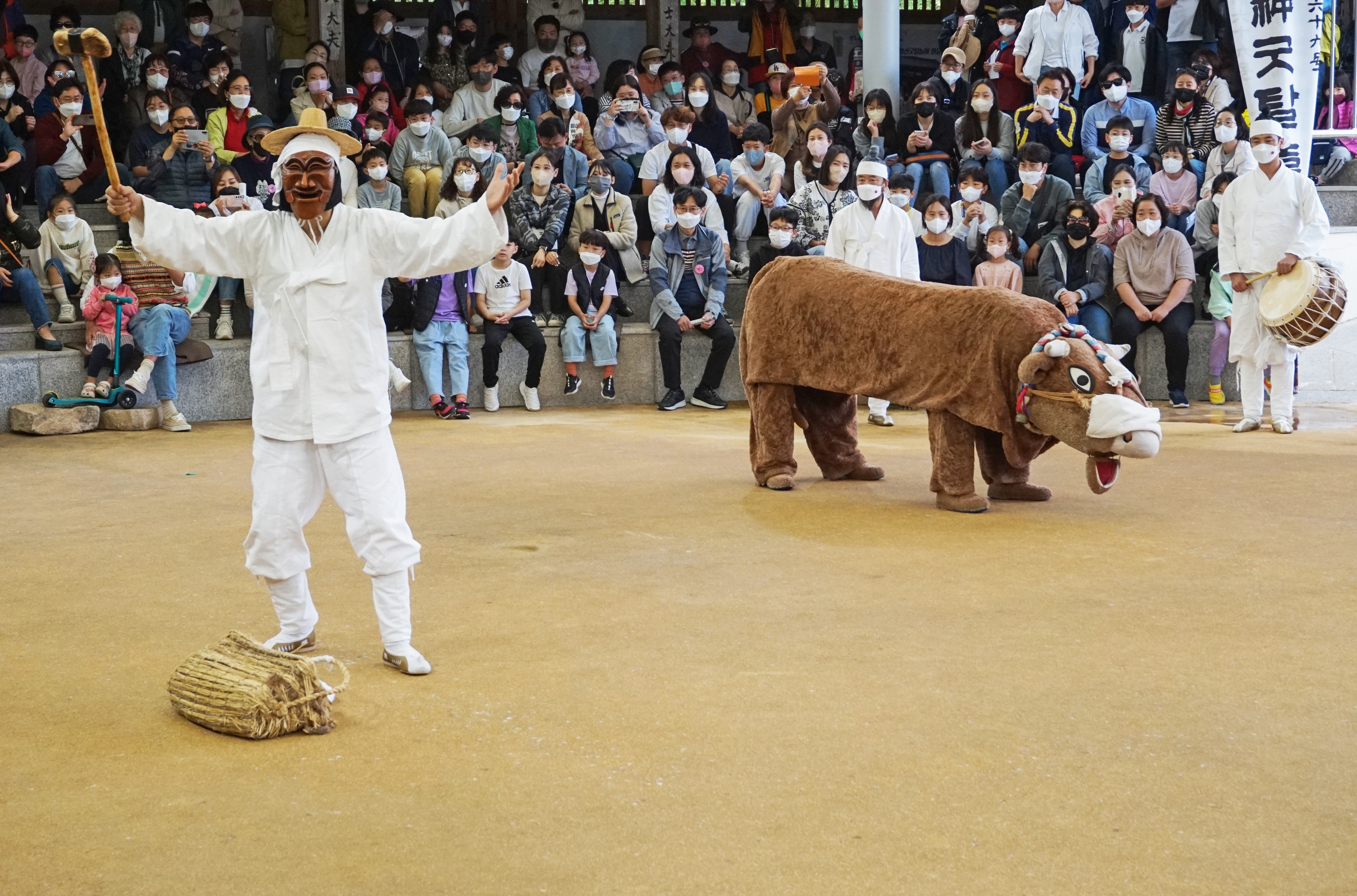
Hahoe Dance Mask

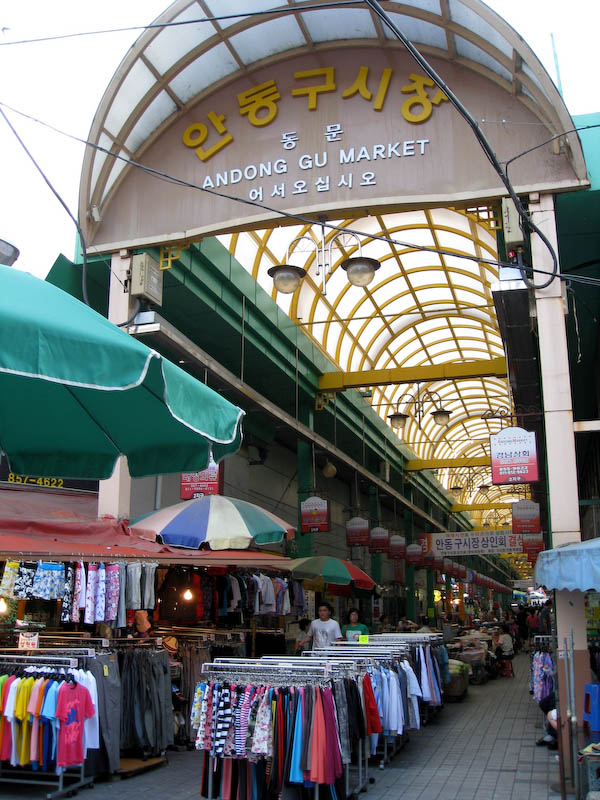
Andong Gu Market, food market in downtown Andong

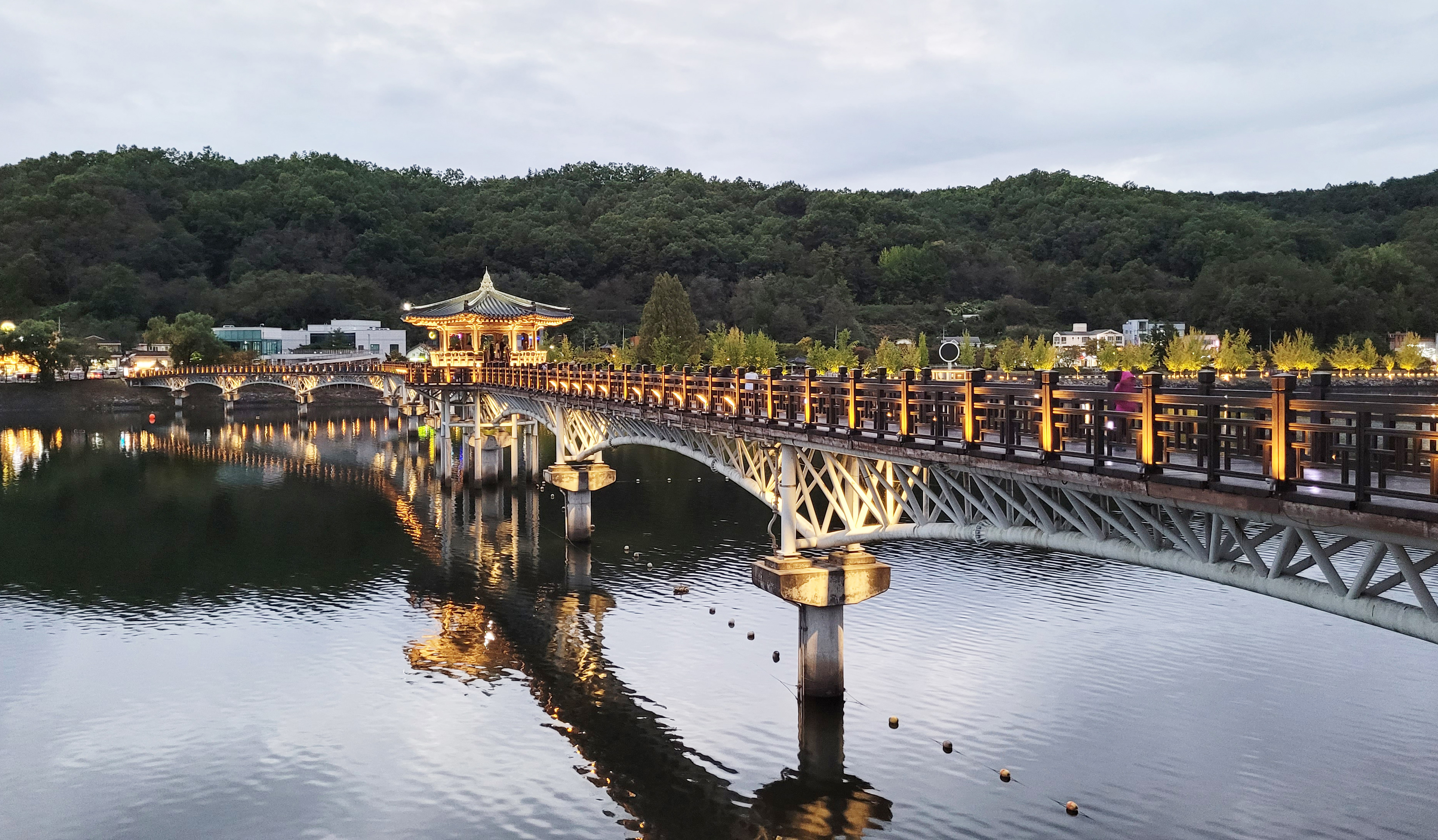
Woryeonggyo, Bridge in Sang-a dong, Andong

== Sister cities ==
Andong has a sister city relationship with:

- Corinth, Greece
- Cusco, Peru
- Pingdingshan, China
- Sagae, Japan
- Xi'an, China
- Shusha, Azerbaijan

== People from Andong ==
- Cho Yoon-jeong (born 1979), tennis player
- Ji Han-jae (born 1936), martial artist, Hapkido grandmaster and actor
- Lee Elijah (born 1990), actress
- Lee Jae-myung (born 1964), President of South Korea
- Kim Jin-kyu (1922–1998), actor, film director and producer
- Kim Jong-gil (1926–2017), poet
- Kim Mi-soon, Paralympic archer
- Park Ki-woong (born 1985), actor
- Park So-yeon (born 1987), singer, actress and K-pop idol (T-ara)
- Kim "Canna" Chang-dong (born 2000), professional League of Legends player, currently a top laner for DWG KIA
- Ryu Si-won (born 1972), South Korean actor, singer and photographer
- Kim Byung-chul (born 1974), South Korean actor

== See also ==
- Geography of South Korea
- List of cities in South Korea
