= Pungsan-eup =

- Interactive map of Pungsan-eup
- Coordinates: 36°34′48″N 128°34′19″E
- Country: South Korea
- Administrative divisions: 34 ri

Area
  - Total: 96.64 km^{2} (37.31 sq mi)

Population
  - Total: 8,130
  - Density: 84.1/km^{2} (218/sq mi)

Korean name
- Hangul: 풍산읍
- Hanja: 豊山邑
- RR: Pungsan-eup
- MR: P'ungsan-ŭp

Pungsan-eup (Korean: 풍산읍) is a town in Andong in the southeast section of South Korea. Situated along the Nakdong River just west of central Andong, it lies on a popular tourist route connecting the city center with the Hahoe Maeul folk village in Pungcheon-myeon. Local landmarks include the Yucheon Museum of Hanji Art.

The area is well known as a hub of traditional Korean Confucianism, and is home to the former yangban lineages Pungsan Ryu, Pungsan Hong and Pungsan Kim.

== Pungsan Hong ==
All ancestry of Andong's Pungsan Hong may be traced to the Goryeo dynasty's Hong Ji-gyeong later known as a great master of Korean classical verse in the Joseon dynasty. The Pungsan Hong were known as yangban among yangbans. Hong Jin was a direct descendant of Hong Ji-gyeong.

== See also ==
- Andong
- Administrative divisions of South Korea
- Geography of South Korea
