= Seowon =

Joseon-era private schools in Korea

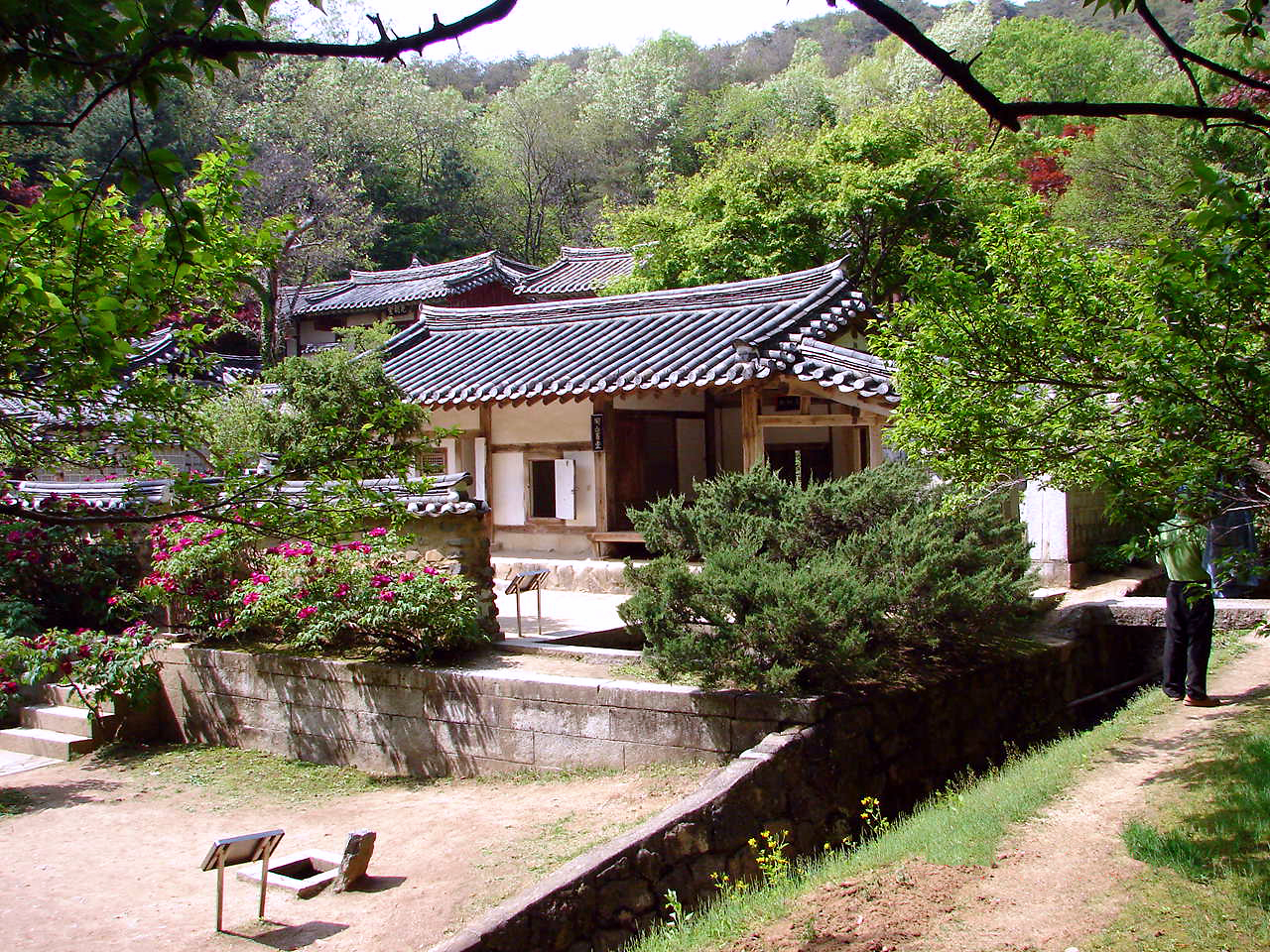
- Dosan Seowon in Andong which was depicted on the reverse of the South Korean 1,000 South Korean won bill from 1975 to 2007.

Korean name
- Hangul: 서원
- Hanja: 書院
- RR: seowon
- MR: sŏwŏn

Seowon (Korean: 서원) were common educational institutions of Korea during the Joseon Dynasty. They were private institutions, and combined the functions of a Confucian shrine and a Confucian school. The seowon were primarily occupied with preparing young men for the national civil service examinations. In most cases, seowon served only pupils of the aristocratic yangban class. On 6 July 2019, UNESCO recognized a collection of nine seowon as World Heritage Sites.

== History ==
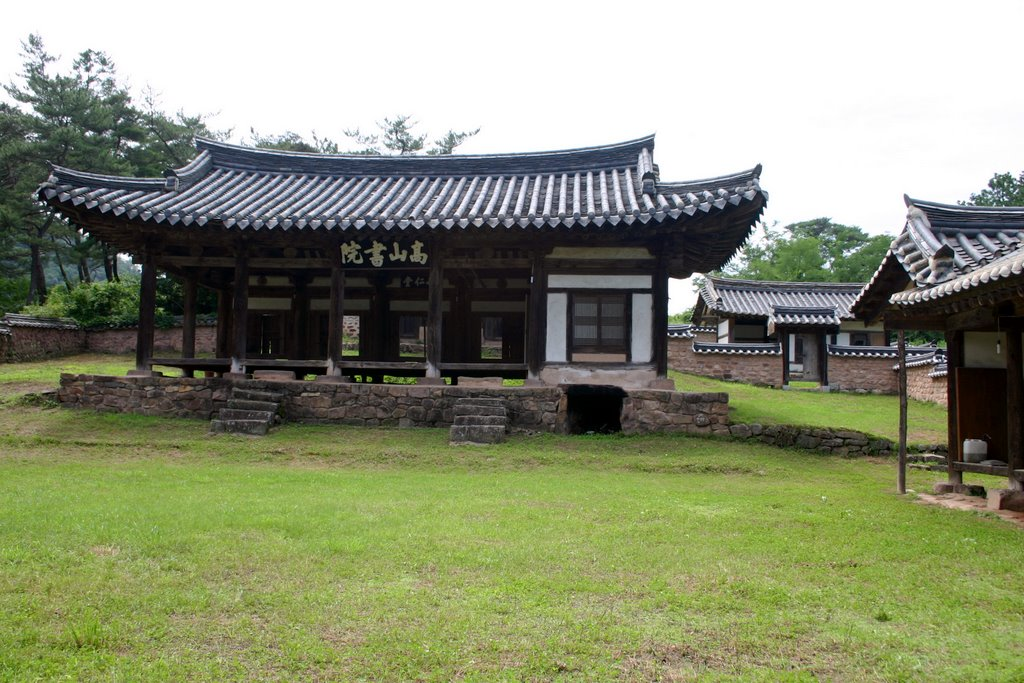
Gosan seowon

Seowons first appeared in Korea in the early Joseon Dynasty, whose establishment were driven mainly by the Sarim Neo-Confucian scholars. While the exact year of seowon introduction in Korea is not known for certain, in 1418 King Sejong issued rewards to two scholars for their work in setting up seowons in Gimje and Gwangju. The first seowon to receive a royal charter was the Sosu Seowon in Punggi, presided over by Toegye, which was given a hanging board by King Myeongjong in 1550. While historian Michael Shin mentions that the earliest seowon was established in North Gyeongsang by Ju Sebung (1495–1554).

Large numbers of seowons were established by leading seonbi (literati), or by local groups of yangban families. Some of the Sarim scholars who retired to villages in the wake of literati purges of the 16th century used the seowons as their political bases.

They were modeled after early private Chinese academies of classical learning shuyuan. The latter originated in the 8th century under the Tang dynasty, and were later dismantled under the Yuan dynasty to become preparatory schools for the imperial examinations under government control.

Most seowon were closed by an edict of the regent Daewon-gun in the turbulent final years of the 19th century. He banned the unauthorized construction of seowons in 1864, and removed their tax exemption in 1868; finally, in 1871, he ordered all but a handful closed. The provincial yangban were outraged by these measures, and this is among the reasons that Daewon-gun was driven from power in 1873; however, the seowon remained closed.

== World Heritage Site ==
Seowon, Korean Neo-Confucian Academies
UNESCO World Heritage Site
- Includes: Nine seowon sites in South Korea
- Criteria: Cultural: (iii)
- Reference: 1498
- Inscription: 2019 (43rd Session)
- Area: 102.49 ha (253.3 acres)
- Buffer zone: 796.74 ha (1,968.8 acres)

Seowon, Korean Neo-Confucian Academies is a World Heritage Site consisting of a selection of nine seowon:

- Sosu Seowon, Yeongju, Gyeongsangbuk-do
- Namgye Seowon, Hamyang County, Gyeongsangnam-do
- Oksan Seowon, Gyeongju, Gyeongsangbuk-do
- Dosan Seowon, Andong, Gyeongsangbuk-do
- Piram Seowon, Jangseong County, Jeollanam-do
- Dodong Seowon, Dalseong County, Daegu Metropolitan City
- Byeongsan Seowon, Andong, Gyeongsangbuk-do
- Museong Seowon, Jeongeup, Jeollabuk-do
- Donam Seowon, Nonsan, Chungcheongnam-do

=== Korean cultural heritage sites ===
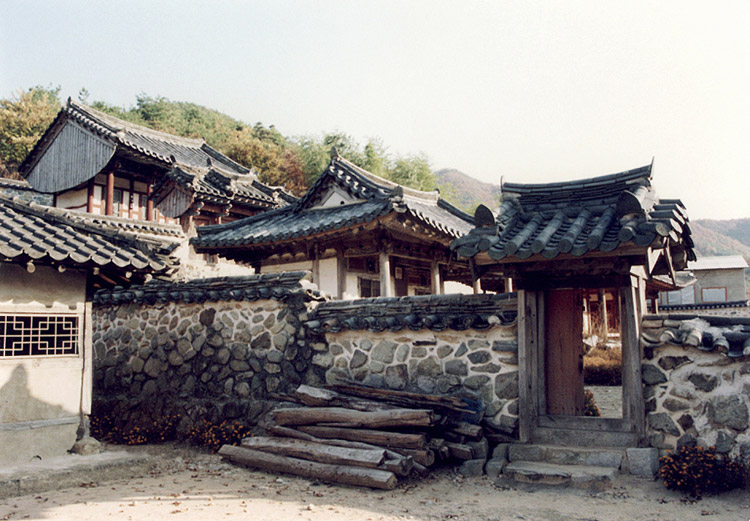
Galcheon Seowon

In 1741 (Yeongjo 17), when seowon were abolished due the corruption associated with them and because of their role in factional politics, the number of seowon was close to 1,000.

Currently, approximately 150 seowon are cultural heritage sites in South Korea, with many having been restored. They continue to function as shrines to Confucian scholars who performed some significant service to Joseon, contributed to Joseon learning, or were simply family members, but seowons also may also be used for events, such as academic colloquia. See for example, Gangseon Seowon, Hyoam Seowon , and Galcheon Seowon.

== See also ==
- Education in the Joseon Dynasty
- Korean Confucianism
- History of Korea
- List of seowon
- Academies (Shuyuan) (Chinese equivalent to seowon)
