= Yi Hwang =

Korean Confucian scholar (1501–1570)

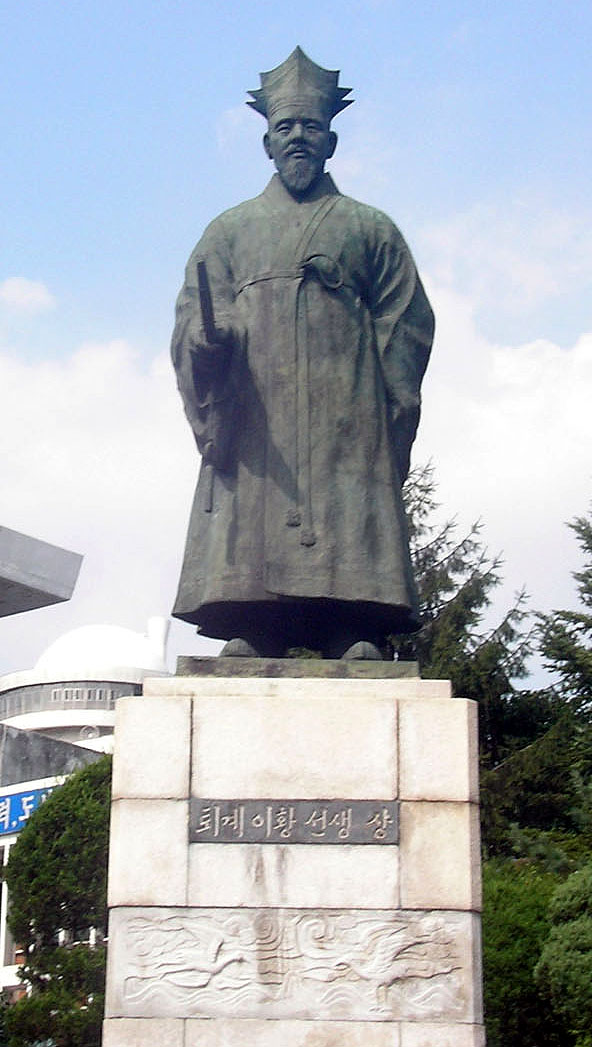
- Statue of Yi in Namsan

Korean name
- Hangul: 이황
- Hanja: 李滉
- RR: I Hwang
- MR: I Hwang

Art name
- Hangul: 퇴계
- Hanja: 退溪
- RR: Toegye
- MR: T'oegye

Courtesy name
- Hangul: 경호
- Hanja: 景浩
- RR: Gyeongho
- MR: Kyŏngho

Posthumous name
- Hangul: 문순
- Hanja: 文純
- RR: Munsun
- MR: Munsun

Yi Hwang (Korean: 이황; Hanja: 李滉; 1501–1570) was a Korean philosopher, writer, and Confucian scholar of the Joseon period. He is considered the most important philosopher of Korea - he is honored by printing his portrait on the 1000 South Korean won banknote, on the reverse of which one can see an image of his school, Dosan Seowon. He was of the Neo-Confucian literati, established the Yeongnam School and set up the Dosan Seowon, a private Confucian academy.

Yi Hwang is often referred to by his art name Toegye ("Retreating Creek"). His courtesy name was Gyeongho.

His interpretation of Neo-Confucianism was influential not only in Korea, but also in Japan, Taiwan, and Vietnam, and is now being studied even in the mainland China. His main work, Ten Diagrams on Sage Learning, originally published in classical Chinese language, has been already translated into modern Korean, Japanese, Vietnamese, English, French, German, Russian and Polish.

Some of his writings were looted by the Japanese military during the Japanese invasion of Korea.

== Biography ==
Yi Hwang was born in Ongye-ri, Andong, in the north of Gyeongsang Province, in 1501. He belonged to the Jinbo Yi clan, and was the youngest son among eight children. A child prodigy, he learned the Analects of Confucius from his uncle at age twelve and admiring the poetry of Tao Yuanming, started writing poetry. His poem Yadang ("Pond in the Wild"), written at the age of eighteen, is considered one of his major works. Around the age of twenty, he immersed himself in the study of I Ching and Neo-Confucianism.

He came to Seoul (then known as Hanseong) when he was 23 years old and entered the national academy Sungkyunkwan in 1523. In 1527 he passed preliminary exams to become a government official, but re-entered Sungkyunkwan at the age of 33 and socialized with the scholar Kim In-hu. He passed the civil service exams with top honors in 1534 and continued his scholarly pursuits whilst working for the government. He returned to his childhood home at the death of his mother at the age of 37 and mourned her for 3 years. He was appointed various positions from the age of 39 and sometimes held multiple positions including secret royal inspector, or Amhaengeosa, in 1542. His integrity made him relentless as he took part in purges of corrupt government officials. On numerous occasions he was even exiled from the capital for his firm commitment to principle.

Yi Hwang was disillusioned by the power struggles and discord in the royal court during the later years of King Jungjong's reign and left political office. However, he was continuously brought out of retirement and held several positions away from the royal court and in rural areas. He was the governor of Danyang at 48 and governor of Punggi afterwards. During his days at Pungi he redeveloped and improved the private Neo-Confucian academy Baekundong Seowon established by his predecessor Ju Se-bung.

He was named Daesaseong (head instructor) of Sungkyunkwan in 1552 but turned down other prominent offices later on. In 1560, he established the Dosan seodang and engrossed himself in meditation, study, and teaching his disciples. King Myeongjong tried to coax him back to political office, but he was steadfast in his devotion to study. He finally returned to the royal court at 67 upon the king's request when envoys from the Ming dynasty came to Seoul. When King Myeongjong suddenly died, his successor King Seonjo appointed Yi Hwang as Yejo panseo (minister of rites) but he declined and returned to his home once again.

However, the king continuously called Yi Hwang back and unable to refuse further, he resumed office at the age of 68 and wrote many advisory documents including Seonghak sipdo ("Ten Diagrams on Sage Learning"). He also gave lectures from the teachings of Song dynasty Confucian scholars Cheng Yi and Cheng Hao, I Ching, Analects, and Zhang Zai in royal presence. He finally retired from politics at the age of 70 and died in 1570.

During forty years of public life he served four kings (Jungjong, Injong, Myeongjong and Seonjo). On his death, Yi Hwang was posthumously promoted to the highest ministerial rank, and his mortuary tablet housed in a Confucian shrine as well as in the shrine of King Seonjo. His disciples and followers reorganized the Dosan seodang to Dosan Seowon in 1574.

== Teachings ==
Yi Hwang was the author of many books on Confucianism. He followed the dualistic Neo-Confucianism teachings of Zhu Xi, which views i (Chinese "li") and gi (Chinese "qi") as the forces of foundation of the universe. Yi Hwang placed emphasis on the i, the formative element, as the existential force that determines gi. This school of thought contrasted with the school that focused on the concrete element of gi, established by Yi Hwang's counterpart Yi I. Understanding the determinative pattern of i would be more essential in understanding the universe than recognizing the principles that govern individual manifestations of gi. This approach of placing importance on the role of i became the core of the Yeongnam School, where Yi Hwang's legacy was carried on by prominent figures such as Yu Sŏngnyong and Kim Sŏngil.

Yi Hwang was also talented in calligraphy and poetry, writing a collection of sijo, a three line poetic form popular with the literati of the Joseon period.

== Selected works ==
These are some of Yi Hwang's published writings:

- 1599 — 退溪全書
- 1681 — The Ten Diagrams on Sage Learning
- 1746 — 退溪集
- Outline and Explanations of the Works of Zhu Xi
- Commentary on the Heart Sutra
- History of Neo-Confucianism in the Song, Yuan and Ming Dynasties
- The Four-Seven Debate: discusses Mencius's philosophy with Gi Dae-seung

=== Ten Diagrams on Sage Learning ===
The Neo-Confucian literature of Seonghaksipdo was composed by Yi Hwang in 1568 for King Seonjo. It is a series of lectures for rulers through examples of past sages. Traditional Confucians had affirmed that any man could learn to become a sage; the new Confucians made the ideal of sagehood real and attainable, just as enlightenment was for Buddhists. Yi Hwang intended to present that path by starting each chapter with a diagram and related text drawn from Zhu Xi or another leading authority, and concluding with a brief commentary. He intended for "Ten Diagrams" to be made into a ten paneled standing screen, as well as a short book, so that the mind of the viewer could be constantly engaged with its contents, until it totally assimilated the material.

== Legacy ==
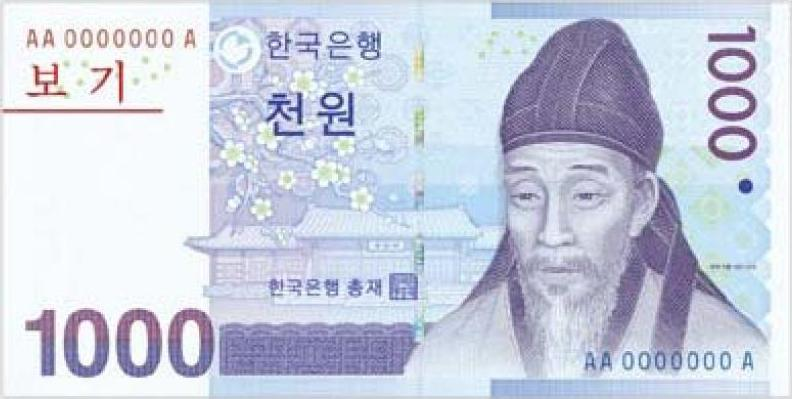
Yi Hwang on the currently circulating 1,000 won note

Toegyero, a street in central Seoul, is named after him, and he is depicted on the South Korean 1,000 won note. The Taekwon-Do pattern Toi-Gye was named in honor of Yi Hwang.

Many institutes and university research departments devoted to Yi Hwang have been established. The Toegye Studies Institute set up in Seoul in 1970, Kyungpook National University's Toegye Institute opened in 1979, and an institute and library in Dankook University in 1986. There are research institutes in Tokyo, Taiwan, Hamburg, and the United States.

A notable direct descendant of Yi is poet and independence activist Yi Yuksa, who is also an Andong native.

== Family ==
- Father: Yi Sik (12 September 1463 – 13 June 1502)
- Mother:
  - Biological: Lady Park of the Chuncheon Park clan (? – 1537)
  - Adoptive: Lady Kim of the Munso Kim clan

Wives and their issue(s):

1. Lady Heo of the Gimhae Heo clan (1502–1528)
  1. Yi Jun (1523–1583) – 1st son.
  2. Yi Chae (1527–1550) – 2nd son.
2. Lady Gwon of the Andong Gwon clan (1502–1547)
3. Unnamed concubine
  1. Yi Jeok – 3rd son.
4. Gisaeng Du-Hyang

== See also ==
- List of Korean philosophers
- Yi I
- Neo-Confucianism
