= Dosan Seowon =

UNESCO World Heritage Site in South Korea

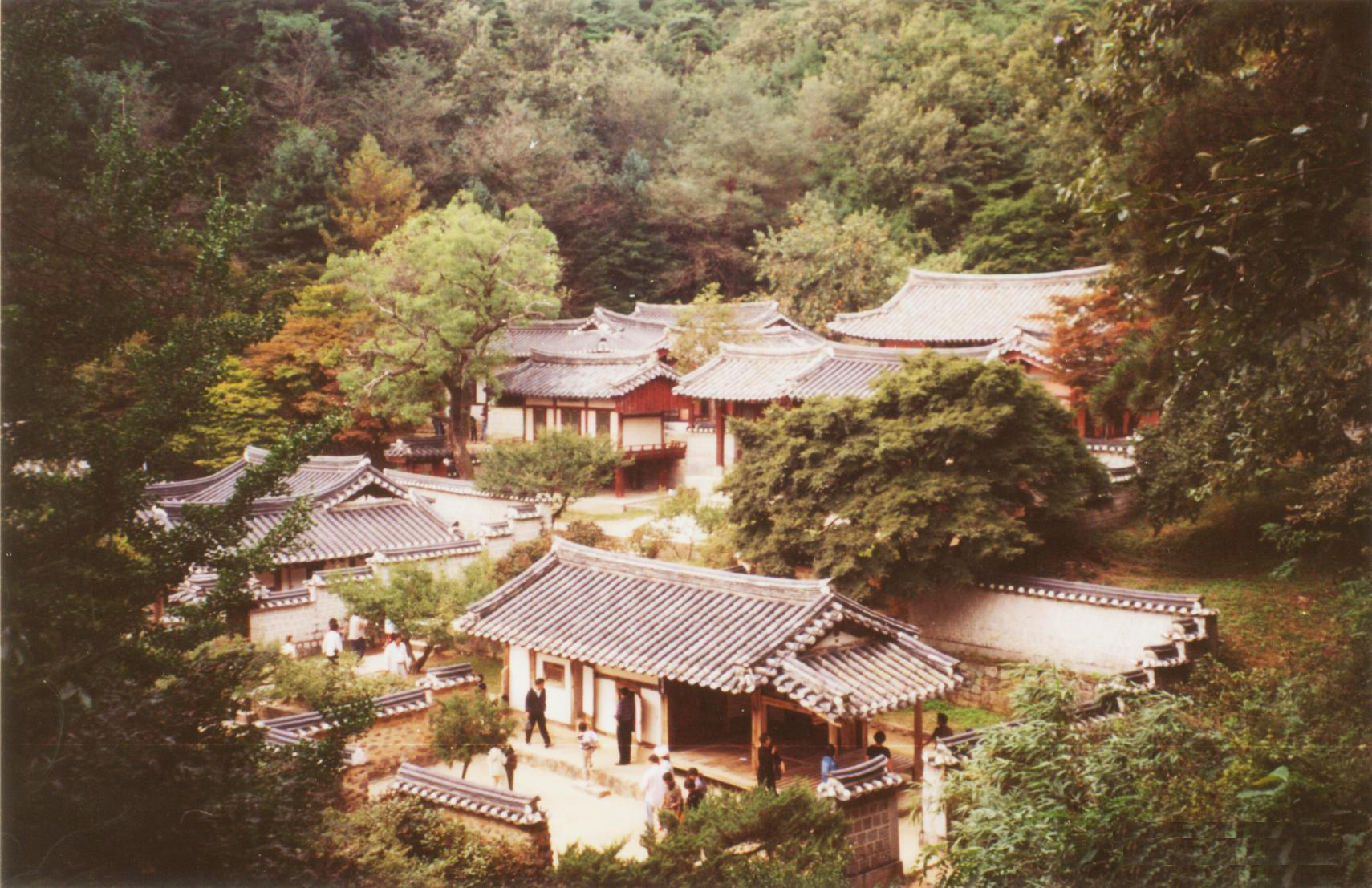
- Interactive map of the Dosan Seowon area

General information
- Location: South Korea
- Coordinates: 36°43′38″N 128°50′36″E

Design and construction
- Designations

UNESCO World Heritage Site
- Official name: Dosan-seowon
- Criteria: Cultural: (iii)
- Designated: 2019
- Part of: Seowon, Korean Neo-Confucian Academies
- Reference no.: 1498-004
- Area: 36.73 ha (90.8 acres)
- Buffer zone: 166.84 ha (412.3 acres)

Historic Sites of South Korea
- Official name: Dosanseowon Confucian Academy, Andong
- Designated: 1969-05-31
- Reference no.: 170

Korean name
- Hangul: 도산서원
- Hanja: 陶山書院
- RR: Dosan seowon
- MR: Tosan sŏwŏn

Dosan Seowon (Korean: 도산서원; Hanja: 陶山書院) was established in 1574 in what is present day Andong, South Korea, in memory of and four years after the death of Korean Confucian scholar Yi Hwang by some of his disciples and other Korean Confucian authorities. Yi Hwang had retired to the location in 1549 and begun construction on the facility, a private Korean Confucian academy offering instruction in the classics and honouring the sages with regular memorial rites.

Like other Korean Confucian academies, Dosan Seowon serves two purposes: education and commemoration. The site was well known in Korea as one of the leading academies and was home to the Toegye School of Thought for over 400 years. Although the educational function of the facility has long since ceased, the commemorative ceremonies have been and are still held twice a year.

The ancient academy received a royal charter in 1575 by King Seonjo and was featured on the reverse of the South Korean 1,000 won bill from 1975 to 2007 (BOK Series Designation Series II (나) 1983–2002).

== Construction ==
The Dosan Seowon complex consists of "Dosan Seodang" (lecture hall), which Toegye built and where he taught his students and where a tablet reading "Dosan Seowon", that was a gift from King Seonjo, still hangs, "Nongun Jeongsa," (dormitory for the students), and "Jeongyodang," (square lotus pond).

Dosan Seodang is composed of three parts; an exposed floor, a large room, and a kitchen. As Toegye was not wealthy, it took him four years to complete the construction of this building. A small signboard reading "Dosan Seowon", whose calligraphy Toegye he himself wrote, still hangings on one of the pillars at the end of Dosan Seodang.

Looking carefully at the Dosan Seodang floor, you will see an extension made of wooden planks. One of Toegye’s students, Jeonggu, recommended that Toegye extend the building's floor to accommodate more students. But although Toegye turned down Jeonggu's recommendation, Jeonggu and his fellow students hastily attached wooden planks to the floor while Toegye was out. Consequently, this part of the floor is not very elegant in construction and appearance (see Gallery photo below).

The garden is small but Toegye dug a small square pond called "Jeongudang" in the eastern part of the compound where he raised lotus flowers, and planted apricot trees in the western part. Toegye used to call apricots, bamboos, chrysanthemums, and pine trees his "friends", but he loved apricot trees most.

== Gallery ==
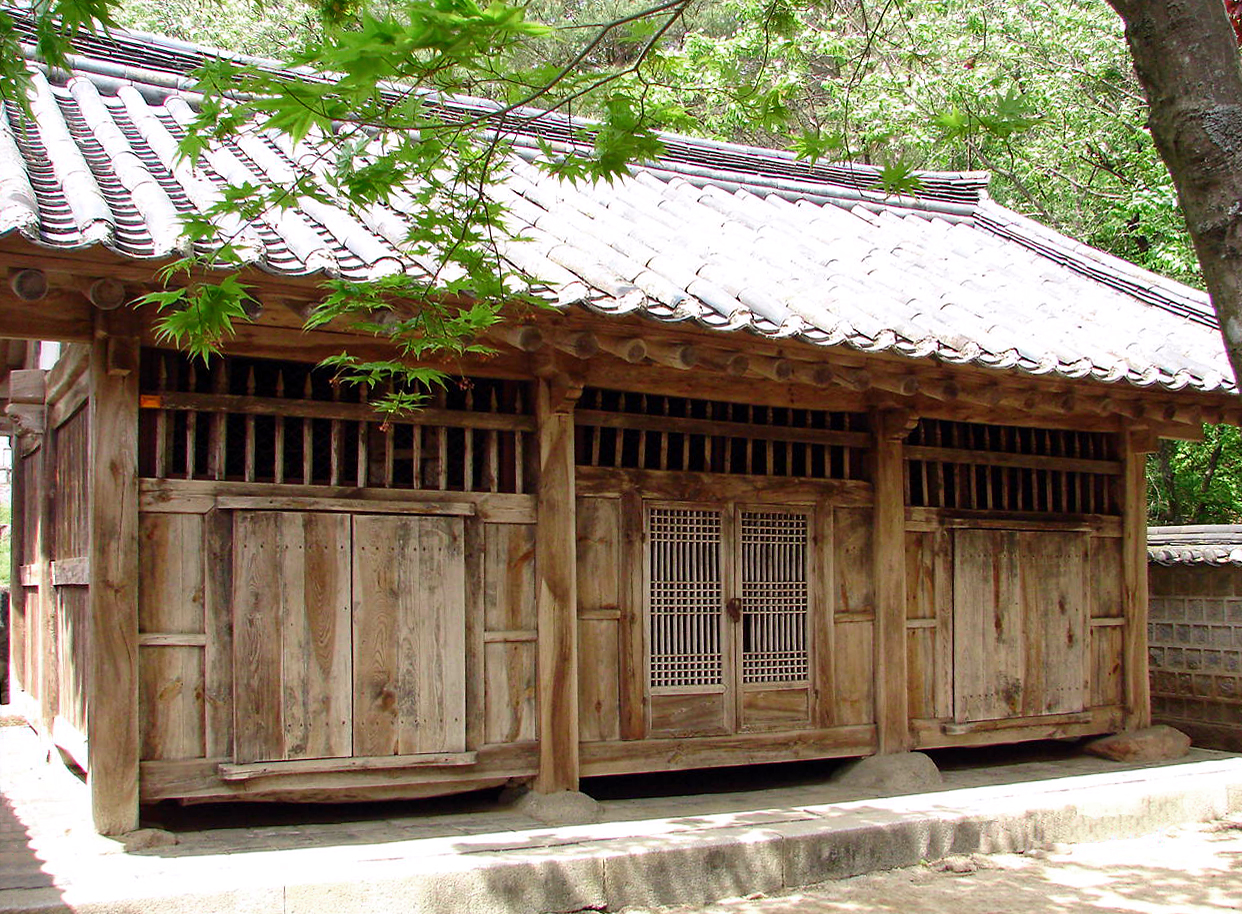
Jangpangak (publishing center) at Dosan Seowon, where woodblock prints of important texts were made.

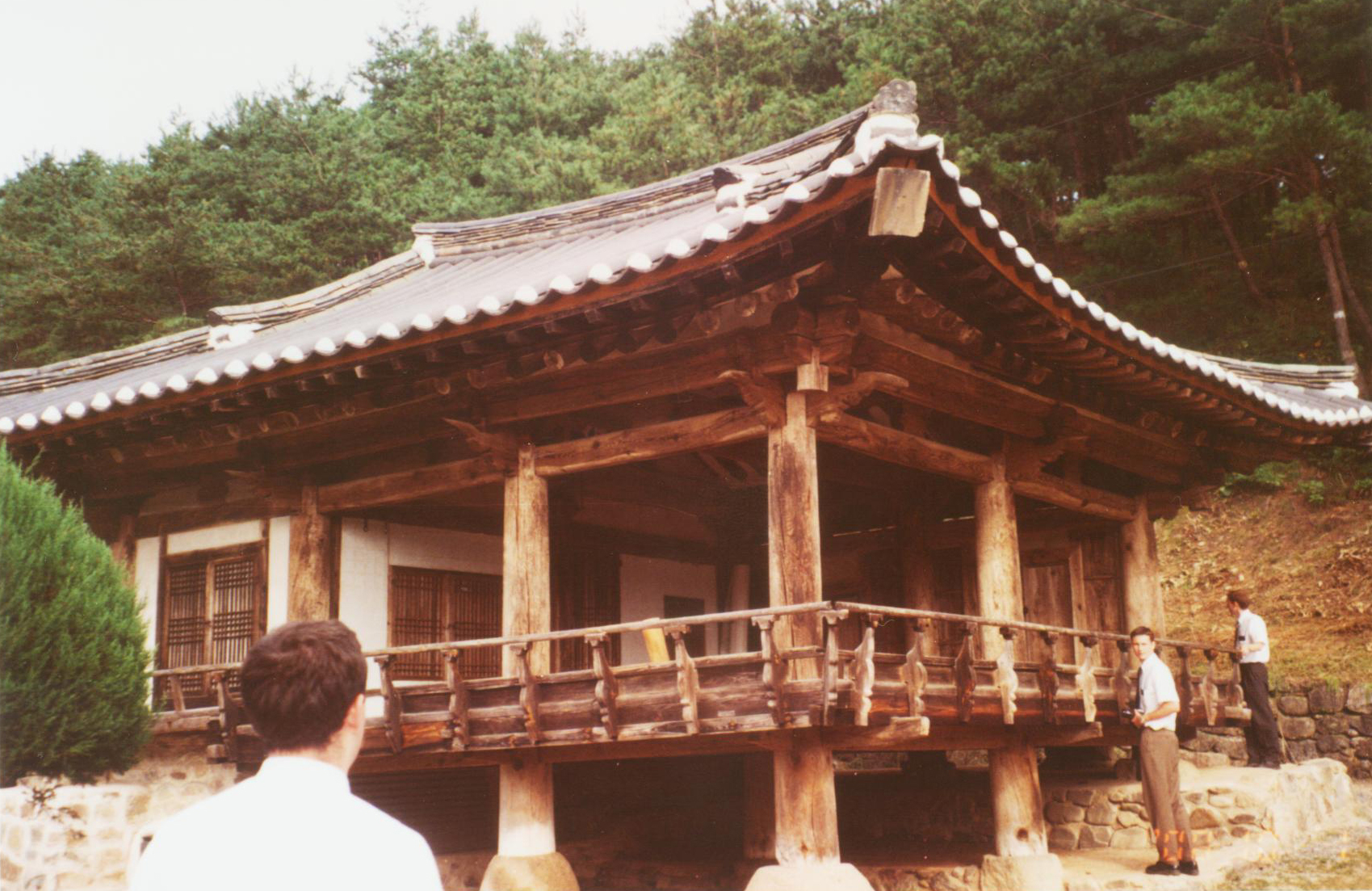
The library – raised to avoid humidity damage to the contents.

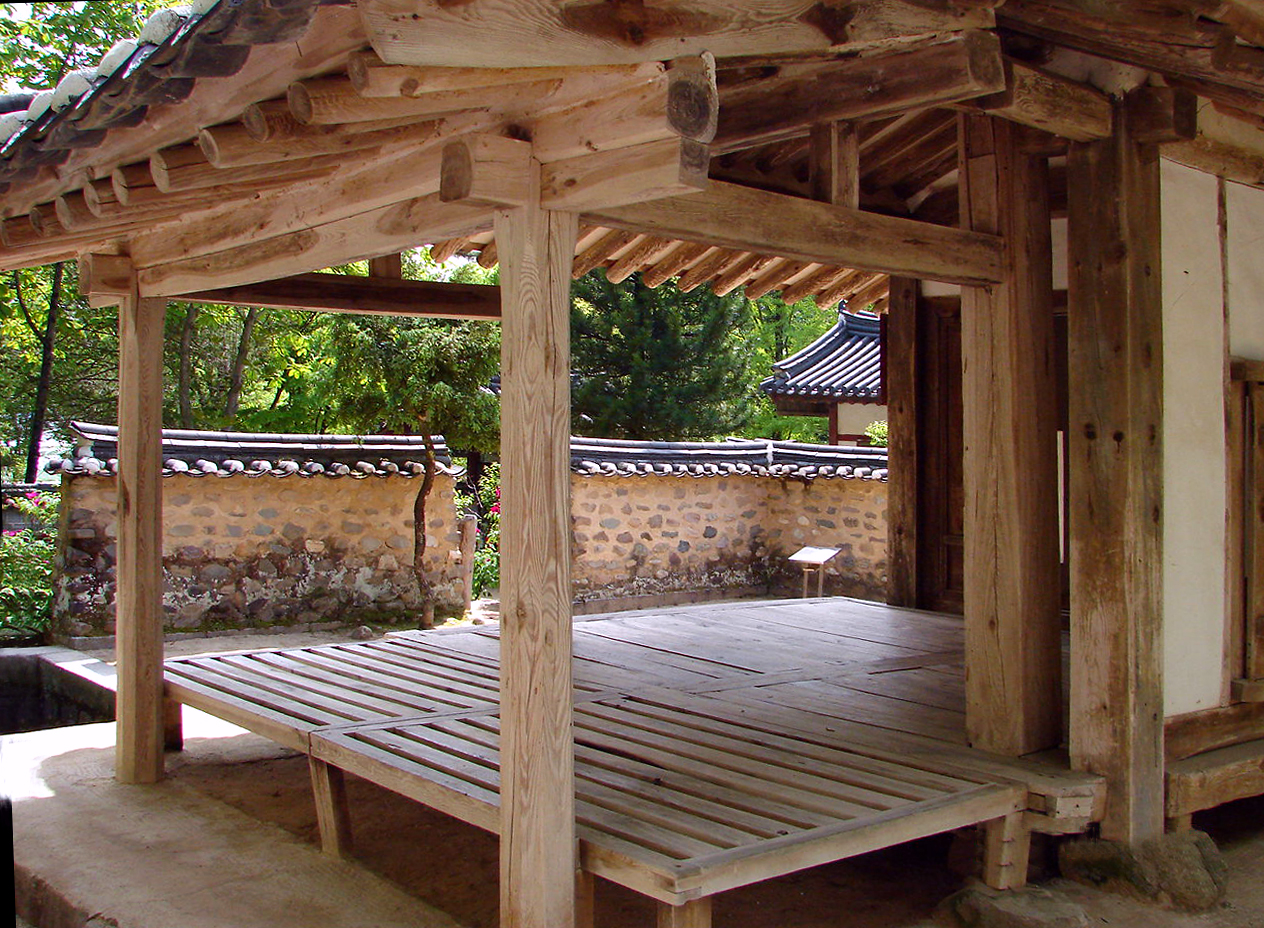
Dosan Seodang (lecture hall) featured on reverse of 1000 Won bill showing Jeonggu's hastily attached wooden planks

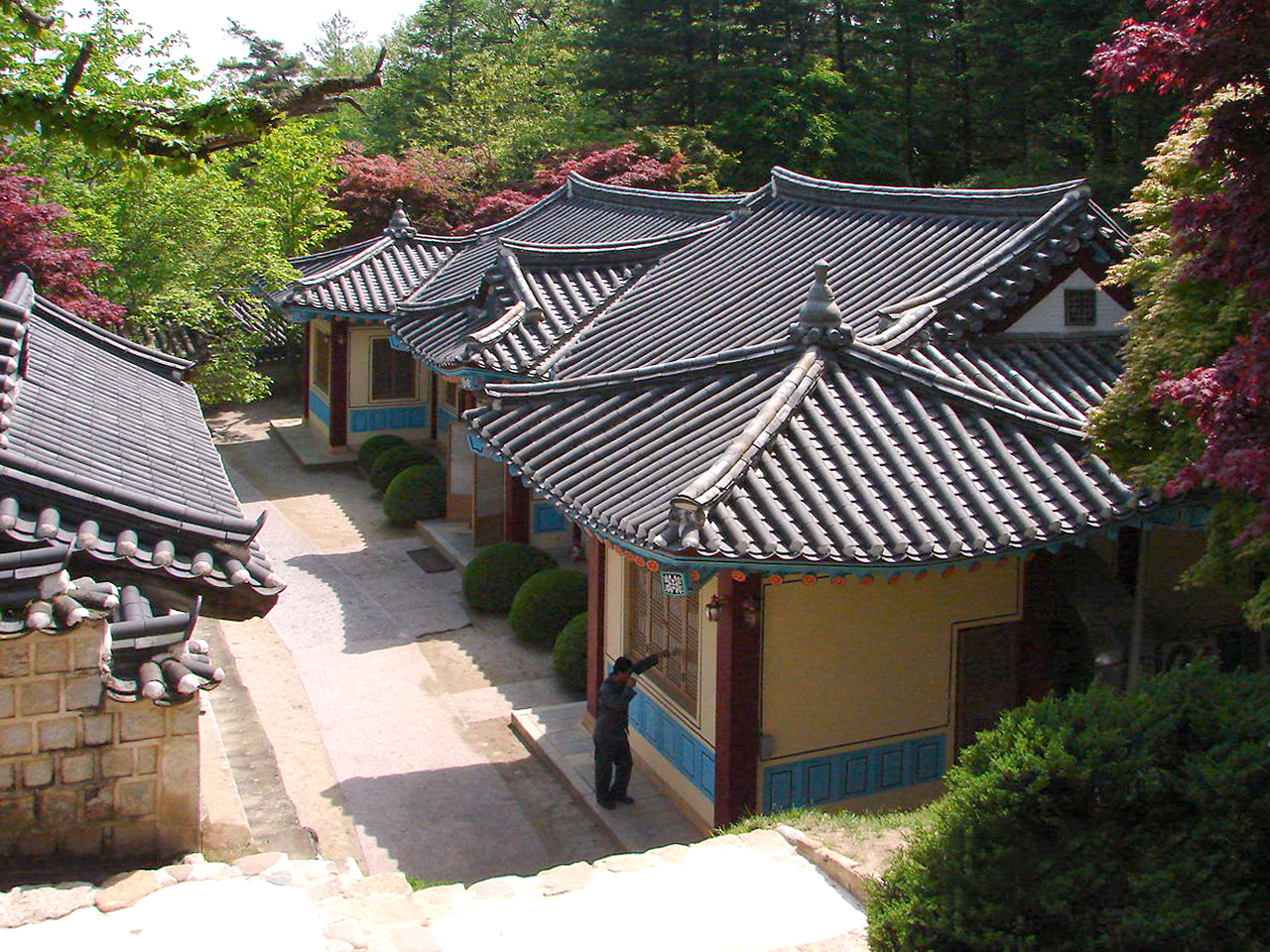
The modern museum building on the Dosan Seowon compound.

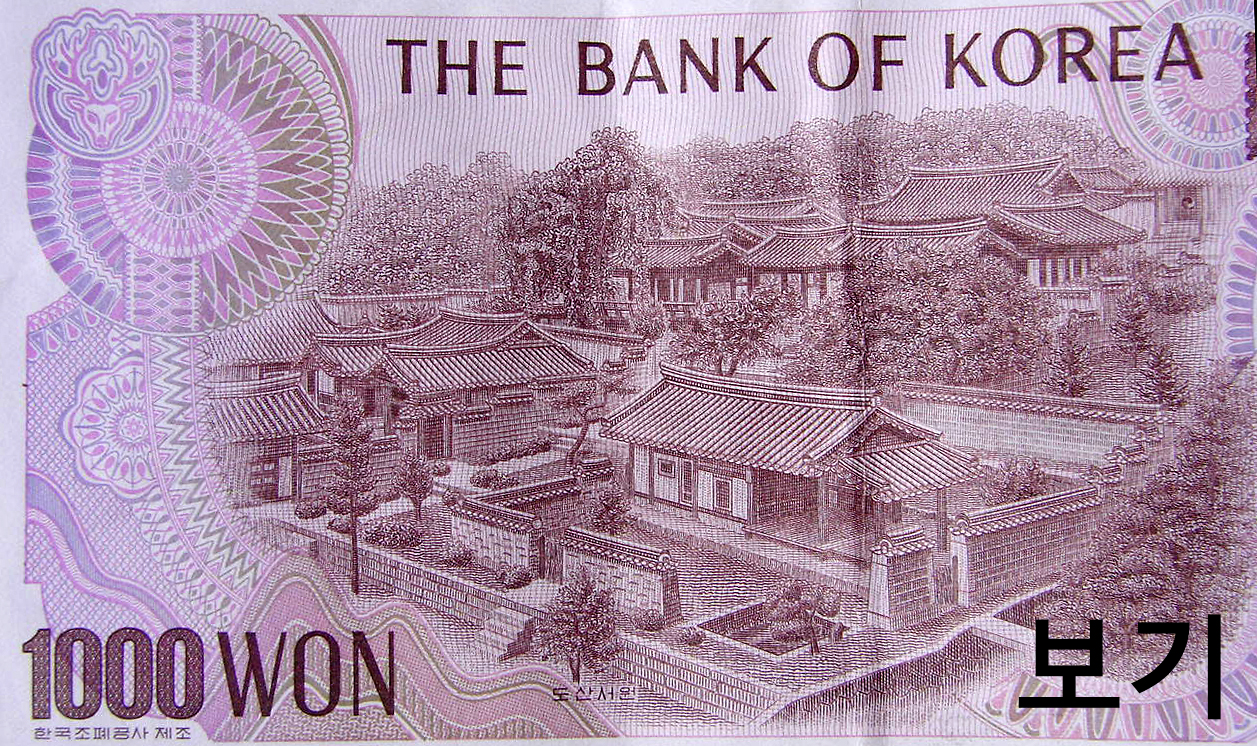
Dosan Seodang and Jeongyodang on the back of the 1000 Won note

== See also ==
- List of seowon
- Korean Confucianism
- Yi Hwang
- Won
- Tourism in South Korea
