= Hagwon =

South Korean private educational institutions

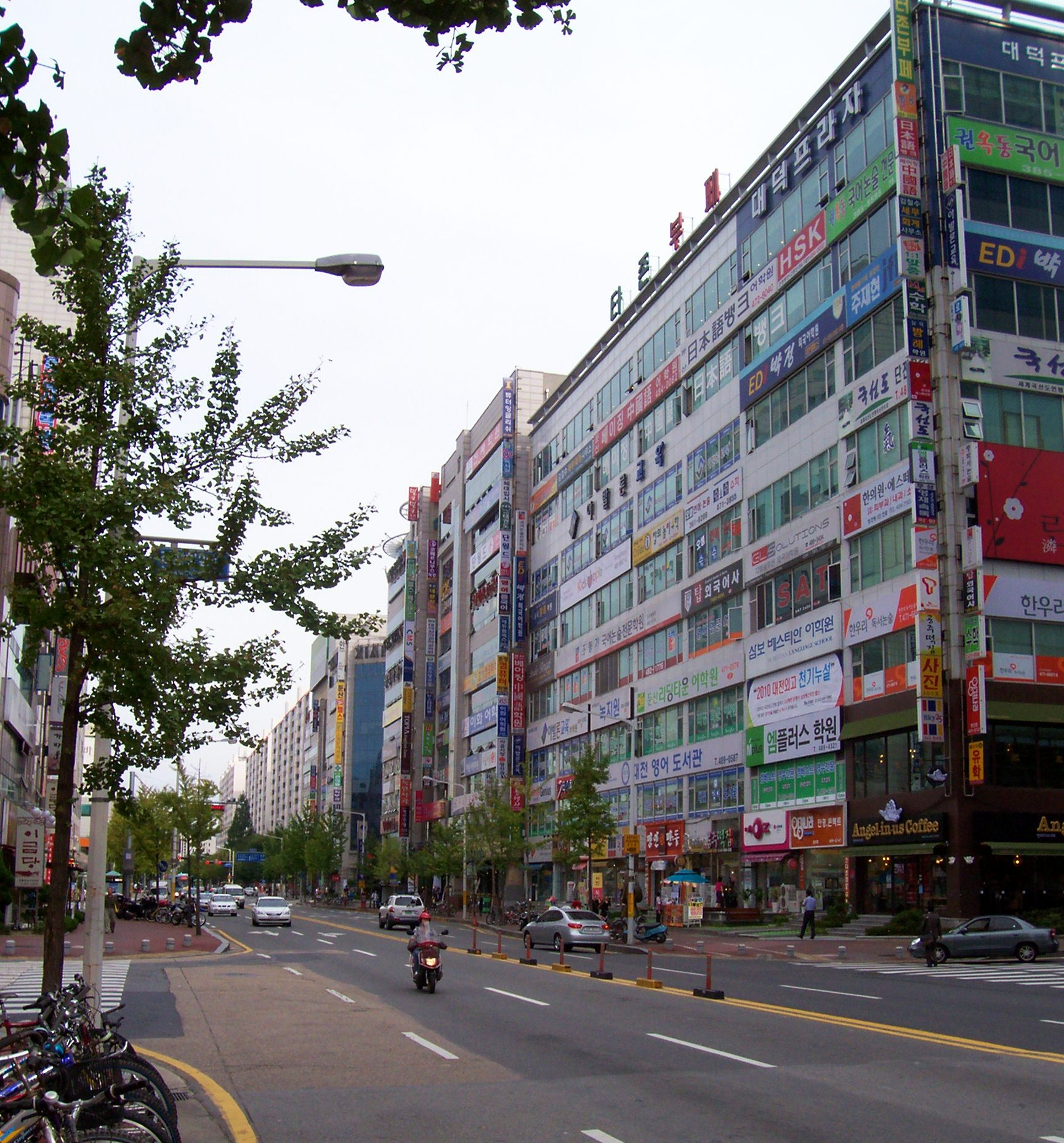
- A building containing numerous hagwons in Dunsan-dong, Daejeon

Korean name
- Hangul: 학원
- Hanja: 學院
- RR: hagwon
- MR: hagwŏn

Hagwon (Korean: 학원 [ha.ɡwʌn]) is a Korean term for a for-profit private educational institution. They are commonly likened to cram schools. Some consider hagwons as private language centers or academies operated like businesses apart from the South Korean public school system. As of 2022, 78.3% of grade school students in South Korea attend at least one and spend an average of 7.2 hours weekly in them.

Most children begin attending them by age five, with some even beginning by age two. The schools tend to focus on individual topics, including the English language, mathematics, and the college entrance exam, the College Scholastic Ability Test. Hagwons also exist for adults.

Hagwons have been a topic of controversy and criticism both internationally and in South Korea. They are seen as symptomatic of the significant competitiveness in South Korean society, and contribute to significant expense and stress for the majority of families who participate in them. Real estate prices are affected by proximity to elite hagwons, with homes located near these educational centers experiencing higher demand.

== Description ==
Hagwons are private educational institutions that are often compared to cram schools in the West. They teach a variety of subjects, for many purposes, to a variety of different age groups. As of 2020, South Korea had 73,865 hagwons.

=== Motivation ===
Competition for education and jobs in South Korea is widely considered to be extreme. Nearly 70% of students in South Korea participate in higher education, compared to 51% in the United States and 57% in the United Kingdom. This makes college admissions in South Korea, and especially the entrance examination (College Scholastic Ability Test), highly competitive. In 2023, it was reported that over half of test takers in the Gangnam and Seocho Districts retake the exam a year later because they were dissatisfied with their previous scores.

=== Demographics ===
A significant majority of South Korean children begin attending hagwons by the age of five; it was reported in 2017 that 83% of five year olds attended at least one. A minority of students begin at age two. In 2022, it was reported that 78.3% of students between the first to twelfth grade attended at least one and spent an average of 7.2 hours in hagwons per week. Attendance of and time spent in hagwon is higher for elementary and middle school students.

Some students attend until late at night. A number of hagwons offer private bus or shuttle services to bring the children back home, although the safety of these services due to cost minimization efforts has been criticized.

=== Subjects ===
Parents spend the most money on English language hagwons, with mathematics and Korean taking second and third place. Science and the humanities are also popular, although less so. Hagwons are also seen as a critical place to prepare for the college entrance exams.

While most hagwons focus on meeting educational needs, many also exist for a variety of nonacademic subjects, including music, art, swimming, and Taekwondo. A variety of hagwons for adults also exist, including some to train flight attendants.

== History and regulations ==
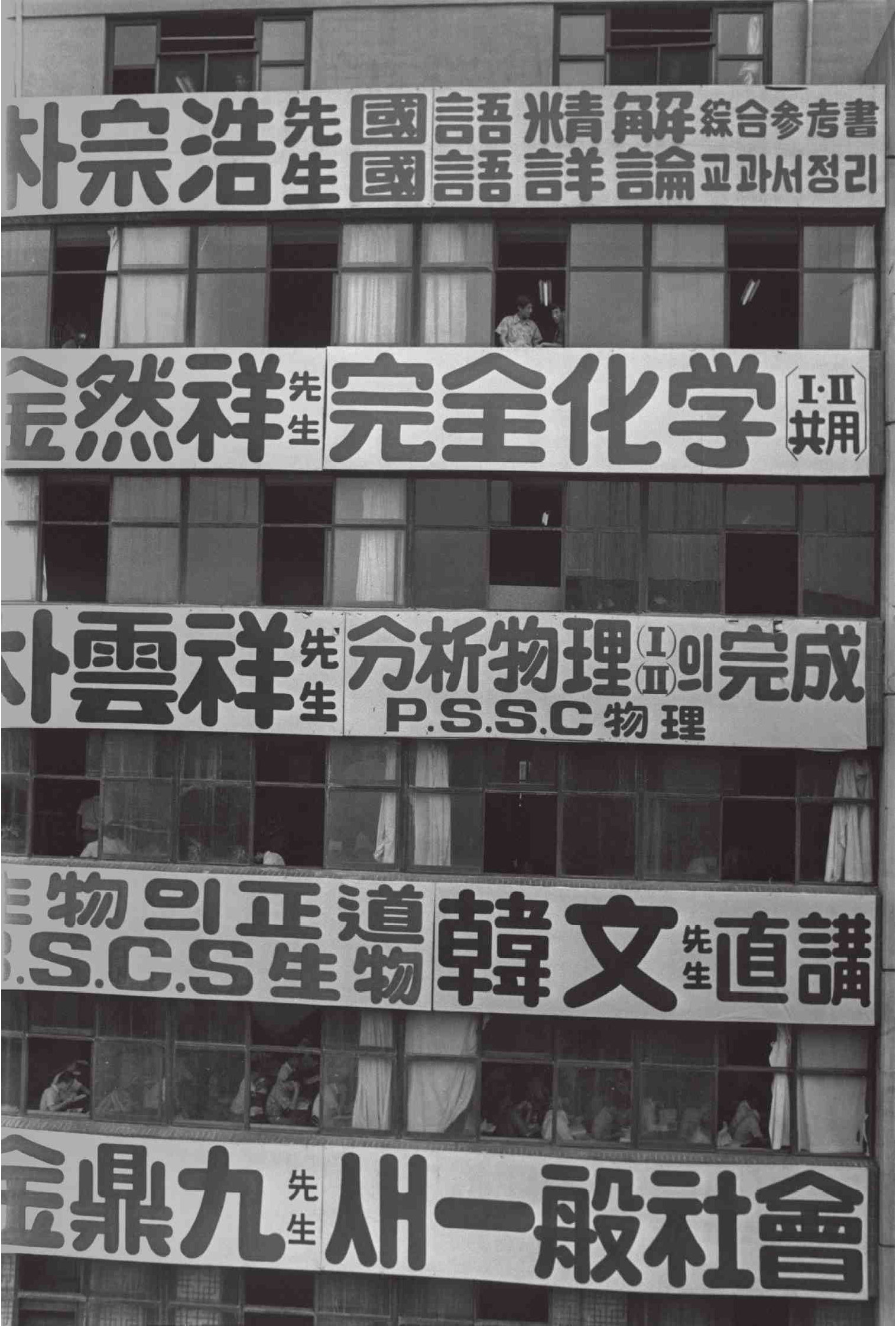
Signs advertising hagwons in the Jongno District of Seoul (1971)

In 1885, Henry Appenzeller founded the Paichai school (배재대학교) as a cover for his missionary work. At the time it was illegal to preach other religions in Korea. Although his main goal was to spread his faith, it was still used by Koreans to learn English.

In the 1970s and 1980s, hagwons were reportedly seen as optional for remedial studying. Private education, known as gwaoe (과외), was banned by President Chun Doo-hwan in 1980. It was felt the advantage of private education unfairly burdened the poor and to promote equality, all access to it was made illegal. Through the years the government has relaxed the restrictions on private education by increasingly allowing more individuals and organizations to offer private education until the ban was ruled unconstitutional in the 1990s.

Korean courts have ruled that it may violate the constitution for the government to limit the amount of money hagwons can charge. In early 2008, the Seoul government was working on changes to the regulations to allow hagwons to set their own hours, citing individual choice as trumping regulation. However, the government reversed its position five days later. The regulations were criticized as ineffective because the city council possessed limited resources to monitor and enforce them.

Along with these restrictions, hagwons had to disclose their tuition amounts to the government so people could complain if the schools attempted to raise the tuition. The licenses of hagwons caught running false advertisements will be revoked. Hagwons are required to issue cash receipts. In July 2009, to help catch violators of these new regulations, the government started a program to reward people who reported them.

The regulations were intended to reduce the cost of private education. However, some hagwons added weekend classes to compensate for shorter weekday classes. Other parents have sought out private tutors to make up for lost study time. Other hagwons simply ignored the regulations. It was reported in April 2009 that 67 percent of hagwons sampled were found to have overcharged for tuition. Forty percent were found to have charged parents over two times the registered tuition amount.

In March 2008, the government prohibited school teachers from creating test questions for hagwons. It had been found that some teachers were leaking tests and test questions to hagwons, giving the students who attended those schools advantages when it came time to take the test.

A petition was made in October 2009 by parents, teachers, students and hagwon owners to challenge the government's legislation regarding hagwon closing times in Seoul and Busan. The constitutional court ruled that the laws did not violate the constitution. The restriction was put in place for Seoul and Busan in the summer of 2009. In making the ruling the court said, "Because it's important to secure sleep for high school students to overcome fatigue and for the sake of their growth, it's difficult to say that [the ban] excessively restricts basic rights."

In April 2010 it was reported that there were over 25,000 hagwons registered with the Seoul Metropolitan Office of Education, with nearly 6,000 being in the Gangnam area. It was also revealed that local government councils other than Seoul had decided not to implement the 22:00 curfew. The curfew was seen as not having an impact on education fees and not addressing the real concern with private education. Despite the curfew, there have been attempts to get around this curfew among hagwons in Seoul.

== Controversy ==
Teaching as a whole in South Korea is essential, especially for the rigorous and fast-paced curriculum. There have been recorded cases of teachers' behavior regarding academic discrimination and ignoring students' learning process and effects. Hagwons not only impact students but parents and teachers as well. In 2022, a mother was so concerned about her son not having enough time to study that she advertised for someone to sit with her son at a study cafe and to wake him up anytime he fell asleep studying. In an article by Suzy Gardner, she interviewed a previous hagwon educator and was told that though her job was to teach English, she "illegally" taught ballet because the hagwon she worked at didn't have enough employees to support all of the classes that they offered. The individual also said that they were so understaffed that they had to watch over at least three rooms at once, with one room containing students aged four.

=== Cost and economics ===
Despite South Korea's now decreasing population and lowest fertility rate in the world, spending on education has only grown. In 2022, Koreans spent ₩26 trillion (US$19.4 billion) on private education, at an average of ₩410,000 (US$305.91) per month. Becoming the most expensive country in the world to raise a child, which sparked many concerns for the South Korean economy, according to Time magazine.

While some see hagwons as filling a need not being adequately met by the public school system, others see them as creating an unequal footing between the poor and rich in Korea. Although most Korean children attend hagwon, according to CNN, studies have still shown a measurable difference in educational outcomes based on the income of the parents.

Efforts are now being made to try and curb the amount of private spending on hagwons, although some observers are skeptical that they will be successful. The Korean government has even provided 150 million won ($125,000) to each of the 400 schools that were selected nationwide to refurbish after-school programs and other classes. The Ministry of Education states that the 60-billion won project is expected to halve the private education costs for middle or even lower-income families. Some even stated that the use of hagwons won't be required as the curriculum will be revised. Headmasters would be provided the authority to hire additional educational professionals.

=== Academic elitism ===
Research shows hagwons are associated with South Korea's pervasive academic elitism and educational inequity due to their provision of supplementary education. Many students rely heavily on hagwons to improve their grades and to perform well on the College Scholastic Ability Test, which determines whether or not a student will be able to apply to certain universities. A 2023 statistics indicate a notable increase in hagwon spending, disproportionately benefiting students from wealthier or geographically advantageous backgrounds. Daechi-dong, a neighborhood in Gangnam District, Seoul, which is known for its heavily concentrated wealth and high standard of living, is dubbed the "mecca of private education" in South Korea. According to a report released on March 7, 2023, by the Ministry of Education and Statistics Korea based on data collected from January 2022 to December 2022, the monthly average expenditures on hagwons and other private education for households at the bottom of the five-tier, income-based categorization with children aged 13–18, were \482,000 – only slightly higher than the 481,000 won these families spent on food. Research shows that there is extremely high demand for private education in a highly competitive academic environment, contributing to educational inequality. Data reveals a significant representation of students from high-income districts like Gangnam-gu and Seocho in these universities and that the matriculation rate at SKY Universities was inversely proportional to students' household income – students from lower-income households matriculated at lower rates. The influence of hagwons on South Korea's education system is also a common theme in media. In "SKY Castle", the plot centers on upper-class families destroying each other's lives by committing identity fraud, murder, and suicide in order to send their children to the top universities and secure lucrative career paths.

=== Health impact ===
The hagwon culture is widely viewed as extreme by both international and domestic observers. A number of experts have expressed concerns about the mental health impact on especially the younger attendees, and even on the parents who have to afford and carefully curate their children's education in order to have them be competitive. In 2017, it was reported that among OECD countries, South Korea had the highest suicide rate in the world. This pressure on mental health is not only felt by the students but also by their parents, who often face the financial and emotional burden of ensuring their children's success in an extremely competitive educational environment. Some hagwons use "anxiety marketing" using phrases such as, "If not now, then when?" to evoke a sense of urgency amongst parents of students. In addition to mental health issues, there are also concerns about physical health implications due to the long hours spent in hagwons. According to a 2015 New York Times report, the average South Korean student works up to 13 hours a day, which is more than half of the day, leaving only 5.5 hours of sleep at night. Research shows that a lifestyle of lack of sleep can lead to problems such as chronic fatigue, poor sleep quality, and an increased risk of physical health problems in the long term. As an effort to combat these issues, in 2010, the South Korean government implemented regulations to limit the operating hours of hagwons and reduce the academic burden on students.

=== Impact on real estate ===
A higher-than-average concentration of hagwons in the Gangnam District, specifically Daechi-dong (대치동), has been cited as the primary reason for an increase in real estate costs in the area. In the 1970s the Seoul government made some top schools relocate to the area. The schools there have become associated with entry into elite high schools and then elite universities. Many residents feel their children need to be associated with these schools to reach the upper levels of business and success.

As more parents try to move to the area to allow their children to attend these schools, the prices of real estate in the area have risen to 300 percent of similar areas in Seoul. In 2003 the government had planned to develop a hagwon center in Pangyo to relieve some of the pressure on Gangnam, yet after heavy criticism for only shifting the problem around and not solving it, the government canceled the plan only a couple of weeks later.

=== Competitiveness ===
Top-rated hagwon slots are fought over by parents. Parents will stand outside all day to register and enroll students in top hagwons. Some believe that there is a disadvantage for low-income families as many of them cannot afford the costs of hagwons. Typically, financial assistance provides an education that helps differentiate one's value, this is where socioeconomic groups cause inequity in competition. Because of this gap, many students fight to find ways to "stand out" to compensate for not receiving the same level of education or opportunity.

== English-language instructors ==
Native English speakers were hired as early as 1883 in Korea, originally out of need. The first teacher hired at the government-run Tongmunhak was Thomas Hallifax. Due to the preference for having native English speakers teach English, many native English-speakers are still hired to teach at hagwons in Korea. These hagwons may be only English schools or they may also be schools which offer a variety of subjects including English.

The minimum requirements for foreigners for such teaching positions are: citizenship of Australia, Canada, Ireland, New Zealand, South Africa, the United Kingdom, or the United States, a clean criminal background check at the national level, and a bachelor's degree obtained in one of the aforementioned countries.

In return for signing a one-year contract, the institute provides an instructor with a monthly salary, round-trip airfare from his or her country of origin, usually a rent-free apartment or housing stipend for the duration of the instructor's contract, a pension pay for some citizens, and an additional one-month "severance pay" at the completion of the contract.

Foreign instructors hold a mixed view of hagwons. Some have complained of poor housing, non-payment, disagreements, and getting fired on the 11th month before they receive severance pay; however, many instructors have had no significant issues with the hagwon they have worked at. Some recommend looking at hagwon blacklists or greenlists, but others say they are not necessarily reliable.

Hagwon owners have complained about the challenge in finding truly qualified teachers. A group of English instructors first formed a labour union at a hagwon in 2005.

== Hagwons abroad ==
In some English-speaking countries, hagwons exist for ethnic Koreans. In North America, about 75% of Korean-language supplemental schools have affiliation with churches. As of 2006, of the hagwons registered with the Korean School Association of America (KSAA), over 75% were affiliated with Korean churches. There are also secular formal hagwons and secular informal hagwons. The hagwons are equivalent to hoshū jugyō kō (hoshūkō) in ethnic Japanese communities and buxiban in ethnic Chinese communities. As of 2010, every year over 50,000 Korean Americans attend Korean heritage schools.

Korean schools were first established in Hawaii after 1903, when the first wave of Korean immigration came to the United States. The modern generation of Korean supplemental schools were first established in the United States in the 1970s. At the time they were weekend schools that had a mission to preserve the Korean-American identity in its students. They taught the Korean language, managed the assimilation of Korean-American children, and offered afterschool tutoring programs. There were almost 500 schools registered with the KSAA by the end of the 1980s. Beginning in the 1990s there were also hagwons that were supplementary academic preparation programs like the ones in Korea. Despite this, some parents viewed the quality of American hagwons as less rigorous than their South Korean counterparts. But in 2010, it was reported that some Korean parents in the United States viewed some hagwons in the New Jersey–New York area as being of similar quality.

Kang Hee-Ryong, author of the PhD thesis White supremacy, racialization, and cultural politics of Korean Heritage Language Schools, wrote that the Korean heritage schools are "not simply a means of counter hegemony against the racializing forces" but instead the "product of compromises" between different generations of Korean Americans.

== In popular culture ==
- Episode 9 (The Pied piper 피리부는 사나이) in Extraordinary Attorney Woo (2022 South Korean TV series)
- Crazy Love (2022 South Korean TV series)
- Crash Course in Romance (2023 South Korean TV series)
- The Midnight Romance in Hagwon (2024 South Korean TV series)

== See also ==
- Education in South Korea
- Work–life balance in South Korea
- Ronin (student)
- Storefront school
