= Korean Council for University Education =

Organization in the Republic of Korea

- Abbreviation: KCUE
- Formation: April 1982
- Type: Association of university presidents
- Purpose: Post-secondary education
- Headquarters: Seoul, South Korea
- Region served: South Korea
- Members: Presidents of all (198) South Korean universities
- Chairwoman Secretary-General: Won-hwa Hong Chong Yul Park
- Main organ: General Assembly
- Website: http://english.kcue.or.kr

- Korean Council for University Education
- Hangul: 한국대학교육협의회
- Hanja: 韓國大學敎育協議會
- RR: Hanguk daehak gyoyuk hyeobuihoe
- MR: Han'guk taehak kyoyuk hyŏbŭihoe

The Korean Council for University Education (KCUE; Korean: 한국대학교육협의회) is a private association of four-year higher educational institutions in South Korea intended to promote cooperation between universities and represent their interests, particularly regarding university autonomy from state regulation, to the government. It is comparable in some respects to organizations such as the Association of American Colleges and Universities (AAC&U), the German Rectors’ Conference (HRK), or the Japan Association of National Universities (JANU). The KCUE is unique, however, in that the presidents of all South Korean universities, public and private, are required by law to hold membership.

== History ==
The KCUE was founded in 1982 and legally consolidated in 1984 during the later period of authoritarian rule in South Korea. It was largely intended to placate growing demands from universities for greater autonomy from a centralized education system that was strictly regulated by the Ministry of Education. During the first several years of its existence, however, the KCUE had little semblance of autonomy from or influence over the authoritarian government at the time and was able to achieve few of its objectives.

With the beginning of substantial democratization in South Korea in 1987-1988 and the subsequent, gradual liberalization of the higher education system, the KCUE was increasingly able to accomplish its original purposes and expand its functions, particularly in research and training of university staff. By the mid-1990s it had taken on significant responsibilities related to university evaluations and the university admissions system previously under the exclusive purview of the Ministry of Education.

== Organization ==
The KCUE is nominally controlled by a General Assembly composed of the presidents of all member universities. The General Assembly elects a ten to twenty-member Board of Trustees and a Chairman (currently Kyungpook National University President Won-hwa Hong) that make most executive decisions. The Board of Trustees elects a Secretary-General (currently Kyungpook National University Professor Chong Yul Park) that oversees day-to-day operations of the KCUE. The organization's activities are mainly funded by the Ministry of Education and mandatory membership fees from universities.

== Functions ==
The main purposes of the KCUE are to support the development of South Korea’s higher education system by “promoting inter-institutional cooperation concerning major issues common to four-year universities and colleges” and represent the collective voice of universities to the government to “increase the autonomy, initiative, public accountability, and overall quality” of higher education.

=== Research ===
The KCUE’s Research Institute for Higher Education, formally established in 1985, conducts research as commissioned by its member universities or the government. It focuses on research regarding the management and administration of universities, policy options for reform in South Korea’s university admissions system, financial support of universities from private and governmental sources, and the development of university curricula and teaching methods. The Institute's research is published, among other places, in the Korean-language journal Daehak Gyoyuk (Higher Education) .

=== University Faculty/Staff Training ===
See also :Membership Training in Korea

In order to improve the quality of leadership, instruction, and administration at member universities, the KCUE's Training Center for Higher Education, formally established in 1995 in a separate facility in Daegu, South Korea, trains approximately 2,500 university administrators, faculty, and staff annually in areas of greatest need as requested by universities. The Center uses training seminars, conferences, and programs to disseminate updated research information on university education and administration from the KCUE and other organizations.

=== University Admissions ===
Since the mid-1990s the Ministry of Education has gradually delegated much of its authority over the country's admissions process to the KCUE. In late 2004, it announced that the KCUE would decide admissions schedules and develop admissions rules. More significantly, the transition team of incoming South Korean President Lee Myung-bak announced in January 2008 its intention to transfer most responsibilities regarding the university admissions system from the Ministry of Education to the KCUE, which would thus allow universities to decide admission criteria, such as whether to include interviews in admissions processes and how to weight the College Scholastic Ability Test in admissions decisions. Lee had made a promise during the 2007 presidential campaign to give universities greater autonomy.

=== University Evaluations ===
In addition to conducting research on accreditation and evaluation in higher education, the KCUE is one of the few formal, albeit voluntary mechanisms of evaluation or accreditation in the South Korean higher education system. It began conducting simple evaluations of its member universities in 1983 and more detailed evaluations beginning in 1994 that included separate assessments at the departmental and institutional level.

=== Academic Records Verification ===
In response to the widely reported scandals in late 2007 involving well-known university professors, government officials, and television personalities in South Korea that had forged academic credentials from both domestic and international universities, the KCUE established its Academic Records Verification Service in September 2007. It currently processes verification requests from any South Korea-based organization to confirm the domestic or international academic credentials of South Korean citizens or foreigners seeking employment at a business, admission to a school, etc. Concerns regarding forged credentials were so widespread that the service received over 500 requests on the first day, and over 10,000 applications were filed within the first ten weeks. The South Korean Ministry of Justice currently uses the KCUE to verify the credentials of all E-2 visa applicants seeking to teach foreign languages such as English in the country.

== See also ==
- Education in South Korea
- List of colleges and universities
- List of universities in Seoul
- National universities in South Korea
