= College admissions in South Korea =

The South Korean college entrance system requires all graduating high school students (or those with equivalent academic standing) to take an entrance exam called the College Scholastic Ability Test which takes place once every year. Admission to universities in South Korea is heavily dependent on applicants' test scores and grades.

== Criteria for admission ==
In Korea, the following factors are mainly reflected in college entrance exams:

=== College Scholastic Ability Test ===
Commonly called the CSAT or in Korean, Suneung, the College Scholastic Ability Test, is the most common national-level entrance exam in South Korea, taking place once every year.

=== Student records ===
Also called school records or academic reports, these outline high school students' grades and other accomplishments. Each report is divided into a "curricular" section, which records grades earned in academic subjects, as well as an "extracurricular" section, which records information like volunteer work, certificates of achievement, and awards.

==== Comparative school records ====
Comparative school records are assigned to students who graduated from high school for a certain period (the year of graduation varies depending on the university) or to students who have passed the qualification exam, in which they have no school record itself, the grades they have received on the College Scholastic Ability or essay tests, are reported graded in terms of college scholastic ability test scores or essay scores.

=== University examination ===
As a self-evaluation test conducted by the universities themselves, the self-evaluation test consists of mainly essay tests, along with various evaluation methods, such as oral interviews, major aptitude tests, and practical skills offered for each university, in order to ensure fair opportunities for each student. Recently, the number of Admission Officers in Systems has been increasing in bolding measures to reshape the test-oriented admissions process. Some of these measures include viewing potential, evaluating extra-curricular activities, and considering recommendations from principals and teachers that can further enhance their academic abilities.

== History ==
=== Prior to the achievement test ===
From 1946 to 1953, the independent examination system for each university was implemented. Each university would conduct its own tests to select students. In 1954, the Combined College Entrance Exam was conducted, and only the students who passed could take the independent examination system for each university. From 1955 to 1961, the previous system was reinitiated. From 1962 to 1963, only students who passed the college entrance qualification examination system could take the university independent exam, similar to the 1954 Combined College Entrance Exam. From 1964 to 1968, the independent examination system was reinitiated by universities. From 1969 to 1981, only students who passed the preliminary examination and the main exam were allowed to go to college, except in 1981 when the main exam was abolished.

=== The achievement test ===
From 1982 to 1993, students were selected through the achievement test and university examination. Up until 1987, students were to take the achievement test in order to understand the academic standard of students through their scores, along with adding this score during their application process to universities. Starting in 1988, students were to apply for each university, one at a time, during the first and second semesters of admission periods, and then took the tests provided by the universities they applied for. This process is also referred to as the "apply first, test later" system.

Suri high school, 2013 College Scholastic Ability Test

=== College Scholastic Ability Test ===
From 1994, the recruitment unit was changed to Ga, Na, and Da-category (in the past, there was also the La-category) according to the entrance examination period. The achievement test was abolished and the College Scholastic Ability Test (CSAT) was conducted. In the 1994 college entrance exam, both the College Scholastic Ability Test and the university examination were held. The College Scholastic Ability Test, is usually held on the first Thursday of November and takes place for about eight hours, excluding a one-hour lunch and break time. Throughout the test, students are required to complete six sections: National Language (Korean), English, Mathematics, Korean History, Social Studies or Science or Vocational Education, and a Second Foreign Language (Chinese, Classical Chinese, Japanese, Vietnamese, Spanish, Russian, or Arabic). The mathematics section is further divided into two types, namely Ga and Na. Ga is typically preferred by students who are studying natural science, while Na is more suited for students studying humanities. Despite this, most students tend to choose Ga for the CSAT as it covers topics that are taught in high school. Students are also given the option to choose their subordinate subjects from a selection of Science subjects such as Physics, Biology, Chemistry, Earth Science, Social Studies subjects such as Ethics, Geography, History, Political Science, or Vocational Education subjects such as Engineering, Commerce, Oceanography, Agricultural Science, or Home Economics. Later, essay tests or interviews were taken from 1997 to the present day under the government's policy of "banning the main exam," and they are scored and reflected in the entrance examination. It is referred to as the "test first, apply later" system, also known as the "pre-exam, post-support system", in comparison to the previous college entrance system.

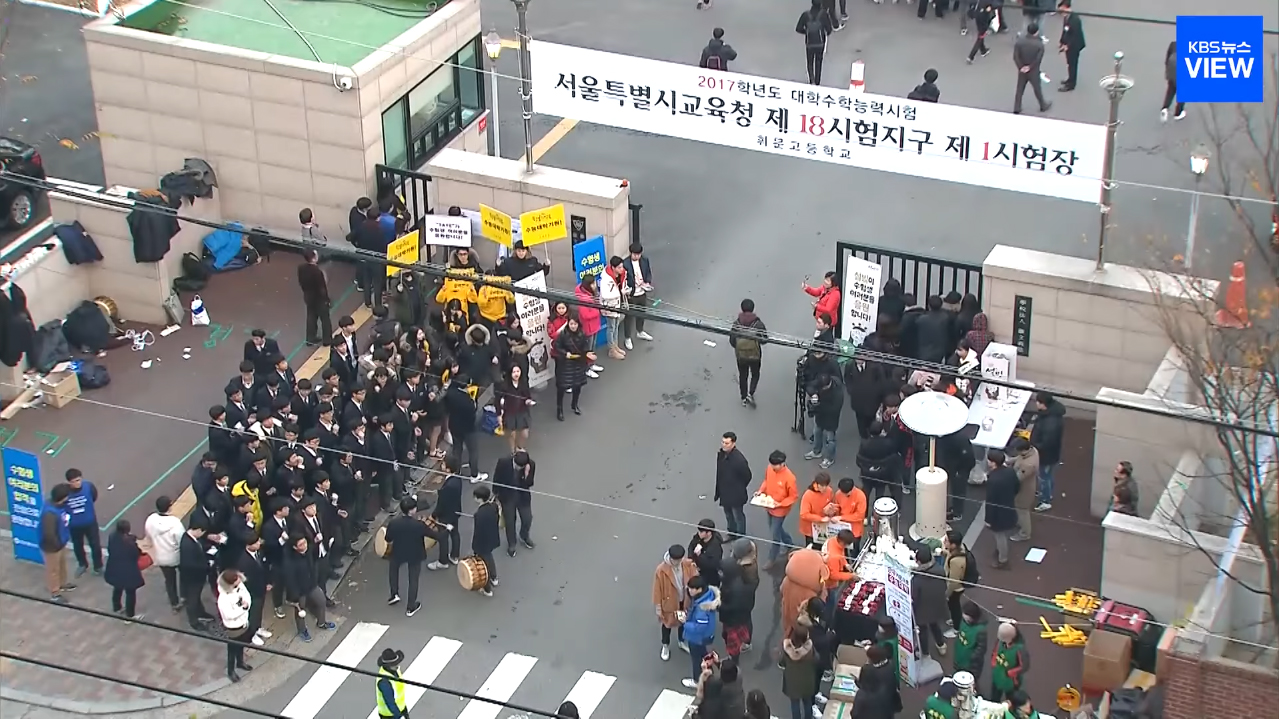
Cheer for the 2016 College Scholastic Ability Test (CSAT) test takers

== Recruitment method ==
=== Early admission ===
Early admission began in 1997 when the main exam was abolished. It is largely divided into the first and second rounds, with the first being conducted before the College Scholastic Ability Test and the second being after the College Scholastic Ability Test. If necessary, a third round of recruitment may be conducted. In early admission, the importance of the College Scholastic Ability Test is lowered, and the contents of the university examination or student record has a more significant impact in selecting students.

Initially, the recruitment was divided into the first semester and the second semester. In the 2010 school year, recruitment for the first semester of early admission was abolished, and since then, universities only recruit students for the second semester of early admission.

In early admission, the scores of the College Scholastic Ability Test are not considered, because the early admission process is conducted before the exam is administered. However, most universities use the grade scores of the College Scholastic Ability Test to implement the lowest grading system, so the CSAT still has a significant impact on admissions. Starting in 2018, some universities have abolished or lenified the lowest grading system, a source of public controversy. However, other universities are tightening or even reintroducing standards.

Originally, there was no limit on the number of applications. But as several problems such as application costs were raised, applications were limited to six times from the 2013 school year. Only four-year universities, including universities of education, are applicable, except for industrial universities, colleges of expertise, and other universities. Universities can limit eligibility for applications. In addition, there was no unregistered recruitment. To minimize the number of people carried forward from the regular admission process from the 2012 school year, unregistered recruitment was also introduced.

Those who have passed early recruitment and unregistered recruitment (except for those who have passed unregistered recruitment only in the 2012 school year when the number of unregistered recruits was first introduced) do not apply for regular admission. Due to the advantage of being able to select excellent students in advance, the proportion of early admissions is increasing. In particular, the number of comprehensive student records screening is increasing, and the number of comprehensive screenings to assess sincerity, serviceability, and creativity is increasing the most.

The portion of the early admissions for college entrance exams in 2019 was expected to be 76.2 percent, the largest ever.

Early admission is largely divided into four types: the comprehensive student record screening, the student record curriculum screening, the essay screening, and the special talent screening.

- The comprehensive student record screening is a comprehensive reflection of student records. These screenings select students by comprehensively evaluating many elements of student records, including attendance, creative experience activities, subject-specific skills and traits, and behavioral development (qualitative evaluation), as well as academic grades (quantitative evaluation). Awards, certificates, and reading activity used to be included but are no longer evaluated by universities. Also, a self-introduction letter consisting of three common questions from the Korean Council for University Education and one voluntary question from each university (for a total of four), was also abolished. In some cases, a teacher recommendation letter is also required. The top universities favored by students perform a high proportion of the overall comprehensive student record screenings.
- The student record curriculum screening considers only academic grades (quantitative evaluation). The difference from the comprehensive student record screening is that elements other than academic grades are not considered. Students in highly competitive schools are at a disadvantage because they do not consider the grade deviation by the school.
- The essay screening is divided into humanities–social sciences and natural sciences. The humanities–social sciences essay asks students to develop a thesis within the framework of a given presentation, and the natural science essay asks students to solve a formula. In many cases, the lowest grade of the CSAT is lower than that of the comprehensive student record screening or the student record curriculum screening.
- Special talent screening has many types, including screenings performed by language and science experts.

==== Criticism of comprehensive student record screening ====
Critics call comprehensive student record screenings a "gold spoon admission," which results in different results depending on parents' socio-economic status or political power. Criticism has been raised that private education aimed at creating a "spec" to be listed in the student record has become a "gold spoon screening" and that it is driving top-ranked students to win in-school awards that will highlight their school records.

Critics have called for improving the school record, which is a major evaluation factor for the comprehensive student record admission process. Complaints are high about the burden of non-curriculum activities, and 86.7% of students (9,507), 85.3% of parents (4,129), and 92.5% of teachers (1,434) said they were "burdened with preparation for non-curriculum activities." In addition, more than 300 cases of unauthorized correction or manipulation of student records have been detected in the three years prior to November 2017, causing heavy workload among teachers, and contributing to the perception that it is a record for college admissions rather than for students' growth development.

Opinion polls also show that the public's perception of the comprehensive student record screening system is not good. In a survey conducted by Realmeter, 14.6 percent of respondents said "the comprehensive student record screening should be abolished completely" and 36.2 percent said it should be reduced. The current maintenance and expansion responses were 19.3 percent and 18.0 percent, respectively. 32.1 percent of the respondents cited "a drastic reduction in non-curriculum activities" as one of the things that need to be improved regarding the comprehensive student record screening. 21.2 percent wanted to "strengthen the disclosure of information at universities," 18.7 percent wanted "monitor fairness at external agencies" and 14.2 percent wanted "reducing the influence of schools and homeroom teachers.

=== Regular admission ===
Regular admission takes place after the results of the College Scholastic Ability Test are announced. In regular admission, a total of three applications can be applied for each recruitment category (Ga, Na, and Da-category, and in the past, there was also the La-category), one for each on-time recruitment in accordance with the six-time limit for early admission (except for industrial universities, colleges, and other universities). In some cases, students are selected by mixing the results of the CSAT scores with the school records, and in other cases, students are selected only by reflecting 100% of the CSAT. In some universities, all colleges of the universities recruit students from the same category, and some universities select students from different categories.

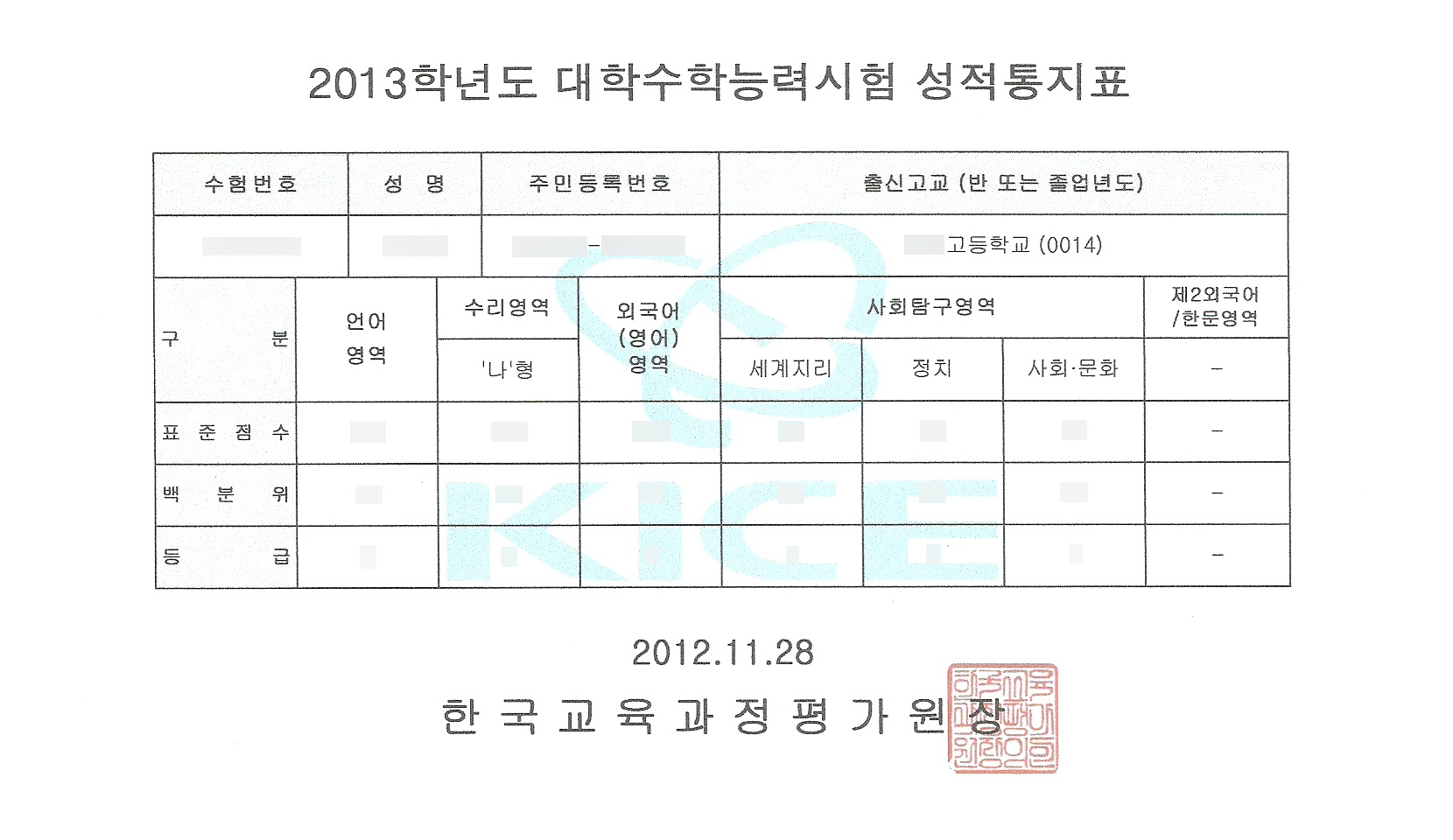
CSAT report

Standard scores and percentiles of the College Scholastic Ability Test are mainly used for regular admission, but in some cases, grades are also utilized. Also, English and Korean history, which are conducted on an absolute evaluation basis, will be reflected in grades unconditionally.

In a survey conducted by Realmeter, 55.5 percent of the respondents said regular admissions centered on the CSAT should account for more than 60 percent. 22.3 percent of the respondents said the proportion of regular admissions should be between 10 and 40 percent, while 17.7 percent said it should be around 50 percent.

=== Special admission ===
In South Korea, special admission is a former system that is available for students with excellent College Scholastic Ability Test (CSAT) scores in advance of regular admission and/or who meet certain criteria that may not be solely based on their academic performance. It was conducted early in the introduction of the College Scholastic Ability Test, and screening began before the results of the College Scholastic Ability Test were announced and was abolished in 2002 when the College Scholastic Ability Test (CSAT) was switched to a nine-grade system. This type of admission process typically occurs outside of the regular admission process.

One common type of special admission is called the "early admission" process, which is designed for students who have outstanding academic achievements or unique talents. The application period for early admission usually takes place in July or August of each year, and the admission results are announced in September. Early admission applicants are required to submit their academic transcripts, letters of recommendation, personal essays, and other documents as determined by the specific university.

Another type of special admission is called the "special selection" process, which is designed for students who have exceptional talents in areas such as sports, music, or the arts. The special selection process is usually conducted by each university individually, and the application requirements and process may vary depending on the university.

In general, special admission is a highly competitive process, and the number of available spots is limited. Therefore, students who are interested in special admission should carefully review the requirements and prepare their application materials well in advance.

=== Additional recruitment ===
In South Korea, some universities offer additional recruitment or rolling admission for college admission. This means that instead of having a single application period, these universities accept applications on a rolling basis throughout the year until all spots are filled.

To apply for additional recruitment or rolling admission, students typically need to submit their academic transcripts, standardized test scores, personal essays, and letters of recommendation, as well as any other required documents specified by the university. The application process and requirements may vary depending on the university.

Since the admission process is ongoing and spots are filled as they become available, it's important for students to apply as soon as possible to increase their chances of being admitted. However, it's also important to note that the admission requirements and the number of available spots may change throughout the year, so students should check with the university regularly for updates and deadlines

== University examination ==
The tests conducted by each university to select the students they want in early or regular admissions are called university examinations. The widely-known types of university exams include essay tests, interview tests, practical tests, and major aptitude tests. Taking university exams in the form of so-called "main exams" before 1994 is prohibited by the Ministry of Education's "three no" policy. However, some government officials have raised the possibility of resurrecting the "main exams" system.

== Recruitment screening ==
=== General screening ===
In South Korea, general screening is a method of selecting ordinary students from within the quota by using student records, the College Scholastic Ability Test, and the university examination. This process for college admission is a competitive process based on a combination of academic performance and standardized test scores. This process is also commonly referred to as the regular admission process.

The general screening process typically takes place in November of each year, with the application period lasting a few weeks. During this time, students are required to submit their academic transcripts, standardized test scores, personal essays, letters of recommendation, and any other required documents as specified by the university.

The admission decision is based on a comprehensive review of the student's application, including their academic achievements, extracurricular activities, personal essays, and letters of recommendation. In addition, the student's scores on the national college entrance exam (CSAT) are also taken into consideration.

The general screening process is highly competitive, and the number of available spots is limited. Therefore, it's important for students to carefully review the admission requirements and prepare their application materials well in advance. In addition, some universities may require an interview or additional exams, so students should be prepared for this possibility as well.

It's also important to note that some universities may have different admission requirements and timelines, so students should check with individual universities for their specific requirements and deadlines.

=== Special screening ===
In South Korea, the special screening system for college admission is divided into two categories: the quota special screening and the extra-quota special screening.

The quota special screening is designed for students who have exceptional talents or achievements in specific areas such as sports, music, or the arts. Each university sets a quota for the number of students that can be admitted through the quota special screening process. The quota varies by university and program, and the number of spots available is limited. Therefore, the competition for admission through the quota special screening process is highly competitive.

The extra-quota special screening is designed for students who have outstanding academic achievements or unique talents that are not covered by the quota special screening categories. The extra-quota special screening process does not have a set number of spots available, and the number of students admitted through this process can vary depending on the university and program. The competition for admission through the extra-quota special screening process is also highly competitive.

The application process and requirements for both the quota special screening and the extra-quota special screening vary depending on the university and program. However, they may include additional essays, interviews, or auditions to demonstrate the student's talents and skills, as well as their academic performance and other application materials.

It's important to note that the special screening process is different from the regular admission process and may have different application deadlines and evaluation criteria. Therefore, students who are interested in special screening should carefully review the admission requirements and prepare their application materials well in advance.

==== Special screening system within the quota ====
The special screening system within the quota includes special talent screening for employed people and students who have performed well in music, art, sports, and other specialties. Most universities usually select and implement their own standards when implementing the special admission system within the quota. In this case, it is conducted in consideration of the school's ideology (especially private universities) or characteristics. In other words, the special screening system within the quota can be largely divided into three types: the employed screening, specialty screening, and independent standard screening by universities. It is mainly being recruited from early admission. Occasionally, regular admissions may be conducted, but the number is small compared to early admissions. However, as major universities in Seoul increase the proportion of regular admissions, the Special screening system within the quota tends to be abolished.

==== Extra-quota special screening ====
The extra-quota special screening is divided into five categories:

- special screening for vocational high school graduates,
- special screening for agricultural and fishing village students (which mainly targets towns and townships, and sometimes includes the government's "new vital areas" of Namwon City, Gimje City, Naju City, Taebaek City, Mungyeong City, and Sangju City according to university standards),
- special screening for special education targets for disabled people,
- special screening for overseas Koreans (The rule also applies to North Korean defectors and foreigners. Even foreign nationals cannot apply for this admission if one of their parents holds Korean nationality. However, if one of the parents is Chinese, even if the other is Korean, it is possible to apply for this status), and
- special screening for students who are socially marginalized or have a special home environment. It is mainly conducted on regular admission, but recently, it is increasingly conducted on early admission.

== See also ==
- Education in South Korea
- List of universities and colleges in South Korea
- College Scholastic Ability Test
- Education curriculum in South Korea
- Education system in South Korea
- Preliminary examination
- Achievement tests
- High school subjects in South Korea
- Layout table
- Japanese college entrance system
