= Won-hwa Hong =

South Korean professor and university administrator

- 홍원화
- Title: President of Kyungpook National University (KNU)

Won-hwa Hong (Korean: 홍원화) is an engineer, professor, and university administrator in South Korea. As a professor in the Department of Architectural and Civil Engineering at Kyungpook National University (KNU), he took office as the 19th President of KNU, South Korea’s largest national university, in 2020. He has also served as the President of the Korean Council for University Education since April 2022.

== Early life and education ==
Hong was born in Yecheon-gun, North Gyeongsang Province, South Korea, and later moved to Daegu. After graduating from Kyungwon High School in Daegu, he landed the Department of Architectural Engineering at Kyungpook National University in 1982.

== Post-graduate education and career ==
Upon graduating from KNU, Hong received his master's and doctoral degrees in Engineering from Waseda University, Japan, and returned to Korea to be appointed as a professor at his alma mater, Kyungpook National University. Subsequently, he served as the Dean of the Office of External Relations, Dean of the Office of Industry-University Cooperation, and Dean of the College of Engineering. He was inaugurated as President of Kyungpook National University on October 21, 2020.. Following his inauguration, the slogan “Bringing Back KNU Pride and Glory” (다시 뜨겁게, 다시 자랑스럽게!) was added to the existing university slogans. On January 26, 2022, he was elected as the 26th President of the Korean Council for University Education.

Since Hong's inauguration in 2020, KNU’s national and international ranking has continuously improved. Among others, the university ranked 93rd in Asia in the 2022 university evaluation released by Quacquarelli Symonds(QS). Most notably, KNU ranked 13th in the world and first in Korea in the 2022 THE Impact Rankings. (Times Higher Education World University Rankings)

== Selected bibliography ==
=== Academic Articles ===
- Classification Model for estimating Demolition Waste Generation considering Structure Types and Wall Material of detached House by ANOVA Analysis (2013)
- An experimental study on how phosphorescent guidance equipment influences on evacuation in impaired visibility (2009)
- Characteristic Features of the Behavior and Perception of Evacuees from the Daegu Subway Fire and Safety Measures in an Underground Fire (2009)
- The performance and economical analysis of grid-connected photovoltaic systems in Daegu, Korea / APPLIED ENERGY (2009)
- A study on the energy consumption unit of subway stations in Korea / Building and Environment (2004)
- The analysis of the economic and environmental effects of the application of a photovoltaic system to the, EXCO(Ex. + Con. Bldg) in Daegu, South Korea (2004)

=== Books ===
Published in Korean, Hangeul:

- Records and lessons learned from the Daegu subway fire disaster of 2/18 (2·18 대구지하철 화재 참사 기록과 교훈), 119magazine (119매거진) (2005)
- Humans and residential culture (인간과 주거문화), Kyungpook National University Press (2013)

=== Media Articles ===
- "The role of universities is to help the local economy," Interview with Hong Won-hwa, Dean of the College of Engineering at Kyungpook National University. MaeilShinmun (August 12, 2019, (Korean)).
- Hong Won-hwa, 19th President of Kyungpook National University, who will take office today. Youngnam Ilbo (October 21, 2020, (Korean)).
- President Hong Won-hwa of Kyungpook National University, "Goals to realize a happy community of communication and harmony." Kyongbuk Ilbo (December 15, 2020, (Korean)).
- "Policy changes should be made so that local universities are the hub of community rehabilitation." BBS NEWS (May 18, 2022, (Korean)).
- Hong Won-hwa, President of the Korean Council for University Education, "We will solve pending issues through 'choice and concentration' in the midst of the university crisis." The Han Kuk Dae Hak Shinmun (June 13, 2022, (Korean)).
