= College Scholastic Ability Test =

South Korean standardised test

- Hangul: 대학수학능력시험
- Hanja: 大學修學能力試驗
- RR: Daehak suhak neungnyeok siheom
- MR: Taehak suhak nŭngnyŏk sihŏm

The College Scholastic Ability Test or CSAT (Korean: 대학수학능력시험; Hanja: 大學修學能力試驗), also abbreviated as Suneung (수능; 修能), is a standardised test which is recognised by South Korean universities. The Korea Institute of Curriculum and Evaluation (KICE) administers the annual test on the third Thursday in November.

The CSAT was originally designed to assess the scholastic ability required for college. Because the CSAT is the primary factor considered during the Regular Admission round, it plays an important role in South Korean education. Of the students taking the test, as of 2023, 65 percent are currently in high school and 31 percent are high-school graduates who did not achieve their desired score the previous year. The share of graduates taking the test has been steadily rising from 20 percent in 2011. Despite the emphasis on the CSAT, it is not a requirement for a high school diploma.

Day-to-day operations are halted or delayed on test day. Many shops, flights, military training, construction projects, banks, and other activities and establishments are closed or canceled, and the KRX stock markets in Busan, Gyeongnam and Seoul open late.

== Purpose ==
The CSAT is designed to test a candidate's ability to study in college, with questions based on Korea's high-school curriculum. It standardises high-school education and provides accurate, objective data for university admission.

== Schedule ==
All questions are multiple-choice, except for the 9 questions in the Mathematics section, which are short answer.

Period	Subject	Time	Number of questions	Points	Notes
Candidates must enter the testing room by 08:10. For the second to fifth periods, students must enter 10 minutes before the test begins.
1	Korean Language	08:40–10:00 (80 min.)	45	100	Q1–17: Reading; Q18–34: Literature; Q35–45: Elective (candidates must choose between Speech and Writing or Linguistics and Media) (2 or 3 points per question)
Break time: 10:00–10:20 (20 min)
2	Mathematics	10:30–12:10 (100 min.)	30	100	Q1–22: Mathematics I, Mathematics II; Q23–30: Elective (candidates must choose between Calculus, Geometry or Probability and Statistics): 30% (9 out of 30) of the questions require short answers (one of the positive integers from 0 to 999).; (2 or 3 or 4 points per question)
Lunch: 12:10–13:00 (50 min.)
3	English Language	13:10–14:20 (70 min.)	45	100	Q1–17: Listening (25 minutes or less); Q18–45: Reading (2 or 3 points per question)
Break: 14:20–14:40 (20 min.)
4	Korean History	14:50–15:20 (30 min.)	20	50	Mandatory subject (2 or 3 points per question)
4	Collection of Korean history question and answer sheets Distribution of first subordinate subject papers	15:20–15:35 (15 min.)			Candidates not taking a subordinate subject(s) return to the waiting room
4	First subordinate subject	15:35–16:05 (30 min.)	20	50	Candidates can choose up to two subjects from Social Science, Natural Science or Vocational Education: Collection time is 2 minutes for each subject.; (2 or 3 points per question)
4	Collection of question and answer sheets	16:05–16:07 (2 min.)			Candidates can choose up to two subjects from Social Science, Natural Science or Vocational Education: Collection time is 2 minutes for each subject.; (2 or 3 points per question)
4	Second subordinate subject	16:07–16:37 (30 min.)	20	50	Candidates can choose up to two subjects from Social Science, Natural Science or Vocational Education: Collection time is 2 minutes for each subject.; (2 or 3 points per question)
Break: 16:37–16:55 (18 min.)
5	Second foreign language/Classical Chinese	17:05–17:45 (40 min.)	30	50	No listening test (1 or 2 points per question)

== Sections ==
The CSAT consists of six sections: Korean, Mathematics, English, Korean history, one chosen subject from Social science, Natural science, and Vocational education, and a Second language and Classical Chinese. All sections are optional except Korean history, but nearly all candidates take all the other sections except a ‘second foreign language and Classical Chinese’.

In the Mathematics section, candidates take Math I (which consists of logarithms, sequences and trigonometry) and Math II (which consists of limits, precalculus and calculus), and are allowed to select one topic among probability and statistics, geometry and calculus.

The subordinate subjects are divided into three sections: social studies, science, and vocational education. Candidates may choose up to two subjects, either from the 17 science or social studies subjects, or from the vocational education subjects. For example, Physics II and Biology I may be chosen for the subordinate section since both are sciences, Chemistry I and Society and Culture may be chosen as well, but World history and Principles of Accounting may not – the former is in the social studies section, and the latter in vocational education. Only vocational high-school graduates can choose the vocational education section, accounting for only 1% of test-takers. The split between sciences and social studies has been fairly even, but in 2024, the number of students taking social studies subjects (225135) overtook the number taking sciences (174649), while the percentage of students taking one science and one social studies exceeded 10%.

In the voluntary second language/Classical Chinese section, the candidate chooses one subject.

Most high-ranked universities used to require applicants to take two science subordinate subjects and Geometry or Calculus in the mathematics section if they apply for a STEM major, and do not accept subordinate subjects in the same field (such as Physics I and Physics II). However, since 2024, most universities abolished the two sciences rule, many opting for an extra scoring system instead. This led to an influx of students from science to social studies. As of 2025, the only universities that require two science subjects for a STEM major are Seoul National University and most medical majors. Many universities also allow Probability and Statistics to be taken as well for a STEM major.

In 2023, the Ministry of Education announced revisions that will take effect starting in 2027, which includes abolishing electives, including Korean Language and Mathematics electives, and replacing different Natural science and social studies subjects with Integrated Science and Integrated Social Studies, which are taught at the 10th grade level in high school.

=== Korean Language ===
In the Korean Language section, candidates are assessed on their ability to read, understand and analyse Korean texts rapidly and accurately. Its 45 questions of the subject are classified into four categories:

Common topics

- Questions 1-17: Reading
- Questions 18-34: Literature

Elective topics (select 1 out of 2 options, Q35-45)

- Speech and Writing
- Language and Media

==== Common subjects ====
===== Reading =====
This category consists of four articles. Each passage has 3-6 questions from the topics of reading theory, humanities/arts, law/economy and science/technology respectively.

Passage Topic	Contents
Reading theory	Article about the significance of reading or a reading journal written by a student
Humanities	A passage about a thinker and their theories from the topics historiography or philosophy (Western and Eastern ethics, logic). The questions normally feature a single person presenting their opinions or two thinkers with opposing opinions.
Arts	Focus on an artist and their works in the fields of music, visual arts and architecture.
Society (Law/economy)	Common law topics are: Civil Code, Administrative law, Philosophy of law, Penal code, commercial act and the Korean Constitution Common economy topics are: macroeconomics and international economics
Science	Biology (especially physiology and biochemistry), astronomy, physics, earth science, chemistry and mathematics
Technology	Texts generally focus on how specialised machines and systems work. Recently texts have focused on newer technologies such as 3D modelling and the metaverse.
Mixed	Some texts feature a combination of two topics. For example, in 2017 September mock exam, a question featuring both the arts and technology was about the scientific origin and the artistic use of concrete architecture. In the 2019 exam, science and the humanities was mixed in a text about the differing viewpoints of Eastern and Western philosophers regarding the universe.

===== Literature =====
This category consists of texts from five categories: classical poetries such as Hyangga, Sijo, Gasa and Goryeo Gayo, classical novels and prose, contemporary poetry, contemporary novels and play and essays. Candidates may be asked to summarise a single passage or outline a common theme between multiple texts (sometimes of different text types), among many other question types.

==== Elective subjects ====
===== Speech and writing =====
This category consists of 11 questions relating to three texts.

Question	Text	Text types	Common questions asked
35-37	Speech	Transcript of a presentation/speech, negotiation, discussion/debate	Speaking style, content, audience response
38-41	Combination of speech and writing	One speech text and one writing text	Conversation style, context, possible issues or corrections, problems to add
42-45	Writing	A text written by a student or text outline	Associating the outline with the text, incorporation of various sources, correction, refuting

===== Language and Media =====
Language forms questions 35-39 and includes topics within grammar: phonology, syntax, morphology, the history of the Korean language, Korean dialects and the Jeju Language.

The history of the Korean language concerns ancient and medieval Korean. Phonology, syntax and morphology involves the patternised principle and exceptional principle. Dialect of Korean and Jeju Language usually deal with Korean dialects in Korea and historical features in specific dialects of Korean.

An additional topic may be used to complete the required five, or two questions are taken from morphology or syntax. Media forms questions 40-45 and relates to the characteristics of media and the creation of an online post or message.

=== Mathematics ===
All mathematics candidates take the Maths I and II and select one elective topic from three choices: Calculus, Geometry or Probability and Statistics. Calculus is most preferred by students applying for natural science majors, while Probability and Statistics are preferred by students applying for the humanities. Geometry is the least popular, with only 4.1% of students selecting it as their elective.

Mathematics
Type	Subject	Contents
Base subject	Math I	I. Exponential and logarithmic functions II. Trigonometric functions III. Sequences
Base subject	Math II	I. Limits and continuous functions II. Differentiation III. Integration
Elective subject	Calculus	I. Limit of a sequence II. Methods of differentiation III. Methods of integration
Elective subject	Probability and Statistics	I. Number of outcomes II. Probability III. Statistics
Elective subject	Geometry	I. Conic section II. Vector on a plane III. Three-dimensional figures and coordinates

=== English Language ===
The English test involves Listening Comprehesive questions from Q1 to 17 and reading questions from Q18 to 45.

Listening Comprehensive questions involve basic conversations of topics including shopping in US Dollar, British Pound, Euro and Korean Won, school activities, community activities and weather forecasts. Question 16 and 17 are extended dialogues which involve class announcements and presentations. Audio tracks are recorded in General American English and Standard Canadian English. British Received Pronunciation and Standard Scottish English, Australian Cultivated Accent, New Zealand Cultivated Accent, Irish Accent, South African Cultivated Accent, Indian Accent, Singaporean Accent and Hong Kong Accent have not been recorded.

The reading questions from 18 to 45 involve topics such as biographies, philanthropy, graphs, grammar, fixing the correct words, orders of sentences, and inferring intentions of sources originating from theses, autobiographies, news articles, academic journals, and EBS textbooks.

Some texts show Anglosphere cultural features that introduce British and American culture and Imperial, Customary Units and International Units, and utilise some sources of English literature such as novels and poetries of Geoffrey Chaucer, William Shakespeare, Charles Dickens, Robert Burns, Walter Scott, George Bernard Shaw, James Joyce, William Butler Yeats and others. They also deal with historical features of the UK and the USA.

They also deal with spelling differences, grammatical differences, Americanism within the US and not in the UK, Same vocabulary with different meanings between the UK and the US from A to Z, Britishness within the UK and not in the US, phonetic differences of standard forms and other differences within American and British English.

=== Korean History ===
Korean History Test and Subordinate subjects are set on same portion of the schedule. The test paper includes 20 questions: 10 questions about Ancient, Medieval and Joseon Dynasty and 10 questions about decolonised Korea by Japan, Korean independence movement, Provisional Government of Korea, Pacific War and World War II, Korean War and Modern History.

=== Subordinate subjects ===
Subordinate subjects
Section	Field	Subject	Related major	Contents
Social Science	Ethics and Philosophy	Life and ethics	Philosophy	Introduction to ethics, teleological and deontological ethics, Thomas Aquinas, Stoicism, Immanuel Kant, utilitarianism, virtue ethics, John Rawls, Alasdair MacIntyre, Jürgen Habermas
Social Science	Ethics and Philosophy	Ethics and ideology	Philosophy	Eastern philosophy: Confucianism, Buddhism, Taoism, Korean philosophy, Chinese philosophy, Indian philosophy Western philosophy: Sophism, Socrates, Plato, Aristotle, Epicureanism, Stoicism, Hellenism, Christianity, Scholasticus, Protestantism, Empiricism, Rationalism, Francis Bacon, Thomas Hobbes, David Hume, René Descartes, Baruch Spinoza, utilitarianism, John Stuart Mill, Jeremy Bentham, Kant, practical ethics, existentialism, virtue ethics, communitarianism, democracy, social contract, natural law, capitalism, socialism
Social Science	Geography	Korean Geography	Geography	Natural Geography: the Korean climate, Geology in Korea Human Geography: Cartography and GIS, Korean geography-based industrial structure, cultural geography in Korea, Urban Geography, Transport geography, Historical Geography, Population geography and Demography Regional Geography: Provincial geography including Northern 5 Provinces, Korean Reunification
Social Science	Geography	World geography	Geography	Physical Geography: Climate in World, Geology in World Human Geography: World Map and GIS, Cultural Geography, Economic Geography, Urban Geography, Transport geography, Population geography and Demography, Historical Geography, Globalisation, regional conflicts and International politics Regional geography: European Geography, North American Geography, East Asian Geography, Southeast Asian Geography, South Asian Geography, Oceanian Geography, South American Geography, West Asian Geography, African Geography, Central Asian Geography
Social Science	History	East Asian history	History	History of Korea, China, History of Taiwan and Republic of China, Hong Kong, Macao, Japan, Mongolia, Singapore and Vietnam
Social Science	History	World History	History	History of the world, Ancient Greece and Rome, Western Europe, Southern Europe, European and Western History, Southeast Asia, South Asia, World War I, World War II, the Cold War
Social Science	General Social Studies	Politics and law	Law Political science International relations	Politics: Political philosophy, legal philosophy, the electoral system, legislative systems, executive system and cabinet, judicial System, constitution of Korea, Comparative politics, Parliamentary system, Unicameral and Bicameral systems, Federalism and Devolution, Reunificagion of Korea, Political History of Korea Law: English Common Law and French and German Civil Law, Criminal Law, Commercial Law, Administrative Law, Contract Law, Labour Law, Family Law, Tort Law, Property Law, Trust Law, Civil Law and Code International Politics: diplomacy and international politics, Structure of UN, Cold War, Geopolitics
Social Science	General Social Studies	Economics	Economics	Microeconomics: Division of labour, Consumer Choice and Production Theory, Cost of Production Theory of Value, Opportunity Cost, Fixed and variable costs, Supply and Demand, Market Structure, Game Theory, Information Economics, Finance Macroeconomics: History of economic theories, IS–LM model, monetary policy, fiscal policy, the macroeconomic model, trade and exchange rates, Economic philosophy, Economic growth, Korean Economy and Korean Economic Growth
Social Science	General Social Studies	Society and culture	Sociology Anthropology	Structural functionalism, conflict theories, symbolic interactionism, social research, socialisation, social groups, deviance, anomie, Émile Durkheim, Robert K. Merton, culture, social inequality, Marxian class theory, social stratification, poverty, gender, welfare and State intervention, Modernisation theory, evolutionary theory, industrialisation, unemployment, globalisation
Natural Science	Physics	Physics I	Physics	Classical mechanics in one dimension, theory of relativity, electromagnetism: electromagnetic induction and Faraday's law, wave properties, semiconductor principles, torque, Archimedes' principle, Pascal's law, Bernoulli's principle, laws of thermodynamics
Natural Science	Physics	Physics II	Physics	I. Classical mechanics: classical mechanics in two dimensions, harmonic oscillator, laws of thermodynamics, proof of ideal gas law II. Electromagnetism: electric dipole moment, Lorentz force, RLC circuit III. Waves and light: Mathematical expression of wave, Huygens' principle, superposition principle, lasers, polarisation of lights IV. Quantum mechanics: black bodies, Wien's displacement law, Stefan–Boltzmann law, photoelectric effect, Compton scattering, matter waves, the Davisson–Germer experiment, uncertainty principle, Schrödinger equation, wave function, quantum tunnelling, scanning tunneling microscope
Natural Science	Chemistry	Chemistry I	Chemistry	Chemical formula, Avogadro constant, mole, periodic table, Bohr model, atomic orbital, spin, Pauli exclusion principle, Hund's rules, Aufbau principle, octet rule, covalent bond, ionic bonding, coordinate covalent bond, Bond dipole moment, acid-base, redox, DNA
Natural Science	Chemistry	Chemistry II	Chemistry	Van der Waals force, hydrogen bond, the ideal gas equation, mole fraction, Dalton's law, cubic crystal system, Raoult's law, vapour pressure, $Q=cm\Delta t$ Heat of reaction, Hess's law, enthalpy, Gibbs free energy, Chemical equilibrium: phase diagram, solubility equilibrium, ionisation equilibrium, buffer solution
Natural Science	Biology	Biology I	Biology	DNA, genes, chromosomes, cell structure division, the cell cycle, Mendelian inheritance, anatomy, Adenosine triphosphate, ecology
Natural Science	Biology	Biology II	Biology	Deeper version of Biology I, Hardy–Weinberg principle, evolution
Natural Science	Earth science	Earth science I	Geology Climatology Astrophysics	Basic Earth Science: The atmosphere, hydrosphere, geosphere, biosphere Geology: Geology and Natural geography of the Korean peninsula, earthquakes, volcanoes, weathering, landslides, weather, tsunamis, environmental pollution, climate change Universe: Star, Earth, Sun, sunspot, Moon, eclipse, extraterrestrial life
Natural Science	Earth science	Earth science II	Geology Climatology Astrophysics	Seismic waves, gravity and magnetic fields, mineral, magma, sedimentary and metamorphic rocks, hydrodynamic equilibrium, adiabatic process, Ekman spirals, sea water, atmospheric circulation, stars, the Milky Way, the Big Bang, dark energy
Vocational education	Agricultural science	Agricultural science		
Vocational education	Engineering	General engineering		
Vocational education	Commerce	Commercial economics		
Vocational education	Oceanography	Fishing and shipping		
Vocational education	Home Economics	Home Economics		

- Second foreign Language/Classical Chinese
  - German I
  - French I
  - Spanish I
  - Chinese I
  - Japanese I
  - Russian I
  - Arabic I
  - Vietnamese I
  - Hanja and Classical Chinese I

== Writing of the test ==
The problems are created by selected members who are university professors and high-school teachers and chosen by KICE. Two groups make the problems: one creates them, and the other reviews and revises them.

The creators are primarily professors and high-school teachers review the questions. Both groups sign non-disclosure agreements with the KICE. In 2012, there was a total of 696 staff members involved in creating the problems. A member of the group earns about $300 per day.

In addition to professors, professional practitioners and high school teachers, Educational Civil Officers from the Ministry of Education of Korea, Education Ministries of the provinces of Korea and the Korea Institute of Curriculum and Evaluation are also present to review the exams. Onsite are protected by security personnel from the Korean National Police and National Intelligence Service, along with support staff including cooks, medical doctors, pharmacists and nurses.

Hotels and resorts owned by private companies and training centres owned by the Government of Korea in remote places are used for test writers. It is closed to visitors.

== Administration ==
High-school graduates and final-year high school students are allowed to sit the test. After the KICE prints test papers and OMR cards, they are distributed three days before the test to each test area. In 2018, there were 85 test areas.

On test day, the KRX stock markets in Busan and Seoul open late, and Public Transport such as Metro System, Light Metro, Light rail, Metropolitan Railways and bus services are increased to avoid traffic jams and allow students to get to the testing sites more easily. The Korean Armed Forces, USFK and UNC change the schedule of military activities to minimise the noises. Planes are grounded during the listening portion of the English section so their noise does not disturb the students.

In some cases, students running late for the test may be escorted to their testing site by police officers via motorcycle. Younger students and members of the students' families gather outside testing sites to cheer them on. Neither students nor administrators may bring in mobile phones, books, newspapers, food, or any other material which could distract other test-takers.

Middle and high school teachers monitor the test. Most testing rooms are high-school classrooms, and there is a 28-candidate limit in each room. Administrators are warned against doing anything which could distract students in any way such as talking, opening windows, standing in front of a desk, sniffling, or making excessive noise. After the test, the marking of the tests takes about one month.

Except for the English and Korean-history sections, grades are based on a stanine curve. A grade, percentile, and a standardised score for each section and subject are added to the transcript. The standardised score is calculated by the following formula:

$S = z \sigma + m$

$S$ and $z$ are standard scores. $\sigma$ is the standard deviation of the standard score, and $m$ is its average. In the national-language and mathematics sections, $\sigma$ is 20 and $m$ is 100. For the rest, $\sigma$ is 10 and $m$ is 50. $z$ is calculated by the following formula:

$z = \frac{x - m_0}{\sigma_0}$

$x$ is the candidate's original score. $m_0$ is the average of the original $a$ candidate scores. $\sigma_0$ is the candidate's standard deviation.

== Preliminary College Scholastic Ability Test ==
The Preliminary College Scholastic Ability Test (PCSAT) is administered nationally. The relationship between PCSAT and CSAT is comparable to that between the PSAT and the SAT in the United States. The PCSAT is divided into two categories: the National United Achievement Tests (NUAT) and the College Scholastic Ability Test Simulation (CSAT Simulation). These tests are more similar to the CSAT than privately administered mock tests, since the PCSAT's examiner committee is similar to that of the CSAT. The CSAT Simulation is hosted by the same institution as the CSAT, and is used to predict the level of difficulty or types of questions which might appear on that year's CSAT.

Although the NUAT and the CSAT Simulation are similar to the CSAT in their number of candidates, types of questions and relative difficulty, the NUAT is hosted by the Ministry of Education for high-school students. The CSAT Simulation is run by KICE and may be taken by anyone who is eligible for the CSAT. Both exams are reliable, official mock tests for the CSAT, and both are graded by the KICE.

=== National United Achievement Test ===
The National United Achievement Test (NUAT, Korean: 전국연합학력평가; Hanja: 全國聯合學力評價) is administered in the same way as the CSAT, and was introduced in 2002 to relieve dependence on private mock tests. High-school students may apply to take the test, and local education offices decide whether it will be administered in their districts. Every office of education in South Korea normally participates in the NUAT to prepare students for the CSAT, and the number of applicants parallels the CSAT. The Seoul Metropolitan Office of Education, Busan Metropolitan Office of Education (freshmen and sophomores), Gyeonggi-do Office of Education, and Incheon Office of Education take turns creating the questions, and the KICE grades the test and issues report cards.

The basic structure of the exam is identical to the CSAT. For mathematics, social studies, science and second language, its range is determined by when it is conducted. (Note: As of 2013, mathematics, social studies and science section on March exams covers the previous year's curriculum for freshmen and sophomores; in other months, the exams normally follows the curriculum. For freshmen, there are ethics, Korean history, geography, and general social studies in the social-studies section; physics, chemistry, biology, and earth science in the science section. The categories are the same for sophomores only on the March exam. After March, social studies include all subjects: geography of Korea, world geography, East Asian history, world history, law and politics, economics, society and culture, life and ethics, and ethics and thought; the science section covers level I subjects (Physics I, Chemistry I, Biology I, and Earth Science I).) In the Korean and English sections, the questions are not directly from textbooks but are constructed in accordance with the curriculum.

As of 2014, there are four NUATs per year; it is not the same for every district, however, and some have only two exams per year for freshmen and sophomores. The NUAT for freshmen and sophomores is held in March, June, September and November; seniors are tested in March, April, July and October to avoid conflict with June and September, when the CSAT Simulation is given.

==== Administering institutions ====
- March: Seoul Metropolitan Office of Education (seniors; freshmen and sophomores, 2006–2009, 2014), Busan Metropolitan Office of Education (freshmen and sophomores, 2010–2013)
- April: Gyeonggi-do Office of Education (seniors, since 2003)
- June: Busan Metropolitan Office of Education (freshmen and sophomores, 2014), Seoul Metropolitan Office of Education (freshmen and sophomores 2002–2004, 2010–2013; seniors 2002), Incheon Office of Education (freshmen and sophomores 2005–2009)
- July: Incheon Office of Education (seniors since 2007), Seoul Metropolitan Office of Education (2005)
- September: Incheon Office of Education (freshmen and sophomores since 2010), Seoul Metropolitan Office of Education (freshmen and sophomores 2004–2008), Busan Metropolitan Office of Education (freshmen and sophomores 2009)
- October: Seoul Metropolitan Office of Education (seniors)
- November: Gyeonggi-do Office of Education (freshmen and sophomores, except 2003)
- December: Seoul Metropolitan Office of Education (freshmen 2003)

=== College Scholastic Ability Test Simulation ===
The College Scholastic Ability Test Simulation (CSAT Simulation, Korean: 대학수학능력시험 모의평가) is given by KICE. Unlike the NUAT, anyone who is eligible for the CSAT may also take this test. The CSAT Simulation was introduced after the CSAT failed to set the proper difficulty level in 2001 and 2002. First implemented in 2002, it was held only in September during its early years. The test has been given twice a year, in June and September, since 2004. It covers everything in the curriculum for the Korean- and second-language sections, and two-thirds of what the CSAT covers for the other sections. The September exam covers everything in every section, like the CSAT. The number of questions and test time per section is identical to the CSAT.

== History ==
Since the liberation of Korea, South Korea has changed its methods of university and college admission from twelve to sixteen times. The policies ranged from allowing colleges to choose students to outlawing hagwons. Parents and students have had difficulty adjusting to the changes. The changes have been cited as evidence of systemic instability and the sensitivity of the admission process to public opinion.

University and college admissions were first left to the universities, and the first CSAT incarnation appeared at the beginning of 1960. The Supreme Council for National Reconstruction established an early CSAT from 1962 to 1963 as a qualification test for students. Due to the small number of students passing the test, colleges soon had a student shortage. The admissions process was criticized as inefficient, and the government scrapped the policy from 1964 to 1968. A similar policy was adopted in 1969 by the Third Republic of Korea, and the new test was the Preliminary College Entrance Examination (대학입학예비고사); it continued, mostly unchanged, until 1981. That year, the policy was significantly changed. The test name was changed to Preliminary College Preparations Examination (대학예비고사), and hagwons (cram schools) were outlawed. In 1982, the test name was changed again to College Entrance Strength Test (대입학력고사).

In the 1990s, there was a rumour that if students had the S-shaped emblem, they could go to a prestigious university (Seoul National University), and if they had the letter III, they could get a score of 300 on the CSAT, which led to the Onata incident in which test takers secretly removed the Sonata III emblem. There were many Sonata IIIs with the letters S and III missing from the emblem and for this reason, Hyundai Motors implemented a free emblem replacement service.

The current CSAT system was established in 1993, and has undergone several revisions since then. In 2004, the government of South Korea introduced a 2008 College Admissions Change Proposal; however, it failed to bring about significant changes. In 2020, the exam was postponed to the first Thursday in December (December 3) due to the COVID-19 pandemic.

The Korean Education Ministry is planning to remove "killer questions" from the Suneung in 2024 after a failed attempt to do so in 2023, citing an excessive reliance on private education and academic pressure.

Four days before the November 2026 test a scandal erupted when it was revealed that a near-perfect score in that nation's tax accountant examination had been achieved using electronic devices and AI. This lead to draconian measures being rushed through and the resignation of the Education Minister Choi Kyo-jin for the belated response. (Another factor was that he had told a parliamentary hearing previously that due to his age, he was not confident in his ability to prevent cheating. In the event, no major incidents occurred.)

== Reception ==
Pressure to perform well on the CSAT has been linked to psychological stress, depression and suicide. The highly competitive exam has also cited as a contributing factor to South Korea's declining birth rate, as parents often pay for expensive hagwon cram schools to help their children study. Critics say this prevalence of cram schools gives students from wealthier families an advantage, and that the test detracts from students' education with its emphasis on rote memorization and topics that are distinct from the curriculum followed in schools. In 2023, the average amount per month spent on private education per student rose to a record high of ₩434,000 (US$300), with 78.5% of students participating in private education. The average student spent 7.3 hours each week in private education.

Considered one of the most important days of a South Korean's life due to its role in determining which university a student gains admission to, the excessive reliance on the Suneung as a means of determining a student's future has also been criticised. Despite this, the test has been noted for its efficiency, emphasis on merit, and educational outcomes.

== Number of applicants ==
Curriculum	Year	Applicants	Examinees	Percentage
5th Curriculum	1993 (1st)	742,668	716,326	96.45%
5th Curriculum	1993 (2nd)	750,181	726,634	96.86%
5th Curriculum	1994	781,749	757,448	96.89%
5th Curriculum	1995	840,661	809,867	96.34%
5th Curriculum	1996	824,374	795,338	96.48%
5th Curriculum	1997	885,321	854,272	96.49%
6th Curriculum	1998	868,643	839,837	96.68%
6th Curriculum	1999	896,122	868,366	96.90%
6th Curriculum	2000	872,297	850,305	97.48%
6th Curriculum	2001	739,129	718,441	97.20%
6th Curriculum	2002	675,922	655,384	96.96%
6th Curriculum	2003	674,154	642,583	95.32%
7th Curriculum	2004	610,257	574,218	94.09%
7th Curriculum	2005	593,806	554,345	93.35%
7th Curriculum	2006	588,899	551,884	93.71%
7th Curriculum	2007	584,934	550,588	94.13%
7th Curriculum	2008	588,839	559,475	95.01%
7th Curriculum	2009	677,834	638,216	94.16%
7th Curriculum	2010	712,227	668,991	93.93%
7th Curriculum	2011	693,631	648,946	93.56%
7th Curriculum	2012	668,522	621,336	92.94%
7th Curriculum	2013	650,747	606,813	93.25%
7th Curriculum	2014	640,621	594,835	92.85%
7th Curriculum	2015	631,187	585,332	92.74%
2009 Revisions	2016	605,987	552,297	91.14%
2009 Revisions	2017	593,527	531,327	89.52%
2009 Revisions	2018	594,924	530,220	89.12%
2009 Revisions	2019	548,734	484,737	88.34%
2015 Revisions	2020	493,433	421,034	85.33%
2015 Revisions	2021	509,821	448,138	87.90%
2015 Revisions	2022	508,030	447,669	88.12%
2015 Revisions	2023	504,588	444,870	88.16%
2015 Revisions	2024	522,670	463,486	88.67%
2015 Revisions	2025	554,174	493,896	89.12%

== See also ==
- Education in South Korea
- List of universities and colleges in South Korea
- College admissions in South Korea
- Programme for International Student Assessment
- Trends in International Mathematics and Science Study
