= Education in South Korea =

Ministry of Education (South Korea)

National education budget (2022)
- Budget: 5.6% of GDP

General details
- Primary languages: Korean

Literacy
- Total: 100%
- Male: 100%
- Female: 100%
- Primary: 3.3 million
- Secondary: 4.0 million
- Post secondary: 3.6 million

Attainment
- Secondary diploma: 98.0%
- Post-secondary diploma: 69.8%

Education in South Korea is provided by both public schools and private schools with government funding available for both. South Korea is known for its high academic performance in reading, mathematics, and science, consistently ranking above the OECD average. South Korean education sits at ninth place in the world.

The education system in South Korea is known for being very strict and competitive. Students are expected to get into top universities, especially the "SKY" universities (Seoul National University, Korea University and Yonsei University). While this focus has helped the nation's economy grow and boost the rate of education of its people, the issues that arise from this has left much up for debate.

== History ==
=== Pre-division period ===
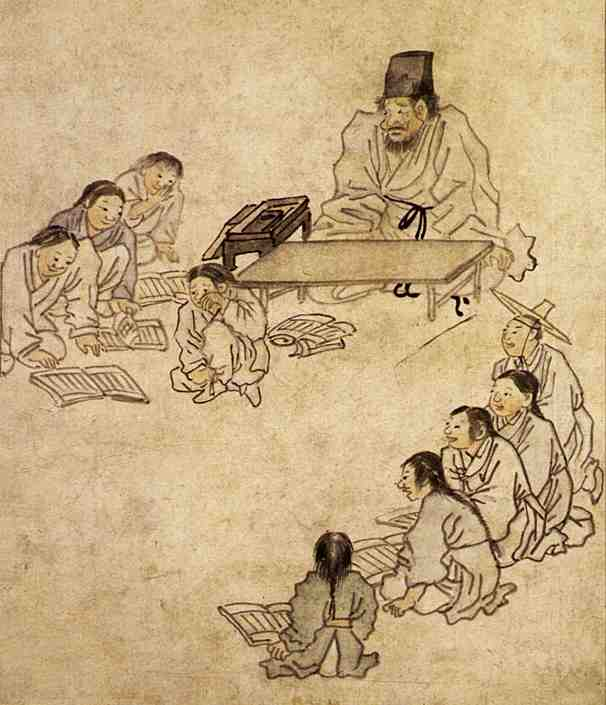
The 18th-century Joseon School painted by Kim Hong-do

Education has been present throughout the history of Korea (1945–present). Public schools and private schools have both been present. Reforms to education began in the late 19th century. Since its founding, Korean education has been heavily influenced by Confucian values. Confucianism instills the facilities of governance of men by merit, social mobility through education, and the civil examination system based upon the system used during Tang Dynasty China. As a result, reading, writing and knowledge of Chinese classics became the primary method in choosing individuals for bureaucratic positions, gaining them a respective social status and privileges.

The Joseon period was significant in shaping the dynamics and foundation of the Korean education system. Schools ingrained loyalty, orthodoxy and motivation for official recruitment into its students. The primary means to receive an education during the Joseon dynasty were through village schools (seodang; seojae) and through private tutoring. The seodang was the most common method of formal education until the late twentieth century.

It was usually available only to a handful of neighborhood boys, starting at the age of seven. The role of official schools gradually started to decline from the mid-sixteenth century with the emergence of private academies (seowon), which were rural retreats and centers of learning. The majority of them were closed in the 1870s in an effort to centralize authority.

Preparing students for competitive examinations was pronounced during the Joseon dynasty as a means of social mobility and selection of official positions, and remained a basic tenet in Korean education throughout its history. This extreme emphasis on education and meritocracy was contrasted by hereditary aristocracy during the Joseon dynasty, where bloodlines and kinship were particularly pronounced. Due to Confucian influences, education was able to maintain an equalizing presence over society because of its belief in each individual being capable of benefitting from formal education and achieving enlightenment.

Education was dominated by the exalted scholar-teacher relationship, where teachers held a sacred status and were seen as a principal source of ethical counsel. This convention engendered the tradition of remonstrance, which obligated the scholar to criticize the actions of the government and the king in order to avoid threatening the Confucian concept of the moral order of the universe.

The dynastic period did not prioritize specialized training, and thus a preference for a non-specialized and literary education has remained. Many of these developments were pronounced towards the end of the 19th century when the Joseon dynasty began implementing a Western-style education system as a result of the intrusion of foreign powers. By 1904, public education was confined to Seoul, which was generally resisted by both the public and government officials.

This maintained the dominance of seodang and other traditional institutions as the primary means to receive a formal education. As a result of financial support from members of the royal family and American missionary activities and schools, the number of schools began to increase in the early 1900s. In order to promote literacy, a mixed script of Hangul and Chinese characters was added to instruction.

During the Japanese occupation (1905–1945), Korea established a comprehensive and modern system of national education, through centralization and deliberate planning to integrate Japanese occupational professionalism and values. Education was based on Japanese values, literacy and history so that Koreans would become loyal to Japan and wipe out Korean culture and history.

However, there were severe restrictions like the lack of access to education beyond the elementary level and the manipulation of education to indoctrinate Koreans to become loyal to the Japanese Empire. This led to turmoil and discontent among those who were forced to assimilate. Koreans were only offered a low-level and non-professional education, in contrast to their Japanese counterparts. This was pronounced by the Educational Ordinance of 1911, where Japanese residents had fourteen years of schooling available, whereas Koreans only had eight years available to them.

Higher education was a central issue for Koreans, who were provided very limited access to these institutions as well as positions of administration and teaching. With the introduction of the Educational Ordinance of 1938, Korean schools became identical to Japanese ones in organization and curriculum, making education a highly regimented tool for forced assimilation and militarization.

=== Post-war years ===
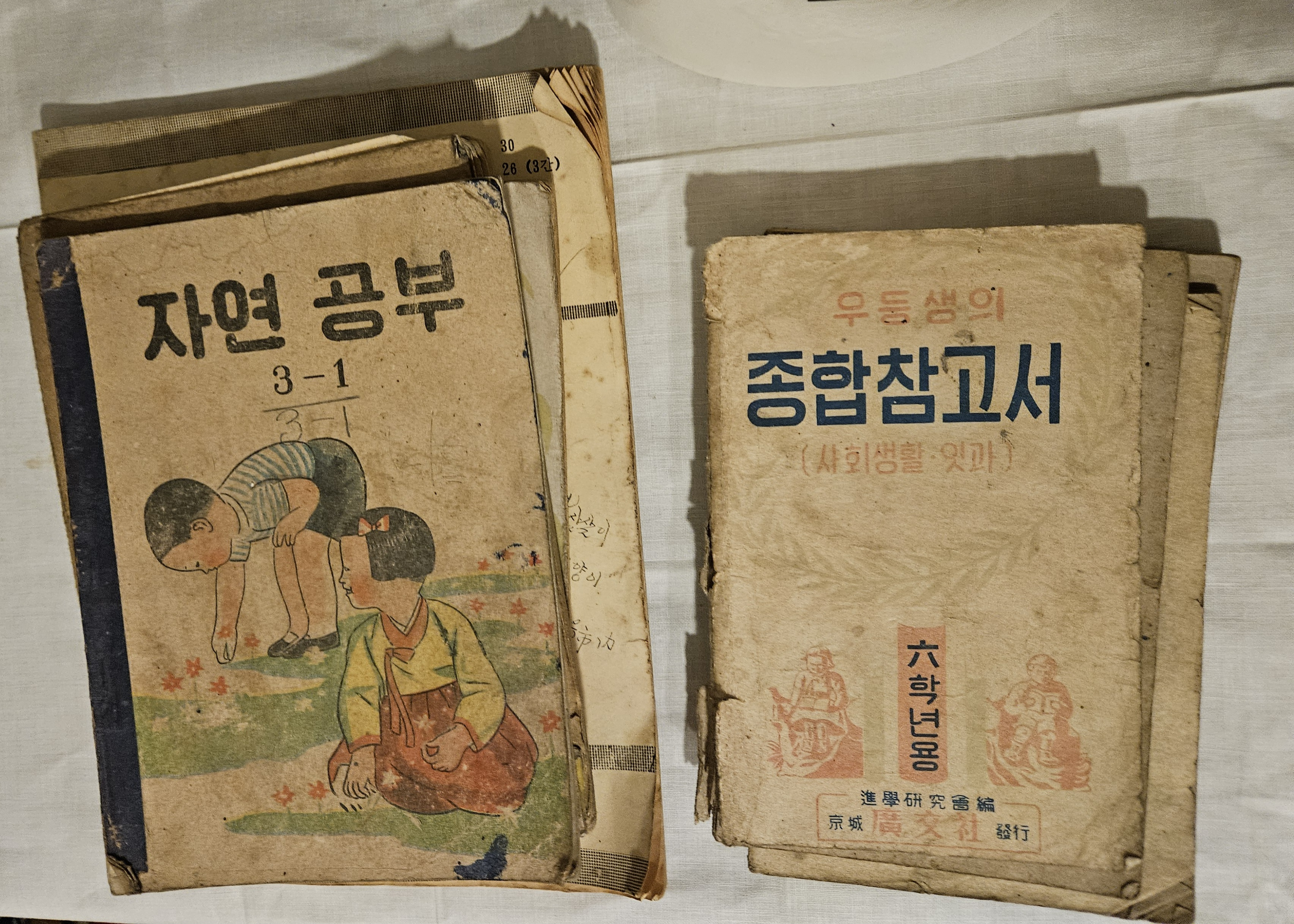
Mid-20th century educational books about nature and society, respectively

After Korea's liberation from Japan, the government began to study and discuss a new philosophy of education. The new educational philosophy was created under the United States Army Military Government in Korea (USAMGIK), with a focus on democratic education. The new system attempted to make education available to all students equally and make the educational administration more self-governing. It emphasized a decentralized system under local and community control in order to maintain education's separation from politics. Specific policies included re-educating teachers, teaching adults to read and write, restoration of the Korean language for technical terminology, and expansion of various educational institutions.

During the years when Rhee and Park Chung Hee were in power, the control of education was gradually taken out of the hands of local school boards and concentrated in a centralized Ministry of Education. In the late 1980s, the ministry was responsible for the administration of schools, allocation of resources, setting of enrollment quotas, certification of schools and teachers, curriculum development, including the issuance of textbook guidelines, and other basic policy decisions. Provincial and special city boards of education still existed. Although each board was composed of seven members who were supposed to be selected by popularly elected legislative bodies, this arrangement ceased to function after 1973. Subsequently, school board members were approved by the minister of education.

Some time later, a debate between whether to maintain the multitrack system or to adopt a single system akin to that of the American education system. A multitrack and single secondary school system prevailed in the end, largely due to the fact that administrators did not want to divide institutions, and parents were not receptive to the idea of two entrance exams. The outcome of the 1950 MOE proposal for a uniform system was a 6-4-3-4 academic schedule, which entailed 6 years of primary school, 4 years of middle school, 3 years of vocational or academic high school, and 4 years of college or university.

A complex system of technical and vocational training was also added to educational policy, where children were able to decide on an academic versus a vocational route early on in their academic career. Many opponents of this policy actually viewed it as positive because they believed that the academic route would seem more prolific and parents and students would be willing to pursue it more than the vocational route.

Even though a few local school boards were established toward the late 1940s, they were not appreciated by many Koreans because there was a widespread notion that a uniform and centrally controlled system is best. A rigorous and uniform national curriculum was established in the mid-1950s and there were significant efforts to make school accessible for everyone, especially in the context of Rhee's declaration of compulsory universal literacy and basic education. While universal basic education eliminated disparities between classes, competition became very fierce due to restricted entry into higher academic tiers, which contributed to the predominant "education fever" that is still prevalent in South Korea.

In the 1960s, there was a difficulty in harnessing the demand for education towards the needs of an industrializing economy, which caused a growth in private foundations in order to supply the public demand for schooling. The 60s and 70s were characterized by a large demand to direct educational development to economic development, which necessitated a greater emphasis on vocational and technical training rather than academic training in order to help citizens gain skills that would supply the country's economic needs.

Even though there were major criticisms on behalf of the public for this emphasis on vocational training due to a clashing with Confucian values, the state continued to strengthen vocational education, especially after the shift in industrialization to heavy chemical and machine industries in the 70s. The 1960s and 70s experienced turmoil in education systems due to public resistance and the recalcitrance of private schools toward the state as they attempted to supply public demand. While the state was able to fulfill many of its economic goals, it came at a great social and political cost such as the de-population of rural areas and President Park's assassination.

South Korea's modernization and economic growth after the Korean War are often attributed to the resources invested in education. The adult literacy rate grew from an estimated 22 percent to 87.6% between 1945 and 1970, with estimates around 93% in the late 1980s. In 1987, about 34 percent of secondary-school graduates attended institutions of higher education, one of the highest rates in the world. Government expenditure on education rose from 220 billion won in 1975 to 3.76 trillion won by 1986. This equated to an increase from 2.2 percent of GNP to 4.5 percent.

After General Chun Doo-hwan took power in 1980, the Ministry of Education's reforms increased higher education opportunities for the general population – expanding enrollment and attempting "to make the system fairer".

The 1980s and 1990s marked an era of democratization and economic prosperity in South Korea, partly due to the "education fever". In 1991, for the first time in thirty years, the country elected provincial and city councils in order to localize education. Leaders like Kim Young-sam and Kim Dae-jung were able to enact major overhauls to the education system in order to accommodate democratization through methods like abolishing on-campus ROTCS training and political mobilization of students, legalization of teacher unions, and removing anti-communist texts. The MOE began to shift away from a uniform curriculum, by allowing school boards to implement some minor variations in instructional content. Literacy became virtually universal in South Korea while it rose up in international ranks in math and science, especially.

Despite South Korea's democratization, traditional and Confucian values remained very strong. Overall, the huge strides in educational development came at the cost of intense pressure among students, high suicide rates, and family financial struggles through investment in schooling and private tutoring. However, Korea is shifting away from fully academic-based education to competency-based education.

== School grades ==
Level/grade	International age	Korean age
Infant school		
Nursery school	0–2	
Kindergarten	3–5	
Elementary school		
1st grade	6–8	8–9
2nd grade	7–9	9–10
3rd grade	8–10	10–11
4th grade	9–11	11–12
5th grade	10–12	12–13
6th grade	11–13	13–14
Middle school		
7th grade (Note: 7th grade is called "Middle school 1st grade" in South Korea. Similarly, 8th grade is called "Middle school 2nd grade" and 10th grade is called "High school 1st grade".)	12–14	14–15
8th grade	13–15	15–16
9th grade	14–16	16–17
High school		
10th grade	15–17	17–18
11th grade	16–18	18–19
12th grade	17–19	19–20
Post-secondary education		
Tertiary education (college or university)	Ages vary (usually four years, referred to as freshman, sophomore, junior and senior years)	

== Primary education ==
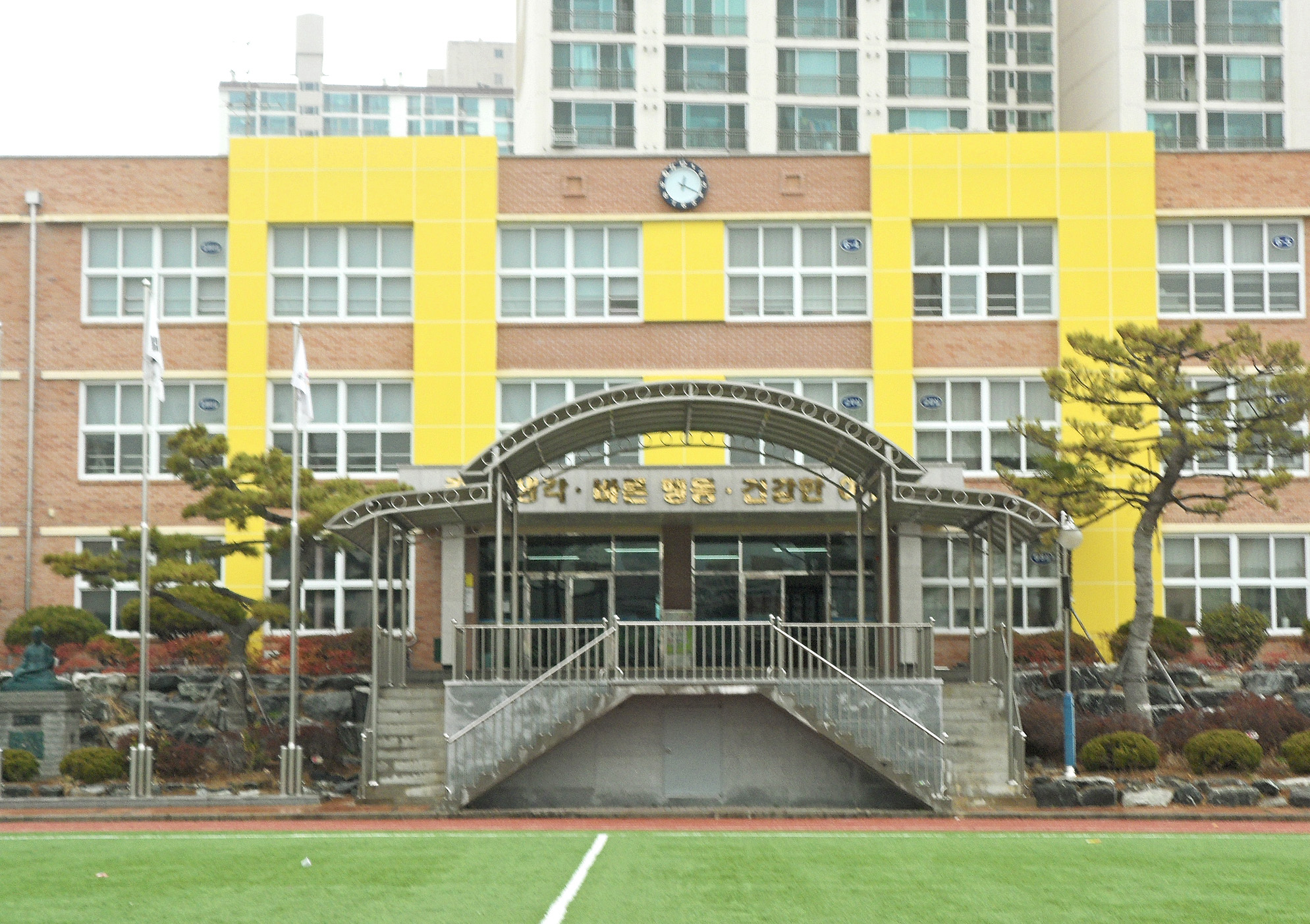
The front Entrance of Daehyun Elementary School in Ulsan

Elementary schools (Korean: 초등학교, 初等學校, chodeung hakgyo) consists of grades one to six (age 8 to age 13 in Korean years—7 to 12 in western years). The South Korean government changed its name to the current form from Citizens' school (Korean: 국민학교, 國民學校).

In elementary school, students learn the following subjects. The curriculum differs from grades 1–2 to grades 3–6.

Contents	Grades 1~2 (Elementary School Adaptation Stage)	Grade 3 and after (Beginning of Full-scale Study)
Topics	Korean (listening, speaking, reading, writing); Mathematics; Disciplined life (바른 생활) (moral education, social studies); Sensible life (슬기로운 생활); Safe life (안전한 생활) (safety education); Enjoyable life (즐거운 생활) (music, arts, physical education, and other basic skills and basic lifestyle habits)	Korean (listening, speaking, reading, writing); Social studies; Moral education; Mathematics; Science; Physical education; Music; Art; Practical (technical/household) skills and English added; Safe life (안전한 생활): safety education is merged into physical education
Classroom Location	Mostly in levels 1~2	Mostly in upper floors above level 3
Class president election	None	Class president and vice presidents elected by voting
Class Duration	Maximum 5 periods (40 minutes per period)	Maximum 7 periods
Exams	Issued in Four-choice (one correct answer out of four questions per problem, 25% probability) format.	Changed to Five-choice (one correct answer out of five questions per problem, 20% probability) format.
Special classes (PE, Music, Science, Languages, etc.)	Only done in places like Schoolyard, Auditorium, and Gym	Many transfers to special classrooms (language room, art room, science room, etc.).
Club activities	None	Done in each grade and class
Daily schedule	Over by 2 PM	Over before 4 PM

Usually, the class teacher covers most of the subjects; however, there are some specialized teachers in professions such as physical education and foreign languages, including English.

Those who wish to become a primary school teacher must major in primary education, which is specially designed to cultivate primary school teachers. In Korea, most of the primary teachers are working for public primary schools.

In 2023, the Korean Ministry of Education announced a new policy. Therefore, mobile phone use during class is prohibited in elementary, middle, and high schools except for emergencies. If a student uses a mobile phone during class, the teacher may confiscate it. In addition, acts of sending a student who disrupts class out of the classroom or physically restraining them are also recognized as "legitimate discipline." Corporal punishment has been officially and legally prohibited in every classroom since 2011.

== Secondary education ==
"In 1987, there were approximately 4,895,354 students enrolled in middle schools and high schools, with approximately 150,873 teachers. About 69% of these teachers were male." About 98% of Korean students finish secondary education.

=== High school ===
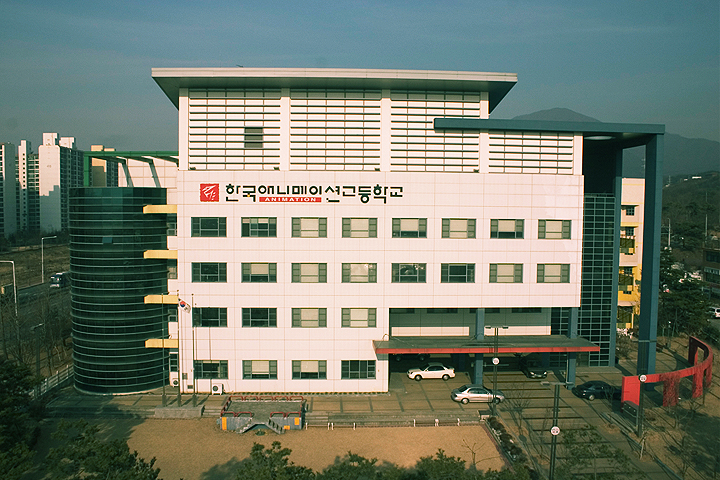
Animation Vocational High School in Hanam, South Korea

High schools in Korea can be divided into specialty tracks that accord with a student's interest and career path or a normal state high school. For special high schools, there are science high schools like Seoul Science high school, foreign language, international, and art specialty high schools that students can attend by passing entrance examinations which are generally highly competitive. These schools are called special-purpose high schools.

Autonomous private high schools are relatively free of the policy of the Ministry of Education. There are schools for gifted students. Tuition of many special-purpose high schools, autonomous private high schools, and schools for gifted students are extremely expensive. In 2009, the average tuition cost of special-purpose or autonomous private high school was US$5,614 per year. One of the schools for gifted students is US$7,858 per year.

High school is not mandatory, unlike middle school education in Korea. However, according to a 2005 study of Organisation for Economic Co-operation and Development (OECD) member countries, some 97% of South Korea's young adults complete high school. This was the highest percentage recorded in any country.

Since 2025, the Korean government has been gradually implementing a high school credit system, which allows students to choose courses according to their interests and career goals.

=== Vocational ===
South Korea had a strong vocational education system that shattered due to the Korean War and the economic collapse following the war. The vocational education system was thereafter rebuilt. For students not desiring to enter university, vocational high schools specializing in fields such as technology, agriculture, or finance are available. Around 20 percent of high school students are in vocational high schools.

In vocational high schools, curriculum is split equally between general courses and vocational courses. General education teaches academic core courses such as Korean, mathematics, science, and social studies while vocational training offers courses related to agriculture, technology, industry, commerce, home economics, fishing, and oceanography.

Agriculture, fishery, and oceanography high schools have been set up in rural areas and harbor cities to combat the shortage of labor due to urban sprawl. Agricultural high schools focus on scientific farming and are designed to produce skilled experts in agriculture while fishery and oceanography high schools utilize maritime resource to focus on navigation technology. Since the 1980s, vocational high schools have offered training in various fields to create a labor force that can adjust to the changes across South Korean industry and society.

Due to needs of manpower across the heavy and chemical industries in the 1970s, the need for vocational education was crucial. By the 1980s, due to the great changes in technology, the objective of vocational education shifted to create a supply of well-trained technicians. When students graduate from vocational high school, the students receive a vocational high school diploma and may choose to enter the workforce or go on to higher education. Many vocational high school graduates go on to attend junior colleges to further their education.

==== Meister Schools ====
According to a 2012 research report from The McKinsey Global Institute, the lifetime value of a college graduate's improved earnings no longer justifies the expense required to obtain the degree. Also highlighted in the report was the need for more vocational education to counteract the human cost of performance pressure and the high unemployment rate among the country's university-educated youth. The South Korean government, schools, and industry with assistance from the Swiss government and industry are now redesigning and modernizing the country's once strong vocational education sector with a network of vocational schools called "Meister Schools". The purpose of the Meister schools is to reduce the country's shortage of vocational occupations such as auto mechanics, plumbers, welders, boilermakers, electricians, carpenters, millwrights, machinists and machine operators as many of these positions go unfilled.

Developed to revamp South Korea's vocational education system to be specifically designed to prepare youths to work in high-skilled trades and high-skilled manufacturing jobs and other fields, these schools are based on the German-style Meister schools, to teach youngsters to become masters of a skilled trade.

Many of Meister schools offer a wide range of skilled trades and technical disciplines that offer near guarantee of employment to graduates with an industry-supported curriculum design, and focus on developing skills required by various trades.

The government of South Korea has taken initiatives to improve the perception of manual labour and technical work.

In addition, vocational streams have been integrated with academic streams to allow a seamless transition to university in order to allow further advancement. Meister schools offer apprenticeship-based training which takes place at vocational high schools, community and junior colleges. Meister schools also offer employment support systems for specialized Meister high school students. The South Korean government has established an "Employment First, College Later" philosophy wherein after graduation students are encouraged to seek employment first before making plans for university. With changing demands in the Information Age workforce, global forecasts show that by 2030, the demand for vocational skills will increase in contrast to the declining demand for unskilled labor largely due to technological advances.

Meister schools are continuing to be proven a good influence in changing the opinion of vocational education, yet only 15,213 (5 percent) of high school students are enrolled in Meister schools. This is due to lack of demand for Meister school admission, despite a 100 percent employment rate after graduation. Meister students instead are using these schools as an alternative path to university. If a student works in industry for three years after graduating Meister school, they are exempt from the extremely difficult university entrance exam.

Nonetheless, the perception of vocational education is changing and slowly increasing in popularity as participating students are working in highly technical, vital careers and learning real skills that are highly valued in the current marketplace, oftentimes earning more annually than their university educated peers. Vocation and Meister school graduates have been swamped with job offers in an otherwise slow economy. The initiative of Meister schools has also helped youth secure jobs at conglomerates such as Samsung over candidates who graduated from elite universities. South Korea has also streamlined its small and medium-sized business sector along German lines to ease dependence on the large conglomerates ever since it began introducing Meister schools into its education system.

Despite a high unemployment rate during the Great Recession, Meister school graduates maintained strong employment outcomes. Boosting employment for young people through vocational education became a top priority for the Park administration, since youth unemployment was roughly three times higher than the national average. These vocational high schools provided a practical alternative to the traditional university-bound track, expanding direct employment opportunities across various industrial sectors.

== Higher education ==
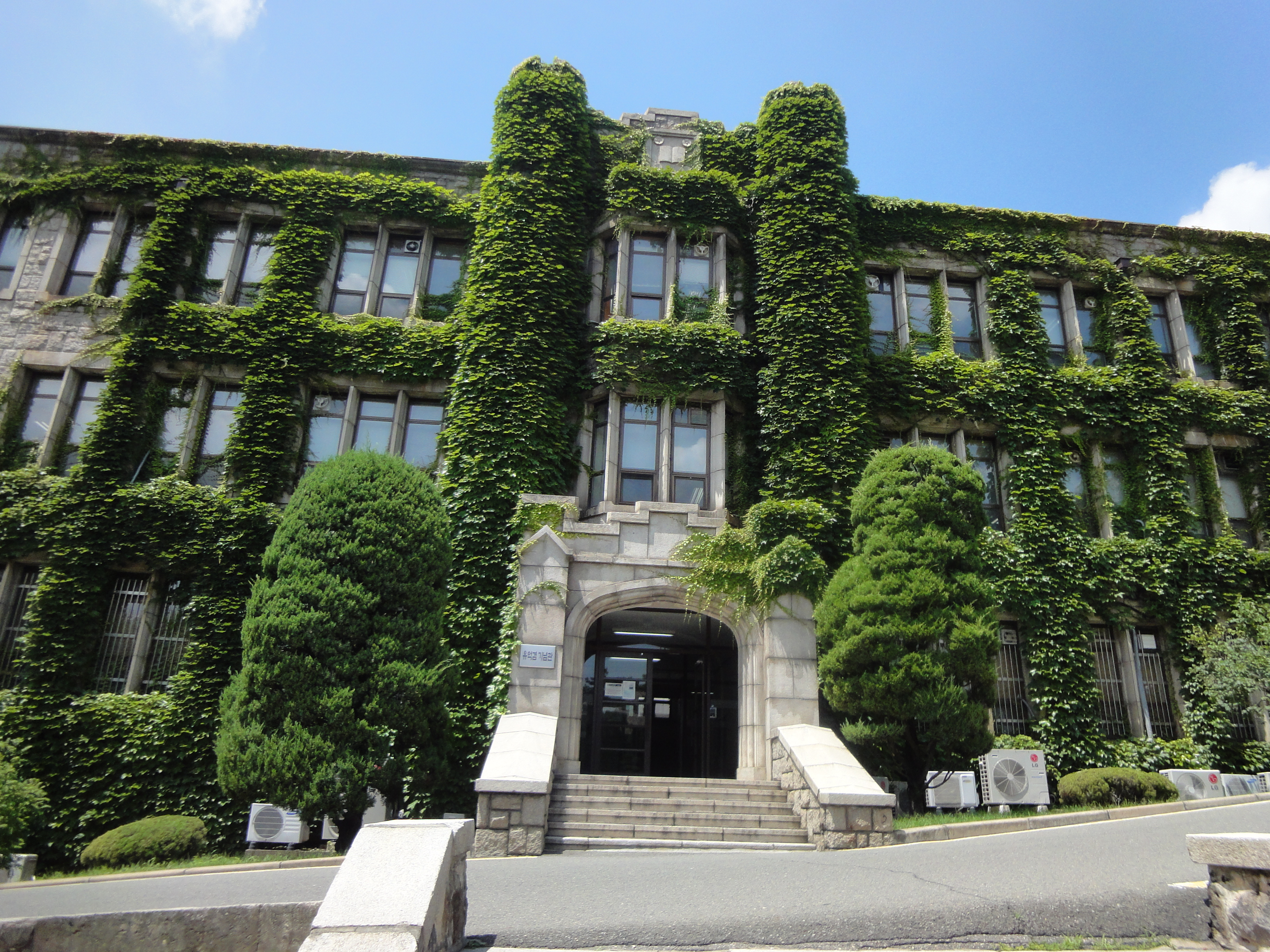
Yonsei university in Seoul, South Korea

Higher education in South Korea is provided primarily by universities (national research universities, industrial universities, teacher-training universities, broadcast and correspondence universities, cyber universities, graduate schools, open universities, and national universities of education) and colleges (cyber colleges, technical colleges, colleges in company, graduate school colleges) and other research institutions.

The South Korean higher education system is modeled after the United States. Colleges, namely junior colleges and community colleges, award apprenticeships, licenses, citations, certificates, associate degrees or diplomas. Universities award bachelor's, master's, professional, and doctoral degrees.

=== History ===
The history of higher education in South Korea traces its roots back the 4th century AD, starting with the founding of Daehak (National Confucian Academy) in Goguryeo in 372 CE. The modern Korean higher education system traces its roots in the late 19th century. Missionary schools introduced subjects taught in the Western world and vocational schools were crucial for the development of a modern society.

Today there are colleges and universities whose courses of study extend from 4 to 6 years. There are vocational colleges, industrial universities, open universities and universities of technology. There are day and evening classes, classes during vacation and remote education classes. The number of institutes of higher education varied consistently from 419 in 2005, to 405 in 2008, to 411 in 2010.

Private universities account for 87.3 percent of total higher educational institutions. Industrial universities account for 63.6% and vocational universities account for 93.8%. These are much higher than the percentage of public institutes.

=== University ===
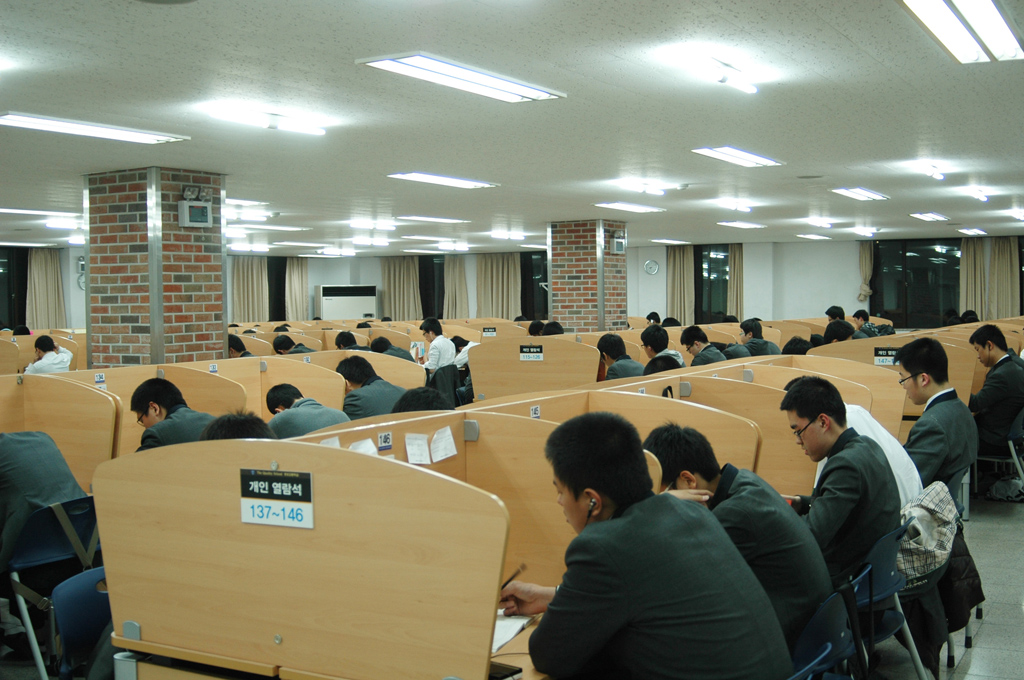
The reading room of a universities' library with private cells

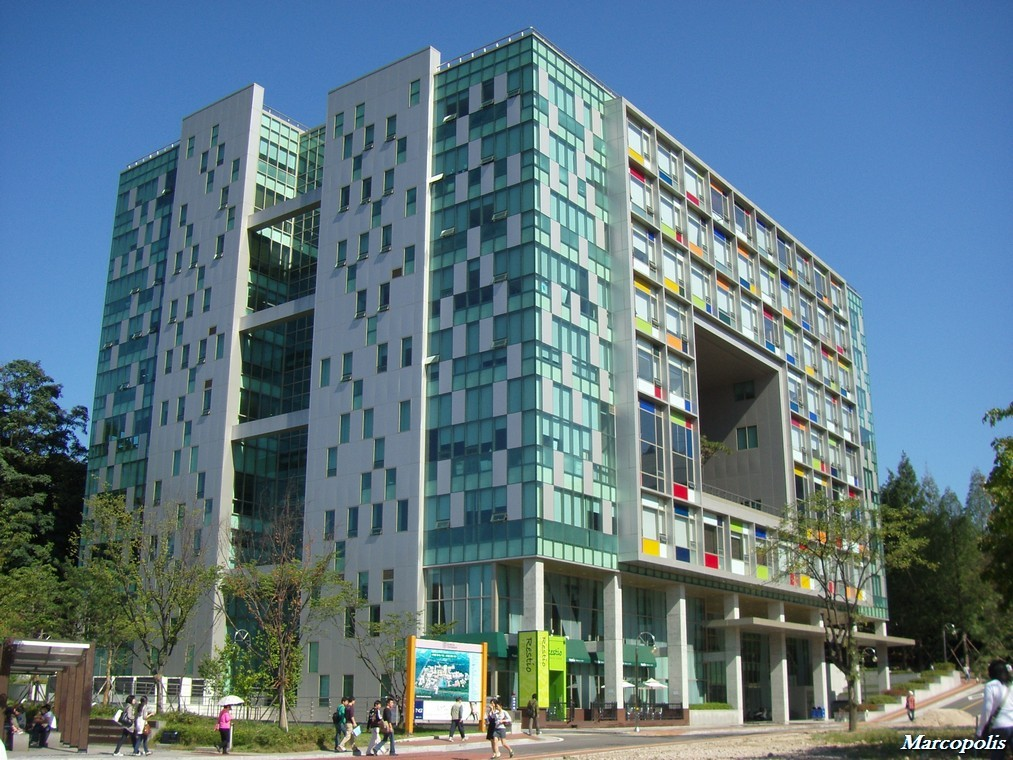
Konkuk University campus

University is the traditional route pursued by young South Koreans after graduating from high school as it is by far the most prestigious form of higher education in the country. In 2004, nearly 90 percent of general high school graduates achieved university entrance. In 2017, over 68.9% of South Korean high school graduates advanced to a university.

Competition for university spots is fierce as many students vie for spots at the country's universities, many of which are key national research universities offering bachelor's, master's, professional and doctoral degrees. The three most prestigious universities in South Korea, collectively referred to as "SKY," are Seoul National University, Korea University, and Yonsei University.

There are also renowned research-intensive universities such as Korea Advanced Institute of Science and Technology and Pohang University of Science and Technology.

In contrast to Canada and the United States, where grade point averages and percentages serve as primary indicators of eligibility, university admission in South Korea heavily relies on the results of the College Scholastic Ability Test (CSAT), which accounts for 60 percent of the evaluation criteria. The remaining 40 percent is determined by the academic performance reflected in high school transcripts. In addition to the CSAT scores, universities also take volunteer experience, extra-curricular activities, letters of recommendation, school awards, portfolios into consideration when assessing a prospective applicant.

==== Bachelor's ====
Bachelor's degree's in South Korea are offered by universities such as four-year colleges and universities, industrial universities, national universities of education, the Korean National Open University, technical colleges and cyber universities. Bachelor's degrees typically take four years to complete while professional degrees related to medicine, law, and dentistry can take up to six years. Students typically major in one or two fields of study in addition to a minor. A bachelor's degree requires up to 130 to 140 credit hours to complete. After all course requirements are met, the student receives a bachelor's degree upon graduation.

==== Master's ====
Master's degrees are offered by four-year colleges and universities, independent institutions affiliated with a four-year college or university, universities of education or the Korean National Open University. In order to be eligible and gain acceptance into a master's degree program, the applicant must possess a bachelor's degree with a GPA of 3.0 (B) or greater from a recognized higher education institution, submit two undergraduate recommendation letters from professors, and an undergraduate record showing their GPA.

Qualifying examinations must also be taken in addition to an interview. Master's programs have 24 credit hours of coursework in addition to a thesis that is generally has to be completed within two years. In a master's degree program, the student must achieve a GPA of 3.0 (B) or higher, pass a comprehensive oral and written examination as well as a foreign language examination, as well as completing and defending a master's thesis in order to graduate. Upon successful completion of a master's program, the student receives a master's degree.

==== Doctoral ====
In order to gain acceptance into a doctoral program, an applicant must hold a master's degree, possess a research background related to their field of study, as well as have professor recommendations. Doctorate programs are sometimes administered in conjunction with master's programs with the student needing to complete 60 credit hours in conjunction with the master's degree, with a final GPA of 3.0 (B) or higher which takes up to four years to complete. Doctoral students must also pass a comprehensive oral and written examination, two foreign language examinations, as well as completing and defending a doctoral dissertation in order to graduate. When successfully completed, the student receives a Doctoral Degree.

=== Vocational ===
Though South Korean society places a far greater emphasis on university rather than vocational education, vocational schools remain as another option for those who choose not to go take the traditional route of going to university. Negative societal views and prejudice against tradespeople, technicians, and vocational school graduates are stigmatized, subjected to unfair treatment, and are still looked down upon due to the enduring negative stigma associated with vocational careers and the absence of a university degree, which continues to remain firmly entrenched in modern South Korean society. Vocational education is offered by industrial universities, junior colleges, open universities, and miscellaneous institutions.

==== Industrial universities ====
Industrial universities in South Korea are also known as polytechnics. These institutions were established in 1982 as an alternative route to higher education for people already in the workforce. Industrial universities offer both diplomas and bachelor's degrees.

==== Community and junior colleges ====
Community and junior colleges, also known as junior vocational colleges offer professional certifications in trades or technical careers and programs related to the liberal arts, early childhood education, home economics, business administration, technology, engineering, agriculture, fisheries, radiation, clinical pathology, navigation, and nursing. The majority of programs typically require a duration of two to three years for completion. Prior to the establishment of junior colleges, many vocational high schools were founded in the 1960s with the purpose of training mid-level technicians.

Admission standards for community and junior colleges are comparable to those of four-year universities, albeit with slightly less stringent and competitive requirements for acceptance. 50 percent of the admission quotas are reserved for graduates of vocational high schools or applicants with national technological qualifications. When successfully completed, junior college graduates are awarded a diploma or an associate degree.

Junior college graduates may choose to enter the workforce or transfer to a four-year university to further their studies.

==== Miscellaneous institutions ====
Highly specialized programs are offered by miscellaneous institutions which grant two-year diplomas or four-year bachelor's degrees.

Number of schools and students of higher education as of April 2022
Classification		Total		National		Public		Private	
Classification		Schools	Students	Schools	Students	Schools	Students	Schools	Students
Junior college course	Junior college	134	576,041	2	2,803	7	8,923	125	564,315
Junior college course	Distance college	1	1,585	0	0	0	0	1	1,585
Junior college course	Cyber college	2	6,972	0	0	0	0	2	6,972
Junior college course	Corporate university	5	131	0	0	0	0	5	131
Junior college course	Specialization College	3	14,821	0	0	0	0	3	14,821
Junior college course	Polytechnic college	9	23,910	0	0	0	0	9	23,910
Junior college course	Total	154	623,460	2	2,803	7	8,923	145	611,734
Undergraduate course	Regular college	190	1,938,254	33	430,323	1	12,331	156	1,495,600
Undergraduate course	Special college of education	10	15,409	10	15,409	0	0	0	0
Undergraduate course	Industrial college	2	14,539	0	0	0	0	2	14,539
Undergraduate course	Technical college	1	62	0	0	0	0	1	62
Undergraduate course	Open college	1	142,719	1	142,719	0	0	0	0
Undergraduate course	Miscellaneous college	2	3,438	1	3,239	0	0	1	199
Undergraduate course	Distance college	3	209	0	0	0	0	3	209
Undergraduate course	Cyber college	1	901	0	0	0	0	1	901
Undergraduate course	Corporate university	17	135,155	0	0	0	0	17	135,155
Undergraduate course	Total	227	2,250,686	45	591,690	1	12,331	181	1,646,665
Graduate course	Graduate school university	45	10,452	2	348	0	0	43	10,104
Graduate course	Regular graduate school	1,129	316,963	230	102,363	10	3,161	889	211,439
Graduate course	Total	1,174	327,415	232	102,711	10	3,161	932	221,543

== English education ==
Korea has an extensive English education history dating back to the Joseon Dynasty. During this time, Koreans received English education in public institutes, where translators were instructed for conversion of Korean into foreign languages. The Public Foreign Language School established in 1893, educated young males to perform tasks to modernize Korea. This school, unlike facilities such as Yuk Young Gong Won (1886), disregarded social statuses, welcoming more students into the institute and introducing the first Korean foreign language instructors into the field of English education.

In 1994, the university entrance examination moved away from testing grammar, towards a more communicative method. Parents redirected the focus of English education to align with exam content. English Language Education programs focus on ensuring competency to perform effectively as a nation in an era of globalization using proficiency-based language programs that allow students to learn according to their own abilities and interests and driving Koreans to focus more on oral proficiency. With the new focus placed on oral expertise, there has been an "intense desire to speak native-like English" pressuring parents to take measures to ensure the most beneficial English education.

Because of large class sizes and other factors in public schools, many parents pay to send their children to private English-language schools in the afternoon or evening. Families invest significant portions of household incomes on the education of children to include English camps and language training abroad. Usually different private English-language schools specialize in teaching elementary school students or in middle and high school students.

The most ambitious parents send their children to kindergartens that utilize English exclusively in the classroom. Many children also live abroad for anywhere from a few months to several years to learn English. Sometimes, a Korean mother and her children will move to an English-speaking country for an extended period of time to enhance the children's English ability. In these cases, the father left in Korea is known as a gireogi appa (기러기 아빠), literally a "goose dad" who must migrate to see his family.

There are more than 100,000 Korean students in the U.S. The increase of 10 percent every year helped Korea remain the top student-sending country in the U.S. for a second year, ahead of India and China. Korean students at Harvard University are the third most after Canadian and Chinese. In 2012, 154,000 South Korean students were pursuing degrees at overseas universities, with countries such as Japan, Canada, the United States, and Australia as top destinations.

Korean English classes focus on vocabulary, grammar, and reading. Academies tend to include conversation, and some offer debate and presentation.

In a 2003 survey conducted by the Hong Kong-based Political and Economic Risk Consultancy, despite being one of the countries in Asia that spent the most money on English-language education, South Korea ranked the lowest among 12 Asian countries in English ability. By 2020, South Korea had significantly improved its English knowledge and proficiency, ranking 6th out of 25 countries in Asia, by Education First.

== Controversy and criticism ==
=== Social stigma against vocational education ===
As university degree grew in prominence to employers during the 1970s and 1980s, the shift toward a more knowledge-based, rather than an industrial economy, resulted in vocational education being devalued in favor of the university when viewed by many young South Koreans and their parents. In the 1970s and 1980s, vocational education in South Korea was less than socially acceptable, yet also a pathway to succeed in obtaining a steady career with a decent income and an opportunity to elevate socioeconomic status. Even with the many positive attributes of vocational education, many vocational graduates were scorned and stigmatized by their college educated managers despite the importance of their expertise and skills in promoting South Korea's economic development.

According to Jasper Kim, a visiting scholar of East Asian studies at Harvard University, "There are a lot of highly educated, arguably over-educated people, but on the flip side, the demand side, they all want to work for a narrow bandwidth of companies, namely the LGs and Samsungs of the world". Kim states that many highly educated South Koreans who don't get selected often become second-class citizens, with fewer opportunities for employment and even marriage.

The negative social stigma associated with vocational careers and not having a university degree was deeply rooted in South Korean society coupled with fading but enduring belief that a university degree from a prestigious university is the only path to a successful career, played a factor in the nation's focus on going to a prestigious university. This caused a necessity for Meister Schools.

To boost the positive image of vocational education and training, the South Korean government has been collaborating with countries such as Germany, Switzerland, and Austria to examine the innovative solutions that are being implemented to improve vocational education, training, and career options for young South Koreans as alternative to the traditional university path.

=== Harm caused by entrance exam-focused competitive education ===
==== Competition in middle school ====
More than 95% of middle school students attend private institutions known as hagwons. Some parents place more stress on their children's hagwon studies than their public school studies.

Many middle school students, like their high school counterparts, return from a day of schooling well after sunset. The average South Korean family was found to have spent 29.2 trillion won per year in 2024, spending more per capita on private tutoring than any other country.

==== Excessive forced night time self study ====
High school students are commonly expected to study increasingly long hours each year moving toward graduation, to become competitive and enter SKY universities (Seoul National University, Korea University, and Yonsei University). In 2019, most high school students slept around 6 hours and 3 minutes, while the average across all grades was around 7 hours and 18 minutes, which is 1 hour less than the OECD average.

=== The practice of excessively prioritizing university entrance ===
A particularly prevalent phenomenon in South Korea is universities being seen as necessary. In 2020, the university enrollment rate was 73.7%, and the university graduation rate for young people of working age (25-34) was 69.3%, which is highest among OECD countries.

==== Hagwons ====
Hagwons, or cram schools, are private institutions for education.

An analysis found that the expensive rates of these private institutions had a correlation to South Korea's low birthrates.

Hagwons have also been found to run as late as midnight up until the year 2010, when the nation adopted a new policy which limited the hours that these institutions could stay open. Hagwons were banned from running classes after 10:00 PM. This policy was introduced in order to allow a more balanced system, mostly by fining many privately run specialty study institutes. However, this is often not conformed to.

==== Special Purpose High Schools ====
Those who supported the abolishment of these schools have pointed out that they have fallen to entrance examination specialized institutions and that they have turned into schools for the elites. The Ministry of Education has found that the annual rates of these schools to be over 10 million Korean wons by average, with the exception of Korean Minjok Leadership Academy, which reached up to 30 million.

==== Excessively high rate of mismatch between jobs and majors ====
- According to Statistics Korea, the correspondence between the major and occupation of the South Korean population is only 36.8%.
- According to the International Labour Organization's 2020 data, South Korea ranks 30th out of 30 OECD countries in terms of 'skill-matching level'. This is the lowest among 30 OECD countries.

=== Students' health ===
South Korea's scarcity of natural resources is often cited as a reason for the rigorousness and fierce competition of its school systems; the academic pressure on its students is arguably the largest in the world. In an article entitled "An Assault Upon Our Children", Se-Woong Koo wrote that "the system's dark side casts a long shadow. Dominated by tiger moms, cram schools and highly authoritarian teachers, South Korean education produces ranks of overachieving students who pay a stiff price in health and happiness. The entire program amounts to child abuse. It should be reformed and restructured without delay."

In a response to the article, educator Diane Ravitch warned against modeling an educational system in which children "exist either to glorify the family or to build the national economy." She argued furthermore that the happiness of South Korean children has been sacrificed, and likened the country's students to "cogs in a national economic machine". A 2014 Lee Ju-ho, the minister representing the Ministry of Education & Science Technology, announced a plan on 8 February 2011, to dispatch un-hired reserve teachers overseas for extra training despite the opposition from the Korean Teachers Union and other public workers in the city-level and the provincial level.

- South Korean schools have a strong tendency to neglect physical education due to the over-emphasis of classroom-based education.
- Primary schools and secondary schools halted saturday schools for extracurricular activities.
- 81% of middle and high schools forbid relationships among students.
- There are concerns of overload of schoolworks and exam preparations that could threaten the students' health and emotions.
- The South Korean education system does not allow any leeways for students' rights. The Superintendent of Seoul Metropolitan Office of Education Kwak No Hyun made a remark how "it is very embarrassing to discuss verbosely about the poor development of students' rights within the South Korean society" during his seminar in March 2011.
- There are concerns about the severe lack of community spirit among South Korean students that comes from examinations as the main educational direction and from an analysis according to Dr. Lee Mi-na from SNU Sociology: "harsh competition-oriented and success-oriented parenting among the parents".
- The Korean Federation of Teachers' Associations announced that 40% of teachers are not satisfied with the loss of teachers' powers in classroom due to the new Teachers' Evaluation System.
- The Ministry of Education and Science, the Ministry of National Defense, and the Korean Federation of Teachers' Association signed an MOU in May 2011 to a verbose national security education to younger kids, in which it potentially violates the UN Children's Rights protocol.
- OECD ranked South Korean elementary, middle, and high school students are the lowest in terms of happiness compared to other OECD countries. This survey echoes similar studies of students in Seoul according to SMOE.
- Dr. Seo Yu-hyeon, a brain expert from Seoul National University Faculty of Medicines, criticized South Korea's private educations among toddlers due to the forceful nature of these educational pursuits that could deteriorate creativity and block any healthy brain development.
- The Korean Educational Development Institute reports that the majority of university students lack the ability to ask questions to instructors, mainly due to the education system that promotes examinations and instructors having too many students to handle.
- A 2011 survey from the Korean Federation of Teachers' Associations found out that 79.5% of the school teachers are not satisfied with their careers, a growing trend for three straight years.
- In 2011, bullying-related sexual abuse was reported, and 41% of school violence was left unpunished.
- The government banned coffee in all schools in a bid to improve children's health. The ban came into force in September 2018.

== See also ==
- Education in North Korea
- Gifted education in South Korea
- Seoul Metropolitan Office of Education
- Student and university culture in South Korea
- South Korea's college entrance system
- List of universities and colleges in South Korea
- International rankings of South Korea#Education
