= Seoul Metropolitan Office of Education =

- Korean name
- Hangul: 서울특별시교육청
- Hanja: 서울特別市敎育廳
- Revised Romanization: Seoul Teukbyeolsi Gyoyukcheong
- McCune–Reischauer: Sŏul T'ŭkpyŏlsi Kyoyukch'ŏng

The Seoul Metropolitan Office of Education (SMOE) is a school board in Seoul, South Korea. It was established on October 2, 1956.

== History ==
The SMOE and the Gyeonggi-do Office of Education have suffered from a huge surge of teachers who voluntarily resigned in 2011 and beyond due to increased frequency of teachers' evaluation tests and difficulties of managing students.

== Timeline ==
- October 2, 1956 – Seoul Board of Education inaugurated (2 bureaus, 7 divisions)
- May 16, 1961 – The Board of Education dissolved
- January 13, 1962 – Education Autonomy Policy abolished. Absorbed into Seoul Metropolitan Government as Bureau of Education
- January 1, 1964 – Education Autonomy Policy and Seoul Board of Education re-established with 2 bureaus and 7 divisions
- December 30, 1972 – District offices of education established (Dongbu, Seobu, Nambu, Bukbu). The position of Vice-Superintendent and two divisions (Physical Education and Administrative Finance) created (2 bureaus, 9 divisions)
- February 27, 1980 – Two district offices of education (Jungbu, Gangnam) established
- February 23, 1983 – Dongjak district office of education established
- September 3, 1987 – Two district offices of education (Gangdong, Gangseo) established
- May 26, 1991 – The Seoul Board of Education, consultative executive body, divided into two separate bodies
- September 2, 1991 – The 1st Seoul Metropolitan Board of Education commenced
- February 22, 1996 – Two district offices of education (Sungdong, Sungbuk) established
- July 1, 2009 – Office of Innovation and Welfare Support renamed to Office of Education Welfare
- January 1, 2015 – Organizational restructuring (1 Office, 3 Bureaus, 7 Divisions, 13 Divisions)

== Location ==
The mailing address for SMOE is 2-77 Sinmunno 2-ga, Songwol-Gil 48, Jongno-gu, Seoul, Republic of Korea.

== See also ==
- Education in South Korea
