= History of education in Korea =

The history of education in Korea can be traced back to the Three Kingdoms of Korea, or even back to the prehistoric period. Both private schools and public schools were prominent. Public education was established as early as the 400 AD. Historically, the education has been heavily influenced by Confucianism and Buddhism.

== Prehistoric and Gojoseon period ==
Education in the prehistoric times mostly consisted of hunting, fishing, toolmaking, and combat. Through those lessons, people were taught to be members of society. Since the prehistoric education was based on protection from nature, it was unorganized. Such education eventually led to the first religious beliefs. In Korea, the ideas lead to the development of the idea of Samsin (Korea: 삼신, Hanja:三神, English: Three Gods) along with the Korean versions of animism and shamanism. However, there was no particular religion involved and the education relied on anecdotal teachings.

In the Gojoseon period (?-108 BC), many of the factors in the prehistoric education still remained, but an earlier frame of society was established, along with social morality. The earliest traces of education can be seen in Samguk Yusa. Passages of the book show evidence of agriculture, punishment, morality, and medicine. Korea's first educational slogan is Hongik Ingan (홍익인간; 弘益人間). It means to 'live and work for the benefit of all mankind".' The first system of law is written in the Book of Han. In this period, the education was made to benefit the society as a whole.

== Three Kingdoms and Unified Silla period ==
In the period of the Three Kingdoms of Korea (57–688 AD), the governments began to institute education. The education system was heavily influenced by Confucianism and Buddhism.

=== Goguryeo period ===
Goguryeo was established from 37 BC to 668 AD. From its establishment, it was already using a form of writing. It is best demonstrated by the book Yoogi(유기; 留記). The first established institution was Taehak (태학; 太學), also called Daehak. It was established at 372 AD. The institute was mainly used by the Yangban class. It was established with Confucianism as its philosophy of education. Later, Buddhism was added to its curriculum. It taught both the humanities and martial arts. There was also another institute called Gyungdang. It is thought to be established at 372 AD.

=== Baekje period ===
Baekje was established from 18 BC to 660 AD. Evidence of the scholarly method can be seen through the Japanese books of Nihon Shoki and Kojiki. It can also be seen through cultural exchanges with Japan, such as the transference of the books the Analects and the Thousand Character Classic at 258 AD. Further evidence of education is shown in the history book Seugi (서기; 書記)

There are no records of an established institution. However, references to an establishment can be seen through various posts establishing relations with Japan. The Consulate General of the Republic of Korea holds that educational institutions were found earlier than 372 AD.

=== Silla ===
==== Three Kingdoms period ====
Silla was established in the Three Kingdoms period from 57 BC to 668 AD. The government mostly focused on the martial arts because of the invasions from the surrounding kingdoms. The main educational institute is considered to be Hwarang.

==== Unified Silla period ====
Unified Silla was established from 668 AD to 935 AD. Education besides Hwarang began to be established after foreign influence. There were several student exchange programs with China. The major establishment is Gukhak (국학; 國學). The curriculum was directly taken from the system of the Tang dynasty. It was established at 682 AD. Most of the subjects were humanities.

== Goryeo period ==
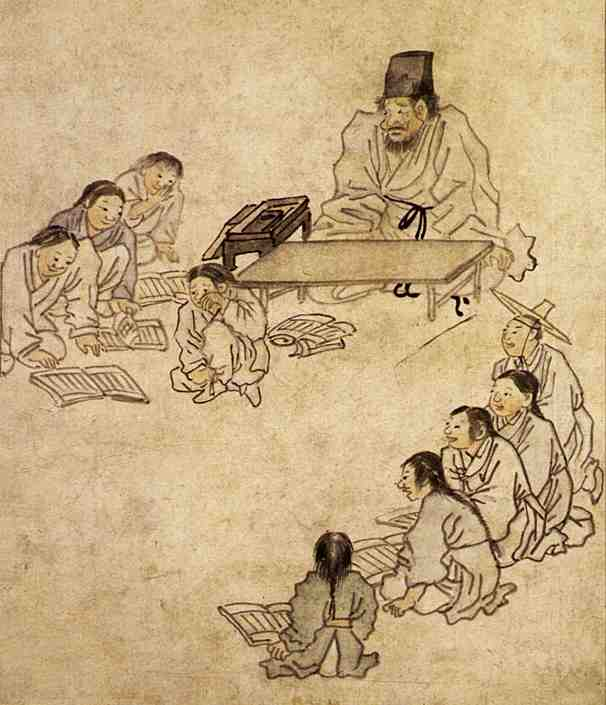
The picture titled "Seodang" drawn by Kim Hongdo in the late 18th century.

The Goryeo dynasty was established from 935 to 1392 AD. As the country's official religion, Buddhism had enormous impact. However, Confucianism was used as the main idea for the philosophical and social structure. During the rule of Gwangjong of Goryeo (925 – 975 AD), the gwageo (과거; 科擧) examination system was strengthened due to the influences of Confucianism. The first concrete policy based on Confucianism was created during the reign of Seongjong of Goryeo (r. 981–997 AD). In 986 AD, education was expanded to the rural areas. There is a record of a policy on 1127 AD to establish a public school in each district. The public curriculum was based on books such as the Classic of Filial Piety and the Analects. There was also an annual final examination.

There were two major types of education in this period: Gwanhak (관학; 官學) and Sahak (사학; 私學). Gwanhak is defined as schools established and managed by the government. Major Gwanhak institutions include Gukjagam and Hakdang (학당; 學堂) in the cities and Hyanggyo in the rural areas. The government also established public libraries such as Bisuhwon (비서원; 秘書院) and Susuhwon (수서원; 修書院) to support educational efforts. Gukjagam was established on 992 AD as the first university in the country. It was regulated by social class and rank and played a major role in establishing future institutions.

Sahak is defined as schools not established and not controlled by the government. Major Sahak institutions include Sibido (십이도; 十二徒) and Seodang (서당; 書堂). Even though Sibido was considered a Sahak, it was controlled by the government. It was closed down on 1391 AD.

== Joseon period ==
The Joseon dynasty was established from 1392 to 1910 AD. At the end of the Goryeo dynasty, Buddhism began to lose political influence. Instead, Confucianism became the official philosophy of the dynasty. Following this idea, Yangban's education was valued more than commoner's education. Education also focused on gaining rank and personal cultivation. The humanities was valued while vocational education was belittled. This idea has been credited with establishing a system of ethics for the entire country and contributing to Korea's philosophy of education as a whole.

Higher education institutions included Sungkyunkwan (Korean: 성균관) in Seoul, which had the role of a university. Secondary education institutions included Sahak (사학; 四學) in the cities and Hyanggyo in the rural areas. Private schools included Shuyuan and the primary education institution Seodang. However, these institutions were independent instead of being systematic. Seodang was seen as a preparation for Sahak or Hyanggyo.

The educational curriculum was managed by the Ministry of Rites from the Six Ministries of Joseon. Educational policies such as Gyeongguk daejeon (경국대전; 經國大典) were implemented for the management and supervision of the educational institutions. Government subsidies such as cultivated land, rice, and fish were given, and privileges such as tax exemption were granted. During the reign of Taejo of Joseon (r. 1392–98 AD), Hyanggyo was especially supported. In 1398, the Goryeo-era Sungkyunkwan institute was renovated for Confucianism education. The student population was expanded from 100 to 200. Organized student events were held, and students' opinions were encouraged.

In 1411, four institutions named Sahak (사학; 四學) were established, which differed from the Goryeo-era Sahak. Annually, 20 students from each school in Sahak were tested for a governmental position; this system was called Seungbo (승보; 陞補). In 1477, a 30-month tenure was implemented for Sahak. During the reign of Hyojong of Joseon (1649 – 59 AD), policies created by scholars with Song Jun-gil as the head were accepted as Sahak policies. On 1335 AD, schools were inspected under the government. Each region was mandated a school. On 1550 AD, the basis for Seowon was created. However, Seowons began to have negative influences on education and the government closed down all but 47 Seowons by 1868.

There was a school for the royal family called Joghak (종학; 宗學). It was established on 1429 AD.

== 19th century ==
In the late 19th century, the government, patriots, and foreign missionaries began to establish schools adopted to contemporary culture. The education in this period focused on the right to education and the social equality of education. 19th century education began with the establishment of the Gwanhaks Dongmunhak (동문학; 同文學) and Youkyoungongwon (육영공원; 育英公院). Dongmunhak served as a training center for translators, and Youkyoungongwon served as a school for the Yangbans. Sahaks established in this period can be divided into two types: Christian schools and civilian schools.

In 1894, along with the Gabo Reform, education policy was changed. The Gwageo was replaced with the institution Hakmuahmoon (학무아문; 學務衙門). In July 1894, specialized schools were established and students were assigned by the discretion of the Hakmuahmoon. Around 1894, Gojong of the Korean Empire officially promulgated that modern education should be accepted. Further clarifications and additions to the policy was made in 1895.

Along with the Gabo education reform led by the central government, passions and efforts toward building modern education in every town was blooming in Korea, led by reform-minded civilian leaders.

=== Notable schools ===
The first civilian school was established in 1883. The school was called Wonsanhaksa (원산학사; 元山學舍). In 1885, Baejaehakdang (배재학당) was established by Henry Appenzeller. It was a secondary school and the goal was to develop Christians and people to work for the government. In 1886, Ewhahakdang (이화학당) was established by M.F. Scranton. It is the first women-only educational institute to be established. In 1886, Gyungshin School (경신학교) was established by H.H. Underwood. The school developed into the present-day Yonsei University. In 1895, Heungha School (흥화학교; 興化學校) was established by Min Yeong-hwan to teach English, Japanese, and surveying techniques. In 1899, Jumjin School was established by An Chang-ho.

== Japanese rule (1910–1945) ==
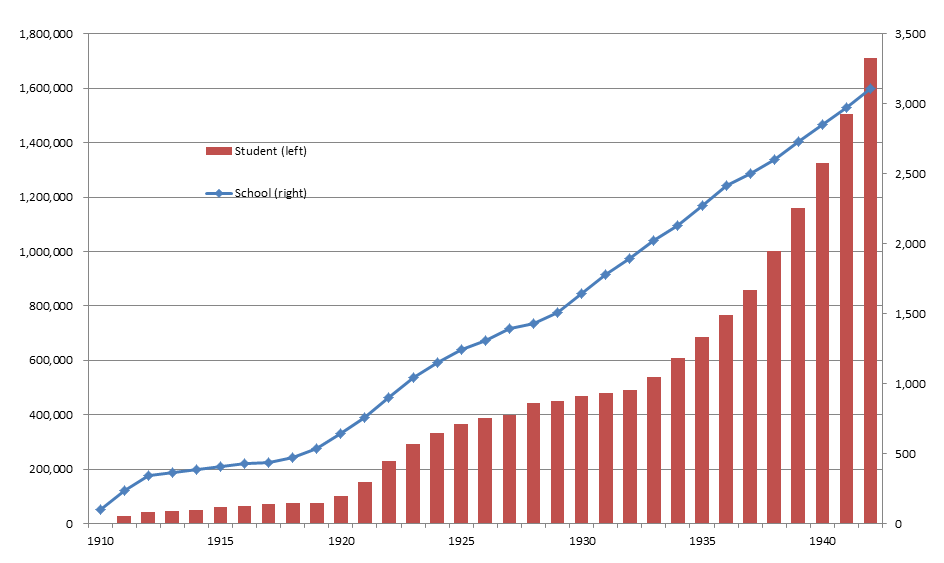
The number of public regular schools(공립보통학교) and students under Japanese rule, 1910–1940

Enrollment rate of public regular schools

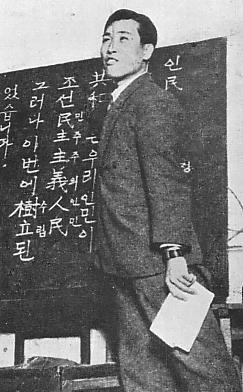
Korean Ethnic Education in the 20th century

The first policy in this period is reflected in the Joseon Education Decree (조선교육령; 朝鮮敎育令) and Private School Regulation (사립학교규칙) decreed in 1911. Joseon Education Decree is interpreted to have the purpose of obliterating all Korean cultural and spiritual independence to keep Koreans colonized forever. After the decrees, various policies established the education system to have three to four years of botong school (보통학교; 普通學校), a type of primary education; four years of godeung botong school (고등보통학교; 高等普通學校) and girls-only godeung botong school (여자고등보통학교; 女子高等普通學校), both forms of secondary education; two to three years of sileop school (실업학교; 實業學校) and gani sileop school (간이실업학교) with no particular limit, both forms of vocational schools; jeonmun school (전문학교; 專門學校), a form of tertiary education.

Botong school focused on reading, writing, and arithmetic. The subjects Susin (수신), Korean, Japanese, hanja, and arithmetic were required. The school served more for as preparations for jobs, not for higher education. Godong botong school also focused on job training. Subjects included Susin, Korean, Hanja, and Japanese. As of 1915, there were 399 botong schools, 56,253 male botong school students, and 5,976 female botong school students compared to 291 Japanese primary schools, 31,142 male Japanese primary school students, and 28,206 female Japanese primary school students. 30% of the instructors in botong schools were Japanese, and 60% in godong botong schools.

For private schools, the Decree concerning private schools (사립학교령) was decreed in 1908. The decree was modified in 1911. In 1915, Modification of the regulation of private schools (개정사립학교규칙) was decreed. The decrees applied to all private schools. They promulgated that the purpose of the establishment of schools, head teachers, teachers, and textbooks must be regulated by the Empire of Japan. Moreover, the subjects of geography, history, and the Bible was prohibited. Consequently, the number of private schools decreased, from 1,973 in 1910 to 1,317 in 1912, 1,240 in 1914, and 690 in 1919.

The educational policies were modified after the March 1st Movement on March 1, 1919. The modified policies were promulgated on 1922. The educational policies for students speaking Japanese and Korean were separately created. Korean students were permitted to study in normal schools (사범학교; 師範學校). The quality of education as a whole also increased. The length of botong school was increased from four to six years. The subject of the Korean language, which had been abolished in some schools, changed to become a required subject. More schools were also established.

When nationalistic leaders called for establishments of Minlip Daehak (민립 대학; 民立大學), the Japanese government made compromises to establish universities under the control of the government. As a direct consequence, Rules concerning the establishment of Keijō Imperial University (경성제국대학설치에 관한 법률) was promulgated in 1922. Although such policies were similar to the Japanese curriculum, the focus of the curriculum was to strengthen the Japanese education while diminishing Korean culture. This argument is supported by the facts that the time for the teaching of the Japanese language was two to three times longer than the time to teach the Korean language in primary and secondary education systems as well as the teachings of history of Japan and the geography of Japan.

In March 1938, the third Joseon Education Degree was promulgated by Jirō Minami. All Japanese elements were strengthened and the courses were forced to be taught in the Japanese language. The main points in this decree were that the names of schools were changed in the style of the Japanese language: "botong school" was changed to "simsang primary school" (심상소학교); "godeung botong school" to "middle school" (중학교); "girls-only godeung botong school" to "godeung girls' school" (고등여학교).

The Korean language was changed to an elective course, which meant its eventual end. "Simsang primary school" was renamed to "citizen's school" (국민학교; 國民學校) in 1941. In 1943, the Decree concerning education during wartime (교육에 관한 전시비상조치령) changed the education system to fit the war preparation. Consequent decrees modified the education entirely for war. Due to the changes, almost all the students were compelled to become soldiers and the schools were practically closed down.
