= Choe Bu =

Korean official (1454–1504)

- Hangul: 최부
- Hanja: 崔溥
- RR: Choe Bu
- MR: Ch'oe Pu

Art name
- Hangul: 금남
- Hanja: 錦南
- RR: Geumnam
- MR: Kŭmnam

Choe Bu (Korean: 최부, 1454–1504) was a Korean diarist, historian, politician, and travel writer during the early Joseon Dynasty. He was most well known for the account of his shipwrecked travels in China from February to July 1488, during the Ming dynasty (1368–1644). He was eventually banished from the Joseon court in 1498 and executed in 1504 during two political purges. However, in 1506 he was exonerated and given posthumous honors by the Joseon court.

Choe's diary accounts of his travels in China became widely printed during the 16th century in both Korea and Japan. Modern historians also refer to his written works, since his travel diary provides a unique outsider's perspective on Chinese culture in the 15th century. The attitudes and opinions expressed in his writing represent in part the standpoints and views of the 15th century Confucian Korean literati, who viewed Chinese culture as compatible with and similar to their own. His description of cities, people, customs, cuisines, and maritime commerce along China's Grand Canal provides insight into the daily life of China and how it differed between northern and southern China during the 15th century.

== Official career ==
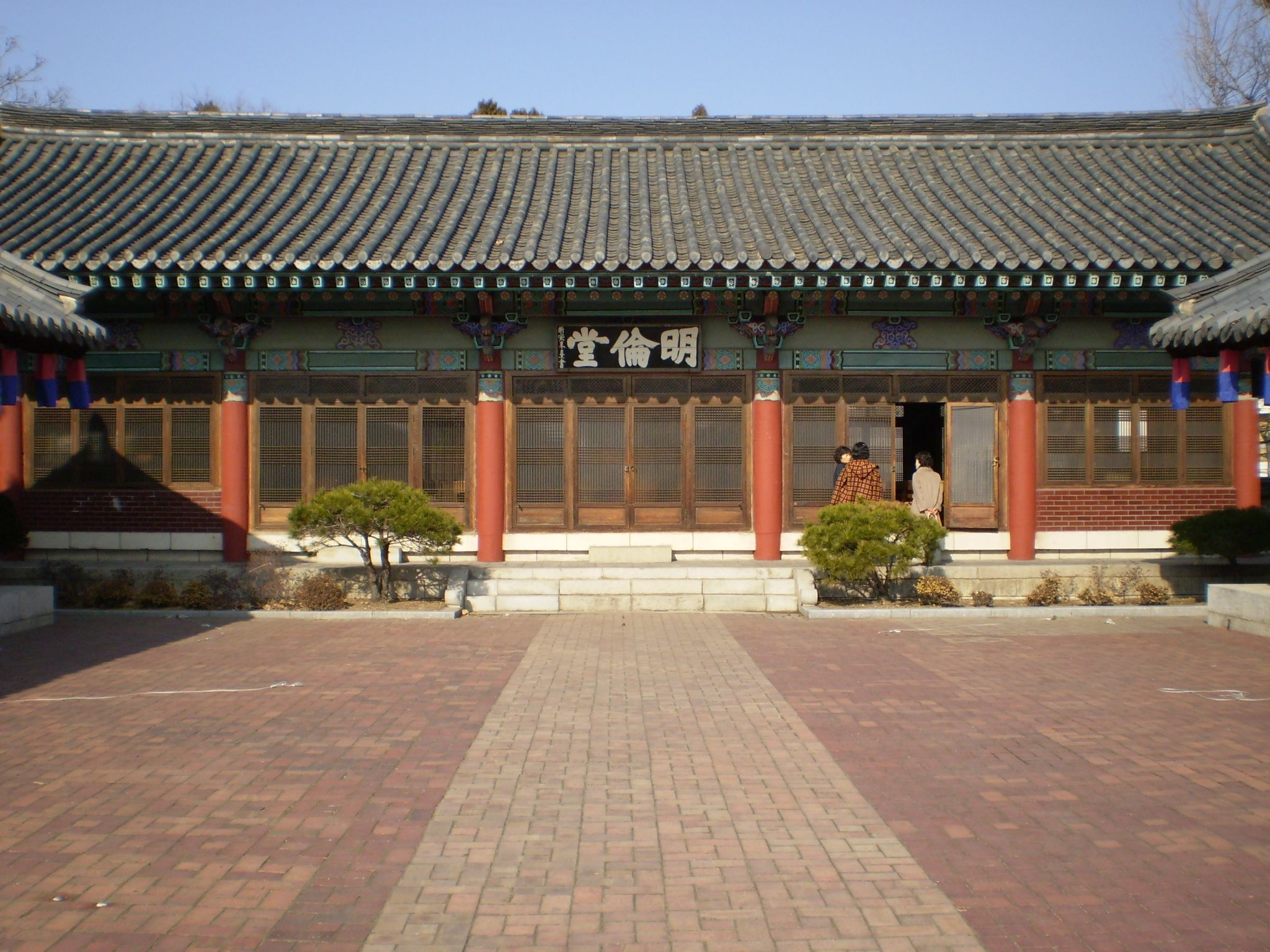
The hyanggyo of Daegu; the hyanggyo were government-run educational facilities where students were educated for civil service.

Choe Bu of the Tamjin Choe clan was born in 1454 in the prefectural town of Naju in Jeollanam-do, Korea. Choe passed the jinsa examinations in 1477, which was a lower examination that did not immediately ensure a post in government; rather, it permitted enrollment in the National Academy, or Seonggyungwan, where he could study further for the higher mungwa examinations. In preparation for the exams, he studied the Five Classics as Confucian students had for centuries, but he also was taught the emphasis of the Four Books of Zhu Xi (1130–1200), which was in line with the Neo-Confucian doctrine first accepted in mainstream Chinese education during the mid-13th century. He passed his first civil service examination in 1482 and a second civil service examination in 1486, qualifying him for an immediate post in government. In a career as a graduate scholar-official that spanned 18 years, Choe was privileged with various positions. He held posts in the Hodang Library, printing office, and the National Academy. He also held posts involving the military, such as on the military supplies commission, with the office of the inspector-general, and with the Yongyang garrison. The culmination of his career was his promotion as a minister of the Directorate of Ceremonies in the capital, a distinguished office. Choe Bu was also one of the scholars who aided in the compilation of the Dongguk Tonggam in 1485, a history of Korea from ancient times. Choe was learned in Confucian ethics, Chinese letters, Chinese poetry, and well versed in Korean history, geography, and famous people; all this later helped him to dispel the notion of some Chinese officials that he was a Japanese pirate rather than a Korean official who had unfortunately shipwrecked in China. In 1487, Choe Bu was sent to Jeju Island to check the registers for escaped slaves from the mainland.

== A castaway in China, 1488 ==
=== Southern China ===
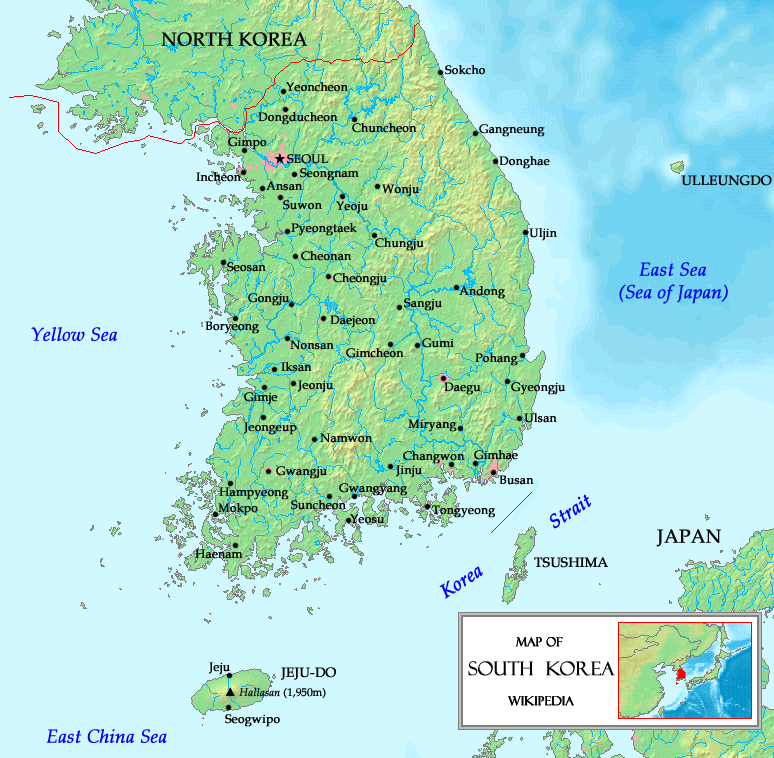
Map of the Korean Peninsula with Jeju Island located towards the bottom left in the East China Sea

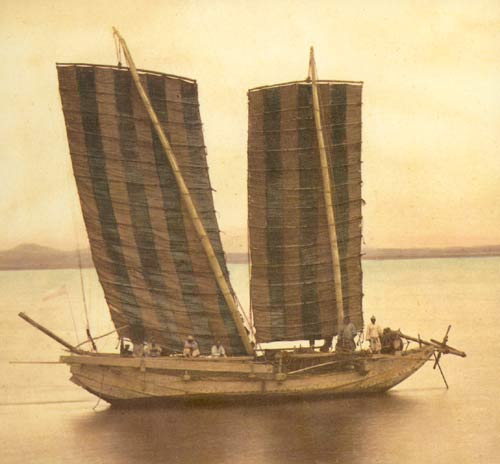
An 1871 photo of a Korean junk ship

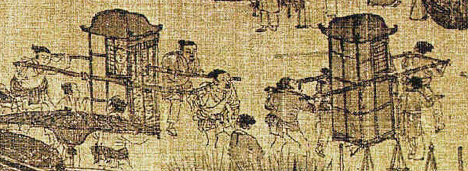
A scene from a 12th-century painting by the Song dynasty artist Zhang Zeduan, showing people carried in Chinese litters, the same which Choe and his officers were carried around in while traversing through Zhejiang

While serving his post in Jeju as the Commissioner of Registers for the island, a family slave from Naju arrived on 12 February 1488 to alert Choe that his father had died. In keeping with his Confucian values, Choe prepared to leave his post immediately and begin the period of mourning for the loss of his father. However, while sailing to mainland Korea with a crew of 43 Koreans, Choe's ship was blown far off course during a violent storm that lasted 14 days, his ship aimlessly drifting off towards China until reaching the Chinese coast off of Taizhou, Zhejiang, near Ningbo. Before reaching the shores of Zhejiang, Choe wrote on the fifth day of his travel at sea during the storm:

This day a dense fog obscured everything. Things a foot away could not be made out. Towards evening, rain streamed down heavily, abating somewhat with night. The frightening waves were like mountains. They would lift the ship up into the blue sky and then drop it as if down an abyss. They billowed and crashed, the noise splitting heaven from earth. We might all be drowned and left to rot at any moment.

Upon the urging of his crewmen, Choe changed his clothes in a ritual fashion in preparation for death, although he prayed to the heavens to spare him and his crew, asking what sins they had committed to deserve this fate. On the sixth day, during fairer weather, their ship came upon a group of islands in the Yellow Sea where Chinese pirates were moored. The pirates robbed their ship of spare goods and rations, threw away the Koreans' oars and anchor, and left them to drift aimlessly into the sea.

Although it was still raining heavily, Choe's crew spotted a near-deserted strip of Zhejiang coastline on 28 February. Almost immediately, his ship was surrounded by six Chinese boats, the crews of which did not attempt to board Choe's ship until the following day. Although he could not speak Chinese, Choe was able to communicate with the Chinese in written Chinese in what are dubbed "brush conversations". Through writing, he questioned these Chinese sailors on how far the nearest official road and courier route was. When given three different estimates of the distance from there to the Taizhou prefectural capital, Choe was convinced that his hosts were deceiving him; historian Timothy Brook notes that it was more likely ignorance and inexperience of traveling inland than mere deception on behalf of the Chinese sailors. Regardless, the Chinese sailors began robbing the Korean ship of its remaining goods, convinced that they were Japanese pirates. When heavy rains inundated the region once more, the Chinese sailors returned to their ships; Choe's party, fearing for their lives should the sailors board their ship again, saw this as an opportune moment and made a dash for the shore under cover of rain. After traveling several days overland looking for the nearest courier route, Choe's party was found by Chinese authorities and taken to Taizhou Battalion. Like in the previous incident with the Chinese sailors and villagers along the shore, the Koreans were almost killed when they were first encountered by Chinese soldiers. Employing his wit and intellect in these dangerous confrontations of being misconstrued as a coastal pirate, Choe avoided disaster for him and his crew.

The battalion commander at Taizhou ordered his officer Zhai Yong to escort Choe Bu's Korean party to the regional command centre at Shaoxing on 6 March. From there they could be transferred to provincial authorities at Hangzhou and finally to the empire's capital of Beijing where the party could be officially escorted back to Korea. Choe Bu and his officers were carried in sedan chairs, an accommodation provided by the Taizhou Battalion, although in spots of rough terrain Choe Bu and his officers were forced to walk on foot like the others.

The battalion troops escorting Choe and his Korean party reached Jiantiao Battalion on 8 March; on the next day, they travelled by boat across Sanmen Bay to reach the Yuexi Police Station and Post House. On 10 March, the party travelled along the postal route to Baiqiao Station, a courier centre between Taizhou and Ningbo prefectures. The courier officials were eager to see the Koreans off, since a party of 43 was a somewhat large group for a courier station to provide sudden accommodations for.

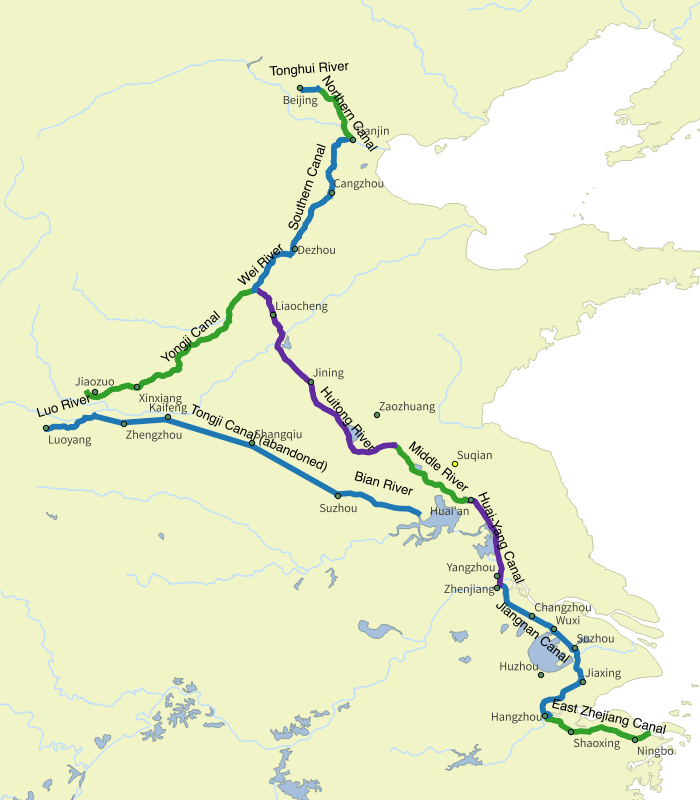
The course of the Grand Canal; from Ningbo to Beijing, Choe Bu's escort party traveled a total distance of 2,340 km (1,450 mi) in 49 days of travel.

In a daylong trip, the party reached the next station located 35 km (22 mi) north by the second watch of the night. Heavy rains and wind made further advance impossible, but despite rain on the next day, Zhai Yong urged Choe and the Koreans to push on regardless, explaining that the regulations for prompt arrival times in China's courier system were very stringent. The party covered another 35 km (22 mi) on 11 March, completely soaked by the rain when they reached the next station. The station master provided the party with a small fire to keep warm, but a man who thought the Koreans were captured pirates barged in and kicked their fire out in a rage. Zhai Yong dutifully wrote an account of this assault and passed it on to the county magistrate's office before having the party continue en route to their destination on the following day, 12 March. They reached the Beidu River on that day, boarding ships that would lead them to the Grand Canal, the central courier and trade artery of China that would carry them all the way to Beijing. At this point, water transport was the preferable means of travel for the courier agents; Choe wrote "all envoys, tribute, and commerce come and go by water. If either the water in the locks and rivers is too shallow because of drought to let boats pass or there is a very urgent matter, the overland route is taken." When the party reached Ningbo on that day, Choe Bu remarked on the beautiful scenery; when they reached Cixi City, he noted the city's many markets and cluttering of warships; upon entering Ningbo and reaching the Supreme Piracy-Defense Office, Choe wrote that the gates and crowds there were three times as great as at Cixi.

After interrogating Choe Bu and Zhai Yong, Zhai was punished with a flogging for the recent fire-kicking incident, which officials of Ningbo cited as evidence of his lack of command. Yet that wasn't the only offense; Zhai was flogged again when the party reached Hangzhou, since he failed to meet the deadline in reaching his destination while escorting the Koreans. The standard punishment was 20 strokes for a day's delay, with an additional stroke for every subsequent three days of delay and a maximum of 60. Although this was perhaps a damper on their travel affair, Choe was impressed with the sights of Hangzhou, writing:

It truly seems a different world, as people say ... Houses stand in solid rows, and the gowns of the crowds seem like screens. The markets pile up gold and silver; the people amass beautiful clothes and ornaments. Foreign ships stand as thick as the teeth of a comb, and in the streets wine shops and music halls front directly each on another.

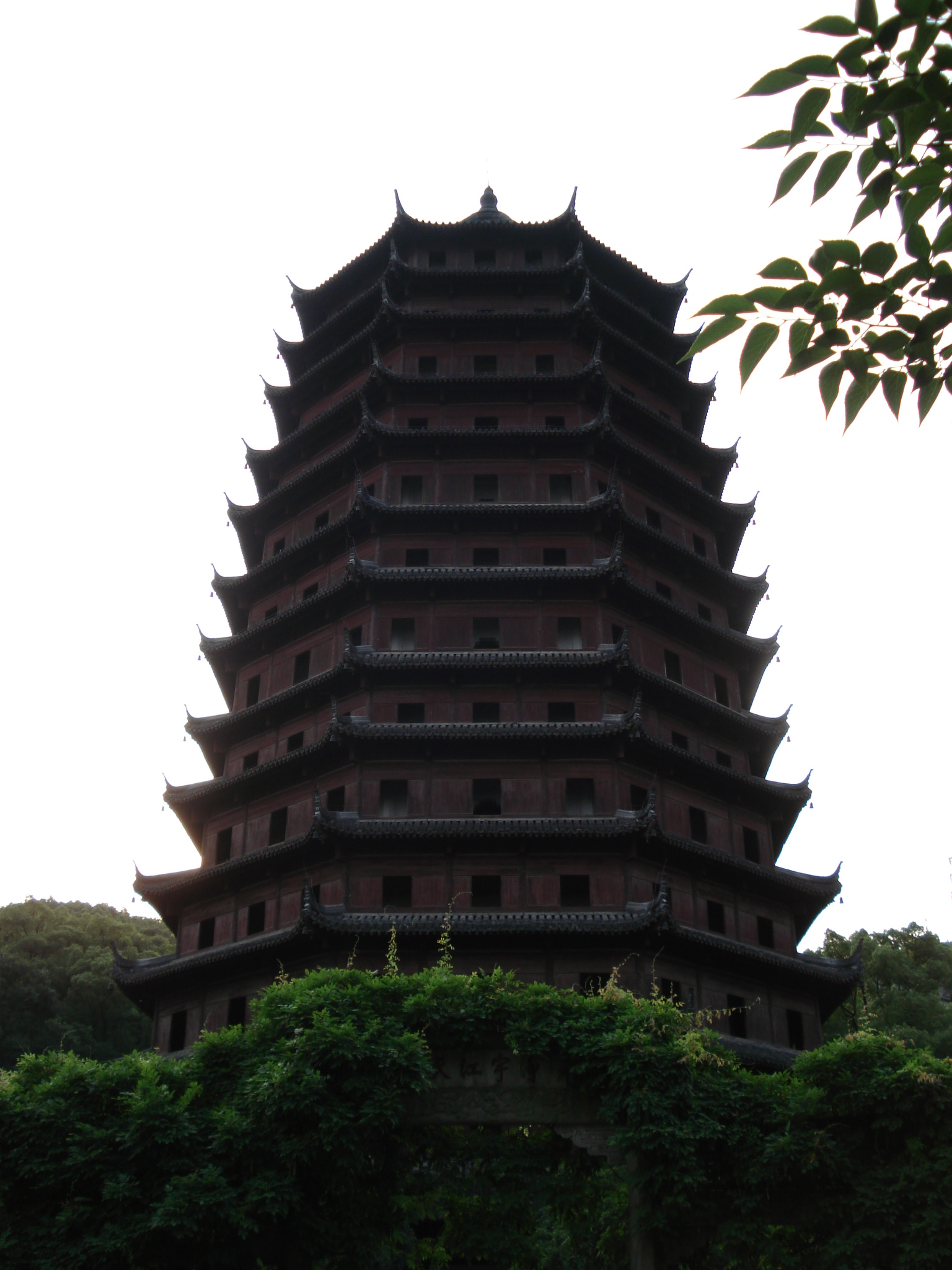
The Liuhe Pagoda of Hangzhou, built by 1165 during the Song dynasty

Brook states that Choe correctly observed the fact that Hangzhou was the central trade city where ships from areas throughout southeast China congregated to take goods into the Jiangnan region, the hotbed of commercial activity in China. Due to the hai jin laws, the Ming government was the only entity allowed to conduct foreign trade; regardless of this prohibition, Choe was informed of the rampant illegal smuggling that passed through Hangzhou, bringing in sandalwood, pepper, and perfumes from Southeast Asia and the Indian Ocean. Yet this was a risky pursuit, as Choe was made aware that half the ships that engaged in this business did not return. On 23 March, the Hangzhou prefectural government granted Choe's party a new escort, an official document explaining their presence in China, and lofty provisions of food and other items that were complements of the transport offices in charge of large-scale national transportation needs. The party stayed in Hangzhou for another two days before departing on 25 March. The reason for the delay was due to courier officials' dutiful following of the handbook Bureaucratic System of the Ming Dynasty (Da Ming guanzhi), which was used to calculate through geomantic principles which days were auspicious to depart on and which days were not. The Europeans, too, became aware of such divination practices later in the 16th century: Mendoza's History of the great and mighty kingdom of China and the situation thereof (published 1585) mentions that among the Chinese books purchased by the Spanish Augustinian friar Martín de Rada in Fujian in 1575 were some that discussed how to "cast lottes when they beginne any journey ...".

Traveling 50 km (31 mi) on average per day, it would take the party 43 days from 25 March to 9 May to travel from Hangzhou to Beijing; even though the party spent a day's time in Suzhou, they still beat their deadline by two days, since 45 km (28 mi) was the courier system's standard traveling distance per day.

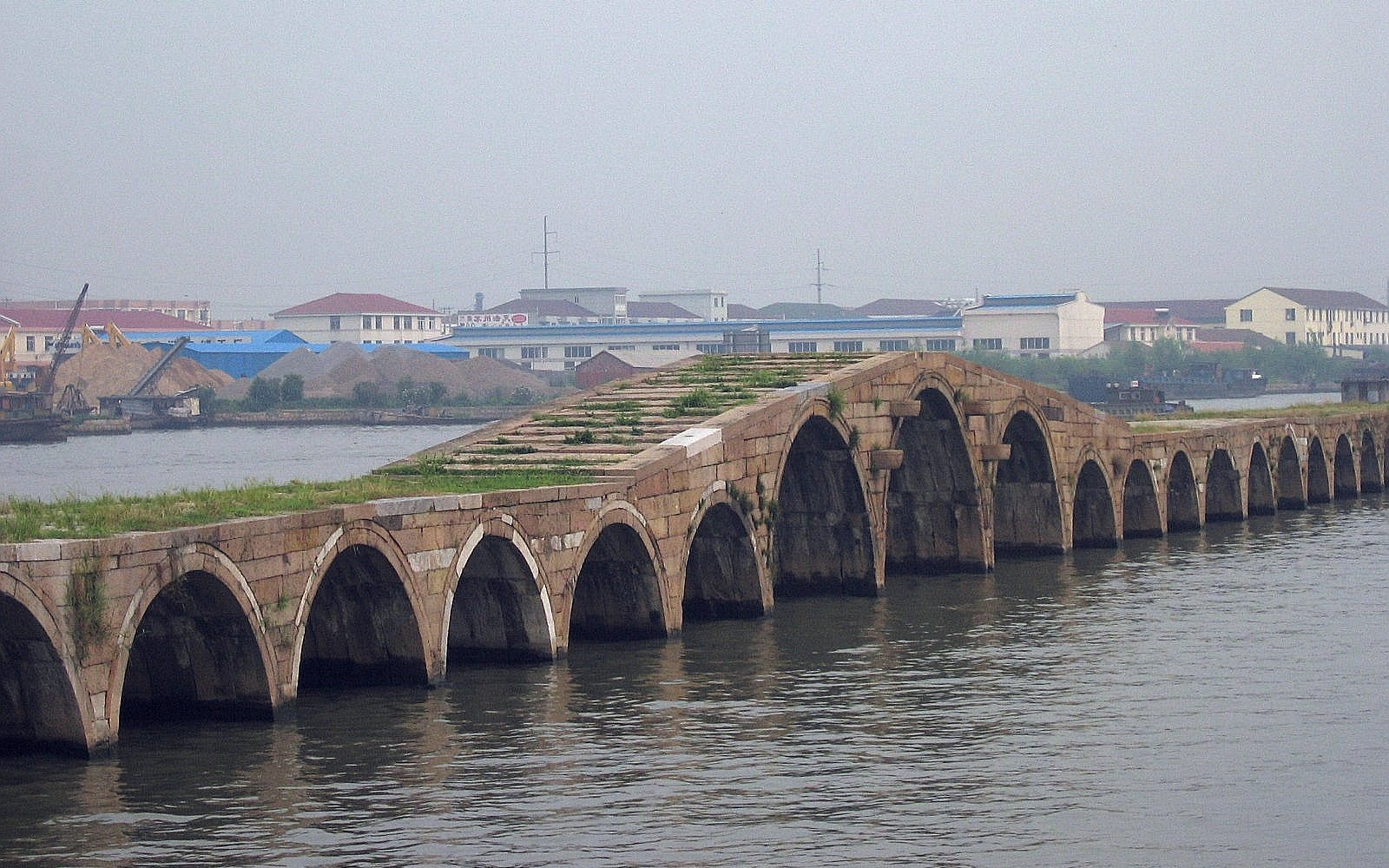
The Precious Belt Bridge of Suzhou, built in 1446 during the Ming dynasty

Choe Bu observed that, despite Hangzhou's greatness, it was no competition for Suzhou, while the former was merely a supplemental commercial feeder that served to enrich the Jiangnan region. After visiting Suzhou on 28 March, Choe Bu remarked on this economic hub of the southeast:

Shops and markets one after another lined both river banks, and merchant junks were crowded together. It was well called an urban center of the southeast ... All the treasures of land and sea, such as thin silks, gauzes, gold, silver, jewels, crafts, arts, and rich and great merchants are there [and] ... merchantmen and junks from Henan, Hebei, and Fujian gather like clouds.

Describing the suburban sprawl around Suzhou and other cities of the Yangzi delta, Choe wrote (note, one li here is equal to 1.7 km or 1.05 miles): "Often for as much as twenty li around them, village gates crowd the ground, markets line the roads, towers look out on other towers, and boats ply stem to stern."

=== Northern China ===
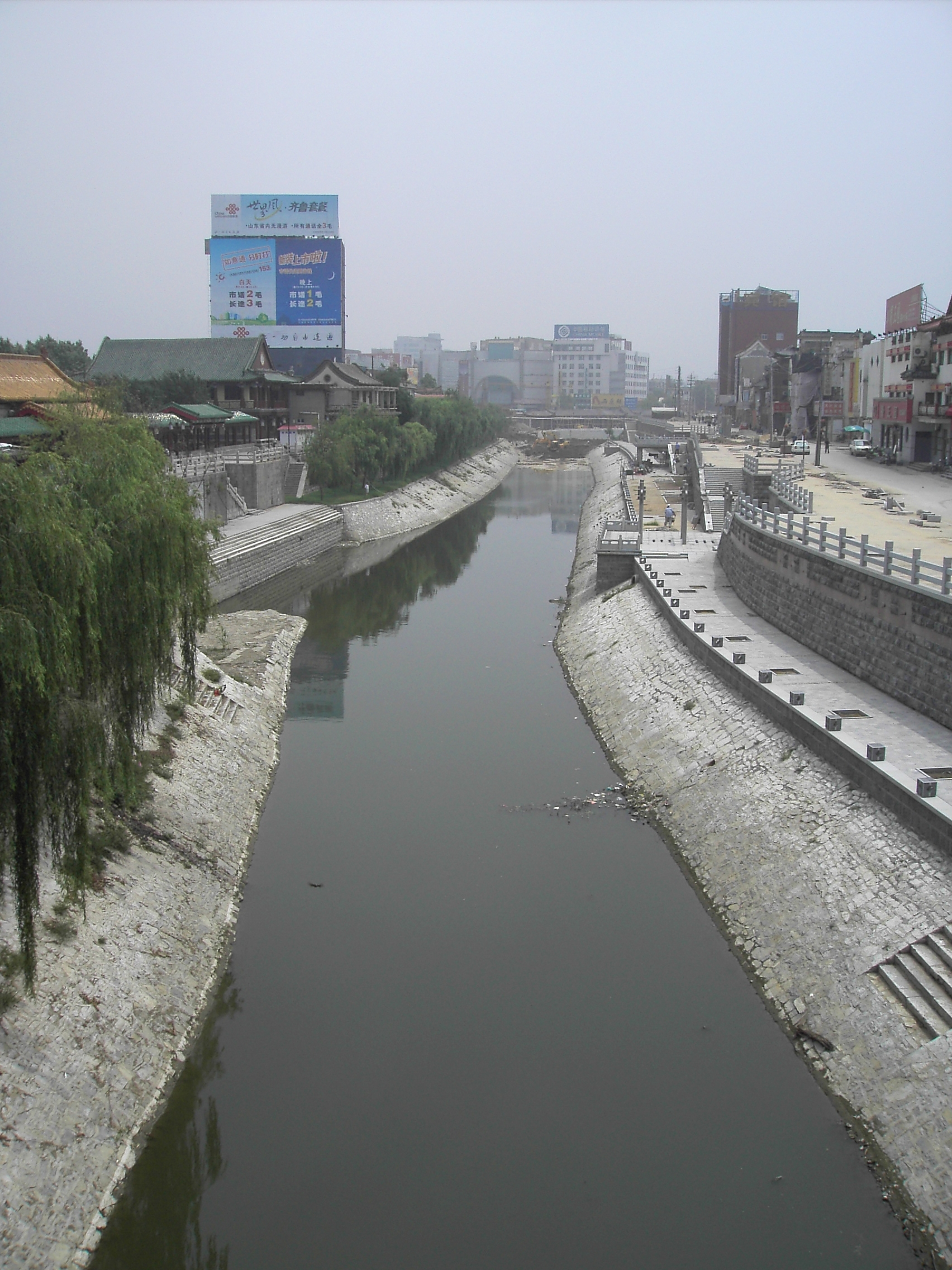
Grand Canal section of modern Jining, Shandong

After departing from Suzhou and continuing up the Grand Canal, Choe's party reached the Lüliang Rapids on 13 April, which interrupted canal traffic in the northern part of South Zhili. He wrote that teams of ten oxen were used to pull their boats through the rapids, while teams of 100 men were used at the next stage of river rapids, the Xuzhou Rapids. He noted the pound locks here that controlled water levels in sections of the canal for safe passage of ships. He described the bustling cities of Linqing and Dezhou in the northern province of Shandong, although he stated that the merchant activity and sizes of these two cities did not match the grandeur of Hangzhou and Suzhou in the south. In fact, Choe remarked that only these two and a handful of other cities in northern China matched the prosperity of southern China, stating that the north was quite poverty-stricken and underdeveloped compared with the south. He also believed that southern Chinese displayed a finer degree of cultivation, social order, literacy, and industriousness than those from the north. Choe wrote that while people of the south were well-dressed and had plenty to spare, people in the north often lacked supplies of everything and feared bandits. Brook writes:

At the end of [Cho'e Bu's] diary he presents a litany of depressing contrasts: spacious tile-roofed houses south of the Yangzi, thatch-roof hovels north; sedan chairs south, horses and donkeys north; gold and silver in the markets south, copper cash north; diligence in farming, manufacturing, and commerce south, indolence north; pleasant dispositions south, quarrelsome tempers north; education south, illiteracy north.

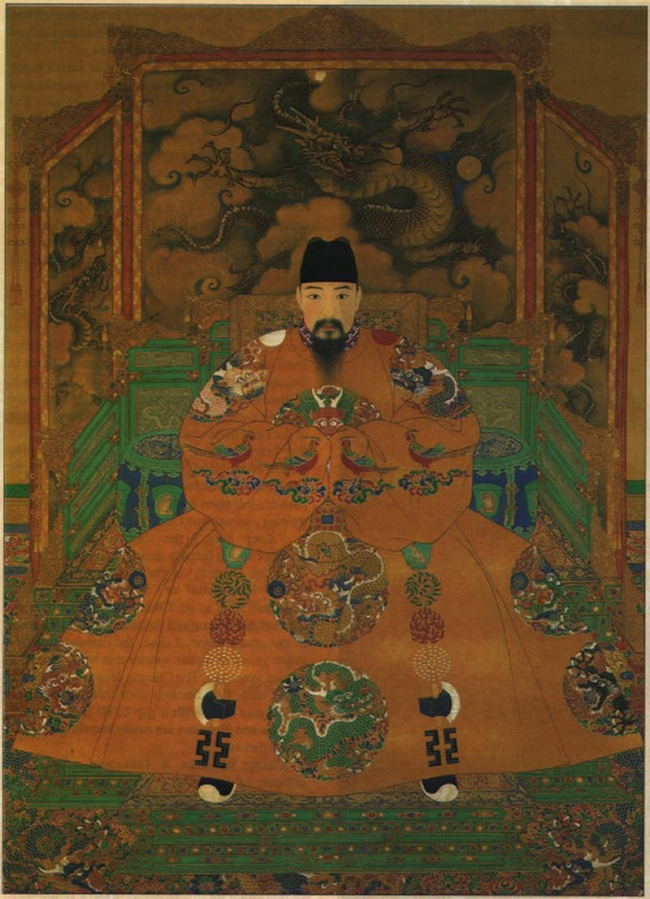
The Hongzhi Emperor (r. 1488–1505)

Choe found that people all across China, and in nearly every social strata, participated in business affairs. He wrote that even Chinese scholar officials—who were traditionally scorned if they took part in any private business venture— would "carry balances in their own sleeves and will analyze a profit for pennies".

While traveling from Shandong into North Zhili, Choe noticed a multitude of boats passing by which held officials from the Ministries of War, Justice, and Personnel. When he questioned his escorts about this, Choe was told that the newly enthroned Hongzhi Emperor (r. 1488–1505) had recently impeached a large number of officials from office whom he considered inept and unworthy of their positions. Brook writes that it was quite a comfortable privilege for disgraced and dismissed officials to be escorted by the courier service, yet even this saving of face was still a firm reminder of their banishment from court.

The party spent a total of 11 days traversing the North China Plain via the Grand Canal before reaching Tongzhou District, where there was a large warehouse depot adjunct to the capital city. From there they left their courier ships and traveled by donkey and foot towards the capital Beijing, where they lodged at the Central Courier Hostel. The Ming court granted the Korean party gifts of fine clothes during their stay. On 3 June, the officer in charge of Choe's escort notified the transport office in Beijing that three carriages plus horses and donkeys would be needed in the journey to the Korean border; when these were granted in the morning, the party swiftly departed from Beijing. Choe was not sad to leave the sights of Beijing behind, as he found the people there to be obsessed with business and cared little for agriculture or farming, a clear indication of his Confucian-oriented values.

=== Return to Korea ===
The party reached the capital of Liaodong on 2 July, left four days later on 6 July, and on 12 July Choe's party finally crossed the Yalu River and entered Joseon Korea. While the Grand Canal had its post stations, canal locks, ramps, moles, and paved towpaths, the land route from Beijing to the Yalu River was less elaborate but still featured the necessary distance markers and walled stations. Within a month of Choe's return to Korea, the Joseon court under King Seongjong (r. 1469–1494) sent an embassy to the Ming court of China in a gesture of thanks for the Ming court's cordial treatment of Choe and his crew and providing safe travel for them.

== Death ==
Choe became a victim of a political purge at court, was flogged in punishment by the rival faction who gained power and banished to Tanch'ŏn in the north in 1498 during the First Literati Purge of Yeonsangun's despotic reign (r. 1494–1506). Choe was ultimately executed in 1504 during the Second Literati Purge. However, he was exonerated after death and given posthumous honors by the Joseon court in 1506 with the demotion and exile of Yeonsangun and the raising of his half-brother Jungjong (r. 1506–1544) to the throne.

== Publication of Choe's diary ==
=== Pre-modern publications ===
The accounts of Choe Bu's travels in China became famous after King Seongjong requested that Choe submit a written account of his experiences to the throne. His diary account, the Geumnam pyohaerok (traditional Chinese: 錦南漂海錄; ; Korean: 금남표해록; lit. 'A Record of Drifting Across the Southern Brocade Sea'), written in literary Chinese (hanmun), was stored away in the Korean archives. Although it is uncertain whether it was printed right after it was written, it is known that Choe's grandson Yu Huichun (traditional Chinese: 柳希春; ; Korean: 유희춘) had it widely printed in Korea in 1569. A copy of the original print by Choe's grandson is now in the Yōmei Bunko of Kyoto. Choe's diary became famous even in Japan during the 16th century when it was reprinted several times. A copy of the 1573 Japanese edition is now in the Kanazawa Bunko of Yokohama. These were woodblock print copies, but an early movable type print edition was made and is located in the Tōyō Bunko of Tokyo. There was a Japanese publication in 1769 of Choe's diary accounts in a partial translation into Japanese by the Neo-Confucian scholar Seita Tansō (1721–1785). Several Edo period manuscript copies of Choe's travel diary are also in Japan. Other works written by Choe were compiled and published under the title Geumnamjip (錦南集 · 금남집) in Korea.

=== Modern utility ===
A complete translation of Choe's account into English was prepared by John Meskill as part of his Columbia University dissertation (1958). A slightly abbreviated version of Meskill's translation was published as a book in 1965 by the University of Arizona Press, for the Association for Asian Studies.

Choe wrote in the usual tone of a learned Confucian scholar, which provides insight into the values and attitudes of early Joseon Confucian scholars. Choe Bu's account is unique among foreign travel accounts in China, since it is from the perspective of a castaway, not a commonplace Korean ambassador to Ming China. Historian Eugene Newton Anderson notes that, while pre-modern Koreans tended to adulate China and associate it with everything that was positive, Choe regarded it with a more objective outsider's perspective. When curious Chinese pressed Choe about Korea's rituals of ancestor worship, Choe responded, "All my countrymen build shrines and sacrifice to their ancestors. They serve the gods and spirits they ought to serve and do not respect unorthodox sacrifices." Historian Laurel Kendall writes that this was perhaps wishful thinking, but it reveals what a 15th-century Korean Confucian thought the Chinese would consider proper and in accordance with the teaching of Confucius. When a certain Chinese scholar Wang Yiyuan sympathized with Choe and his party's plight and served him tea, he asked Choe if the Koreans revered the Buddha as the Chinese did. Choe answered, "my country does not revere the Buddhist law, it honors only the Confucian system. All its families make filial piety, fraternal duty, loyalty, and sincerity their concern."

Although Choe did not adulate China to the extent of his peers and viewed it as an outsider, he did express in his writing a close affinity towards the Chinese, noting that Korea and China's cultures were hardly distinguishable from one another in terms of parallel values. For example, Choe wrote of a conversation he had with a Chinese officer who had shown him a great deal of hospitality during his travels, saying to him:

Certainly that shows your feelings that though my Korea is beyond the sea, its clothing and culture being the same as China's, it cannot be considered a foreign country ... All under Heaven are my brothers; how can we discriminate among people because of distance? That is particularly true of my country, which respectful serves the Celestial Court and pays tribute without fail. The Emperor, for his part, treats us punctiliously and tends us benevolently. The feeling of security he imparts is perfect.

However, through the written dialogue in his diary, Choe did express slight differences between the cultures of China and Korea. For example, when the Chinese asked him whether or not the Korean education system offered degrees for specialists who dealt with only one of the Five Classics, Choe wrote that a Korean student who only studied one of the Classics and not all five of them was doomed to failing his exam and never attaining the rank of a full-fledged Confucian scholar.

Choe's comments are valuable to historians seeking to better understand Chinese culture and civilization in the 15th century; for example, historians' seeking for clues about how widespread literacy was in China, Choe's comment "even village children, ferrymen, and sailors" were able to read serves as a valuable piece of evidence. Moreover, Choe asserted that they could describe for him the mountains, rivers, old ruins, and other places in their regions, along with the significance of dynastic changes. Choe also bothered to list items such as the generous provisions provided by regional commanders, which included in one instance a plate of pork, two ducks, four chickens, two fish, one beaker of wine, one plate of rice, one plate of walnuts, one plate of vegetables, one plate of bamboo shoots, one plate of wheat noodles, one plate of jujube fruit, and one plate of bean curd. Although he was offered wine in China, Choe asserts in his diary that he rejected the offer due to the continuing three-year mourning period for his late father. In addition to wine, he stated that he also abstained from eating "meat, garlic, oniony plants, or sweet things". This strict adherence to Confucian principles by a Korean pleased his Chinese hosts.

Choe also made observations about China's topography in each of the towns and villages he visited. His documenting of exact locations can aid historians in pinpointing old and lost places and structures. In his description of Suzhou, he wrote:

In olden times, Suzhou was called Wukuai. It borders the sea in the east, commands three large rivers and five lakes, and has a thousand li of rich fields … Le Bridge is inside the wall and separates Wu and Changzhou counties. Market quarters are scattered like stars. Many rivers and lakes flow through [the region], refreshing and purifying it.

=== Similar publications ===
A similar episode to Choe Bu's shipwrecked travels in China occurred in 1644, when three Japanese ships headed for Hokkaidō became lost in a violent storm at sea. The 15 survivors led by Takeuchi Tōuemon (竹内藤右衛門) – those who were not murdered when they came to shore – drifted into a port in what is now Primorsky Krai, but what was then controlled by the newly established Qing dynasty of China. They were taken to the Manchu capital of Shenyang, and then escorted to the newly conquered city of Beijing. The Manchu prince Dorgon (1612–1650) treated these shipwrecked Japanese with respect, pitied them for their misfortune, and provided them with provisions and ships to return to Japan. When they returned to Japan, they were interrogated by Tokugawa authorities, and submitted a report to Tokugawa Iemitsu (r. 1623–1651) on their experiences in China. Just like in the case of Choe Bu, this account was published as the Dattan hyōryūki ("Account of drifting into the [Land of the] Tartars", Japanese: 韃靼漂流記) and as the Ikoku monogatari ("Stories from a Foreign Land", Japanese: 異国物語).

== See also ==
- Travel literature
- Ghiyāth al-dīn Naqqāsh, author of an account of a Central Asian embassy to China, ca. 1420
- Tomé Pires, a Portuguese envoy, whose imprisoned companions wrote some of the earliest European accounts about the interior of China (ca. 1524)
- Sin Sukchu (1417–1475), a Korean scholar who authored one of the first descriptions of the Chinese phonetics as viewed from a foreign language's point of view
