= Kim Much'e =

Goryeo scholar-official (fl. 11th century)

- Hangul: 김무체
- Hanja: 金無滯
- RR: Gim Muche
- MR: Kim Much'e

Kim Much'e (fl. 11th century) was a scholar and educator of the Goryeo period, and founder of one of the Twelve Assemblies of Goryeo. He passed the literary examination in 1035, and rose to a position of rank. Under the reign of Munjong, Kim opened a private academy called Seowondo (西園徒, or "Western Garden Assembly"), which became one of the leading educational institutions of the kingdom. This and the other Twelve Assemblies came to be preferred over the national academy (the Gukjagam).

== See also ==
- List of Goryeo people
