= Republic of Korea public service examinations =

The Republic of Korea public service examinations are examinations held to screen applicants to the South Korean Civil Service, South Korean Foreign Service and South Korean Legal Service. The examinations are open to all Republic of Korea citizens, and the applicant need not be the holder of a degree or have any other experience; passing the exams are in themselves sufficient for recruitment; however the exams are notoriously difficult.

== Background ==
Korea has a long history of selecting by public examination, in pre-Republic times by the Gwageo examinations, to choose those most able to fill the ranks of public office.

The Korean civil service exams are used to select applicants for the Korean Civil Service at the ninth (new entry) rank. Following recruitment, promotion is based primarily on seniority, except for a number of direct entry recruitments at the seventh and fifth rank, through the passing of the seventh and fifth rank examinations (고등고시). For those passing the exam and entering the service at the fifth rank, this is equivalent to 25 years of seniority working from the entry level upward.

Similar exams existed for the legal profession, called the bar examination (the Korean system differed significantly from those in other jurisdictions in that passing the exam was in itself was sufficient to enter the profession and one need not have attended a law school and received a law degree) and for the Korean foreign service.

The civil service exam for fifth grade civil servants is divided into three sections. The first test includes language logic, data analysis, situational judgment, Constitution, Korean history, and English. Language logic, data analysis, and decision-making are called PSAT (Public Service Aptitude Test) and each has 40 questions. The constitution is 20 questions. English and Korean history are replaced by certificates. The second test includes economics, administrative law, administration, politics, and information system theory. The second exam is held for a total of 5 days with one subject per day. It takes about 10 pages of test paper for two hours that day. The third test is an interview.

The 7th grade civil service exam is divided into two sections. In the first test, there are seven subjects: Korean, Korean history, English, Constitution, Administrative Law, Public Administration and Economics. There are 20 questions each. The second test is an interview.

The 9th grade civil service exam is divided into two sections. There are five subjects in the first test: Korean language, Korean history, English language, Public Administration, and Administrative Law. There are 20 questions each. The second test is an interview.
