= Education in Joseon =

Education in the Joseon dynasty of Korea was largely aimed at preparing students for government service. The ultimate goal of most students was successful passage of the state examinations, known as gwageo.

Educational institutions were extremely widespread in the country, and can be divided into public and private. The highest public institution was the Seonggyungwan, located in Seoul. Below this were the Sahak (사부학당), four schools providing technical training, and the hyanggyo, schools supported by each of the Eight Provinces. The hyanggyo soon fell into neglect, and for most of the Joseon period education was dominated by two types of private schools, seowon (preparatory schools mostly for the aristocracy) and seodang (private village schools providing elementary education).

== Civil service examinations ==
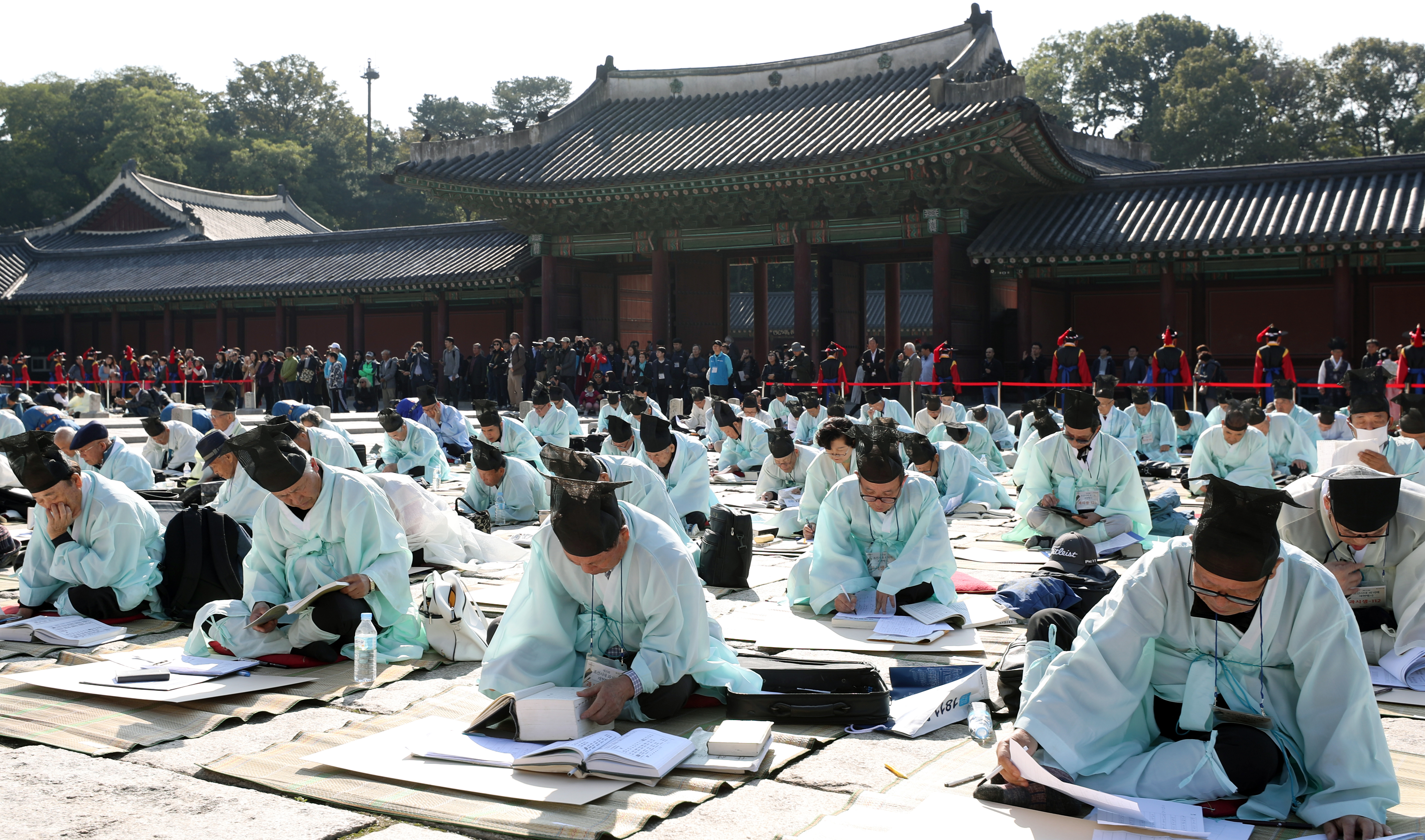
Gwageo

The civil service examinations, known as gwageo, assessed a student's ability to interpret the Chinese classics, in terms of official Neo-Confucian ideology. The gwageo were divided into civil and military sections. The gwageo system had been set up in the Goryeo dynasty, but reached its peak in the Joseon period.

Noble status during the Joseon Dynasty was decided by education level; generally, passing court exams led to an easier path into upper class status. The upper class, referred to as yangban, was split into two groups: munban or mungwa, who were civilian officers and military officials.

Different types of exams existed based on official court positions; two preliminary civil service exams, sogwa, were followed by one higher civil service exam, daegwa. When combined, the three exams were known as mungwa. The sogwa consisted of two smaller exams, known as the saengwon-si, which examined Confucian classics, and the jinsa-si, which contained essay writing.

The military exam, mugwa, included military training and required proficiency in the Confucian classics, otherwise known as the Four Books and Three Classics, and knowledge in legislative theory.

The first mungwa exams were held in 1399, and from 1402 to 1894, 801 mugwa testing sessions were held. Approximately 15,150 people passed the mungwa, a higher form of civil service examination, daegwa, between 1392 and 1897.

== Medical licensing examinations ==
Medical examinations, known as uigwa, were not a requirement for doctors treating civilians; the only requirement was an apprenticeship, after which civilian physicians were able to begin their medical work. Royal physicians and officers had to complete an examination, after which they gained their license. Such exams had to be passed before physicians could accept responsibility for the king’s health.

The examinations for medical licensing occurred until 1894, when the civil service examination agency was abolished. Up until then, all social status systems, the number of candidates, procedures, methods of testing, and agency were stringently enforced and maintained.

== State-supported education ==
=== Seonggyungwan ===
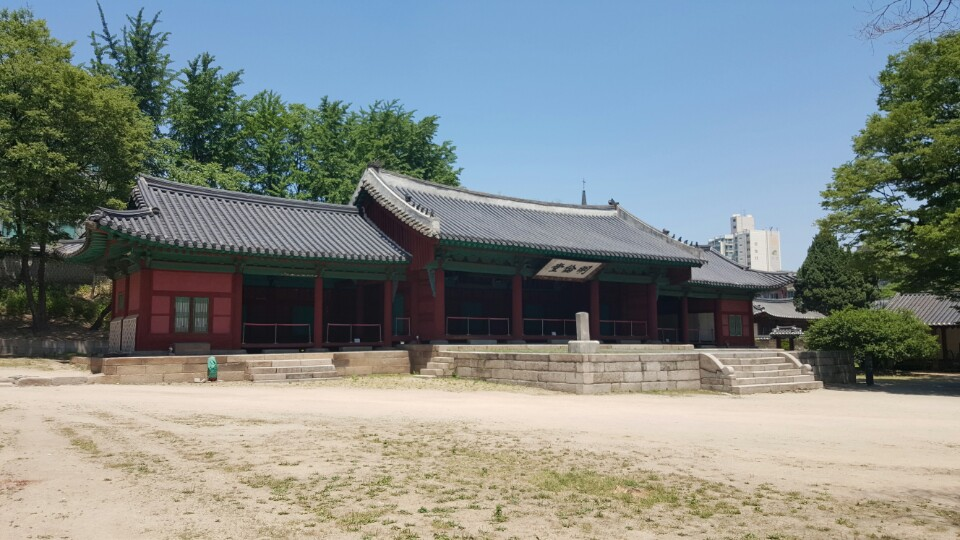
Sungkyunkwan

The Seonggyungwan was the highest educational institution in Joseon, and attracted scholars from across the country. It was based on the Goryeo-period Gukjagam.

== Confucian curriculum ==
The Korean Confucian curriculum was based on the Chinese educational system which had 15 or so primary works, and a large number of exegetical works, along with graded exams that were on set topics. All of these works were written in Chinese, the academic written language of Joseon. A common introductory textbook was the Lesser Learning, an exegetical work by Zhu Xi.

== Sonbi ==
Among the forefront of the different social classes were the Sonbi, known as the gentleman-scholar, who were remembered for their devotion to Neo-Confucian studies. Typically, their social standing was upper-class. Commonly, they disciplined themselves in Confucian teachings, with the aim of improving their learning and character which would eventually render them capable of governing the general populace. Generally, the Sonbi aimed to become scholar-officials.

Education for the Sonbi began with the teaching of the lessons outlined by Seohak, specifically The Learning of the Young. Seohak was utilized as a moral training for young children and emphasized basic principles of principles of conduct, such as cleanliness and how to conduct oneself. Although moral training was conducted in all social classes, Sonbi, who were an upper-class, had their moral training emphasized.

== Footnotes ==
1. Nahm (1996), p. 110.
2. Hong & Paik (2018)
3. Jung (1998)

== See also ==
- History of Korea
- Education in North Korea
- Education in South Korea
