= Seodang =

Private village schools in Korea

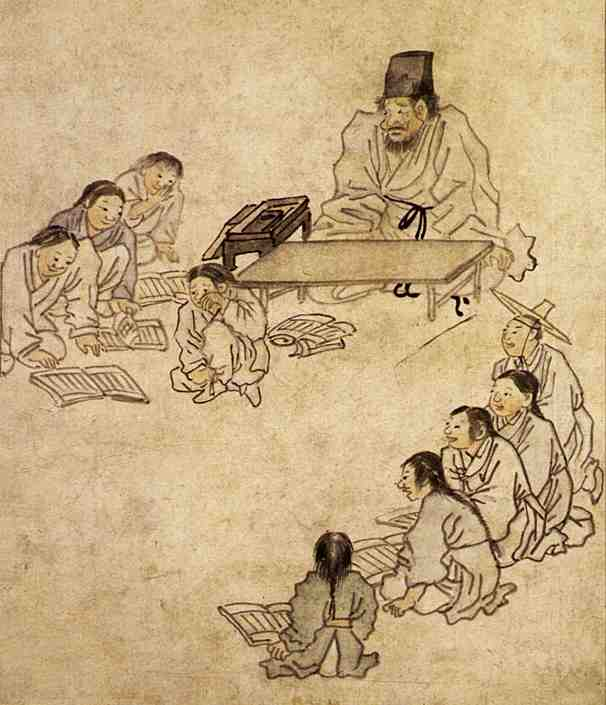
- The picture titled "Seodang" drawn by Gim Hongdo in the late 18th century.

Korean name
- Hangul: 서당
- Hanja: 書堂
- RR: seodang
- MR: sŏdang

Seodang (Korean: 서당) were private village schools providing elementary education during the Goryeo and Joseon dynasties of Korea.

== Background ==
They were primarily occupied with providing initial training in the Chinese classics to boys of 7 to 16 years of age, but often served students into their twenties. Not regulated in any fashion, seodang could be freely opened and closed by anyone who wished to. Widespread during the Goryeo period, these flourished during Joseon times and were the dynasty's most common educational institution. It has been estimated that 16,000 existed at the end of the Joseon period.

The teacher or headmaster of the seodang was called the hunjang. The seodang were divided into various kinds depending on the hunjang's motivation and relation to the community:

- Hunjang jayeong seodang (훈장자영서당; 訓長自營書堂): Seodang established by the hunjang, as a hobby or to make a living.
- Yuji dogyeong seodang (유지독영서당; 有志獨營書堂): Seodang established by a wealthy member of the community, who hires the hunjang.
- Yuji johap seodang (유지조합서당; 有志組合書堂): Seodang established by an organization of wealthy locals.
- Chonjohap seodang (촌조합서당; 村組合書堂): Seodang established by an entire village together.

The course of study typically began with the Thousand Character Classic, and proceeded to independent reading of the Three Books and Five Classics. The teaching method emphasized rote learning by reading and memorizing an assigned passage each day; after reading the passage more than 100 times over, students would recite it to the hunjang.

== Historical change ==
The nature of the seodang changed in the course of the Joseon period. While early in the dynasty they were purely private academies, they increasingly became village institutions. New social institutions such as the gye cooperatives, which emerged in the 19th century, often centered on the village seodang, as did the older hyangyak village codes.

In the 20th century, many seodang were modernized and known as "improved seodang" (개량 서당), and eventually accredited as primary schools during Colonial Korea. This was part of a dramatic expansion of private education in this period; from 1883 to 1908, some 5,000 private schools were established in Korea. Beginning in 1918, regulations on private education became much more stringent and repressive; the number of seodang dropped sharply. Many of the seodang that did survive became low-level technical academies, or ganihakgyo (간이학교).

Today, seodang still operate as private academies under the name of Seodang. Their purpose is to teach Chinese character skills from beginner to intermediate and advanced levels.

== See also ==
- Education in the Joseon Dynasty
- Korean Confucianism
- Joseon Dynasty
