= Sŏnggyun'gwan =

Leading academy in pre-modern Korea

Coordinates: 37°35′08″N 126°59′45″E

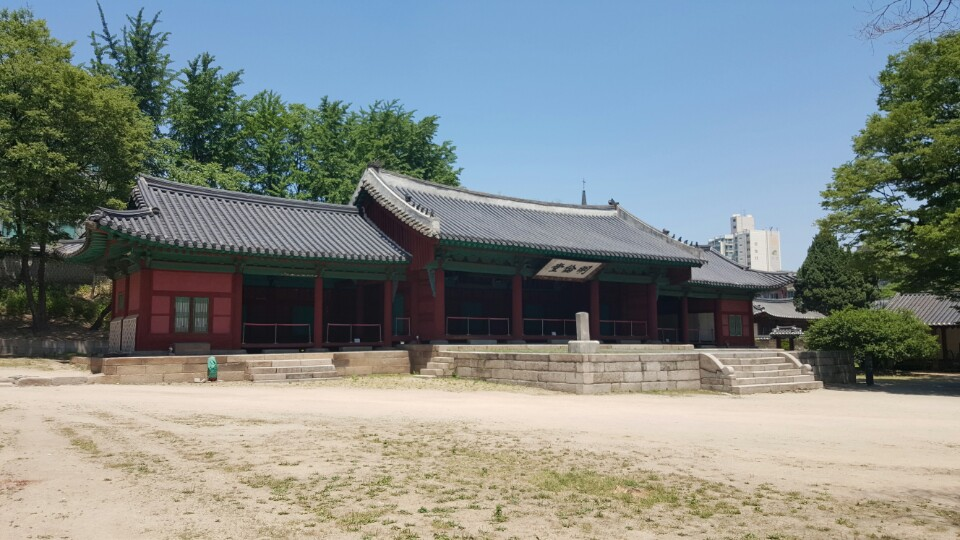
- Myeongnyundang Lecture Hall of Sŏnggyun'gwan
- Interactive map of Sŏnggyun'gwan
- Location: Sungkyunkwan University, Seoul, South Korea

Historic Sites of South Korea
- Designated: 1964-11-10
- Part of: Munmyo Confucian Shrine and Seonggyungwan National Academy, Seoul
- Reference no.: 143

Korean name
- Hangul: 성균관
- Hanja: 成均館
- RR: Seonggyungwan
- MR: Sŏnggyun'gwan

Sŏnggyun'gwan (Korean: 성균관; Hanja: 成均館) was the foremost educational institution in Korea during the late Goryeo and Joseon Dynasties. The Sŏnggyun'gwan during the Joseon Dynasty sits in its original location, at the south end of the Humanities and Social Sciences Campus of Sungkyunkwan University in Seoul, South Korea. The Sŏnggyun'gwan during the Goryeo Dynasty, however, remains situated in Kaesong, North Korea. At the South Korean Sungkyunkwan, twice a year, in May and September, the ceremonial rite Seokjeon Daeje is performed in the Munmyo Shrine, to honour Confucius and the Confucian sages of China and Korea.

== Etymology ==
- sŏng (Korean: 성; Hanja: 成): accomplish, achieve. To become capable, successful or to win. “To perfect or develop human nature”.
- gyun (균; 均): balance, to be. Strengthen culture according to social standards or norms. “To build a good society”.
- gwan (관; 館): institute, academy, university.

== History ==
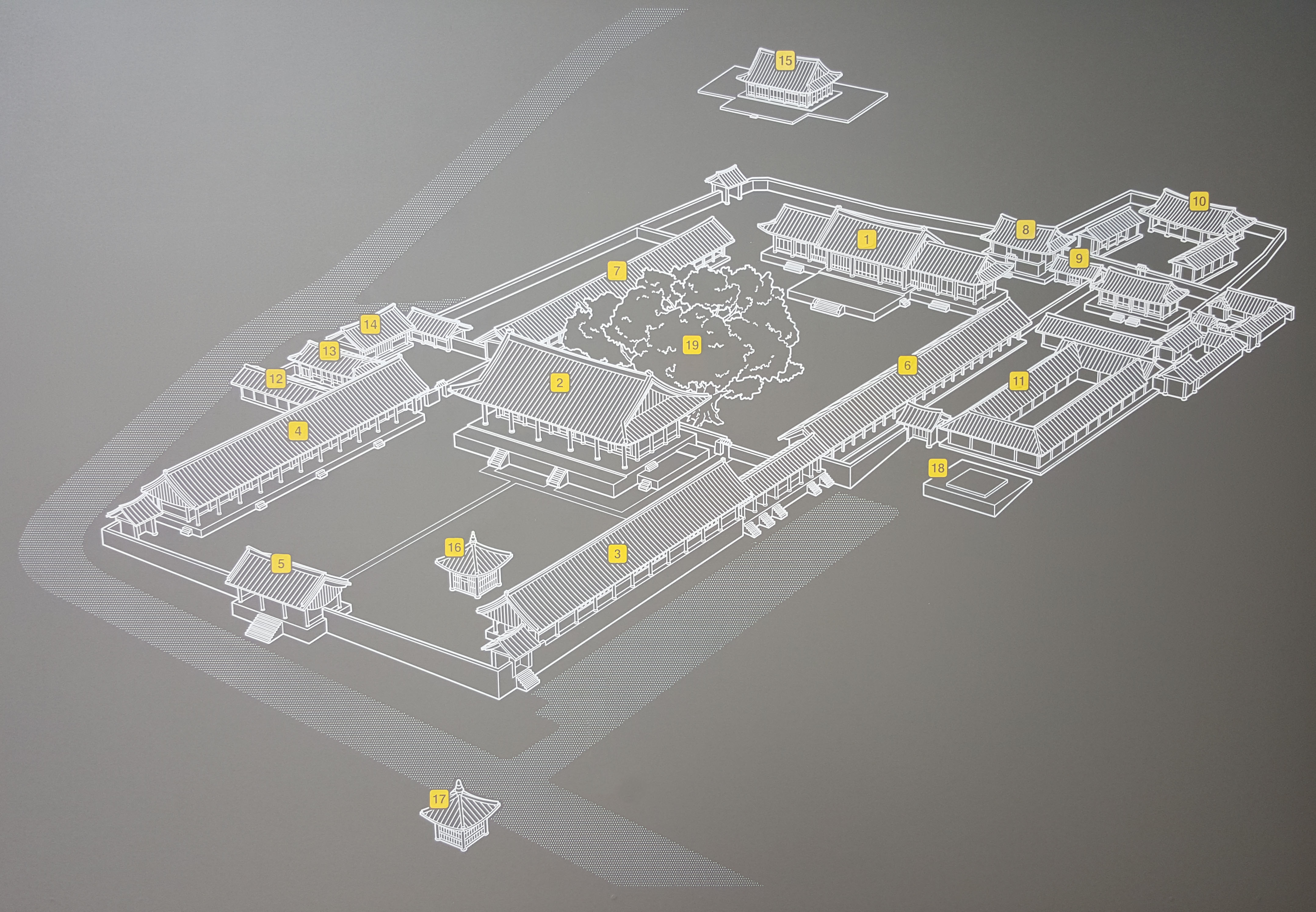
Sŏnggyun'gwan Old Campus Layout

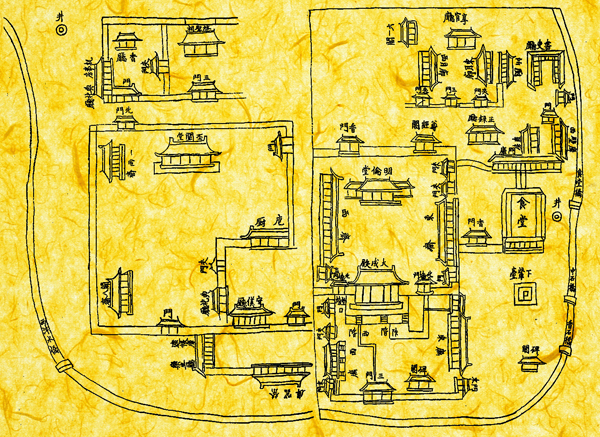
1785 Map of Sŏnggyun'gwan

Sŏnggyun'gwan was established in Hanyang on September 25, 1398. It was renamed, destroyed, and rebuilt several times. In 1895, it was reformed into a modern three-year university. During the colonial era (between 1910 and 1945), Sŏnggyun'gwan was demoted to a private institution and renamed Gyeonghagwon (경학원; 經學院), while Korean education was prohibited and Japanese education was forced nationwide. After Korea gained independence in 1945, Gyeonghagwon's original name was restored and with funding from Yurim (Confucians) nationwide, Sungkyunkwan University was established.

== Design features ==
The old campus was designed based on geomancy. Sŏnggyun'gwan was built with the mountains behind it to the north and the front facing south towards water (the Han River and Bansu, the creek that used to run around the front of the campus). This was based on superstition as well as function. The sunlight and wind patterns were considered most ideal when the buildings were arranged this way.

== Education ==
The primary written language of Sŏnggyun'gwan was Hanmun. Sŏnggyun'gwan's teachings were mainly Confucian-related, and were primarily aimed at preparing students for government service. Students also studied law, medicine, interpretation, accounting, archery, mathematics, music, and etiquette. But the main goal was for the students to pass the higher national civil service examinations (gwageo). Like their Chinese counterpart, these examinations were on writing ability, knowledge of the Confucian classics, and proposals of management of the state (governance). Technical subjects were also included to appoint experts in medicine, interpretation, accounting, and law. The original set number of students was 150 when Sŏnggyun'gwan was founded, which was raised to 200 in 1429. All of the students were male and women were forbidden from entering the campus.

Entrance examinations for Sŏnggyun'gwan were extremely harsh and were only allowed for the sons of yangban, the Joseon era upper class or royalty. There were two ways to be accepted into Sŏnggyun'gwan. Either the students had to pass the two admission exams, Saengwonsi (생원시; 生員試) and Jinsasi (진사시; 進士試), or take the other two examinations, Seungbo (승보) and Eumseo. If they passed these examinations, they were given the opportunity to be accepted.

Students lived very comfortably on full scholarship and were waited on by servants.

== Images ==
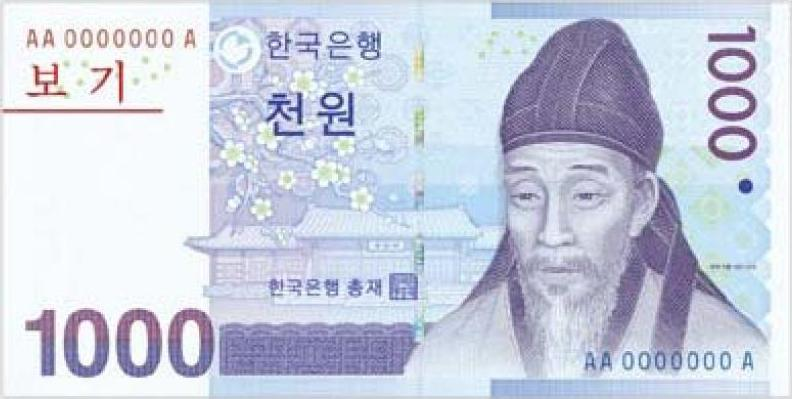
The 1000 KRW banknote shows Confucian scholar Yi Hwang and Myeongnyundang.

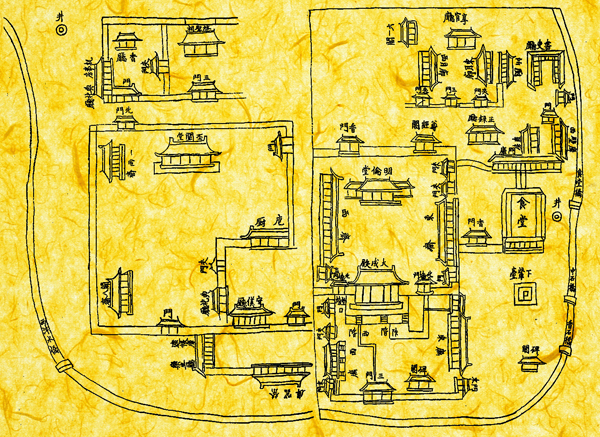
This map from 1785 shows the original campus of Sŏnggyun'gwan. Most of the buildings to the west are gone.

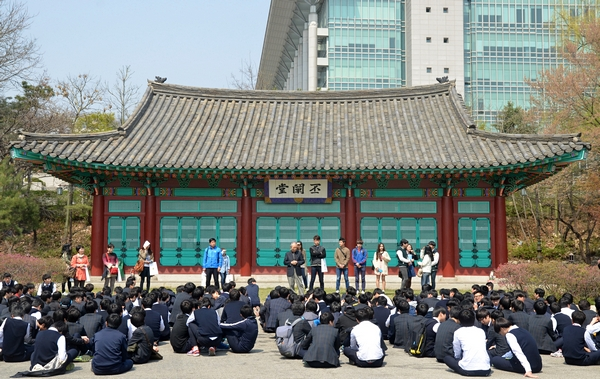
Bicheondang

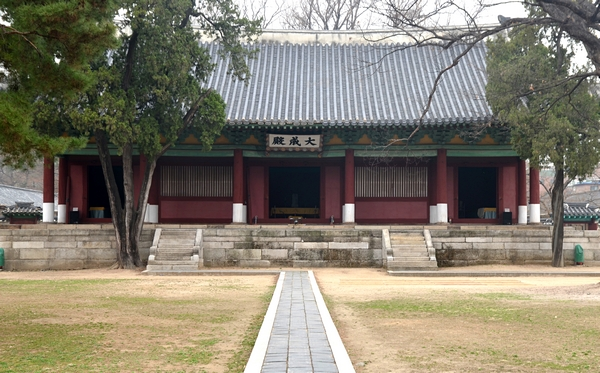
Daeseongjeon, with the doors open.

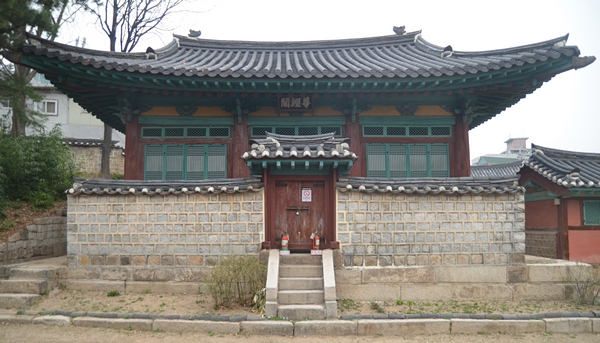
Jongyeonggak, Korea's oldest library.

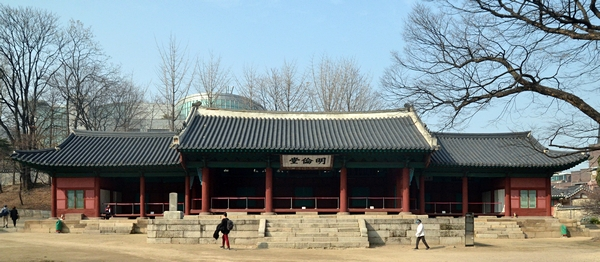
The lecture hall of Sŏnggyun'gwan.

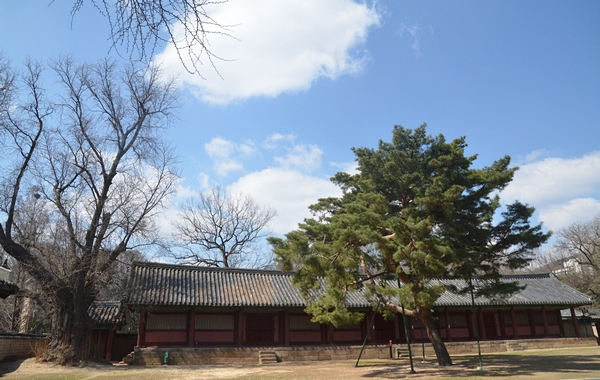
This building enshrines tablets to the great Confucian scholars.

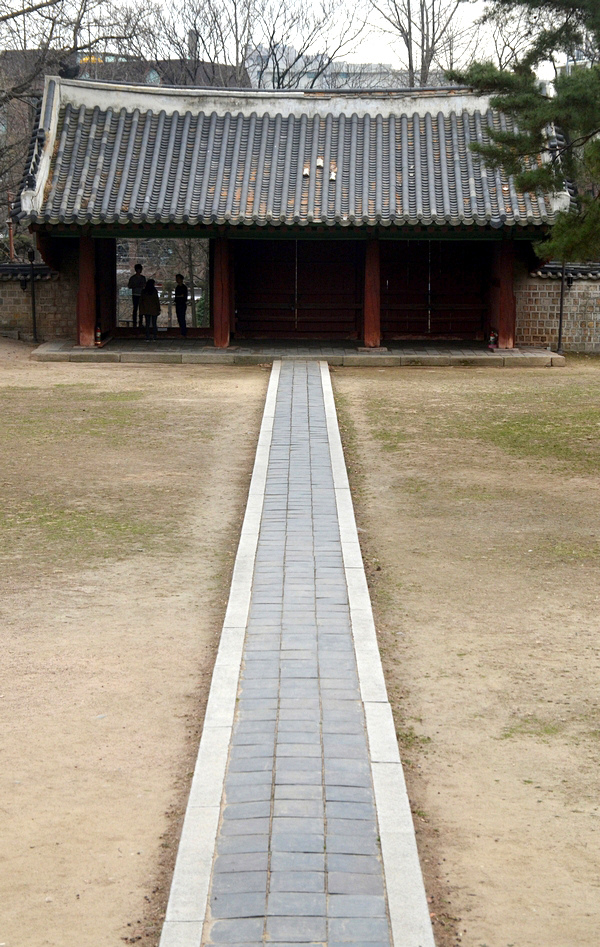
Sinsammun opened its doors for APAIE delegates on 17 March 2014.

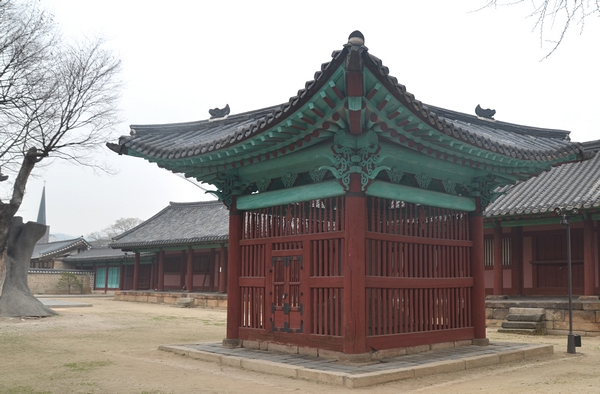
Tangpyeongbigak

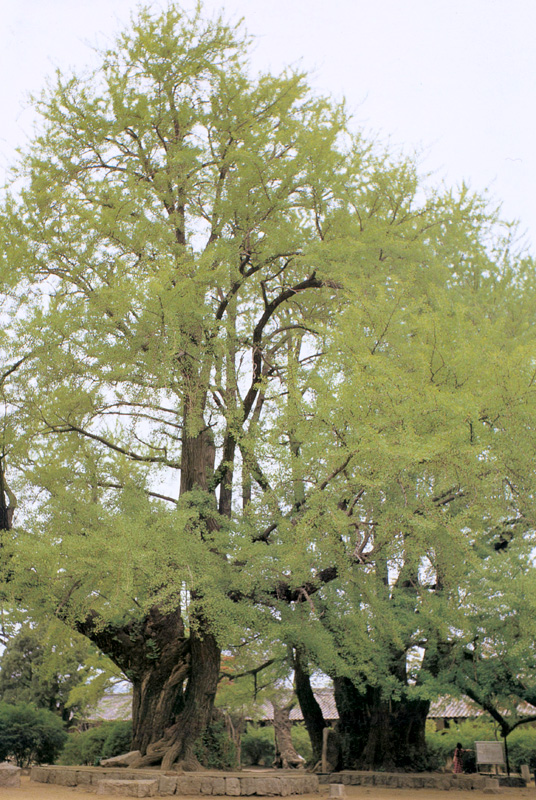
Ginkgo tree natural monument 59 possibly planted 1398

== Notable alumni ==
- Yi Kae (1417–1456)
- Hwang Hŭi (1363–1452)
- Chŏng Inji (1396–1478)
- Ch'oe Hang (1409–1474)
- Munjong of Joseon (1414–1452)
- Sin Sukchu (1417–1475)
- Sejo of Joseon (1414–1468)
- Kim Chong-jik (1431–1492)
- Cho Kwangjo (1482–1519)
- Yi Hwang (1501–1570)
- Hyujeong (1520–1604)
- Yi I (1536–1584)
- Yu Sŏngnyong (1542–1607)
- Kim Jang-saeng (1548–1631)
- Yun Sŏndo (1587–1671)
- Hŏ Mok (1587–1682)
- Yun Hyu (1617–1680)
- Gwon Sang-ha (1641–1721)
- Park Mun-su (1691–1756)
- Yeongjo of Joseon (1694–1776)
- Jeongjo of Joseon (1752–1800)
- Chŏng Yagyong (1762–1836)
- Pak Kyusu (1807–1877)
- Choe Ik-hyeon (1833–1906)
- Kim Ok-gyun (1851–1894)
- Park Eun-sik (1859–1925)
- Yi Tongnyŏng (1869–1940)
- Shin Chae-ho (1880–1936)
- Jo So-ang (1887–1959)

== See also ==
- Education in the Joseon Dynasty
- History of Education
- Gukhak
- Gukjagam
- Songgyungwan (Kaesong)
- Sungkyunkwan University
- Beijing Guozijian
