= Gwageo =

Civil service exams in pre-1910 Korea

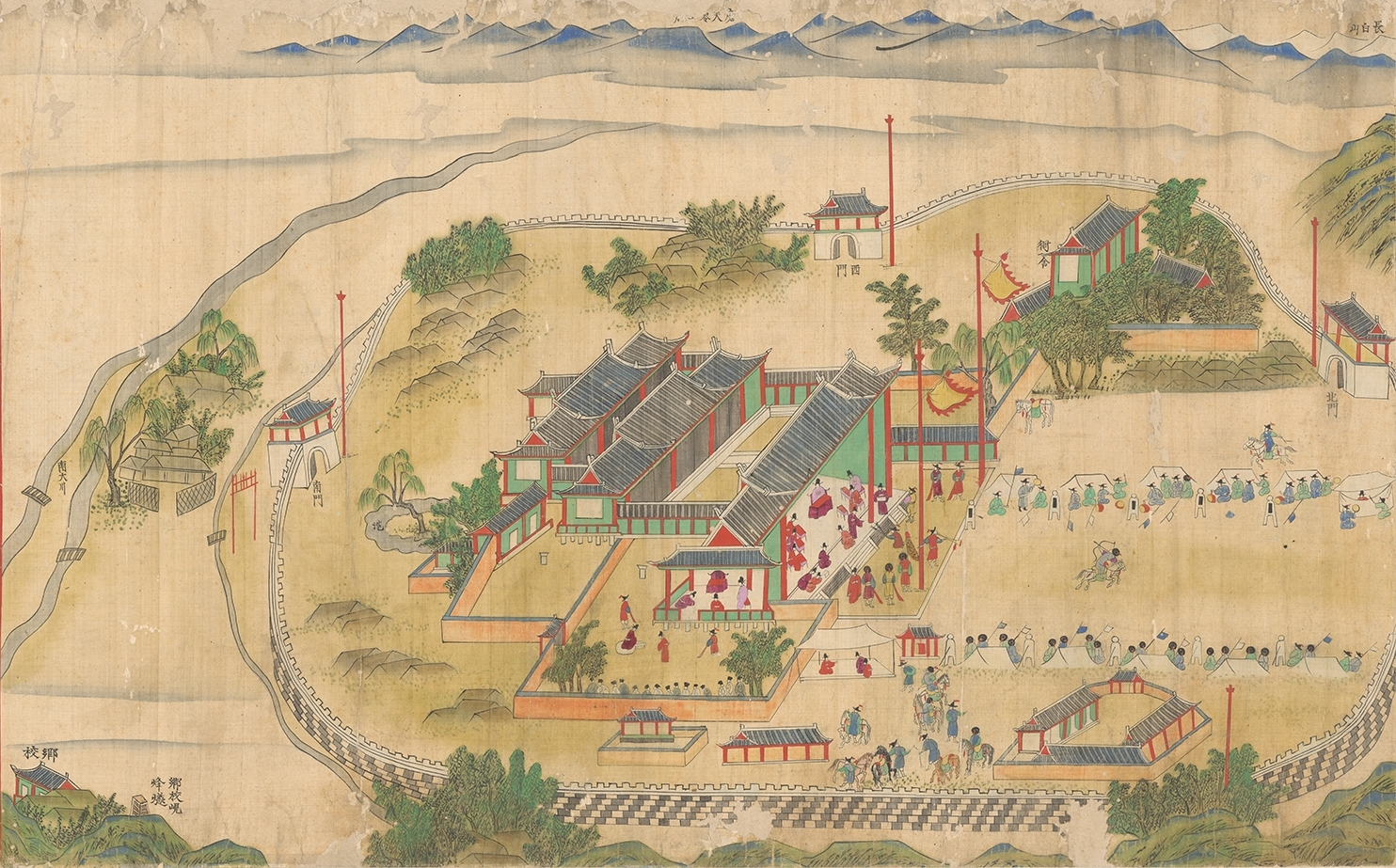
- Painting of the gwageo being administered in Hamhung during the Joseon period

Korean name
- Hangul: 과거
- Hanja: 科擧
- RR: gwageo
- MR: kwagŏ

The gwageo (Korean: 과거; Hanja: 科擧) or kwagŏ were the national civil service examinations under the Goryeo (918–1392) and Joseon (1392–1910) periods of Korea. These typically demanding tests measured candidates' ability of writing composition and knowledge of the Chinese classics. The form of writing varied from literature to proposals on management of the state. Technical subjects were also tested to appoint experts on medicine, interpretation, accounting, law etc. These were the primary route for most people to achieve positions in the bureaucracy.

Based on the civil service examinations of imperial China, the gwageo first arose in Unified Silla, gained importance in Goryeo, and were the centerpiece of most education in the Joseon dynasty. The tutelage provided at the hyanggyo, seowon, and Sungkyunkwan was aimed primarily at preparing students for the gwageo and their subsequent career in government service. Under Joseon law, high office was closed to those who were not children of officials of the second full rank or higher, unless the candidate had passed the gwageo. Those who passed the higher literary examination came to monopolize all of the dynasty's high positions of state.

== Overview ==
Korea started implementing examinations for the selection of administrative posts during the Silla period (57 BCE – 935 CE) and some Sillans even took the imperial exam in the Tang dynasty, receiving degrees after passing it. In 788, under the influence of Confucian scholar Ch'oe Ch'i-wŏn, Silla implemented an exam system that allowed lower nobility to take exams without attending the Gukhak, which was a national education institution exclusive to the aristocracy.

During the Goryeo period (918–1392), a Chinese style civil service examination system was imported from China through the Hanlin scholar Shuang Ji, who visited Goryeo in 958. Shuang Ji was invited by Gwangjong of Goryeo to stay at his court permanently and set up the civil examination system. According to a Song dynasty writer named Xu Jing, the Korean examination recruitment system was largely the same as the Chinese one with some differences. Unlike in China, the examination papers were written in both the Idu script and Classical Chinese. The exam takers did not sit in separate cells like in China, but rather sat on the ground in the open under sunshades.

By the end of the Goryeo period, a military exam had been added, the triennial schedule observed, and the exam hierarchy organized into provincial, metropolitan, and palace levels, similar to the Chinese. Other practices, such as the inclusion of exams on Buddhism and the worship of Confucius, were particular to Korea and not shared with China. Outside China, the examination system was most widely implemented in Korea, with enrollment rates surpassing even that of China. In theory, any free man (not Nobi) was able to take the examinations, but in practice the yangban aristocratic class eventually monopolized the system. At the start of the Joseon period, 33 candidates were selected from every triennial examination, and the number increased to 50 later on. In comparison, China's selected candidates after each palace examination were no more than 40 to 300 from the Tang to Ming dynasties while encompassing a landmass six times larger than Korea. By the Joseon period, high offices were closed to aristocrats who had not passed the exams. Over the span of 600 years, the Joseon civil service selected more than 14,606 candidates in the highest level examinations on 744 occasions. The examination system continued until 1894 when it was abolished by the Gabo Reform.

== Pre-Joseon ==
=== Silla ===
In the 7th century, the Gukhak (National University) of Silla (57 BCE – 935 CE) taught its students the Confucian Classics and assigned its graduates into three categories based on their knowledge of Confucian literature. The graduates were all invariably members of the aristocracy and were appointed to administrative posts.

The first national examinations were administered in the kingdom of Silla beginning in 788 after the Confucian scholar Ch'oe Ch'i-wŏn submitted the Ten Urgent Points of Reform to Queen Jinseong, the ruler of Silla at the time. The exam system, known as Sambun-gwa, allowed lower nobility to take the exams without attending the Gukhak (also called Daehakgam for a time). However the exams were still only available to aristocrats.

In the 9th century, Koreans directly participated in the Chinese imperial examination system and as many as 88 Sillans received degrees after passing the Tang examinations.

=== Goryeo ===
In 958, an envoy from the Hanlin Academy of Later Zhou named Shuang Ji visited Kaesong and advised Gwangjong of Goryeo to establish a Chinese style civil service examination system. Gwangjong was highly pleased with Shuang Ji and requested that he remain at the Korean court permanently. The examination system expanded the bureaucracy and opened it to a wider demographic, breaking the hold of a few powerful families over the government. Throughout the dynasty, they retained this character of strengthening the throne against the aristocracy. This also took the form of aligning the throne with the provincial elites, and the kings of Goryeo strove to extend educational opportunities to the local elites throughout the country. Any member of the yangmin (commoner) freeborn class was permitted to take the examination, although the descendants of monks, criminals and cheonmin were excluded.

The major examinations were literary, and came in two forms: a composition test (chinsa or jesul eop), and a test of classical knowledge (myeonggyeong eop). The composition test, which tested Chinese literary forms, came to be viewed as more prestigious, and its successful applicants were divided into three grades. On the other hand, successful candidates of the classical examination, which tested for knowledge on the Confucian Classics, were not ranked. In the course of the dynasty, some 6000 men passed the composition examination, while only about 450 passed the classics examination. These tests were supposed to be held on a triennial basis, but in practice it was common for them to be held at other times as well.

The classics examination was revised in 1344, under the reign of Chunghye, on the model of the examination system then employed in the Yuan dynasty. The Yuan examination hierarchy of local, provincial, and metropolitan exams were instituted in 1369 by Yi Saek. The former examination system based on the traditional classics was replaced with one based on Neo-Confucian interpretations of the classics. By 1390 there was a military exam. The national examinations became more systematic and powerful under Goryeo than they had been under Silla. However, they remained only one among several avenues to power. A man who had reached a position of the fifth rank or higher could automatically have one son placed in a position of rank. Over time government-run educational institutions such as the hyanggyo (provincial schools) and Gukjagam (National University) lost ground to private institutions like the Twelve Assemblies.

There were other miscellaneous examinations (jabeop) that were administered in various fields. One among them was Buddhism; monks who passed received a special clerical title, beginning with daeseon, or "monk designate." The Buddhist examinations were ended in the 15th century as part of a Buddhism suppression campaign. Another examination was the chapkwa, which tested fields such as law, mathematics, medicine, p'ungsu (Fengshui), and divination. The chapkwa examination was mainly taken by the jungin upper middle class.

== Joseon ==
Under the Joseon Dynasty (1392–1910), the examinations fell under three broad categories: the literary examinations (문과; 文科; mun'gwa), military examinations (무과; 武科; mugwa), and miscellaneous examinations (잡과; 雜科; chapkwa) covering topics such as medicine, geography, astronomy, and translation. As other roads to advancement were much more closed than during the Goryeo period, the gwageo became virtually the only pathway to a position of rank.

In theory, anyone other than nobi could take gwageo examinations, but in reality only yangban who had the luxury of spending much of their childhood and early adulthood studying could hope to pass the exam. In the case of literary administration, children of remarried women, concubines, and officials who were dismissed for corruption were excluded from taking the exam. Gwageo examinations were very important not only for an individual but for his family because a yangban family that did not produce a government official for four generations lost their status as yangban.

When writing the examination, candidates had to record the names and positions of their four great-grandfathers. The higher literary examination was restricted to those who either were already in a position of rank, or who had already passed the lower examination. The miscellaneous examinations were looked down upon by the yangban, and were generally restricted to the chungin class of hereditary technical workers. Criteria for the military examination varied, but over time it became open even to members of the lowest class (the cheonmin).

The gwageo provided a basis for various forms of regionalism. Due to the strength of regional factions in Joseon Dynasty politics, scholars from out-of-favor factions often did not bother to take the examination at all. In the late Joseon Dynasty, an increasing percentage of successful candidates came from the northern province of Pyongan, and the small county of Chŏngju came to produce more successful candidates than any other county.

=== Administration ===
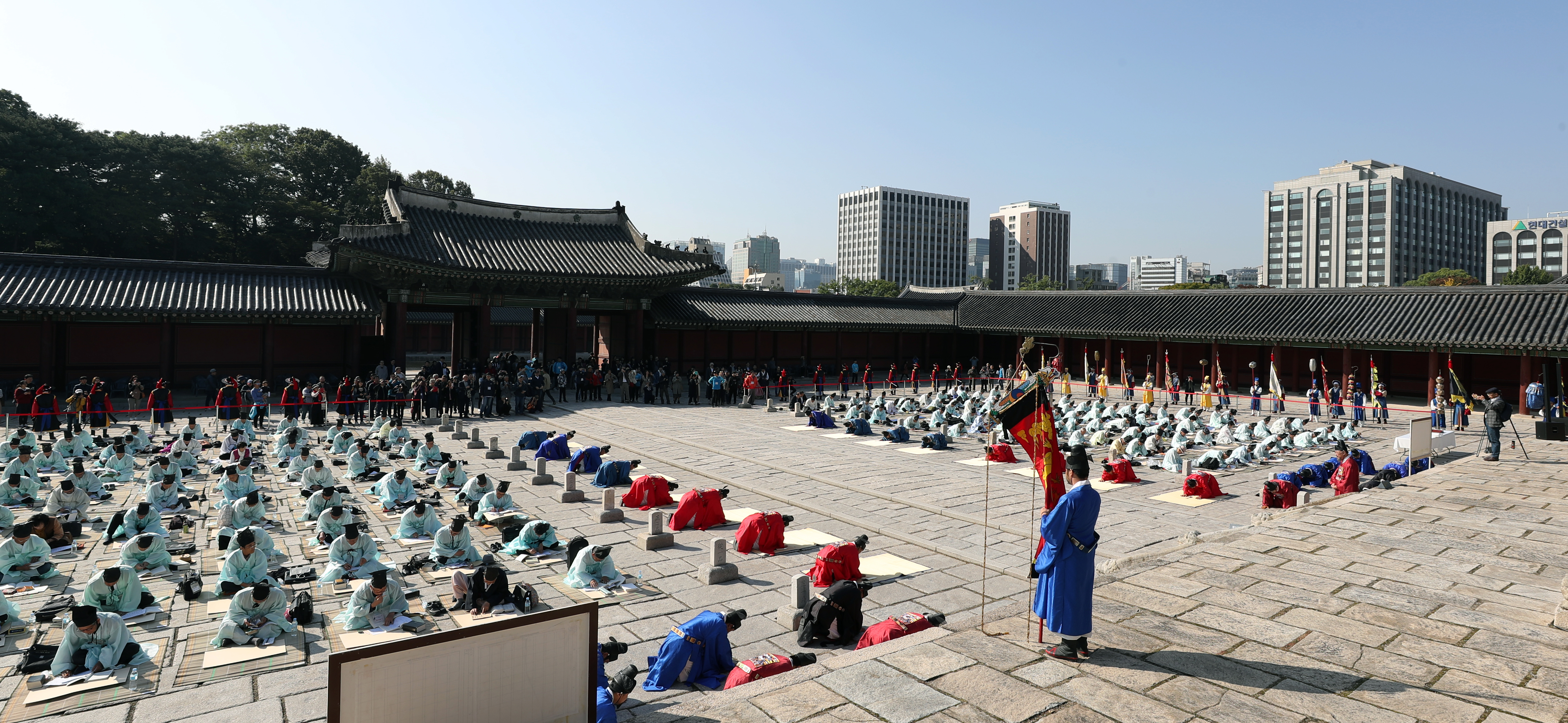
Modern reenactment of the exam being administered in the palace Changdeokgung (2018)

The gwageo were originally administered every three years; these regular examinations were known as the singnyeonsi (식년시). However, the singnyeonsi became less important over time, and an increasing percentage of candidates took the gwageo on special occasions. These included the alseongsi (visitation examinations), which were administered when the king visited the Shrine of Confucius at the Seonggyungwan royal academy, the jeunggwangsi (augmented examinations) held during national celebrations, and the byeolsi (special examinations) held on other special occasions. (Note: These translations are taken from Lee (1984), p. 181.) However, these special examinations were usually limited to the literary and military examinations. Over the course of the dynasty, a total of 581 irregular examinations were held, in comparison to 163 of the triennial singneonsi examinations.

The literary and military examinations were administered in three stages: an initial qualifying test (chosi) administered in the provinces, a second examination (hoesi) conducted in the capital (in which the qualifying candidates were selected), and a third examination (jeonsi) in the presence of the king, in which the successful candidates were ranked in order. Each stage was norm-referenced, with a set number of successful applicants. The candidate who received the highest score (jangwon) in the literary examination was given a post of the 6th junior (jong) rank. If the jangwon was already employed in a position of rank, he was raised 4 levels. The candidates with second and third highest scores were given posts of the 7th junior rank. The rest were not guaranteed a post, but had to wait until one became vacant. The miscellaneous examinations had only the first two stages; their candidates were not ranked.

Testing procedures were a frequent flashpoint of controversy, with various factions vying for control of the examination criteria. In particular, the question of whether the first phase of the higher examination should be oral or written became a hot topic of debate in early Joseon.

=== Literary examinations ===
The literary examination was divided into a lower and higher examination. In turn, in the lower literary examination some candidates applied for a "classics licentiate" (or saengwon) and others for a "literary licentiate" (or jinsa). After passing these lower examinations (saengjin-gwa), they could proceed to the higher examination. This lower examination may have originated in the entrance examinations for the Gukjagam of Goryeo.

In the lower examination, the literary licentiate tested compositional skill in various forms of Chinese poetry and prose, including shi poetry, fu rhyming prose, piao documentary prose, and ts'e problem-essays. The classics licentiate tested knowledge of the Four Books and Five Classics from an orthodox Neo-Confucian interpretation. From each regular administration of the test, a total of 100 successful candidates were selected for each licentiate. These were drawn from a pool of 600 (for each licentiate), of which 200 were chosen from the capital and 400 were apportioned from the various provinces. (Note: These figures are given by SNUERI (1997), but Byeon (1999, p. 278) says that the total number from the provinces was 700.)

The higher literary examination was administered every three years, and a total of 33 successful candidates were selected from a pool of 240. These 240, in turn, were sent from the Seonggyungwan (50), the capital (40), and the Eight Provinces (the number sent from each province varied, with Hwanghae and Yeongan sending only 10 while Gyeongsang sent 30). Each of the first two of the higher examination was in turn divided into three parts: in the first section, the candidates showed their understanding of the Confucian canon, in the second part they demonstrated their ability to compose in various literary forms, and in the last portion they wrote a problem-essay which was intended to show their political aptitude.

Over the course of the Joseon Dynasty, a total of 14,620 men passed the literary examination. The triennial singneonsi passed roughly 41% of these; the remainder passed in the course of irregular examinations. This proportion shifted over time; as the dynasty progressed, the irregular examinations became increasingly important. This may in part have been because the number of candidates in triennial examinations was fixed, while the number in the irregular examinations was not fixed.

=== Military examinations (mugwa) ===
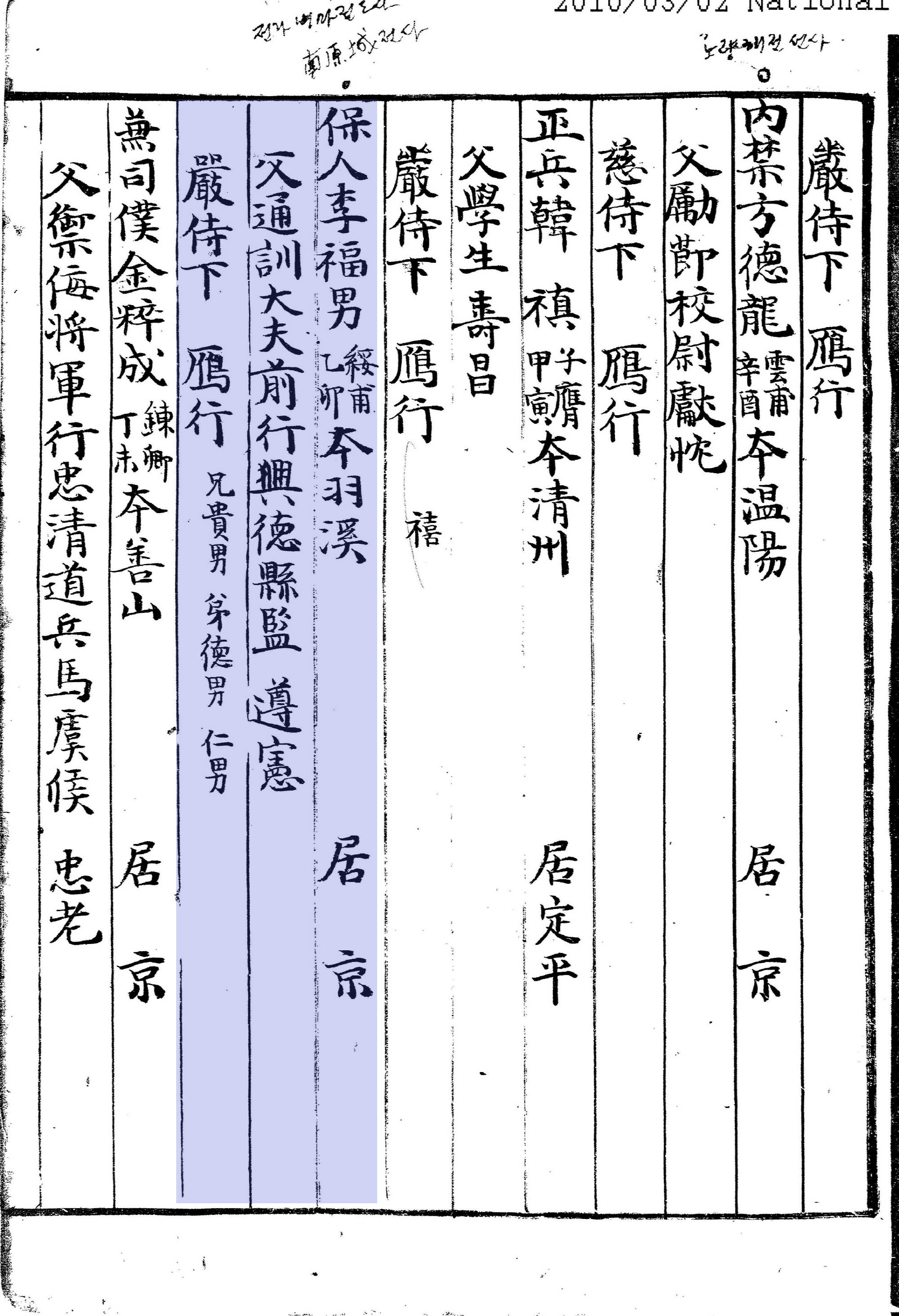
Military exam pass certificate, Joseon, 16 March 1588

Military examinations were instituted by the end of the Goryeo period and were continued in Joseon. The military exams tested a mixture of military arts as well as knowledge in the Classics and military texts. This included Korean archery, horsemanship, and mounted archery. The exam was carried out in three stages on a triennial basis. The first stage tested 190 or 200 candidates consisting of 70 candidates from the capital, 30 from Gyeongsang, 25 from Chungcheong and Jeolla, and the remaining provinces 10 candidates each. Out of the 190 candidates, 28 moved on to the second stage for an oral examination on their knowledge of the Confucian canon and certain military texts, including Sun Tzu's Art of War, the Wuzi and Hanbizi. The third stage tested horsemanship and mounted archery again. Those who passed the military exam were known as söndal (meaning those who were reading for appointment to office). The military examination was not considered as important as the civil counterpart. It later became an avenue through which the lowborn class (cheonmin) could advance their careers. (Note: Byeon (1999, p. 279) gives 200 for the initial stage, but agrees with 28 for the second stage.)

=== Miscellaneous examinations ===
The miscellaneous examinations, or japgwa, were divided into four parts: translation, medicine, natural science (astrology, geography, and others), and recordkeeping. These examinations were overseen by the government office which employed specialists in the field. They were closely connected to the Sahak royal technical academies, which were overseen by the same offices.

In the case of translation, the languages tested were the four in which the Joseon court maintained interpreters: contemporary Chinese, Mongolian, Jurchen/Manchu, and Japanese. This examination was overseen by the Bureau of Interpreters, which maintained interpreters in the capital and in the major border-ports and cities. At the first level, 45 candidates were accepted in spoken Chinese and 4 in each of the other languages; the second level selected 13 successful applicants in Chinese and 2 in each of the other languages.

The medical examination selected 18 finalists, narrowed to 9 successful applicants in the second round. These were then given positions in the Bureau of Medicine, which sent some of them to the palace and others to each provincial division down to the hyeon level.

Those who passed the japgwa were originally given a crimson certificate, the same color obtained by those who passed the literary examination. However, pressure from the yangban eventually changed this color to white, signifying a lower level of achievement and entitling the bearer to a position of lower rank. Those who passed this examination became known as chungin.

=== Historical change ===
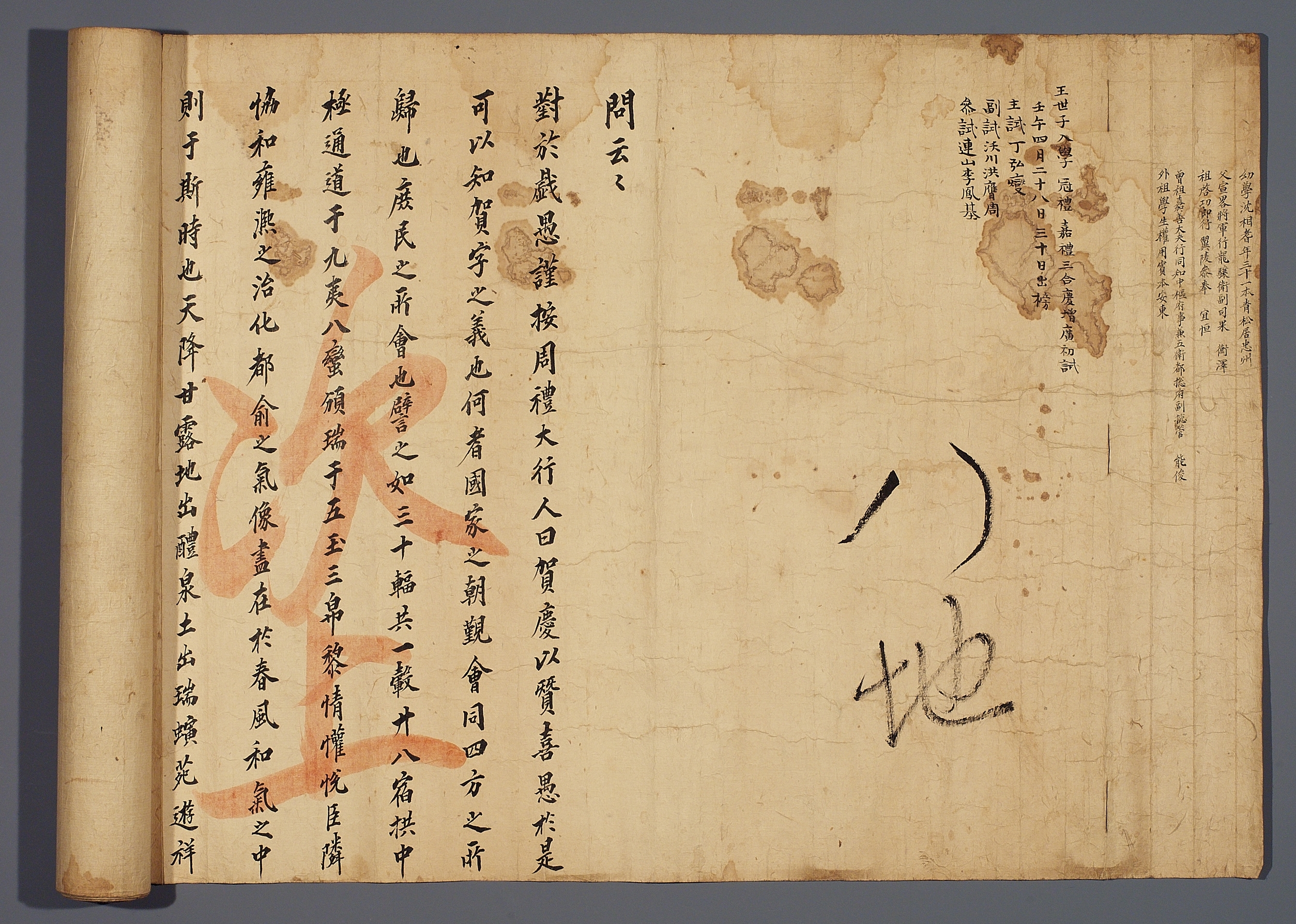
A Joseon-era gwageo answer sheet from a 31-year-old student who received a good score of chasang (차상; 次上).

The gwageo were supplemented in the reign of Jungjong of Joseon (1506–1544), at the suggestion of the high official Cho Kwangjo. The supplementary examination was called an "examination of the Sage and Good" (현량과; 賢良科; hyŏllyangkwa). This was an abbreviated examination, held in the presence of the king. The candidates had to be recommended by their local magistrate as men of the highest integrity.

The gwageo system became increasingly corrupt in the later years of the Joseon Dynasty. Scholars who were unable to pass the examination began to form a class of disaffected yangban; notable among these was early 19th-century rebel leader Hong Gyeong-nae. Many of the later Silhak scholars also turned away from state service.

The gwageo were finally abolished in the Gabo Reforms of 1894, along with legal class discrimination and the old rank system.

== See also ==
- Imperial examination
- Education in the Joseon Dynasty
- History of education
- Republic of Korea public service examinations
