= Kukhak =

Silla-era school in Korea

- Hangul: 국학
- Hanja: 國學
- RR: Gukhak
- MR: Kukhak

The Kukhak (Korean: 국학; Hanja: 國學) was the sole recorded institution of higher learning in the Silla period of medieval Korean history. It provided training in the Chinese classics. An earlier institution, the Taehak, had been founded in 372.

The Kukhak was established early in the Unified Silla period, in 682 (the second year of King Sinmun). During the reign of King Gyeongdeok (r. 742-765) its name was changed briefly to Taehakgam (대학감, 大學監) but reverted to Kukhak during the following reign of King Hyegong (r. 765-780). Like its counterpart in Tang China, the Kukhak was established primarily to train local officials in the Confucian classics and the composition skills requisite for the governance of an enlarged Silla state. The establishment of such an institution was increasingly critical by the 7th century with the maturation of Silla's bureaucratic system modeled upon that of Tang China.

The Kukhak was superseded by the Gukjagam, which was established in Gaegyeong in 992 during the Goryeo dynasty.

== Entrance qualifications ==
Students were able to enter Kukhak from 15 to 30 years old. When they graduated from the Kukhak, they were given the title of Nama or 'Taema'. It is estimated that most of the students were of the sixth head rank.

== See also ==
- Korean Confucianism
- Gukjagam
- Seonggyungwan
- Guozijian, the Tang Dynasty model for the Kukhak.
