= An (Korean surname) =

- Hangul: 안
- Hanja: 安
- RR: An
- MR: An

An, also romanized Ahn, is a Korean family name. A total of 109 Korean clans are named 'An', but with different origins. In 2000, there were 637,786 people bearing this surname in South Korea, making it the 20th most common family name in the country, with roughly 2% of the country's population. North Korea does not release figures for surnames, but the percentage is expected to be more than in South Korea.

== Clan ==
In the traditional Korean clan system, which is still the basis of family registry in South Korea, each clan is distinguished by its bongwan, the notional ancestral seat of the clan. Typically, each clan claims a different person as its founder, although there are exceptions. A total of 109 An clans are extant today. However, most of these are very small. The majority of Ans claim to be members of the Sunheung Ahn clan. The Kwangju and Juksan clans are also quite large; in addition to these, the Tamjin, Gongsan, Chungju, Dongju, Jeuongwon, Ansan, Jecheon, Angang, and Jucheon clans are significant as well.

=== Sunheung clan ===
A total of 73.5% of those with the Korean surname 'Ahn' belong to the Sunheung clan. The 2000 South Korean census counted 468,827 members of the "Sunheung" Ahn clan. It is a native clan connected with the town of Sunheung, Korea. The Sunheung clan was the most noble and powerful clan among clans with the surname An, and was one of the Six Greatest Clans of all Korean clans during the Goryeo dynasty and early Joseon dynasty.

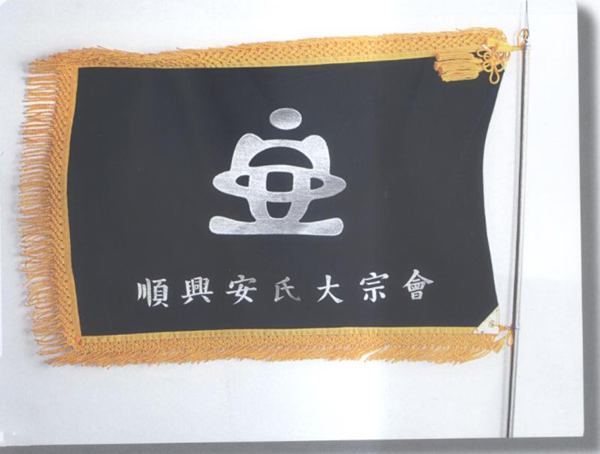
The crest of clan Ahn of Sunheung

=== Juksan clan ===
The Juksan Ahn clan came from Ahngukjishin which means "the general who made the country peaceful". Three brothers, viz. Lee Jichun, Lee Yeopchun and Lee Hwachun, achieved a great victory against Japan in the Silla period. Juksan is a town name in Anseong. Lee Jichun changed his name to Ahn Bangjun, and is the founder of the Juksan clan.

=== Gwangju clan ===
Ahn Banggeol is the founder of the Gwangju clan. The clan had 43,609 members in 2000 in South Korea, and 48,033 members in 2015 in South Korea. The population in North Korea is unknown.

=== Tamjin clan ===
The 2015 South Korean census counted 26,098 people of the "Tamjin" Ahn clan. It is a native clan connected with the Gangjin. Tamjin is an old name (before 14C) of Gangjin. Ahn Woo is the founder of Tamjin clan. Ahn Woo put down the rebellion of Cho Il-shin as a Gunbupanseo (kind of military officer) in 1362. Ki Ch'ŏl, who was the brother of Empress Gi, exerted his authority in Korea, and he had the Mongol Empire at his back. Ahn Woo put Ki Ch'ŏl to death. Ahn Woo put Red Turbans to rout who captured Uiju County and Chongju, as Northwest military commander. Also, Ahn Ji, who was a renowned scholar, who was one of the writers of Yongbieocheonga is from the Tamjin clan.

== Notable people with the surname ==
- An Ba-ul (born 1994), South Korean judoka
- Ahn Bo-hyun (born 1988), South Korean actor, model, and television personality
- An Byeong-hun (born 1991), South Korean professional golfer
- Ahn Byong-man (1941–2022), South Korean academic
- Ahn Chai-hong (1891–1965), Korean activist, politician, and journalist
- Ahn Chang-ho (1878–1938), Korean politician and independence activist
- An Chang-nam (1901–1930), first Korean aviator
- An Chang-rim (born 1994), South Korean retired judoka
- Ahn Cheol-soo (born 1962), South Korean politician, physician, and software entrepreneur
- Ahn Chil-hyun (stage name Kangta, born 1979), South Korean singer-songwriter, member of boy band H.O.T.
- Ahn Daniel (stage name Niel, born 1994), South Korean singer, member of boy band Teen Top
- Danny Ahn (born 1978), South Korean-American singer and actor, member of boy band g.o.d
- Ahn Eak-tai (1906–1965), South Korean classical composer and conductor
- Ahn Eun-jin (born 1991), South Korean actress
- Ahn Gil-kang (born 1966), South Korean actor
- Ahn Gooc-jin (born 1980), South Korean film director and screenwriter
- Ahn Gwi-ryeong (born 1989), South Korean politician
- An Gyeong-ja (born 1950), South Korean volleyball player
- Ahn Hae-ryong (born 1961), South Korean documentary filmmaker and cinematographer
- Ahn Hak-sop (born 1930), North Korean former soldier and prisoner of war
- Ahn Hee-jung (born 1965), South Korean politician
- Ahn Hee-yeon (stage name Hani, born 1992), South Korean singer and actress, member of girl group EXID
- An Hyang (1243–1306), Confucian scholar
- Ahn Hye-jin (stage name Hwasa, born 1995), South Korean singer, member of girl group Mamamoo
- An Hye-jin (born 1998), South Korean professional volleyball player
- Ahn Hyeon-beom (born 1994), South Korean footballer
- Ahn Hyo-jin (stage name Elly, born 1991), South Korean rapper, member of girl group EXID
- Ahn Hyo-seop, (born 1995), Canadian actor
- Ahn Hyun-min (born 2003), South Korean baseball player
- Ahn Hyun-suk (born 1984), South Korean former badminton player
- An Ik-soo (born 1965), South Korean football manager and former player
- An Il-bom (born 1990), North Korean footballer
- Ahn In-sook (born 1952), South Korean actress
- Ahn In-Young (born 1956), South Korean scientist, first South Korean woman to visit Antarctica, first Asian woman to become an Antarctic station leader
- Ahn Jae-chang (born 1972), South Korean retired badminton player
- Ahn Jae-hong, (born 1986), South Korean actor
- Ahn Jae-hwan (1972–2008), South Korean actor
- Ahn Jae-hyun, (born 1987), South Korean model and actor
- An Jae-hyun (born 1999), South Korean table tennis player
- Ahn Jae-mo (born 1979), South Korean actor and singer
- An Jae-song (born 1934), South Korean former sport shooter
- Ahn Jae-wook (born 1971), South Korean actor and singer
- Ahn Ji-ho (footballer) (born 1987), South Korean footballer
- Ahn Ji-ho (actor) (born 2004), South Korean actor
- Ahn Ji-hwan (born 1969), South Korean voice actor
- Ahn Ji-hye (born 1987), South Korean actress
- Ahn Ji-hyun (born 1992), South Korean actress
- Ahn Ji-young (born 1995), South Korean singer-songwriter, member of Bolbbalgan4
- Ahn Jin-beom (born 1992), South Korean footballer
- Ahn Jin-hui (born 1991), South Korean ice hockey player
- Ahn Jin-soo (born 1973), South Korean cross-country skier
- Joo Won Ahn (born 1993), South Korean ballet dancer
- Ahn Joon-soo (born 1998), South Korean footballer
- Ahn Joon-sung (born 1997), South Korean judoka
- An Jung-geun (1879–1910), Korean independence activist
- Ahn Jung-hwan (born 1976), South Korean former professional footballer
- Ahn Jung-hyo (1941–2023), South Korean novelist and translator
- Ahn Geon-ho (stage name Keonho, born 2009), South Korean singer-songwriter and member of Cortis
- Kyongwon Ahn (born 1937), South Korean taekwondo master
- Mikhail An (1952–1979), Soviet footballer
- An Myong-ok, North Korean politician
- Ahn Nae-sang (born 1964), South Korean actor
- Philip Ahn (1905–1978), Korean-American actor and activist
- Priscilla Ahn (born 1984), American musician
- An Sae-hee (born 1991), South Korean professional footballer
- Ahn Sahng-hong (1918–1985), South Korean religious leader
- Ahn Sanghak (born 1962), South Korean poet
- An Sang-hyun (born 1986), South Korean footballer
- Ahn Sang-soo (Changwon mayor) (born 1946), South Korean politician
- Ahn Sang-soo (Incheon mayor) (born 1946), South Korean politician
- Ahn Sang-soo (typographic designer) (born 1952), South Korean leading typographic designer
- Ahn Sang-yeong (1938–2004), South Korean politician, former mayor of Busan
- An Se-young (born 2002), South Korean badminton player
- Ahn Seo-hyun (born 2004), South Korean actress
- Ahn Shi-hyun (born 1984), South Korean professional golfer
- Ahn So-hee (born 1992), South Korean actress and former singer, former member of girl group Wonder Girls
- Ahn Sol-bin (born 1997), South Korean singer, member of girl group Laboum
- Ahn Soo-kyeong (born 1987), South Korean sport shooter
- Ahn Sook-sun (born 1949), South Korean pansori singer
- An Su-gil (1911–1977), Korean novelist and journalist
- Ahn Suk-hwan (born 1959), South Korean actor
- Ahn Sung-jae (born 1982), South Korean chef
- Ahn Sung-ki (1952–2026), South Korean actor
- Ahn Sung-nam (born 1984), South Korean footballer
- Ahn Tae-eun (born 1985), South Korean footballer
- An Tae-hyun (born 1993), South Korean footballer
- Ahn Tae-jin (born 1972), South Korean film director and filmmaker
- An Tae-song (born 1993), North Korean footballer
- An To-ch'i (?–1363), Goryeo eunuch
- Tony Ahn (born 1978), South Korean singer, member of boy band H.O.T.
- Viktor An (born 1985), South Korean-born Russian short-track speed skating coach
- Ahn Woo-yeon (born 1991), South Korean actor
- Ahn Yang-ok (born 1957), South Korean academic
- Ahn Ye-eun (born 1992), South Korean singer-songwriter
- An Ye-seul (born 1995), South Korean singer
- Ahn Yeon-seok (stage name Yoo Yeon-seok, born 1984), South Korean actor
- Ahn Yong-joon (born 1987), South Korean actor
- Ahn Yoo-jin (born 1968), South Korean choreographer, dancer, university professor
- Yoon Ahn (born 1976), Korean American businesswoman and fashion designer
- Ahn Young-kyu (born 1989), South Korean footballer
- Ahn Young-mi (born 1983), South Korean comedian
- An Yu-jin (born 2003), South Korean singer, member of girl group IVE

== See also ==
- Ahn Trio, a classical piano trio
- List of Korean family names
- Korean name
- Korean culture
