= Punggi =

Town in North Gyeongsang Province, South Korea

- Town (eup)
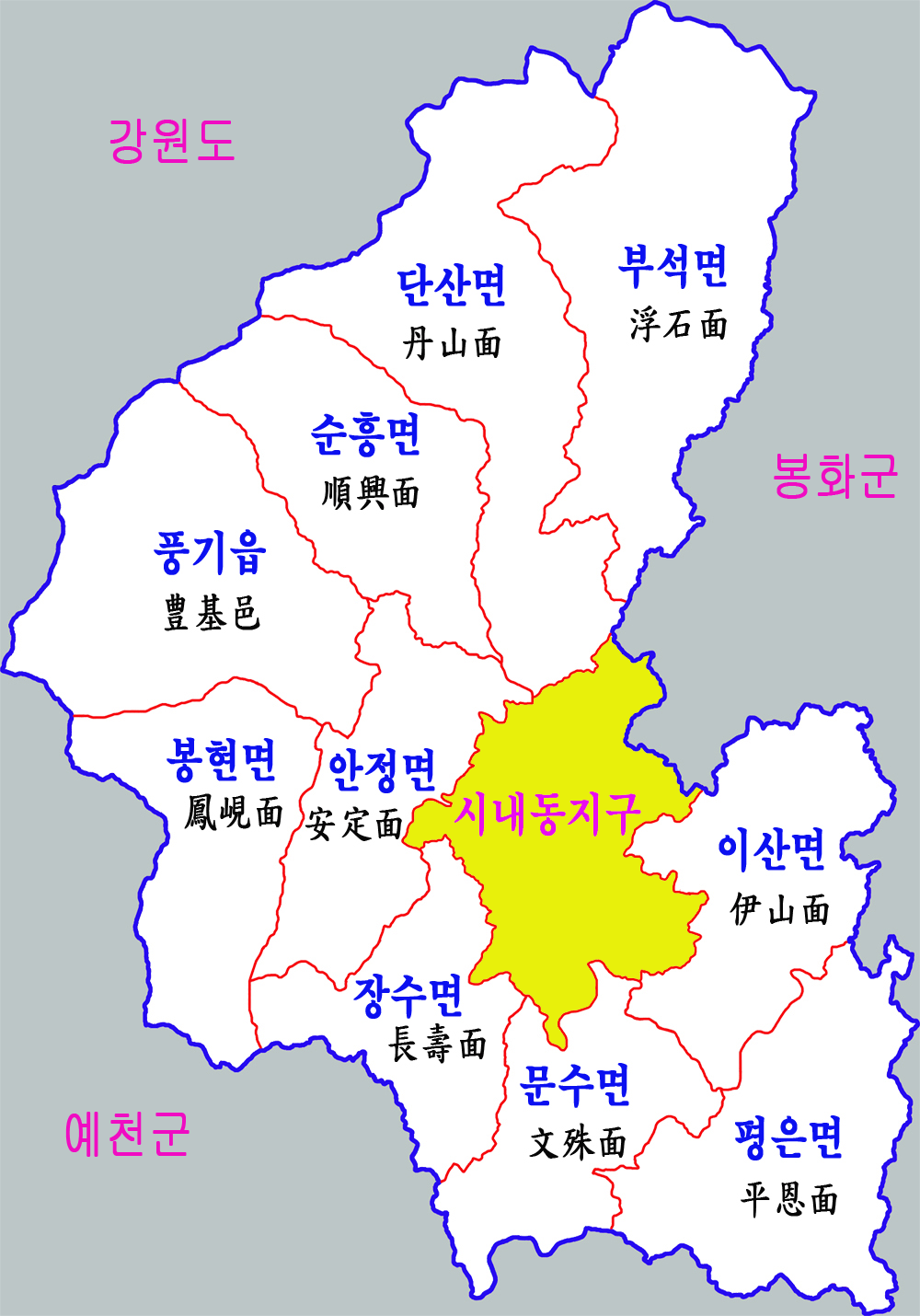
- Map of Yeongju

- Location in South Korea
- Coordinates: 36°52′30″N 128°31′30″E
- Country: South Korea
- Province: North Gyeongsang Province
- City: Yeongju

Area
  - Total: 76.75 km^{2} (29.63 sq mi)

Population (2020)
  - Total: 11,546
  - Density: 150.4/km^{2} (390/sq mi)
- Postal code: 36024

Korean name
- Hangul: 풍기읍
- Hanja: 豊基邑
- RR: Punggi-eup
- MR: P'unggi-ŭp

Punggi-eup (Korean: 풍기읍) is a town (eup) in Yeongju, North Gyeongsang Province, South Korea. At the 2020 census, Punggi-eup had a population of 11,546, down from 14,270 in 2005.

== History ==
The name Punggi combines characters from Eunpung (殷豊) and Gicheon (基川), two older place names in the area, and dates to the Goryeo dynasty. During the Joseon period, Punggi was the seat of Punggi County. In 1542, the county magistrate Chu Sebung founded Sosu Seowon, the first seowon (private Confucian academy) in Korea, in nearby Sunheung-myeon.

In 1914, the townships of Dongbu-myeon, Seobu-myeon, and Changnak-myeon were merged into Punggi-myeon under Yeongju-gun. Punggi was elevated to town (eup) status on 1 July 1973. It became part of the current Yeongju city on 1 January 1995, when Yeongju-si and Yeongpung-gun were merged.

== Demographics ==
Population census
| Year | Population |
|---|---|
| 2005 | 14,270 |
| 2010 | 14,178 |
| 2015 | 13,930 |
| 2020 | 11,546 |

At the 2020 census, 28.9% of the population was aged 65 or older. The town had 11,357 Korean nationals and 189 foreign residents.

== Economy ==
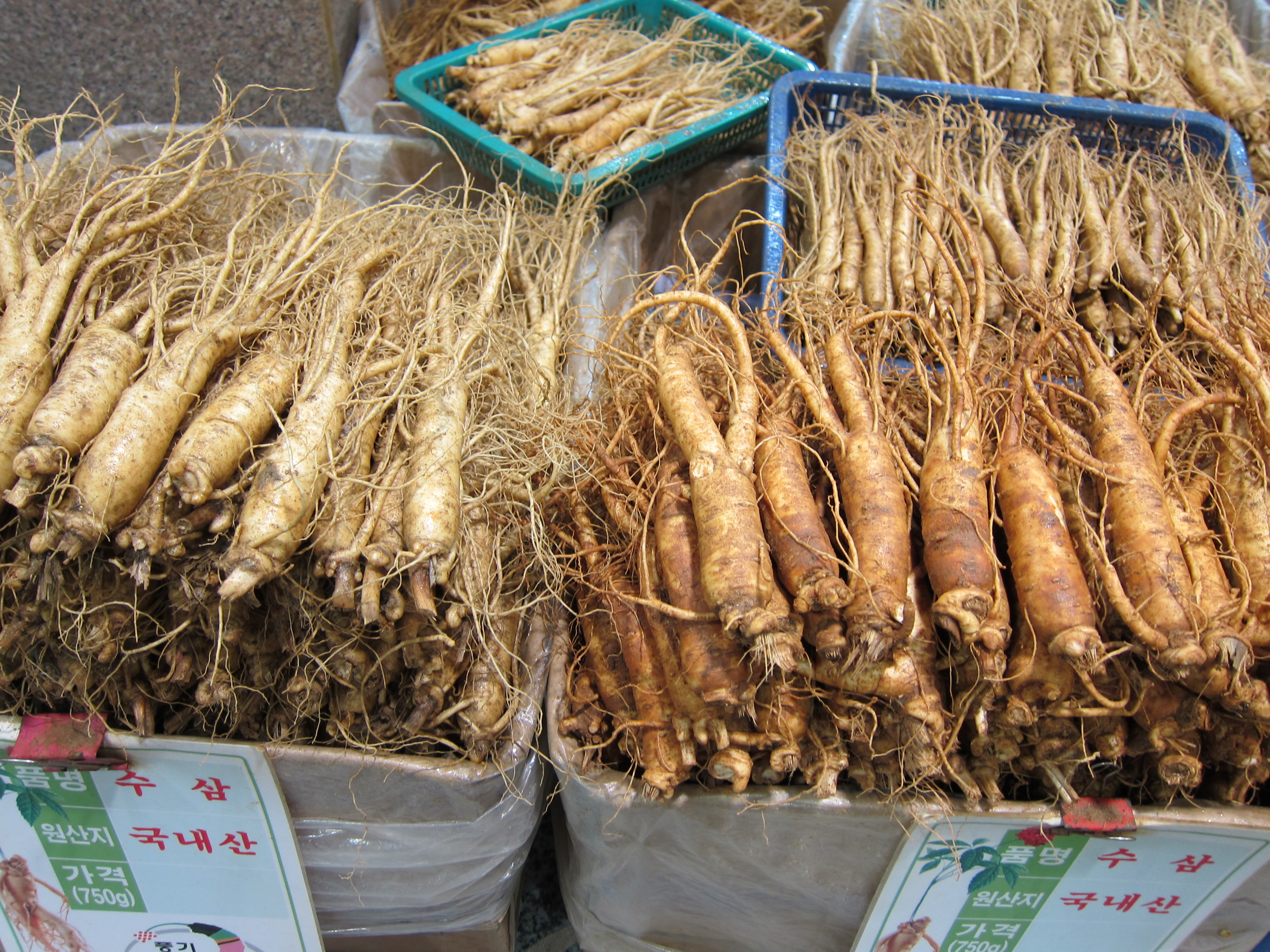
Punggi ginseng

Punggi is known throughout South Korea for the cultivation of Korean ginseng. The town's ginseng market is one of the major ginseng trading centres in the country. Other local products include apples and Hanwoo beef.

== Landmarks ==
A portion of Sobaeksan National Park lies within Punggi-eup's boundaries. On the Sobaeksan mountain, there is Huibangsa Temple which is a tourist attraction. The Memorial Park for the Korea Liberation Corps is also located in the town. Dongyang University has its campus in Punggi-eup. Punggi Hot Springs (풍기온천) is a local thermal bath facility.

== Administrative subdivisions ==
Punggi-eup comprises 14 legal-ri (법정리):

- Seongnae-ri (성내리)
- Dongbu-ri (동부리)
- Sanbeop-ri (산법리)
- Migok-ri (미곡리)
- Samga-ri (삼가리)
- Ukgeum-ri (욱금리)
- Geumgye-ri (금계리)
- Gyochon-ri (교촌리)
- Seobu-ri (서부리)
- Baek-ri (백리)
- Baeksin-ri (백신리)
- Changrak-ri (창락리)
- Sucheol-ri (수철리)
- Jeongu-ri (전구리)

== See also ==
- Sosu Seowon
- Subdivisions of South Korea
