= Sunheung =

Township in North Gyeongsang, South Korea

Coordinates: 36°54′52″N 128°34′33″E

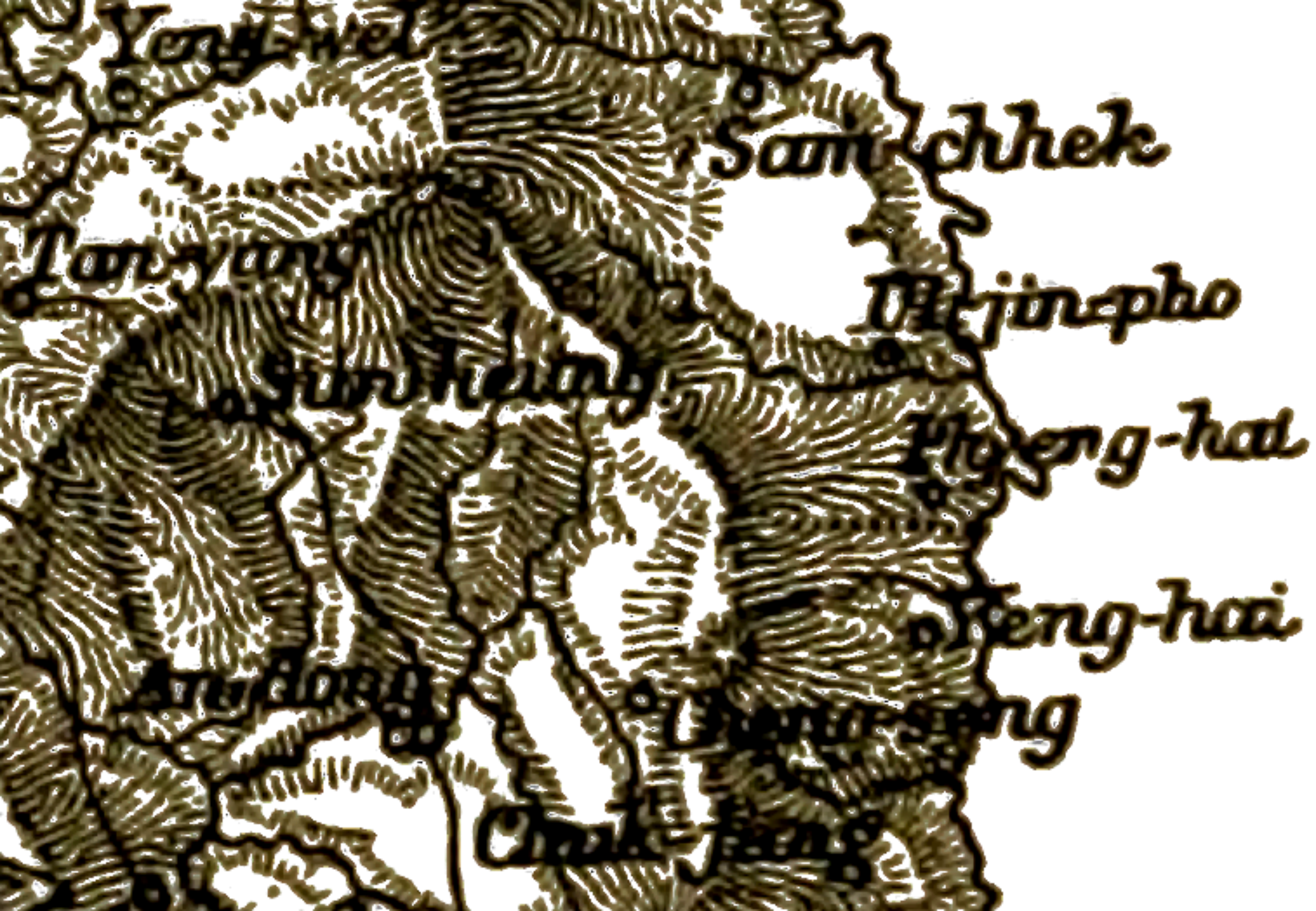
- A detail from a 1904 map of Korea, showing "Sun-heung" as the largest town northwest of the provincial capital Andong

Korean name
- Hangul: 순흥면
- Hanja: 順興面
- Lit.: Township of Following Prosperity
- RR: Sunheung-myeon
- MR: Sunhŭng-myŏn

Sunheung (Korean: 순흥) is a township administered as part of the municipality of Yeongju in North Gyeongsang, South Korea. The present local government administers an area of 54.35 square kilometers (20.98 sq mi).

Located in Sunheung is Sosu Seowon, a Neo-Confucian Academy built in the 16th century and today a UNESCO World Heritage Site.

== Name ==
Sunheung is an anglicization of the McCune–Reischauer romanization Sunhŭng. Its official romanization in South Korea is Sunheung. In 19th century sources, Sunheung appears as Sioun-heng-fu, from a French transcription of the Korean placename and the Chinese pronunciation of its status as the seat of a district or commandery. Although the name literally means "Adhering to", "Obeying", or "Following Prosperity" or "Success", Sunheung is also bongwan of a Korean clan in the area which included the influential Korean Confucianist An Hyang.

== History ==
Under the late Joseon dynasty, Sunheung was a district capital overseeing the plains and hinterland around Mount Taebaek. Its mountains were the site of Korea's first foreign mining concern, a silver mine whose permit was revoked by the royal court in Seoul after a few months of operation in the early 1850s.

== See also ==
- List of South Korean townships
- Ahn (Korean surname)#Sunheung Clan (Dominant Clan)
