= Yi Yuksa Literary Museum =

Coordinates: 36.7390°N 128.8632°E

- Established: 2004; 22 years ago
- Location: Andong, South Korea
- Type: Literary Museum
- Website: 264.or.kr

Korean name
- Hangul: 이육사문학관
- Hanja: 李陸史文學館
- RR: I Yuksa munhakgwan
- MR: I Yuksa munhakkwan

Yi Yuksa Literary Museum (Korean: 이육사문학관) is a memorial hall built in Andong in 2004 to honor Yi Yuksa's life and literature. Yi Yuksa was anti-Japanese poet of the Japanese occupation. Yi Yuksa Literary Museum exhibits his historical data and achievements of the poet. It consists of an exhibition hall and a birthplace.
