= Punggi Jin clan =

Korean clan from North Gyeongsang Province

- Country: Korea
- Current region: Yeongju
- Founder: Jin Pil myeong
- Connected members: Jin Jong-oh

Punggi Jin clan (Korean: 풍기 진씨; Hanja: 豊基 秦氏) is one of the Korean clans. Their Bon-gwan is in Yeongju, North Gyeongsang Province. According to the research held in 2000, the number of Punggi Jin clan’s member was 11046. Their founder was Jin Pil myeong who worked as the deputy minister of defense (兵部侍郎, Bingbu Shilang) in Tang dynasty during Emperor Gaozong of Tang’s reign. Jin Pil myeong collapsed Baekje in 660 with Su Dingfang who was a four-star rank as the Silla-Tang alliance‘s general. After that, Jin Pil myeong was naturalized in Silla.

== See also ==
- Korean clan names of foreign origin
