= Dongyang University =

University in Yeongju, South Korea

Coordinates: 36.8832°N 128.5338°E

- Hangul: 동양대학교
- Hanja: 東洋大學校
- RR: Dongyang daehakgyo
- MR: Tongyang taehakkyo

Dongyang University (Korean: 동양대학교) is a private university located in Yeongju, South Korea.

The graduating class of 2012 numbered 672. The current president is Sung-Hae Choi (최성해).

== Academics ==
A variety of doctoral and master's programs are also provided, mostly in engineering-related fields. It has been designated as a capacity-building university in the basic competency evaluation of universities.

== Location ==
The main campus is situated in Punggi-eup, an outlying region of Yeongju City.

There is a second campus located in Dongducheon. Dongducheon is a collection of art departments.

It is a private university located in South Korea.

== Controversies ==
In 2019, the South Korean ministry of education and members of the ruling Democratic Party requested that Dongyang University fire President Choi for lying about his academic history to the government, on that grounds that three of the five degrees he claimed to have received were fake. The request was in response to Choi's report to local media that Chung Kyung-sim, an English professor at the university and the wife of the former Justice Minister Cho Kuk, forged a Dongyang's dean's award for her daughter's application to attend medical school at Pusan National University. Choi's statement was a key part of the prosecution's probe against Cho, who resigned 35 days after his appointed as the Justice Minister on 9 September 2019.

== See also ==
- List of colleges and universities in South Korea
- Education in South Korea
