= KFTA =

KFTA may refer to:

- Kangaroo Flats Training Area, a military training area in the Northern Territory of Australia
- KFTA-TV, a television station (channel 27) licensed to Fort Smith, Arkansas, United States
- KKRK, a radio station (970 AM) licensed to Rupert, Idaho, United States, which held the call sign KFTA from 2000 to 2014
- The Korean Federation of Teachers' Associations, the largest teachers' union in South Korea
