= Minjok jeonggi =

Korean-language nationalist term

Minjok jeonggi (Korean: 민족정기; Hanja: 民族情氣 or 民族正氣; lit. 'spirit of the nation' or 'national spirit') is a Korean word mainly used by Korean nationalists, which means "correct and great ethos as the common will of the nation". This word is also related to the Korean independence movement and the South Korean democracy movement.

== History ==
The term was used by Korean independence activists who opposed Japanese imperialism when they translated the German word Volksgeist into Korean language.

In the 1990s, anti-colonialists and pro-democracy activists argued that they should cultivate minjok jeonggi by removing the legacies of pro-Japanese collaborators ("Chinilpa") that could not be liquidated during the dictatorship that existed after the establishment of South Korea.

It is used not only as a general term but also as an administrative term. Act on the Honorable Treatment of Persons of Distinguished Service to Independence has the phrase "to exist the 'national spirit' [minjok jeonggi] by encouraging patriotism"; this law was enacted on December 31, 1994.

== See also ==
- Left-wing nationalism in South Korea
- Liberation Association
- Paegŭiminjok
- Yamato-damashii, a Japanese word similar to minjok jeonggi.
