= An Hyang =

Korean philosopher (1243–1306)

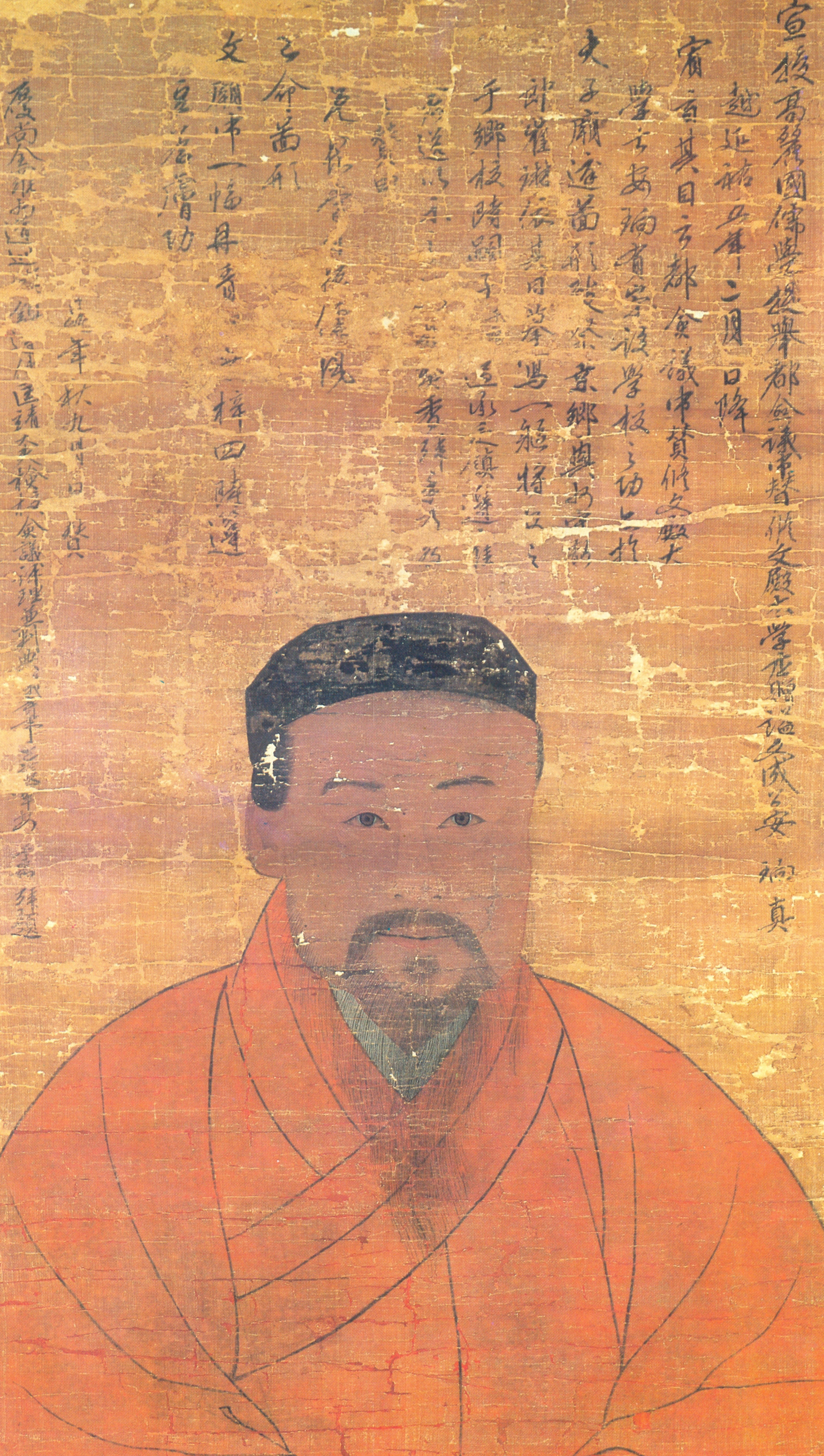
- Portrait of An Hyang, held by Sosu Seowon, Yeongju, North Gyeongsang Province

Korean name
- Hangul: 안향
- Hanja: 安珦
- RR: An Hyang
- MR: An Hyang

Art name
- Hangul: 회헌
- Hanja: 晦軒
- RR: Hoeheon
- MR: Hoehŏn

Courtesy name
- Hangul: 사온
- Hanja: 士蘊
- RR: Saon
- MR: Saon

Posthumous name
- Hangul: 문성
- Hanja: 文成
- RR: Munseong
- MR: Munsŏng

An Hyang (Korean: 안향; Hanja: 安珦; 1243 – 12 September 1306), also known as An Yu (안유; 安裕), was a leading Confucian scholar born in Yeongju in present-day South Korea, and was from the Sunheung An clan. He is considered the founder of Neo-Confucianism in Korea, introducing Song Confucianism to the Goryeo kingdom. An Hyang visited China, transcribing the works of Zhu Xi and bringing his copy and portraits of Confucius and Zhu Xi to Korea to use in his revitalization of Confucianism. He strove to replace Buddhism with Confucianism.

There is a portrait of him at the Sosu Seowon, which was built as a memorial to the scholar. There is also a statue of him on Banya-san in Nonsan.

== Family ==
- Father
  - An Pu (안부; 安孚; 1220 – ?)
- Mother
  - Princess Consort Sunjeong of the Gangju U clan (순정군부인 강주우씨; 順政郡夫人 剛州禹氏)
- Wives and their children
  - Princess Consort Hannam of the Kim clan (한남군부인 김씨; 漢南郡夫人 金氏); Kim Rok-yeon's third daughter (김록연,金祿延)
    - Son - An U-gi (안우기; 安于器; 1265–1329)
    - Daughter - Lady An of the Sunheung An clan (순흥 안씨; 順興 安氏)
    - Daughter - Lady An of the Sunheung An clan (순흥 안씨; 順興 安氏)
    - Daughter - Lady An of the Sunheung An clan (순흥 안씨; 順興 安氏)
    - Daughter - Lady An of the Sunheung An clan (순흥 안씨; 順興 安氏)
    - Daughter - Lady An of the Sunheung An clan (순흥 안씨; 順興 安氏)
  - Princess Consort Seowon of the Yŏm clan (서원군부인 염씨; 瑞原郡夫人 廉氏); daughter of Yŏm Su-jang (염수장; 廉守藏) — No issue.
