= Korea Liberation Corps =

1913–1918 Korean pro-independence group

- Hangul: 대한광복단
- Hanja: 大韓光復團
- RR: Daehan gwangbokdan
- MR: Taehan kwangboktan

The Korea Liberation Corps (Korean: 대한광복단) was a Korean association formed in 1913 to fight against Japanese rule. At its height its members numbered about 200. The Korea Liberation Association (대한광복회, 大韓光復會) was a successor organization to Korea Liberation Corps.

The corps was initially organized in Punggi by Kim Byeong-yeol, Kang Byeong-su, Yu Chang-sun, Jang Du-hwan, Yi Gak, Han Hun, Yu Jang-yeol, Jeong Jin-hwa, Chae Gi-jung, Jeong Man-gyo, Hwang Sang-gyu, Kim Sang-ok, and Jeong Un-hong. This group is sometimes called the "Punggi Gwangbokdan," or Punggi Liberation Corps. In 1915 this group united with a group of independence leaders in Daegu at an assembly in Dalseong Park, to officially form the Korea Liberation Corps. Its first commander-in-chief was Park Sang-jin. This anti-Japanese independence group sourced money for the training of troops, trained troops, planned assassinations of pro-Japanese Koreans (and other pro-Japanese in Korea), formed a provisional government, and worked with domestic and foreign organizations (to increase foreign understanding of Korea under Japanese occupation and get foreign funding) in the 1910s.

A memorial park for the corps was created in Punggi-eup in 1994 and completed in 2003.

== See also ==
- History of Korea
- Korean independence movement
- Liberation Association
- List of militant Korean independence activist organizations
