= Liberation Association =

Association of Korean activists

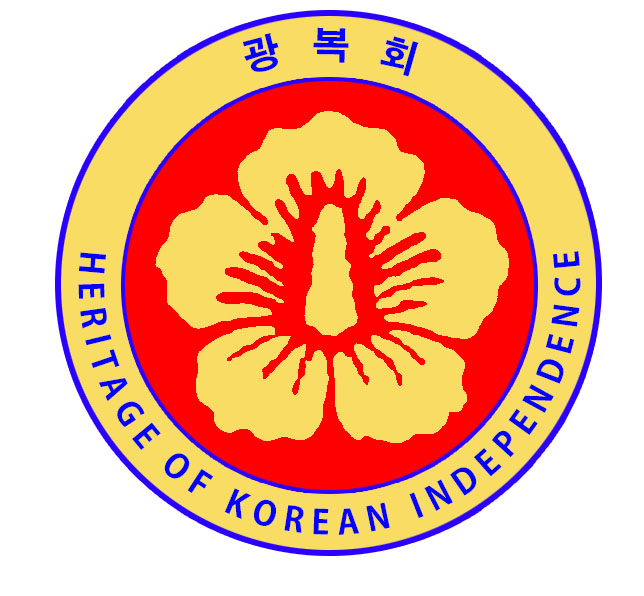
Logo

The Liberation Association (Korean: 광복회; Hanja: 光復會; lit. 'Conference of the Light Returned') or Korea Liberation Association is an organization formed by Korean independence activists, their descendants, and bereaved families in the South Korea and aims to promote "promote national spirit and socialize among members"; this organization is South Korean legal entities.

This organization is a legal entity established under Act on the Establishment of Associations by Persons of Distinguished Service to the State (Korean: 국가유공자 등 단체 설립에 관한 법률).

== History ==
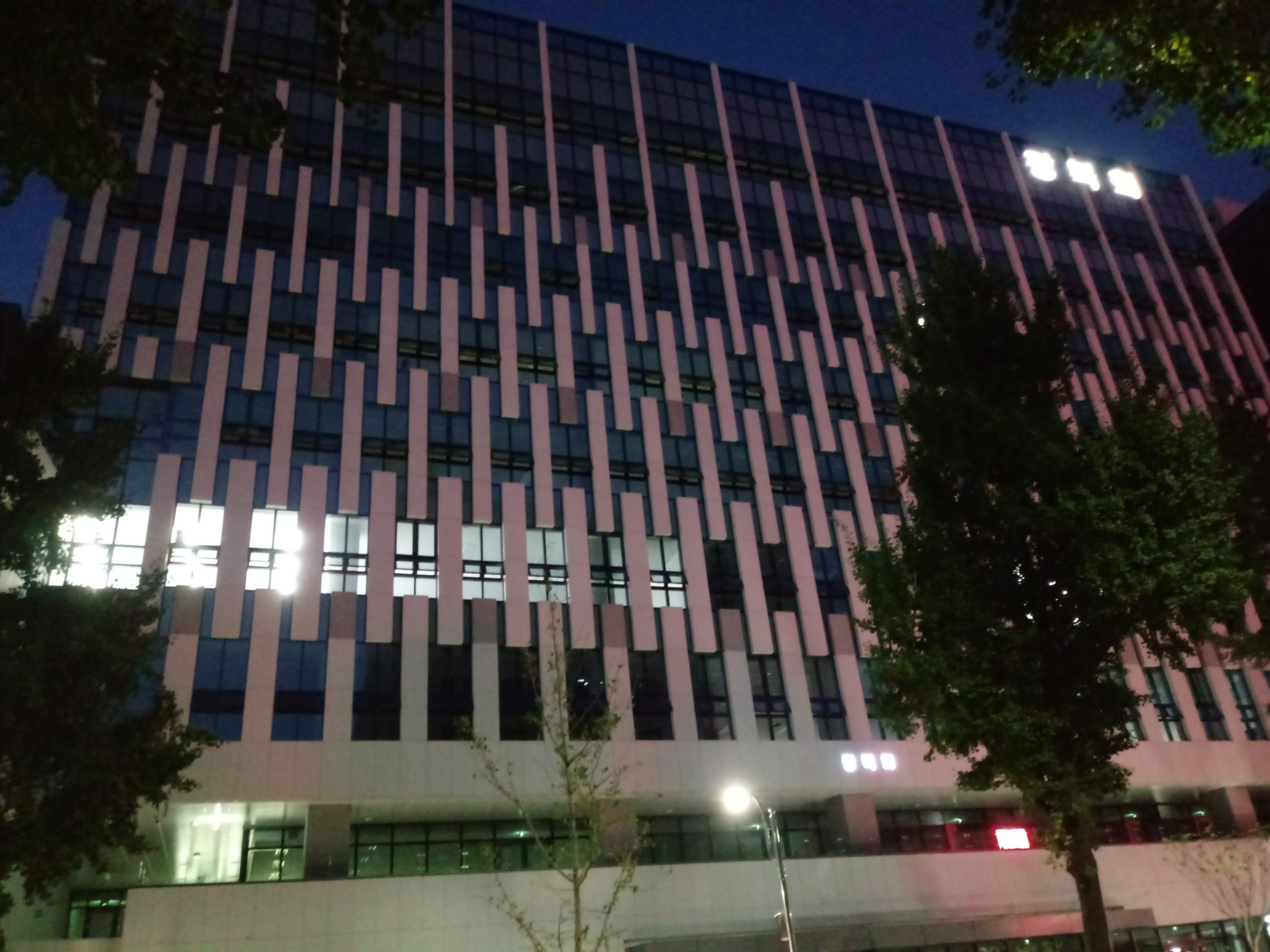
Liberation Association Building in Yeongdeungpo District, Seoul

The organization was founded on February 27, 1965 and its first chairman is Lee Kap-sung, who was one of 33 national representatives at March First Movement.

At a press conference with parliamentarian Sul Hoon in April 2020, the organization called for a "law banning pro-Japanese praise" (친일찬양금지법) to be pursued, which would criminalize anyone who expressed glorification of Japanese colonial era.

== See also ==
- Independence Club
- Korea Liberation Corps
- National Liberation Day of Korea
