= Ahn Yoo-jin =

South Korean choreographer, dancer

- Born: 1968 (age 57–58); Seoul, South Korea
- Other name: Xena Ahn
- Occupations: choreographer, dancer and university professor
- Years active: 1995–present

Korean name
- Hangul: 안유진
- RR: An Yujin
- MR: An Yujin

Ahn Yoo-jin (Korean: 안유진; born 1968) is a South Korean choreographer, dancer and university professor. She is famous for introducing and popularizing belly dance in South Korea.

== Life ==
Ahn Yoo-jin became known by the name Xena Ahn when she emigrated to Australia in 1988. She first encountered belly dancing from a female dancer who lived in her neighbor's house. In the early 1990s, she qualified as a belly dance instructor at an art school located in several cities in Turkey.

Ahn Yoo-jin first introduced belly dance to South Korea in 1995 when she founded "Bellydance Korea", South Korean first educational institution specializing in belly dance. She also created a new belly dance style adapted to Korean people's body shape and emotions. In 1998, she participated in a belly dance performance hosted by Walt Disney Korea at the Hilton Hotel in Seoul. Ahn Yoo-jin, a professor of practical dance at the Seoul National University of Arts, served as chairman of the Korea Belly Dance Association and CEO of Belly Dance Korea, appearing in various broadcasting and magazines to introduce belly dance while training several leaders and dancers.

Ahn Yoo-jin was appointed as a part-time lecturer specializing in the elementary belly dance course at Kwangju Women's University in February 2006. However, she was indicted without detention by the Seoul Central District Prosecutors' Office in November 2007 on charges of exercising false documents after forging a diploma under the name of a university president in Sydney, Australia. On September 13, 2008, she appeared in the Chuseok special program National Baby Face Selection Contest (전국동안선발대회), which aired on Seoul Broadcasting System (SBS), and won the first place. After graduating from Korea University with a master's degree in cultural contents and a Ph.D. in dance studies at Sangmyung University, she worked as a professor of dance at Sangmyung University and served as chairman of the Korea Practical Dance Association, a division under the jurisdiction of the Ministry of Culture, Sports and Tourism.

== Books ==
- Let Me Dance - Belly Dance (나를 춤추게 하다 - 벨리댄스, 2007)
- Content Policy and Applied Humanities (콘텐츠정책과 응용인문학, 2014)

== Awards ==
- 2009 Korea Federation of Arts and Culture Organizations Special Achievement Award
- 2016 Korean Culture and Arts Council Leader Award
- 2016 Seoul Mayor's Commendation
