= Korean Federation of Teachers' Associations =

KFTA
- The Korean Federation of Teachers' Associations; Korean: 한국교원단체총연합회
- Founded: November 23, 1947
- Headquarters: 114, Taebong-ro, Seocho-gu, Seoul, South Korea
- Members: ~120,000
- Key people: Ha Yun-su (37th president)
- Website: kfta.or.kr

The Korean Federation of Teachers' Associations (KFTA, Korean: 한국교원단체총연합회) is the largest and most traditional professional organization and teachers' union in South Korea, with more than 120,000 members. It means 30% of the Korean educators are KFTA's members. The KFTA member is composed of school teachers, college professors, and perspective teachers.
The organization was first launched in 1947 as the Chosun Education Association one year before the establishment of the Korean government. Ever since then, the organization's main objectives are to accomplish quality public education and teacher's professionalism.

== Structure ==
The KFTA has 17 metropolitan and provincial federations of teachers' associations, and 26 functional and affiliated organizations. Ahn Yang-ok is the KFTA's current president. (35th president)

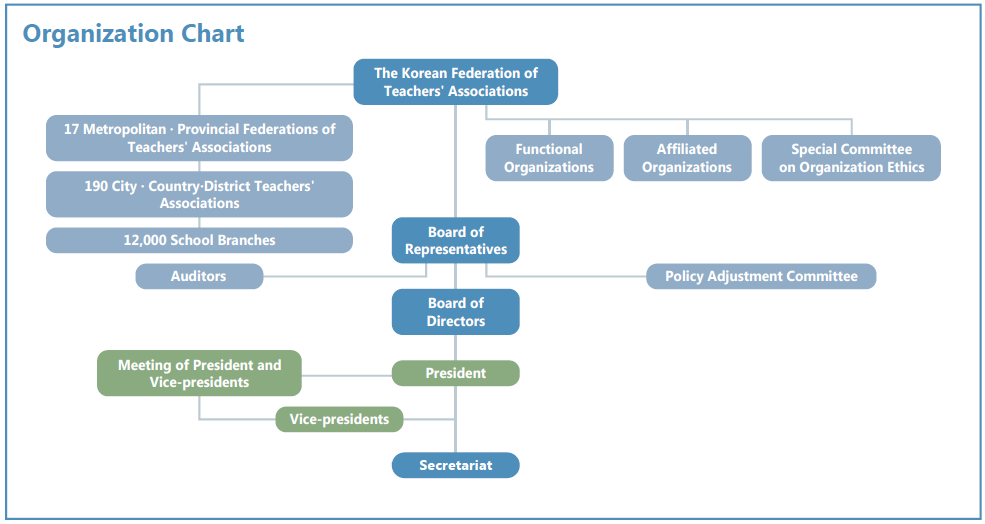

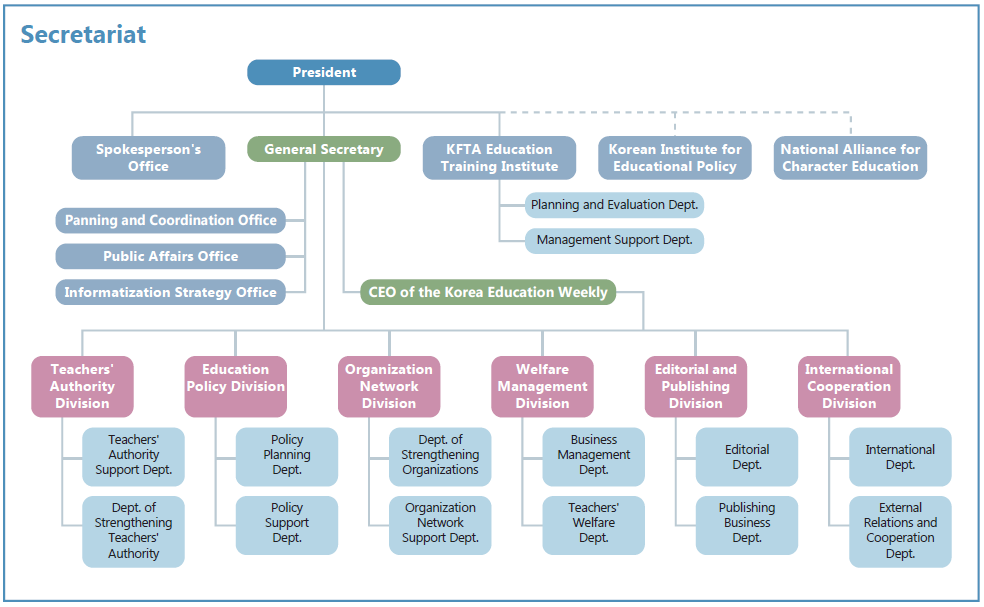

== History ==
1947: Established 'The Chosun Education Association' (Currently, 'the Korean Federation of Teachers' Associations')
1948: 'The Chosun Education Association' renamed as 'the Korean Education Association', published Educational special publication 『New Education』 and 『Vacation Life』
1949: Published Special magazine for elementary education 『New Class』 )
1952: Initiated 'National Education Research Competition', joined in WCOTP(World Confederation of Organization of the Teaching Profession) as founding member)
1953: Established 'The Central Education Research Institute', started 'Commendation Ceremony for Meritorious Teachers' and 'Education Week'
1958: Established 'Professional Ethics for Teachers'
1959: Created 'KFTA Principles'
1961: Founded『Saehan Education Weekly』 (Currently, 『The Korea Education Weekly』)
1966: Held The 15th WCOTP World Conference )
1969: Built 'Manufacturing Facilities for Teaching Aids', launched 'Saehan Scholarship Foundation' (Currently, 'KFTA Scholarship Foundation')
1970: Initiated 'National Education Materials Exhibition'
1971: Established 'Korean Teachers' Mutual Fund'
1982: Created and Declared 'Professional Ethics' and 'Principles for Teachers'
1989: Built New KFTA building (at Woomyon-dong), 'The Korean Education Association' renamed 'the Korean Federation of Teachers' Associations', adopted 'KFTA Principles'
1991: Circulation of 『The Korea Education Weekly』 reached 300,000
1993: Joined EI(Education International) as a founding member
1994: Founded 'Teacher Training Center'
2003: Introduced Direct election for KFTA president, founded 'Online Teacher Training Center', established 'Korea Institute for Educational Policy'
2004: Launched Online newspaper 'Hangyo.Com'
2005: Declared 'Professional Ethics for Teachers'
2007: Established 'Quality Education Quality Policy Forum'
2009: Held ASEAN-Korea Education Leaders' Forum
2010: Declaration of 'Dokdo Day'
2011: Launch of 5-day School Week, Legislation of the Master Teacher System
2012: Launch of Initiative to Promote the Correct Use of Language in Schools, Establishment of National Alliance for Character Education and launch of society-wide character education movement, Launch of the first non-governmental 'KFTA Education Training Institute'
2013: Foundation of 'New Education Reform Forum'
2014: Declared Charter of KFTA

== Activities ==
Solidarity Reinforcement

- From kindergartens to universities the KFTA represents 40% of the educators in Korea as members. The KFTA aims to represent a teacher organization representing all educators in Korea through a national educators' rally, the National Teacher's Day, and supportive programs for incumbent and prospective teachers.

Collective Bargaining with the Government

- The KFTA has collective bargaining with the government twice a year to improve the status of teachers pursuant to 「the Special Act for Improvement and treatment of Teachers' Status」 (May 1991).

Protection of Teachers' Prestige and Authority

- The KFTA recognizes that the protection of educational authority is the basis of all educational activities. The KFTA provides an on/off-line counseling support and the teacher protection-fund in order to establish teachers' authority and professional ethics.

Research and Development on Educational Policy

- The KFTA established a 'Korea Institute for Educational Policy' to make practical education policies which empower public education and improve the professional ability of teachers.

Supportive Programs for Teachers' Professionalism

- The KFTA has contributed to quality education by improving the professional abilities of teachers through various teacher-training programs and educational competitions such as research awards, teaching-material competitions, and so on.

International Exchanges

- The KFTA has promoted various international relations as a founding member of Education International (EI) in 1993. To prepare for the reunification of Korea, the KFTA has a vigorous exchange program with North Korean teacher organizations.

Enhancement of Welfare for Members

- The KFTA provides diverse beneficial services such as credit card, insurance, travel, cultural performance, shopping, medical care, funeral services, etc.

Publications

- The KFTA publishes a newspaper, magazines, and books on education to deliver clear and accurate education knowledge and information.

== Main Achievements ==
1951: Reorganization of school system
1952: Realization of educational autonomy system by city county
1953: Enactment of 「Act on Public Educational Officials」
1954: Enactment of 「Regulation on Remuneration for Public educational Officials」
1964: Realization of educational autonomy system by metropolitan province
1968: Change of the written exam for middle school examination to a lottery system
1973: Shortening of promotion period for teachers and abolishment of limit for teacher's salary system / Enactment of 「Pension for Private School Teachers and Staff Act」
1980: Creation of teaching profession allowance
1981: Enactment of 「Act on Educational Tax」
1982: Re-establishment of 'Teachers' Day', arrangement of a single salary system for elementary and secondary school teachers
1984: Creation of the seniority allowance for teachers
1991: Enactment of 「Special Act for Improvement of Teacher's Status」
1992: Establishment of 「Rules on Negotiation and Consultation for Improvement of Teachers' Status」 / The 1st collective bargaining of KFTA and Education Ministry
1995: Fulfillment of 5% of GDP as education budget
1998: National rally against lowering of retirement age, Donation campaign for child hunger, Collective insurance for KFTA members
2003: Prevention of change of teachers' status into local education officials
2004: Enactment of 「Infant Education Act」
2006: Enactment of 「Act on Preventing and Compensating School Safety Accident」
2008: Opposition to change the title of Ministry("Ministry of the Talented and Science" to "Ministry of Education, Science and Technology"), Realization of supreme court's decision on copyright of school examination
2009: KFTA․ Korean Council for University Education․Ministry of Education, Science and Technology․National Superintendent Council, 'Joint Declaration for Boosting Public Education'
2011: Enactment of Master Teachers' System / Management of 'One School-One Legal Advisor System' / Introduction to liability reparation mutual aid fund to the safe school
2012: Execution of the five-day school week / Establishment of a doctoral program in National Universities of Education
2013: Middle-school teachers' research allowances solved / Submission of bill for Teachers' Authority Protection into the National Assembly / Established and Began operating the Committee for School Teachers' Authority Protection
