= Ahn Sanghak =

South Korean poet (born 1962)

Ahn Sanghak (Korean: 안상학) is a South Korean poet born in 1962. His poetry is based on the philosophy of constant change in life and nature and the harmony and dissonance of yin and yang. He emphasizes the importance of having hope for life through his poetry which is simple but deeply touching. Because of his second poetry collection Andong soju (안동소주), he is known as the "Andong soju poet." He served as the Secretary General of the Writers Association of Korea and the Kwon Jung Saeng Culture Foundation for Children.

== Life ==
Ahn was born in 1962 in Andong, North Gyeongsang Province, South Korea. All the report cards that he received during the six years of elementary school say that he always seemed blue and reticent. His dream at that time was to become a painter. As a teenager, he had a hard time since he and his stepmother did not get along. Then one day, he found an illustrated poem in his room by a high school girl named Ryu Hyang, which impressed him, and he became determined to become a writer. Since then, he began to study Korean national literature and popular literature and worked at an industrial complex in Daegu. After the great demonstration of workers that lasted from July to August, 1987, he focused on writing poetry.

His career as a poet started after the newspaper Joongang Ilbo published his poem "1987년 11월의 신천"; "1987 nyeon 11 worui sincheon"; lit. '"Sincheon in November, 1987"' which depicts a grim landscape of the city in the 1980s. His second poetry collection Andong soju gave him his nickname "Andong soju poet." His other poetry collections include 오래된 엽서; Oraedoen yeopseo; lit. 'Old Postcards', published in 2003, and 아배 생각; Abae saenggak; lit. 'Memories of Father', published in 2008. His children's poetry collection 지구를 운전하는 엄마; Jigureul unjeonhaneun eomma; lit. 'Mom Who Drives the Planet' came out in 2018.

He became the Secretary General of the Writers Association of Korea and took on the memorial project of sorting out the articles left by the deceased children's literature writer Kwon Jung Saeng. He participated in the establishment of the Kwon Jung Saeng Culture Foundation for Children from the spring of 2008, and worked as the foundation's Secretary General over six years until the summer of 2014. He received the Kwon Jung Saeng Writing Fund (Korean: 권정생창작기금) for his poem "그 사람은 돌아오고 나는 거기 없었네"; "Geu sarameun doraogo naneun geogi eobseotne"; lit. '"The Person Came Back and I Wasn't There"'.

== Writing ==
=== Style ===
Ahn's poems do not usually feature a strong-voiced narrator, but they observe the changes in the everyday lives and the times, while emphasizing the importance of having hope for life. He mostly writes simple and easy poems, but they are very moving especially because he restrains from exhibiting his emotions too overtly.

Some of his poems depict his longing for the sister who died young of cancer and for those who are gone now, while others talk about the pains of the contemporary people. Also described are his grandmother who longs for her hometown, the poet himself who is missing something like his grandmother, and his consolations for the every living being in the world. With such compassion he ultimately pursues love, which is 'the desire to communicate,' by sublimating the pains of the contemporary people into humor and jokes. His poetry was acclaimed for its standout delineation of humanity and benevolence carried out in such a sincere manner, without any fancy expressions or rhetoric.

=== Major works ===
The characters who appear often in his poetry are poor, but they conform to their reality without any resistance and are sacrificed: for example, "실내포장 아줌마"; Silnae pojang ajumma; lit. '"Lady at the Cart Bar"', in which the lady tells the story of her life as it is, and "납뜰 고모"; "Napddeul gomo"; lit. '"Aunt in Napddeul"', as well as "돼지 아비"; "Dwoeji abi"; lit. '"Pig Father"' that show fatalism. Many of his poems are set in his hometown, Andong, like the poetry collection Andong soju.

In his third poetry collection Oraedoen yeopseo, poems including "거문도에서 한 사흘"; "Geomundo-eseo han saheul"; lit. '"About Three Days in Geomun-do Island"', "등대를 닮은 아이"; "Deungdaereul darmeun a-i"; lit. '"Child Who Looks Like a Lighthouse"', are set in isolated places like an island. The poet also describes a person who cannot stay, captured by wanderlust, through the poems like "산길"; "Sangil"; lit. '"Mountain Roads"', and "江"; "Gang"; lit. '"River"'. However, "해꽃"; "Haekkot"; lit. '"Sunglow"', and "낙동강"; "Nakdonggang"; lit. '"The Nakdonggang River"', narrate the possibility of finding a way of life by going back home to the countryside. In poems like "삼밭골 마씨"; "Sambatgol massi"; lit. '"Mr. Ma of Sambatgol Village"' and "토갓마을 이씨 가로되"; "Togatmaeul issi garodoe"; lit. '"Mr. Lee of Togatmaeul Village Says"', the farmer who has come back home depicts what it is like to live in the rural area of Andong, in a vivid colloquial style.

Abae saenggak, his forth poetry collection, mostly deals with sympathy and longing. In the poem "한식"; "Hansik"; lit. '"Korean Meal"', the jokes thrown by farmers when they are tired from planting rice represent the virtue of caring and respecting the living things, which lets the readers know how people of the countryside live as a harmonious community. Poems including "Abae saenggak" and "아버지의 검지"; "Abeojiui geomji"; lit. '"Father's Index Finger"' show how much he misses his father, and creates a warm and humble mood by depicting the friendliness of his father who never forgets to smile.

== Works ==
=== Poetry collections ===
《그대 무사한가》, 한길사, 1991 / Geudae musahanga (Are You Safe and Sound), Hangilsa, 1991

《안동소주》, 실천문학사, 1999 / Andong soju (Andong Soju), Silcheon Munhaksa, 1999

《오래된 엽서》, 천년의시작, 2003 / Oraedoen yeopseo (Old Postcards), Cheonnyeonui Sijak, 2003

《아배 생각》, 애지, 2008 / Abae saenggak (Memories of Father), Aeji, 2008

《그 사람은 돌아오고 나는 거기 없었네》, 실천문학사, 2017 / Geu sarameun doraogo naneun geogi eobseotne (The Person Came Back and I Wasn't There), Silcheon Munhaksa, 2017

=== Children's poetry collection ===
《지구를 운전하는 엄마》, 창비, 2018 / Jigureul unjeonhaneun eomma (Mom Who Drives the Planet), Changbi, 2018

=== Illustrated poetry collection ===
《시의 꽃말을 읽다》, 실천문학사, 2015 / Si-ui kkotmareul irkda (Reading the Language of Flowers from Poetry), Silcheon Munhaksa, 2015

=== Biography ===
《권종대》, 민주화운동기념사업회, 2004 / Gwon Jong-dae, Korea Democracy Foundation, 2004

== Awards ==
Gosan Literature Award Grand Prize (고산문학대상, 2015)

Kwon Jung Saeng Writing Fund (권정생창작기금, 2016)

Dongsi Majung Literary Work Award (동시마중작품상, 2018)
