= Eup =

Eup or EUP may refer to:

== Places ==
- Eup (administrative division), a level of administrative division found in North Korea and South Korea
- Eup, Haute-Garonne, a commune in France
- Eastern Upper Peninsula of Michigan

== Government and politics ==
- Economic Union Party, a former political party in the Dominion of Newfoundland
- European Union Parliament, now known as European Parliament
- Europe United Party, a pan-European federal political party
- European Union Politics, a scholarly journal

== University presses ==
- Edinburgh University Press, in Scotland
- Ewha Womans University Press, in Seoul, South Korea

== Other uses ==
- Edmonds Underwater Park, a scuba diving site in Seattle, Washington
- Enterprise Unified Process, a software development process
- Energy-using products, the predecessor of Energy-related products
- Extrauterine pregnancy, an alternative term for ectopic pregnancy
