= Yi Yuksa =

Korean poet and activist (1904–1944)

Yi Wŏllok
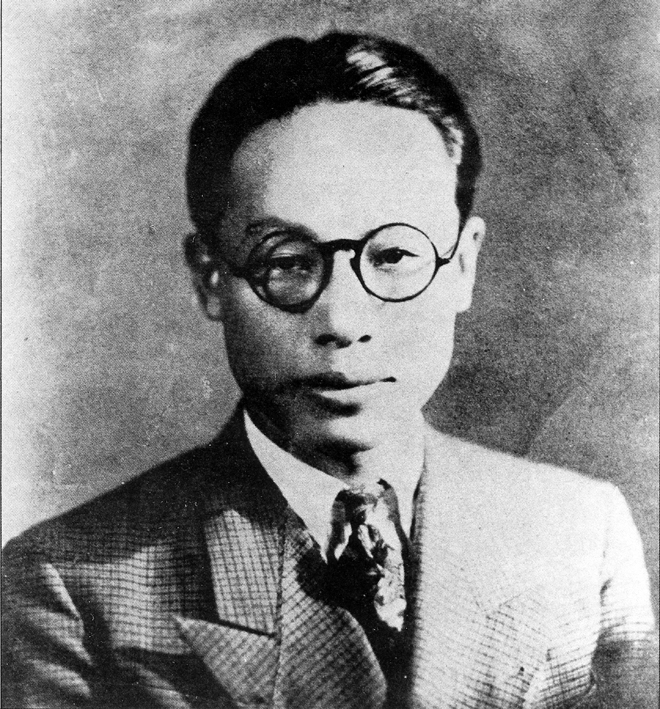
- Born: May 18, 1904; Andong, Gyeongsangbuk-do, Korean Empire
- Died: January 16, 1944 (aged 39); Beijing, China
- Resting place: Andong, South Korea
- Occupation: Writer
- Spouse: An Iryang (안일양)
- Children: Yi Okbi (이옥비), Yi Tongbak (이동박)
- Writing career
- Pen name: Yi Yuk-sa
- Language: Korean
- Period: 1930-44
- Genre: Poetry
- Literary movement: Korean independence

- Korean name
- Hangul: 이원록
- Hanja: 李源祿
- RR: I Wonrok
- MR: I Wŏllok

Art name
- Hangul: 이육사
- Hanja: 李陸史
- RR: I Yuksa
- MR: I Yuksa

Childhood name
- Hangul: 이원삼
- Hanja: 李源三
- RR: I Wonsam
- MR: I Wŏnsam

Yi Wŏllok (Korean: 이원록; Hanja: 李源祿; May 18, 1904 – January 16, 1944), better known by his art name Yi Yuksa (이육사; 李陸史), was a Korean poet and independence activist. As one of his country's most famous poets, he and his works symbolize the spirit of the anti-Japanese resistance of the 1930s and 1940s.

== Life ==
Yi was born in Dosan-myeon, Andong on May 18, 1904. Yi was a descendant of the scholar Yi Hwang, better known as Toegye. Yi completed his basic education in Andong, graduating at the age of 15 in 1919.

In 1920, at age 17, he moved with his family to Daegu and married. Yi became a teacher at the academy at which he studied, but in 1924 left for Japan to study at university.

In 1925, Yi returned to Daegu. Along with his brothers, he joined the Heroic Corps, an association formed in response to Japanese repression of the Korean independence movement. The Heroic Corps was associated with acts of sabotage and assassination. That same year or in 1926, Yi moved to Beijing, likely because of this association, and studied at Sun Yat-sen University in Guangzhou. Yi returned to Korea in 1927. When members of the association bombed the Daegu branch of the Bank of Chosēn, Yi was among the arrested and spent 18 months in prison. There he was given the number 264 ('Yi Yuk-sa' in Korean) which he adopted afterwards as his pen name.

In 1929, Yi began to work as a journalist, and in 1930 he published his first poem. "Horse", in The Chosun Ilbo. From 1931 to 1933, he studied in China, but continued to maintain contacts with the Korean resistance. In 1935, he began to concentrate on his writing, publishing both poems and critical essays. Accounts have Yi being arrested a total of 17 times.

== Death ==
In April 1943, he went to Beijing and apparently began smuggling weapons into Korea. That same year, Yi returned to Korea on the first anniversary of the death of his mother. He was arrested in Korea, and transferred to Beijing, where he died in prison on January 16, 1944, at the age of 39. Controversy lingered after Yi's death, and there are allegations from eyewitnesses that suggest Yi was subject to live experimentation, which was common practice in Japanese prisons during the period. It is reported Yi's bloodstream was injected with saline solution in the prison hospital - which subsequently killed him. He was cremated and buried in Miari, Seoul.

In 1960, Yi's remains were reinterred near his birthplace and in 1968 a memorial stone was erected in Andong. Just outside Andong there is the Yi Yuksa Museum, dedicated to the memory of his literature and freedom-fighting.

== Work ==
While Yi only wrote approximately forty poems, the fact that they represent the resistance spirit of the Korean people against the Japanese colonial government has made his work famous in Korea. In 1939, Yi published his most famous poem, "Green Grapes". Yi strove to write in the tradition of Korean lyric poetry, among other things writing in Hangul at a time during which this was banned by the Japanese government. Because of Japanese censorship, his writing had to employ symbol and metaphor, never directly commenting on Japanese colonialism or the issues that surrounded it. Nevertheless, his meaning was clear to Koreans, and because of this and his lyricism, his work continues to be included in school textbooks in Korea.

"The Wide Plain" is perhaps the clearest example of Yi's ability to combine lyricism with anti-colonial sentiment:

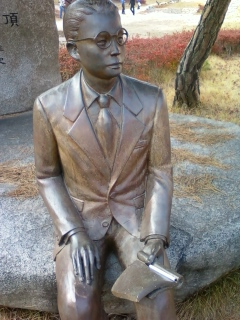
Statue at the Yi Yuksa Museum

On a distant day,
When heaven first opened,
Somewhere a cock must have crowed.

No mountain ranges,
Rushing to the desired sea,
Could have dared to invade this land.

While the busy seasons gust and fade,
With endless time,
A great river first opens the way.

Now snow falls,
The fragrance of plum blossoms is far off,
I’ll sow the seed of my sad song here.

When a superman comes
On a white horse down the myriad years,
Let him sing aloud my song on the wide plain.

After Yi's death on January 16, 1946, his brother published some 20 of his poems. A second edition followed in 1956, and in 1974 an authoritative edition.

== Poems in English ==
- The Wind and the Waves: Four Modern Korean Poets (ed. Lee Sung-Il), Asian Humanities Press 1989, p.2ff, name transliterated as Yi-Yook-sa
- "The Summit" / "Deep-Purple Grapes" / "The Lake" / "The Wide Plain" / "Flower" / "A Tall Tree" in Modern Korean literature: an anthology (ed. Peter H. Lee), University of Hawaii 1990, pp.75-9
- "Twilight" / "The Grapes" / "The Vertex" / "Wilderness" / "Flowers", in Modern Korean Poetry (ed. Jaihiun Kim), Jain Publishing Company, 1994, pp.57-9
- "Twilight" / "Thatched House" / "A Small Park" / "The Summit"/ "Blue Grapes", in The Columbia Anthology of Modern Korean Poetry (ed. David McCann), Columbia University 2004, pp.37-40

== See also ==
- Korea under Japanese rule
- List of Korean-language poets
