= Ahn Yang-ok =

South Korean academic (born 1957)

- 안양옥
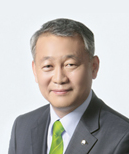
- Ahn Yang-ok
- Education: Seoul National University
- Occupation: Professor at Seoul National University of Education
- Title: President, The Korean Federation of Teachers' Associations

Ahn Yang-ok (Korean: 안양옥; born 7 April 1957) is an educator and the 35th president of The Korean Federation of Teachers' Associations. Ahn is also a member of EIAP regional committee.

== Education ==
He received B.A. degree in Physical Education from Seoul National University, followed by M.A, and Ph.D. degrees in physical education from the same university. ,

== Teaching ==
=== 1981–1985 ===
Teacher

- Secho Middle SchoolSeoul
- Donjak Middle School
- Sudo Girls’ High School

=== 1988–1998 ===
Instructor

- Seoul National University
- Dankook University
- Dong-duk Women’s University
- Yong-In University
- Korean National Sport University

=== 2001~Present ===
Professor

- Seoul National University of Education

== Career ==
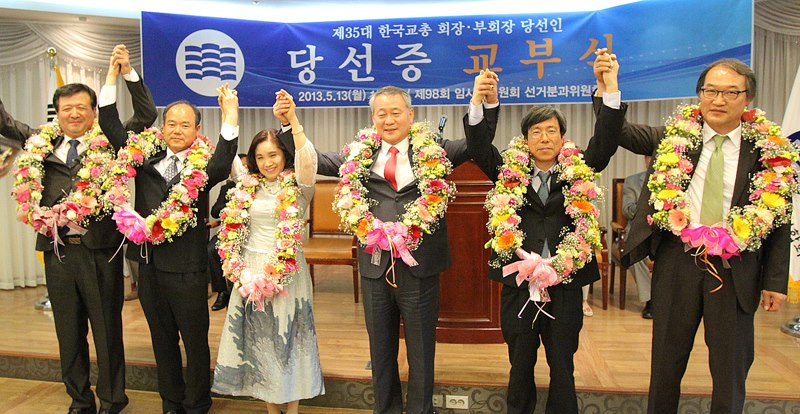
President of the Korean Federation of Teachers' Associations

- President, Directors’ Council of Students’ Affairs, Korean National Council for University of Education (2003–2005)
- Vice president, The Seoul Federation of Teachers’ Association (2005–2007)
- President, The Seoul Federation of Teachers’ Association (2007–2008)
- Chairperson, Sangmoon High School, Seoul, Republic of Korea (2008–2010)
- President, Korean Society of Sport Policy (2009–2011)
- Committee member, Education International Asia-Pacific Regional Committee (2013~Present)
- Commissioner, Council for Seoul Public Order (2010~Present)
- President, The Korean Federation of Teachers’ Association (2010~Present)

== Awards ==
Presidential Awards of Korean Sports, Ministry of Culture, Sports and Tourism (October 14, 2011)

- Winner of the Physical Education Research Awards at the Korea Sports Awards

Mayor Awards of Culture for Seoul City, Seoul City Hall (December 2, 2011)

- Winner of Seoul Culture Awards

Physical Education Research Awards, Korean Olympic Torch Association (December 7, 2010)

- Winner of Research Awards, Korean Olympic Torch Association

Excellence in Field of Physical Education Research, Korean Olympic Committee (February 9, 2010)

- Winner of awards for Excellence Research, Korean Olympic Committee
