= Sosu Seowon =

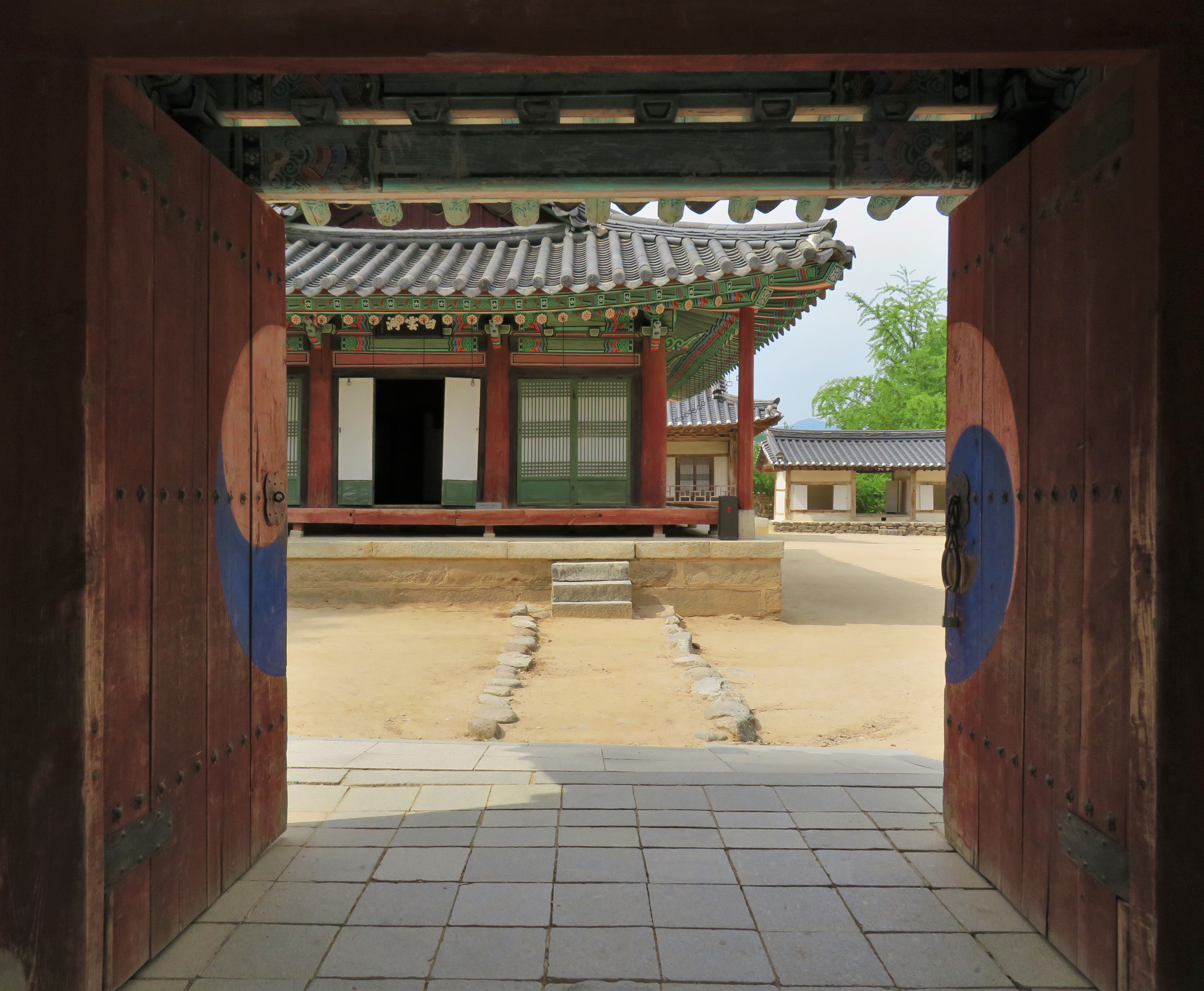
- Part of the academy complex (2016)
- Interactive map of Sosu Seowon
- Location: South Korea
- Coordinates: 36°55′32″N 128°34′48″E
- Area: 17.16 ha (42.4 acres)

UNESCO World Heritage Site
- Criteria: iii
- Designated: 2019
- Part of: Seowon, Korean Neo-Confucian Academies
- Reference no.: 1498-001

Historic Sites of South Korea
- Official name: Sosuseowon Confucian Academy, Yeongju
- Designated: 1963-01-21
- Reference no.: 55

Korean name
- Hangul: 소수서원
- Hanja: 紹修書院
- RR: Sosu seowon
- MR: Sosu sŏwŏn

Sosu Seowon (Korean: 소수서원; Hanja: 紹修書院) is a Joseon-era seowon (private Neo-Confucian academy), now located in Sunheung-myeon, Yeongju, South Korea. It is the oldest extant seowon in Korea. It was founded by Chu Sebung (1495–1554), then the magistrate of Pungseong County.

Sosu Seowon was one of 47 seowons that survived from the Seowon Abolishment by Heungseon Daewongun Regent in 1871.

== History ==
During the Joseon period in 1542, the magistrate of Punggi County Chu Sebung established this seowon, which was initially called "Baegundong Seowon" (백운동서원; 白雲洞書院). It was renamed to "Sosu Seowon" in 1550. That year, Yi Hwang established Sosu Seowon as the first legislated private institute of Korea.

During the Joseon era (1392–1910), Korean Buddhism suffered heavy persecution. Many temples were closed and the buildings repurposed. Sosu Seowon originally had been a Buddhist temple and then became a private academy.

== Description ==
On the right of the Sosu Seowon entrance is the Okgyesu, a stream of the Nakdong River coming from Mt. Sobaek. Inside Sosu Seowon's auditorium is a 'Sosu Seowon' sign engraved by King Myeongjong. Behind the auditorium there are Jikbangjae, Ilshinjae, Hakgujae and Jirakjae. On the east side are the Seogo, the portrait of Anhyang (National Treasure No.111) painted at the end of Goryeo Dynasty, and the Munseong Tomb where the Daesungjisung King Munseon's Jeonjwado (National Treasure No.485) is enshrined.

== Gallery ==
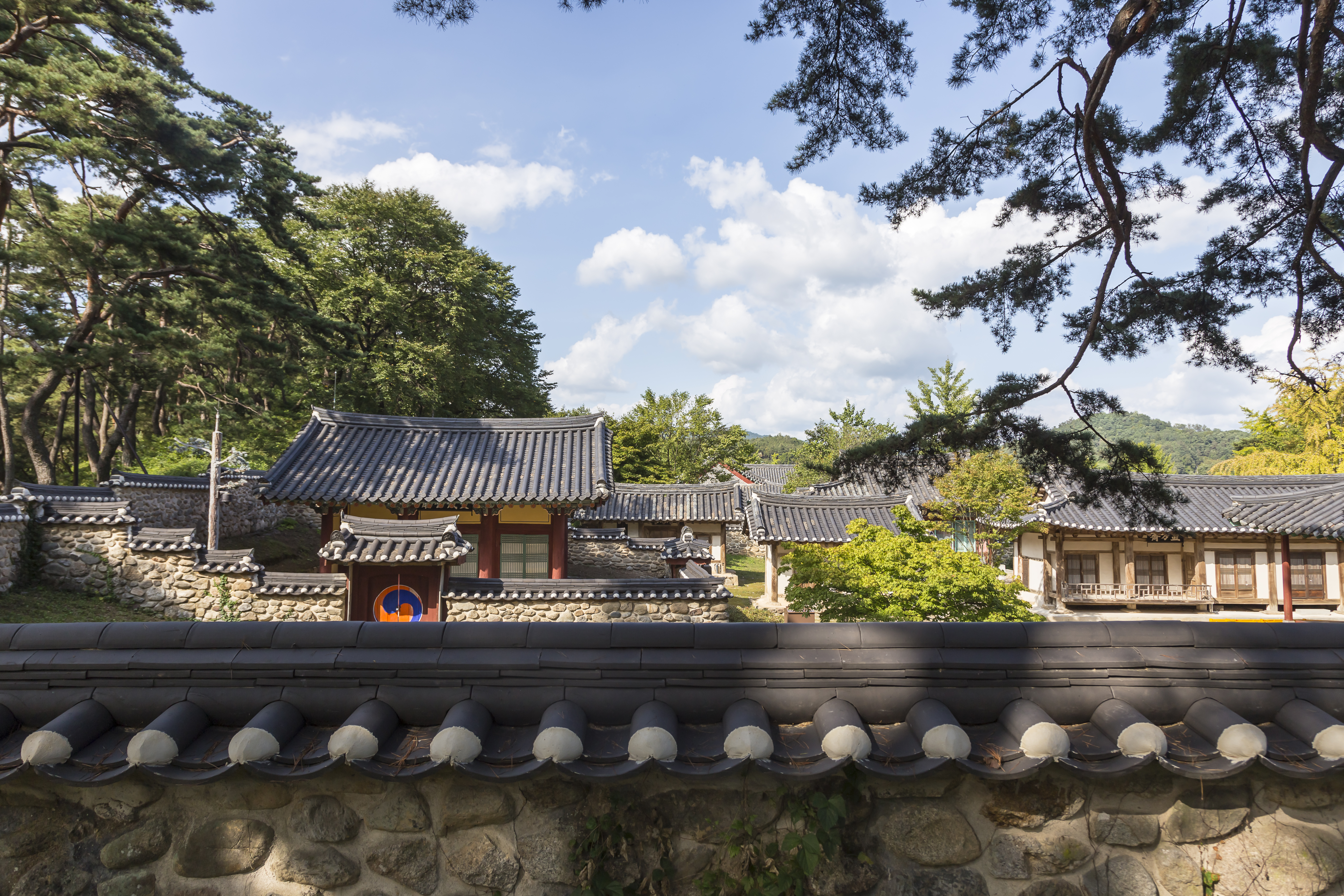
Part of the complex (2014)

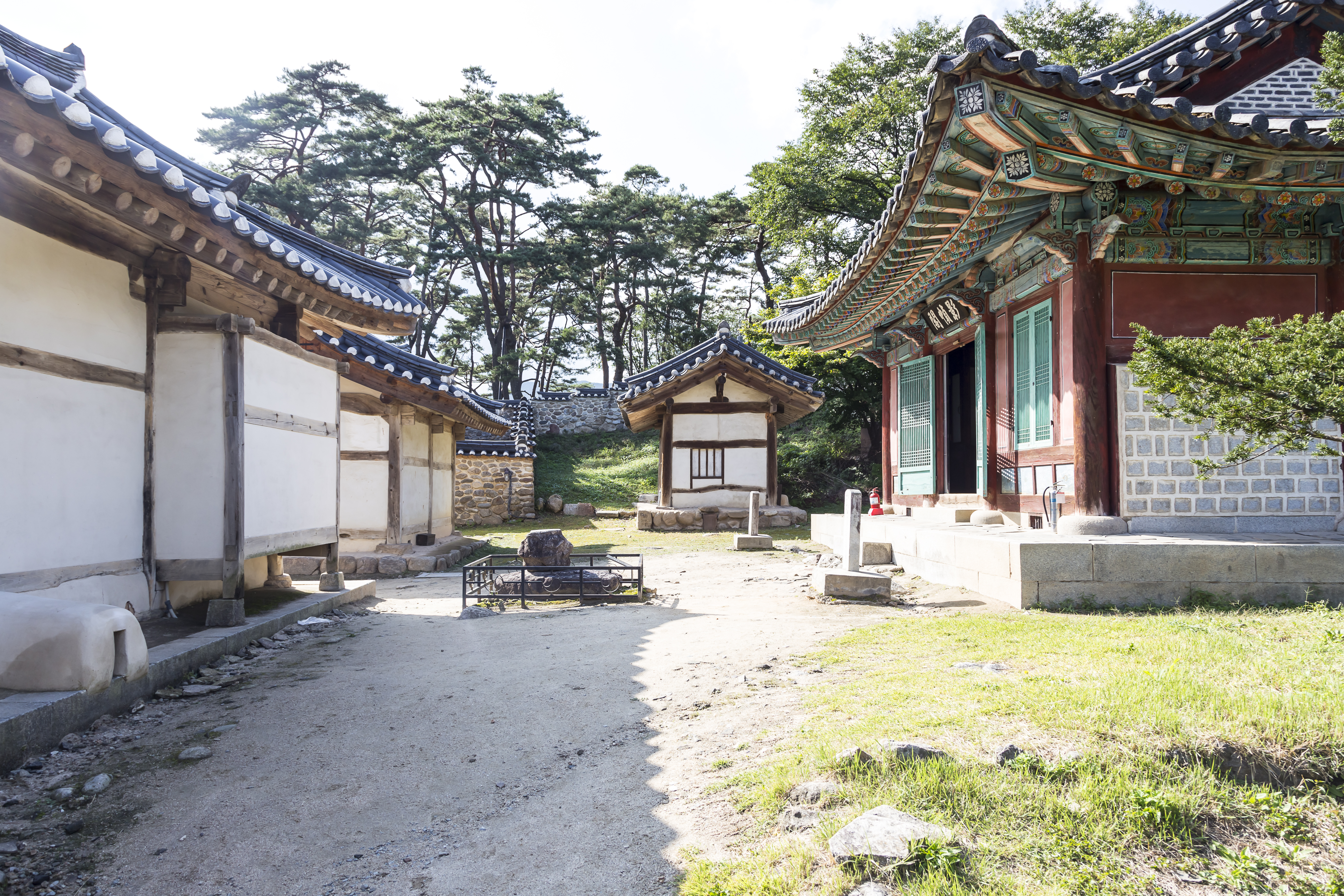
Part of the complex (2014)

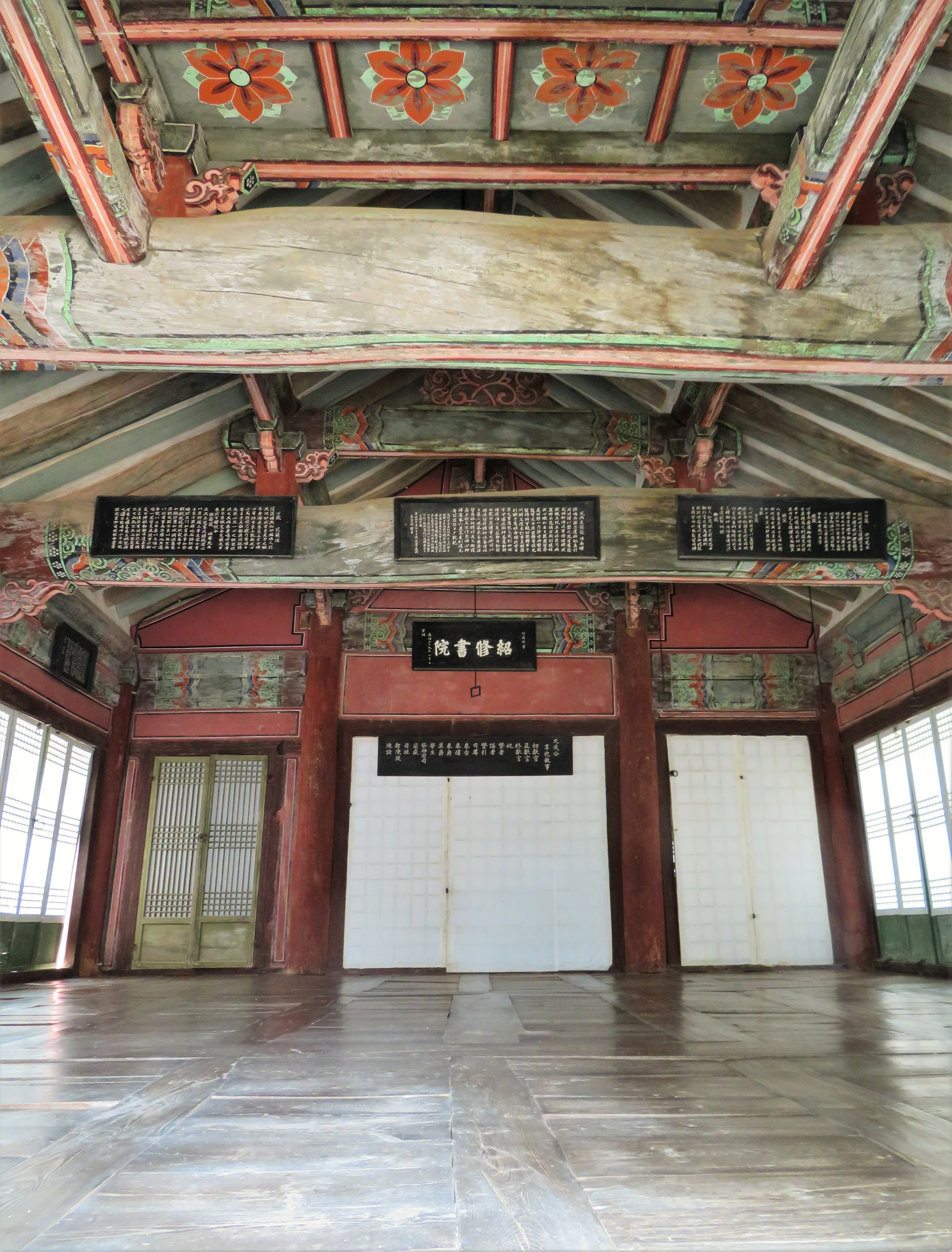
Interior of one of the buildings (2016)
