= Yeongju =

City in North Gyeongsang, South Korea

Coordinates: 36°48′21″N 128°37′26″E

- Municipal City
- Panoramic view of Yeongju

- Flag Emblem of Yeongju

- Location in South Korea
- Country: South Korea
- Region: Yeongnam
- Administrative divisions: 1 eup, 9 myeon, 9 dong

Area
  - Total: 668.45 km^{2} (258.09 sq mi)

Population (August 2025)
  - Total: 97,706
  - Density: 293.2/km^{2} (759/sq mi)
  - Dialect: Gyeongsang

Korean name
- Hangul: 영주시
- Hanja: 榮州市
- RR: Yeongju-si
- MR: Yŏngju-si

Yeongju (Korean: 영주; Korean pronunciation: [jʌŋ.dʑu]) is a city in North Gyeongsang Province, South Korea. It has an area of 668.84 square kilometres (258.24 sq mi) and a population of 113,930 people according to the 2008 census. The city borders Bonghwa county to the east, Danyang County of North Chungcheong Province to the west, Andong and Yecheon county to the south, and Yeongwol County of Gangwon Province to the north.

Buseoksa Temple in Yeongju is outstanding as a representative temple of the Avatamsaka Sect of Silla Buddhism. Sosu Seowon is the first Seowon (Confucian academy) to have had national financial support by way of tax exemptions.

Yeongju is also home to a large Novelis Aluminum plant, employing approximately 1000 workers. This plant provides flat-rolled aluminum sheet products to customers throughout Asia.

The city is an agricultural hub, particularly known for its apples and ginseng.

== Administrative divisions ==
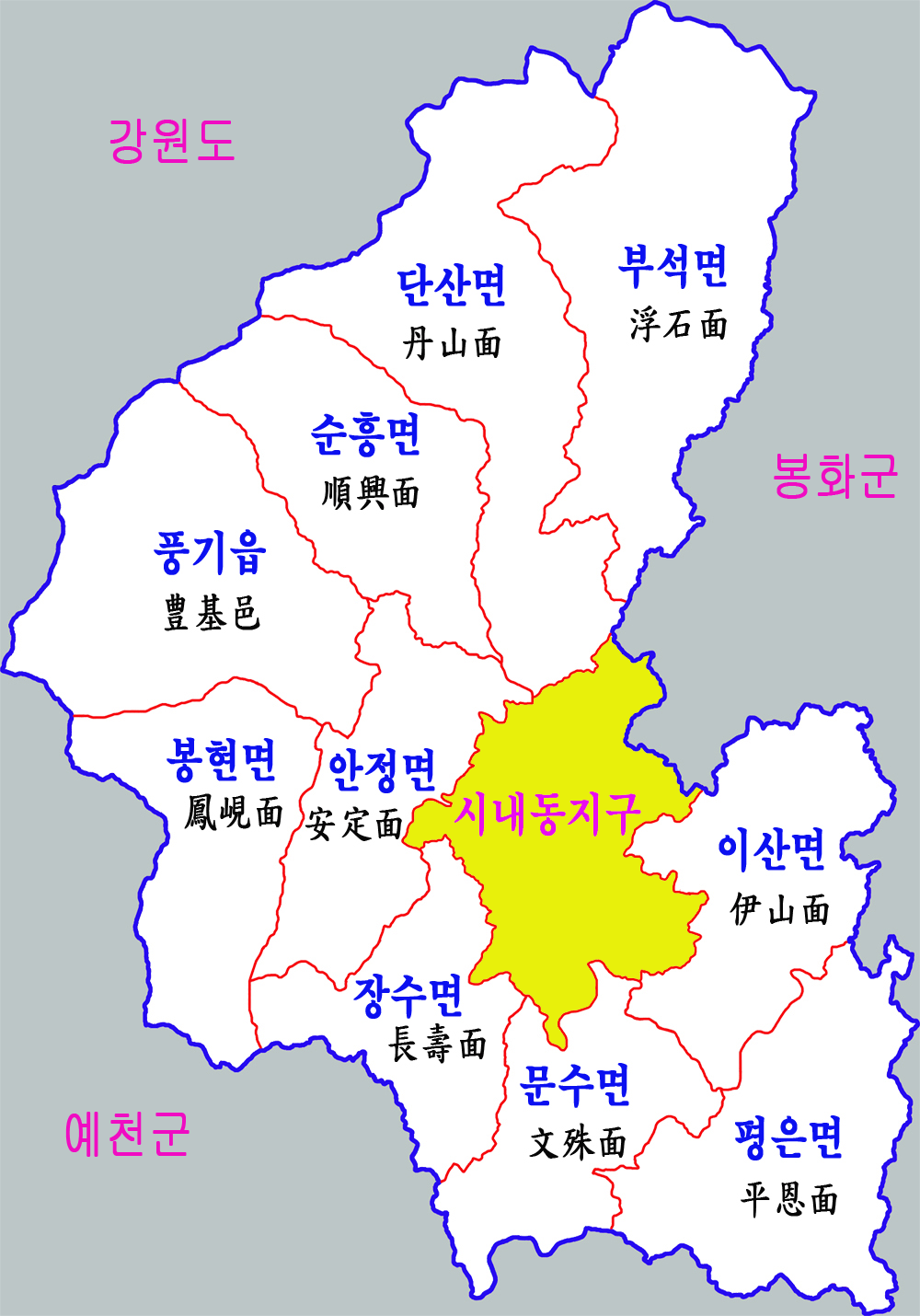
Map of Yeongju eup/myeon/dong in Korean.

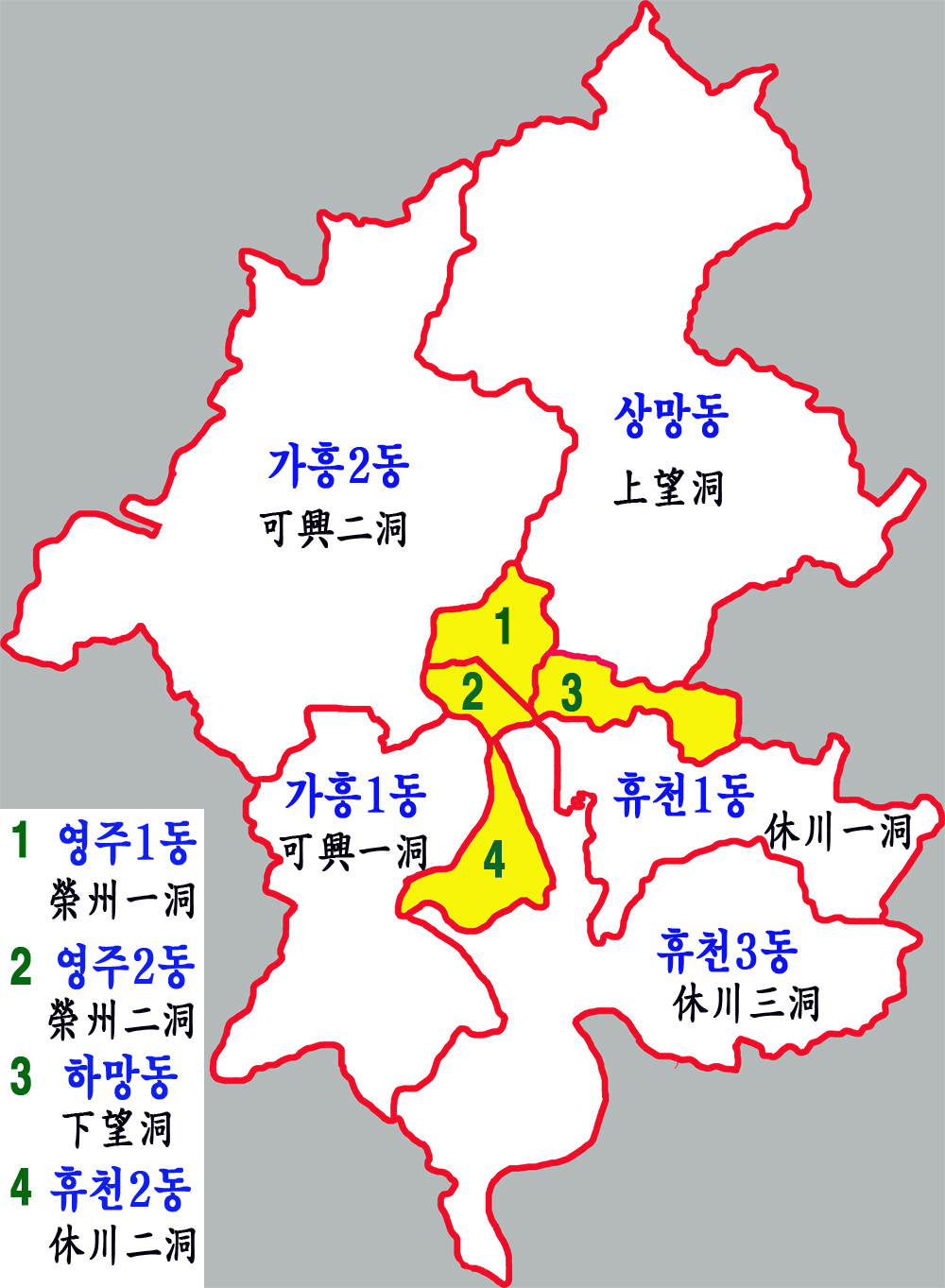
Inset map

Yeongju is divided into nineteen primary divisions: one eup (읍) or town, nine myeon (면) or township, and nine dong (동).

eup/myeon/dong	Hangeul	Hanja
Punggi-eup	풍기읍	豊基邑
Buseok-myeon	부석면	浮石面
Munsu-myeon	문수면	文殊面
Pyeongeun-myeon	평은면	平恩面
Isan-myeon	이산면	伊山面
Bongheon-myeon	봉현면	鳳峴面
Sunheung-myeon	순흥면	順興面
Jangsu-myeon	장수면	長壽面
Anjeong-myeon	안정면	安定面
Dansan-myeon	단산면	丹山面
Yeongju-1-dong	영주1동	榮州一洞
Yeongju-2-dong	영주2동	榮州二洞
Gaheung-1-dong	가흥1동	可興一洞
Gaheung-2-dong	가흥2동	可興二洞
Hyucheon-1-dong	휴천1동	休川一洞
Hyucheon-2-dong	휴천2동	休川二洞
Hyucheon-3-dong	휴천3동	休川三洞
Sangmang-dong	상망동	上望洞
Hamang-dong	하망동	下望洞

The eup and myeon are further divided into numerous ri (리) or village.

eup/myeon/dong	ri	Hangeul	Hanja
Punggi-eup	Seongnae-ri	성내리	城內里
Punggi-eup	Dongbu-ri	동부리	東部里
Punggi-eup	Sanbeop-ri	산법리	山法里
Punggi-eup	Migok-ri	미곡리	味谷里
Punggi-eup	Samga-ri	삼가리	三街里
Punggi-eup	Ukgeum-ri	욱금리	郁錦里
Punggi-eup	Geumgye-ri	금계리	金鷄里
Punggi-eup	Gyochon-ri	교촌리	校村里
Punggi-eup	Seobu-ri	서부리	西部里
Punggi-eup	Baek-ri	백리	白里
Punggi-eup	Baeksin-ri	백신리	白新里
Punggi-eup	Changrak-ri	창락리	昌樂里
Punggi-eup	Sucheol-ri	수철리	水鐵里
Punggi-eup	Jeongu-ri	전구리	前邱里
Buseok-myeon	Namdae-ri	남대리	南大里
Buseok-myeon	Bukji-ri	북지리	北枝里
Buseok-myeon	Imgok-ri	임곡리	林谷里
Buseok-myeon	Socheon-ri	소천리	韶川里
Buseok-myeon	Nogok-ri	노곡리	魯谷里
Buseok-myeon	Yongam-ri	용암리	龍岩里
Buseok-myeon	Ugok-ri	우곡리	愚谷里
Buseok-myeon	Sangseok-ri	상석리	上石里
Buseok-myeon	Gamgok-ri	감곡리	甘谷里
Buseok-myeon	Bogye-ri	보계리	寶溪里
Munsu-myeon	Seungmun-ri	승문리	繩門里
Munsu-myeon	Manbang-ri	만방리	萬芳里
Munsu-myeon	Jeokdong-ri	적동리	赤東里
Munsu-myeon	Gwonseon-ri	권선리	權先里
Munsu-myeon	Wolho-ri	월호리	月呼里
Munsu-myeon	Beolsa-ri	벌사리	伐賜里
Munsu-myeon	Tansan-ri	탄산리	炭山里
Munsu-myeon	Sudo-ri	수도리	水島里
Munsu-myeon	Joje-ri	조제리	助梯里
Pyeongeun-myeon	Pyeongeun-ri	평은리	平恩里
Pyeongeun-myeon	Gangdong-ri	강동리	江東里
Pyeongeun-myeon	Jigok-ri	지곡리	芝谷里
Pyeongeun-myeon	Oun-ri	오운리	梧云里
Pyeongeun-myeon	Cheonbon-ri	천본리	川本里
Pyeongeun-myeon	Geumgwang-ri	금광리	金光里
Pyeongeun-myeon	Yongheol-ri	용혈리	龍穴里
Isan-myeon	Won-ri	원리	院里
Isan-myeon	Sinam-ri	신암리	新岩里
Isan-myeon	Jidong-ri	지동리	池洞里
Isan-myeon	Seokpo-ri	석포리	石浦里
Isan-myeon	Yongsang-ri	용상리	龍上里
Isan-myeon	Sincheon-ri	신천리	新川里
Isan-myeon	Unmun-ri	운문리	雲文里
Isan-myeon	Duwol-ri	두월리	斗月里
Isan-myeon	Naerim-ri	내림리	內林里
Bongheon-myeon	Dusan-ri	두산리	斗山里
Bongheon-myeon	Ohyeon-ri	오현리	梧峴里
Bongheon-myeon	Daechon-ri	대촌리	大村里
Bongheon-myeon	Hancheon-ri	한천리	寒泉里
Bongheon-myeon	Yujeon-ri	유전리	柳田里
Bongheon-myeon	Nojwa-ri	노좌리	魯佐里
Bongheon-myeon	Hachon-ri	하촌리	下村里
Sunheung-myeon	Taejang-ri	태장리	台庄里
Sunheung-myeon	Jidong-ri	지동리	池洞里
Sunheung-myeon	Seokgyo-ri	석교리	石橋里
Sunheung-myeon	Eupnae-ri	읍내리	邑內里
Sunheung-myeon	Naejuk-ri	내죽리	內竹里
Sunheung-myeon	Cheonggu-ri	청구리	靑邱里
Sunheung-myeon	Baejeom-ri	배점리	裵店里
Sunheung-myeon	Deokhyeon-ri	덕현리	德峴里
Jangsu-myeon	Bangu-ri	반구리	盤邱里
Jangsu-myeon	Dujeon-ri	두전리	豆田里
Jangsu-myeon	Galsan-ri	갈산리	葛山里
Jangsu-myeon	Paji-ri	파지리	芭芝里
Jangsu-myeon	Seonggok-ri	성곡리	星谷里
Jangsu-myeon	Hwagi-ri	화기리	花岐里
Jangsu-myeon	Soryong-ri	소룡리	小龍里
Jangsu-myeon	Homun-ri	호문리	好文里
Anjeong-myeon	Sinjeon-ri	신전리	新田里
Anjeong-myeon	Saenghyeon-ri	생현리	生峴里
Anjeong-myeon	Bongam-ri	봉암리	鳳岩里
Anjeong-myeon	Yongsan-ri	용산리	龍山里
Anjeong-myeon	Yeoreuk-ri	여륵리	汝勒里
Anjeong-myeon	Muk-ri	묵리	墨里
Anjeong-myeon	Naejul-ri	내줄리	內茁里
Anjeong-myeon	Irwon-ri	일원리	逸園里
Anjeong-myeon	Ansim-ri	안심리	安心里
Anjeong-myeon	Ongam-ri	옹암리	瓮岩里
Anjeong-myeon	Danchon-ri	단촌리	丹村里
Anjeong-myeon	Daepyeong-ri	대평리	大坪里
Anjeong-myeon	Ogye-ri	오계리	梧溪里
Dansan-myeon	Dongwon-ri	동원리	東元里
Dansan-myeon	Sacheon-ri	사천리	沙川里
Dansan-myeon	Gugu-ri	구구리	九邱里
Dansan-myeon	Byeongsan-ri	병산리	屛山里
Dansan-myeon	Okdae-ri	옥대리	玉帶里
Dansan-myeon	Dangok-ri	단곡리	丹谷里
Dansan-myeon	Jwaseok-ri	좌석리	坐石里
Dansan-myeon	Marak-ri	마락리	馬落里

== Transportation ==
Yeongju connected by highway with these routes:

- Jungang Expressway to Busan, Daegu
- National Route 5
- National Route 28 to Yeongcheon, Gyeongju, Pohang
- National Route 36 to Boryeong, Gongju, Sejong, Cheongju, Chungju, Jecheon

Rail service to Yeongju Station is also available, and is located on the Jungang Line, the Yeongdong Line and the Gyeongbuk Line.

== Climate ==
Yeongju has a humid continental climate (Köppen: Dwa), but can be considered a borderline humid subtropical climate (Köppen: Cwa) using the −3 °C (27 °F) isotherm.

Climate data for Yeongju (1991–2020 normals, extremes 1972–present)
Month	Jan	Feb	Mar	Apr	May	Jun	Jul	Aug	Sep	Oct	Nov	Dec	Year
Record high °C (°F)	13.6 (56.5)	21.6 (70.9)	25.2 (77.4)	32.0 (89.6)	35.2 (95.4)	35.5 (95.9)	37.5 (99.5)	38.0 (100.4)	33.8 (92.8)	30.0 (86.0)	24.5 (76.1)	16.0 (60.8)	38.0 (100.4)
Mean daily maximum °C (°F)	2.7 (36.9)	5.8 (42.4)	11.5 (52.7)	18.6 (65.5)	23.9 (75.0)	27.4 (81.3)	28.9 (84.0)	29.6 (85.3)	25.5 (77.9)	20.0 (68.0)	12.2 (54.0)	4.8 (40.6)	17.6 (63.7)
Daily mean °C (°F)	−2.2 (28.0)	0.2 (32.4)	5.4 (41.7)	11.8 (53.2)	17.2 (63.0)	21.3 (70.3)	24.0 (75.2)	24.2 (75.6)	19.3 (66.7)	12.9 (55.2)	6.1 (43.0)	−0.4 (31.3)	11.7 (53.1)
Mean daily minimum °C (°F)	−7.3 (18.9)	−5.4 (22.3)	−0.6 (30.9)	4.8 (40.6)	10.5 (50.9)	15.8 (60.4)	20.1 (68.2)	20.2 (68.4)	14.2 (57.6)	6.7 (44.1)	0.4 (32.7)	−5.4 (22.3)	6.2 (43.2)
Record low °C (°F)	−23.8 (−10.8)	−20.7 (−5.3)	−12.0 (10.4)	−5.8 (21.6)	1.2 (34.2)	5.1 (41.2)	10.8 (51.4)	9.6 (49.3)	2.0 (35.6)	−6.9 (19.6)	−11.5 (11.3)	−20.0 (−4.0)	−23.8 (−10.8)
Average precipitation mm (inches)	18.4 (0.72)	30.2 (1.19)	53.3 (2.10)	94.8 (3.73)	118.5 (4.67)	158.5 (6.24)	298.8 (11.76)	283.7 (11.17)	154.1 (6.07)	58.2 (2.29)	42.2 (1.66)	23.3 (0.92)	1,334 (52.52)
Average precipitation days (≥ 0.1 mm)	5.0	5.1	7.8	8.5	8.4	9.6	15.8	15.0	9.9	5.7	7.1	5.5	103.4
Average snowy days	5.8	5.7	2.8	0.4	0.0	0.0	0.0	0.0	0.0	0.1	1.4	4.6	20.7
Average relative humidity (%)	59.2	56.2	55.5	53.8	59.7	67.6	77.2	77.2	75.0	69.6	65.4	61.9	64.9
Mean monthly sunshine hours	185.2	187.4	211.5	222.5	247.0	205.6	147.7	163.0	169.8	197.5	167.7	175.0	2,279.9
Percentage possible sunshine	62.4	62.9	59.4	61.0	58.5	51.3	38.1	44.9	50.7	61.7	58.6	61.4	55.3
Source: Korea Meteorological Administration (snow and percent sunshine 1981–2010)

== Gallery ==
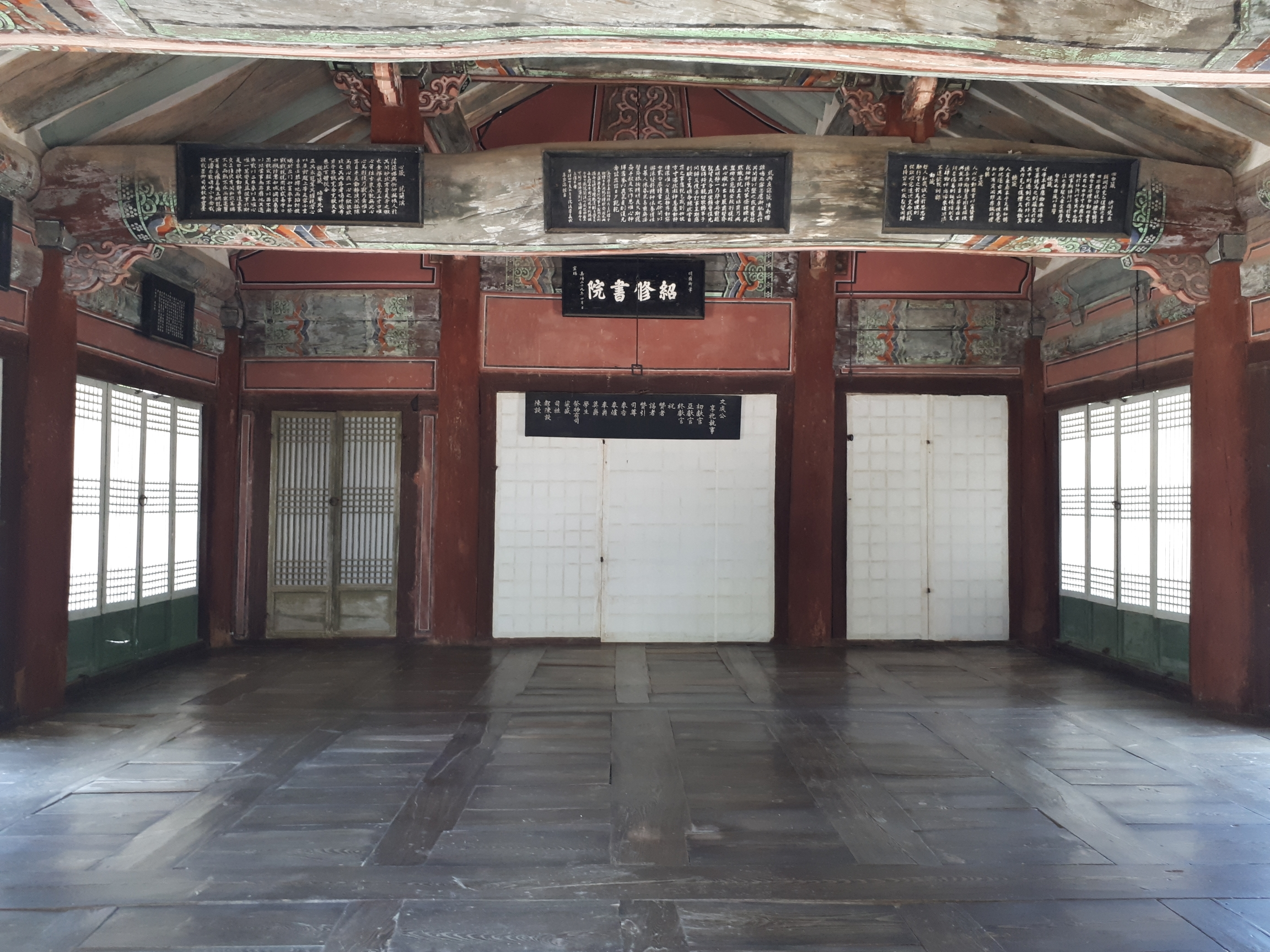
Inside of Sosu Seowon

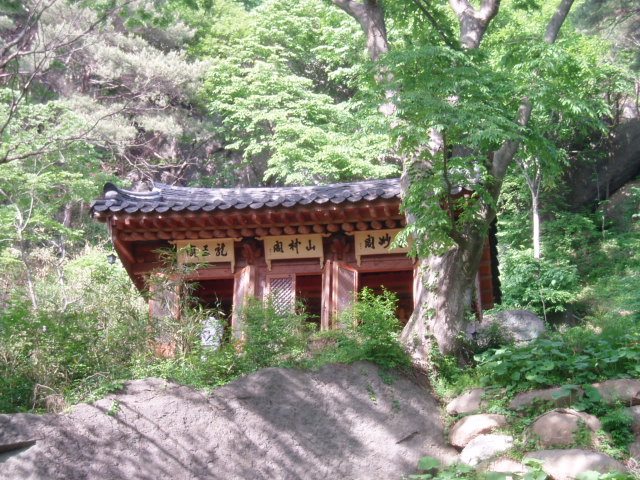
Buseoksa

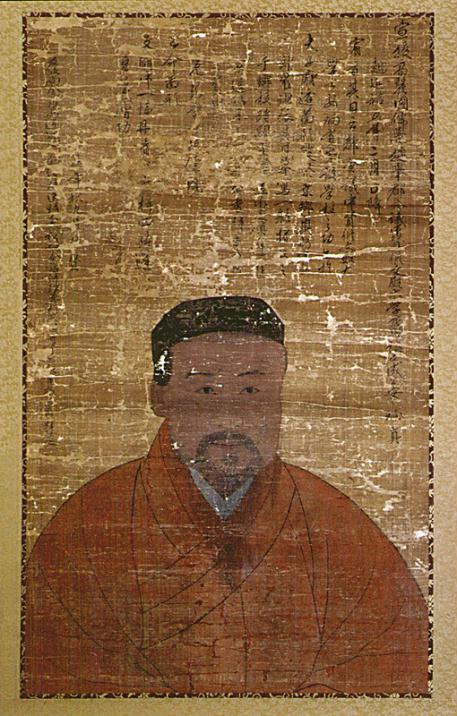
Portrait of the Confucian scholar, An Hyang, stored at Sosu Seowon

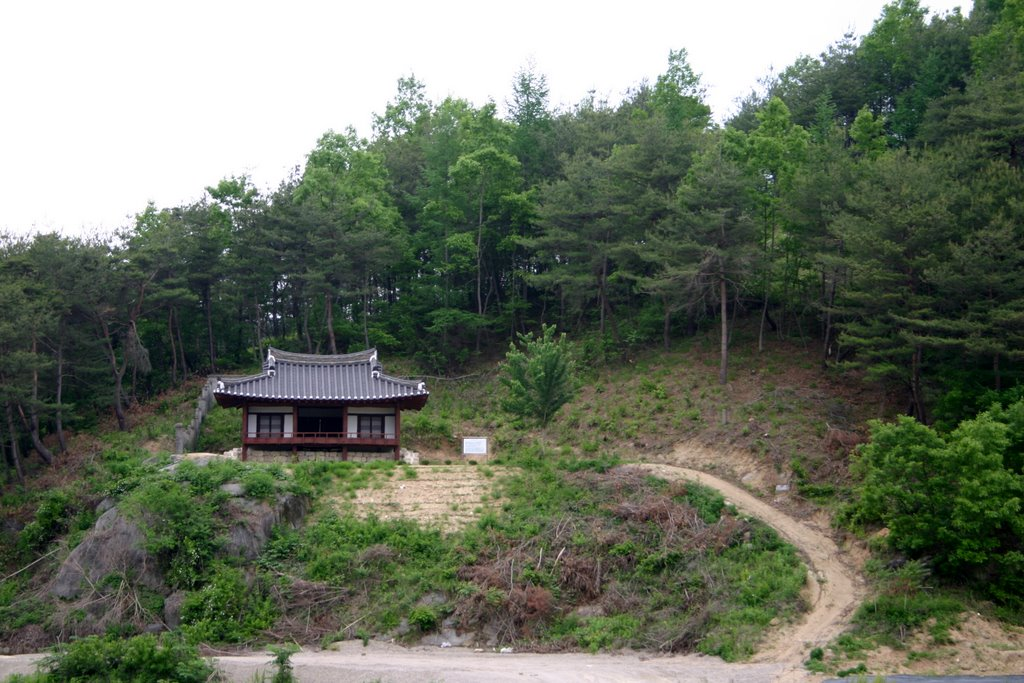
A pavilion in Tansan-ri, Yeongju

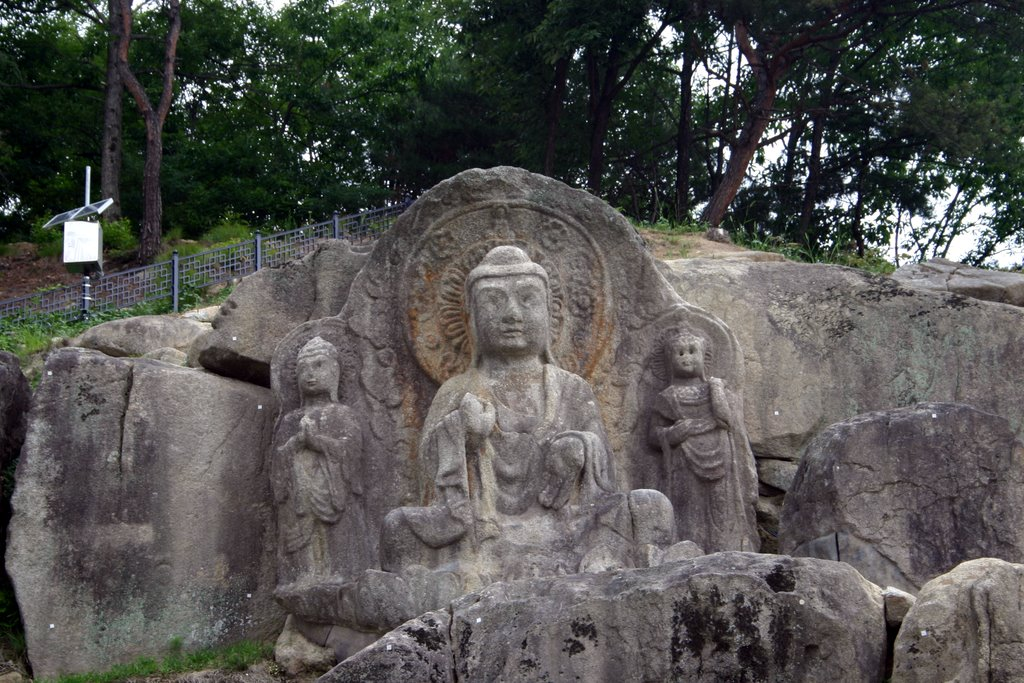
Rock carved Buddha statues in Yeongju

== Twin towns – sister cities ==
Yeongju is twinned with:

- Bozhou, China
- Fujinomiya, Japan
- Jining, China
- Nantou, Taiwan
- Shaoguan, China

== See also ==
- List of cities in South Korea
- Geography of South Korea
- People Power Party (South Korea)
